= Kafr Misr =

Kafr Misr: כַּפְר מִצְר; كفر مصر
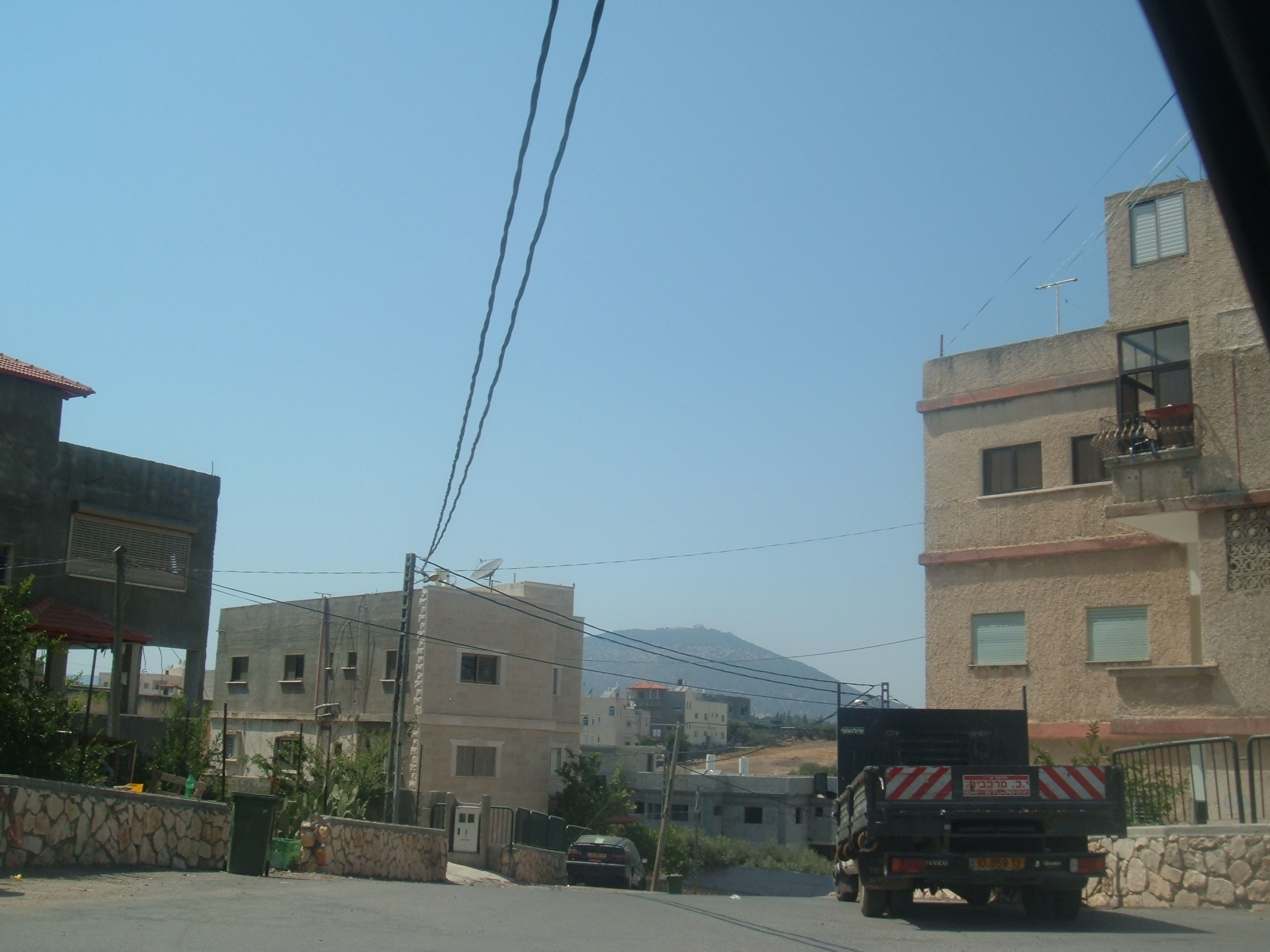

- Location within Northeast Israel Location within Israel
- Coordinates: 32°38′44″N 35°25′21″E
- Grid position: 189/227 PAL
- Country: Israel
- District: Northern
- Subdistrict: Jezreel
- Council: Bustan al-Marj

Area
  - Total: 1,000 dunams (1.0 km^{2}; 0.39 sq mi)

Population (2024)
  - Total: 2,815
  - Density: 2,800/km^{2} (7,300/sq mi)

Kafr Misr (Arabic: كفر مصر, Hebrew: כַּפְר מִצְר, lit. 'Egypt[ian] village') is an Arab village in northeastern Israel. Located near Afula to the south of the Sea of Galilee, it falls under the jurisdiction of Bustan al-Marj Regional Council. In 2024 it had a population of 2,815.

The site of Kafr Misr has been inhabited from at least the late Roman period, with archeological excavations indicating the existence of Jewish, Christian and Muslim communities, at various periods. The village's jurisdiction in 1924 was about 3,300 dunams, but today it is about 1,000 dunams.

== Location ==
The village of Kafr Misr is situated about 3 kilometers (1.9 mi) southeast of Mount Tabor on a ridge that overlooks the valley of Wadi Bireh, also known as Nahal Tabor, through which runs the tributary of Nahal Shumar.

== Name ==
Karmon writes in 1960, referring to Conder and Kitchener's Memoirs, that the name "Mebhel" registered by Jacotin in 1799 was replaced by "Kefr Misr" ('Egypt[ian] village') after the site being settled by Egyptians during the decade under the rule of Ibrahim Pasha of Egypt (1831–1841).

The Arab village may have been founded by Egyptian immigrants. Its name as recorded by the Palestine Exploration Fund in 1878 is Kefr Misr, whereas Edward Robinson and Eli Smith transliterate it as Kefr Musr in 1841. Zimmerman's map from 1861 records its name as Kefr Masr. The transliteration of its name into English used in this article was used during the period of the British Mandate in Palestine.

The authors of the Survey of Western Palestine publications from the 1880s interpreted the name as "the village of the town (or of Egypt)".

The Bustan el-Marj Regional Council website transcribes the village's name as Kufur Masser and translates kufur as "village" and masser as "Egypt", writing that the name originated with the ancient Egyptians who invaded the area in 605 BC under the rule of the Pharaoh Necho II. The Crusaders called the village Kaphar Mazre. In a map dating from 1799, its name is recorded as Mebhel which means beauty.

== History ==
Ancient sites in the village show the centrality of its role at various times in history. According to the Bustan el-Marj Regional Council, the current inhabitants of Kafr Misr include the descendants of those who have lived there for hundreds, even thousands of years, while others descended from those who came to the village from Egypt at the beginning of the 19th century, when Muhammad Ali temporarily controlled the area.

=== Roman and Byzantine empires ===
During a salvage excavation in September 2006, pottery fragments dating to the Late Roman or Byzantine period were discovered in a layer of plaster for what was interpreted to have served as a small pool designed to collect overflow waters from a nearby spring. A synagogue thought to have been constructed around the same time, in the 3rd century, was excavated between 1948 and 1987, and provides evidence for the existence of a Jewish community inhabiting Kafr Misr then. On the synagogue floor, a Hebrew mosaic inscription was found around the bema, featuring the names Abraham and Isaac. Renovated in the 4th century, following damage sustained from an earthquake, a Torah niche was added, which was later replaced by an apse, suggesting the edifice was converted into a church.

A trial excavation in 2002, carried out some 100 meters (330 ft) to the east of the synagogue structure, revealed a number of ancient walls, constructed of small and medium size rocks and plaster, that were founded on the basalt bedrock. Artifacts collected during this excavation included the rim of bowl from the late Byzantine period (circa 7th century), a jug handle and the neck of a bottle from the Early Islamic period (8th–9th centuries), and a bronze platter dated to the 11th century. The platter, though dated to the Islamic period, was made in the Byzantine style.

=== Caliphates ===
In 2004, another excavation carried out prior to construction in an area described as, "the ancient nucleus of the village," which lies some 70 meters (230 ft) from the village mosque, uncovered the remains of a wall built of basalt and limestone at the level of the basalt bedrock. In the soil overtop, a number of pottery fragments dating to the Early Islamic era were recovered. Other sites, such as a theatre and foundations of public places, show further evidence of Christian habitation, while still others show additional evidence of Muslim habitation, particularly during the Mamluk period in the 13th–14th centuries.

=== Ottoman Empire ===
==== 16th century ====
In 1517, the village was incorporated into the Ottoman Empire with the rest of Palestine, and in 1596 it appeared in the Ottoman tax registers under the name of Misrasafa, being in the nahiya ("Subdistrict") of Tabariyya, part of Safad Sanjak, with a population of 10 households, all Muslim. The villagers paid taxes on wheat, barley, occasional revenues, goats and beehives; a total of 1,970 akçe.

==== 18th century ====
In 1799, Kafr Misr was marked Mebhel on Jacotin's map surveyed during Napoleon's invasion.

==== 19th century ====
Kafr Misr fell under the rule of Muhammad Ali, the Egyptian general, between 1831 and 1840, which resulted in Egyptians coming to settle in the village at that time. The dresses worn by Egyptian women differed from the Palestinian costumes worn by the natives of Palestine, and were principally distinguished by the donning of a long Egyptian-style veil that generally had a piece of brass or metal connecting it to the headdress. Such differences could still be seen by travellers visiting the village in 1901.

In 1838, Kefr Musr was defined as located in the province of Jenin.

In The Lands of the Bible Visited and Described (1847), John Wilson identifies Kefr Muṣr as the site of ancient Meroz given its proximity to Nein (ancient Nain) and Endor (Indur). Meroz is a site mentioned in the Song of Deborah and Barak as having been cursed by the angel of God for failing to come to the aid of the Israelites.

In 1870–1871 an Ottoman census listed the village in the nahiya (sub-district) of Shafa al-Shamali. In 1875 Victor Guérin passed by Kafr Misr, and remarked that it looked like an ancient site. In 1882 the PEF's Survey of Western Palestine (SWP) described it as "a small mud village, with a spring on the north, standing in plough-land, and inhabited by Egyptians, whence its name."

=== British Mandate ===
In the 1922 census of Palestine conducted by the British Mandate authorities, Kufr Mesr had a total population of 253; all Muslims, decreasing slightly in the 1931 census to a population of 236, still all Muslim, in a total of 60 houses.

In the 1945 statistics the population of Kafr Misr was 330 Muslims, with 13,230 dunams of land, according to an official land and population survey. Of this, 15 dunams were plantations and irrigable land, 3,126 used for cereals, while 16 dunams were built-up land.

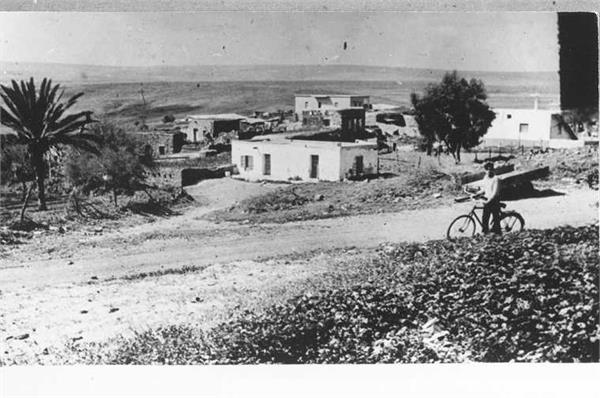
Kfar Misr 1938

Prior to the outbreak of the 1948 Arab–Israeli war, Israel Galili wrote to Yosef Weitz recommending that new settlements be established at the site of a number of Arab villages, including Kafr Misr, 'as soon as possible'. Norman Finkelstein, quoting Benny Morris, notes this recommendation was made even though most of the sites had not yet been depopulated.

=== Israel ===
During the 1948 Arab–Israeli war, on May 20, the Arab Higher Committee (AHC) ordered the evacuation of Kafr Misr and other villages in the vicinity of Mount Gilboa (al-Dahi, Nein, al-Tira, Taiyiba, and Na'ura). According to Benny Morris, the AHC, "apparently feared that they intended to throw in their lot with the Yishuv."

Israeli forces of the Golani Brigade entered Kafr Misr in June 1948, surprising the men of the village, who were asked by the commander to turn over their weapons in half an hour or they would be forced to leave. According to the commander, eight rifles were handed over with a promise to deliver more the next day and the men requested, "permission to continue the harvest and to [be able to] move freely to Nazareth. I said they would receive an answer after they delivered the arms." Morris notes that elsewhere, other Golani troops behaved differently. The settlement of Ein Dor was established just adjacent to Kafr Misr that same month.

== Bibliography ==
- Alexandre, Yardenna (2008-01-13). "Kafr Misr Final Report". Hadashot Arkheologiyot – Excavations and Surveys in Israel (120).
- Baldensperger, Philip J. (1901). "Part IV The Egyptian Woman". Quarterly Statement – Palestine Exploration Fund. 33: 258–262.
- Barron, J. B., ed. (1923). Palestine: Report and General Abstracts of the Census of 1922. Government of Palestine.
- Conder, C.R.; Kitchener, H.H. (1882). The Survey of Western Palestine: Memoirs of the Topography, Orography, Hydrography, and Archaeology. Vol. 2. London: Committee of the Palestine Exploration Fund.
- Department of Statistics (1945). Village Statistics, April, 1945. Government of Palestine.
- Finkelstein, N. (2003). Image and reality of the Israel-Palestine conflict (2nd, revised ed.). Verso. ISBN 1-85984-442-1.
- Grootkerk, Salomon E. (2000). Ancient sites in Galilee: a toponymic gazetteer (Illustrated ed.). BRILL. ISBN 90-04-11535-8.
- Guérin, V. (1880). Description Géographique Historique et Archéologique de la Palestine (in French). Vol. 3: Galilee, pt. 1. Paris: L'Imprimerie Nationale.
- Hadawi, S. (1970). Village Statistics of 1945: A Classification of Land and Area ownership in Palestine. Palestine Liberation Organization Research Center.
- Hillman, Avner (2014-05-20). "Kafr Misr". Hadashot Arkheologiyot – Excavations and Surveys in Israel (126).
- Hütteroth, W.-D.; Abdulfattah, K. (1977). Historical Geography of Palestine, Transjordan and Southern Syria in the Late 16th Century. Erlanger Geographische Arbeiten, Sonderband 5. Erlangen, Germany: Vorstand der Fränkischen Geographischen Gesellschaft. ISBN 3-920405-41-2.
- Karmon, Y. (1960). "An Analysis of Jacotin's Map of Palestine" (PDF). Israel Exploration Journal. 10 (3, 4): 155–173, 244–253. Archived from the original (PDF) on 2019-12-22.
- Kleiner, Anya (2017-12-03). "Kafr Misr Final Report". Hadashot Arkheologiyot – Excavations and Surveys in Israel (129).
- Mills, E., ed. (1932). Census of Palestine 1931. Population of Villages, Towns and Administrative Areas. Jerusalem: Government of Palestine.
- Mokary, Abdalla (2008-10-05). "Kafr Misr Final Report". Hadashot Arkheologiyot – Excavations and Surveys in Israel (120).
- Mokary, Abdalla (2012-12-24). "Kafr Misr Final Report". Hadashot Arkheologiyot – Excavations and Surveys in Israel (124).
- Mokary, Abdalla (2013-12-31). "Kafr Misr Final Report". Hadashot Arkheologiyot – Excavations and Surveys in Israel (125).
- Morris, B. (2004). The Birth of the Palestinian Refugee Problem Revisited. Cambridge University Press. ISBN 978-0-521-00967-6.
- Palmer, E.H. (1881). The Survey of Western Palestine: Arabic and English Name Lists Collected During the Survey by Lieutenants Conder and Kitchener, R. E. Transliterated and Explained by E.H. Palmer. Committee of the Palestine Exploration Fund.
- Robinson, E.; Smith, E. (1841). Biblical Researches in Palestine, Mount Sinai and Arabia Petraea: A Journal of Travels in the year 1838. Vol. 3. Boston: Crocker & Brewster.
- Room, A. (2005). Placenames Of The World: Origins and Meanings of the Names for 6,600 Countries, Cities, Territories, Natural Features and Historic Sites (2nd ed.). McFarland & Company. p. 185. ISBN 978-0-7864-2248-7.
- Stemberger, Günter (2000). Jews and Christians in the Holy Land: Palestine in the fourth century (Illustrated ed.). Continuum International Publishing Group. ISBN 0-567-08699-2.
- Stewardson, Henry C.; Palestine Exploration Fund (1838). The survey of western Palestine: A general index to 1. The memoirs, vols. I.-III.; 2. The special papers; 3. The Jerusalem volume; 4. The flora and fauna of Palestine; 5. The geological survey; and to The Arabic and English name lists. Printed for the Committee of the Palestine Exploration Fund by Harrison & sons.
- Syon, Danny (2006-05-22). "Kafr Misr Final Report". Hadashot Arkheologiyot – Excavations and Surveys in Israel (118).
- Wilson, John (1847). The Lands of the Bible Visited and Described. Vol. 2. White.
