= Endor (village) =

Biblical place

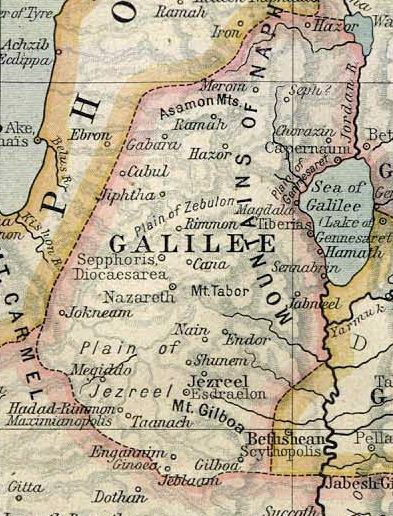
A map showing Endor in ancient Galilee. The actual location of Endor is disputed.

Endor (Biblical Hebrew: עֵין־דֹּר/עֵין דּוֹר, romanized: ʿĒn-Dor or עֵין־דֹּאר) was listed in the Book of Joshua (Joshua 17:11) as one of the Canaanite cities the Israelites failed to dispossess, neither the city nor its dependencies. It was located between the Hill of Moreh and Mount Tabor in the Jezreel Valley. It is mentioned twice more in the Hebrew Bible, in 1 Samuel and in Psalm 83.

== Etymology ==
The original meaning of "Endor" is unknown and its spelling in Hebrew varies. It may be connected with the words ʿen "spring" and dor "generation".

== In the Bible ==
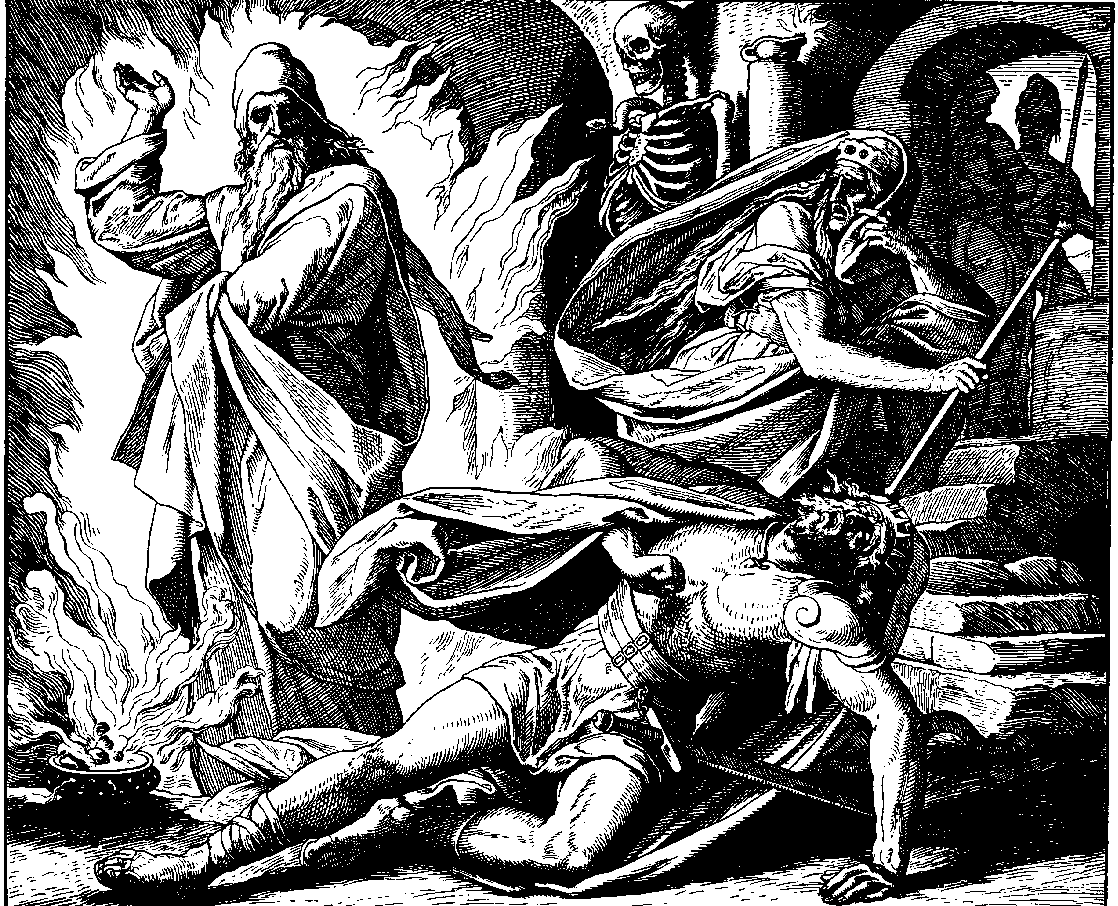
Saul consults the witch of Endor, 1860 woodcut by Julius Schnorr von Karolsfeld

Endor was first mentioned in Joshua 17:11, when Endor fell within the allotments of the Tribe of Manasseh.

In 1 Samuel 28:4–25, Saul consulted the Witch of Endor (1 Samuel 28:7), who lived in the village, on the evening before the Battle of Gilboa, in which he perished.

According to Psalms 83:9–10, it was the scene of the rout of Jabin and Sisera after being defeated by Barak and Deborah in Judges 4–5.

== Location ==
The location of Endor is widely debated, and many places have been suggested. From the biblical accounts, an Endor located on the south edge of the Jezreel Valley seems to fit best. The tribal allotments of Manasseh, Saul's journey to Endor and the defeat of Sisera's army all fit well with a location on this side of the valley, somewhere between Khirbet Bel'ameh and Ti'inik. However, there are difficulties with this location. From the origin of the name, a spring must also be located somewhere nearby, and archaeological evidence from the time of Joshua, Judges, and Saul is required.

Many suggested sites are located on the north side of the Jezreel Valley, near or on the Hill of Moreh. The main reasons for this placement are due to tradition and name preservation. The central difficulty for Endor in a northern location is that it does not fit the biblical accounts well. The city lists in Joshua 17:11, and Judges 1:27 would mention Endor out of logical order. However, a supporting factor for a northern site is that Saul had to be disguised as he traveled to the witch at Endor. That is usually attributed to Endor being behind enemy lines since the Philistines were camped at Shunem, just southwest of the most accepted Endor site. Those who hold to a southern site location explain the disguise as necessary not to transverse any enemy lines, but to hide Saul's identity from the medium. Both explanations are possible. The following sites have been suggested:

- Khirbet Jadurah: This site is located on the south edge of the Jezreel Valley, but with no spring, the site has been deemed incorrect.
- Tell Qedesh / Tell abu Qudeis; This tell is a much better site than Khirbet Jadurah and located on the south edge of the Jezreel Valley. It has two springs nearby, remains from the right periods, and a walled city area. Proponents for a southern Endor usually hold to this as the correct site for ancient Endor.
- Tell el-Ajjul / el-Ajyul / Agol (32°37′53.91″N 35°22′19.3″E): This tell is located on the north side of the Jezreel Valley 3 km (2 mi) east of Nain, on the right of the road to Tamra. The small hill, on the east side of the Hill of Moreh, is 211 meters high. Archaeologists have uncovered tombs and a spring inside a cave. The spring was named Fountain of Dor as it was believed to be the site of Endor. This site is distinct from Tell el-Ajjul in the Gaza Strip and the ancient village of Ajjul north of Jerusalem.
- Indur, Endur, En-dor (32°38′14.2″N 35°22′35.45″E): The Palestinian town of Indur, depopulated during the 1947–1949 Palestine war, preserved the name of the ancient site. Excavations were carried out on Indur, but with no remains found at the site, it was largely ruled out as being ancient Endor.
- Khirbet Safsafeh / Es-Safsafa (32°38′26.69″N 35°22′36.91″E): Many believe Khirbet Safsafeh to be the site of ancient En-dor, as reflected as being the site most normally marked on maps. This site is located 6.7 km (4 mi) northeast of modern Sulam, 4 mi (6 km) south of Mount Tabor. Two wadis drain from this location, one to the northeast and the other to the northwest. During Roman Palestine, the site had a large population. Arabs later inhabited it until it was depopulated during the 1947–1949 Palestine war. After the war, Israelis built a kibbutz there named Ein Dor. Tradition seems to be the best support for Khirbet Safsafeh. Since the 4th century, Endor has been recognized by early Christian pilgrims and by the Crusaders as Biblical Endor. During the Crusader era, it was mentioned by Brocardus, a 14th-century German priest. When Edward Robinson came upon the site, he described it as an ordinary village. C. Conder and H. Kitchener also recognized the site and described it as a small village. Name preservation also supports Khirbet Safsafeh as being ancient Endor, for although the site does not preserve the ancient name, its nearby neighbor to the northeast, Indur, did. The modern village could have easily moved from the ancient site, taking the name with it.

== See also ==
- Ein Dor (kibbutz)
- Witch of Endor
- Endor (Star Wars)

== Bibliography ==
- Freedman, David Noel; Myers, Allen C.; Beck, Astrid B. (2000), David Noel Freedman; Allen C. Myers; Astrid B. Beck (eds.), Eerdmans dictionary of the Bible (Illustrated ed.), Wm. B. Eerdmans Publishing, ISBN 978-0-8028-2400-4, ISBN 0-8028-2400-5
- Khalidi, Walid (1992), All That Remains: The Palestinian Villages Occupied and Depopulated by Israel in 1948, Washington D.C.: Institute for Palestine Studies, ISBN 0-88728-224-5
- Schmidt, Brian B. (1994), Israel's beneficent dead: ancestor cult and necromancy in ancient Israelite religion and tradition, Mohr Siebeck, ISBN 978-3-16-146221-4, ISBN 3-16-146221-1
- Walton, John H.; Matthews, Victor Harold; Chavalas, Mark W. (2000), The IVP Bible Background Commentary: Old Testament (Illustrated ed.), InterVarsity Press, ISBN 978-0-8308-1419-0, ISBN 0-8308-1419-1
