= Meroz =

Biblical city

Meroz (Hebrew: מֵרוֹז Mêrōz; Greek: Μερώζ) is a city mentioned in the Book of Judges.

Thought to be a city within the plains of Galilee north of Mount Tabor in Israel which was cursed by the angel of God in the song of Deborah and Barak; whose inhabitants did not come to help the Israelites in battle against Sisera's army. Meroz may possibly be identified with el-Murussus, a village about 5 miles Northwest of Beisan, on the slopes to the North of the Vale of Jezreel. The village of Kafr Misr has also been identified as a possible site, due its proximity to other nearby ancient sites such as Nein (Nain) and Indur (Endor).

Curse ye Meroz, said the angel of YHWH, curse ye bitterly the inhabitants thereof; because they came not to the help of YHWH, to the help of YHWH against the mighty.

-Judges 5:23

== In medieval Jewish interpretation ==
According to the Talmud (Moed Katan 16a), Meroz was either a great man (Aramaic: גברא רבה) or a star (כוכבא), the latter based on the preceding verse, Judges 5:23, "the stars in their course fought against Sisera" (v.20). Rashi ad loc. comments that the "star" is "Sisera's zodiac". However, most medieval Rabbinic commentators (D. Qimhi, Gersonides, Abarbanel, Sforno, Qara, di Trani,) agree that Meroz is a place, as does Aaron b. Joseph Rofe.

== In Protestant thought ==
In Protestant thought, the "sin of Meroz" refers to apathy or a failure to testify. In John Buchan's Witch Wood, set at the time of the Covenanters, the narrator says of the protagonist, David Semphill, that "he felt that it was his duty to testify, or otherwise he would be guilty of the sin of Meroz, the sin of apathy when his faith was challenged.

At the time of the American Revolution, Patriot writers argued that the Loyalists were guilty of the sin of Meroz, in that they neglected to defend their country, religion and liberty.

== In Modern Hebrew literature ==
From Hayim Nahman Bialik's poem Birkat 'am (People's blessing, Adar II 5654/March 1894):

?וְלָמָּה, הַמְפַגְּרִים, פַּעֲמֵיכֶם כֹּה בוֹשְׁשׁוּ
?הַעֶבֶד יִשְׂרָאֵל, הַאִם בְּנֵי מֵרוֹז

Why did your steps hesitate so much, you stragglers?
Are Jews slaves, are they Meroz' sons?

== Bibliography ==
- Wilson, John (1847). The Lands of the Bible Visited and Described, Volume 2. White.
- Ewing, W. "Meroz," International Standard Bible Encyclopaedia (1913).
