= Uzi Shalev =

Israeli bassoonist (born 1961)

- עוזי שלו
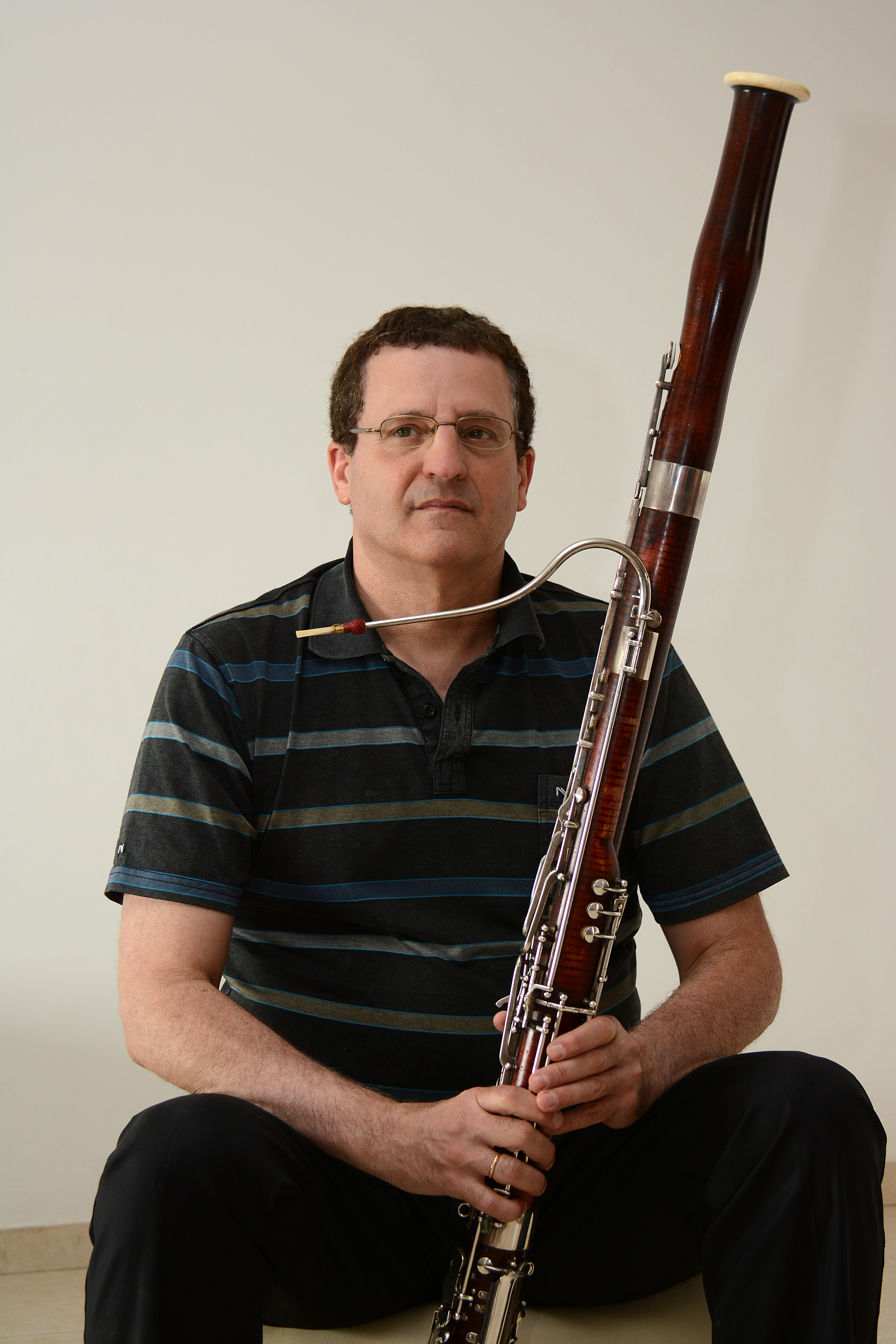
- Shalev in 2014
- Born: 3 July 1961 (age 65); Ein Dor, Lower Galilee, Israel
- Education: Juilliard School
- Occupation: Bassoonist
- Years active: 1987–present
- Employer: Israel Philharmonic Orchestra
- Style: Classical

Uzi Shalev (Hebrew: עוזי שלו; born 3 July 1961) is an Israeli bassoonist. Since 1987, he has been the assistant principal bassoonist for the Israel Philharmonic Orchestra (IPO).

== Early life ==
Shalev was born on 3 July 1961 in a kibbutz in Ein Dor, Israel, the son of Rafi and Ahuva Shalev.

He studied the bassoon with Sara Tzur, Zeev Dorman, Walter Meroz and Mordechai Rechtman. Upon completion of his regular military service in the Israel Defense Forces (IDF) as an officer, he continued his studies at the Juilliard School in New York.

== Career ==
Since 1987, Shalev has been the assistant principal bassoonist of the Israel Philharmonic Orchestra (IPO).

As first chair bassoonist with the IPO, Shalev has toured many major cities in North America, South America, Europe, Asia and Australia, under the baton of maestros Zubin Mehta, Lorin Maazel, Kurt Mazur, Gustavo Dudamel and Lahav Shani, and other conductors.

Shalev is an active musician who appears regularly with various chamber ensembles and performs as soloist with orchestras, including the IPO.

=== Solo performances with the Israel Philharmonic Orchestra ===
Shalev's solo performances with the IPO have included George Philip Telemann's Double Concerto for Flute and Bassoon (1990), Joseph Haydn's Sinfonia Concertante (1998) and Aharon Harlap's Bassoon Concerto (2005), which was composed for and dedicated to Shalev. For this world premiere of Harlap's Concerto, Shalev won the Ödön Pártos Prize from Israel's Minister of Culture, Science and Sports for "best performance of an Israeli composition".

== Premieres ==
Shalev has commissioned and premiered numerous compositions by distinguished Israeli composers, among them, Yehezkel Braun, Theodore Holdhaim, Ben-Zion Orgad, Tzvi Avni, Aharon Harlap, Arie Shapira, Ronn Yedidia, Tamar Muskal, Amit Poznansky, Eyal Bat, Ayala Asherov, Boris Pigovat, Moshe Zorman, and others. The bassoonist and arranger Mordechai Rechtman has also dedicated a few of his arrangements to Shalev.

== Discography ==
Shalev has recorded for radio, television and compact discs. His compact discs include the following:

Release year	Title	Composer	Label	Personnel / Notes
1993	Flute Sonatas	Georg Philipp Telemann	Meridian CDE 84231	With flautist Yossi Arnheim; won the English Music Retailers Prize for Best Chamber CD of 1993
1998	Bassoon Concerto in E-Flat Major	Johann Christian Bach	Meridian CDE 84359	With the Capella Istropolitana of Bratislava and Yossi Arnheim
2012	"The Phoenix"	Yehezkel Braun	Romeo 7291/2	Together with flautist Lior Eitan and pianist Rotem Luz
2015	Four flute quartets	Wolfgang Amadeus Mozart	Meridian CDE 84637	July 2015; arranged for bassoon and string trio by Mordechai Rechtman; released in the UK
