= Sulam =

Arab village in northern Israel

Sulam: סוּלַם (Hebrew); سولم (Arabic)
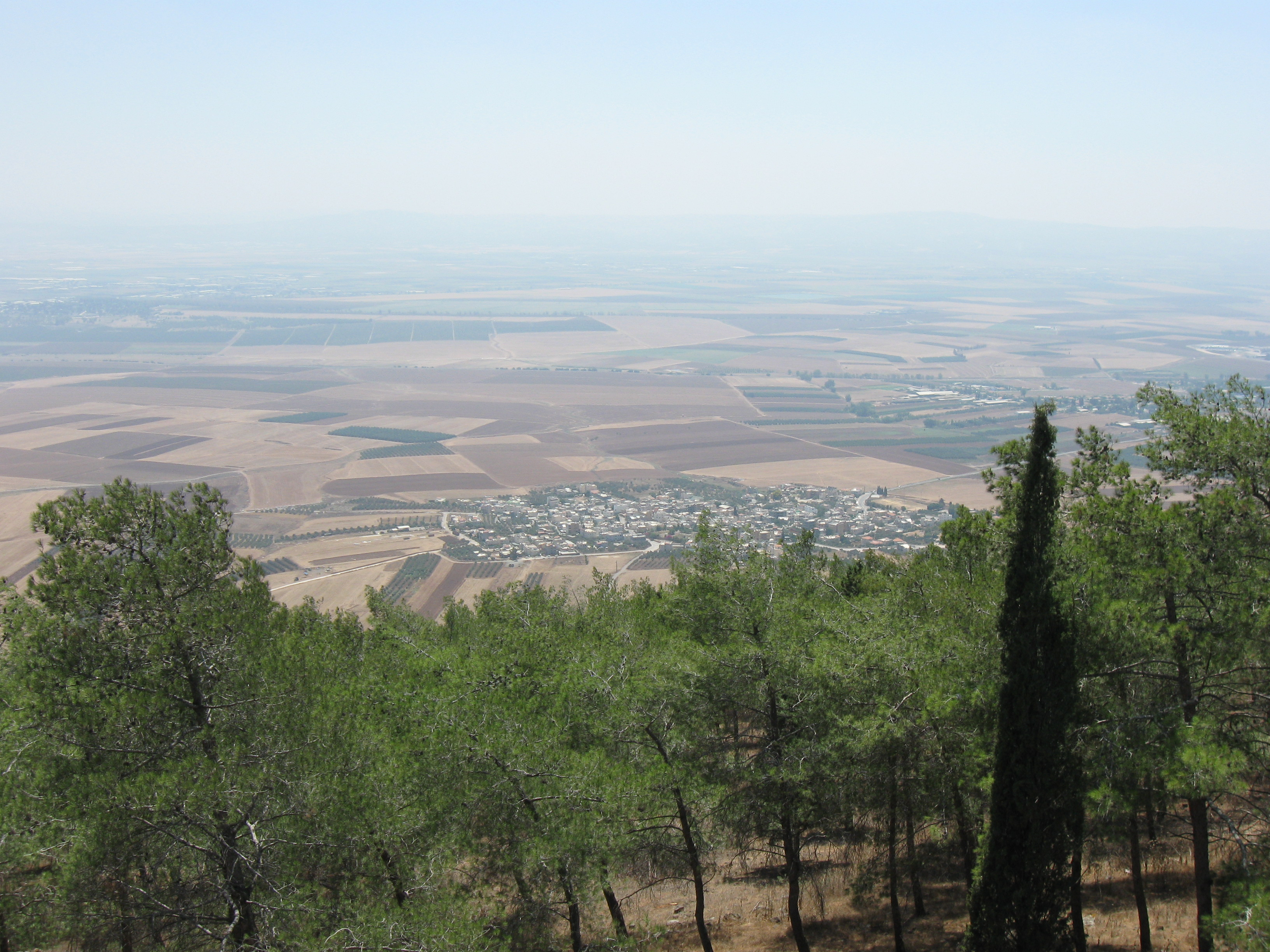
- Sulam, seen from Nabi Dahi

- Location within Jezreel Valley region of Israel Location within Israel
- Coordinates: 32°36′20″N 35°20′04″E
- Grid position: 181/223 PAL
- Country: Israel
- District: Northern
- Subdistrict: Jezreel
- Council: Bustan al-Marj
- Population (2024): 2,933

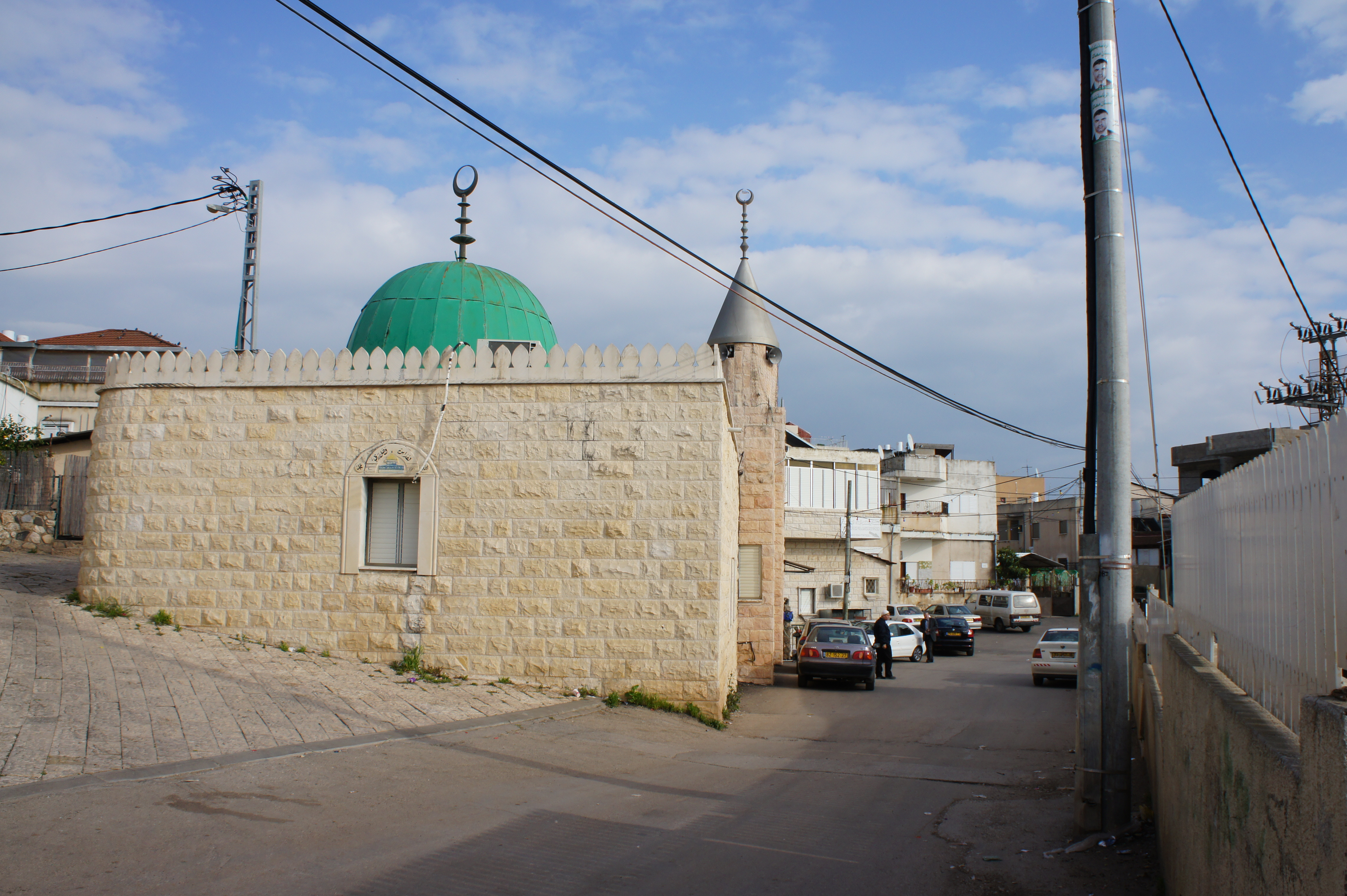
Sulam street with mosque (2012)

Sulam (Arabic: سولم; Hebrew: סוּלַם) is an Arab village in north-eastern Israel. Known in ancient times as Shunama and Shunem, it is first mentioned in the Amarna Letters in the 14th century BCE. Archaeological excavations in the village attest to habitation extending from the Bronze Age through to modern times. Located near Afula, it falls under the jurisdiction of Bustan al-Marj Regional Council. In 2024 it had a population of 2,933.

== In the Hebrew Bible ==
Sulam has been identified with the biblical village of Shunem, which is said to be of the tribe of Issachar, the place where the Philistines camped before Saul's last battle, and the native town of Abishag, King David's concubine in 1 Kings 1:3, and of the noble woman whose son was revived by the prophet Elisha in 2 Kings 4:8.

== History ==
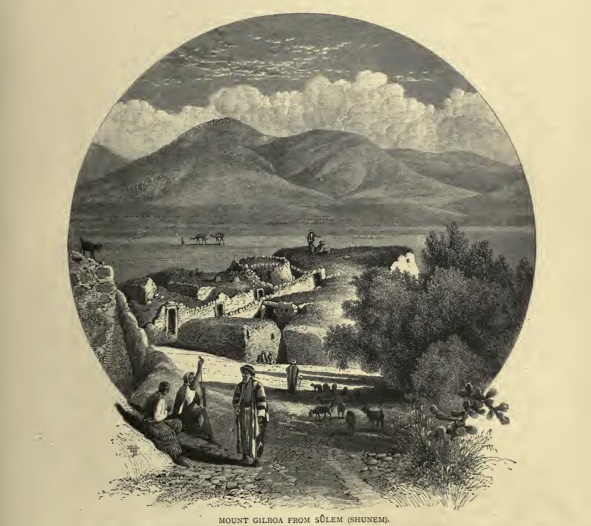
The village of Sulam, from "Picturesque Palestine", 1880s.

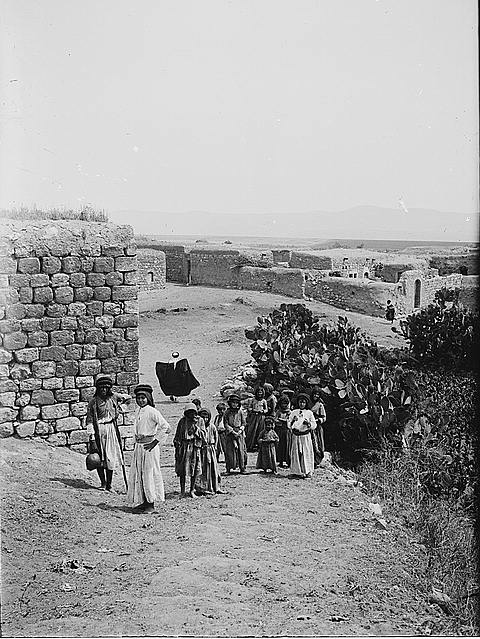
The village of Sulam, pre-1914

The village is situated on and around an archaeological tell (mound) and developed around the spring. The core of the village has been repeatedly destroyed and rebuilt.

Various archaeological digs undertaken in Sulam have brought to light pottery and other remains from the Early and Middle Bronze Age, the Iron Age, and most of the following periods: Hellenistic (feebly represented), Roman, Byzantine, Early Muslim (findings from the 7th–10th centuries), Crusader, Mamluk, and Ottoman (17th–19th c. findings). A hiatus in settlement between the 13th and 19th centuries was observed in one specific area of the tell north of the spring. Collapsed masonry from the end of the Crusader and beginning of the Mamluk period in the 13th century was documented on the tell.

In December 2006, a trial excavation was undertaken on the southern slope of the tell, near the spring in the centre of the village, exposing four layers dated to the Early Islamic, Crusader, Mamluk and Ottoman periods. It uncovered potsherds from the Roman (3rd century), Byzantine, and Early Muslim periods, as well as various finds from the Crusader (12th century), Mamluk (13th–15th centuries), and Ottoman (17th–19th centuries) periods.

Another excavation, undertaken on the main street of the village and north of the spring at the end of 2007, uncovered building remains from the Early Islamic period (8th–10th centuries) and the late Ottoman period (19th century), as well as a burnt layer from the end of the Crusader and beginning of the Mamluk periods (12th–13th centuries). It also revealed potsherds from the Iron Age, Hellenistic, Byzantine and Roman periods.

Remains discovered in the village include hiding complexes, tombs, and a church.

=== Metal ages ===
A 2004 salvage excavation exposed Early Bronze Age remains including part of a stone building and potsherds, covered by Roman-period strata. Potsherds from the Middle Bronze Age were unearthed at a 2007 trial excavation.

In the Amarna letters, 14th century BCE clay tablets written in the cuneiform script of the Akkadian language, the village is listed under its ancient name of Shunama, as one of several cities conquered by the Canaanite warlord Lab'ayu in the Dothan Valley and southern Jezreel Valley.

A 2007 excavation discovered potsherds from the Iron Age.

=== Roman and Byzantine empires ===
Mentioned by the name Sulem in 4th century CE works, such as the Onomasticon of Eusebius, and by Jerome, both authors situate it 5 Roman miles from Tabor.

A 2004 salvage excavation unearthed Roman period remains including potsherds, coins, animal bones, and marble fragments. 3rd-century potsherds were uncovered in the 2006 trial dig.

=== Caliphates and Crusaders ===
The 2006 trial excavation exposed a wall that was probably built before the Early Islamic period. In 2007 an excavation exposed pottery sherds dated to either the Byzantine or the beginning of the Early Muslim period. At another dig, two coins were dated to shortly after the Byzantine period, one of which was an Arab-Byzantine coin (c. 640–660 CE) that imitates the coins of Emperor Constans II.

A 2003 salvage excavation undertaken at the southern end of the village uncovered a tabun oven and fragments of pottery that were dated to the early Abbasid period.

The village was known to the Crusaders (12th century) under the name Suna.

A thick burnt layer indicating prolonged activity with fire was exposed next to collapsed stone masonry and was dated to the end of the Crusader and beginning of the Mamluk period. The stratum of burnt earth and ashes has been exposed during various excavations on the tell and can be associated with prolonged activity at a kiln or oven. The 2006 trial excavation also came across a grey layer from the Crusader period. A wall and living space from the Mamluk period were uncovered during salvage excavations in a private home in August 2006. The December 2006 trial dig again uncovered building remains from the Mamluk period.

=== Ottoman Empire ===
In 1517 the village was incorporated into the Ottoman Empire with the rest of Palestine. During the 16th and 17th centuries, Sulam belonged to the Turabay Emirate (1517–1683), which encompassed also the Jezreel Valley, Haifa, Jenin, Beit She'an Valley, northern Jabal Nablus, Bilad al-Ruha/Ramot Menashe, and the northern part of the Sharon plain. Sulam was listed in the tax registers of 1596 as being in the nahiya of Jinin in the liwa of Lajjun, with a population of 26 Muslim families. The villagers paid a fixed tax rate of 25% on various agricultural products, including wheat, barley, summecrops, goats and beehives in addition to"occasional revenues"; a total of 8,500 akçe.

The 2006 trial excavation unearthed building remains from the Ottoman period: from the early phase (17th–18th centuries) mainly potsherds, but from the later phase (the beginning of the 19th century) a stone-paved open area yielding, apart from potsherds, a large number of animal bones, indicating an animal-related activity. Pierre Jacotin named the village Soulin on his map from 1799. Edward Robinson and Eli Smith, who visited the village in 1838, describe it as "small and dirty" and its inhabitants as "civil and friendly." They also recount being approached by the Wely of Duhy who offered to take them to the shrine on the mountain, which he said was often visited by monks.

In 1870–1871 an Ottoman census listed the village in the nahiya (sub-district) of Shafa al-Shamali. In 1882 the PEF's Survey of Western Palestine (SWP) describes Sulam as, "a large village, standing on a slope near the foot of Jebel ed Duhy ["Mountain of Duhy"]". It further notes that part of the village was built of stone, and that to the west there were shady gardens of lemon-trees. A perennial spring in the west collected in a stone trough was said to have a good supply of clear water in September, 1872. What was described as a suburb of mud hovels ran southwards out from the village.

=== British Mandate ===
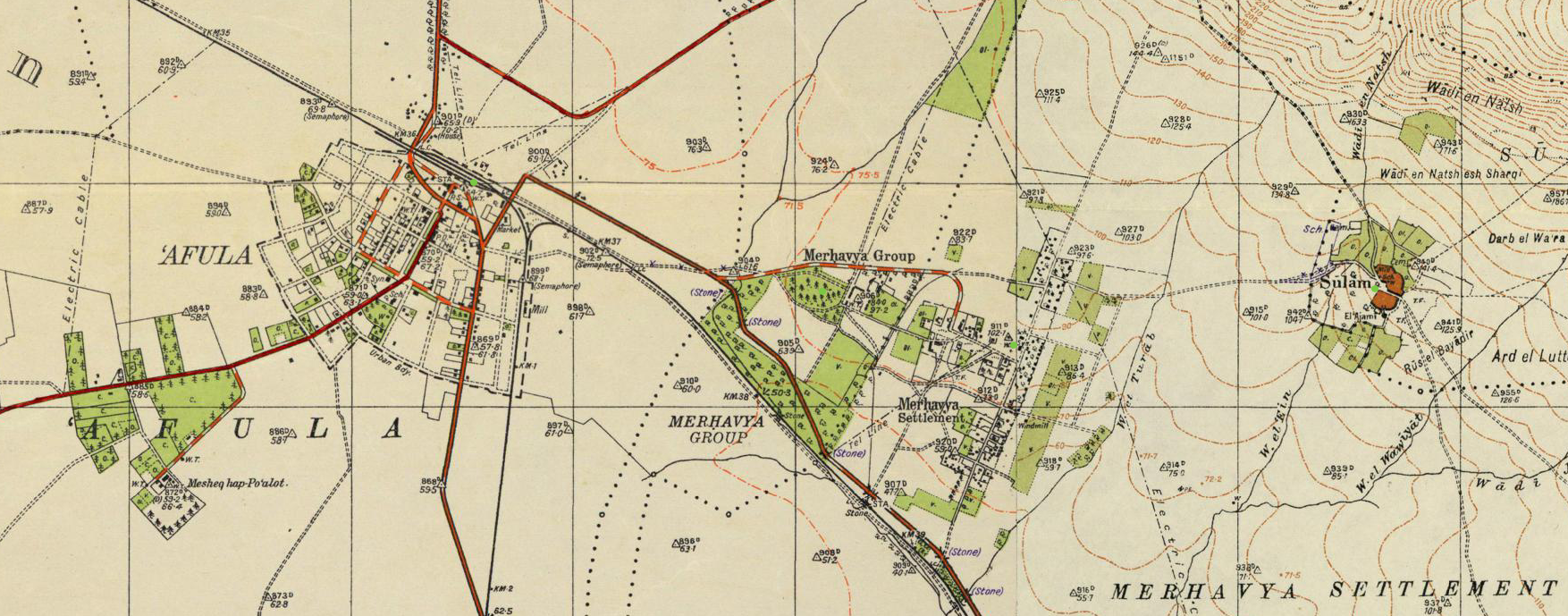
1940s Survey of Palestine map of Sulam

In the 1922 census of Palestine conducted by the British authorities, Suolam had a population of 370; 366 Muslims and 4 Christians, decreasing in the 1931 census to 328, all Muslim, in a total of 85 houses. In the 1945 statistics the population was 470, all Muslims, while the total land area was 3,605 dunams, according to an official land and population survey. Of this, 4 dunams were allocated for citrus and bananas, 291 for plantations and irrigable land, 2,041 for cereals, while 17 dunams were classified as built-up areas.

== Notable residents ==
- Maharan Radi (born 1982), footballer

== See also ==
- Arab localities in Israel
- Abdel Rahman Zuabi

== Bibliography ==
- Abu Zedan, Fadi (2019-12-29). "Sulam" (131). Hadashot Arkheologiyot – Excavations and Surveys in Israel.
- Alexandre, Yardenna (2008-03-26). "Sulam" (120). Hadashot Arkheologiyot – Excavations and Surveys in Israel.
- Barron, J.B., ed. (1923). Palestine: Report and General Abstracts of the Census of 1922. Government of Palestine.
- Cinamon, Gilad (2012-03-16). "Sulam" (122). Hadashot Arkheologiyot – Excavations and Surveys in Israel.
- Conder, C.R.; Kitchener, H.H. (1882). The Survey of Western Palestine: Memoirs of the Topography, Orography, Hydrography, and Archaeology. Vol. 2. London: Committee of the Palestine Exploration Fund.
- Covello-Paran, Karen (2006-09-10). "Sulam" (118). Hadashot Arkheologiyot – Excavations and Surveys in Israel.
- Covello-Paran, Karen (2010-02-07). "Sulam" (122). Hadashot Arkheologiyot – Excavations and Surveys in Israel.
- Covello-Paran, Karen (2011-03-28). "Sulam, Tel Shunem" (123). Hadashot Arkheologiyot – Excavations and Surveys in Israel.
- Dalali-Amos, Edna (2009-02-14). "Sulam" (121). Hadashot Arkheologiyot – Excavations and Surveys in Israel.
- Dalali-Amos, Edna (2009-12-02). "Sulam" (121). Hadashot Arkheologiyot – Excavations and Surveys in Israel.
- Dalali-Amos, Edna (2009-12-05). "Sulam" (121). Hadashot Arkheologiyot – Excavations and Surveys in Israel.
- Dalali-Amos, Edna (2011-12-04). "Sulam" (123). Hadashot Arkheologiyot – Excavations and Surveys in Israel.
- Government of Palestine, Department of Statistics (1945). Village Statistics, April, 1945.
- Goren, Yuval; I. Finkelstein; Michal Artzy, eds. (2004). Inscribed in clay: provenance study of the Amarna tablets and other ancient Near Eastern texts. Emery and Claire Yass Publications in Archaeology. ISBN 9789652660206.
- Gosker, Joppe (2014-11-17). "Sulam" (126). Hadashot Arkheologiyot – Excavations and Surveys in Israel.
- Guérin, V. (1880). Description Géographique Historique et Archéologique de la Palestine (in French). Vol. 3: Galilee, pt. 1. Paris: L'Imprimerie Nationale. p.112 - p. 114
- Hadawi, S. (1970). Village Statistics of 1945: A Classification of Land and Area ownership in Palestine. Palestine Liberation Organization Research Center.
- Hanna, Butrus (2008-01-08). "Sulam" (120). Hadashot Arkheologiyot – Excavations and Surveys in Israel.
- Hütteroth, W.-D.; Abdulfattah, K. (1977). Historical Geography of Palestine, Transjordan and Southern Syria in the Late 16th Century. Erlanger Geographische Arbeiten, Sonderband 5. Erlangen, Germany: Vorstand der Fränkischen Geographischen Gesellschaft. ISBN 3-920405-41-2.
- Karmon, Y. (1960). "An Analysis of Jacotin's Map of Palestine" (PDF). Israel Exploration Journal. 10 (3, 4): 155–173, 244–253.
- Mills, E., ed. (1932). Census of Palestine 1931. Population of Villages, Towns and Administrative Areas. Jerusalem: Government of Palestine.
- Palmer, E.H. (1881). The Survey of Western Palestine: Arabic and English Name Lists Collected During the Survey by Lieutenants Conder and Kitchener, R. E. Transliterated and Explained by E.H. Palmer. Committee of the Palestine Exploration Fund.
- Robinson, E.; Smith, E. (1841). Biblical Researches in Palestine, Mount Sinai and Arabia Petraea: A Journal of Travels in the year 1838. Vol. 3. Boston: Crocker & Brewster.
- Tsafrir, Y.; Leah Di Segni; Judith Green (1994). (TIR): Tabula Imperii Romani: Judaea, Palaestina. Jerusalem: Israel Academy of Sciences and Humanities. ISBN 965-208-107-8.
- Wilson, C.W., ed. (c. 1881). Picturesque Palestine, Sinai and Egypt. Vol. 2. New York: D. Appleton.
