= Bustan al-Marj Regional Council =

Regional council in Northern Israel

Coordinates: 32°37′10.45″N 35°20′36.1″E

Bustan al-Marj Regional Council Arabic: مجلس بستان المرج الإقليمي מועצה אזורית בוסתן אל-מרג'
- Regional council (from 2000)
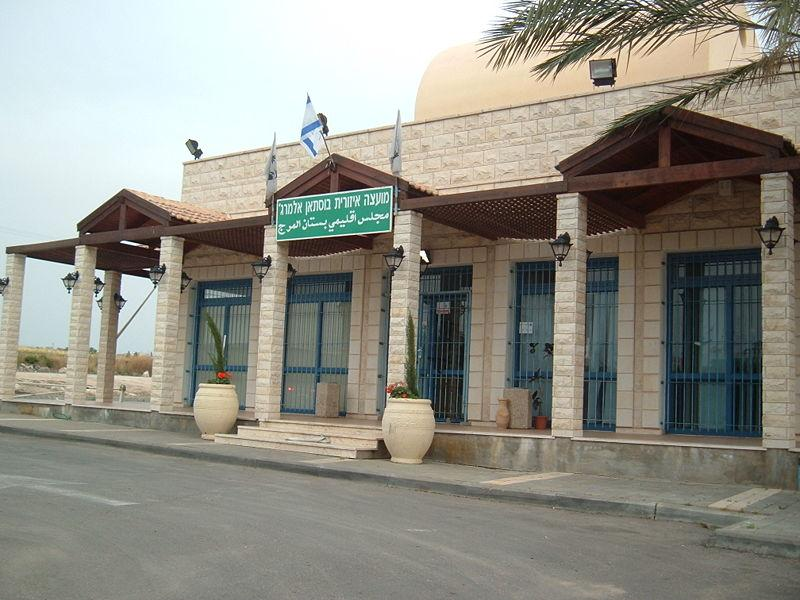
- The offices of the regional council in Afula
- Interactive map of Bustan al-Marj Regional Council
- Country: Israel
- District: Northern
- Subdistrict: Jezreel
- Natural region: Kokhav Plateau, Yizre'el Valley

Government
  - Head of Municipality: Ahmed Zoabi

Area
  - Total: 8,960 dunams (8.96 km^{2}; 3.46 sq mi)

Population (2025)
  - Total: 8,496
  - Density: 948/km^{2} (2,460/sq mi)
- Website: www.bustanelmarg.muni.il

The Bustan al-Marj Regional Council (Hebrew: מועצה אזורית בוסתן אל-מרג', romanized: Mo'atza Azorit Bustan al-Marj; Arabic: مجلس بستان المرج الإقليمي) is a regional council in northern Israel. Its territory lies adjacent to the Jezreel Valley and north of Afula, and includes four Arab villages:

== Villages ==
- Ed-Dahi
- Kafr Misr
- Nein
- Sulam

== Demographics ==
Historical population
| Year | Pop. | ±% |
|---|---|---|
| 1972 | 2,400 | — |
| 1983 | 3,300 | +37.5% |
| 1995 | 4,700 | +42.4% |
| 2008 | 6,700 | +42.6% |
| 2022 | 8,110 | +21.0% |
| 2024 | 8,450 | +4.2% |

== Voting Patterns ==
In the 2022 election, 86 percent of voters in the regional council voted for the Arab parties, while 11 percent voted for the parties of the center-left coalition led by Yair Lapid and 3 percent voted for the parties of the right-wing coalition led by Benjamin Netanyahu.

In the 2026 election, 91 percent of voters in the regional council voted for the Arab parties, while 7 percent voted for the parties of the center-left coalition led by Gadi Eisenkot and 0.5 percent voted for the parties of the right-wing coalition led by Benjamin Netanyahu. An additional 0.04 percent voted for the Reservists. Voter turnout increased 65 percent from the 2022 election.
