= Ed-Dahi =

Arab village near Afula, northern Israel

Ed-Dahi: דַחִי (Hebrew); لدحي (Arabic)

Hebrew transcription(s)
  - Standard: דַחִי
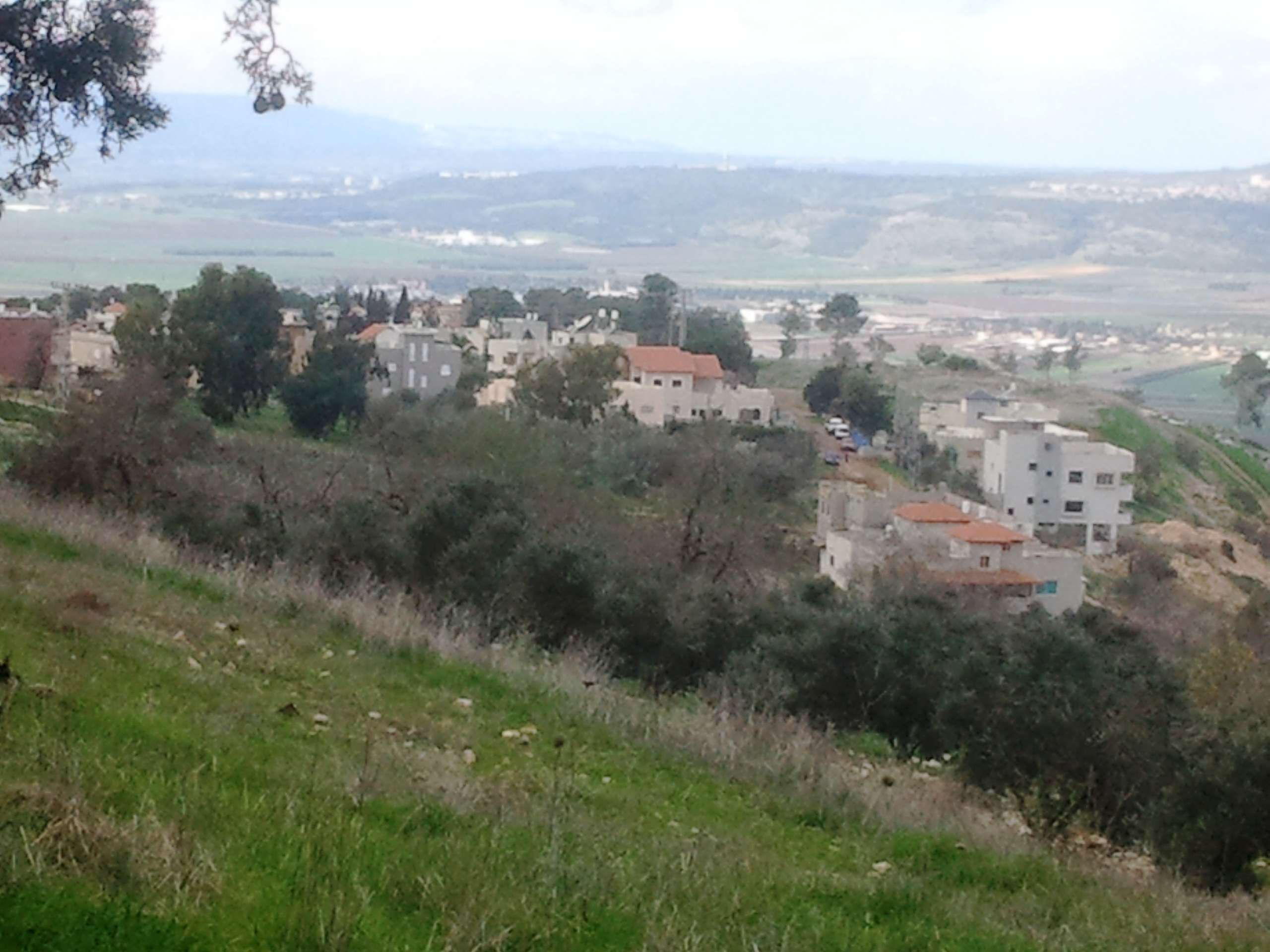
- Etymology: Village of Dŭhy
- Location within Jezreel Valley region of Israel Location within Israel
- Coordinates: 32°37′16″N 35°20′37″E
- Grid position: 182/225 PAL
- Country: Israel
- District: Northern
- Subdistrict: Jezreel
- Council: Bustan al-Marj
- Population (2024): 668

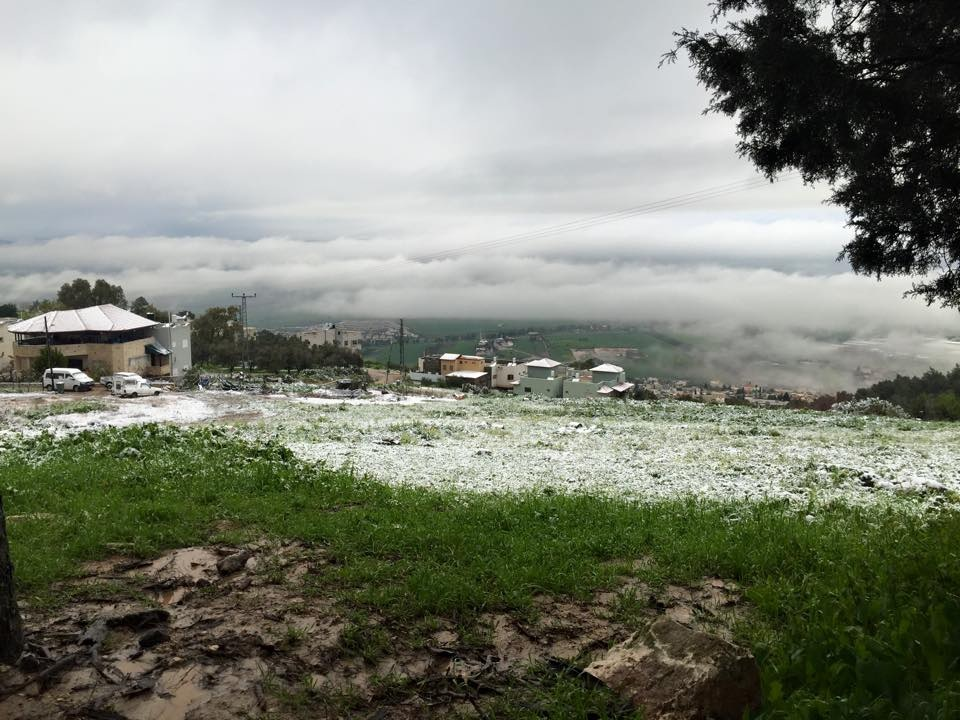
Ed-Dahi in winter 2015

Ed-Dahi (Arabic: الدحي, Hebrew: דַחִי) is an Arab village in northeastern Israel. Located on Givat HaMoreh (Jebel Dahi in Arabic) overlooking Afula, it falls under the jurisdiction of Bustan al-Marj Regional Council. The village is situated at an altitude of 550 meters above sea level. As of 2024 it had a population of 668.

== History ==
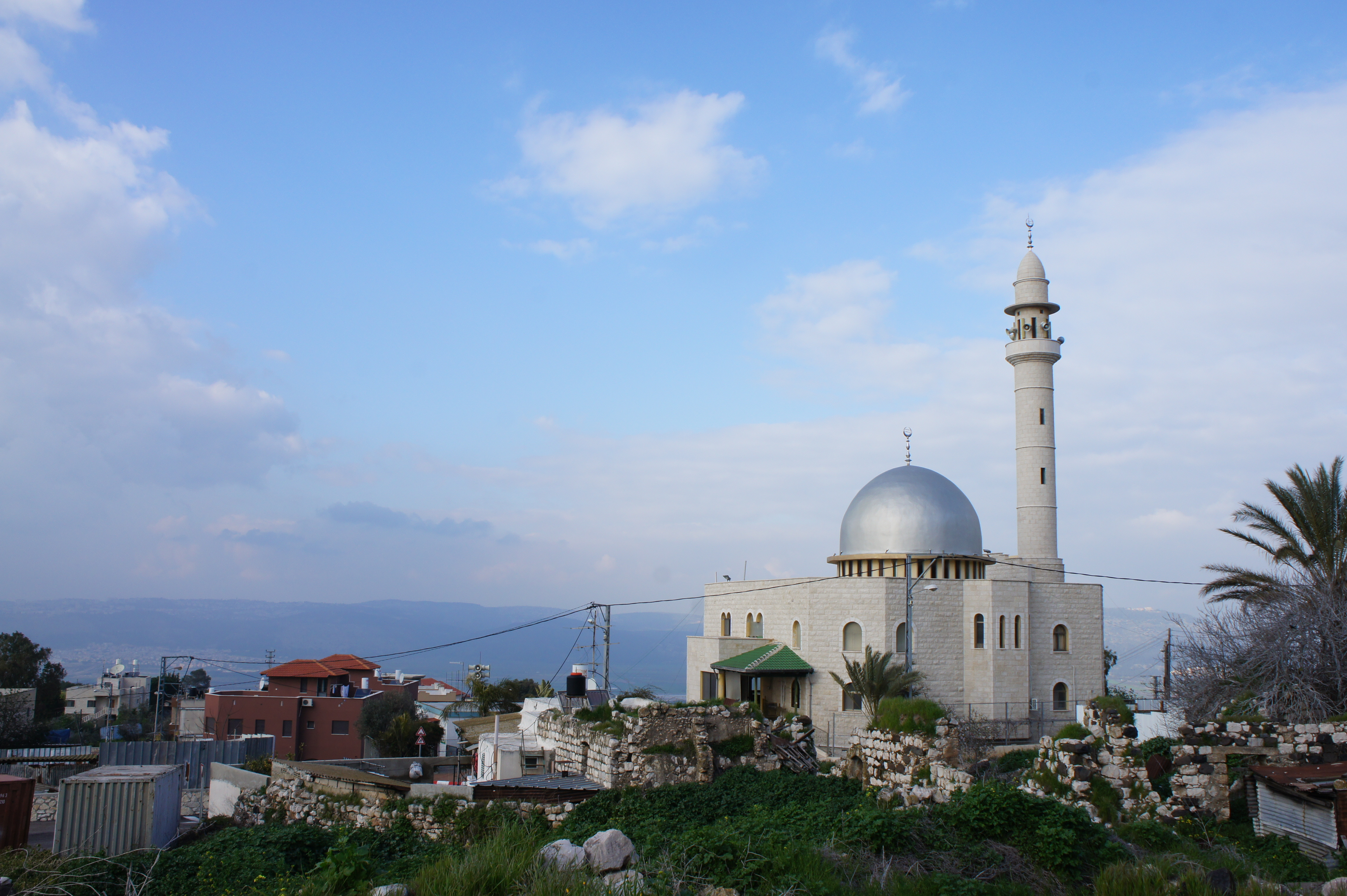
Dahi mosque

Ed-Dahi was named after Dahia Bin Khalifa al-Kalbei, who according to Islamic tradition, was a friend of the Islamic prophet Muhammad. Dahia, an ambassador of Muhammad, attempted to convert Byzantine emperor Heraclius to Islam. According to local tradition, Dahia was killed and buried in the site of the village.

=== Ottoman Empire ===
In 1870–1871 an Ottoman census listed the village in the nahiya (sub-district) of Shafa al-Shamali. In 1875 Victor Guérin found here a small village, consisting of fifteen "miserable" houses, surrounded by gardens and bordered by cactus hedges.

In 1882 the PEF's Survey of Western Palestine (SWP) described it as "a little hamlet of stone cabins, on the saddle west of the conical peak of Jebel ed Duhy. Straggling olives exist on the north and west. The water supply is from a well lower down the hill, on the north."

=== British Mandate ===
In the 1922 census of Palestine conducted by the British authorities, al-Dahi had a population of 84, all Muslims, increasing slightly in the 1931 census to 87, still all Muslim, in a total of 16 houses.

In the 1945 statistics the population was 110, all Muslims, while the total land area was 8,038 dunams, according to an official land and population survey. Of this, 19 dunams were for plantations and irrigable land, 2,979 for cereals, while 10 dunams were classified as built-up areas.

=== Israel ===
In February 2016 Bustan al-Marj Regional Council announced that its offices would move from Afula to Ed-Dahi. Council chairman Ahmed Zoabi noted "The offices are now located in one of the four villages of the council and this is important". In September 2017, the regional council completed its road-paving project.

== See also ==
- Arab localities in Israel

== Bibliography ==
- Barron, J.B., ed. (1923). Palestine: Report and General Abstracts of the Census of 1922. Government of Palestine.
- Conder, C.R.; Kitchener, H.H. (1882). The Survey of Western Palestine: Memoirs of the Topography, Orography, Hydrography, and Archaeology. Vol. 2. London: Committee of the Palestine Exploration Fund.
- Government of Palestine, Department of Statistics (1945). Village Statistics, April, 1945.
- Guérin, V. (1880). Description Géographique Historique et Archéologique de la Palestine (in French). Vol. 3: Galilee, pt. 1. Paris: L'Imprimerie Nationale.
- Hadawi, S. (1970). Village Statistics of 1945: A Classification of Land and Area ownership in Palestine. Palestine Liberation Organization Research Center.
- Mills, E., ed. (1932). Census of Palestine 1931. Population of Villages, Towns and Administrative Areas. Jerusalem: Government of Palestine.
- Palmer, E.H. (1881). The Survey of Western Palestine: Arabic and English Name Lists Collected During the Survey by Lieutenants Conder and Kitchener, R. E. Transliterated and Explained by E.H. Palmer. Committee of the Palestine Exploration Fund.
