= Ein Dor =

Place in northern Israel

Ein Dor: עין דור (Hebrew)
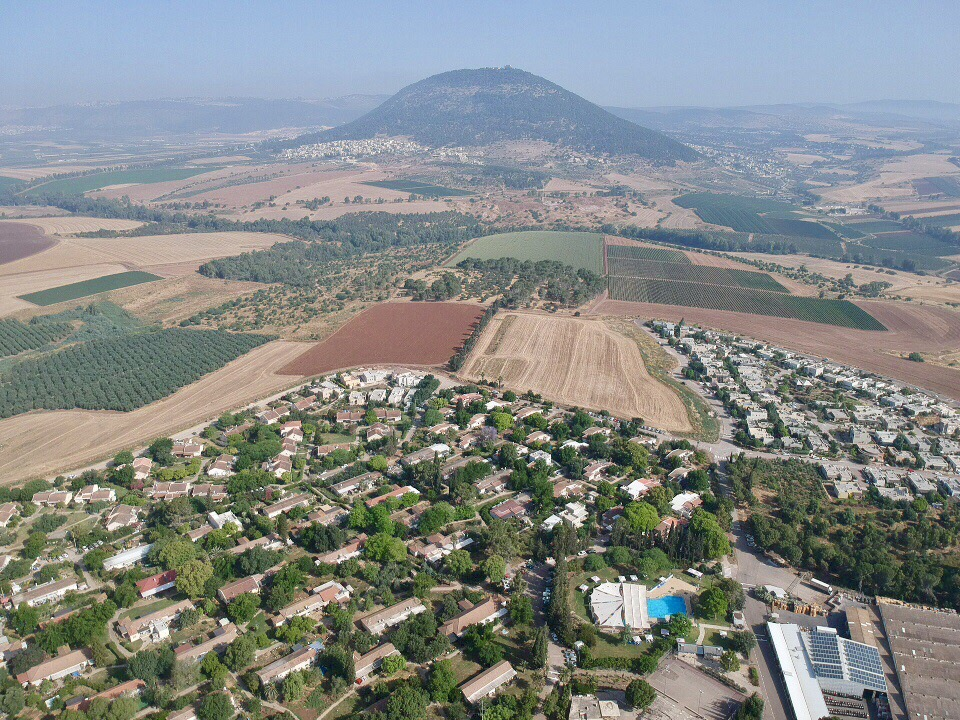

- Location within Jezreel Valley region of Israel
- Coordinates: 32°39′22″N 35°25′2″E
- Country: Israel
- District: Northern
- Subdistrict: Jezreel
- Council: Jezreel Valley
- Affiliation: Kibbutz Movement
- Founded: 1948
- Founder: Hashomer Hatzair
- Population (2024): 1,165

Ein Dor (Hebrew: עֵין דּוֹר, lit. "Dor Spring") is a kibbutz in northern Israel. Located in the Lower Galilee, it falls under the jurisdiction of Jezreel Valley Regional Council. As of 2024 it had a population of 1,165. It was the first Jewish village founded in Israel after the declaration of independence.

== History ==
Kibbutz Ein Dor is named for Endor, a village mentioned in the Bible. The kibbutz was founded in May 1948 by members of the Hashomer Hatzair youth movement. Among the founders were young Zionists from Hungary, Canada, the United States and South Africa.

In 2003 members voted to privatize the kibbutz after many second and third generations had left for the city, prompting worry about the sustainability of the kibbutz. This meant moving the ideological approach of the kibbutz away from its original socialist principles of equality, collectivism and the Marxist ideal of "From each according to his ability, to each according to his need." Some of the kibbutz land was sold for development and a new neighborhood was built, leading to an influx of 80 new families. The kibbutz views homebuyers as part of the community and they are given a say in municipal and community decisions.

== Economy ==
In addition to its income from agriculture, the kibbutz operates Teldor cable and wire factory.

== Notable people ==
- Amnon Lord
- Uzi Shalev
