= Yehezkel Braun =

Israeli composer

Yehezkel Braun יחזקאל בראון
- Born: January 18, 1922; Breslau, Germany
- Origin: Israel
- Died: August 27, 2014 (aged 92) Tel Aviv, Israel
- Genre: Classical
- Occupation: Composer
- Education: Israel Academy of Music; Tel Aviv University
- Awards: Israel Prize (2001)

Yehezkel Braun (Hebrew: יחזקאל בראון; January 18, 1922 – August 27, 2014) was an Israeli composer.

== Biography ==
Yehezkel Braun was born in Breslau, Germany. The family moved to Mandate Palestine when he was two. He grew up surrounded by Jewish and East-Mediterranean traditional music that influenced his later compositions.

During World War II he enlisted in the British Army and saw action in Italy with the Jewish Brigade.

Braun was a graduate of the Israel Academy of Music and held a master's degree in Classical Studies from Tel Aviv University.

In 1975, Braun studied Gregorian chant with Dom Jean Claire at the Benedictine monastery of Solesmes in France. His main academic interests were traditional Jewish melodies and Gregorian chants. He lectured on these and other subjects at universities and congresses in England, France, the United States and Germany. Yehezkel Braun was Professor Emeritus at Tel Aviv University.

Braun died in Tel Aviv on August 27, 2014. He was 92.

== Awards and recognition ==
In 2001, Braun was awarded the Israel Prize, for music.

== See also ==
- Music of Israel
