= Witch of Endor =

Biblical sorceress

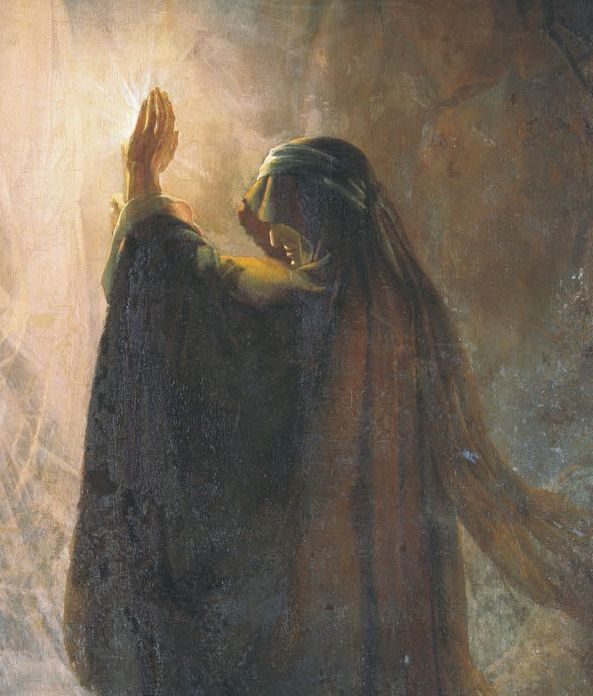
The Witch of Endor, detail of The Witch of Endor Summons the Shade of the Prophet Samuel (Dmitry Nikiforovich Martynov, 1857)

The Witch of Endor (Biblical Hebrew: בַּעֲלַת־אֹוב בְּעֵין דּוֹר, romanized: baʿălaṯ-ʾōḇ bəʿĒyn Dōr, lit. 'mistress of the ʾōḇ in Endor'), according to the Hebrew Bible, was consulted by Saul to summon the spirit of the prophet Samuel. Saul wished to receive advice on defeating the Philistines in battle after prior attempts to consult God through sacred lots and other means had failed. However, what was summoned (whether the actual ghost of Samuel or a spirit impersonating him) delivered a prophecy of doom against Saul and his army, who were defeated. This event occurs in 1 Samuel 28:3–25 and is also mentioned in the deuterocanonical Book of Sirach.

Joseph Blenkinsopp argued that the conventional description of the woman as a "witch" reflects later medieval Christian preconceptions. He described her not as a practitioner of harmful sorcery, but more specifically as a traditional Israelite necromancer or spirit-diviner, translating her Hebrew designation as "mistress of the spirits" or "lady of the pit."

== Etymology ==
The Hebrew Bible calls her "a woman, possessor of an ʾōḇ at En Dor," apparently a settlement around a spring. The word ov (ʾōḇ) has been suggested by Harry A. Hoffner to refer to a ritual pit for summoning the dead from the netherworld based on parallels in other Near Eastern and Mediterranean cultures. The word has cognates in other regional languages (cf. Sumerian ab, Akkadian âbu, Hittite a-a-bi, Ugaritic ib) and the medium or witch of Endor's ritual has parallels in Mesopotamian and Hittite magical texts as well as rites to chthonic deities in the Odyssey.

Other suggestions for a definition of ov include a familiar spirit, a talisman, or a wineskin, in reference to ventriloquism.

In the Septuagint, she is called the engastrímuthos ("belly-talker", an Ancient Greek term for a spirit medium) of Aendōr (Koine Greek: ἐγγαστρίμυθος ἐν Αενδωρ, romanized: engastrímythos en Aendōr). The Latin Vulgate has pythonem in Aendor, both terms referencing then-contemporary pagan oracles.

The medium says that she sees "elohim arising" from the ground, using the word typically translated as "god(s)" to refer to the spirit of the dead. This is also paralleled by the use of the Akkadian cognate word ilu "god" in a similar fashion. In the pre-exilic Judahite religion, ancestral underworld spirits were referred to using the term, which was applicable to such numinous entities and divinities.

== Biblical narrative ==
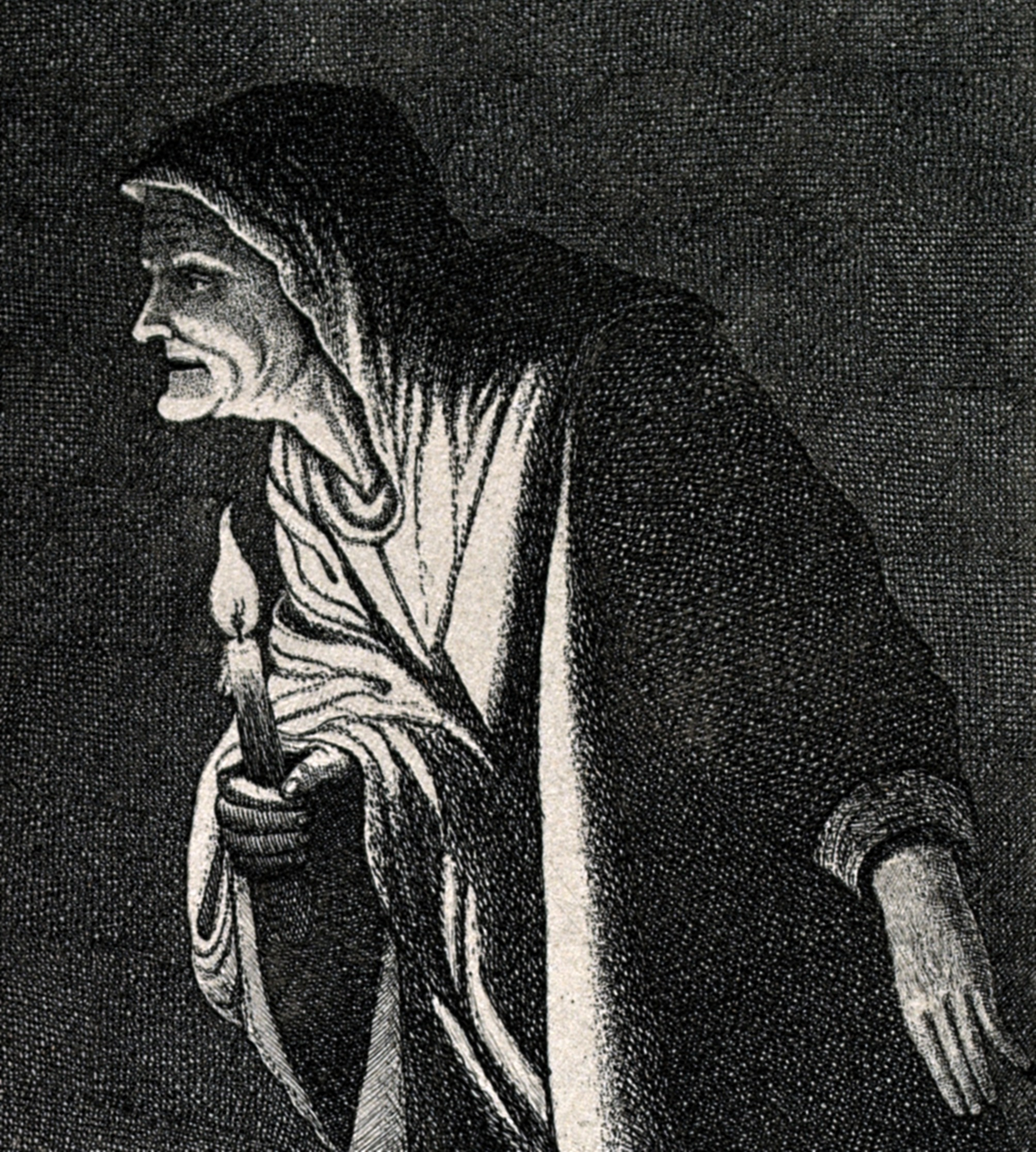
Witch of Endor by Adam Elsheimer.

When the prophet Samuel dies, he is buried in Rama (1 Samuel 25:1; 28:3). Saul, King of Israel, seeks advice from God in choosing a course of action against the assembled forces of the Philistine army. He receives no answer from dreams, prophets, or the Urim and Thummim. Having previously expelled all necromancers and magicians from Israel, Saul anonymously searches for a witch. He is told one is living in the village of Endor, so Saul disguises himself and crosses enemy lines to visit her. He asks the woman to raise Samuel, and she initially refuses, citing Saul's own royal edict against sorcery, but Saul assures her that she will not be punished.

The woman then summons a spirit, and when it appears, she works out who Saul is and screams, "Why have you deceived me? You are Saul!" Saul assures her again that no harm will come to her, then asks what she sees. She says she sees "elohim rising" (plural noun and verb). Then, Saul asks what "he" (singular) looks like, and she describes an old man wrapped in a robe. Saul bows down to the spirit despite being unable to see it himself.

The spirit complains of being disturbed, berates Saul for disobeying God, and predicts Saul's downfall. The living Samuel had previously said Saul would have his kingship removed, but this spirit adds that Israel's army will be defeated, and Saul and his sons will be "with me" tomorrow. Saul collapses in terror; the woman comforts him and prepares him a meal of a fatted calf to restore his strength.

The following day, the Israelite army is defeated as prophesied: Saul is wounded by the Philistines and commits suicide by falling on his sword. Later, a young Amalekite, hoping to impress David, will claim he delivered the death blow, and David will execute him. In 1 Chronicles, it is stated Saul's death was partly punishment for seeking advice from a medium rather than from God.

== Interpretations ==
=== Critical scholarship ===
Theologian and Bible scholar Joseph Blenkinsopp argued that necromancy was an indigenous Israelite and ancient Near Eastern practice, common in patrilineal family tomb rites and ancestral veneration. Blenkinsopp viewed Saul's prohibition of mediums in 1 Samuel 28:3, as evidence of later state sponsored, priestly and deuteronomic efforts to delegitimize domestic family religious practices in order to consolidate Yahwism. Within the narrative itself, he situates it as a recognized Mesopotamian motif of a desperate monarch who was abandoned by standard divine channels, and thus resorts to calling a deceased sage or hero.

Klaus-Peter Adam who surveyed Greek parallels such as Odysseus summoning the deceased prophet Teiresias, and Atossa invoking the ghost of Darius in The Persians, posits that the Greek genre of Nekyia was influential on the authors of 1 Samuel 28.

A. Graeme Auld in his commentary on the Books of Samuel writes that the woman is portrayed sympathetically, and the story does not explicitly condemn the medium for carrying out the ritual. Paul R. Williamson argues that nothing in the narrative implies the experience involved a demon, as both the Witch and Saul understand the apparition to be the ghost of Samuel himself, nor does the text imply it was God who intervened in this netherworld encounter. Neither is it seen that she was being deceptive, the surprise of the medium is specifically directed at discovering the identity of the disguised figure—King Saul.

Owen Davies discusses the reception history of the folktale, and notes that during the European witch trials, the woman of Endor was reframed by commenters into an early form of the diabolical "witch" archetype.

=== Judaism ===
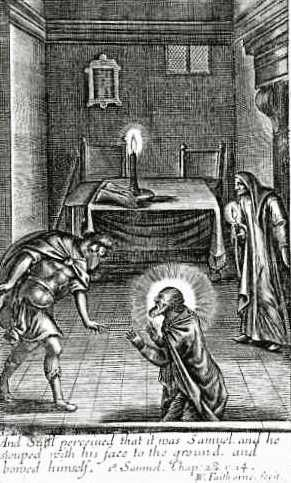
Saul consulting the Witch of Endor, the frontispiece to Saducismus Triumphatus by Joseph Glanvill.

In the Septuagint (2nd century BC), the woman is described as a ventriloquist, possibly reflecting the consistent view of the Alexandrian translators that demons do not exist. On the other hand, the Hebrew Book of Sirach, composed in the same period, represents it as a fact that Samuel prophesied to Saul after his death. Josephus, writing in the 1st century AD, also appears to find the story completely credible. In the Talmud and the Midrash, the view is expressed that Samuel could be summoned from the dead since the soul comes and goes from the body in the first twelve months after a person's death.

The Yalkut Shimoni (11th century) identifies the anonymous witch as the mother of Abner. Based upon the witch's claim to have seen something, and Saul having heard a disembodied voice, the Yalkut suggests that necromancers can see the spirits of the dead but are unable to hear their speech, while the person for whom the deceased was summoned hears the voice but fails to see anything.

According to Antoine Augustin Calmet, writing in the 18th century:

The Jews of our days believe that after the body of a man is interred, his spirit goes and comes, and departs from the spot where it is destined to visit his body, and to know what passes around him; that it is wandering during a whole year after the death of the body, and that it was during that year of delay that the Pythoness of Endor evoked the soul of Samuel, after which time the evocation would have had no power over his spirit.

=== Christianity ===
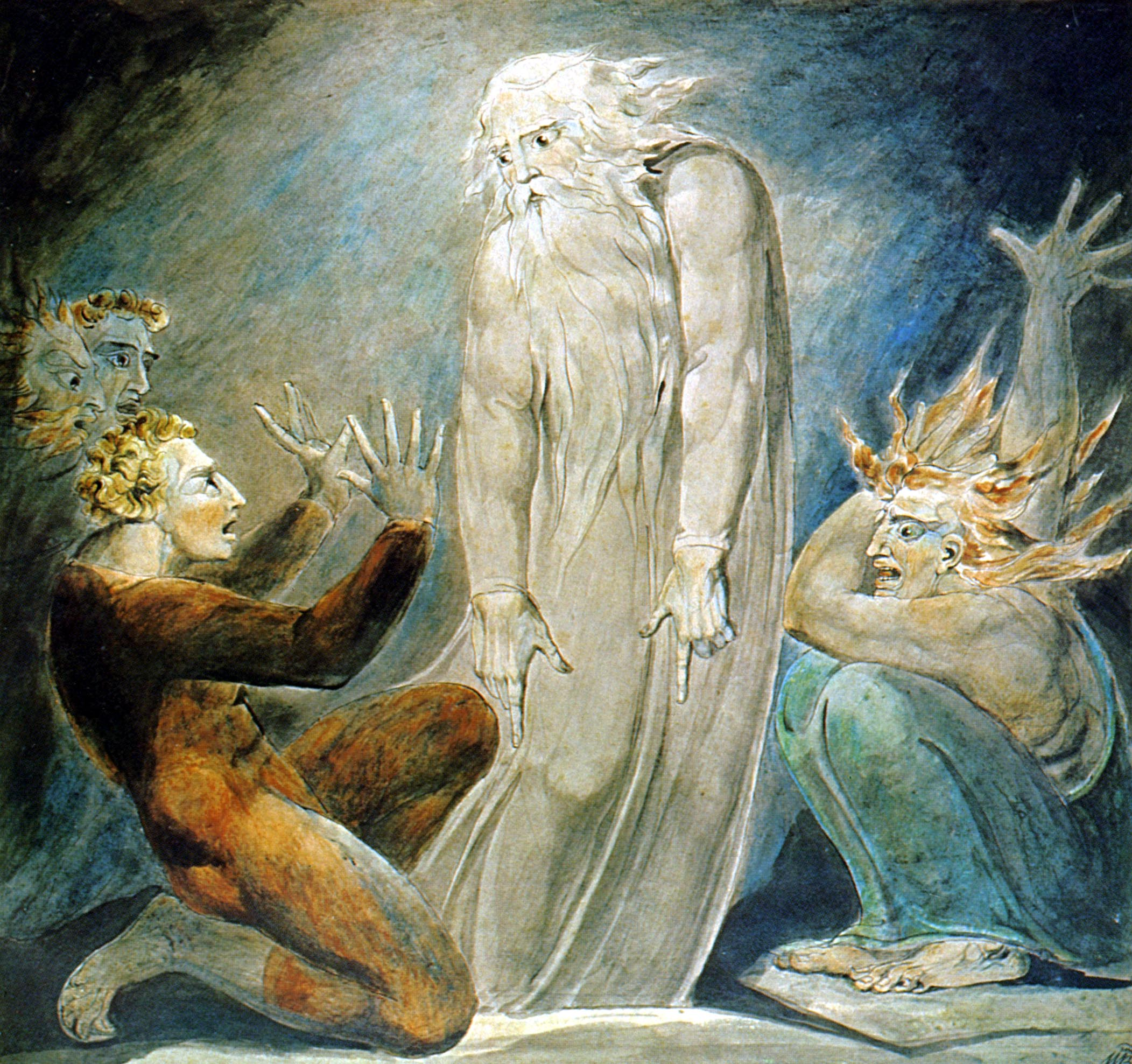
William Blake's painting of Saul, the shade of Samuel and the Witch of Endor.

The Church Fathers and some modern Christian writers have debated the theological issues raised by this text, which would appear at first sight to affirm that it is possible (though forbidden) for humans to summon the spirits of the dead by magic.

King James, in his philosophical treatise Daemonologie (1597), rejected the theory that the witch was performing an act of ventriloquism, but also denied that she had truly summoned the spirit of Samuel. He wrote that the Devil is permitted at times to take on the likeness of the saints, citing 2 Corinthians 11:14, which says that "Satan can transform himself into an Angel of light". James describes the witch of Endor as "Saul's Pythonese", likening her to the ancient Greek oracle Pythia. He asserts the reality of witchcraft, arguing that if such things were not possible, they would not be prohibited in Scripture:

Certain it is, that the Law of God speaks nothing in vain, neither does it lay curses, or enjoin punishments upon shadows, condemning that to be ill, which is not in essence or being as we call it.

Other medieval glosses to the Bible also suggested that what the witch summoned was not the ghost of Samuel, but a demon taking his shape or an illusion crafted by the witch. Martin Luther, who believed that the dead were unconscious, read that it was "the Devil's ghost", whereas John Calvin read that "it was not the real Samuel, but a spectre."

Antoine Augustin Calmet briefly mentions the witch of Endor in his Traité sur les apparitions des esprits et sur les vampires ou les revenans de Hongrie, de Moravie, &c. (1759), among other scriptural proofs of "the reality of magic." He acknowledges that this interpretation is disputed and says that he will deduce nothing from the passage "except that this woman passed for a witch, [and] that Saul esteemed her such."

Since this passage states that the witch made a loud cry in fear when she saw Samuel's spirit, some interpreters reject the suggestion that the witch was responsible for summoning Samuel's spirit, claiming instead it was the work of God. Joyce Baldwin (1989) writes that:

the incident does not tell us anything about the veracity of claims to consult the dead on the part of mediums, because the indications [of the woman’s behavior] are that this was an extraordinary event for her, and a frightening one, because she was not in control.

Grenville Kent summarises the two main historical interpretations: one, that Samuel really appeared, either bodily or in resurrected form; and two, that Samuel was impersonated by a demon in order to destroy Saul. He argues that the latter view matches the text.

=== Spiritualism ===
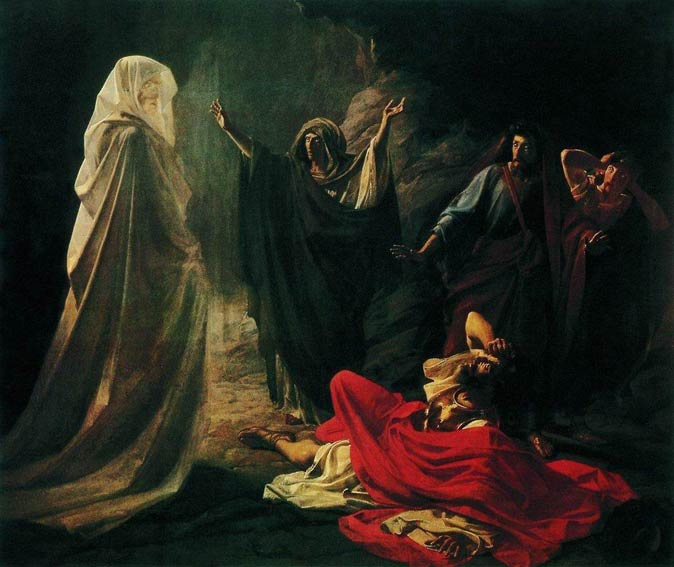
The Witch of Endor summons the shade of Samuel by Nikolai Ge, 1857.

Spiritualists have taken the story as evidence of spirit mediumship in ancient times. The story has been cited in debates between Spiritualist apologists and Christian critics. "The woman of Endor was a medium, respectable, honest, law-abiding, and far more Christ-like than Christian critics of Spiritualism," asserted one Chicago Spiritualist paper in 1875.

== Cultural references ==
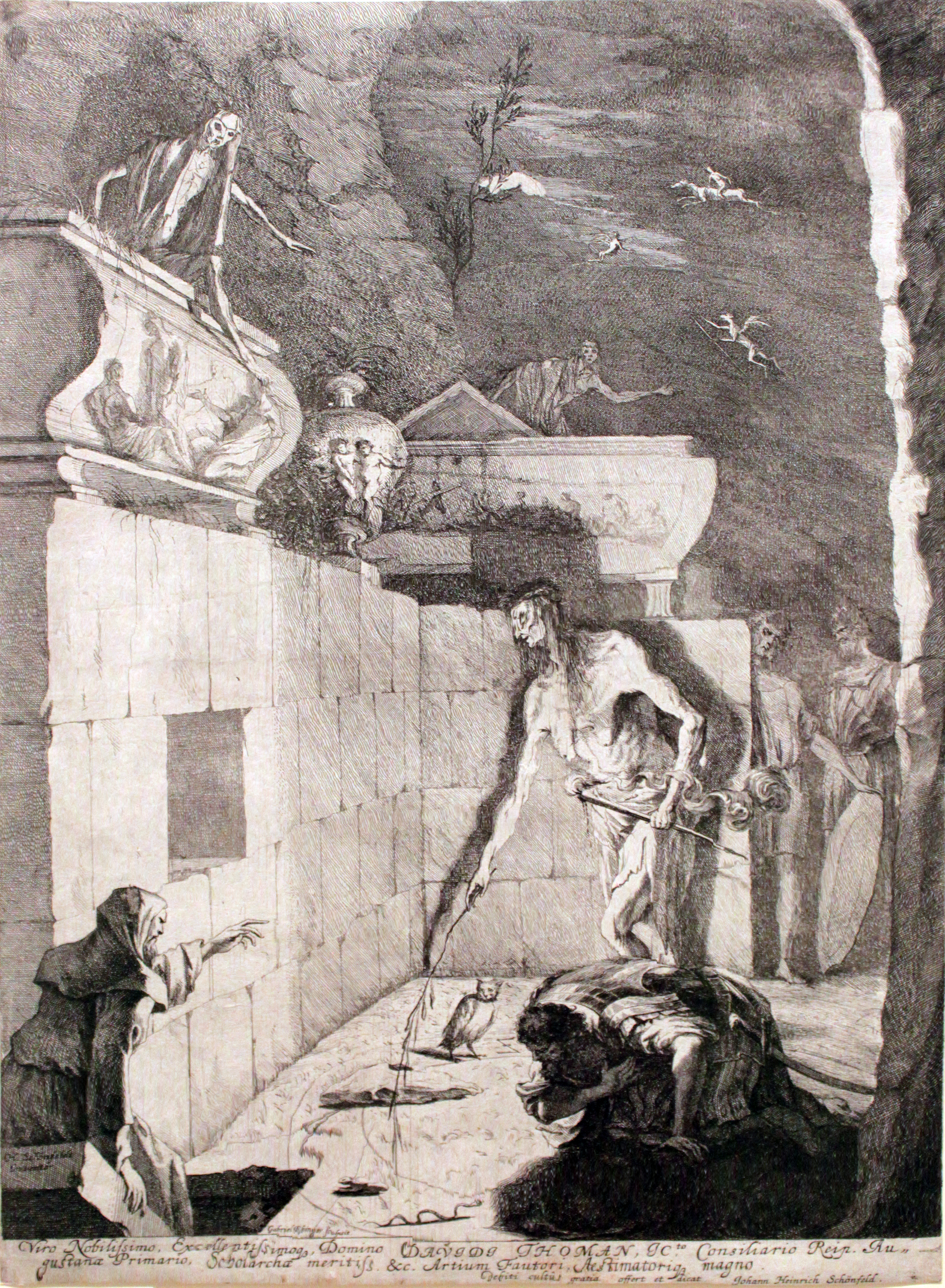
Saul speaking to Samuel's spirit at the Witch of Endor by Gabriel Ehinger, 1675, Städelsches Kunstinstitut.

The story of Saul's consultation with the witch of Endor has frequently been set to music, with many works expanding on the character of the witch. One early example is In guiltie night, an oratorio written by Robert Ramsey in the 1630s, which formed the basis of a better-known work of the same title by Henry Purcell in 1691.

The witch also appears in Mors Saulis et Jonathae by Charpentier (c. 1682), Saul by George Frideric Handel (1738), Die Könige in Israel by Ferdinand Ries (1837), and Le Roi David by Honegger (1921). Notable operas featuring the character include David et Jonathas by Charpentier (1688) and Saul og David by Carl Nielsen (1902). In 1965, the Martha Graham Dance Company premiered The Witch of Endor, a one act ballet with music by William Schuman; this was subsequently reworked into a short piece by American composer Moondog (Louis Hardin) for his 1969 self-titled album.

Poetic works retelling the story include Confessio Amantis, the 14th Century poem by John Gower in Book 4 Sloth (line 1935); "Saul" by Lord Byron, published in his 1815 collection Hebrew Melodies, and "In Endor" by Shaul Tchernichovsky (1893), a major work of modern Hebrew poetry which paints Saul as a sympathetic figure. Rudyard Kipling, a year after the death of his son at the Battle of Loos, wrote a poem called "En-Dor", using the story to criticise contemporary mediums.

In literature another early example appears in Chaucer's Canterbury Tales as part of the Friar's Tale. This was believed to be written around 1390, and has the line "...and speke as renably and faire and wel, as to the Phitonissa dide Samuel." This uses the term now rendered as pythoness, for a female soothsayer.

In theatre, the witch of Endor figures in Laurence Housman's 1944 play Samuel the Kingmaker, and has a central role in Howard Nemerov's 1961 play Endor. The character has been portrayed cinematically by Israeli actor Dov Reiser in the 1976 television film The Story of David, and by Belgian actress Lyne Renée in the 2016 series Of Kings and Prophets.

The character of Endora, the mother of the heroine Samantha on the television show Bewitched, may be named for the Witch of Endor.

The Witch of Endor is a name occasionally given to ships, both real and in fiction, such as in the Horatio Hornblower novels and the Sci Fi series The Expanse.

In music, the Witch of Endor is mentioned in the last verse of the song "Lover, Leaver" by Greta Van Fleet.

In music, the Witch of Endor is an instrumental song featured in Moondog's 1969 album ''Moondog''. [Moondog (1969 album) - Wikipedia]

The Witch of Endor is also a plot point in The Secrets of the Immortal Nicholas Flamel by Michael Scott.

== See also ==
- Sheol
- Underworld
