= Indur =

Indur إندور/عين دور Endor
- Village
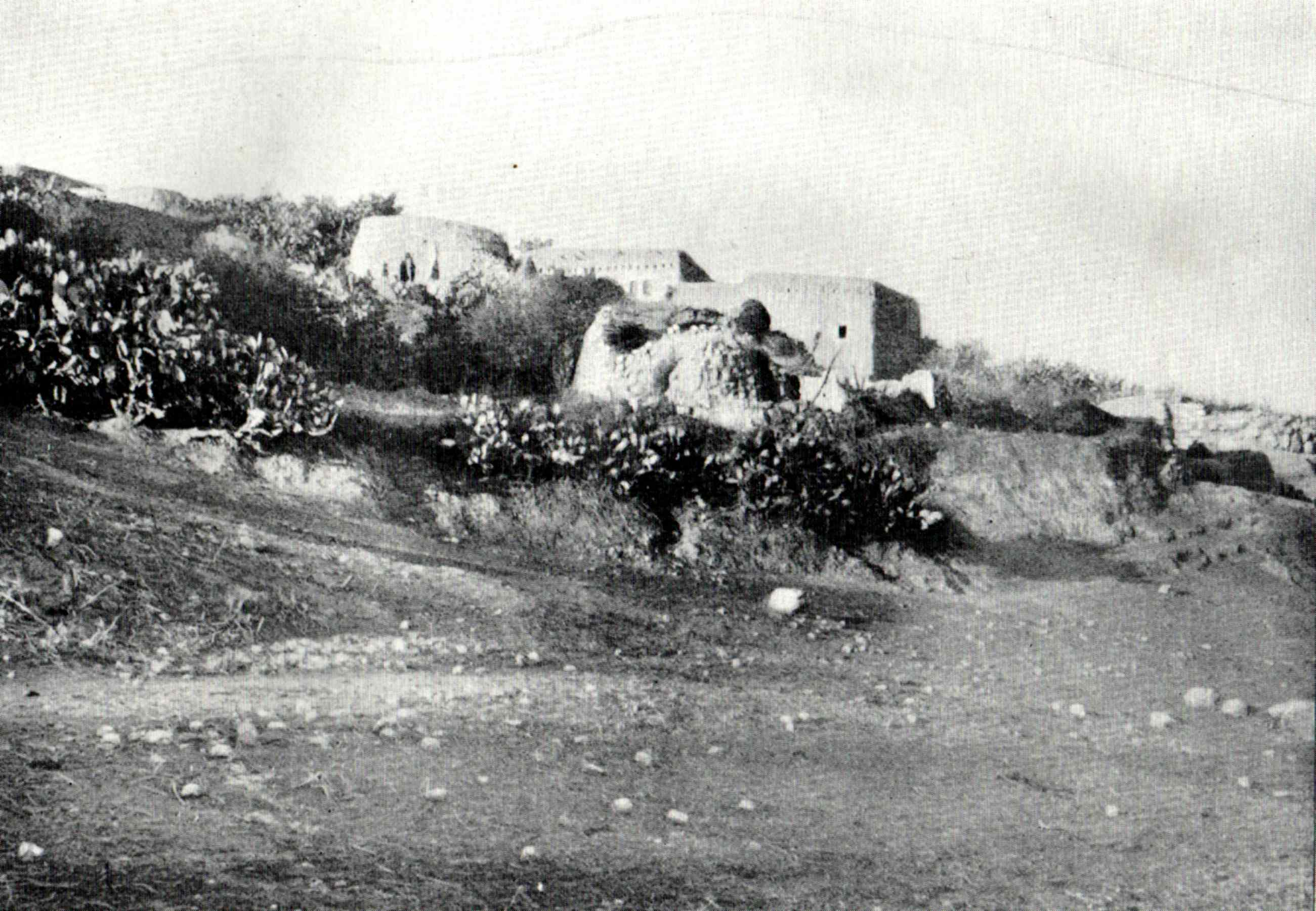
- Indur in the 1890s.
- Etymology: Endor
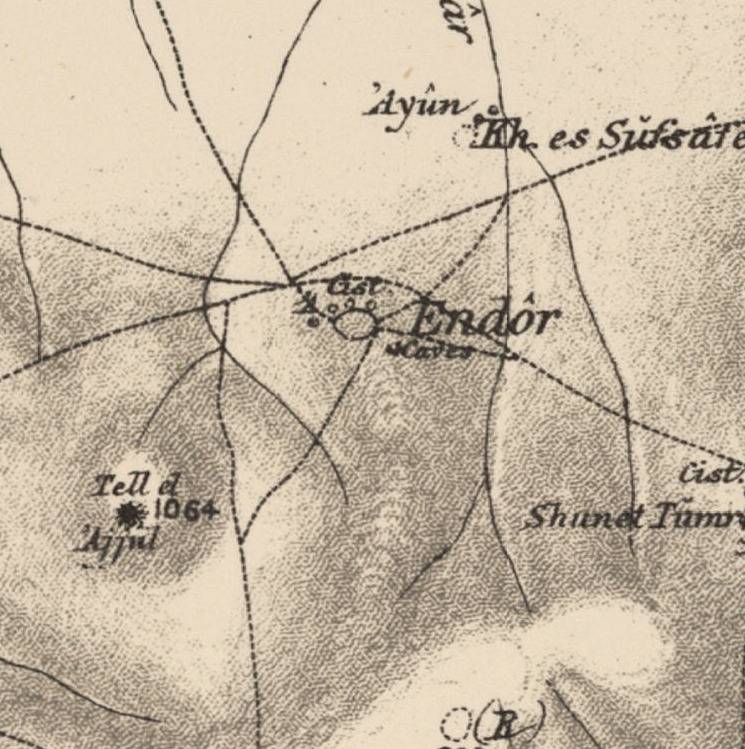
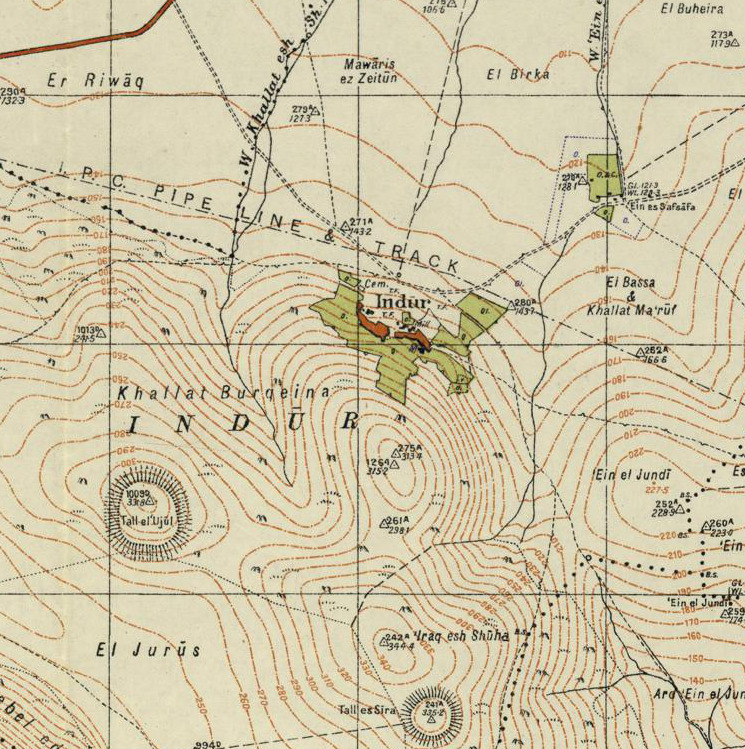
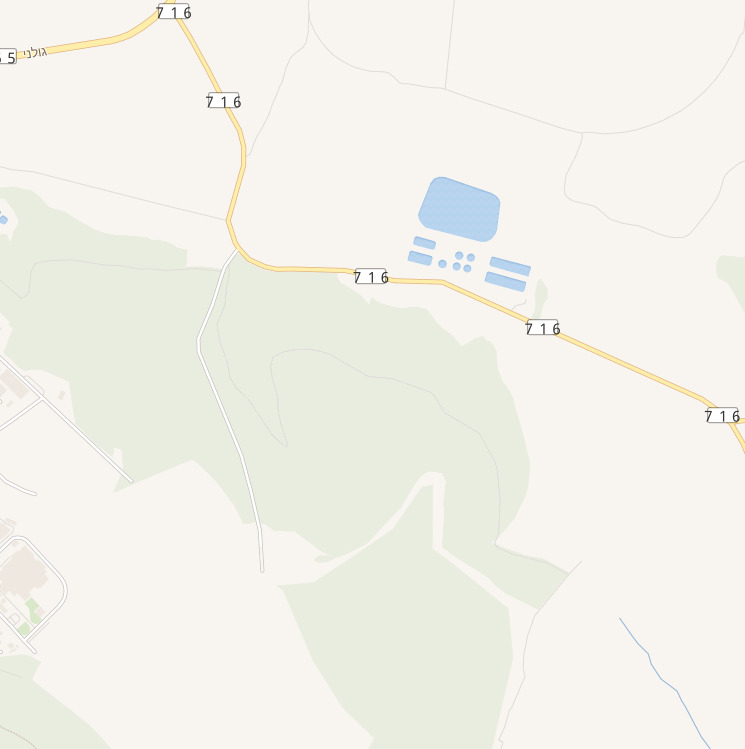
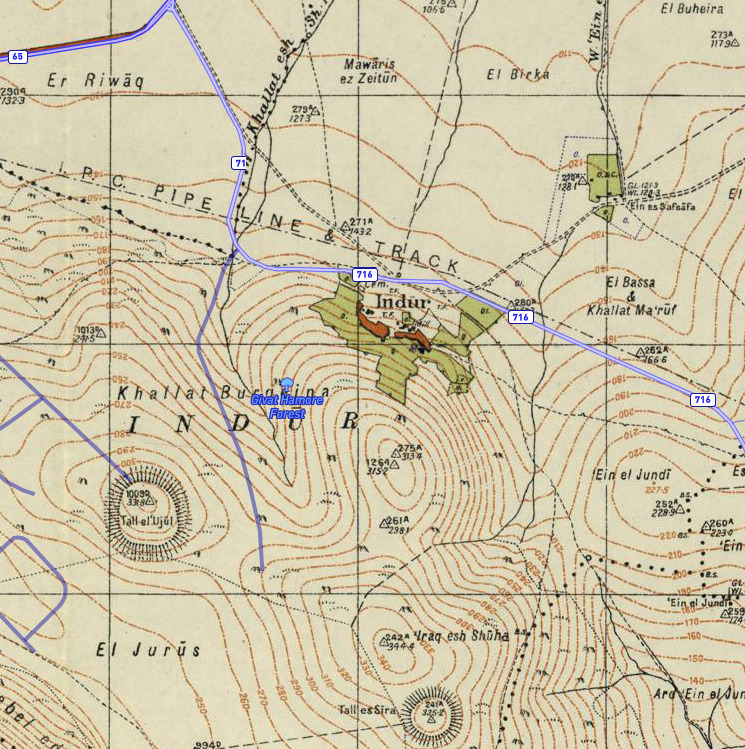
- 1870s map 1940s map modern map 1940s with modern overlay map A series of historical maps of the area around Indur (click the buttons)

- Location within Mandatory Palestine
- Coordinates: 32°38′11″N 35°22′53″E
- Palestine grid: 186/227
- Geopolitical entity: Mandatory Palestine
- Subdistrict: Nazareth
- Date of depopulation: 24 May 1948

Area
  - Total: 12.4 km^{2} (4.8 sq mi)

Population (1945)
  - Total: 620
- Cause(s) of depopulation: Military assault by Yishuv forces
- Secondary cause: Influence of nearby town's fall
- Current Localities: None

Indur (Arabic: إندور) was a Palestinian village, located 10.5 kilometres (6.5 mi) southeast of Nazareth. Its name preserves that of ancient Endor, a Canaanite city state thought to have been located 1 kilometre (0.62 mi) to the northeast. The village was depopulated during the 1948 Arab–Israeli War and its inhabitants became refugees, some of whom were internally displaced. In Israel today, there are a few thousand internally displaced Palestinians who hail from Indur, and continue to demand their right of return.

== Etymology ==
The name of this village is thought to preserve that of the ancient Canaanite city of Endor mentioned in the Bible as the place King Saul encountered a known medium. While a few scholars believe that Indur is the actual site of ancient Endor, no ancient remains have been found at the site, and many believe that Khirbet Safsafa, located 1 kilometre (0.62 mi) to the northeast, is a more likely candidate.

== History ==
In 1596, Indur was a part of the Ottoman nahiya ("subdistrict") of Shafa under the liwa' ("district") of Lajjun with a population of 4 Muslim households, an estimated twenty-two persons. The villagers paid a fixed tax rate of 25% on a number of crops, including wheat, barley and olives, as well as goats and beehives; a total of 3,000 akçe

A map by Pierre Jacotin from Napoleon's invasion of 1799 showed the place, named as Handourah.

By the late nineteenth century, the village was made of adobe bricks, built against a steep hillside. To the east of the village there were several caves.

=== British Mandate era ===
In Ottoman era Palestine, an elementary school was founded in Indur, but closed during the British Mandate in Palestine.

According to the 1922 census of Palestine, Indur had 311 inhabitants; 310 Muslims and 1 Christian, where the one Christian was Orthodox. By the 1931 census the population had increased to 445; 444 Muslims and 1 Christian, in a total of 75 houses.

Sheikh Tawfiq Ibrahim, one of the leaders of the 1936–39 Arab revolt in Palestine and an associate of Izz ad-Din al-Qassam, was from Indur.

In the 1945 statistics the population of Indur was 620 Muslims, with a total of 12,444 dunams of land, according to an official land and population survey. Of this, 24 dunams were for citrus and bananas, 394 for plantations and irrigable land, 10,061 for cereals, while 29 dunams were built-up land.

=== 1948, and aftermath ===
The village was occupied by Israel's Golani Brigade on May 16, 1948. Most of the population probably fled at the start of the battle, and several who "tried to escape" were shot. A small garrison was left, which reported that the remaining population were being expelled in the direction of Nazareth.

In 1992 the village site was described: "Many partially ruined walls still stand on the village site. Date, doum palm, fig, and almond trees grow on the village lands. The surrounding flat lands are cultivated by Israelis and the hilly lands serve as grazing area."

During the 2004 commemorations of Nakba Day held by Palestinian Arab citizens of Israel, the annual right of return march led to Indur. Jewish Israelis joined in the march and the event received coverage by Israeli cable and Arab satellite TV stations.

Indur's former residents and their descendants number a few thousand from among the tens of thousands of internally displaced Palestinians within Israel today.

== See also ==
- Depopulated Palestinian locations in Israel
- List of villages depopulated during the Arab–Israeli conflict

== Bibliography ==
- Barron, J.B., ed. (1923). Palestine: Report and General Abstracts of the Census of 1922. Government of Palestine.
- Conder, C.R.; Kitchener, H.H. (1882). The Survey of Western Palestine: Memoirs of the Topography, Orography, Hydrography, and Archaeology. Vol. 2. London: Committee of the Palestine Exploration Fund.
- Department of Statistics (1945). Village Statistics, April, 1945. Government of Palestine.
- Freedman, D.N.; Myers, Allen C.; Beck, Astrid B. (2000). Eerdmans dictionary of the Bible (Illustrated ed.). Wm. B. Eerdmans Publishing. ISBN 0-8028-2400-5.
- Guérin, V. (1880). Description Géographique Historique et Archéologique de la Palestine (in French). Vol. 3: Galilee, pt. 1. Paris: L'Imprimerie Nationale.
- Hadawi, S. (1970). Village Statistics of 1945: A Classification of Land and Area ownership in Palestine. Palestine Liberation Organization Research Center.
- Hütteroth, W.-D.; Abdulfattah, K. (1977). Historical Geography of Palestine, Transjordan and Southern Syria in the Late 16th Century. Erlanger Geographische Arbeiten, Sonderband 5. Erlangen, Germany: Vorstand der Fränkischen Geographischen Gesellschaft. ISBN 3-920405-41-2.
- Karmon, Y. (1960). "An Analysis of Jacotin's Map of Palestine" (PDF). Israel Exploration Journal. 10 (3, 4): 155–173, 244–253. Archived from the original (PDF) on 2019-12-22.
- Khalidi, W. (1992). All That Remains: The Palestinian Villages Occupied and Depopulated by Israel in 1948. Washington D.C.: Institute for Palestine Studies. ISBN 0-88728-224-5.
- Mazar, B. (1971). The world history of the Jewish people. Allen. ISBN 0-491-00364-1.
- Mills, E., ed. (1932). Census of Palestine 1931. Population of Villages, Towns and Administrative Areas. Jerusalem: Government of Palestine.
- The Encyclopedia Americana. Grolier Incorporated. 2000.
- Morris, B. (2004). The Birth of the Palestinian Refugee Problem Revisited. Cambridge University Press. ISBN 978-0-521-00967-6.
- Negev, Avraham; Gibson, S. (2005). Archaeological Encyclopedia of the Holy Land (Illustrated, revised ed.). Continuum International Publishing Group. ISBN 0-8264-8571-5.
- Palmer, E.H. (1881). The Survey of Western Palestine: Arabic and English Name Lists Collected During the Survey by Lieutenants Conder and Kitchener, R. E. Transliterated and Explained by E.H. Palmer. Committee of the Palestine Exploration Fund.
