= Nein =

Arab town in northern Israel

Nein: ניין (Hebrew); نين (Arabic)
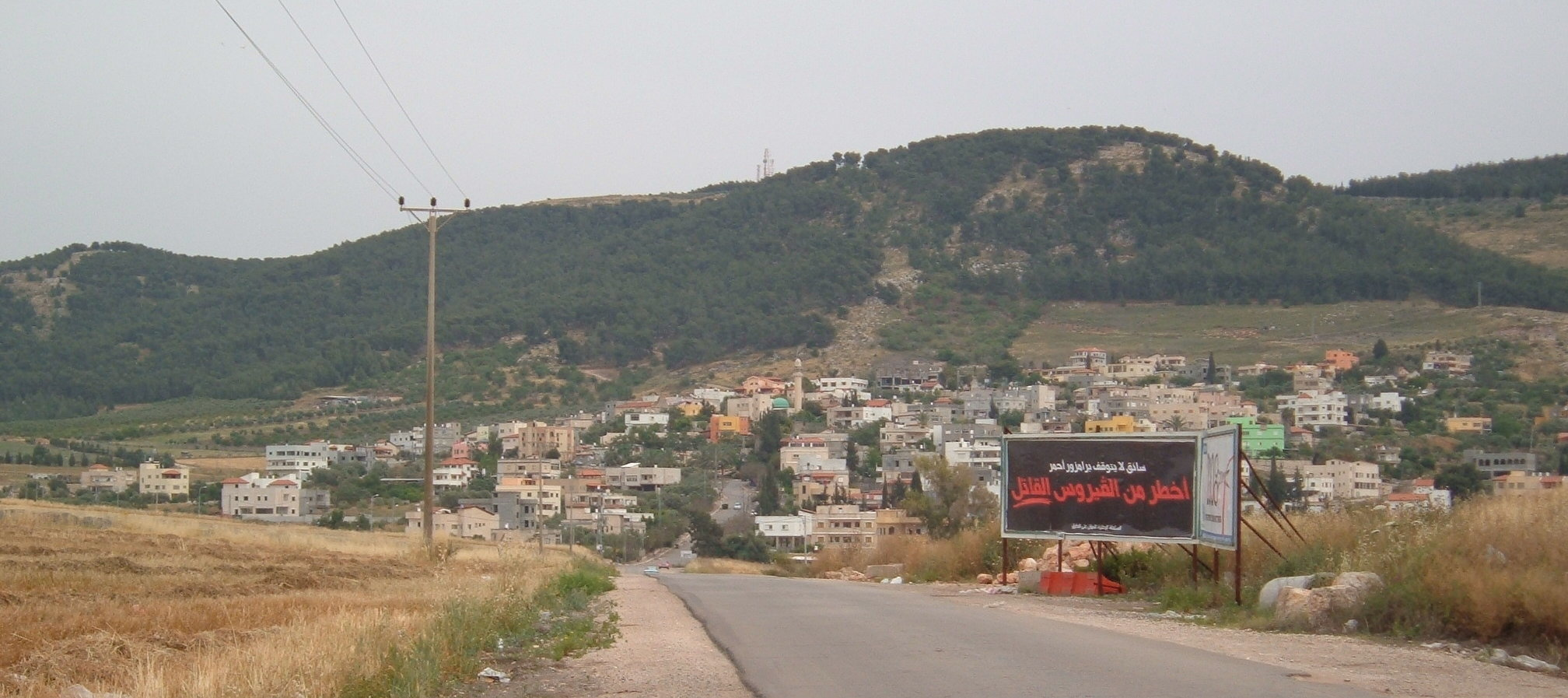

- Location within Jezreel Valley region of Israel Location within Israel
- Coordinates: 32°37′50″N 35°21′0″E
- Grid position: 183/226 PAL
- Country: Israel
- District: Northern
- Subdistrict: Jezreel
- Council: Bustan al-Marj
- Population (2024): 2,033

Nein (Arabic: نين, Nayin, lit. Charming, Hebrew: ניין) — also Nain or Naim in English — is an Arab village in northern Israel. Located in the Lower Galilee, 14 kilometers (8.7 mi) south of Nazareth, Nein covers a land area of approximately 1,000 dunams (250 acres) and falls under the jurisdiction of Bustan al-Marj Regional Council, whose headquarters it hosts. Its total land area consisted of 3,737 dunums prior to 1962. According to the Israeli Central Bureau of Statistichad a population of 2,033.

== Location ==
Nein lies a short distance from Mount Tabor. A hill known in Arabic as Tell el-Ajul lay on the path that ran between Nein and nearby Indur, an Arab village destroyed in the 1948 Arab-Israeli war. Biblical archaeologist Edward Robinson describes Nein as lying on the northern slope of a hill called "the little Hermon", and it is described in biblical guidebooks as lying at the foot of the Hill of Moreh.

== History ==
=== Antiquity ===
Rock-sunk tombs have been found here, probably of Christian origin.

Nein is mentioned in the writing of Eusebius (c. 263–339) and Jerome (c. 347–420) as being situated near Endor (Indur). Its identity as a biblical site was recognized by the Crusaders, who built a church there to commemorate the site of the miracle, a church rebuilt by the Franciscans.

=== Crusader period ===
In 1101, during the Crusader era, Tancred, Prince of Galilee granted Nein together with several other villages to the abbey of Mount Tabor. In 1153, it belonged to the Hospitallers. By 1263, the area was ruled by the Mamluk sultan Baybars.

=== Ottoman Empire ===
Nein, like the rest of Palestine, was incorporated into the Ottoman Empire in 1517, and in the census of 1596, the village was located in the nahiya of Safa in the liwa of Lajjun. It had a population of 119 households, all Muslim. They paid a fixed tax-rate of 25% on agricultural products, including wheat, barley, summer crops, olive trees, goats and beehives, in addition to winter pastures and occasional revenues; the taxes totalled 80,000 akçe.

In 1838 Robinson and Smith noted that Nein had decreased in size over the ages, and was at that time a small hamlet, inhabited by a few families. In 1875 Victor Guérin saw here a ruined building, measuring 18 times 12 paces.

In the Palestine Exploration Fund's Survey of Western Palestine (1882), Nein was described as a small village made of stone and adobe, with a small mosque, named Mukam Sidna Aisa, to the north.

=== British Mandate ===
In the 1922 census of Palestine conducted by the British authorities, Nain had a population of 157, all Muslims, increasing in the 1931 census to 189, still all Muslim, in a total of 34 houses.

In the 1945 statistics the population was 270, all Muslims, while the total land area was 4,687 dunams (1,158 acres), according to an official land and population survey. Of this, 87 dunams (21 acres) were for plantations and irrigable land, 3,602 for cereals, while 31 dunams were classified as built-up areas.

== New Testament associations ==
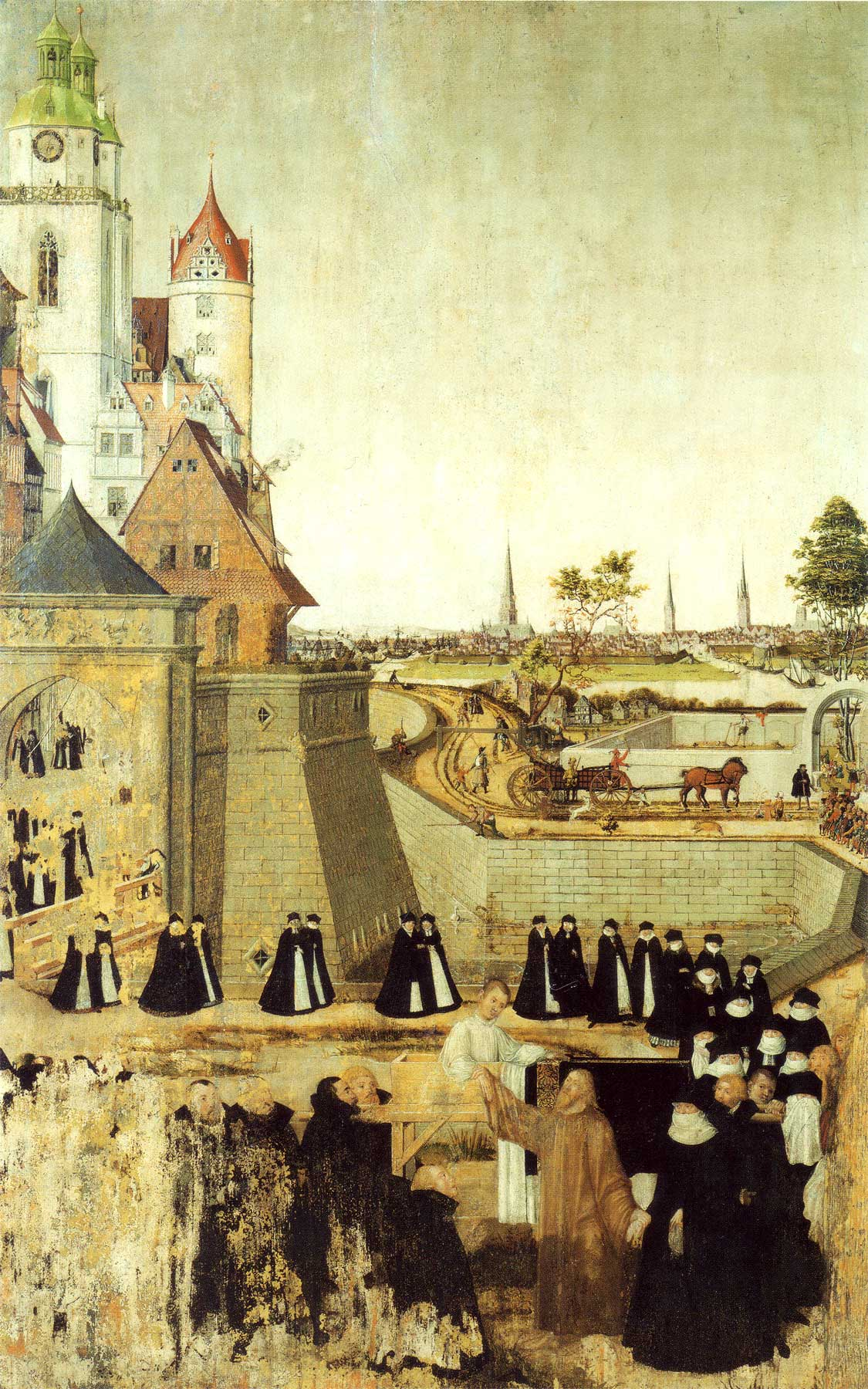
The raising of the young man of Nain, by Lucas Cranach, in 1569.

Edward Robinson and Eli Smith, who visited Palestine in the mid-19th century, identified Nein as "the Nain of the New Testament" (Greek: Ναΐν) where, according to Luke 7:11–17, Jesus raised a young man from death and reunited him with his mother. According to Luke's account, this young man was the only son of an unnamed widow. When Jesus saw the dead son being carried out and the mourning widow, he felt compassion for her. He walked towards the bier or stretcher, touched it, stopped the funeral procession and told the man: "Young man, I say to you, arise!" The man came alive, sat up, and began to speak. The people who were standing around were all struck by the event, seen as a sign that 'a great prophet' had arisen among them, and the report of it spread widely across Judea and the surrounding region. Nain is not mentioned in the other canonical gospels.

== Bibliography ==
- Abu Raya, Rafeh (11 June 2006). "Nein". Hadashot Arkheologiyot – Excavations and Surveys in Israel (118).
- Abu Zidan, Fadi (7 October 2011). "Nein". Hadashot Arkheologiyot – Excavations and Surveys in Israel (123).
- Abu Zidan, Fadi (31 December 2014). "Nein". Hadashot Arkheologiyot – Excavations and Surveys in Israel (126).
- Avshalom-Gorni, Dina (16 August 2011). "Nein". Hadashot Arkheologiyot – Excavations and Surveys in Israel (123).
- Barron, J.B., ed. (1923). Palestine: Report and General Abstracts of the Census of 1922. Government of Palestine.
- Carta (1999). The River Jordan: An Illustrated Guide from Bible Days to the Present (Illustrated ed.). Kregel Publications. ISBN 9780825423765.
- Conder, C.R.; Kitchener, H.H. (1882). The Survey of Western Palestine: Memoirs of the Topography, Orography, Hydrography, and Archaeology. Vol. 2. London: Committee of the Palestine Exploration Fund.
- Covello-Paran, Karen (17 April 2011). "Nein-'En Ha-More (N)". Hadashot Arkheologiyot – Excavations and Surveys in Israel (122).
- Dalali-Amos, Edna (25 January 2008). "Nein (A)". Hadashot Arkheologiyot – Excavations and Surveys in Israel (120).
- Dalali-Amos, Edna (2 April 2008). "Nein (B)". Hadashot Arkheologiyot – Excavations and Surveys in Israel (120).
- Dalali-Amos, Edna (3 September 2014). "Nein". Hadashot Arkheologiyot – Excavations and Surveys in Israel (126).
- Dauphin, C. (1998). La Palestine byzantine, Peuplement et Populations. BAR International Series 726 (in French). Vol. III : Catalogue. Oxford: Archeopress. ISBN 0-860549-05-4.
- Department of Statistics (1945). Village Statistics, April, 1945. Government of Palestine.
- Guérin, V. (1880). Description Géographique Historique et Archéologique de la Palestine (in French). Vol. 3: Galilee, pt. 1. Paris: L'Imprimerie Nationale.
- Hadawi, S. (1970). Village Statistics of 1945: A Classification of Land and Area ownership in Palestine. Palestine Liberation Organization Research Center.
- Hanna, Butros (15 March 2010). "Nein Final Report". Hadashot Arkheologiyot – Excavations and Surveys in Israel (122).
- Hütteroth, W.-D.; Abdulfattah, K. (1977). Historical Geography of Palestine, Transjordan and Southern Syria in the Late 16th Century. Erlanger Geographische Arbeiten, Sonderband 5. Erlangen, Germany: Vorstand der Fränkischen Geographischen Gesellschaft. ISBN 3-920405-41-2.
- Mills, E., ed. (1932). Census of Palestine 1931. Population of Villages, Towns and Administrative Areas. Jerusalem: Government of Palestine.
- Mokary, Abdalla (23 July 2009). "Nein (A)". Hadashot Arkheologiyot – Excavations and Surveys in Israel (121).
- Mokary, Abdalla (11 September 2009). "Nein (B)". Hadashot Arkheologiyot – Excavations and Surveys in Israel (121).
- Mokary, Abdalla (15 September 2009). "Nein (C)". Hadashot Arkheologiyot – Excavations and Surveys in Israel (121).
- Mokary, Abdalla (1 December 2010). "Nein". Hadashot Arkheologiyot – Excavations and Surveys in Israel (122).
- Mokary, Abdalla (12 December 2010). "Nein (West)". Hadashot Arkheologiyot – Excavations and Surveys in Israel (122).
- Palmer, E.H. (1881). The Survey of Western Palestine: Arabic and English Name Lists Collected During the Survey by Lieutenants Conder and Kitchener, R. E. Transliterated and Explained by E.H. Palmer. Committee of the Palestine Exploration Fund.
- Pringle, D. (1998). The Churches of the Crusader Kingdom of Jerusalem: L-Z (excluding Tyre). Vol. II. Cambridge University Press. ISBN 0-521-39037-0.
- Robinson, E.; Smith, E. (1841). Biblical Researches in Palestine, Mount Sinai and Arabia Petraea: A Journal of Travels in the year 1838. Vol. 3. Boston: Crocker & Brewster.
- Röhricht, R. (1893). (RRH) Regesta regni Hierosolymitani (MXCVII-MCCXCI) (in Latin). Berlin: Libraria Academica Wageriana.
- Röhricht, R. (1904). (RRH Ad) Regesta regni Hierosolymitani Additamentum (in Latin). Berlin: Libraria Academica Wageriana.
- van de Velde, C.W.M. (1858). Memoir to Accompany the Map of the Holy Land. Gotha: Justus Perthes.
- Zidan, Omar (19 December 2013). "Nein". Hadashot Arkheologiyot – Excavations and Surveys in Israel (125).
