= Givat HaMoreh =

Mountain in Israel

Coordinates: 32°36′57″N 35°21′49″E

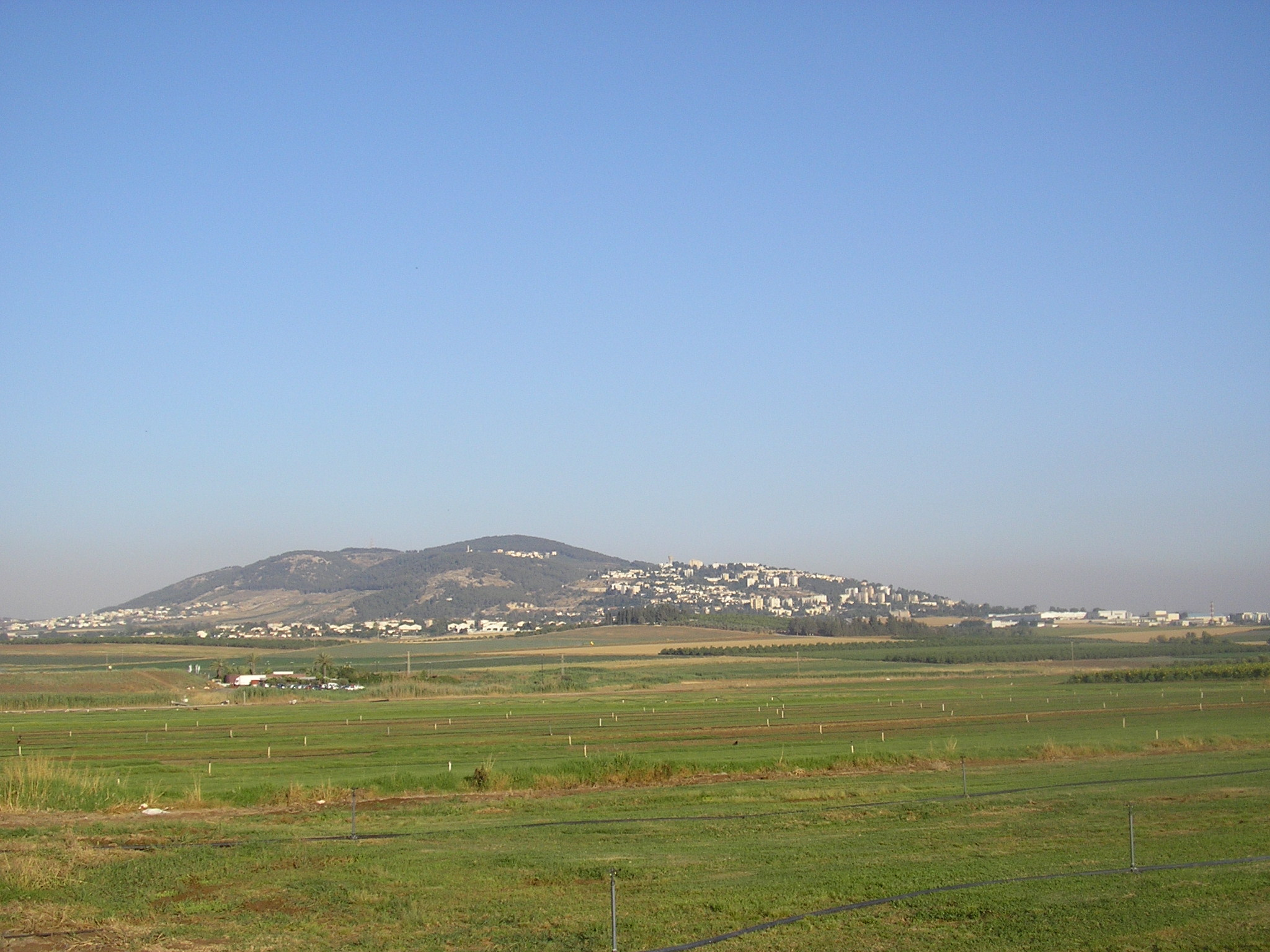
"Givat HaMoreh" (Moreh Hill) south of Mount Tabor

Givat HaMoreh (Hebrew: גבעת המוֹרֶה, Arabic: جبل الدحي, romanized: Jebel ed-Dahi) is a hill in northern Israel on the northeast side of the Jezreel Valley. The highest peak reaches an altitude of 515 metres (1,690 ft), while the bottom of the Jezreel Valley is situated at an altitude of 50–100 metres (160–330 ft). North of it are the plains of the Lower Galilee and Mount Tabor. To the east, Giv'at HaMoreh connects to the Issachar Plateau. To the southeast it descends into the Harod Valley, where the 'Ain Jalut flows eastwards into the Jordan Valley.

== Etymology ==
For the Hebrew name several possible origins have been discussed. One is yoreh, lit. "shoots" or "teacher", a name used for a specific rain in the parasha Eikev (Deut. 11:14) and in the Twelve Minor Prophets (Joel 2:23), the first one of the annual rainy season in the Land of Israel. A second is "high place", as the hill does indeed dominate the surrounding valleys. A third is based on the meaning of "teacher" for the Hebrew moreh, interpreted as a local holy man who could foretell the future. One can also think of a holy man living on Givat HaMoreh who could bring about rain, or of a rainmaking cult once practiced at the site.

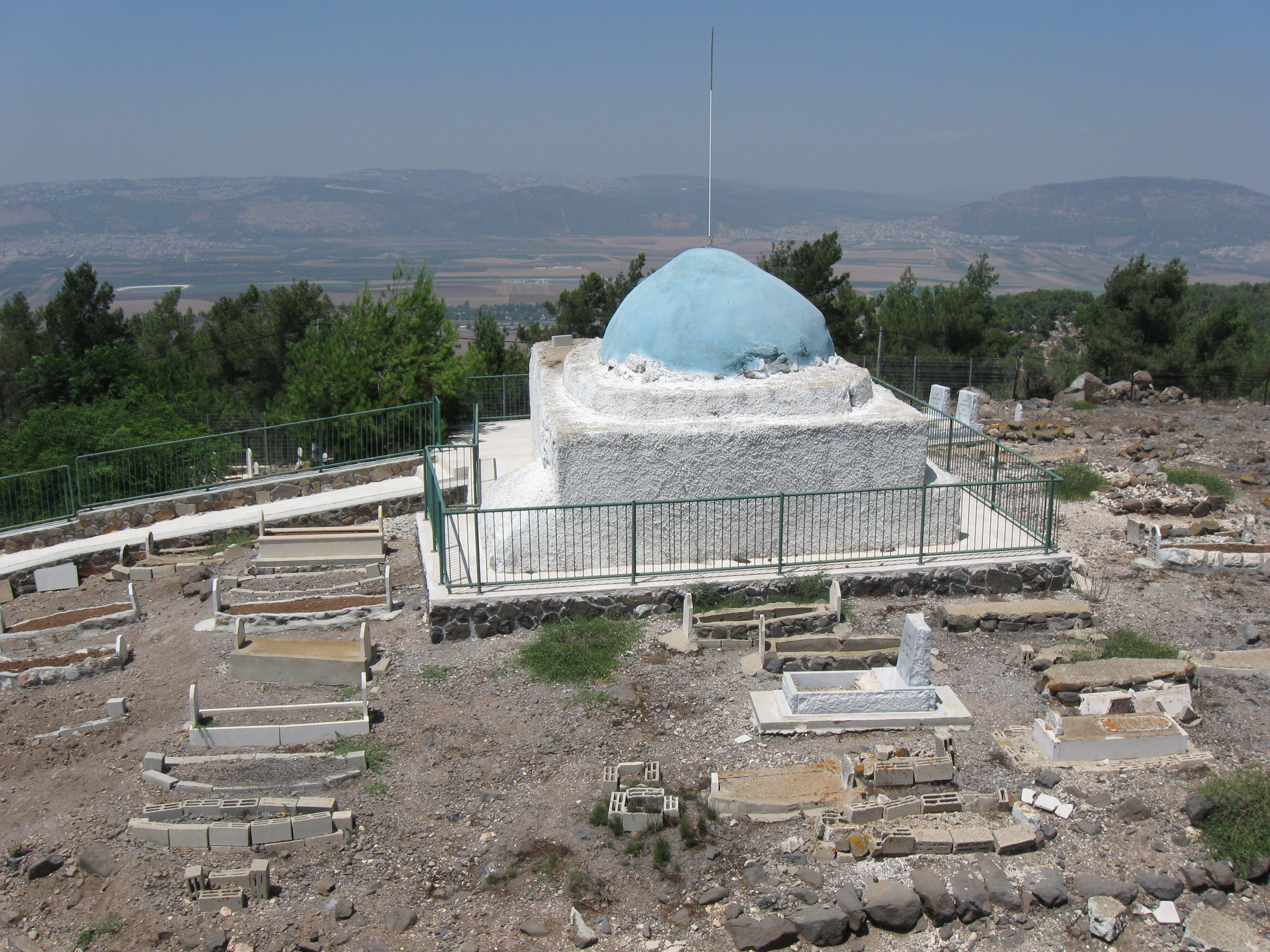
The Nebi Dahi maqam for the burial place of Dihyah al-Kalbi

In the 3rd century BCE, the name was translated into Koine Greek as Γαβααθ Αμωρα, "Gabaath Amora".

Christian pilgrims, starting with the Middle Ages, sometimes named the hill "Little Hermon" in connection to Psalm 89:13, "Tabor and Hermon shall rejoice in thy name", considering that Givat HaMore is close to Mount Tabor, much more so than Mount Hermon.

In Arabic, the hill is known as "Mount Dahi" (Jebel ed-Dahi), after the Muslim shrine (maqam) of Dihyah al-Kalbi situated at its top and housing the tomb of this seventh-century saint.

== History ==
=== Hebrew Bible ===
The "hill of Moreh" is mentioned in the Hebrew Bible three times, in Genesis 12:6, Deuteronomy 11:30 and Judges 7:1.

The Hebrew phrase elon moreh (Genesis 12:6a) has been subject to various translations in English versions of the Bible. Translators who consider elon moreh to be the name of a locality, render it as "the plain(s) of Moreh", e.g. King James Version and the Geneva Bible, but translators who consider the term to refer to a sacred tree or grove often render it as "terebinth" (Pistacia terebinthus), a tree which is notable for its size and age in dry landscapes of the region. For example, the New International Version translation of Genesis 12:6a reads:

"Abram traveled through the land as far as the site of the great tree of Moreh at Shechem"

and the New King James Version translates Deuteronomy 11:30 as:

"Are they (Mount Gerizim and Mount Ebal) not on the other side of the Jordan, toward the setting sun, in the land of the Canaanites who dwell in the plain opposite Gilgal, beside the terebinth trees of Moreh?"

"Moreh" is often understood to mean "teacher" or "oracle", referring to the owner of the tree or the land on which it grew.

Genesis 35:4:

"And they gave unto Jacob all the strange gods which [were] in their hand, and [all their] earrings which [were] in their ears; and Jacob hid them under the oak which [was] by Shechem."

A neutral reading discovers that the tree, oak or not, grew above buried idols and dedicated treasure, the Hebrews remembered, and they associated the burial of these things with the patriarchal age.

John Wesley noted that the plains of Moreh was one of the first places that Abram came to in Canaan, so when Moses sent the incoming Israelites to this place "to hear the blessing and the curse, they were minded of the promise made to Abram in that very place".

=== Ottoman period ===
A 19th-century travelogue identifies Moreh as Nebi Dahi, south of Mount Tabor.

=== British Mandate and State of Israel ===
In the 20th century, in the valley below the mountain, the city of Afula (est. 1925) was developed as the main Jewish center of the region. Afula gradually expanded from the plains to the slopes of Giv'at ha-Moreh. During the War of Independence in 1948, the area was completely dominated by Israeli forces, but local Arab population was not displaced. The Arab villages of Dahi and Nein are located on the slope.

On the central part of Giv'at ha-Moreh there is a nature reserve, partly wooded developed by the Jewish National Fund. The Nazareth Iris blooms here in spring.
