= Tamra =

Arab city in Israel

Tamra: טַמְרָה, תַמְרָה; طمرة
- City

Hebrew transcription(s)
  - ISO 259: Ṭámra, Támra
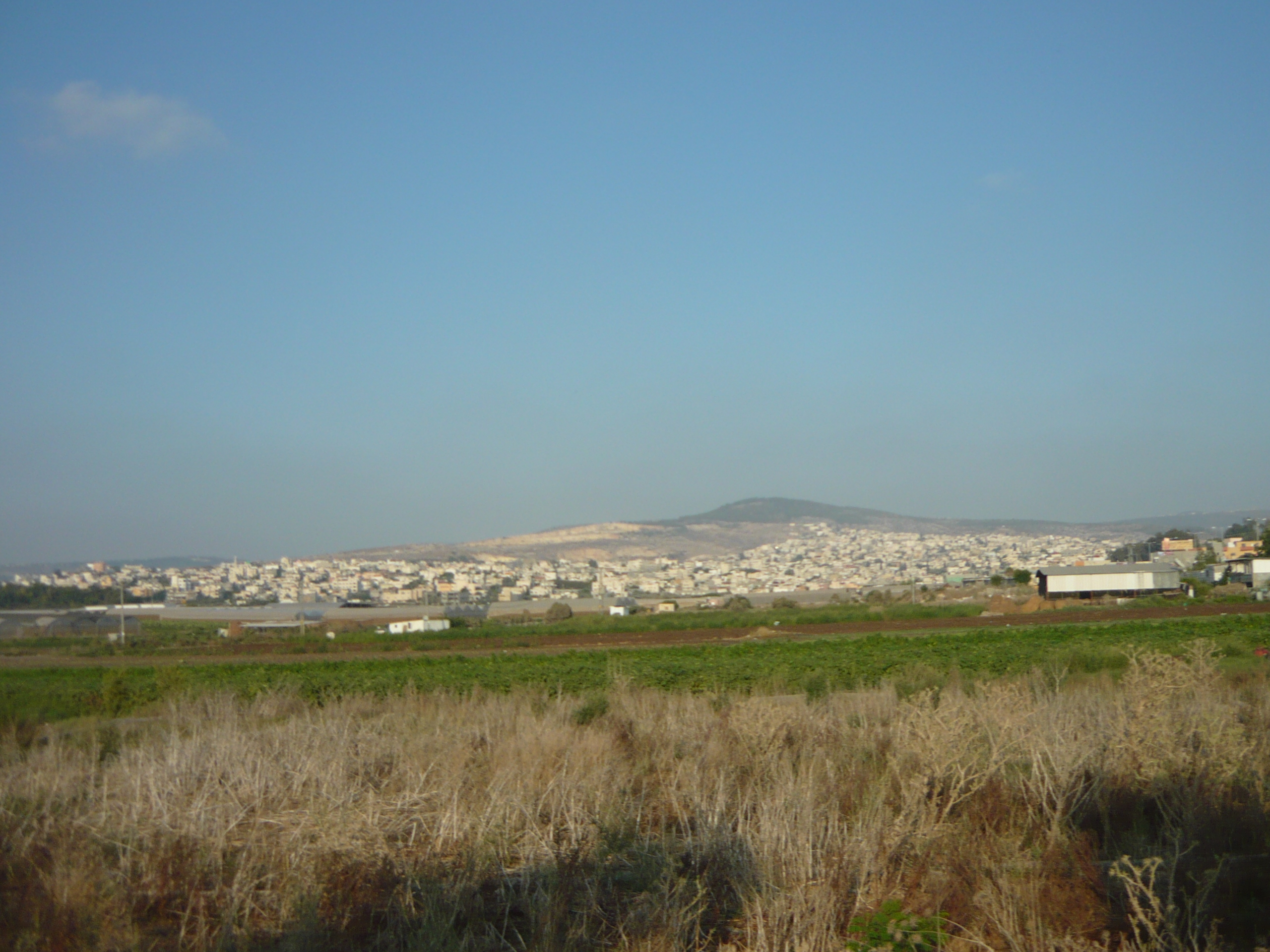
- View of Tamra

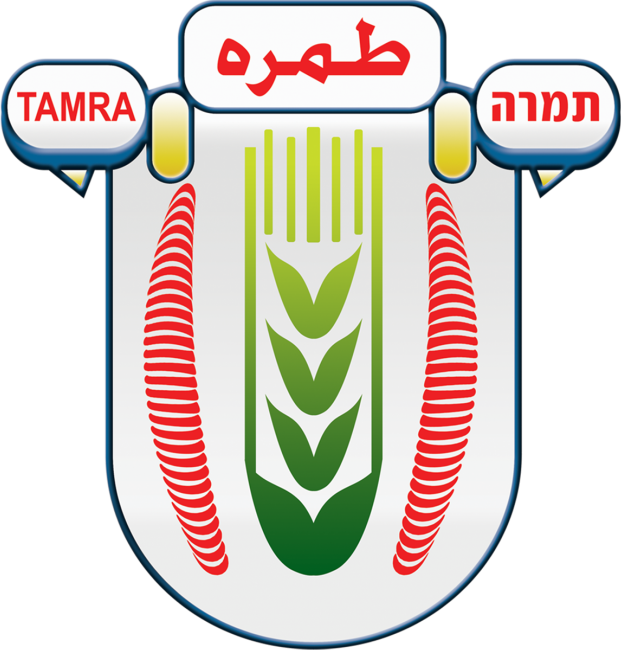

- Location within Northwest Israel Location within Israel
- Coordinates: 32°51′13″N 35°11′52″E
- Grid position: 169/250 PAL
- Country: Israel
- District: Northern
- Subdistrict: Acre
- Natural Region: Shefar'am
- City Status: 1996

Government
  - Mayor: Mussa Abu Rumi (Islamic movement) - since 2024

Area
  - Total: 29,259 dunams (29.259 km^{2}; 11.297 sq mi)

Population (2024)
  - Total: 36,918
  - Density: 1,261.8/km^{2} (3,268.0/sq mi)
- Name meaning: from make a pit for storing corn

Tamra (Arabic: طمرة, Hebrew: טַמְרָה or תַמְרָה) is an Arab city in the North District of Israel located in the Lower Galilee 5 kilometres (3 miles) north of the city of Shefa-Amr and approximately 20 kilometres (12 miles) east of Acre. In 2024 it had a population of 36,918.

As of May, 2025, the population was 36,832 people, of those 11,264 children, 2,470 senior citizens and 23,098 in the category of working age. The population is almost entirely Arab and Muslim.

== History ==
Tamra is an ancient village on a hill. Old squared stone blocks have been reused in village homes. Cisterns and tombs carved into rock have also been found here. Tamra has been identified with Kefar Tamartha, a Jewish village mentioned in the Talmud as the home of 3rd century amora Rabbi Shila of Kefar Tamarta.

On a hill 3 km west of Tamra's historical core lies a ruin called in Arabic Khirbet et-Tira ("ruin of the castle") and in Hebrew Horbat Tirat Tamra ("Tamra castle ruin"), which has been studied by European and Israeli archaeologists since the 19th century. The site is dated through its finds to the Persian, Hellenistic, Roman, Byzantine and Medieval periods. The site is bisected by Highway 70 and is covered the modern city's agricultural lands.

A church constructed in Tamra during the Byzantine era remained active through the Umayyad and Abbasid periods before it was finally abandoned. An inscription using the hijra calendar discovered on the church's floor can be dated to AD 725.

=== Crusader period ===
In the 1253, during the Crusader period, John Aleman, Lord of Caesarea, sold several villages, including Tamra, to the Hospitallers. In 1283 it was mentioned as part of the domain of the Crusaders, according to the hudna (temporary truce) between the Crusaders in Acre and the Mamluk sultan Qalawun.

Scholars have suggested that Khirbet et-Tira may be the site of Tatura, a Crusader period settlement belonging to the Templar order. The name of the ruin might be a corruption of the Arabic toponym "Turat Tamra", from the same period. Excavation at the site revealed remains of Crusader structures destroyed by fire in the 13th century.

=== Ottoman period ===
Tamra was incorporated into the Ottoman Empire in 1517. In the census of 1548–1549 or 1596 the village was located in the nahiya of Acre, part of Safed Sanjak. The population was 22 Muslim households. They paid a fixed tax rate of 20% on wheat, barley, fruit trees, cotton, occasional revenues, beehives and winter pastures; a total of 2,929 akçe.

In the early 18th century, Tamra was one of the three most important cotton-growing villages of the Galilee (alongside Shefa-Amr and I'billin). The village was controlled by Ali ibn Salih al-Zaydani (uncle of Daher al-Umar) in the 1700s. He sold its crop exclusively to an enterprising Dutch merchant, Paul Maashoek. The village was mentioned as 'Perè' by Richard Pococke during his visit of the area in 1737. He noted that it was built on a hill, at the foot of which was a well where the villagers used oxen to draw water; the women of the village would then carry the water in jars up the hill to water Tamra's tobacco fields. In 1799 it was named Tomrat on the map of Pierre Jacotin.

In 1859 the British Consul Rogers estimated the population to be 1,200, all Muslims, and the cultivated area 80 feddans, while Victor Guérin found it in 1875 to have 800 inhabitants, all Muslim. In 1881, the PEF's Survey of Western Palestine (SWP) described Tamra as: "A large village, with a small mosque on the east and well on the north. There is a rock-cut tomb west of the houses. South of the village, in the valley, a fine olive-grove extends as far as er Rueis." A population list from about 1887 showed that Tamra had about 535 inhabitants, all Muslims.

=== British Mandate ===
At the time of the 1922 census of Palestine Tamra had a population of 1,111, all Muslims, increasing in the 1931 census to 1,258, all Muslims, in a total of 282 houses.

In the 1945 statistics, Tamra had 1,830 inhabitants, all Muslims, while the total jurisdiction of the village was 30,559 dunams of land. 1,564 dunams were used for plantations and irrigable land, 14,434 dunams for cereals, while 206 dunams were built-up (urban) land.

=== State of Israel ===
Tamra was captured by Israeli forces from the Arab Liberation Army and the Syrian Army in 1948 Arab–Israeli War as a part of Operation Dekel. On 20 May 1948 the civilian population had been evacuated on orders from Arab irregular forces. According to Benny Morris, they feared that the village would surrender to the Yishuv. The city grew rapidly in the period of Israel's first years as a nation due to the influx of Palestinian refugees from destroyed nearby villages such as al-Birwa or al-Damun. Large percentages of the city's farming land was expropriated by Israeli authorities and allocated to farming cooperatives and nearby Jewish settlement towns such as Mitzpe Aviv. Tamra achieved local council status in 1956 and was declared a city in 1996. In 2020 the Israeli government approved plans to construct 5,270 housing units in the southern quarter. The plan includes public and transport infrastructure.

On 14 June 2025, during an Iranian missile attack on Israel, a ballistic missile directly struck a house in Tamra, killing four people, including a mother, her two daughters, and another relative, and injuring 20 others. Asaf Cohen, an ex-officer of the Israeli Military Intelligence, commented shortly afterward that the Iranian strike was an obvious error, with Iran having aimed at an important target nearby, which he did not name explicitly. After the strike, a video surfaced online showing Israelis celebrating the attack with anti-Arab chants like "On the village, on the village" and "May your village burn," which was often sung by ultranationalist Jews. President Isaac Herzog described it as "appalling and disgraceful".

Mayor of Tamra, Mussa Abu Rumi commented that that lack of public underground shelter was due to lack of investment in Arab localities by the Israeli government. The strike raised concerns about the long-standing inequalities in lack of protective infrastructures in Arab communities compared to Jewish ones from lack of adequate investment from the government in addressing these gaps.

== Demographics ==
Historical population
Year	Pop.	±%
1972	8,600	—
1983	13,500	+57.0%
1995	19,000	+40.7%
2008	28,100	+47.9%
2022	35,349	+25.8%
2024	36,919	+4.4%

According to the Israel Central Bureau of Statistics (CBS), at the end of 2007 the city had a total population of 27,300. In 2001, the ethnic makeup of the city was almost entirely Arab (99.6% Muslim), with no significant Jewish population. In 2022, 99.9% of the population was Muslim and 0.1% was Christian.

According to CBS, in 2001 there were 11,900 males and 11,400 females. The population of the city was spread out, with 48.5% 19 years of age or younger, 18.0% between 20 and 29, 19.7% between 30 and 44, 9.0% from 45 to 59, 1.6% from 60 to 64, and 3.0% 65 years of age or older. The population growth rate in 2001 was 3.3% and by 2005 had dropped to 2.5%.

The largest and most influential clan in Tamra is the Diab, which consists of several branches. Other clans include the Hejazi, and the smaller clans of Abd al-Hadi, Abu Na'ama, Abu Rumi, Amar, Arshid, Awwad, Kanaan, Muhsin, Nasser, Natour, Ourabi, Radi, Shama, Shaqir, Sheikh Ali and Yassin. In addition to the aforementioned clans, whose presence in Tamra predates the state of Israel, the city is home to internally displaced Palestinians and their descendants from the nearby villages of al-Damun, Hadatha, Mi'ar and al-Ruways, which were depopulated during the 1948 Arab–Israeli War.

== Income ==
According to CBS, there were 3,908 salaried workers and 375 self-employed persons in 2000.

== Education ==
According to CBS, there are 13 schools and 5,779 students in the city. They are spread out as 9 elementary schools and 4000 elementary school students, and 3 high schools and 2,324 high school students. 54.6% of 12th grade students were entitled to a matriculation certificate in 2001.

During the late 1990s sociologist As'ad Ghanem set up an NGO in Tamra. It was called Ibn Khaldun and campaigned for more Arab history to be taught in Israeli schools.

== Sports ==
The current football teams in the city are Maccabi Tamra and F.C. Tzeirei Tamra, both play in Liga Gimel, the fifth tier of Israeli football. Maccabi Tamra and Hapoel Bnei Tamra (which is now defunct), played in the past in Liga Artzit, having been promoted from Liga Alef in 1988 and 2006 respectively.

== Voting Patterns ==
In the 2022 election, 95 percent of voters in Tamra voted for the Arab parties, while 4 percent voted for the parties of the center-left coalition led by Yair Lapid and 1 percent voted for the parties of the right-wing coalition led by Benjamin Netanyahu. Among the voters for the Arab parties, 38 percent voted for Ra'am, while 36 percent voted for the Hadash–Ta'al list and 26 percent voted for Balad.

In the 2026 election, 97 percent of voters in Tamra voted for the Arab parties, while 2 percent voted for the parties of the center-left coalition led by Gadi Eisenkot and 0.3 percent voted for the parties of the right-wing coalition led by Benjamin Netanyahu. Among the voters for the Arab parties, 63 percent voted for the Joint List, while 37 percent voted for Ra'am. Voter turnout increased 45 percent from the 2022 election.

== Notable people ==
- Mohammed Awaed (born 1997), football player for Maccabi Haifa
- Yussef Diab (1917–1984), member of the Knesset

== See also ==
- Arab localities in Israel

== Bibliography ==
- Barag, Dan (1979). "A new source concerning the ultimate borders of the Latin Kingdom of Jerusalem". Israel Exploration Journal. 29: 197–217.
- Barron, J.B., ed. (1923). Palestine: Report and General Abstracts of the Census of 1922. Government of Palestine.
- Clermont-Ganneau, C.S. (1888). Recueil d'archéologie orientale (in French). Vol. 1. Paris.
- Cohen, Amnon (1973). Palestine in the 18th Century: Patterns of Government and Administration. Jerusalem: The Magnes Press. ISBN 978-0-19-647903-3.
- Conder, C.R.; Kitchener, H.H. (1881). The Survey of Western Palestine: Memoirs of the Topography, Orography, Hydrography, and Archaeology. Vol. 1. London: Committee of the Palestine Exploration Fund.
- Dauphin, C. (1998). La Palestine byzantine, Peuplement et Populations. BAR International Series 726 (in French). Vol. III : Catalogue. Oxford: Archeopress. ISBN 0-860549-05-4.
- Delaville Le Roulx, J. (1883). Les archives, la bibliothèque et le trésor de l'Ordre de Saint-Jean de Jérusalem à Malte (in French and Latin). Paris: E. Leroux.
- Department of Statistics (1945). Village Statistics, April, 1945. Government of Palestine.
- Guérin, V. (1880). Description Géographique Historique et Archéologique de la Palestine (in French). Vol. 3: Galilee, pt. 1. Paris: L'Imprimerie Nationale.
- Hadawi, S. (1970). Village Statistics of 1945: A Classification of Land and Area ownership in Palestine. Palestine Liberation Organization Research Center.
- Hütteroth, W.-D.; Abdulfattah, K. (1977). Historical Geography of Palestine, Transjordan and Southern Syria in the Late 16th Century. Erlanger Geographische Arbeiten, Sonderband 5. Erlangen: Fränkische Geographische Gesellschaft. ISBN 3-920405-41-2.
- Karmon, Y. (1960). "An Analysis of Jacotin's Map of Palestine" (PDF). Israel Exploration Journal. 10 (3, 4): 155–173, 244–253. Archived from the original (PDF) on 2019-12-22.
- Mills, E., ed. (1932). Census of Palestine 1931. Population of Villages, Towns and Administrative Areas. Jerusalem: Government of Palestine.
- Morris, B. (1987). The Birth of the Palestinian refugee problem, 1947-1949. Cambridge University Press. ISBN 0-521-33028-9.
- Palmer, E.H. (1881). The Survey of Western Palestine: Arabic and English Name Lists Collected During the Survey by Lieutenants Conder and Kitchener, R. E. Transliterated and Explained by E.H. Palmer. Committee of the Palestine Exploration Fund.
- Pappé, I. (2011). The Forgotten Palestinians. A History of the Palestinians in Israel. Yale. ISBN 978-0-300-13441-4.
- Pococke, R. (1745). A Description of the East, and some Other Countries. Vol. 2. London: Printed for the author, by W. Bowyer.
- Rosenfeld, Henry; Al-Haj, Majid (1990). Arab Local Government in Israel. Westview Press. ISBN 0-8133-7761-7.
- Rhode, H. (1979). Administration and Population of the Sancak of Safed in the Sixteenth Century. Columbia University. Archived from the original on 2020-03-01.
- Röhricht, R. (1893). (RRH) Regesta regni Hierosolymitani (MXCVII-MCCXCI) (in Latin). Berlin: Libraria Academica Wageriana.
- Schumacher, G. (1888). "Population list of the Liwa of Akka". Quarterly Statement - Palestine Exploration Fund. 20: 169–191.
