= Al-Birwa =

Former Palestinian village

Al-Birwa البروة Al-Birweh
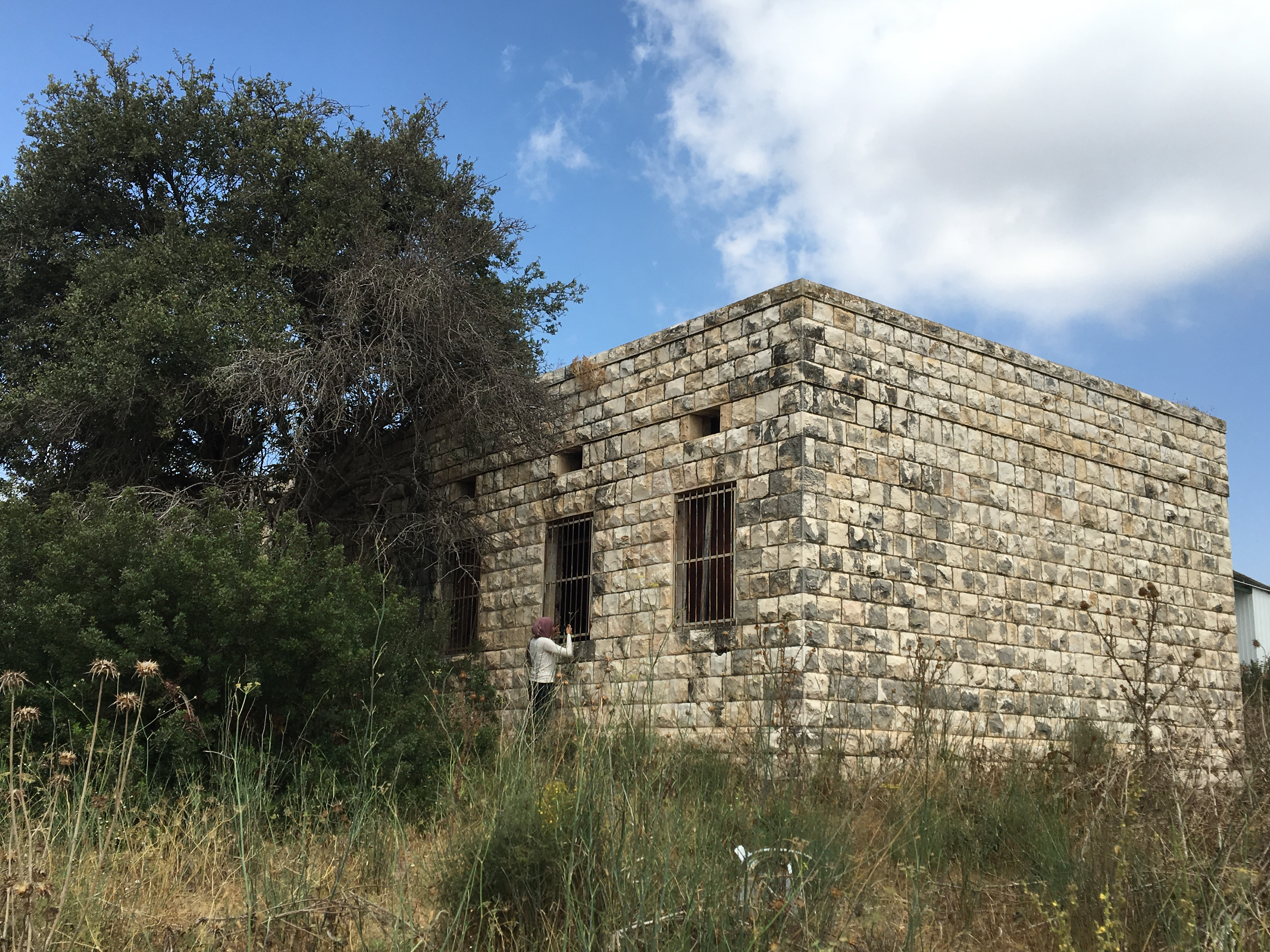
- The former school in al-Birwa, 2019

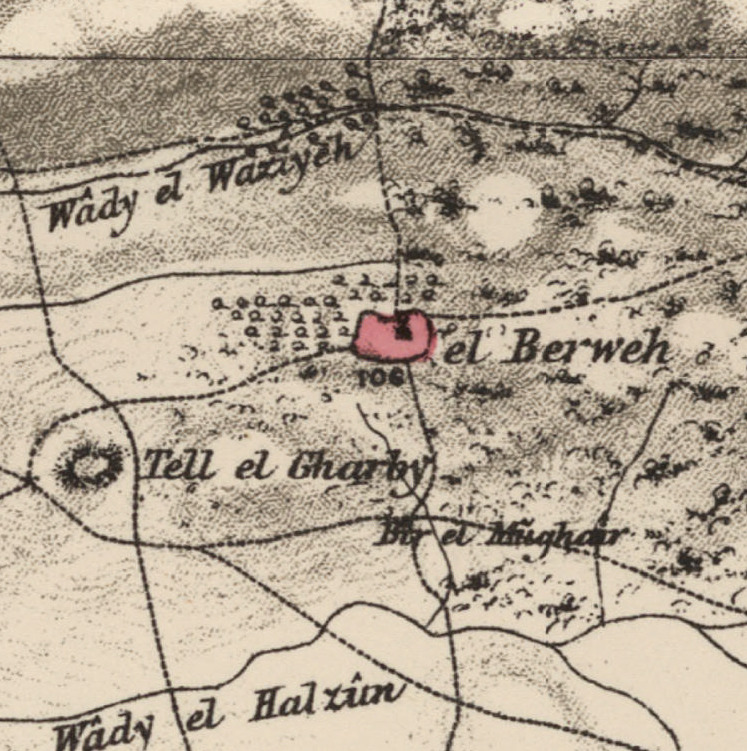
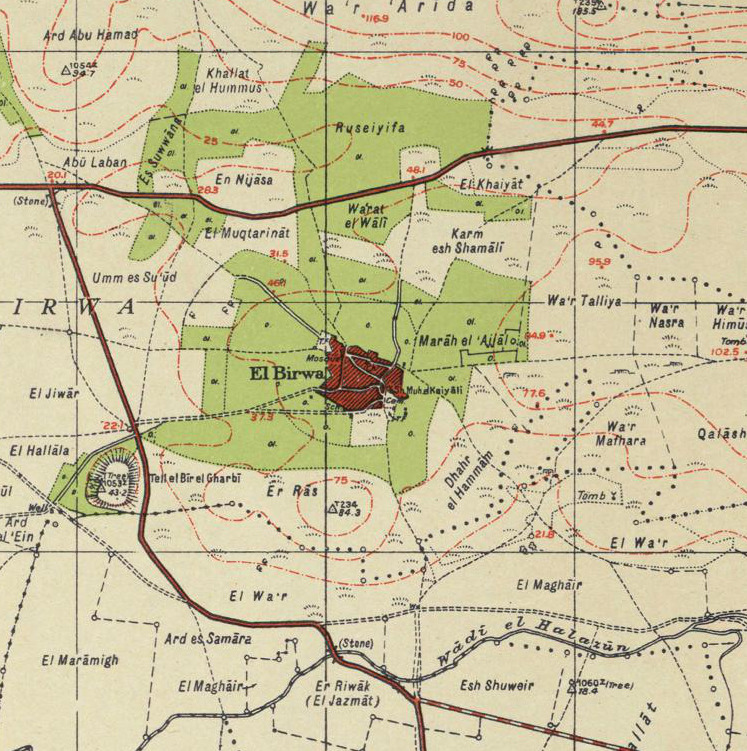
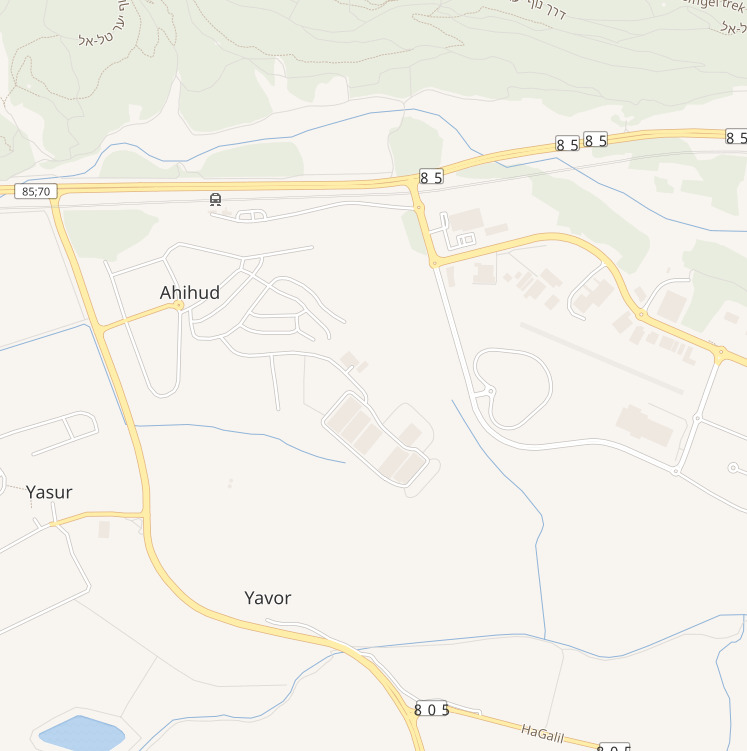
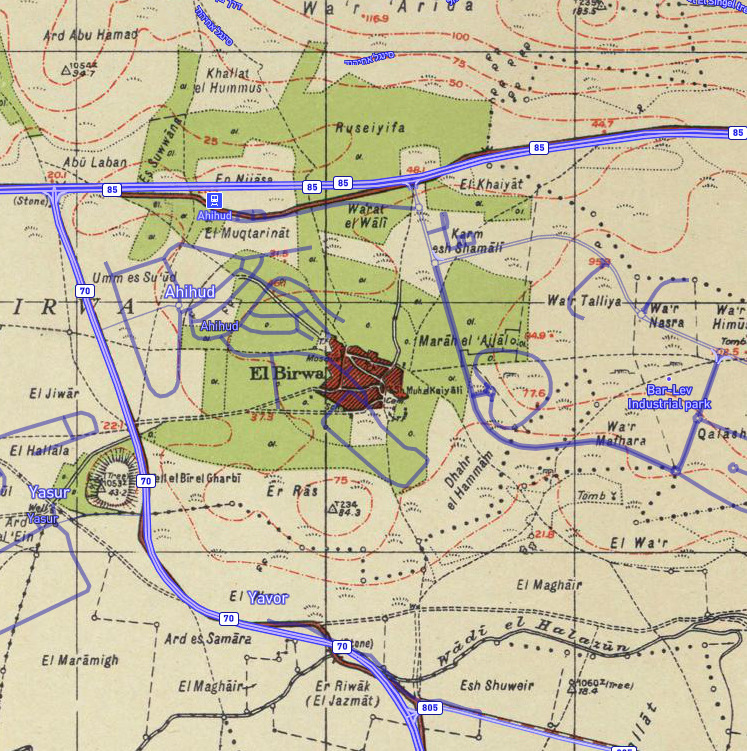
- 1870s map 1940s map modern map 1940s with modern overlay map A series of historical maps of the area around Al-Birwa (click the buttons)

- Location within Mandatory Palestine
- Coordinates: 32°54′19″N 35°10′49″E
- Palestine grid: 167/257
- Geopolitical entity: Mandatory Palestine
- Subdistrict: Acre
- Date of depopulation: 11 June 1948 or mid-July

Area
  - Total: 13.5 km^{2} (5.2 sq mi)

Population (1945)
  - Total: 1,460
- Cause(s) of depopulation: Military assault by Yishuv forces
- Current localities: Ahihud, Yas'ur

Al-Birwa (Arabic: البروة, also spelled al-Birweh) was a Palestinian Arab village, located 10.5 kilometers (6.5 mi) east of Acre (Akka). In 1945, it had a population of 1,460, of whom the majority were Muslims and a significant minority, Christians. Its total land area consisted of 13,542 dunams (13.5 square kilometers). The village was depopulated during the 1948 Arab–Israeli War.

The settlement at Al-Birwa was started in the Roman era, and reached a peak in the Byzantine era. In the mid-11th century CE Al-Birwa was mentioned by the Persian geographer Nasir Khusraw and it was known to the Crusaders as "Broet". The village came under Mamluk rule in the late 13th century, and in the early 16th century, it was conquered by the Ottomans, who ruled it for four centuries. Travelers' reports from the late 19th century documented that al-Birwa had a mosque, a church and an elementary school for boys (a girls' school was built in 1942).

During British Mandate rule in Palestine, al-Birwa was home to local power brokers, who mediated disputes in neighboring villages. Al-Birwa became a center of rebel operations during the 1936–1939 revolt against British rule. By the 1940s, many of the village's agrarian inhabitants lost their lands due to debt, and shifted to labor jobs in nearby cities, such as Haifa. However, the majority of the residents—men and women—continued to engage in farming, selling their olives, grains and other crops in the markets of Acre. Al-Birwa was captured by the Israelis in early June 1948, after which its local militia recaptured the village. Al-Birwa was then permanently occupied by the Israelis in late June. Afterward, its inhabitants, including future Palestinian poet Mahmoud Darwish, fled to nearby villages or Lebanon. The Jewish communities of Yas'ur and Ahihud were established on al-Birwa's lands in 1949 and 1950, respectively.

== Geography ==
Al-Birwa stood on a rocky hill overlooking the plain of Acre, with an average elevation of 60 meters above sea level. It was situated at the intersection of two highways—one led to Acre and the other towards Haifa. Located 10.5 kilometers east of Acre, the other nearest localities to al-Birwa included al-Damun (depopulated in 1948) to the south, and the Arab towns of Jadeidi to the northwest, Julis to the north, Sha'ab to the east, and Majd al-Kurum to the northeast.

Al-Birwa's total land area consisted of 13,542 dunams (13.42 hectares), of which 59 dunams were built-up areas. Cultivable land accounted for 77% of the total land area. Orchards were planted on 1,548 dunams of which 1,500 were used for olive groves, and 8,457 dunams were allotted to grains. The residents of the town sold 536 dunams to Jews, and most of the rest was Arab-owned.

=== Archaeology ===
Several excavation has been conducted at the site of al-Birwa after year 2000. Finds included a large building, numerous potsherds from the Late Roman period, a bronze coin from the 1st or 2nd century CE, remains of an ancient olive press, glass vessels such as a wine goblet and bottles dated to the Late Byzantine and Umayyad periods (7th and first half of 8th centuries CE) and an underground water reservoir. A few potsherds from the Crusader and Mamluk periods were also found.

In 2008, the remains of a large olive oil refinery dating from the Byzantine era was uncovered, together with items belonging to a church. The excavators believed that the olive press could be situated inside a Byzantine monastery.

== History ==
=== Antiquity ===
The more ancient site, Tel Birwa (variant: Tel Berweh), lies about one mile southwest of the Arab village by the same name, and is said to be a mound measuring 600 paces in circumference at the top, and 75 feet high. The mound abounds with Graeco-Roman potsherds, showing that it was occupied down to Roman times when it was abandoned, as no distinctively Arab pottery could be found there. Conder and Kitchener thought that Al-Birwa preserves in its name the more ancient name of Beri (Hebrew: בירי), mentioned in the Jerusalem Talmud (Pesahim iv.1 [26a]), seeing that both it and Kabul are mentioned together. According to Josephus, the villages in the immediate vicinity of Kabul were pillaged and burnt during the First Jewish revolt against Rome.

=== Middle Ages ===
Al-Birwa was mentioned in 1047 CE, during Fatimid rule, when it was visited by the Persian geographer, Nasir Khusraw. He describes it as lying "between Acre and Damun", and reports having visited what he described as the tombs of Simeon and Esau there. The Crusaders wrested control of Palestine from the Fatimids in 1099. They referred to al-Birwa as "Broet". In 1253, John Aleman, the Crusader lord of Caesarea, sold al-Birwa, along with several other villages, to the Knights Hospitaller. Al-Birwa was mentioned as part of the Acre-based Crusaders' domain in the 1283 hudna (truce agreement) with the Mamluks under Sultan al-Mansur Qalawun. In the late 13th century, the Mamluks defeated and conquered the last Crusader outposts along Palestine's northern coastline.

=== Ottoman Empire ===
Al-Birwa came under Ottoman rule in 1517, along with all of Palestine. In 1596, al-Birwa was a small village in the Akka Nahiya (Subdistrict of Acre), part of the Safad Sanjak (District of Safed). The village paid taxes on wheat, barley, fruit, beehives, and goats. According to Ottoman tax registers, al-Birwa had 121 residents in 1596.

The village is mentioned as 'Berroe' by Richard Pococke during his visit to the area in 1737. In 1761, when the Galilee was dominated by Daher al-Umar, Giovanni Mariti visited the area and noted that Birwa and Kabul (which he called 'Benadie' and 'Tabul') lied in a "well cultivated" valley abundant in crops. A map from Napoleon's invasion of 1799 by French cartographer Pierre Jacotin depicted al-Birwa as "Beroweh", though its location on the map was misplaced.

In the late 19th century, al-Birwa grew to be a large village, with a well in its southern area. (Note: Conder & Kitchener (1881), page 270, cited in Khalidi, 1992, p. 9.) To the north lay "beautiful olive-groves and fruitful wheatfields," as they were described by one Western traveller to the region in the mid-19th century. American biblical scholar Edward Robinson visited al-Birwa in 1852 and noted that it was one of 18 villages in Palestine with an operating Christian (Eastern Orthodox) church. By 1859, British Consul Edward T. Rogers recorded that al-Birwa had approximately 900 inhabitants. The French explorer, Victor Guérin, who visited in 1875, described the Christians of Birwa as Greek Orthodox, and noted that they had a "fairly new" church.

A population list from about 1887 showed that al-Birwa had about 755 inhabitant, of whom 650 were Muslims and 105 were Christians. In 1888, the Ottomans built an elementary school for boys.

=== British Mandate ===
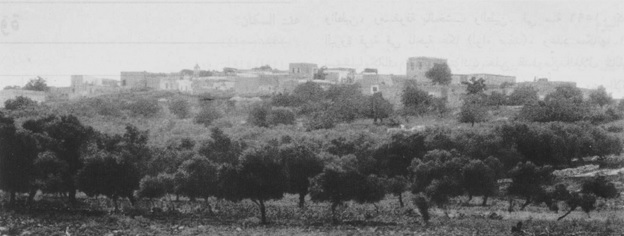
Al-Birwa from a distance, 1928

In 1917, during World War I, British forces drove out the Ottomans from Palestine and in 1920, the British Mandate of Palestine was established. In the 1922 British census, al-Birwa had a population of 807, consisting of 735 Muslims and 72 Christians. The Christians were mostly Orthodox with five Anglicans. By the 1931 census, the population had increased to 996, of which 884 were Muslims and 92 were Christians, living in a total of 224 houses. Cement roofs became widely used in al-Birwa in the 1930s, during a time of significant expansion in the village.

A number of al-Birwa's inhabitants participated in the 1936–1939 Arab revolt against British rule and mass Jewish immigration in Palestine. A commander of the revolt for the Nazareth-Tiberias region, Sheikh Yihya Hawash, was from al-Birwa. He was arrested by the British and sentenced to life imprisonment. The British also executed eight residents of al-Birwa who had participated in the revolt. Other rebel commanders and participants in the revolt from al-Birwa included Asad Atallah, Mahmoud al-Joudi, Saleh Mahmoud Me'ari-Abu Sa'ud, Abd al-Hamid Daher Me'ari, Muhammad al-Hajj Ali, Yusef Taha, Fadil Eid, Yousif Mai and Abbas al-Shattawi. A number of women from al-Birwa participated in the revolt by transporting arms, water and food to rebels positioned among the hills in the vicinity. Elderly refugees from al-Birwa interviewed in 2003–2004 recalled that during the revolt, local rebels set off a mine that hit a British military jeep on a road adjacent to al-Birwa in August 1937, prompting the British to launch punitive measures against the village. These included gathering men from al-Birwa and forcing them to cut cactus plants near Acre and then placing the men on top of the cactuses, leaving the women of the village to tend to their wounds.

In the 1945 statistics, al-Birwa's population was 1,460, of which 130 were Christians. Prominent families and landowners in the village included the Saad, Darwish, Abdullah, Kayyal, Sakkas, al-Wakid, al-Joudi, Najm, al-Dabdoub, Khalid, Akawi, Hissian, Hawash and al-Sheikha families. Socio-economic status in the village was largely determined by land ownership. About 140 residents of the village were tenant farmers who worked for the major landowning Moughrabi, al-Zayyat and Adlabi families. According to intelligence gathered by the Haganah (a Jewish paramilitary organization in Palestine), the traditional, local power brokers of the central Galilee were residents of al-Birwa, who "resolved all conflicts in the nearby villages". Haganah intelligence also reported that al-Birwa's inhabitants were "long-lived, the majority reaching an age of over 100 years".

By the 1940s, al-Birwa had three olive oil presses, a mosque, a church, and approximately 300 houses. In addition to the Ottoman-era boys' school, an elementary school for girls was established in 1943. By this time, many of the inhabitants lost all or part of their lands due to debts, and concurrently, men and women from al-Birwa increasingly worked in public projects, such as road construction and the Haifa oil refinery, or in British military installations, to compensate for lost income. However, the main source of income remained agriculture, and the village's principal crops were olives, wheat, barley, corn, sesame, and watermelons. In 1944–45, residents of the village owned a total of 600 cattle, 3,000 goats and 1,000 chickens. Women, particularly young women from smaller landowning families, participated alongside the men of their family in working the land, while many women from landless families drew income as seasonal workers on other village residents' lands. There were general, gender-based divisions of labor, with women collecting well water, raising livestock, curdling milk, transporting goods to markets in Acre and collecting herbs; men typically plowed and sowed seeds, and both men and women picked olives and harvested crops.

=== Israel ===
Israeli forces from the Carmeli Brigade first captured al-Birwa and positions overlooking it on 11 June 1948 as part of Operation Ben-Ami, a day before the first truce of the 1948 Arab-Israeli War. During the fighting, 45 elderly residents hid in the church with the priest. The defenders of the village surrendered after losing men and running out of ammunition. The residents took refuge in nearby villages for thirteen days. Nevertheless, clashes continued during the truce. According to local militiamen from al-Birwa, 96 men from the village armed with rifles, and an equal number of men armed with non-firearms and unarmed women assembled near the front lines of the Arab Liberation Army (ALA). The rifle-armed force charged first across the front lines, followed by the men armed with axes, shovels, and sticks, and then the women who carried water to assist the wounded. Al-Birwa's ad hoc militia took the small force of Haganah soldiers (who became part of the Israel Defense Forces on 26 May) by surprise and forced them back a kilometer west of al-Birwa. Afterward, al-Birwa's residents harvested their crops. They remained in the village until 24 June, when ALA commanders suggested that they join their families in the nearby villages. The militiamen claimed that the ALA stood by during the clashes because they did not receive orders from their superiors.

The Israelis announced that they had battled ALA units in the area, inflicting 100 casualties on 25 June. The New York Times reported that there was fighting in the village for two days and that United Nations (UN) observers were there investigating truce violations. It added that "a small Israeli garrison held al-Birwa prior to the [first] truce", but it fell to ALA troops based in Nazareth who launched a surprise attack. Some residents camped in the outskirts of the village and occasionally managed to enter and gather personal belongings. After the end of the first truce in mid-July, al-Birwa was captured by Israel during Operation Dekel. The ALA fought the Israelis to recapture al-Birwa, but by 18 July, the village was firmly behind Israeli lines.

On 20 August 1948, the Jewish National Fund called for building a settlement on some of al-Birwa's lands, and on 6 January 1949, Yas'ur, a kibbutz, was established there. In 1950, the moshav of Ahihud was inaugurated on the village's western lands. According to Palestinian historian Walid Khalidi, one of al-Birwa's schools, two shrines for local sages, and three houses remained standing as of 1982. One of the shrines was domed and built of stone. Most of the structures stood amid cacti, weeds, olive and fig groves, and mulberry trees. Most of al-Birwa's inhabitants fled to nearby Arab towns and villages, including Tamra, Kabul, Jadeidi, Kafr Yasif, and other localities. In Jadeidi the refugees of al-Birwa mostly resided in a neighborhood called al-Barawneh after their village of origin or alternatively al-Kayyali after the Kayyal family, many of whom lived in the neighborhood and one of whom, Afif Kayyal, was elected mayor in the 1990s and in 2003. Some fled to Lebanon, and ended up in the Shatila refugee camp, in the outskirts of Beirut, where Palestinian historian Nafez Nazzal interviewed them in 1973. Among the refugees of al-Birwa was Mahmoud Darwish, who was born in the village in 1941 and lived part of his childhood there.

In 1950, Tawfik Toubi, an Arab member of the Knesset, raised the issue of the internally displaced refugees of al-Birwa in the Knesset, demanding that they be allowed to return to their homes. Prime Minister David Ben-Gurion replied in the negative, stating, "The questioner presented the facts inaccurately. Birwa is an abandoned village which was destroyed in the fighting. Its inhabitants cooperated with Kaukji's gangs. The Israel Defense Forces and the government did not treat them as they deserved, but permitted them to remain in villages near Birwa, and to become residents of Israel. The government of Israel treats them as it does the other residents of Israel and those lacking means of subsistence. A special body was established to deal with these refugees, to resettle and rehabilitate them, not necessarily in their former villages, and the resettlement of the refugees in Nazareth has already begun." In December 1951, the village site was declared a closed military zone.

Al-Birwa is among the Palestinian villages for which commemorative Marches of Return have taken place, typically as part of Nakba Day, such as the demonstrations organized by the Association for the Defense of the Rights of the Internally Displaced.

== See also ==
- Depopulated Palestinian locations in Israel

== Sources ==
- Abu Raya, Rafeh (28 May 2020). "Ahihud (East)". Hadashot Arkheologiyot – Excavations and Surveys in Israel (132).
- Albright, W.F. (1922). "Contribution to the Historical Geography of Palestine". Annual of the American Schools of Oriental Research. 2–3: 1–46.
- Barag, Dan (1979). "A new source concerning the ultimate borders of the Latin Kingdom of Jerusalem". Israel Exploration Journal. 29 (3/4): 197–217. JSTOR 27925726.
- Barron, J. B., ed. (1923). Palestine: Report and General Abstracts of the Census of 1922. Government of Palestine.
- Benvenisti, M. (2000). Sacred Landscape: The Buried History of the Holy Land Since 1948. Maxine Kaufman-Lacusta (translator). University of California Press. ISBN 978-0-520-21154-4.
- Boqa'i, Nihad (2005). "Patterns of Internal Displacement, Social Adjustment and the Challenge of Return". In Masalha, Nur (ed.). Catastrophe Remembered: Palestine, Israel and the Internal Refugees. New York: Zed Books. pp. 73–112. ISBN 1-84277-622-3.
- Clermont-Ganneau, C.S. (1888). Recueil d'archéologie orientale (in French). Vol. 1. Paris.
- Conder, C.R.; Kitchener, H.H. (1881). The Survey of Western Palestine: Memoirs of the Topography, Orography, Hydrography, and Archaeology. Vol. 1. London: Committee of the Palestine Exploration Fund.
- Delaville Le Roulx, J. (1883). Les archives, la bibliothèque et le trésor de l'Ordre de Saint-Jean de Jérusalem à Malte (in French and Latin). Paris: E. Leroux.
- Department of Statistics (1945). Village Statistics, April, 1945. Government of Palestine.
- Guérin, V. (1880). Description Géographique Historique et Archéologique de la Palestine (in French). Vol. 3: Galilee, pt. 1. Paris: L'Imprimerie Nationale.
- Hadawi, S. (1970). Village Statistics of 1945: A Classification of Land and Area ownership in Palestine. Palestine Liberation Organization Research Center. Archived from the original on 8 December 2018.
- Holt, Peter Malcolm (1986). The Age of the Crusades: The Near East from the Eleventh Century to 151. Addison Wesley Longman Limited. p. 103. ISBN 9781317871521.
- Hütteroth, W.-D.; Abdulfattah, K. (1977). Historical Geography of Palestine, Transjordan and Southern Syria in the Late 16th Century. Erlanger Geographische Arbeiten, Sonderband 5. Erlangen, Germany: Vorstand der Fränkischen Geographischen Gesellschaft. ISBN 978-3-920405-41-4.
- Josephus (1961). The Jewish War. Vol. 2. Translated by H. St. J. Thackeray. London: Loeb Classical Library (Books I-III).
- Kacowicz, Arie Marcelo; Lutomski, Pawel (2007). Population Resettlement in International Conflicts: A Comparative Study. Lanham, Maryland: Lexington Books. ISBN 978-0-7391-1607-4.
- Karmon, Y. (1960). "An Analysis of Jacotin's Map of Palestine" (PDF). Israel Exploration Journal. 10 (3–4): 155–173, 244–253. Archived from the original (PDF) on 22 December 2019.
- Khalidi, W. (1992). All That Remains: The Palestinian Villages Occupied and Depopulated by Israel in 1948. Washington D.C.: Institute for Palestine Studies. ISBN 978-0-88728-224-9.
- Le Strange, G. (1890). Palestine Under the Moslems: A Description of Syria and the Holy Land from A.D. 650 to 1500. Committee of the Palestine Exploration Fund.
- Mariti, G. (1792). Travels Through Cyprus, Syria, and Palestine; with a General History of the Levant. Vol. 1. Dublin: P. Byrne.
- Mills, E. (1932). Census of Palestine 1931. Population of Villages, Towns and Administrative Areas (PDF). Jerusalem: Government of Palestine.
- Meari, Lena (2010). Kanaaneh, Rhoda Ann; Nusair, Isis (eds.). The Roles of Palestinian Peasant Women: The Case of al-Birweh Village, 1930–1960. State University of New York Press. ISBN 978-1-4384-3271-7.
- Morris, B. (2004). The Birth of the Palestinian Refugee Problem Revisited. Cambridge University Press. ISBN 978-0-521-00967-6.
- Nazzal, Nafez (1978). The Palestinian Exodus from Galilee 1948. Beirut: The Institute for Palestine Studies. ISBN 9780887281280.
- Pococke, R. (1745). A Description of the East, and some Other Countries. Vol. 2. London: Printed for the author, by W. Bowyer.
- Porat, Leea; Getzov, Nimrod (7 February 2010). "Ahihud". Israel Antiquities Authority.
- Robinson, E. (1856). Later biblical researches in Palestine, and in the adjacent regions: A journal of travels in the year 1852. Drawn up from the original diaries, with historical illustrations, with new maps and plans. University of Michigan. ISBN 9780837002514.
- Röhricht, R. (1893). (RRH) Regesta regni Hierosolymitani (MXCVII-MCCXCI) (in Latin). Berlin: Libraria Academica Wageriana.
- Schumacher, G. (1888). "Population list of the Liwa of Akka". Quarterly Statement - Palestine Exploration Fund. 20: 169–191.
- Torstrick, Rebecca L. (30 June 2004). Culture and Customs of Israel (1 ed.). Westport, Conn: ABC-CLIO, Greenwood Press. p. 64. ISBN 978-0313320910.
- Velde, van de, C.W.M. (1858). Memoir to Accompany the Map of the Holy Land. Gotha: Justus Perthes.
