= Damun =

Damun الدامون Damun
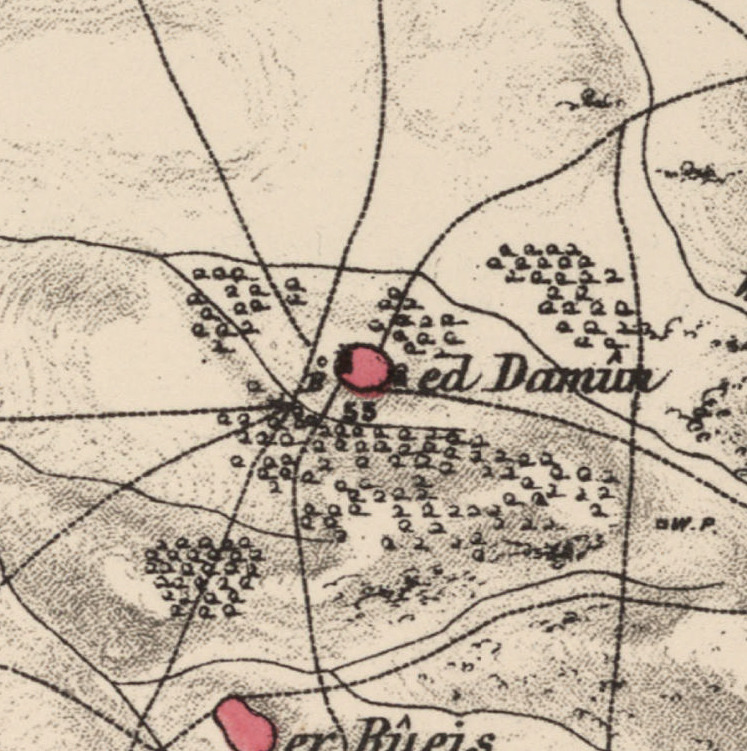
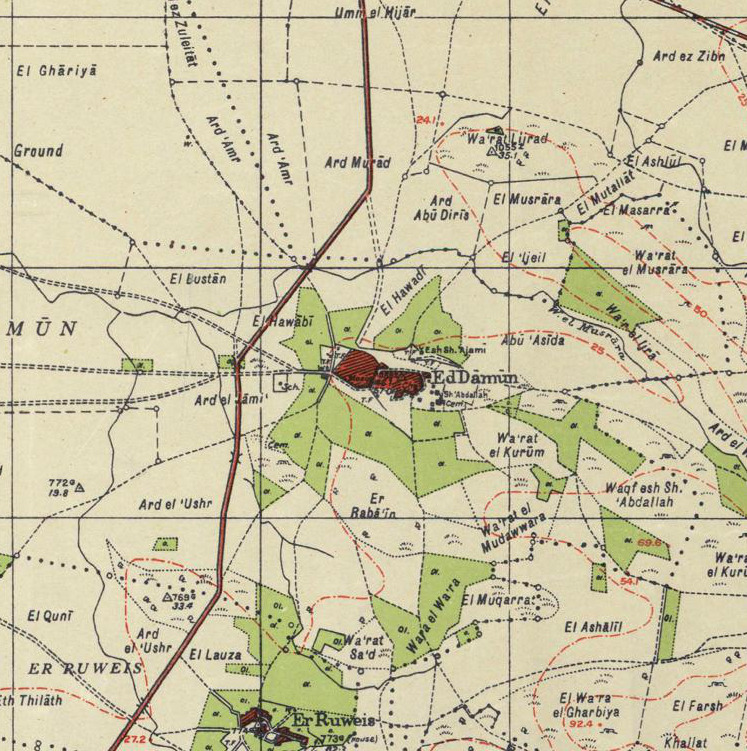
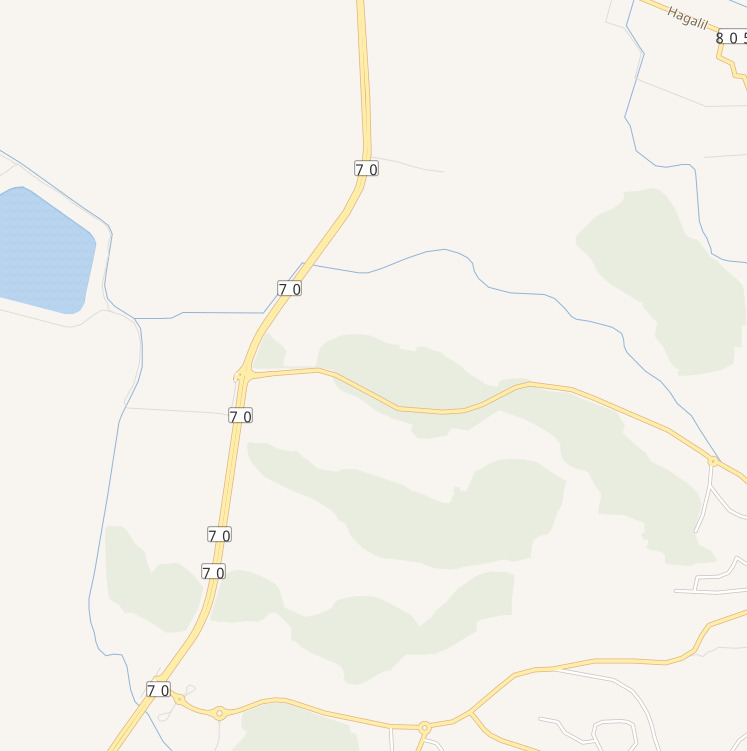
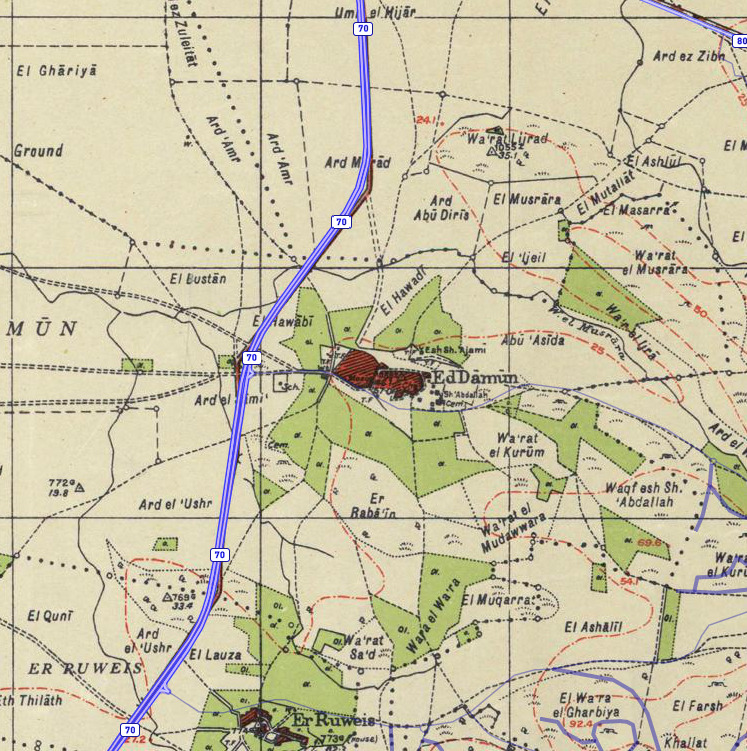
- 1870s map 1940s map modern map 1940s with modern overlay map A series of historical maps of the area around Al-Damun (click the buttons)

- Location within Mandatory Palestine
- Coordinates: 32°52′37″N 35°10′59″E
- Palestine grid: 167/254
- Geopolitical entity: Mandatory Palestine
- Subdistrict: Acre
- Date of depopulation: 15–16 July 1948

Area
  - Total: 20.4 km^{2} (7.9 sq mi)

Population (1945)
  - Total: 1,310
- Cause(s) of depopulation: Military assault by Yishuv forces

Damun (Arabic: الدامون, romanized: al-Damūn), was a Palestinian Arab village located 11.5 kilometres (7.1 mi) from the Mediterranean port city of Acre that was depopulated during 1948 Arab-Israeli war. In 1945, Damun had 1,310 inhabitants, most of whom were Muslim and the remainder Christians. Damun bordered the Na'amin River (Belus River), which the village's inhabitants used as a source of irrigation and drinking water from installed wells.

== History ==
Excavations at the site has shown potsherds dating from the Late Bronze Age, up to and including Early Islamic, Crusader, Mamluk and Ottoman times. It might be the village Damun in lower Galilee, noted in Roman times.

Damun is mentioned in 11th-century Arabic and Persian sources. Local tradition then identified the village as containing the tomb of the prophet Dhul-Kifl, who is twice mentioned in the Qur'an. Despite general Islamic tradition claiming the tomb to be in al-Kifl near Najaf or Kifl Hares near Nablus, Nasir Khusraw, who visited the region in 1047, wrote "I reached a small cave, which is in Damun where I performed the ziyarat too, for it is said to be the tomb of Dhul-Kifl."

After the Crusader invasion of Palestine in 1099, Damun became part of the Kingdom of Jerusalem and was referred to by the Crusaders as Damar or Damor. It remained in their hands when most of Palestine was conquered by the Ayyubids under Sultan Saladin in 1187. In 1253 John Aleman, Lord of Caesarea, sold several villages, including Damun, to the Knights Hospitaller. It was mentioned as part of the Crusaders' domain in the hudna (truce agreement) between the Acre-based Crusaders and the Mamluks under Sultan Qalawun in 1283.

=== Ottoman Empire ===
Damun, like the rest of Palestine, was incorporated into the Ottoman Empire in 1517, and in the defter (tax census) of 1596 the village was located in the Acre Nahiya (Subdistrict), part of the Safad Sanjak (District). The population consisted of 33 households and two bachelors, all Muslims. The inhabitants paid a fixed tax rate of 20% on wheat, barley, fruit trees, cotton, goats and beehives, in addition to "occasional revenues"; total revenue was 6,045 akçe. (Note: Note that Rhode, 1979, p. 6 Archived 2019-04-20 at the Wayback Machine writes that the Safad register that Hütteroth and Abdulfattah studied was not from 1595–1596, but from 1548–1549)

From the early 18th century to at least 1775, the village was controlled by the Zayadina, a local Arab family which rose to prominence in northern Palestine under the leadership of Sheikh Daher al-Umar. The village mosque was built by its multazim (tax farmer), Daher's uncle Ali ibn Salih al-Zaydani, in 1722–23. Inscriptions on the mosque provided key information about the genealogy of the Zayadina (namely the elusive name of Daher's grandfather) and included a poem dedicated to Ali ibn Salih. The village was mentioned as 'Damora' by Richard Pococke during his visit of the area in 1737. In 1761, Giovanni Mariti noted that around Damun and Mi'ar were two "delightful valleys, ornamented with groves and wild shrubs. The peasants who live in the hamlets around, enjoy a most pleasant situation." A map by Pierre Jacotin from Napoleon's invasion of 1799 showed the place, named as Damoun.

In 1875, Damun was prosperous with roughly 800 mostly Muslim inhabitants and two mosques. In addition to the purported tomb of Dhul-Kifl, there was a shrine dedicated to a certain Sheikh Abdallah on an adjacent hill. An elementary school for boys was founded by the Ottomans in 1886. A population list from about 1887 showed that Damun had about 725 inhabitants, all Muslims.

=== British Mandate ===
At the time of the 1922 census of Palestine, Damun had a population of 727, of whom 687 were Muslims and 40 were Christians. All the Christians were Roman Catholic. The population increased in the 1931 census to 917: 870 Muslims and 47 Christians, living in 183 houses.

At the start of the 20th century, Damun's houses were clustered along one road. Beginning in 1935, the residents started to build them with reinforced concrete. The inhabitants drew their drinking water from nearby springs and irrigated some of their crops from the Na'amin River. They also engaged in skilled activities, particularly plaiting mats and baskets from esparto grass. The chief crops of Damun were wheat, sorghum, barley, and olives, but it was also well known for its watermelons and cantaloupes.

In the 1945 statistics, the population of Damun was 1,310; 1,240 Muslims and 70 Christians, The village's total land area was 20,357 dunams. Plantations and irrigable land covered 709 dunams and 17,052 dunams were used for grains, while built-up (urban) area of the village consisted of 111 dunams.

=== 1948 war and aftermath ===
Before the 1948 Arab-Israeli War the Haganah kept files on all the Palestinian villages. The 1947 entry for al-Damun listed 25 individuals suspected of involvement with the Palestinian nationalist movement. In April 1948 Haganah reports say that the son of the main local landowner, Sadiq Karaman, paid the local Arab Liberation Army garrison P£5000 to leave, presumably in an attempt to keep the village from getting involved with the hostilities in the 1948 Palestine war.

After the initial Israeli successes in the central Galilee during the first stage of Operation Dekel, units of the Haganah's Sheva Brigade moved westward and captured Damun, among other Arab localities, in the second stage of the operation on 15–16 July 1948. Palestinian historian Aref al-Aref dates its capture earlier, in May 1948, following the fall of Acre. Israeli historian Benny Morris said that inhabitants were demoralized by the fall of Acre and then Nazareth, and so fled during the bombardment that preceded the attack on the village. The remaining residents were expelled and Damun was razed according to both historians.

The village's land is used for agriculture by residents of the Yas'ur kibbutz, which itself was built on the land of Birwa. According to Palestinian historian Walid Khalidi in 1992, the site was "overgrown with thorns, cacti, olive trees, and pines. Stone and concrete rubble is scattered around it. The structure that formerly protected the central water source and regulated its flow stands untended and is collapsing in several places. The cemetery is extant, although the markers over a few graves are collapsing." British historian Andrew Petersen writes that the village had a number of 18th or 19th-century stone houses, some which had decorated facades.

Most of the inhabitants of Damun became internally displaced Palestinians, now citizens of Israel, living in the nearby Tamra, Kabul, I'billin, and to a lesser extent Shefa-Amr, Sha'ab and other towns and villages in its vicinity. Descendants of the Zayadina, from the line of Ali, lived in Damun until 1948, after which they moved to Tamra and Kafr Manda. In 2008, the number of refugees and their descendants was estimated at over 12,600. Damun is among the Palestinian villages for which commemorative Marches of Return have taken place, typically as part of Nakba Day, such as the demonstrations organized by the Association for the Defence of the Rights of the Internally Displaced.

== See also ==
- Depopulated Palestinian locations in Israel

== Bibliography ==
- Al-Haj, Majid (2019) [1987]. Social Change And Family Processes: Arab Communities in Shefar-A'm. New York and Abingdon, Oxon: Routledge. ISBN 978-0-367-28747-4.
- Barag, Dan (1979). "A new source concerning the ultimate borders of the Latin Kingdom of Jerusalem". Israel Exploration Journal. 29 (3/4): 197–217. JSTOR 27925726.
- Barron, J.B., ed. (1923). Palestine: Report and General Abstracts of the Census of 1922. Government of Palestine.
- Cohen, Hillel (2010). Good Arabs: The Israeli Security Agencies and the Israeli Arabs, 1948–1967. Translated by Haim Watzman. Berkeley and Los Angeles: University of California Press. ISBN 978-0-520-26976-7.
- Clermont-Ganneau, C.S. (1888). Recueil d'archéologie orientale (in French). Vol. 1. Paris.
- Conder, C.R.; Kitchener, H.H. (1881). The Survey of Western Palestine: Memoirs of the Topography, Orography, Hydrography, and Archaeology. Vol. 1. London: Committee of the Palestine Exploration Fund.
- Delaville Le Roulx, J. (1883). Les archives, la bibliothèque et le trésor de l'Ordre de Saint-Jean de Jérusalem à Malte (in French and Latin). Paris: E. Leroux.
- Government of Palestine, Department of Statistics (1945). Village Statistics, April, 1945.
- Guérin, V. (1880). Description Géographique Historique et Archéologique de la Palestine (in French). Vol. 3: Galilee, pt. 1. Paris: L'Imprimerie Nationale.
- Hadawi, S. (1970). Village Statistics of 1945: A Classification of Land and Area ownership in Palestine. Palestine Liberation Organization Research Center. Archived from the original on 2018-12-08.
- Hütteroth, W.-D.; Abdulfattah, K. (1977). Historical Geography of Palestine, Transjordan and Southern Syria in the Late 16th Century. Erlanger Geographische Arbeiten, Sonderband 5. Erlangen, Germany: Vorstand der Fränkischen Geographischen Gesellschaft. ISBN 978-3-920405-41-4.
- Karmon, Y. (1960). "An Analysis of Jacotin's Map of Palestine" (PDF). Israel Exploration Journal. 10 (3, 4): 155–173, 244–253. Archived from the original (PDF) on 2019-12-22.
- Khalidi, W. (1992). All That Remains: The Palestinian Villages Occupied and Depopulated by Israel in 1948. Washington D.C.: Institute for Palestine Studies. ISBN 978-0-88728-224-9.
- Le Strange, G. (1890). Palestine Under the Moslems: A Description of Syria and the Holy Land from A.D. 650 to 1500. Committee of the Palestine Exploration Fund.
- Mariti, G. (1792). Travels Through Cyprus, Syria, and Palestine; with a General History of the Levant. Vol. 1. Dublin: P. Byrne.
- Mazarib, Tomer (2021). From Desert to Town: The Integration of Bedouin into Arab Fellahin Villages. Eastbourne: Sussex Academic Press. ISBN 9781789761535.
- Mills, E., ed. (1932). Census of Palestine 1931. Population of Villages, Towns and Administrative Areas. Jerusalem: Government of Palestine.
- Morris, B. (2004). The Birth of the Palestinian Refugee Problem Revisited. Cambridge University Press. ISBN 978-0-521-00967-6.
- Palmer, E.H. (1881). The Survey of Western Palestine: Arabic and English Name Lists Collected During the Survey by Lieutenants Conder and Kitchener, R. E. Transliterated and Explained by E.H. Palmer. Committee of the Palestine Exploration Fund.
- Pappé, I. (2006). The Ethnic Cleansing of Palestine. London and New York: Oneworld. ISBN 978-1-85168-467-0.
- Pococke, R. (1745). A Description of the East, and some Other Countries. Vol. 2. London: Printed for the author, by W. Bowyer.
- Petersen, Andrew (2001). A Gazetteer of Buildings in Muslim Palestine (British Academy Monographs in Archaeology). Vol. 1. Oxford University Press. ISBN 978-0-19-727011-0. Archived from the original on 2021-05-29.
- Rhode, H. (1979). Administration and Population of the Sancak of Safed in the Sixteenth Century. Columbia University. Archived from the original on 2020-03-01.
- Röhricht, R. (1893). (RRH) Regesta regni Hierosolymitani (MXCVII-MCCXCI) (in Latin). Berlin: Libraria Academica Wageriana.
- Schumacher, G. (1888). "Population list of the Liwa of Akka". Quarterly Statement - Palestine Exploration Fund. 20: 169–191.
- Sharon, M. (2004). Corpus Inscriptionum Arabicarum Palaestinae, D-F. Vol. 3. BRILL. ISBN 978-90-04-13197-2.
- Silbak, Saied (2023). "Chapter 5: "An Even Tougher Act of Resistance": Instrumentalism in the Dakhil". In Brehony, Louis (ed.). Palestinian Music in Exile: Voices of Resistance. Cairo and New York: The American University in Cairo Press. ISBN 978-1-649-03305-5.
- Stern, Eliezer (2010-03-17). "Ed-Damun Final Report". Hadashot Arkheologiyot – Excavations and Surveys in Israel (122).
- Tsafrir, Y.; Leah Di Segni; Judith Green (1994). (TIR): Tabula Imperii Romani: Judaea, Palaestina. Jerusalem: Israel Academy of Sciences and Humanities. ISBN 978-965-208-107-0.
- Ze'evi, Dror (1996). An Ottoman century: the district of Jerusalem in the 1600s. SUNY Press. ISBN 978-0-7914-2915-0. p. 89
