= Operation Dekel =

Israeli military offensive in northern Palestine during the 1948 Arab-Israeli War

Coordinates: 32°46′53.41″N 35°12′6.26″E

- Part of the 1948 Arab–Israeli War
Date	8–18 July 1948
Location	Lower Galilee
Result	Israeli victory

Belligerents
Israel Defense Forces	Arab Liberation Army

Commanders and leaders
Ben Dunkelman; Haim Fish †; Moshe Carmel; Yigal Alon	Fawzi al-Qawuqji

Units involved
7th Armored Brigade (Israel); Golani Brigade	

Operation Dekel (Hebrew: מבצע דקל, romanized: Mivtza Dekel, lit. 'Operation Palm Tree'), was the largest offensive by Israeli forces in the north of Palestine after the first truce of the 1948 Arab–Israeli War. It was carried out by the 7th Armoured Brigade led by Canadian volunteer Ben Dunkelman (called Benjamin Ben-David in Israel), a battalion from the Carmeli Brigade, and some elements from the Golani Brigade between 8–18 July. Its objective was to capture Nazareth and the Lower Galilee.

On 15 July Israeli aircraft bombed Saffuriya village and caused panic among the population; many of the villagers fled northwards toward Lebanon, others found shelter in Nazareth, leaving about 100 elderly people behind.

On the evening of 16 July, Nazareth surrendered to the Israelis after a light fight which left one Israeli dead and one wounded. The Arab Liberation Army forces in the village under the command of Fawzi al-Qawuqji retreated to the mountains in the north. In sharp contrast to the surrounding towns, the inhabitants of Nazareth were never forced to evacuate as Dunkelman refused to obey orders from Haim Laskov to evacuate them.

== Palestinian Arab villages captured in Operation Dekel ==
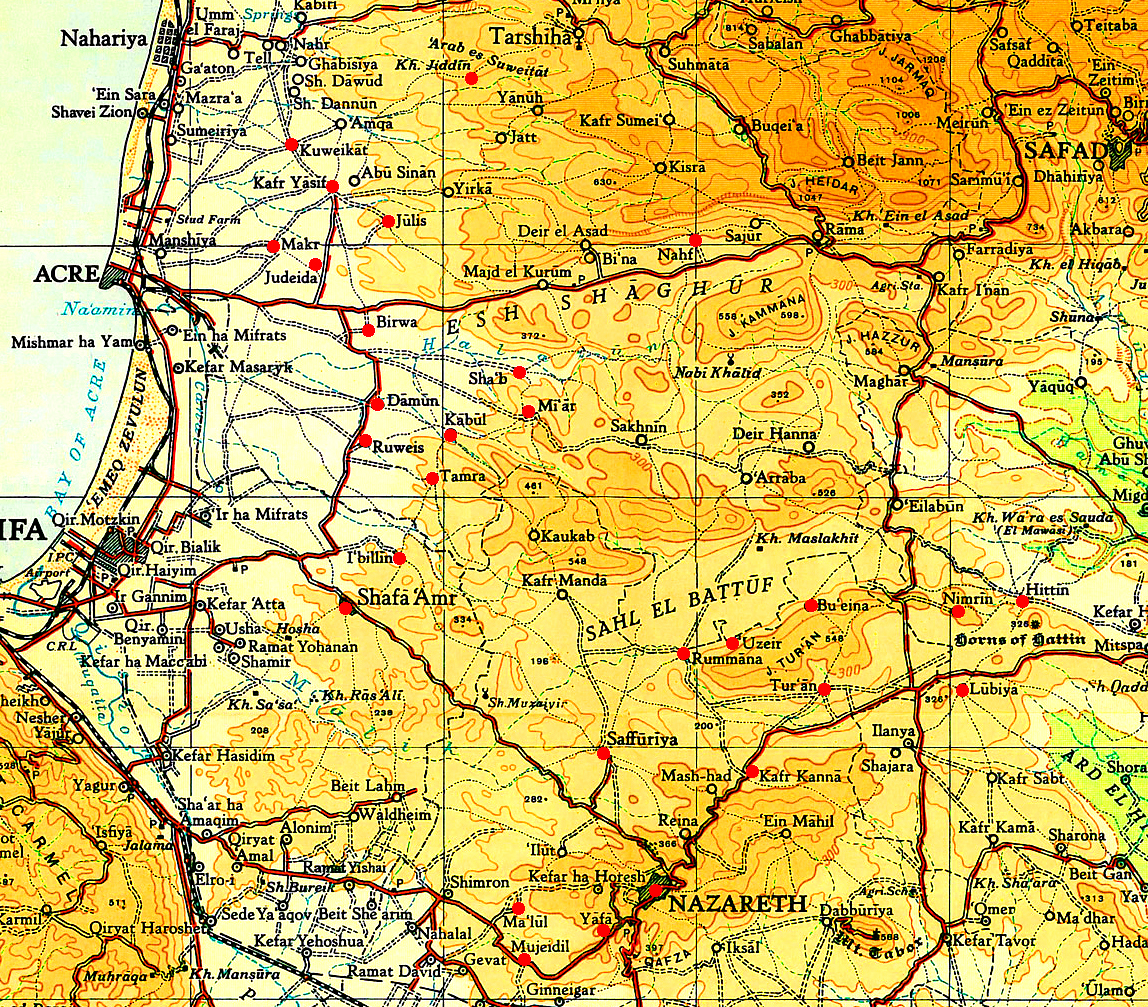
Operation Dekel. July 1948

Name	Population	Dates	Brigade	Notes
Kuwaykat	1,050	9	7th Armoured Brigade and Carmeli Brigade	Village depopulated and destroyed
Kafr Yasif	1,057 (1931)	10	Carmeli Brigade	Most of Muslim population as well as refugees from other villages deported. Town exists today.
Khirbat Jiddin	1,500	10–11		Village and bedouin camps depopulated and destroyed.
Julis	n/a (Druze)	8–14		Population allowed to remain in their homes. Town exists today.
Al-Makr	n/a	8–14		Town exists today.
I'billin	1,057	8–14		Muslim population expelled. Town exists today.
Shefa-'Amr	3,640	8–14	7th Armoured Brigade and Carmeli Brigade	Muslim population fled under bombardment. Town exists today as a city.
Kabul	457 (1931)	15	7th Armoured Brigade	Villagers remained. Town exists today.
Al-Mujaydil	1900	15	Golani Brigade	Village completely emptied and razed to the ground.
Ma'lul	690	15		Village depopulated and destroyed.
Saffuriya	4,000	16	7th Armoured Brigade and Carmeli Brigade	Villagers expelled. Hundreds of returnees expelled November 1948 and January 1949. Nothing remains.
Nazareth	18,000	16	Carmeli Brigade	Population allowed to remain. Town exists today.
Nimrin	320	17		Village depopulated and destroyed.
Lubya	2,370	17		Villagers not allowed to return. Village buildings destroyed in 1960s.
Hittin	1,190	17	Golani Brigade	Villagers fled before the attack and then prevented from returning. Village destroyed.
Amqa	1,240	15–16	7th Armoured Brigade and Carmeli Brigade	Village depopulated and destroyed.
ad-Damun	1,310	15–16	7th Armoured Brigade	Village bombarded, population expelled and buildings destroyed.
Tamra,		15–18	7th Armoured Brigade	Villagers evacuated 20 May. Re-populated with exiles from neighbouring villages.
Mi'ar	770	15–18	7th Armoured Brigade	Villagers fled from advancing soldiers. Village destroyed.
Yafa	833 (1931)	15–18		Town exists today.
Uzeir	150	15–18		Village exists today.
Kfar Kanna	1,175 (1922)	15–18	7th Armoured Brigade	Town exists today.
Rummana	590	15–18		Village exists today.
Bu'eina		15–18		Town exists today.
Al-Ruways	330	18	7th Armoured Brigade	Villagers fled under bombardment and buildings destroyed. Land now used by kibbutz Yas'ur.
Tur'an	1,350	18		Empty houses used for refugees expelled from other villages. Town exists today.
Nahf	200 (1881)	18	7th Armoured Brigade	Population allowed to remain. Town exists today.
Al-Birwa	1,460	18		Units of ALA involved in defending the village. After capture villagers were prevented from returning and the village was destroyed.
Sha'b	1,740	19		Villagers expelled, later replaced by exiles from other villages.

== See also ==
- Depopulated Palestinian locations in Israel
- List of battles and operations in the 1948 Palestine war
- Killings and massacres during the 1948 Palestine war
