= Kabul, Israel =

Arab town in northern Israel

Kabul: כָּבּוּל, כאבול; كابول
- Local council (from 1974)

Hebrew transcription(s)
  - ISO 259: Kabbul
  - Also spelled: al-Kabul (official)
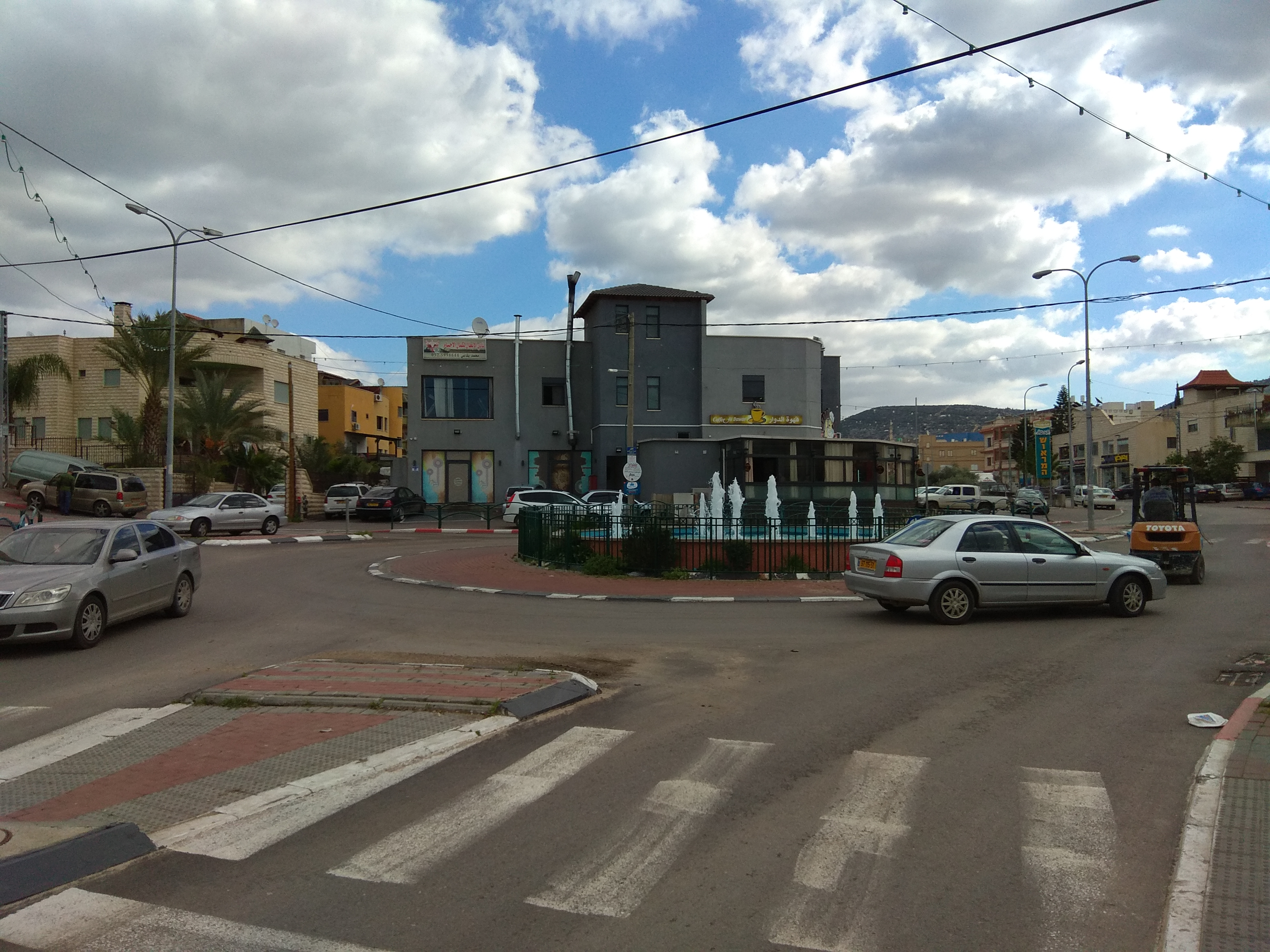
- Cyrus the Great square

- Location within Northwest Israel Location within Israel
- Coordinates: 32°52′11″N 35°12′8″E
- Grid position: 170/252 PAL
- Country: Israel
- District: Northern
- Subdistrict: Acre
- Natural Region: Shefar'am
- Founded: 1200 BCE (Biblical Cabul)

Government
  - Head of Municipality: Nader Taha

Area
  - Total: 7,149 dunams (7.149 km^{2}; 2.760 sq mi)

Population (2024)
  - Total: 12,589
  - Density: 1,761/km^{2} (4,561/sq mi)
- Name meaning: (1) from Kabul, a personal name; (2) (Phoenician) = "what does not please"

Kabul (Arabic: كابول; Hebrew: כָּבּוּל) is an Arab town in the Northern District of Israel, 14 kilometres (8.7 mi) southeast of Acre and north of Shefa-'Amr. In 2024 it had a population of 12,589.

== History ==
=== Classical era ===
Kabul is probably the Biblical Cabul mentioned in the Book of Joshua.

Fragments of pottery from the Persian period have been found in Kabul, as well as excavated burial chambers, used from the 1st to the 4th centuries.

During the Second Temple a family of kohanim lived in the village. The head priest was Shecania.

In Roman times, Josephus called it "Chabolo" and camped there. He says it was a post from which incursions were made into the Galilee.

Potsherds dating from the end of the Hellenistic–Early Roman period, Roman, and Byzantine periods have been found in the village. and bathhouse dating from the Byzantine Empire| era, and used well into the Umayyad era, have been excavated.

=== Middle Ages ===
Al-Muqaddasi visited Kabul in 985 CE, while it was under Abbasid rule. He writes that it was a town in the coastal district with fields of sugarcane: "They make the best sugar—better than in all the rest of Bilad ash-Sham." Ali of Herat reports in 1173 that two sons of Jacob are buried in the town, namely Reuben and Simeon. Kabul was one of the principal cities of Jund al-Urrdun.

Its Crusader name was "Cabor".

Remains of a building dating to the Mamluk period was excavated in 1999.

=== Ottoman Empire ===
In 1517, Kabul was incorporated into the Ottoman Empire. In 1596, the village appeared in Ottoman tax registers as being in the Nahiya of Acre, part of Safad Sanjak, with a population of 40 Muslim households, 9 Muslim bachelors, 14 Jewish households and 1 Jewish bachelor. The villagers paid a fixed tax rate of 25% on wheat, barley, fruit trees, cotton, and bees, in addition to "occasional revenues"; a total of 7,926 akçe.

In 1761, Giovanni Mariti noted that the village, which he called 'Tabul', lied in a "well-cultivated" valley that "abounds with productions of all kinds".

In 1859, the population was estimated to be 400 people, with 30 feddans as tillage. The French explorer Victor Guérin visited in 1875. He found many rock-cut cisterns, scattered cut stones, some of which were used in building, vestiges of a surrounding wall, and remains of sarcophagi adorned with discs and garlands."

In 1881, the Palestine Exploration Fund's Survey of Western Palestine described Kabul as a moderate sized village with olive groves to the north and south. A population list from about 1887 showed that Kabul had about 415 inhabitants; all Muslims.

=== British Mandate ===
In the 1922 census of Palestine conducted by the British Mandate authorities, the population is cited as 365 Muslims, increasing at the time of the 1931 census to 457, still all Muslims, in 100 houses.

In the 1945 statistics the population was up to 560 Muslims, while the total land area was 10,399 dunams, according to an official land and population survey. Of this, 1,065 were allocated for plantations and irrigable land, 5,539 for cereals, while 56 dunams were classified as built-up areas.

=== Israel ===
The village was captured by the Haganah on 15 July 1948 during Operation Dekel, particularly the Sheva Brigade. The village was not attacked and very few villagers left. However, some Kabul residents were among those from other villages who were expelled to 'Ara on 8 January 1949.

Currently, there are five mosques in the town. In 1974, it received the status of local council by the government.

== Demographics ==
Historical population
Year	Pop.	±%
1972	3,000	—
1983	5,300	+76.7%
1995	7,000	+32.1%
2008	11,900	+70.0%
2022	11,993	+0.8%
2024	12,589	+5.0%

In 1859 the population was estimated as being 400. In a 1922 census by the British Mandate of Palestine, Kabul had 365 inhabitants, rising to 457 in 1931. According to the Israel Central Bureau of Statistics, the town of Kabul had a population of 7,134 in 1995, rising to 9,400 in 2005. Its inhabitants are mostly Muslims. Kabul's prominent families are Rayan, Hamoud, Taha, Morad, Hamdony, Ibrahim, Hebi, Uthman, Ashkar, Sharari, Akari, Badran and Bouqai. The town hosts a large number of Internally displaced Palestinians from the nearby destroyed villages of al-Birwa, al-Damun, Mi'ar and al-Ruways. All of the inhabitants are Arab citizens of Israel, mostly adherents of Islam.

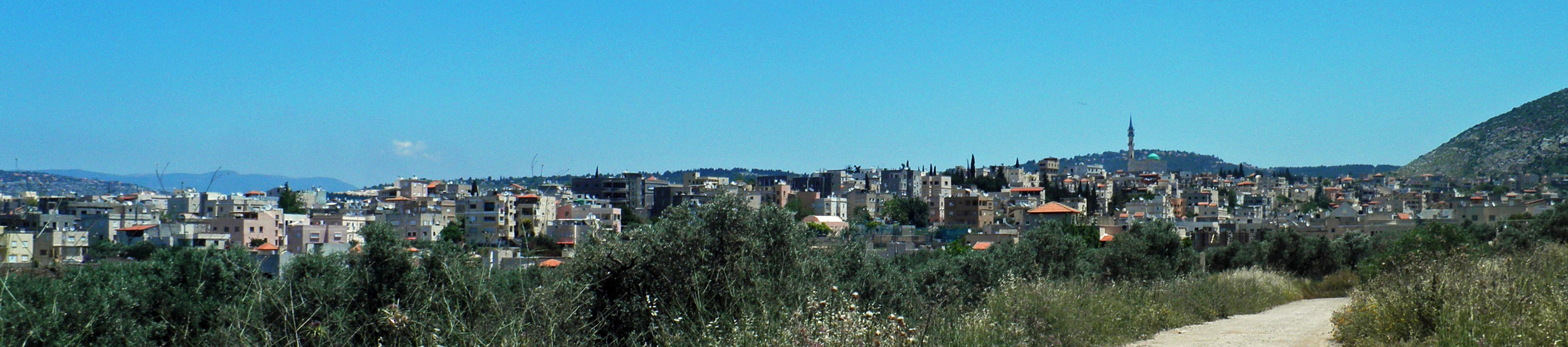
View of Kabul

== Voting Patterns ==
In the 2022 election, 99 percent of voters in Kabul voted for the Arab parties, while 0.5 percent voted for the parties of the center-left coalition led by Yair Lapid and 0.4 percent voted for the parties of the right-wing coalition led by Benjamin Netanyahu. Among the voters for the Arab parties, 36 percent voted for the Hadash–Ta'al list, while 32 percent voted for Balad and 31 percent voted for Ra'am.

In the 2026 election, 99 percent of voters in Kabul voted for the Arab parties, while 0.8 percent voted for the parties of the center-left coalition led by Gadi Eisenkot and 0.1 percent voted for the parties of the right-wing coalition led by Benjamin Netanyahu. Among the voters for the Arab parties, 65 percent voted for the Joint List, while 35 percent voted for Ra'am. Voter turnout increased 35 percent from the 2022 election.

== See also ==
- Arab localities in Israel

== Bibliography ==
- Abu Raya, Rafeh (2013-03-06). "Kabul". Hadashot Arkheologiyot – Excavations and Surveys in Israel (125).
- Abu Raya, Rafeh (2013-07-18). "Kabul -final report". Hadashot Arkheologiyot – Excavations and Surveys in Israel (125).
- Abu-‘Uqsa, Hanaa (2007-07-24). "Kabul". Hadashot Arkheologiyot – Excavations and Surveys in Israel (119).
- Barron, J. B., ed. (1923). Palestine: Report and General Abstracts of the Census of 1922. Government of Palestine.
- Conder, C.R.; Kitchener, H.H. (1881). The Survey of Western Palestine: Memoirs of the Topography, Orography, Hydrography, and Archaeology. Vol. 1. London: Committee of the Palestine Exploration Fund.
- Dauphin, C. (1998). La Palestine byzantine, Peuplement et Populations. BAR International Series 726 (in French). Vol. III : Catalogue. Oxford: Archeopress. ISBN 0-860549-05-4.
- Department of Statistics (1945). Village Statistics, April, 1945. Government of Palestine.
- Ellenblum, R. (2003). Frankish Rural Settlement in the Latin Kingdom of Jerusalem. Cambridge University Press. ISBN 9780521521871. (pp. 103(?), 129, 154, 194-197, 200, 202)
- Guérin, V. (1880). Description Géographique Historique et Archéologique de la Palestine (in French). Vol. 3: Galilee, pt. 1. Paris: L'Imprimerie Nationale.
- Hadawi, S. (1970). Village Statistics of 1945: A Classification of Land and Area ownership in Palestine. Palestine Liberation Organization Research Center.
- Hütteroth, W.-D.; Abdulfattah, K. (1977). Historical Geography of Palestine, Transjordan and Southern Syria in the Late 16th Century. Erlanger Geographische Arbeiten, Sonderband 5. Erlangen, Germany: Vorstand der Fränkischen Geographischen Gesellschaft. ISBN 3-920405-41-2.
- Le Strange, G. (1890). Palestine Under the Moslems: A Description of Syria and the Holy Land from A.D. 650 to 1500. Committee of the Palestine Exploration Fund.
- Mariti, G. (1792). Travels Through Cyprus, Syria, and Palestine; with a General History of the Levant. Vol. 1. Dublin: P. Byrne.
- Mills, E., ed. (1932). Census of Palestine 1931. Population of Villages, Towns and Administrative Areas. Jerusalem: Government of Palestine.
- Morris, B. (1993). Israel's Border Wars, 1949 - 1956. Arab Infiltration, Israeli Retaliation, and the Countdown to the Suez War. Oxford University Press. ISBN 0-19-827850-0.
- Mukaddasi (1886). Description of Syria, including Palestine. London: Palestine Pilgrims' Text Society. ( pp. 11, 85)
- Palmer, E.H. (1881). The Survey of Western Palestine: Arabic and English Name Lists Collected During the Survey by Lieutenants Conder and Kitchener, R. E. Transliterated and Explained by E.H. Palmer. Committee of the Palestine Exploration Fund.
- Petersen, Andrew (2001). A Gazetteer of Buildings in Muslim Palestine (British Academy Monographs in Archaeology). Vol. 1. Oxford University Press. ISBN 978-0-19-727011-0. p. 192-3
- Pringle, D. (1993). The Churches of the Crusader Kingdom of Jerusalem: Volume I A-K (excluding Acre and Jerusalem). Cambridge University Press. ISBN 0-521-39036-2.
- Rhode, H. (1979). Administration and Population of the Sancak of Safed in the Sixteenth Century (PhD). Columbia University. Archived from the original on 2020-03-01.
- Robinson, E.; Smith, E. (1856). Later Biblical Researches in Palestine and adjacent regions: A Journal of Travels in the year 1852. London: John Murray.
- Schumacher, G. (1888). "Population list of the Liwa of Akka". Quarterly Statement - Palestine Exploration Fund. 20: 169–191.
- Tsafrir, Y.; Leah Di Segni; Judith Green (1994). (TIR): Tabula Imperii Romani: Judaea, Palaestina. Jerusalem: Israel Academy of Sciences and Humanities. ISBN 965-208-107-8.
- Zidan, Omar; Alexandre, Yardenna (2012-12-31). "Kabul -final report". Hadashot Arkheologiyot – Excavations and Surveys in Israel (124).
