= Nimrin =

Nimrin نمرين
- Etymology: well-watered
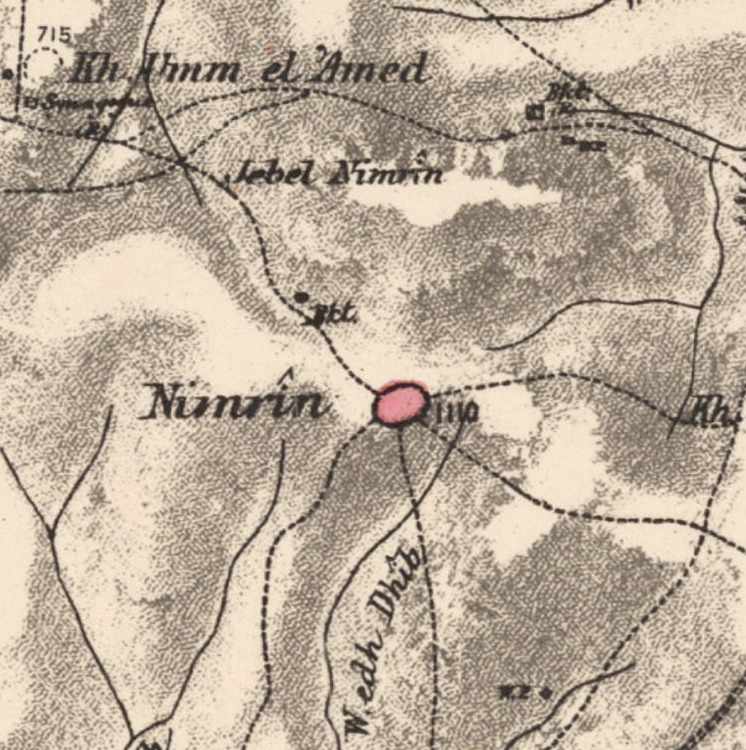
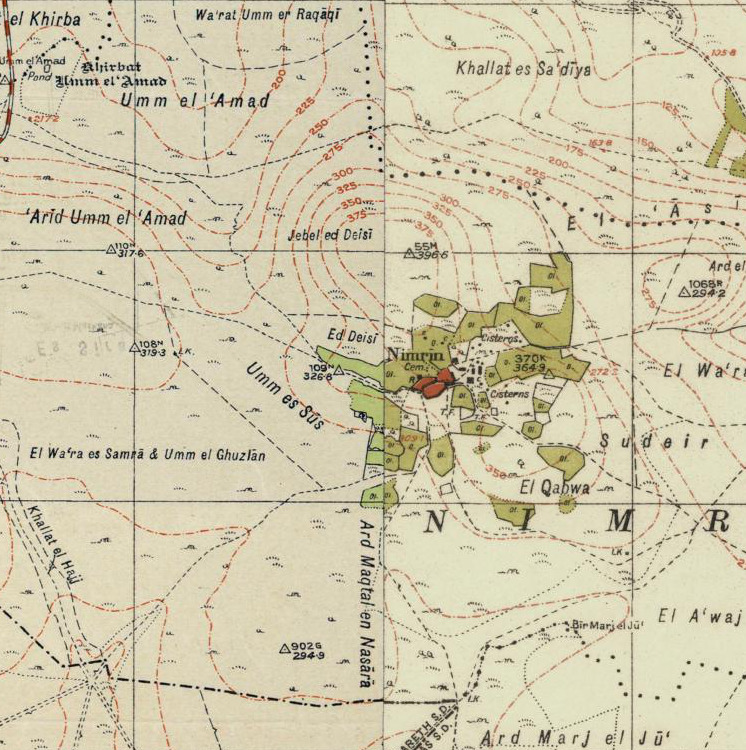
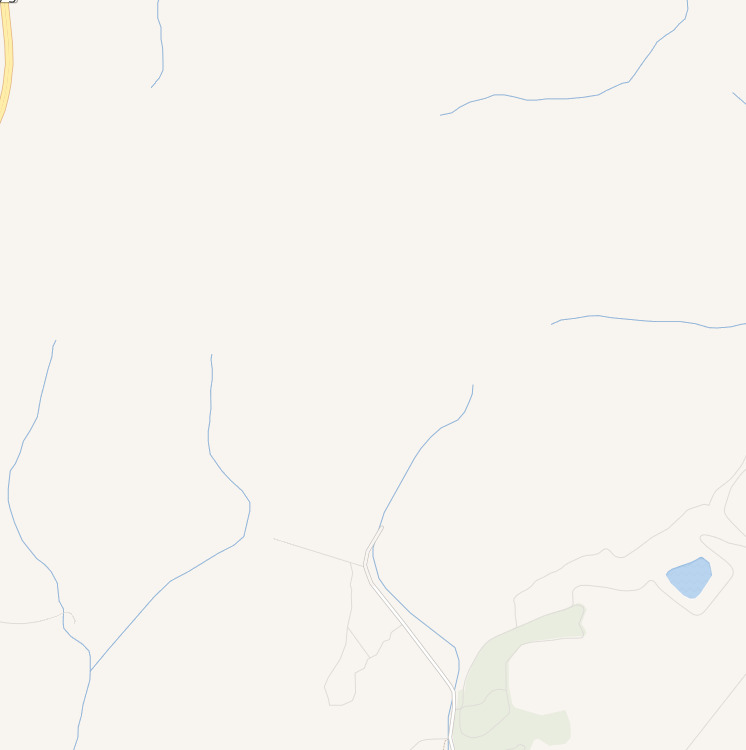
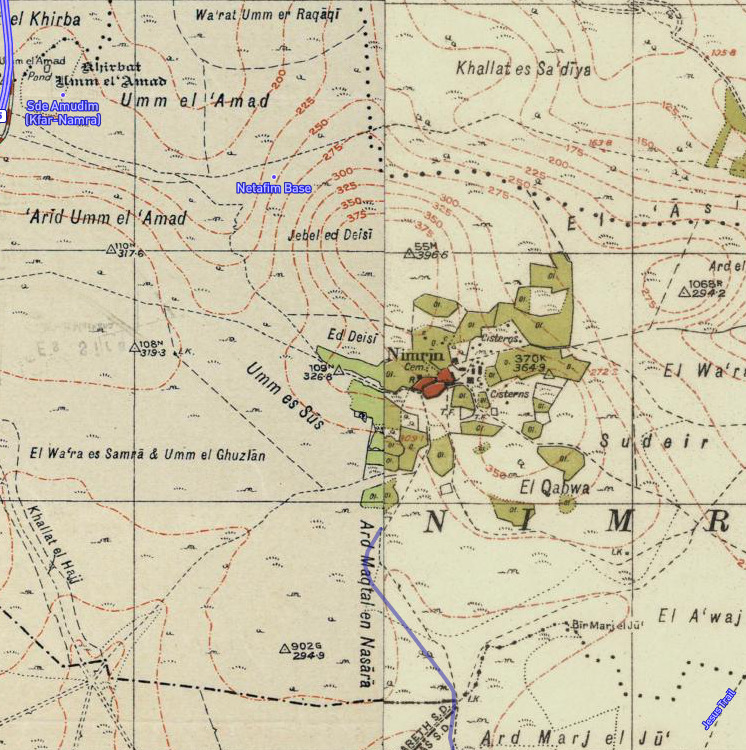
- 1870s map 1940s map modern map 1940s with modern overlay map A series of historical maps of the area around Nimrin (click the buttons)

- Location within Mandatory Palestine
- Coordinates: 32°48′15″N 35°25′24″E
- Palestine grid: 190/245
- Geopolitical entity: Mandatory Palestine
- Subdistrict: Tiberias
- Date of depopulation: 16-17 July 1948

Area
  - Total: 12,019 dunams (12.019 km^{2}; 4.641 sq mi)

Population (1945)
  - Total: 320
- Cause(s) of depopulation: Fear of being caught up in the fighting
- Secondary cause: Military assault by Yishuv forces
- Current Localities: Achuzzat Naftali, IDF ammunition depot

Nimrin was a Palestinian Arab town of 320 that was captured and depopulated by Israel during the 1948 Arab-Israeli War.

== History ==
Nimrin stood on the site of Kfar Nimra when Palestine was ruled by the Roman Empire. Its inhabitants were Jews when Saint Peter and Saint James visited the town in 30 CE.

=== Ottoman era ===
Nimrin was incorporated into the Ottoman Empire in the early sixteenth century CE, and by the 1596 tax records the village was under the administration of the nahiya ("subdistrict") of Tiberias, part of Safad Sanjak. It had a population of 20 households, an estimated 110 persons, all Muslim. The villagers paid a fixed tax rate of 25% on agricultural products, such as on wheat barley, wheat, olives, beehives, and goats; a total of 3,920 akçe. 1/3 of the revenue went to a waqf.

A map from Napoleon's invasion of 1799 by Pierre Jacotin showed the place, named as Nemen.

In the nineteenth century, Nimrin grew to become a stone-built village of 250 Muslim people. It was described as being built on the slope of a hill, surrounded by arable land. The Ottomans founded an elementary school in the village.

A population list from about 1887 showed Nimrin to have about 300 inhabitants; all Muslims.

=== British Mandate era ===
In 1922, Nimrin became a part of the British Mandate of Palestine and in the 1922 census of Palestine, Nemrin had a population of 273; all Muslims, increasing in the 1931 census to 316, still all Muslims, in a total of 71 houses.

The main economic sectors were farming and livestock, with grain being the most important crop, followed by vegetables. The Ottoman school was closed down during this period.

In the 1945 statistics the population consisted of 320 Muslims, and the total land area was 12,019 dunams. Of this, Arabs used 7,905 dunams for cereals, 335 for plantations and irrigable land, while 64 dunams were classified as built-up (urban) area.

=== 1948 war, and aftermath ===
During the 1948 Arab-Israeli War, Nimrin fell into Israeli hands on July 17, 1948, after nearby Lubya was captured at the end of Operation Dekel. Its entire population of 320 (1945) fled for unclear reasons. According to Walid Khalidi, "the site and a major part of the lands are surrounded by a fence."

== See also ==
- Depopulated Palestinian locations in Israel

== Bibliography ==
- Barron, J.B., ed. (1923). Palestine: Report and General Abstracts of the Census of 1922. Government of Palestine.
- Conder, C.R.; Kitchener, H.H. (1881). The Survey of Western Palestine: Memoirs of the Topography, Orography, Hydrography, and Archaeology. Vol. 1. London: Committee of the Palestine Exploration Fund.
- Government of Palestine, Department of Statistics (1945). Village Statistics, April, 1945.
- Hadawi, S. (1970). Village Statistics of 1945: A Classification of Land and Area ownership in Palestine. Palestine Liberation Organization Research Center.
- Hütteroth, W.-D.; Abdulfattah, K. (1977). Historical Geography of Palestine, Transjordan and Southern Syria in the Late 16th Century. Erlanger Geographische Arbeiten, Sonderband 5. Erlangen, Germany: Vorstand der Fränkischen Geographischen Gesellschaft. ISBN 3-920405-41-2.
- Karmon, Y. (1960). "An Analysis of Jacotin's Map of Palestine" (PDF). Israel Exploration Journal. 10 (3, 4): 155–173, 244–253. Archived from the original (PDF) on 2019-12-22.
- Khalidi, W. (1992). All That Remains: The Palestinian Villages Occupied and Depopulated by Israel in 1948. Washington D.C.: Institute for Palestine Studies. ISBN 0-88728-224-5.
- Mills, E., ed. (1932). Census of Palestine 1931. Population of Villages, Towns and Administrative Areas. Jerusalem: Government of Palestine.
- Morris, B. (2004). The Birth of the Palestinian Refugee Problem Revisited. Cambridge University Press. ISBN 978-0-521-00967-6.
- Murray, Lawrence (1997). The Amazing Spread of Christianity. St. Jude Press. ISBN 0-9722149-2-5.
- Palmer, E.H. (1881). The Survey of Western Palestine: Arabic and English Name Lists Collected During the Survey by Lieutenants Conder and Kitchener, R. E. Transliterated and Explained by E.H. Palmer. Committee of the Palestine Exploration Fund.
- Rhode, H. (1979). Administration and Population of the Sancak of Safed in the Sixteenth Century. Columbia University. Archived from the original on 2020-03-01.
- Schumacher, G. (1888). "Population list of the Liwa of Akka". Quarterly Statement - Palestine Exploration Fund. 20: 169–191.
