= Bu'eine Nujeidat =

Bu'eine Nujeidat: בועיינה-נוג'ידאת; بعينة-نجيدات
- Local council (from 1980)

Hebrew transcription(s)
  - ISO 259: Buˀéine - Nuǧeidat
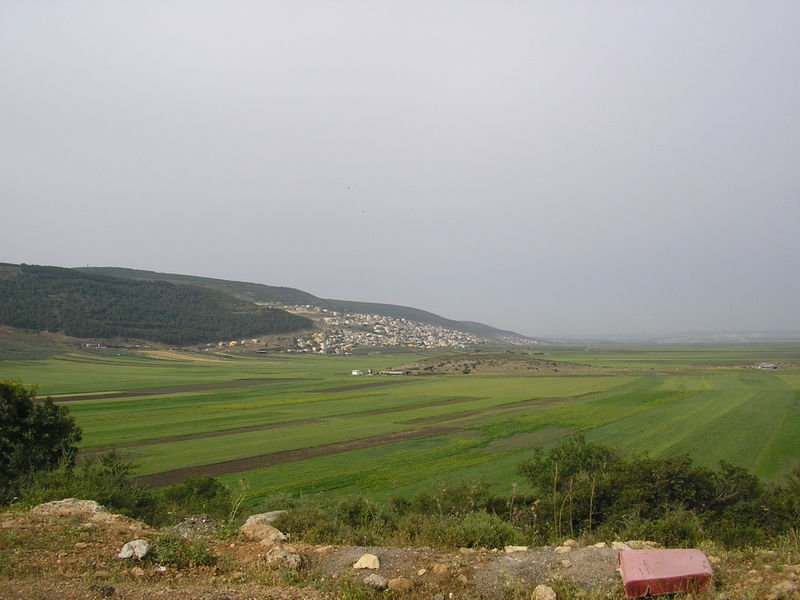
- Bu'eine Nujeidat, 2005

- Location within Northwest Israel Location within Israel
- Coordinates: 32°48′27″N 35°22′2″E
- Country: Israel
- District: Northern
- Subdistrict: Jezreel
- Natural Region: Nazareth-Tir'an Mountains

Area
  - Total: 7,058 dunams (7.058 km^{2}; 2.725 sq mi)

Population (2024)
  - Total: 10,630
  - Density: 1,506/km^{2} (3,901/sq mi)

Ethnicity
  - Arabs: 99.9%
  - Jews and others: 0.1%
- Name meaning: from personal name

Bu'eine Nujeidat (Hebrew: בועיינה-נוג'ידאת; Arabic: بعينة-نجيدات) is an Arab local council in the Northern District of Israel. Made up of two villages, Bu'eine and Nujeidat, they merged in 1987 and were recognized as one local council in 1996. In 2024 its population was 10,630; 99,9% was Muslim and 0.1% was Christian.

== History ==
Bu'eine is a village located on an ancient site. A small jug from the Iron Age, and potsherds from the Roman and Byzantine periods have been found here. A possible Roman or Byzantine grave is also located here.

Potsherds from the early Islamic and Mamluk period have also been found.

=== Ottoman Empire ===
In 1517, the village was included in the Ottoman Empire with the rest of Palestine, and in the 1596 tax-records it appeared as al-Bu'ayna, located in the Nahiya of Tabariyya, part of Safad Sanjak. The population was 38 households and 6 bachelors, all Muslim. They paid a fixed tax-rate of 25% on agricultural products, including wheat, barley, fruit trees and cotton, in addition to occasional revenues, and goats and beehives; a total of 2420 akçe.

A map from Napoleon's invasion of 1799 by Pierre Jacotin showed Bu'eine, named as Beni.

In 1875, when Victor Guérin visited, the village had at most 150 inhabitants. Guérin further noted that "below the village, on the north-east side, a curious reservoir cut in the rock, with three troughs. Steps lead down into it. Within it is covered with a thick cement, and vaulted over with cut stones. The water formerly flowed into it through a conduit now choked. The mosque of the village is an ancient church, a new door having been made in the north side. The slopes of the hill were formerly covered with houses, built in terraces. Rude characters were found traced on the rocks about 600 paces to the east of the village."

In 1881 the PEF's Survey of Western Palestine (SWP) described El Baineh as, "a village built on the hillside, containing 200 Moslem inhabitants. It possesses a spring, and there are olive-groves in the plain to the north."

=== British Mandate ===
In the 1922 census of Palestine conducted by the British Mandate authorities, Bu’aniyeh had a population of 212, all Muslims, increasing in the 1931 census to 349, of whom 2 were Jews and the rest Muslims, in a total of 67 occupied houses.

In the 1945 statistics the population of Bu'eina was 540, all Muslims, while the total land area was 9,214 dunams, according to an official land and population survey. Of this, 782 were allocated for plantations and irrigable land, 13,223 for cereals, while 30 dunams were classified as built-up areas. All the inhabitants were Muslim.

=== Israel ===
Bu'eine was captured by the Israeli army during the second part of Operation Dekel, 15–18 July 1948. It remained under Martial Law until 1966.

== Demographics ==
Historical population
Year	Pop.	±%
1972	1,500	—
1983	2,300	+53.3%
1995	5,700	+147.8%
2008	7,800	+36.8%
2022	10,087	+29.3%
2024	10,630	+5.4%

== Voting Patterns ==
In the 2022 election, 95 percent of voters in Bu'eine Nujeidat voted for the Arab parties, while 2 percent voted for the parties of the center-left coalition led by Yair Lapid and 2 percent voted for the parties of the right-wing coalition led by Benjamin Netanyahu. Among the voters for the Arab parties, 59 percent voted for Ra'am, while 25 percent voted for Balad and 16 percent voted for the Hadash–Ta'al list.

In the 2026 election, 97 percent of voters in Bu'eine Nujeidat voted for the Arab parties, while 2 percent voted for the parties of the center-left coalition led by Gadi Eisenkot and 0.4 percent voted for the parties of the right-wing coalition led by Benjamin Netanyahu. Among the voters for the Arab parties, 53 percent voted for Ra'am, while 47 percent voted for the Joint List. Voter turnout increased 57 percent from the 2022 election.

== See also ==
- Arab localities in Israel

== Bibliography ==
- Alexandre, Yardenna (2016-12-04). "Bu'eina-Nujidat". Hadashot Arkheologiyot – Excavations and Surveys in Israel (128). doi:10.69704/jhaesi.116.2004.25111.
- Barron, J.B., ed. (1923). Palestine: Report and General Abstracts of the Census of 1922. Government of Palestine.
- Conder, C.R.; Kitchener, H.H. (1881). The Survey of Western Palestine: Memoirs of the Topography, Orography, Hydrography, and Archaeology. Vol. 1. London: Committee of the Palestine Exploration Fund.
- Dalali-Amos, Edna (2006-07-30). "Bu'eina Final Report". Hadashot Arkheologiyot – Excavations and Surveys in Israel (118). Archived from the original on 2015-09-24.
- Dauphin, C. (1998). La Palestine byzantine, Peuplement et Populations. BAR International Series 726 (in French). Vol. III : Catalogue. Oxford: Archeopress. ISBN 0-860549-05-4.
- Efron, Alexander (2018-05-08). "Bu'eina-Nujidat". Hadashot Arkheologiyot – Excavations and Surveys in Israel (130). doi:10.69704/jhaesi.116.2004.25424.
- Government of Palestine, Department of Statistics (1945). Village Statistics, April, 1945.
- Guérin, V. (1880). Description Géographique Historique et Archéologique de la Palestine (in French). Vol. 3: Galilee, pt. 1. Paris: L'Imprimerie Nationale.
- Hadawi, S. (1970). Village Statistics of 1945: A Classification of Land and Area ownership in Palestine. Palestine Liberation Organization Research Center.
- Hütteroth, W.-D.; Abdulfattah, K. (1977). Historical Geography of Palestine, Transjordan and Southern Syria in the Late 16th Century. Erlanger Geographische Arbeiten, Sonderband 5. Erlangen, Germany: Vorstand der Fränkischen Geographischen Gesellschaft. ISBN 3-920405-41-2.
- Karmon, Y. (1960). "An Analysis of Jacotin's Map of Palestine" (PDF). Israel Exploration Journal. 10 (3, 4): 155–173, 244–253. Archived from the original (PDF) on 2019-12-22.
- Mills, E., ed. (1932). Census of Palestine 1931. Population of Villages, Towns and Administrative Areas. Jerusalem: Government of Palestine.
- Morris, B. (1987). The Birth of the Palestinian refugee problem, 1947-1949. Cambridge University Press. ISBN 0-521-33028-9.
- Palmer, E.H. (1881). The Survey of Western Palestine: Arabic and English Name Lists Collected During the Survey by Lieutenants Conder and Kitchener, R. E. Transliterated and Explained by E.H. Palmer. Committee of the Palestine Exploration Fund.
- Porat, Leea (2007-12-24). "Bu'eina Final Report". Hadashot Arkheologiyot – Excavations and Surveys in Israel (119). Archived from the original on 2015-09-24.
- Rhode, H. (1979). Administration and Population of the Sancak of Safed in the Sixteenth Century (PhD). Columbia University. Archived from the original on 2019-04-20.
- Tsafrir, Y.; Leah Di Segni; Judith Green (1994). (TIR): Tabula Imperii Romani: Judaea, Palaestina. Jerusalem: Israel Academy of Sciences and Humanities. ISBN 965-208-107-8. (p. 80)
