= Ayashi =

Ayashi may refer to:

- 3994 Ayashi, a main-belt asteroid
- Ayashi Station, a railway station in Japan
- Essam Ayashi (born 1999), an Israeli footballer
