= Essam Ayashi =

Israeli footballer

Esam Ayashi אסאם עישי
Personal information
- Full name: Esam Ahmad Ayashi
- Date of birth: 15 April 1999 (age 27)
- Place of birth: Kabul, Israel
- Position: Defender

Team information
- Current team: F.C. Tira

Youth career
- 2009–2012: FC Nesher
- 2012–2018: Maccabi Netanya

Senior career*
Years	Team	Apps	(Gls)
2017–2022	Maccabi Netanya	2	(0)
2018	→ Hapoel Marmorek (loan)	7	(0)
2019–2020	→ Ironi Tiberias (loan)	22	(0)
2020–2022	→ F.C. Tira (loan)	37	(0)
2022–2024	F.C. Tira	59	(0)
2024–2025	Maccabi Ironi Kiryat Ata	12	(0)
2025–	Maccabi Bnei Jadeidi	10	(1)

International career
2017	Israel U19	3	(0)
- * Club domestic league appearances and goals as of 19 February 2025

Esam Ayashi (Hebrew: אסאם עישי; born 15 April 1999) is an Israeli footballer who plays as a defender for Maccabi Bnei Jadeidi.
