= Al-Ruways =

Al-Ruways الرويس al-Ruweis
- Former village
- Etymology: "The little hilltop", or "headland"
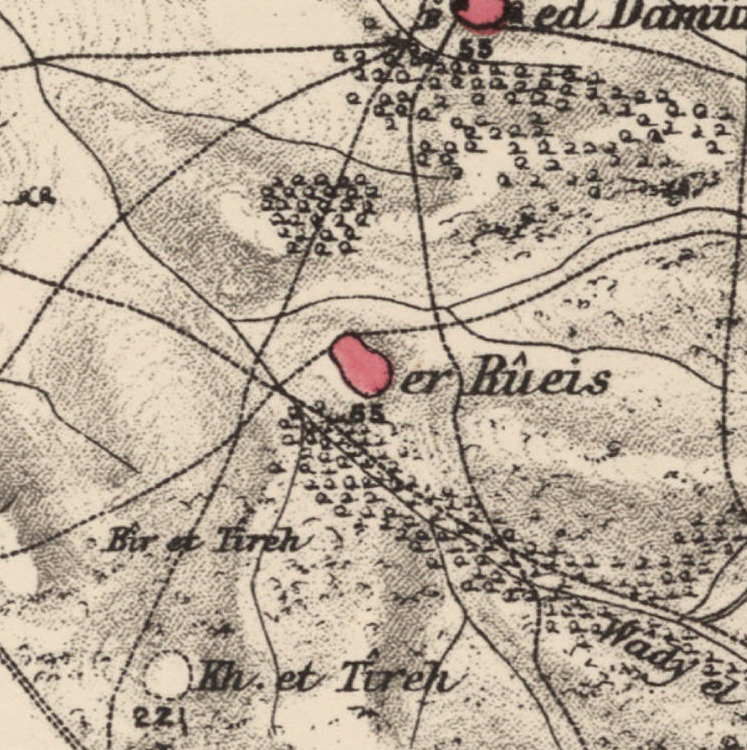
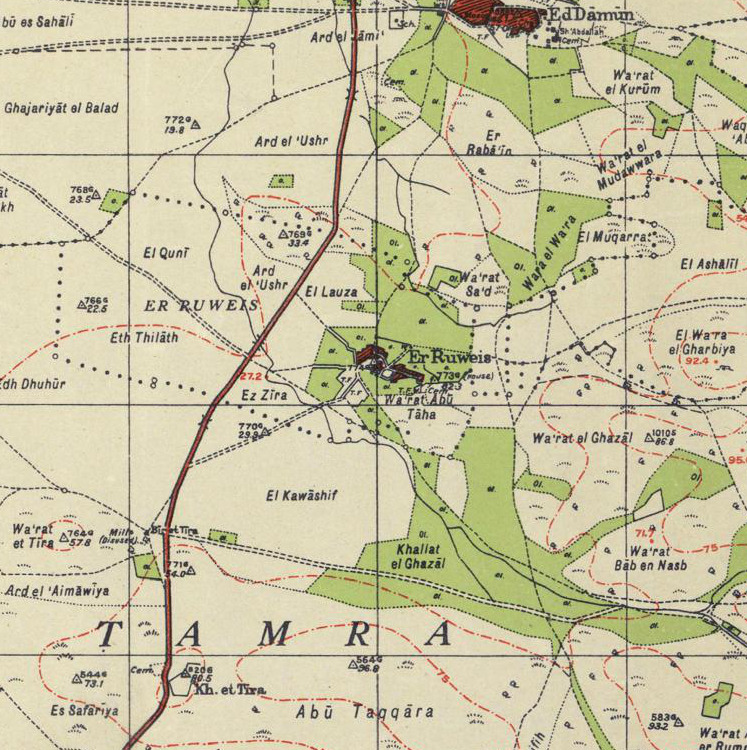
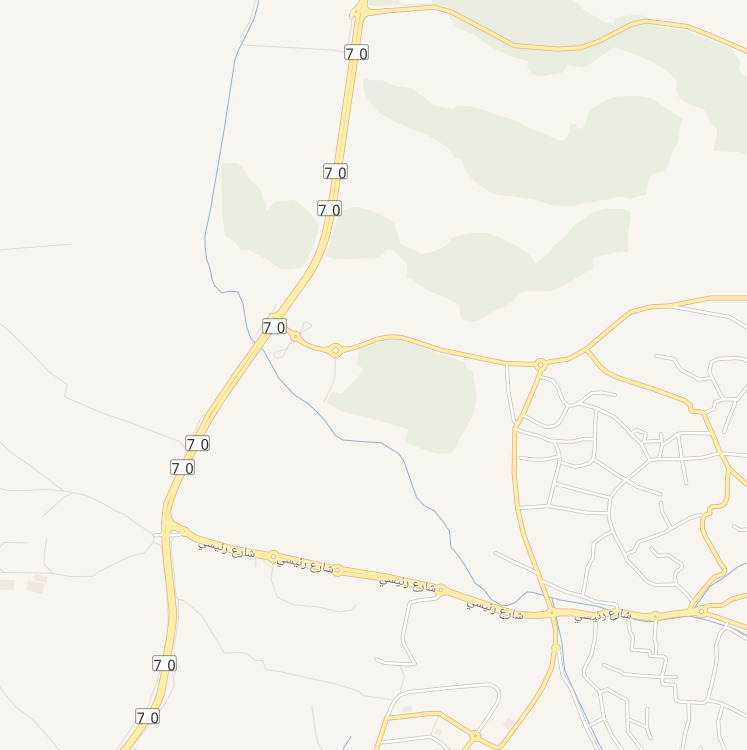
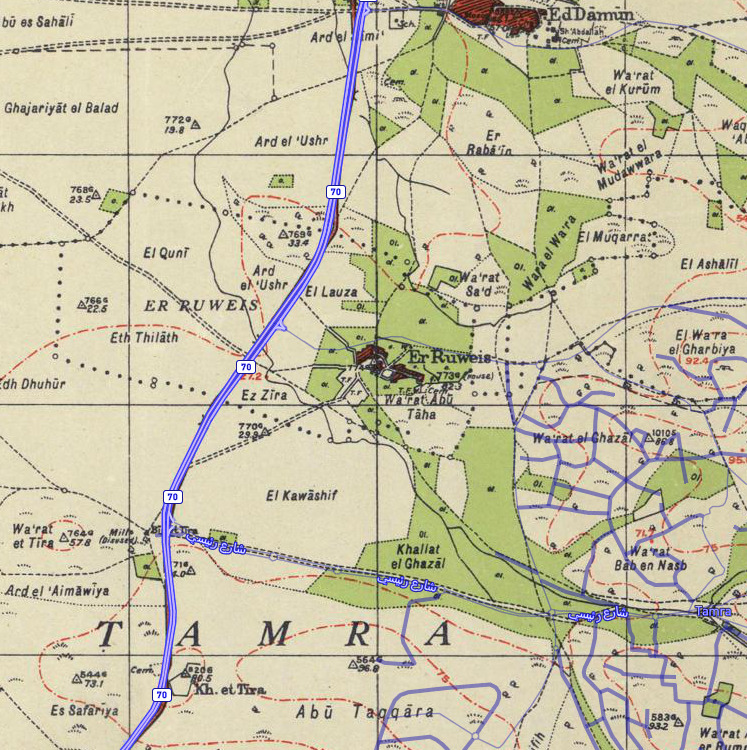
- 1870s map 1940s map modern map 1940s with modern overlay map A series of historical maps of the area around Al-Ruways (click the buttons)

- Location within Mandatory Palestine
- Coordinates: 32°51′50″N 35°10′41″E
- Palestine grid: 167/252
- Geopolitical entity: Mandatory Palestine
- Subdistrict: Acre
- Date of depopulation: July 15–16, 1948

Area
  - Total: 1,163 dunams (1.163 km^{2}; 0.449 sq mi)

Population (1945)
  - Total: 330
- Cause(s) of depopulation: Military assault by Yishuv forces

Al-Ruways (Arabic: الرويس), was a Palestinian Arab village on a rocky hill located 12 kilometers (7.5 mi) southeast of Acre and south of the village of al-Damun. Its population in 1945 was 330. Al-Ruways was depopulated following its capture by Israeli forces during the 1948 Arab-Israeli War.

== History ==
=== Middle Ages ===
Al-Ruways stood on the site of the Crusader town of Careblier, which was also referred to by the Crusaders as Roeis. In 1220, Beatrix de Courtenay and her husband Count Otto von Botenlauben, Henneberg, sold their land, including Roeis’, to the Teutonic Knights. However, they appeared not to have sole ownership, as in 1253 John Aleman, Lord of Caesarea, sold several villages, including Roeis, to the Knights Hospitaller. In 1266, a Crusader vanguard returning from a raid in Tiberias to Acre was ambushed at Roeis by Mamluk forces based in Safad. In 1283 it was mentioned as part of the domain of the Crusaders in the hudna (truce) between the Acre-based Crusaders and the Mamluk sultan al-Mansur Qalawun.

Based on tradition, the people of the village professed to have blood relations with Husam ad-Din Abu al-Hija. Hussam ad-Din was a high-ranking officer in the Ayyubid army of Sultan Saladin.

=== Ottoman era ===
French explorer Victor Guérin visited al-Ruways in 1875, and noted that the village contained "150 people at most, whose homes are located on a hill, amid gardens filled with fig, pomegranate and olive trees, and here and there are palm trees".

In 1881, the PEF's Survey of Western Palestine described al-Ruways as being situated on open ground with olive groves to the north of the village. Its population of 400 was entirely Muslim.

A population list from about 1887 showed that Ruweis had about 190 inhabitants; all Muslims.

=== British Mandate era ===
Under the British Mandate of Palestine in the early twentieth century, al-Ruways was one of the smallest villages in the District of Acre. In the 1922 census Al-Ruways had a population of 154; all Muslims, increasing in the 1931 census to 217, still all Muslim, in a total of 44 houses. and consisting of two quarters.

The village had a mosque. Its children attended school in nearby al-Damun. The inhabitants' drinking water came from domestic wells, and they primarily grew wheat, corn, sesame, watermelons, and olives.

In the 1945 statistics the population of al-Ruways was 330 Muslims, who owned 1,163 dunams of land according to an official land and population survey. 222 dunams were plantations and irrigable land, 844 used for cereals, while built-up areas consisted of 15 dunams.

=== Israeli rule ===
On 18 July 1948, two days after Nazareth was occupied by Israel's Seventh Armored Brigade in Operation Dekel, some units advanced into the Western Galilee and captured a number of Arab villages, one of which was al-Ruways. The inhabitants fled after bombardment and the fall of major towns in the vicinity, namely Shefa-'Amr and Nazareth. Following the war the area was incorporated into the State of Israel. According to Palestinian historian Walid Khalidi, "the site is deserted. The debris of old wells and cement roofs is strewn of over the site, which is otherwise covered by a forest of eucalyptus trees and cactus." By 1992 there were no villages on al-Ruways land, but the surrounding area was cultivated by residents of kibbutz Yas'ur.

== See also ==
- Depopulated Palestinian locations in Israel
- Ein Hod

== Bibliography ==
- Al-Maqrizi (1845). Histoire des sultans mamlouks, de l'Égypte, écrite en arabe (in French and Latin). Vol. 2. Translator: Étienne Marc Quatremère. Paris: Oriental Translation Fund of Great Britain and Ireland. (pp. 179-185, 224-235.)
- Barag, Dan (1979). "A new source concerning the ultimate borders of the Latin Kingdom of Jerusalem". Israel Exploration Journal. 29 (3/4): 197–217. JSTOR 27925726.
- Barron, J. B., ed. (1923). Palestine: Report and General Abstracts of the Census of 1922. Government of Palestine.
- Benvenisti, M. (2000). Sacred Landscape: The Buried History of the Holy Land since 1948. University of California Press. Archived from the original on 2006-09-04.
- Bronstein, Judith (2005). The Hospitallers and the Holy Land: Financing the Latin East, 1187-1274. Boydell Press. ISBN 978-1-84383-131-0.
- Clermont-Ganneau, C.S. (1888). Recueil d'archéologie orientale (in French). Vol. 1. Paris.
- Conder, C.R.; Kitchener, H.H. (1881). The Survey of Western Palestine: Memoirs of the Topography, Orography, Hydrography, and Archaeology. Vol. 1. London: Committee of the Palestine Exploration Fund.
- Conder, C.R. (1890). "Norman Palestine". Quarterly Statement - Palestine Exploration Fund. 22: 29–37. doi:10.1179/peq.1890.22.1.29. (p. 35)
- Dauphin, C. (1998). La Palestine byzantine, Peuplement et Populations. BAR International Series 726 (in French). Vol. III : Catalogue. Oxford: Archeopress. ISBN 0-860549-05-4. (p. 663)
- Delaville Le Roulx, J. (1883). Les archives, la bibliothèque et le trésor de l'Ordre de Saint-Jean de Jérusalem à Malte (in French and Latin). Paris: E. Leroux.
- Department of Statistics (1945). Village Statistics, April, 1945. Government of Palestine.
- Frankel, Rafael (1988). "Topographical notes on the territory of Acre in the Crusader period". Israel Exploration Journal. 38 (4): 249–272. JSTOR 27926125.
- Guérin, V. (1880). Description Géographique Historique et Archéologique de la Palestine (in French). Vol. 3: Galilee, pt. 1. Paris: L'Imprimerie Nationale.
- Hadawi, S. (1970). Village Statistics of 1945: A Classification of Land and Area ownership in Palestine. Palestine Liberation Organization Research Center. Archived from the original on 2018-12-08.
- Khalidi, W. (1992). All That Remains: The Palestinian Villages Occupied and Depopulated by Israel in 1948. Washington D.C.: Institute for Palestine Studies. ISBN 0-88728-224-5.
- Mills, E., ed. (1932). Census of Palestine 1931. Population of Villages, Towns and Administrative Areas. Jerusalem: Government of Palestine.
- Morris, B. (2004). The Birth of the Palestinian Refugee Problem Revisited. Cambridge University Press. ISBN 0-521-00967-7.
- Palmer, E.H. (1881). The Survey of Western Palestine: Arabic and English Name Lists Collected During the Survey by Lieutenants Conder and Kitchener, R. E. Transliterated and Explained by E.H. Palmer. Committee of the Palestine Exploration Fund.
- Röhricht, R. (1893). (RRH) Regesta regni Hierosolymitani (MXCVII-MCCXCI) (in Latin). Berlin: Libraria Academica Wageriana.
- Schumacher, G. (1888). "Population list of the Liwa of Akka". Quarterly Statement - Palestine Exploration Fund. 20: 169–191.
- Strehlke, E., ed. (1869). Tabulae Ordinis Theutonici ex tabularii regii Berolinensis codice potissimum. Berlin: Weidmanns.
