= Yussef Diab =

Israeli politician (1917–1984)

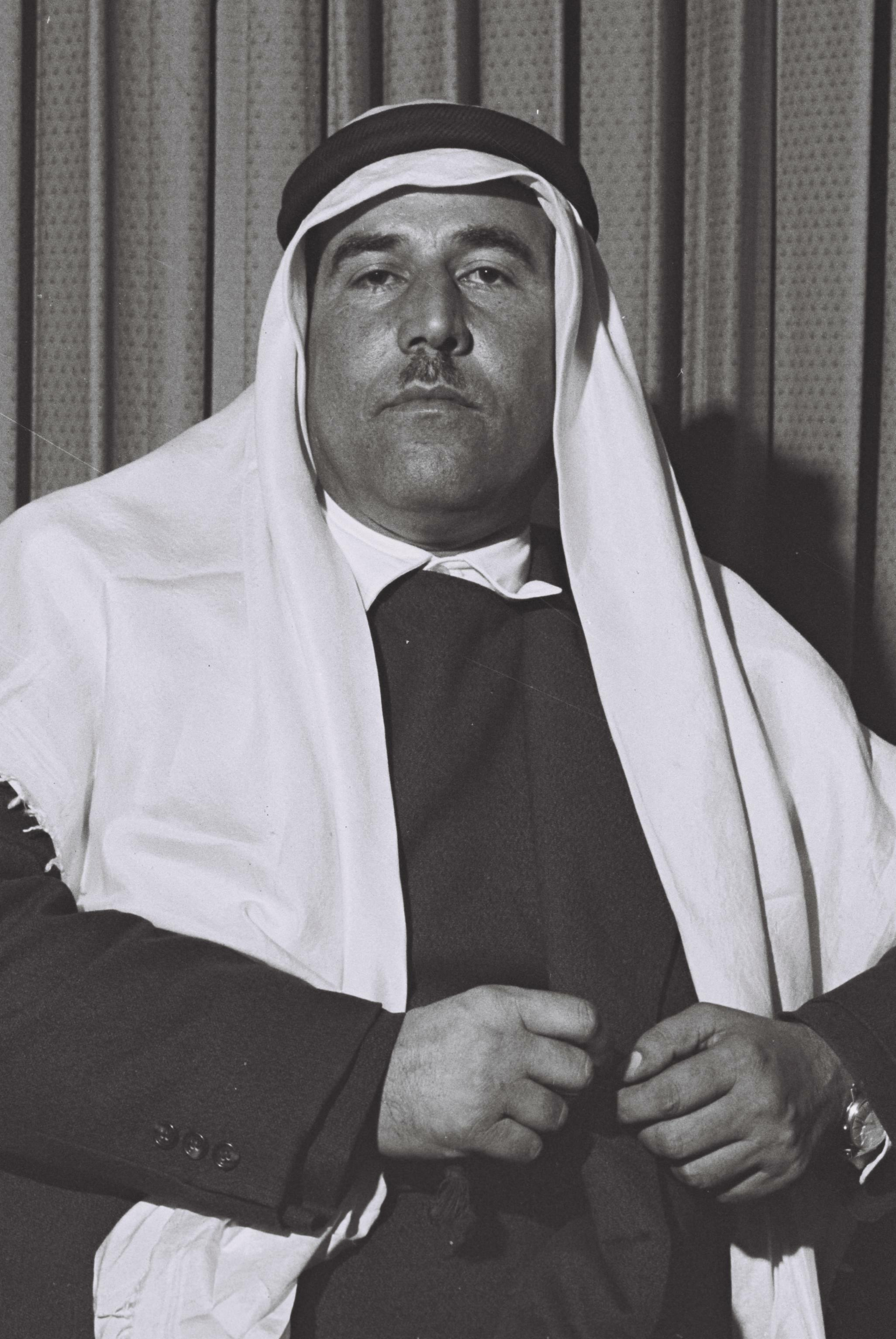
- Diab in 1959

Faction represented in the Knesset
- 1959–1961: Cooperation and Brotherhood

Personal details
- Born: 1917 Tamra, Palestine
- Died: 18 February 1984 (aged 66–67)

Yussef Abdallah Diab (Arabic: يوسف عبدالله دياب, Hebrew: יוסף דיאב; 1917 – 18 February 1984) was an Israeli Arab politician who served as a member of the Knesset for Cooperation and Brotherhood between 1959 and 1961.

== Biography ==
Born in Tamra in 1917, Diab was placed second on the Cooperation and Brotherhood list for the 1959 Knesset elections, and was elected as the party won two seats. He was placed third on the party's list for the 1961 elections, losing his seat as the party won two seats.

For the 1965 elections he was placed 76th on the Progress and Development list, which won two seats.

He died in 1984.
