= Yas'ur =

Kibbutz in northern Israel

Yas'ur: יַסְעוּר (Hebrew)
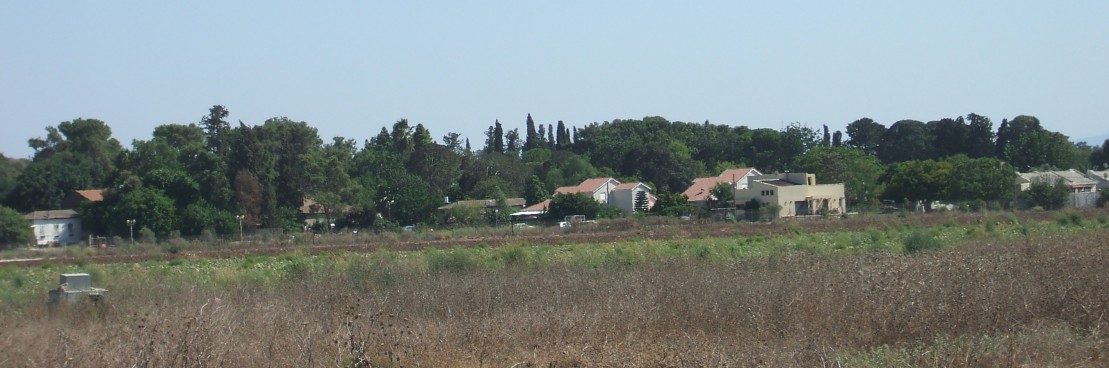
- Etymology: Petrel
- Location within Northwest Israel Location within Israel
- Coordinates: 32°54′2″N 35°9′58″E
- Country: Israel
- District: Northern
- Subdistrict: Acre
- Council: Mateh Asher
- Affiliation: Kibbutz Movement
- Founded: 1949
- Founder: Hungarian Jews
- Population (2024): 853
- Website: www.yassur.org.il

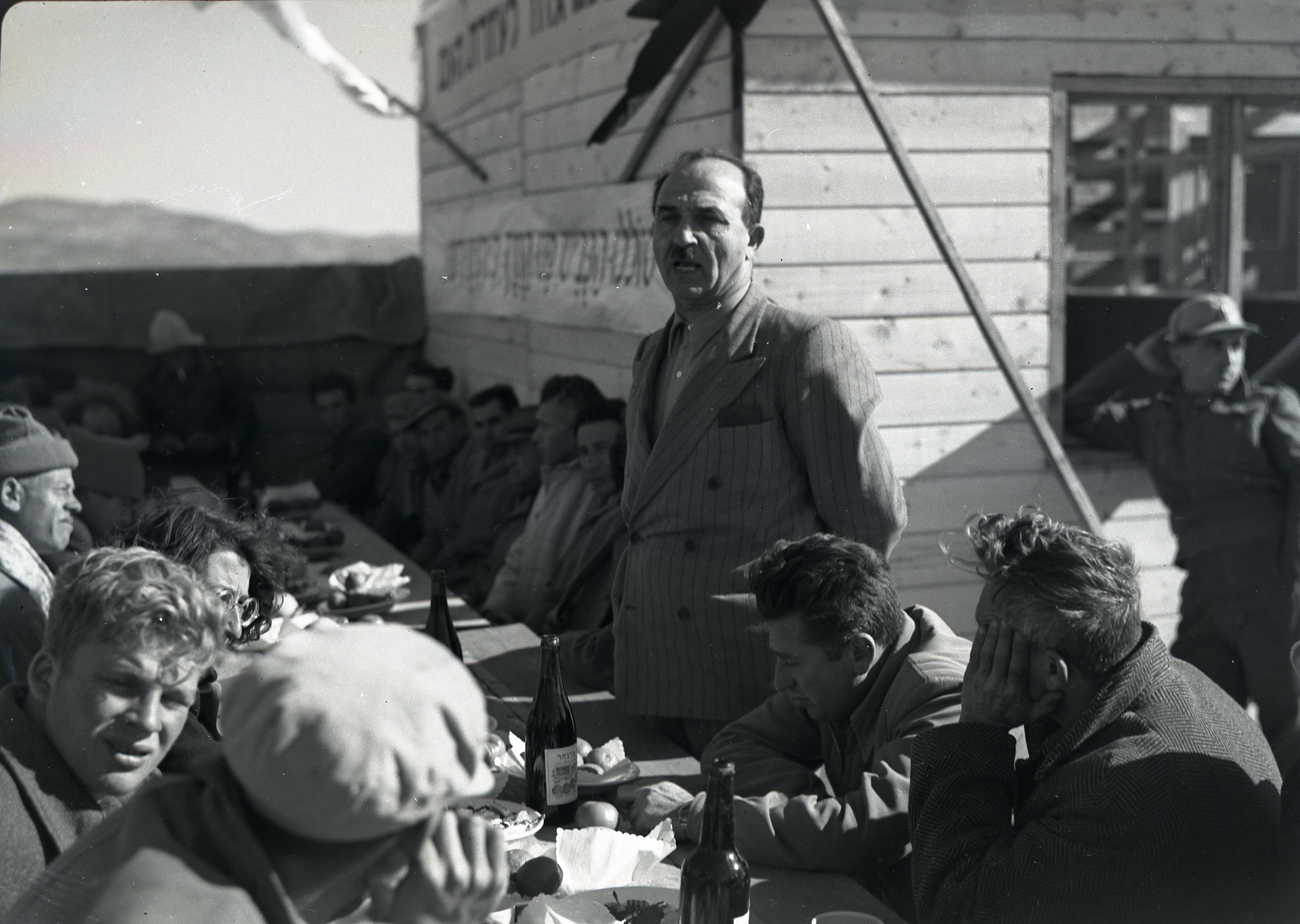
Establishment of Kibbutz Yas'ur, 1949; speaker - Levi Eshkol

Yas'ur (Hebrew: יַסְעוּר, lit. petrel) is a kibbutz in northern Israel. Located east of Acre in the Western Galilee, it falls under the jurisdiction of Mateh Asher Regional Council. In 2024 it had a population of 853.

== History ==
The kibbutz was established in 1949 by Jewish immigrants from Hungary who were members of the Zionist Socialist youth movement Hashomer Hatzair; they were joined in 1951 by another group of immigrants from England and in 1956 by another group from Brazil. The kibbutz is named after the seabird Yas'ur (petrel), symbolising the wishes of the founders to engage in fishing. The parents of Israeli historian Benny Morris were among the founders of the kibbutz, shortly after his birth.

The kibbutz was established on the land of the depopulated former Palestinian village of Al-Birwa, and it uses the land of the former villages of Al-Damun and Al-Ruways for agriculture.

Yasur's economy was based on textile and toy factories, which became unprofitable and closed down. In 2003 the kibbutz began a process of renewal and launched a successful membership drive. An Italian restaurant, Liliana's, is located on the grounds of the kibbutz.

== Notable people ==
- Lynne Reid Banks
- Benny Morris
