= Giovanni Mariti =

Italian traveler (1736-1806)

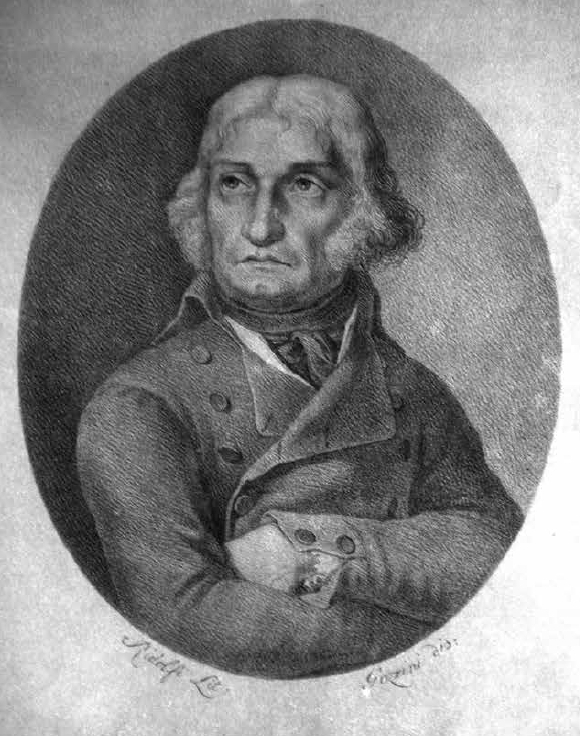
- Born: November 4, 1736; Florence, Italy
- Died: September 13, 1806 (aged 69); Florence, Italy

Giovanni Mariti (Florence, 4 November 1736 – Florence, 13 September 1806) was an Italian scientist, historian, and traveler. His father was Marcantonio di Luigi, a chancellor, and his mother was Alessandra Moriani. Mariti lost his father at an early age and so was raised by his stepfather, Calvani, a merchant from Volterra, who moved the family to the port city of Livorno.

Livorno was a bustling, international port and it was here that Mariti first developed an interest in the study of natural science. This environment also facilitated his acquisition of English and French languages through interactions with foreigners, particularly those from Britain.

The continuous flow of merchants and diplomats from various European nations and the Levant through Livorno port exposed Mariti to a multitude of languages and cultures, which stimulated him to study and gave him a wide perspective over the rest of the world.

In 1760, Mariti began his travels, with a journey to Cyprus where he initially worked for an English merchant. His first destination in the Levant was Acre, Palestine, where he spent two years serving as a procurator and commercial agent for the English company Wasson. Following this, he returned to Cyprus and settled in Larnaca as an employee of the English consul, Timothy Turner, who also held the position of vice-consul representing the Grand Duke of Tuscany.

Mariti's favorable relationship with Consul Turner led to his appointment as the chancellor of the consulate, succeeding Antonio Mondaini (who was also from Livorno). During his seven-year stay on Cyprus, Mariti undertook extensive travels throughout the island, meticulously documenting his observations of the local environment and culture.

Mariti's role as a consular official, his previous metropolitan exposure and extended residence offered him a distinctive vantage point for deeply observing and recording the intricacies of the local societies, economies, and political landscapes of both Cyprus and the wider Levant. This prolonged period of engagement allowed him to gather insights that went beyond the superficial encounters of typical travelers or pilgrims. His official capacity would have given access to local authorities, diplomatic circles, and a broader spectrum of social interactions, enriching his understanding of the region in ways that would have been inaccessible to many others.

In the scientific domain, Mariti had a focus on natural history. He compiled a significant herbarium, a collection of dried plant specimens, which later attracted the attention of the botanist C. Ridolfi after Mariti’s death. He actively contributed to the newly established Physics and Natural History Museum in Florence (founded in 1775) by sending news, books, and natural specimens that he had gathered during his travels. His work in the field of agronomy, led to his election as a corresponding member of the prestigious Accademia dei Georgofili in 1772. His published works include "Del vino di Cipro" (On the Wine of Cyprus). He also authored "Della Robbia. Sua Coltivazione e suoi Usi" ("On Madder. Its Cultivation and Uses"), a specialized treatise on the madder plant (Rubia tinctorum) and its important application as a source of red dye. He also engaged in correspondence with the renowned Swedish botanist from Uppsala, Carl Peter Thunberg and had knowledge of Turkish and Arabic languages. His expertise in both botany and hygiene later contributed to his work as an agronomist in Tuscany. His writings on agronomy specifically examined the agricultural practices prevalent in Tuscany and their associated social structures.

Mauriti’s observational skills, empathy with his subjects and scientific inclinations gave his travel writings a human touch combined with scientific credibility. He had read previous writers but relies almost entirely on his own understanding. His translator Claude Delaval Cobham finds him "observant and conscientious". His scientific essays were characterized by an intent to convey technical information to a wider, non-specialist audience.

Mariti's time in the Levant was a major source of inspiration for his literary output, which included both historical analyses and detailed travel accounts. His most substantial work, "Viaggi per l'isola di Cipro e per la Soria e Palestina fatti dall'anno 1760 al 1768" a nine-volume chorographic study published between 1769 and 1776, contained his initial historical observations on the regions he explored. He also wrote more focused historical works, such as "Istoria della guerra accesa nella Soria l'anno 1771 dall'armi di Aly-Bey dell'Egitto" and "Istoria della guerra della Soria proseguita sino alla fine di Aly-Bey dell'Egitto," about the rebellion of Ali Bey in Egypt and Syria.

In 1781, he published "Memorie istoriche di Monaco de' Corbizzi fiorentino Patriarca di Gerusalemme", a biographical work focused on Aymar the Monk, a Florentine who became Archbishop of Caesarea, Palestine (1181 until 1194) and then Latin Patriarch of Jerusalem (1194 until 1202).

"Cronologia de' Re latini di Gerusalemme" was published in 1784, and in 1787 "Dissertazione istorico-critica sull'antica città di Citium" a topography of ancient Kition (Citium, near Larnaca), a further contribution by Mariti to the history and archaeology of the Levant.

In 1787, Mariti also published "Istoria di Faccardino, grand'emir de' Drusi", a work which chronicled the life of the Druze leader Fakhr al-Dīn II.

Upon his return to Florence in 1768, Mariti joined the Florentine Tribunale di Sanità (health board). His expertise in public health led to his appointment as lieutenant in 1782, and then in 1784 as captain of the Lazzaretto di S. Jacopo (quarantine station) in Livorno. In this capacity, he was responsible for overseeing the health system of Livorno. Drawing upon his direct experience with the plague during his travels in Palestine and Syria, he contributed to the reform of leprosy hospitals in Tuscany and the implementation of measures to contain the devastating yellow fever outbreak in Livorno in 1804.

Returning to Florence in 1790, Mariti assumed various administrative roles, including the reorganizing the Archivio delle Reali Possessioni (Archive of the Royal Possessions) and his final post of Archivio della Camera delle Comunità (Archive of the Chamber of Communities), where he served until his death from apoplexy on 13 September 1806.

Mariti was married twice - first in 1776 to Teresa Bonacchi, with whom he had three daughters and a son. In 1791, when his first wife died, he married Anna Gargani, from whom he separated after having a daughter who died prematurely.

== General references ==
- Natali Giulio, 1950, "Storia Letteraria d'Italia", Milano, (Vallardi, pp. 449, 631)
- Salmeri Giovanni, 2001, "Domenico Sestini. Il museo del principe di Biscari", Catania", (Maimone, pp. 9–53)
- Tondo Luigi, 1990, "Domenico Sestini e il medagliere mediceo", Firenze, (Olschki, pp. 14, 30, 47, 53-55, 57, 65, 101, 199, 237, 351)
- Venturi Francesco, 1969-1990, "Settecento Riformatore", Torino, (Einaudi; vol. III, pp. 106 – 107)
- Pasta Renato, 2007, Mariti, in Dizionario biografico degli italiani, Treccani, vol. 70
- Bombardieri Luca, 2012, "Viaggi e studi del georgofilo Giovanni Mariti nel Levante e a Cipro (1760-1768)", I Georgofili. Atti dell’Accademia dei Georgofili, Serie VIII, Vol. 8, Tomo II (2012), pp. 747–768.

== Works in English ==
- Mariti, G. (1792). Travels Through Cyprus, Syria, and Palestine; with a General History of the Levant. Vol. 1. Dublin: P. Byrne.
- Mariti, G. (1792). Travels Through Cyprus, Syria, and Palestine; with a General History of the Levant. Vol. 2. Dublin: P. Byrne.
