= Israel Exploration Journal =

Journal

- Discipline: Archaeology, Middle Eastern studies
- Language: English

Publication details
- History: 1950–present
- Publisher: Israel Exploration Society (Israel)
- Frequency: Biannual

Standard abbreviations
- ISO 4: Isr. Explor. J.

Indexing
- ISSN: 0021-2059

The Israel Exploration Journal is a biannual academic journal which has been published by the Israel Exploration Society since 1950. It primarily covers research in archaeology, but also history and geography relating to Israel and the surrounding areas. The editors-in-chief are Shmuel Ahituv, Amihai Mazar, and Z. Weiss. The journal is abstracted and indexed in the Arts & Humanities Citation Index and Current Contents/Arts & Humanities.
