= Pierre Jacotin =

French geographer (1765–1827)

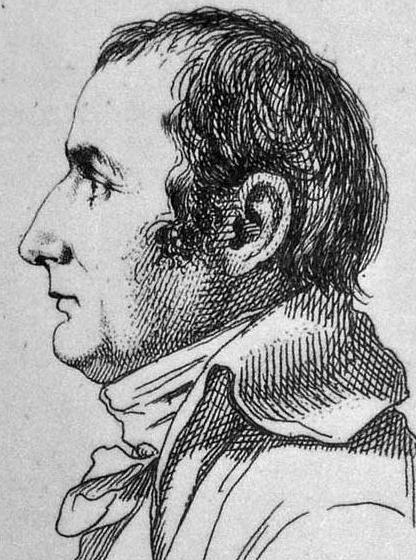

Jacotin's 1799 survey of Egypt and Palestine, as a composite, published in 1818 (Carte geographique de l'Egypte et des pays environnans. Reduite d'apres la Carte topographique levee pendant l'expedition de l'Armee francaise)

Pierre Jacotin (1765–1827) was the director of the survey for the Carte de l'Égypte (Description de l'Égypte), the first triangulation-based map of Egypt, Syria and Palestine.

The maps were drafted in 1799–1800 during Napoleon‘s campaign in Egypt and Palestine.

After his return from Egypt, Jacotin worked on preparing the maps for publication, but in 1808 Napoleon formally declared them state secrets, apparently connected to Napoleon's efforts to establish an alliance with the Ottomans. The engraved plates were not published until 1828–1830.

== Bibliography ==
- Khatib, Hisham (2003). Palestine and Egypt Under the Ottomans: Paintings, Books, Photographs, Maps and Manuscripts. I. B. Tauris. ISBN 1-860-64888-6.
