= Beit Netofa Valley =

Valley in Israel

Coordinates: 32°48′34.44″N 35°19′56.86″E

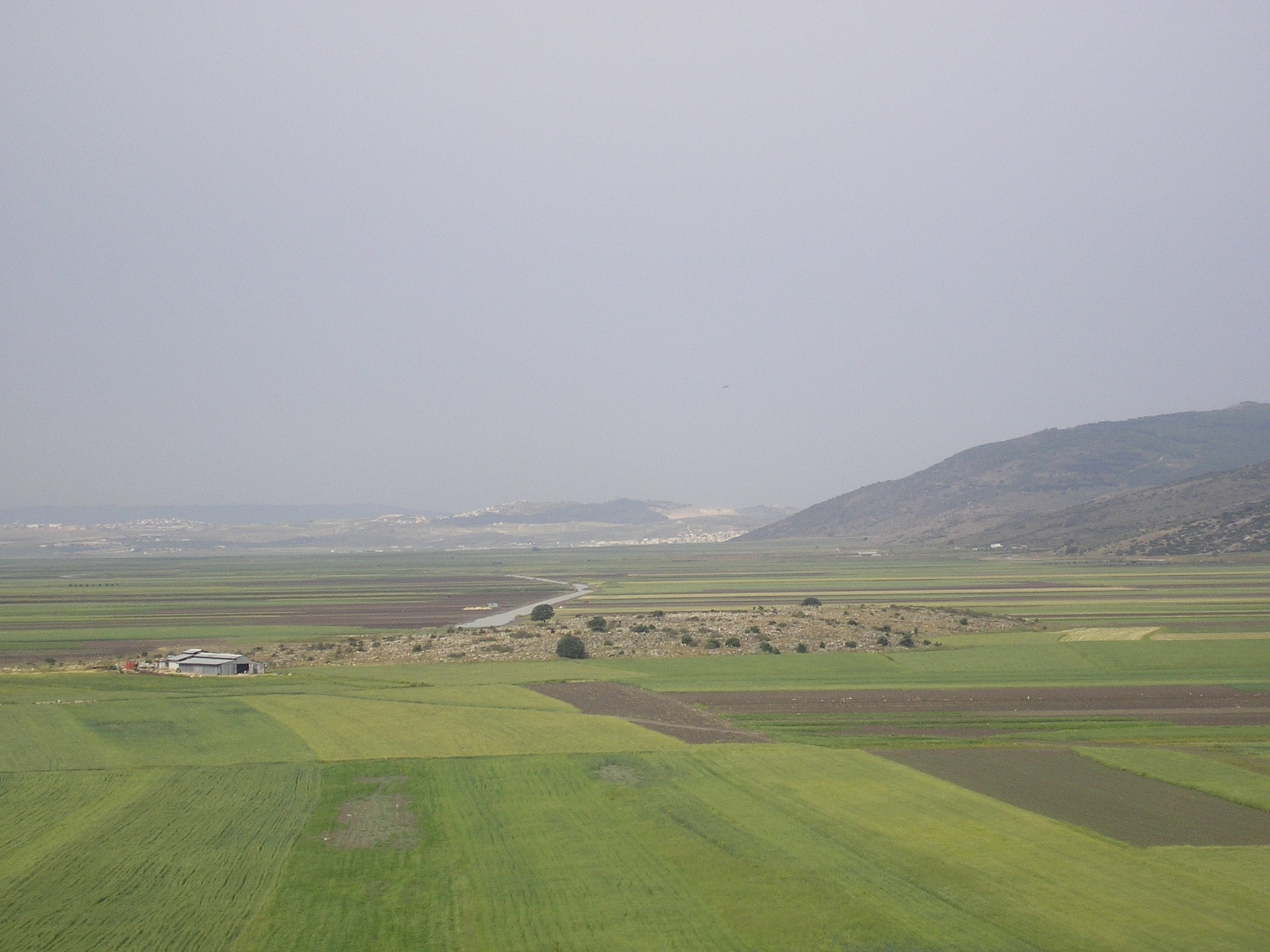
Sahl al-Battuf

The Beit Netofa Valley, or Sahl al-Battuf (Hebrew: בקעת בית נטופה, Arabic: سهل البطوف) is a valley in the Lower Galilee region of Israel, midway between Tiberias and Haifa. Covering 46 km^{2}, it is the largest valley in the mountainous part of the Galilee and one of the largest in the southern Levant.

== Etymology ==
The name Beit Netofa Valley first appears in the Mishna (Shevi'it 9:5) and later in medieval rabbinical literature, receiving its name from the Roman-era Jewish settlement of Beth Netofa which stood at its northeastern edge. The valley's Arabic name is Sahl ˀal-Baṭūf and as such appears as Vallée Battof in crusader documents.

== Geography and climate ==
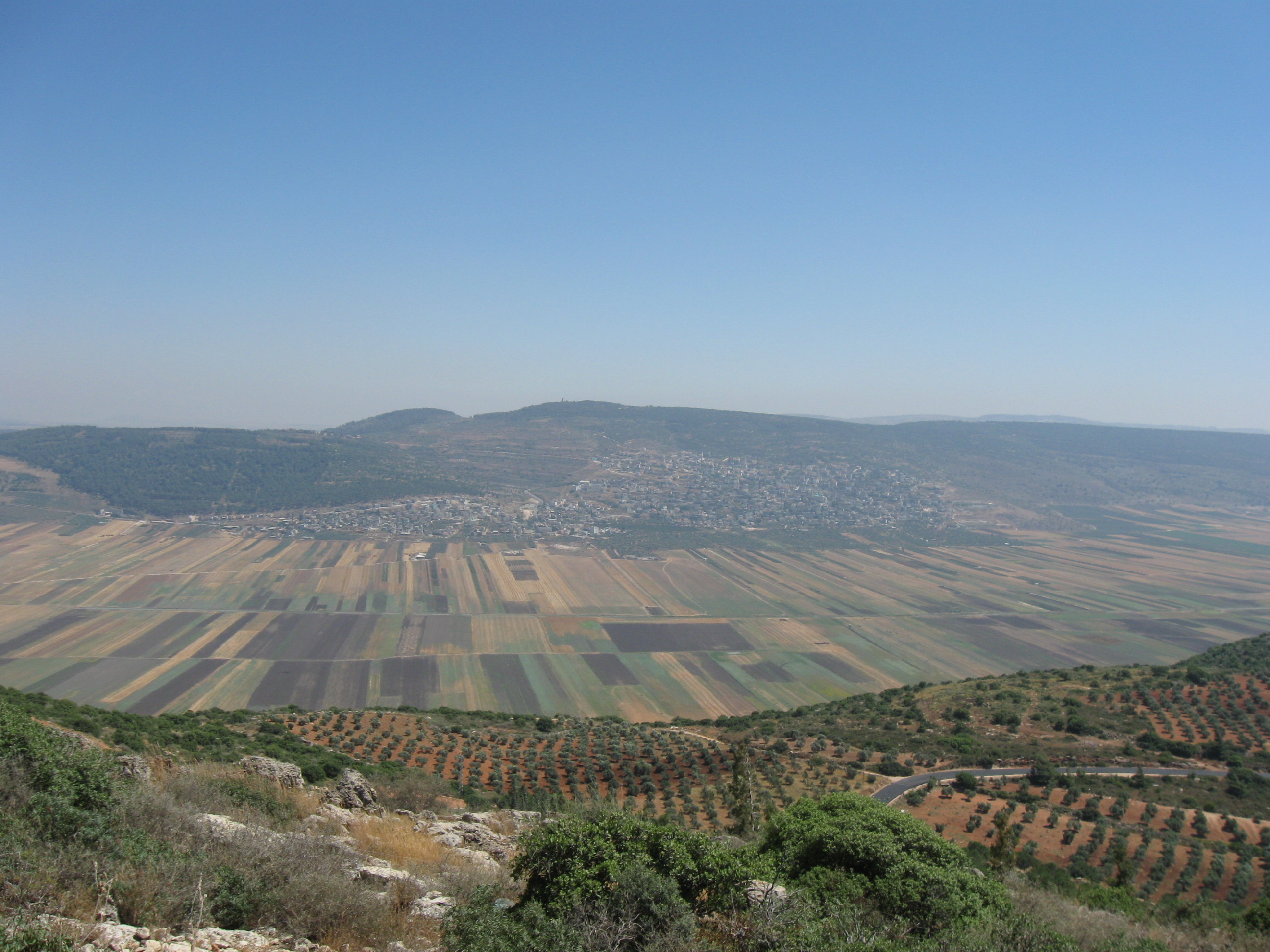
Beit Netofa valley

The valley is 16 km long and on average 3 km wide, a graben formed by two parallel east–west trending faults running to its north and south. It lies between two horsts forming the Yodfat range to the north and the Tur'an range to the south, basically separating the heart of the Galilee from Nazareth area. Limestone hills to the east indicate the valley was also shaped by karstic processes. Long and narrow and ringed by steep hills, the valley soil is fatty clay relatively impermeable to water, leading to seasonal winter flooding, a phenomenon already described in the 14th century by medieval Arab geographer Al-Dimashqi.

On February 7, 1950, a meteorological station in the valley recorded the lowest temperature ever recorded in Israel: -13.7 °C. This extreme remained unsurpassed for over half a century in Israeli records until 2015, when the Golan Heights experienced -14.2° C.

=== Settlements ===
As the valley floor is set under water by winter rains, and due to its high agricultural value, villages have only been established at the margins of the valley, where the terrain starts rising. These are, from west to east, Kibbutz Hanaton, Kafr Manda, Rumana, Uzeir, Bu'eine Nujeidat and Eilabun. The Jewish religious community settlement of Mitzpe Netofa overlooks the valley from Mount Tur'an, which separates the Beit Netofa and Tur'an valleys.

The fertile valley land is used for agriculture and is largely owned and cultivated by the inhabitants of settlements either in the valley itself, or from nearby areas. The latter category includes inhabitants of the Arab settlements of Sakhnin, Arraba and Bi'ina, and of the Jewish settlements of Yodfat, Zippori and Kibbutz HaSolelim.

=== National Water Carrier ===
The Beit Netofa Canal, a part of Israel's National Water Carrier, runs through the valley. The 17-kilometer-long open canal was built with an oval base due to the clay soil. The width of the canal is 19.4 meters, the bottom is 12 meters wide and it is 2.60 meters deep. At the southwestern edge of the Beit Netofa Valley it reaches the two Eshkol reservoirs, where the water is cleaned and tested before flowing south towards the Negev.

=== Archaeological sites ===
Several archaeological sites litter the valley. The earliest, Netofa I and II, date from the Chalcolithic period and are found on its hilly western flank near Kafr Manda. The assemblages found at the sites are rich in flint artifacts and tools and include bifacial tools, scrapers, sickle blades and retouched blades. Finds also include an arrow head and pottery. The sites are farming villages of a size and richness previously unknown in the Chalcolithic Galilee.

Two tells stand on the valley floor. The first is Tel Hanaton (Tell Bedeiwiyeh), which occupies roughly 5 hectares and dominates the western end of the valley. Hanaton has been identified as the Hinnatuni of the Amarna letters, and according to the Bible, it and the surrounding regions fell under the control of the tribe of Zebulun. The second tell, Tell el-Wayiwat, is 0.4 hectares in size and rises 3.5 meters above the valley floor at its eastern edge. Two seasons of excavations were carried out at the site in 1986 and 1987 by Beth Alpert Nakhai, J.P. Dessel and Bonnie L. Wisthoff on behalf of the University of Arizona, the William F. Albright Institute of Archaeological Research and the American Schools of Oriental Research. These have revealed five major strata, dating from the Middle Bronze Age through to the 11th century BCE, in the Iron Age.

At the valley's northeastern edge stands the site of ancient Beth Netofa, its name preserved in the Arab place name, Khirbet Natif. It shows signs of habitation from the Iron Age through the Persian and Roman periods and up to medieval times. Nearby, next to Highway 65 that runs along the eastern edge of the valley, lies Hurvat Amudim, another Roman-era Jewish settlement. Khirbet Qana, on the north edge of the valley, has long been recognized as the biblical Cana of Galilee, the site of Jesus' first miracle (John 2:11).

== See also ==
- Al-Batuf Regional Council
