= Arraba, Israel =

Arraba: עראבה; عرّابة
- City (from 2016)

Hebrew transcription(s)
  - ISO 259: ʕarrabba
  - Also spelled: Arrabe (official) 'Arrabat-Batuf (unofficial)
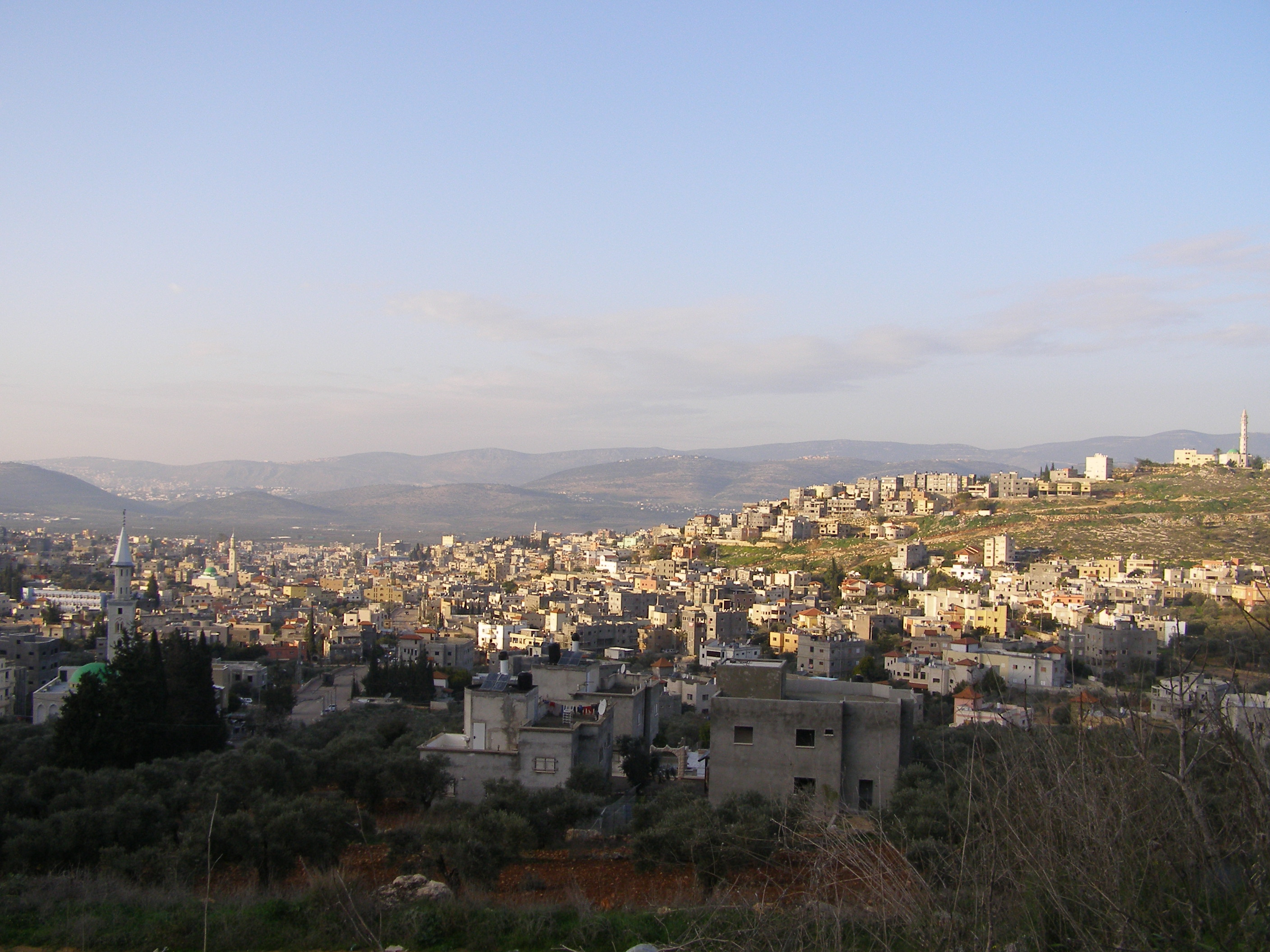
- Skyline of Arraba, 2011

- Location within Northwest Israel Location within Israel
- Coordinates: 32°51′2″N 35°20′20″E
- Grid position: 181/250 PAL
- Country: Israel
- District: Northern
- Subdistrict: Acre
- Natural Region: Shefar'am

Government
  - Head of Municipality: Ahmad Nassar

Area
  - Total: 8,250 dunams (8.25 km^{2}; 3.19 sq mi)

Population (2024)
  - Total: 27,175
  - Density: 3,290/km^{2} (8,530/sq mi)

Ethnicity
  - Arabs: 99.9%
  - Others: 0.1%
- Name meaning: The steppe or plateau of the Buttauf

Arraba (Hebrew: עראבה; Arabic: عرّابة), also known as 'Arrabat al-Battuf, is an Arab city in Israel. It is located in the Lower Galilee in the Northern District, within Sakhnin valley, adjacent to Sakhnin and Deir Hanna, and climbing a bit on Yodfat range to its south, while also owning some lands south of that in the Beit Netofa Valley (Sahl al-Battuf) to the north of Nazareth area. Arraba attained local council status in 1965, and city status in 2016. In 2024, its population was 27,175. In 2022, 98.8% of the population was Muslim and 1.2% was Christian.

During the Roman period, Arraba was a Jewish settlement known as Arab or Gabara, and was home to the priestly family of Petahiah. In the fifth or sixth century CE, it was inhabited by Christians, as evidenced by the discovery of a church. The Arab Muslim tribe of Zayadina arrived in Arraba in the middle of the 17th century and later gained control of the town. In the 18th century, Daher al-Umar, an autonomous ruler of Galilee, lived in Arraba. In the late Ottoman period, the town had a sizable Christian minority, but since then, many have emigrated to Haifa, leaving only a small number of Christian households in the predominantly Muslim city.

== History ==
=== Antiquity ===
Arraba is identified with the ancient Jewish village called Arab, mentioned in Josephus' writings by its pronunciation in the Greek, Gabara, but in the Mishnah and the Jerusalem Talmud as Arab. The first-century Jewish rabbi and leader Yohanan ben Zakkai is said to have lived there eighteen years. During the First Jewish-Roman War, Vespasian sacked the city, killing those of its Jewish citizens who had not already fled. The place is presumed to have been resettled by Jews in the third-fourth centuries, since the town is mentioned as being the place of residence of one of the priestly courses known as Pethahiah, as inscribed in the Caesarea Inscription.

Arabba is home to the grave of Hanina ben Dosa, a Jewish scholar who lived in the village during the first and second generations after the destruction of the Second Temple.

In the 5th or 6th century CE, there were Christians living here, as witnessed by a church whose mosaic floor and inscription have been unearthed. The church was destroyed either at the end of the 6th century or the beginning of the 7th century.

The oldest settled section of Arraba lies at the village's south-east side, near the Christian church. Archaeological artefacts have been discovered there dating back to the Roman and Byzantine periods.

=== Middle Ages ===
In the Crusader era, it was known as Arabiam. In 1174, it was one of the casalia (villages) given to Phillipe le Rous. In 1236, descendants of Phillipe le Rous confirmed the sale of the fief of Arraba. In 1250, it was one of the casalia belonging to the Teutonic knights, a Crusader order.

In the 13th century, Arrabah is mentioned by Syrian geographer Yaqut al-Hamawi in his famous work Mu'jam al-Buldān (1224–1228), as a "place in the province of Acca".

=== Ottoman Empire ===
The village was incorporated into the Ottoman Empire in 1517 with all of Palestine, and in 1596 Arraba appeared in the tax registers as being in the Nahiya ("Subdistrict") of Tabariyya, part of Sanjak Safad. It had an all Muslim population of 125 households and 2 bachelors. The villagers paid a fixed tax rate of 20% on wheat, barley, summer crops or fruit trees, cotton, and goats or beehives; a total of 11,720 akçe. 1/4 of the revenue went to a waqf.

At some point in the mid-17th century the Zayadina, an Arab Muslim tribe, moved to Arraba. Its sheikh later acquired control of the town and its district after wresting control of the area from the Druze sheikh of Sallama. Sallama and other Druze villages in the vicinity were subsequently destroyed, Druze suzerainty over the Shaghur district came to an end and the Zayadina consequently gained significant influence in the area, including the role of tax collector of Shaghur on behalf of the Ottoman wali ("governor") of Sidon Province. Arraba became home to Daher al-Umar, a later sheikh of the Zayadina tribe. A building said to be the home of Daher is still standing.

In 1838, Arabeh was noted as a Muslim and Christian village in the Esh-Shagur district, located between Safad, Acca and Tiberias.

In 1875 Victor Guérin found Arrabah to have 900 Muslim inhabitants and 100 Greek-Orthodox Christians. In 1881, the PEF's Survey of Western Palestine (SWP) described Arrabet al Buttauf as "A large stone-built village, containing about 1,000 Moslems and Christians, and surrounded by groves of olives and arable land. Water is obtained from a large birkeh and cisterns. This was the place where Dhaher el Amr´s family was founded, and was long occupied by them."

A population list from about 1887 showed that Arrabet had 970 inhabitants; about 80% Muslim and 20% Catholic Christians.

=== British Mandate ===
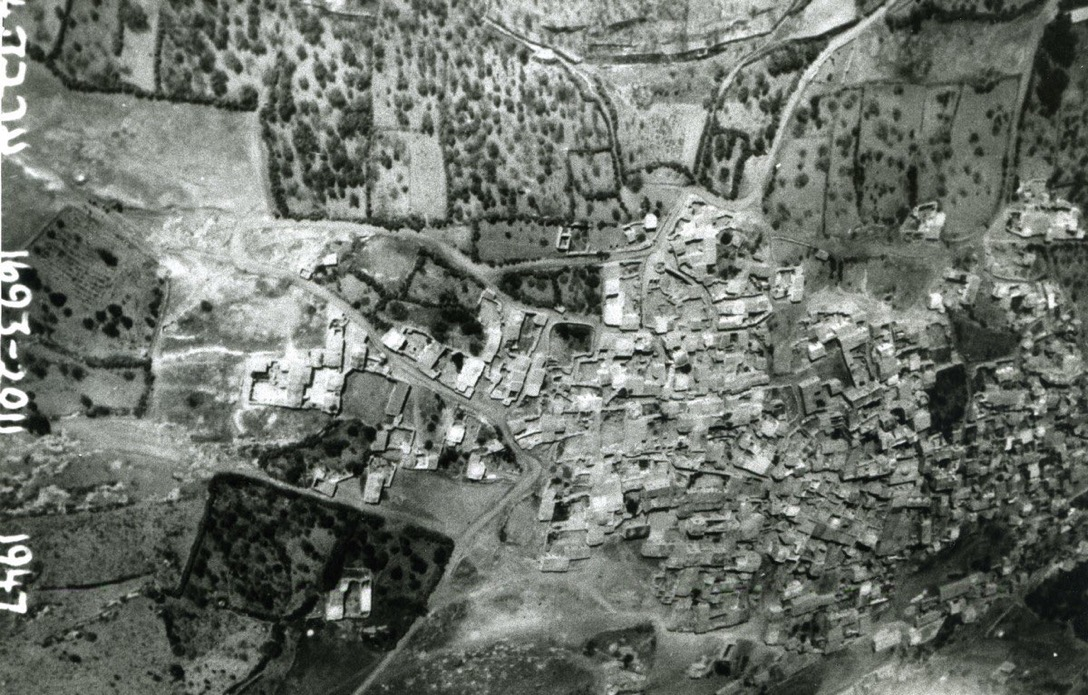
Arraba 1947 from Palmach archives

In the 1922 census of Palestine, conducted by the British Mandate authorities, Arrabeh had a population of 984 people, of which 937 were Muslim and 47 were Christian. Among the Christians, 42 were Melkite, 4 Orthodox and one was Anglican. At the time of the 1931 census, Arraba had 253 occupied houses and a population of 1187 Muslims and 37 Christians.

In the 1945 statistics the population was 1,800; 1,740 Muslims and 60 Christians, with 30,852 dunams (a dunam is a unit of area equivalent to 1000 square metres or one-tenth of a hectare) of land, according to an official land and population survey. 3,290 dunams were used for plantations and irrigable land, 14,736 dunams for cereals, while 140 dunams were built-up (urban) land.

=== Israel ===
==== 20th century ====
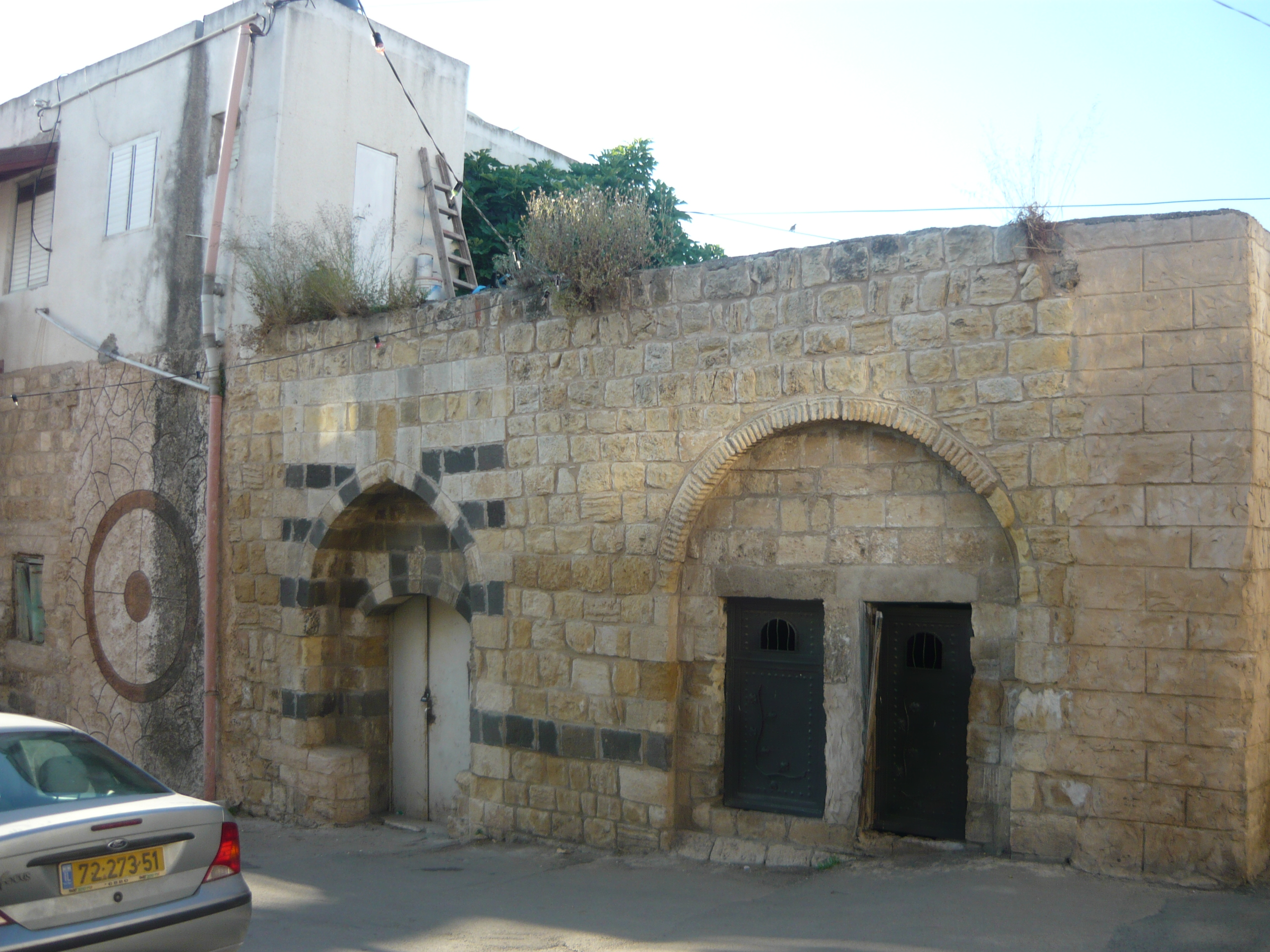
House of the family of Zahir al-'Umar (Dhaher el-Omar)

In 1948, during Operation Hiram (October 29–31), the town surrendered to the advancing Israeli army. Many of the inhabitants fled but some remained. Arraba became a local council in 1965. The village remained under Martial Law until 1966.

Arraba was home to the first Land Day demonstrations in 1976 demanding the state of Israel to stop the expropriation of Palestinian Arab lands. Together with Sakhnin and Deir Hanna, it formed what is called the triangle of Land Day. Israel's reaction to control the protest was forceful and six people were killed by Israeli police. The reason for the Land Day follows:

On March 11, 1976, the Israeli government published an expropriation plan including lands in the Galilee. It affected some 20,000 dunams of land between the Arab villages of Sakhnin and Arraba. The land was said to be used for security purposes but was also used to build new Jewish settlements. David McDowall identifies the resumption of land seizures in the Galilee and the acceleration of land expropriations in the West Bank in the mid-1970s as the immediate catalyst for both the Land Day demonstration and similar demonstrations that were taking place contemporaneously in the West Bank. He writes: "Nothing served to bring the two Palestinian communities together politically more than the question of land."

==== 21st century ====
Arraba became a city in 2016. In the late 2010s, Arraba native and Harvard graduate, Nuseir Yassin, gained international acclaim with his Nas Daily videos. In one of the chapters he invites the entire State of Israel to visit his parental home in Arraba.

== Economy ==
The symbol of the local council is an onion, a watermelon and a cantaloupe which symbolize the crops for which Arraba is famous. Throughout history Arraba was mostly an agricultural village depending mainly on the al-Batuf Plain (Hebrew name: Beit Netofa Valley) to grow crops. However, currently the dependence on agriculture is declining rapidly due to the rise in population, urbanization and a subsequently more modern lifestyle.

== Demographics ==
Historical population
Year	Pop.	±%
1972	6,300	—
1983	9,700	+54.0%
1995	14,600	+50.5%
2008	20,600	+41.1%
2022	26,119	+26.8%
2024	27,175	+4.0%

== Landmarks ==
Arraba houses the tomb of Hanina Ben Dosa, a Jewish scholar and miracle worker who lived in the first century CE. It is known to locals as "maqam as-Siddiq".

Arraba is also home to the shrine of ash-Sheikh Dabus, attributed to a Sufi sheikh from the 17th century by local tradition. Alternative traditions suggest the shrine is associated with the family of Zahir al-Umar, or a commander from Saladin's army. The ash-Sheikh Dabus shrine is located 50 meters away from Hanina Ben Dosa's tomb, within the cemetery belonging to the Na'amneh and Hatib families.

In the 1870s, Guerin saw the mosque which he thought had probably once been a church on the basis of its east–west orientation. Inside there were two monolithic columns which he took as further proof of its antiquity.

Andrew Petersen, an archaeologist specializing in Islamic architecture, surveyed the place in 1994, and found several interesting buildings. The modern-day mosque was built in 1953 on the site of an older building. Opposite the mosque is a palatial house with an ablaq entrance made of black and white masonry. This is the house associated with the family of Zahir al-'Umar/Dhaher el-Omar.

== Sports ==
The town's football club Ahva Arraba dissolved in 2019 due to debts. It was replaced by a new club, Hapoel Arraba.

== Voting Patterns ==
In the 2022 election, 98 percent of voters in Arraba voted for the Arab parties, while 1 percent voted for the parties of the center-left coalition led by Yair Lapid and 0.4 percent voted for the parties of the right-wing coalition led by Benjamin Netanyahu. Among the voters for the Arab parties, 45 percent voted for the Hadash–Ta'al list, while 29 percent voted for Ra'am and 26 percent voted for Balad.

In the 2026 election, 98 percent of voters in Arraba voted for the Arab parties, while 1 percent voted for the parties of the center-left coalition led by Gadi Eisenkot and 0.2 percent voted for the parties of the right-wing coalition led by Benjamin Netanyahu. Among the voters for the Arab parties, 72 percent voted for the Joint List, while 28 percent voted for Ra'am. Voter turnout increased 57 percent from the 2022 election.

== Notable people ==
- Asel Asleh, young peace activist killed during the Second Intifada
- Ali Nassar (born 1954), film director
- Nuseir Yassin, travel video blogger- also called NAS Daily

== See also ==
- Arab localities in Israel
- F.C. Bnei Arraba
- Land Day
- House demolition in the Israeli–Palestinian conflict

== Bibliography ==
- Avi-Yonah, M. (1964). "The Caesarea Inscription of the Twenty-Four Priestly Courses". Eretz-Israel: Archaeological, Historical and Geographical Studies (in Hebrew). L.A. Mayer Memorial Volume (1895–1959). JSTOR 23614642.
- Barron, J.B., ed. (1923). Palestine: Report and General Abstracts of the Census of 1922. Government of Palestine.
- Conder, C.R.; Kitchener, H.H. (1881). The Survey of Western Palestine: Memoirs of the Topography, Orography, Hydrography, and Archaeology. Vol. 1. London: Committee of the Palestine Exploration Fund.
- Dauphin, C. (1998). La Palestine byzantine, Peuplement et Populations. BAR International Series 726 (in French). Vol. III : Catalogue. Oxford: Archeopress. ISBN 0-860549-05-4.
- Ellenblum, R. (2003). Frankish Rural Settlement in the Latin Kingdom of Jerusalem. Cambridge University Press. ISBN 9780521521871.
- Firro, Kais (1992). A History of the Druzes. Vol. 1. BRILL. ISBN 9004094377.
- Frankel, Rafael (1988). "Topographical notes on the territory of Acre in the Crusader period". Israel Exploration Journal. 38 (4): 249–272.
- Government of Palestine, Department of Statistics (1945). Village Statistics, April, 1945.
- Guérin, V. (1880). Description Géographique Historique et Archéologique de la Palestine (in French). Vol. 3: Galilee, pt. 1. Paris: L'Imprimerie Nationale.
- Hadawi, S. (1970). Village Statistics of 1945: A Classification of Land and Area ownership in Palestine. Palestine Liberation Organization Research Center.
- HaReuveni, Immanuel (1999). Lexicon of the Land of Israel (in Hebrew). Miskal - Yedioth Ahronoth Books and Chemed Books. ISBN 965-448-413-7.
- Hütteroth, W.-D.; Abdulfattah, K. (1977). Historical Geography of Palestine, Transjordan and Southern Syria in the Late 16th Century. Erlanger Geographische Arbeiten, Sonderband 5. Erlangen, Germany: Vorstand der Fränkischen Geographischen Gesellschaft. ISBN 3-920405-41-2.
- Klausner, J. (1934). "Arraba". Qobetz (Journal of the Jewish Palestine Exploration Society) (in Hebrew). 3. Jerusalem: Jewish Palestine Exploration Society. OCLC 1166696291.
- Klein, S. (1909), Galiläa - Beiträge zur Geschichte und Geographie Galiläas (Contributions to the History and Geography of Galilee), Leipzig (in German)
- Klein, S. (1915), "Hebräische Ortsnamen bei Josephus" (Hebrew place names in Josephus), in: MGWJ (Monthly Journal for the History and Science of Judaism), vol. 59, Breslau (in German)
- Le Strange, G. (1890). Palestine Under the Moslems: A Description of Syria and the Holy Land from A.D. 650 to 1500. Committee of the Palestine Exploration Fund.
- Meyers, E.M. (1976), "Galilean Regionalism as a Factor in Historical Reconstruction," in: Bulletin of the American Schools of Oriental Research (No. 221)
- Mills, E., ed. (1932). Census of Palestine 1931. Population of Villages, Towns and Administrative Areas. Jerusalem: Government of Palestine.
- Morris, B. (1987). The Birth of the Palestinian refugee problem, 1947-1949. Cambridge University Press. ISBN 0-521-33028-9.
- Palmer, E.H. (1881). The Survey of Western Palestine: Arabic and English Name Lists Collected During the Survey by Lieutenants Conder and Kitchener, R. E. Transliterated and Explained by E.H. Palmer. Committee of the Palestine Exploration Fund.
- Petersen, Andrew (2001). A Gazetteer of Buildings in Muslim Palestine (British Academy Monographs in Archaeology). Vol. I. Oxford University Press. ISBN 978-0-19-727011-0.
- Rappaport, U. (2013). John of Gischala, from the mountains of Galilee to the walls of Jerusalem (in Hebrew). Vol. 1. Haifa: University of Haifa Press. ISBN 9789652272188. OCLC 646350156. (first printed in 2006)
- Rhode, H. (1979). Administration and Population of the Sancak of Safed in the Sixteenth Century (PhD). Columbia University. Archived from the original on 2020-03-01.
- Ribak, Eliya (2007). Religious Communities in Byzantine Palestina. Oxford: Archaeopress. ISBN 9781407300801. OCLC 238875853.
- Robinson, E.; Smith, E. (1841). Biblical Researches in Palestine, Mount Sinai and Arabia Petraea: A Journal of Travels in the year 1838. Vol. 3. Boston: Crocker & Brewster.
- Robinson, E. (1856). Later Biblical Researches in Palestine and in the Adjacent Regions - A Journal of Travels in the Year 1852. Boston: Crocker & Brewster.
- Röhricht, R. (1893). (RRH) Regesta regni Hierosolymitani (MXCVII-MCCXCI) (in Latin). Berlin: Libraria Academica Wageriana.
- Safrai, Z. (1985), The Galilee in the time of the Mishna and Talmud, 2nd edition, Jerusalem (in Hebrew) (OCLC 1000664189)
- Schumacher, G. (1888). "Population list of the Liwa of Akka". Quarterly Statement - Palestine Exploration Fund. 20: 169–191.
- Strehlke, E., ed. (1869). Tabulae Ordinis Theutonici ex tabularii regii Berolinensis codice potissimum. Berlin: Weidmanns.
- Tsafrir, Y.; Leah Di Segni; Judith Green (1994). (TIR): Tabula Imperii Romani: Judaea, Palaestina. Jerusalem: Israel Academy of Sciences and Humanities. ISBN 978-965-208-107-0.
- Zaharoni, Menahem [in Hebrew] (1978). "Arav". Israel Guide - Lower Galilee and Kinneret Region (A useful encyclopedia for the knowledge of the country) (in Hebrew). Vol. 3. Jerusalem: Keter Publishing House. OCLC 745203905.
