= Arab localities in Israel =

Arab towns and villages in the State of Israel

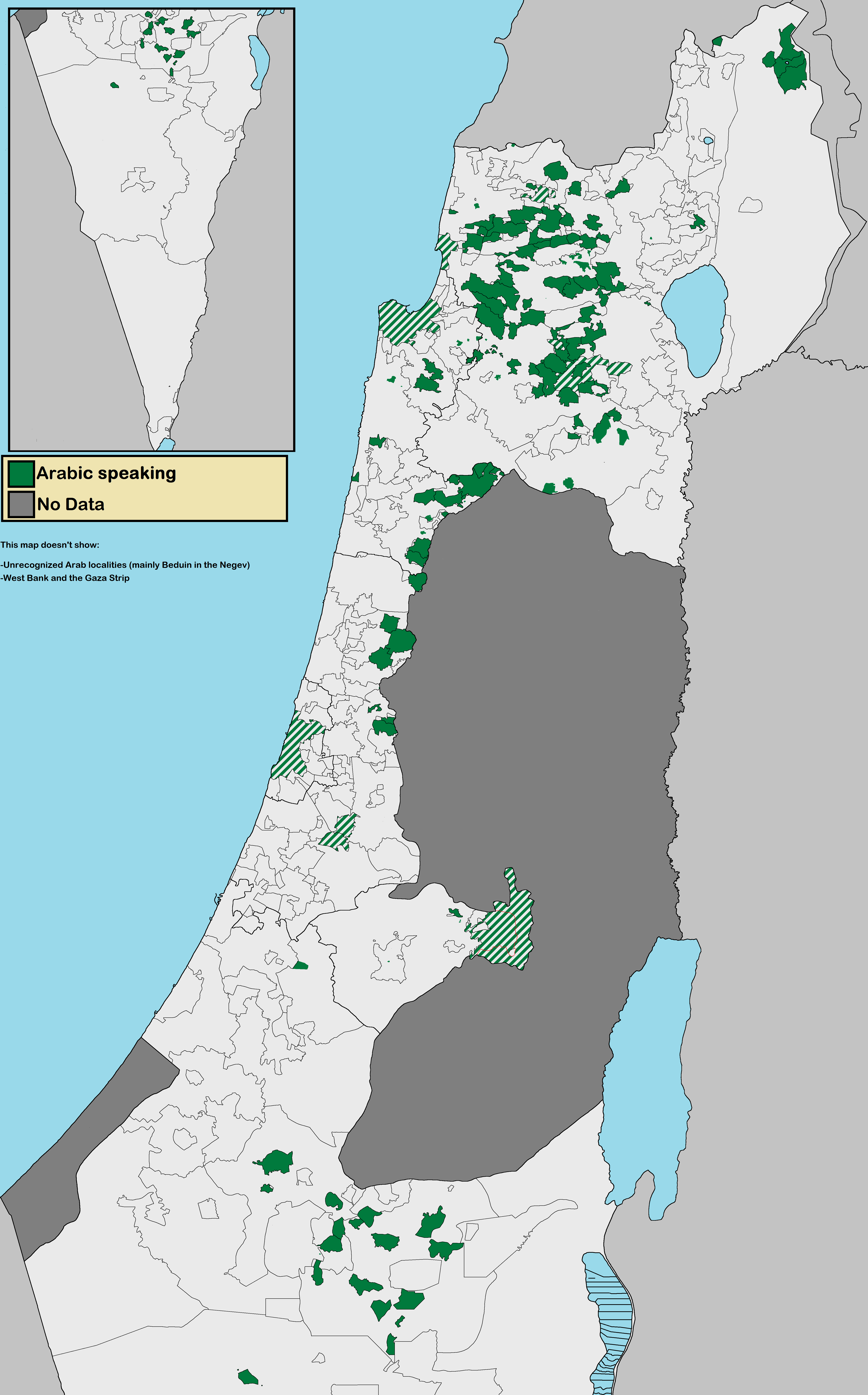
Map of Arabic speaking localities in Israel. This map includes East Jerusalem and Golan Heights, neither of which are internationally recognized parts of Israel.

Arab localities in Israel include all population centers with a 50% or higher Arab population in Israel. East Jerusalem and Golan Heights are not internationally recognized parts of Israel proper but have been included in this list.

According to the Israeli Central Bureau of Statistics census in 2010, "the Arab population lives in 134 towns and villages. About 44 percent of them live in towns (compared to 81 percent of the Jewish population); 48 percent live in villages with local councils (compared to 9 percent of the Jewish population). Four percent of the Arab citizens live in small villages with regional councils, while the rest live in unrecognized villages (the proportion is much higher, 31 percent in the Negev)". The Arab population in Israel is located in five main areas: Galilee (54.6% of total Israeli Arabs), Triangle (23.5% of total Israeli Arabs), Golan Heights, East Jerusalem, and Northern Negev (13.5% of total Israeli Arabs). Around 8.4% of Israeli Arabs live in officially mixed Jewish-Arab cities (excluding Arab residents in East Jerusalem), including Haifa, Lod, Ramle, Tel Aviv-Jaffa, Acre, Nof HaGalil, and Ma'alot Tarshiha.

In 2021, there were 163 localities in which all residents are Arab citizens of Israel, 69 of these are Arab local councils and 12 are Arab city councils. According to the Israel Democracy Institute about 49.1% of Israeli Arabs live in Arab local councils, 30.9% live in Arab city councils and 8.3% live in officially Mixed cities. Another 5.5% of Arab citizens live in 47 small localities that are incorporated into regional councils, 4.2% live in unrecognized villages (mostly in the Negev), and 1.8% live in cities with Jewish majority (including West Jerusalem). The percentages do not include East Jerusalem Arab residents.

The city of Acre has an Arab minority of 30.1%, while its Old City is 95% Arab. While Arabs constitute 11% of Haifa's total population, they make up 70% of Lower Haifa's residents. In 2011, Jaffa has an Arab population of 30.3%, Lod is 24.3% Arab, while Ramla is 22.2% Arab. In 2015, 23% of the population of Nof HaGalil was Arab.

According to Ha'aretz in 2015, only 16,000 Arabs are thought to be living in 16 localities not officially defined as mixed cities, or in Jewish neighborhoods of Haifa, Jerusalem and Tel Aviv. According to the Israel Central Bureau of Statistics, a sizeable percentage of Arabs lives in the Jewish majority cities of Eilat (5% Arab), Carmiel (4%), Qiryat Shemona (3%), Arad (3%), Beersheva (3%), Nahariyya (2%), Safed (2%) and Tiberias (2%).

== Central and Haifa Districts ==
158,900 Arabs live in the Central District, which has a total population of 1,931,000. 237,200 Arabs live in the Haifa District, which has a total population of 939,000.

The majority of the Arab population in these areas live along or near the Green Line which separates Israel from the West Bank in an area known as the "Triangle", split into the "Northern Triangle" (or Wadi Ara) and the "Southern Triangle".

There is a substantial Druze and Christian population in the Carmel region and the Wadi Nisnas neighborhood of Haifa.

=== Southern Triangle ===
Estimated population figures for 2024 are listed below.

- Jaljulia: 10,992
- Kafr Bara: 3,962
- Kafr Qasim: 27,996
- Qalansawe: 25,167
- Tayibe: 46,870
- Tira: 27,680
- Zemer: (Note: The result of a merger of the Arab villages of Yamma, Bir as-Sikka, Ibtan and Marja) 7,953

=== Northern Triangle ===
- Ar'ara (Note: Result of a merger between Ar'ara and 'Ara) 20,734
- Baqa al-Gharbiyye 31,275
- al-Arian 210
- Basma (Note: Result of a merger between Barta'a, Ein as-Sahala and Mu'awiya) 12,002
- Jatt 12,834
- Kafr Qara 21,066
- Ma'ale Iron (Note: Result of the merger of the Arab villages of Bayada, Musmus, Salim, Musheirifa and Zalafa) 15,486
- Meiser 1,952
- Umm al-Fahm 60,209
- Umm al-Qutuf 1,259

=== Lod ===
- Lod: 19,800 (estimated population figures for 2011)†

=== Ramla ===
- Ramla: 15,100 (Estimated population figures for 2011)†

=== Haifa and Carmel region ===
- Wadi Nisnas, Halisa, Kababir and Abbas (Haifa neighborhoods)†
- Daliyat al-Karmel☆
- Ein Hawd
- Fureidis
- Ibtin
- Isfiya☆†
- Jisr az-Zarqa
- Khawaled

† Significant presence of Christian population

☆ Significant presence of Druze population

== Tel Aviv District ==
18,500 Arabs live in the Tel Aviv District, which has a total population of 1,318,300. 16,000 of them live in Jaffa, where they make up around a third of the population. In 2019 the population of Tel Aviv-Jaffa was 89.9% Jewish, and 4.5% Arab; among Arabs, 82.8% were Muslim, 16.4% were Christian, and 0.8% were Druze.

== Jerusalem District ==
310,700 Arabs live in the Jerusalem District, which has a total population of 987,400. The Arab populations of the Jerusalem District are primarily concentrated in East Jerusalem, which is internationally not considered part of Israel, but there are four other towns that exist within the district's jurisdiction. Abu Ghosh is the largest of them.

=== West Jerusalem ===
- Abu Ghosh 8,848
- Beit Jimal
- Ein Naqquba 3,849
- Ein Rafa 1,417

=== East Jerusalem ===
East Jerusalem was annexed by Israel after its victory over Jordan during the Six-Day War in 1967. East Jerusalem was joined with West Jerusalem, along with several surrounding Palestinian towns and villages. Today, Arabs constitute 61% of the population of East Jerusalem and 38% of that of Jerusalem as a whole. The following are Arab neighborhoods of Jerusalem.

- Beit Hanina (al-Jadid or Eastern portion)†
- Beit Safafa
- Jabel Mukaber
- Old City (Armenian, Muslim & Christian Quarters)†
- Ras al-Amud
- Sheikh Jarrah
- Shuafat
- Silwan
- Sur Baher
- At-Tur
- Umm Tuba
- Wadi al-Joz
- al-Walaja

† Significant presence of Christian population

== Southern District ==
216,200 Arabs live in the Southern District, which has a total population of 1,146,600. The Arab population lives primarily in the northwestern Negev and is entirely composed of Muslim Bedouins. Several towns in the area are not formally recognized by the government and do not receive basic utilities from the state (see unrecognized Bedouin villages in Israel). The largest Arab locality in the Negev is Rahat.

- Abu Qrenat
- Abu Talul
- Ar'arat an-Naqab
- Ateer
- al-Atrash
- Bir Hadaj
- Dhahiyah
- Drijat
- Ghazzah
- Hura
- Kukhleh
- Kuseife
- Lakiya
- Makhul
- Mitnan
- Mulada
- Qasr al-Sir
- Rahat
- al-Sayyid
- Shaqib al-Salam
- Tirabin al-Sana
- Tel as-Sabi
- Umm Batin

== Northern District ==
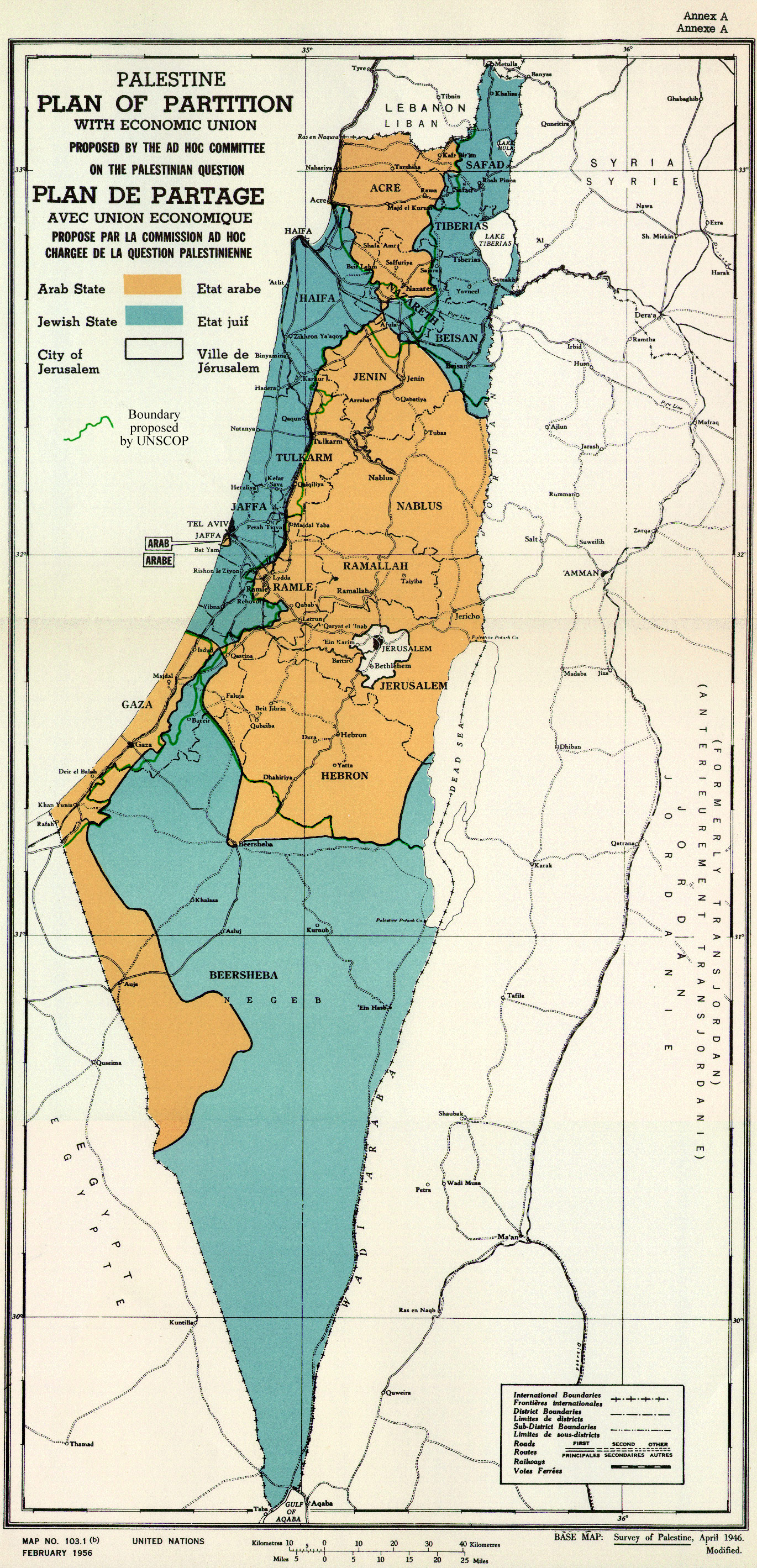
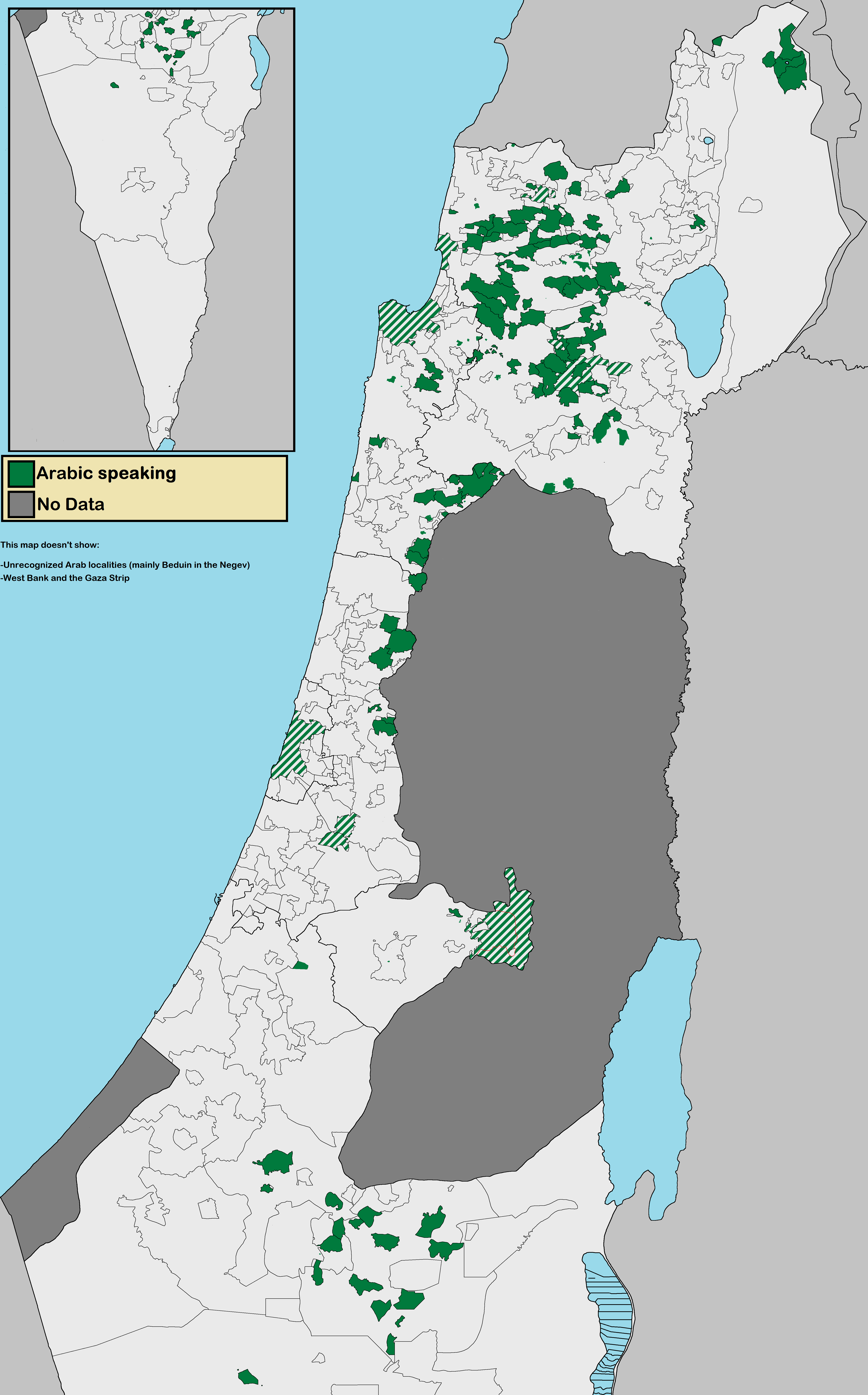
The United Nations Partition Plan for Palestine (top) allocated a large area in today's Northern District to the "Arab state"; the 1948 depopulation of more than 400 towns and villages in the area that became Israel was less concentrated in the area (middle); today the concentration of Arabic speaking localities remains in the area (bottom).

705,200 Arabs live in the Northern District, which has a total population of 1,320,800. In 2008, Arabs made up 53% of the Northern District's population, making it Israel's only district with an Arab majority. 44% of the Arab population lives in this district. Nazareth is the largest city, with a population of approximately 66,000. One of the Arab groups living in the Northern District are the Galilee Bedouin.

- Abu Sinan☆†
- Arab al-Aramshe
- Arab al-Subeih
- Arab al-Na'im
- Arraba†
- Basmat Tab'un
- Beit Jann☆
- Bi'ina†
- Bir al-Maksur
- Bu'eine Nujeidat (Note: Result of a merger between the town of Bu'eine and the Bedouin village of Nujeidat)
- Daburiyya
- Ed Dahi
- Deir al-Asad
- Deir Hanna†
- Dmeide
- Eilabun†
- Ein al-Asad☆
- Ein Mahil
- Fassuta†
- Hamaam
- Hamdon
- Hurfeish☆†
- Hussniyya
- I'billin†
- Iksal
- Ilut
- Jadeidi-Makr (Note: Result of a merger between the Arab towns of Jadeidi and Makr)
- Jish†
- Julis☆
- Ka'abiyye-Tabbash-Hajajre (Note: Result of a merger between Ka'abiyye, Tabash and Hajajre)
- Kabul
- Kafr Kanna†
- Kafr Manda
- Kafr Misr
- Kafr Yasif†☆
- Kamanneh (Note: Result of a merger between the Bedouin villages of Kamanneh East and Kamanneh West)
- Kaukab Abu al-Hija
- Kfar Kama (Note: Entire population is made of Circassians, but are considered Arabs.)
- Kisra-Sumei☆† (Note: Result of a merger between Arab villages of Kisra and Kafr Sumei)
- Maghar☆†
- Majd al-Krum
- Manshiya Zabda
- Mashhad
- Mazra'a†
- Mi'ilya†
- Muqeible†
- Nahf
- Na'ura
- Nazareth†
- Nein
- Peki'in☆†
- Rameh†☆
- Ras al-Ein†
- Rehaniya
- Reineh†
- Rumana
- Rumat al-Heib
- Sajur☆
- Sakhnin†
- Sallama
- Sandala
- Sha'ab
- Shefa-'Amr†☆
- Sheikh Danun
- Shibli–Umm al-Ghanam (Note: Result of a merger between Bedouin villages of Arab Shibli and Umm al-Ghanam)
- Sulam
- Suweid Hamira
- Taibe
- Tarshiha† (Note: Result of a merger between the Jewish town of Ma'alot and the Arab town of Tarshiha)
- Tamra City, Akka Subdistrict
- Tamra Village, Jezreel sub-district
- Tuba-Zangariyye (Note: Result of a merger between Bedouin villages of Tuba and az-Zangariyya)
- Tur'an†
- Uzeir
- Yafa an-Naseriyye†
- Yanuh-Jat☆ (Note: Result of a merger between Yanuh and Jat)
- Yarka☆
- Zarzir

† Significant presence of Christian population († - Christian majority)

☆ Significant presence of Druze population (☆ - Druze majority)

=== Golan Heights ===
The Golan Heights was captured during the Six-Day War in 1967 and de facto annexed by Israel in 1981. Israel governs the Golan Heights as a part of the Northern District. As a result of the war, many villages were abandoned. The Israeli Head of Surveying and Demolition Supervision for the Golan Heights proposed the demolition of 127 of the unpopulated villages, with about 90 abandoned villages demolished shortly after 15 May 1968. The demolitions were carried out by contractors hired for the job. Five Arab towns remain today. 23,900 Arabs live in the Golan Heights. The area is home to an approximately equal number of non-Arab Israelis.

- Buq'ata☆
- Ein Qiniyye☆†
- Ghajar
- Majdal Shams☆†
- Mas'ade☆

☆ Significant presence of Druze population (☆ - Druze majority)

† Significant presence of Christian population

== See also ==
- Arab citizens of Israel
- Districts of Israel
- Depopulated Palestinian locations in Israel
