= Hurvat Amudim =

Ancient village in Israel

- חורבת עמודים, שדה עמודים (Hebrew)
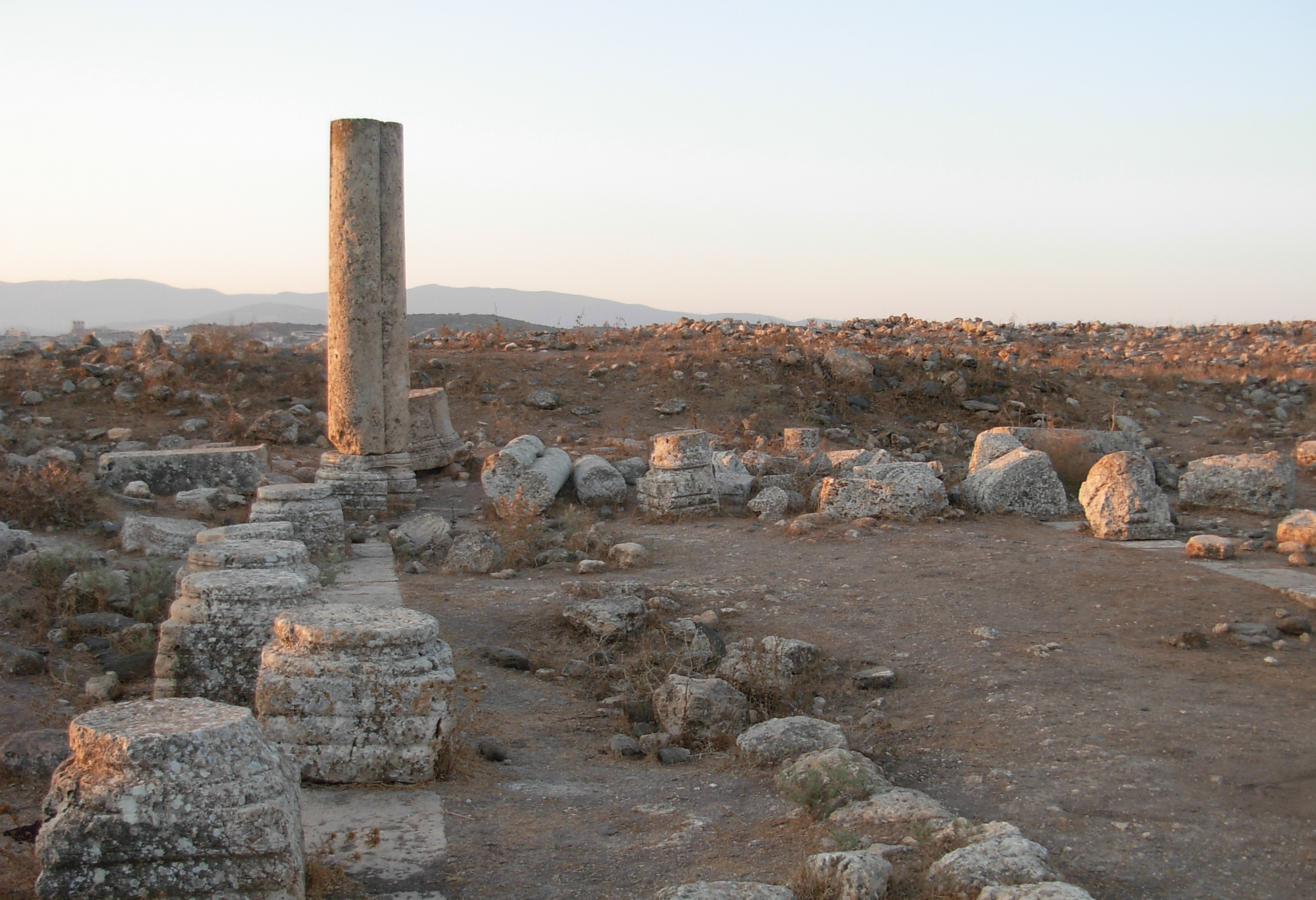
- Ancient synagogue.

- Location within Israel
- 32.815214°N 35.409983°E

Hurvat Amudim or Sde Amudim was an ancient village, now an archaeological site, in Israel, located south-east of the Beit Netofa Valley, on the eastern side of Highway 65 between Golani Interchange and Kadarim Junction.

== History ==
The name derives from the columns that once supported the roof of the synagogue and that remained standing.

G. Dalman suggested identifying the site with Kefar Uzziel, mentioned in rabbinical sources and home to one of the 24 priestly families that settled in the Galilee from the 2nd century CE onward, owing to the similar sounding name of the nearby Arab-village, Uzeir (believed to be a corruption of "Uzziel"). The town was abandoned in the late 4th century.

Several archaeological excavations have been conducted at the site: In the late 19th century, Victor Guérin excavated there and discovered the synagogue; Heinrich Kohl and Carl Watzinger excavated the site in 1905 and mapped the structure of the synagogue; In 1979, Yigal Levin excavated the site and dated the construction of the synagogue to the end of the 3rd century or the beginning of the 4th century; In 2011, an excavation was conducted around the entire area by archaeologists Oren Zingboim and Edna Dalali-Amos.

In 2012, an archaeological excavation was conducted on the western side of the site by archaeologists Gilad Tsinmon and Leah Porat. They discovered quarries, a burial cave, hewn tombs, and ceramic vessels dating between the 1st century BCE to the 10th century CE.

== Synagogue ==
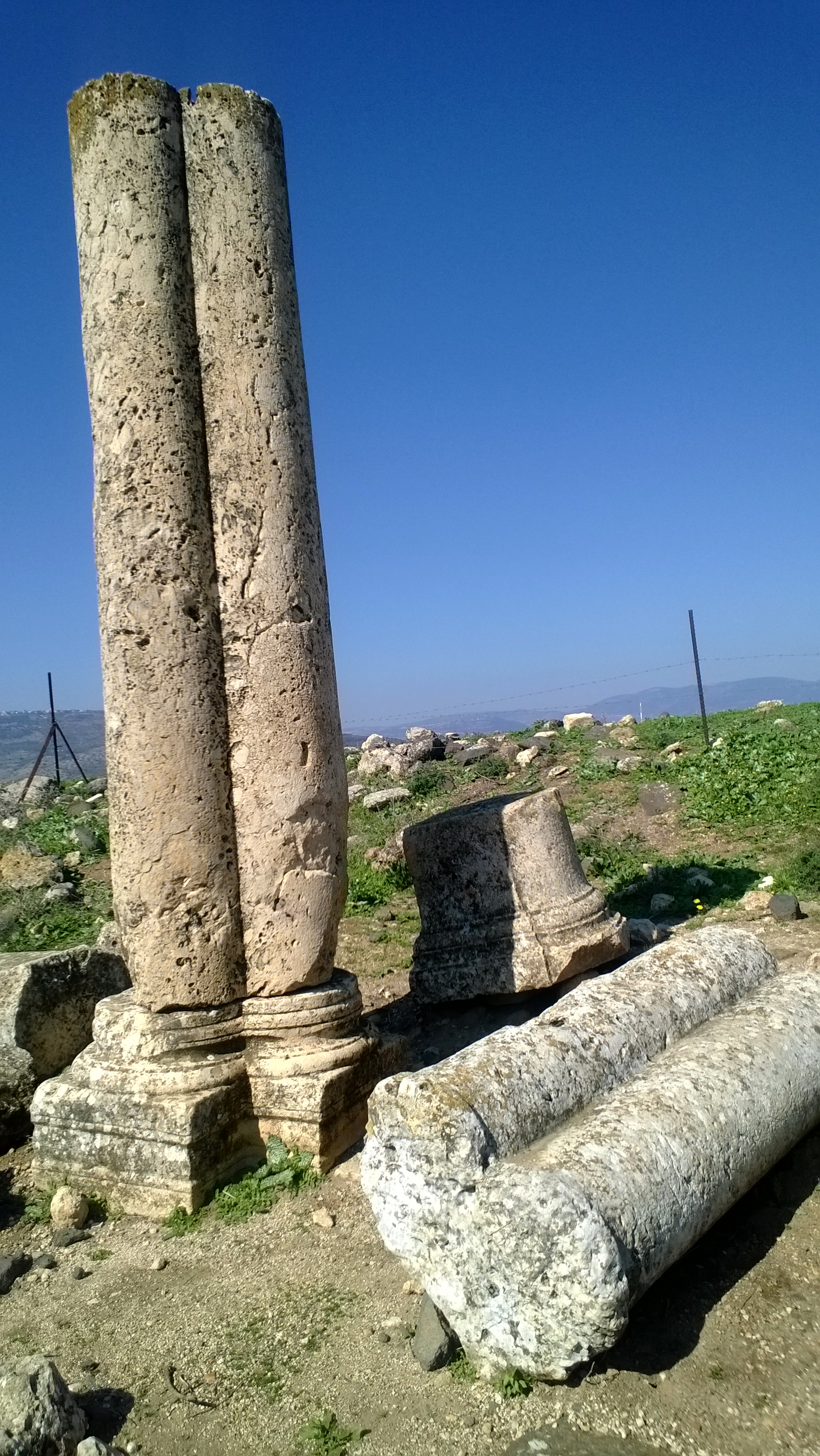
One of the columns at the site.

A synagogue, one of the largest in the Galilee (25 × 14 meters), was built at the end of the 3rd century or the beginning of the 4th century. The building featured two rows of columns. An Aramaic inscription in the floor mosaic reads: "Remembered well... bar Tanhum, who made this pavement of mosaic and roof. May he be blessed. Amen. Selah." A second inscription reads, "Yo'ezer the hazan and Simeon his brother made this gate of the Lord of Heaven."

== See also ==
- Oldest synagogues in the world
- Archaeology in Israel
