= Wadi al-Hammam, Israel =

Arab village in northern Israel

Wadi al-Hammam: וַואדִי אל-חַמָּאם (Hebrew); وادي الحمام (Arabic)
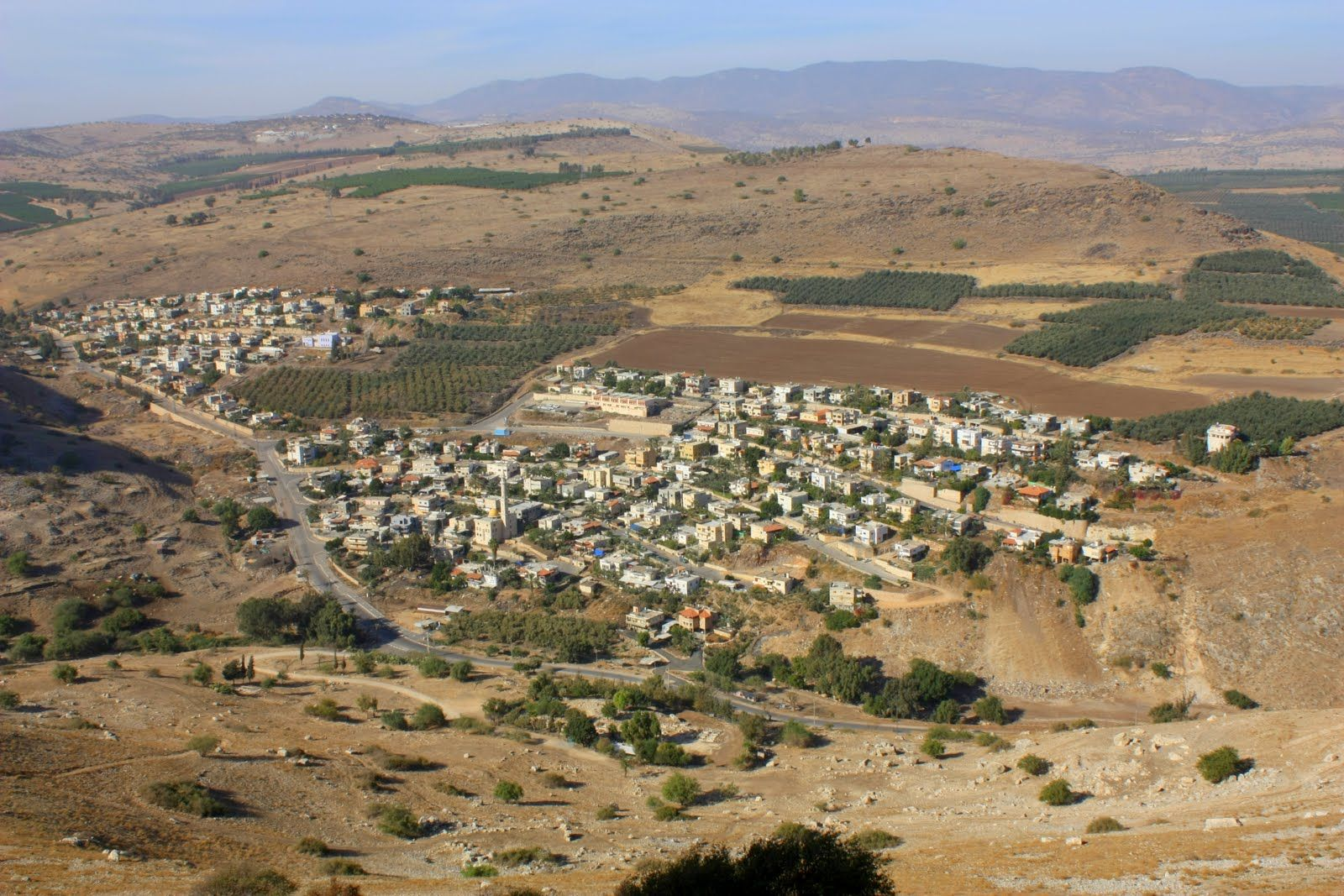

- Location within Northeast Israel Location within Israel
- Coordinates: 32°49′42″N 35°29′32″E
- Country: Israel
- District: Northern
- Subdistrict: Kinneret
- Council: al-Batuf
- Population (2024): 1,758

Wadi al-Hammam (Arabic: وادي الحمّام; Hebrew: וַאדִי אל-חַמָּאם), or Wadi Hamam, is an Arab village in northern Israel, located near the Sea of Galilee, at the foot of Mount Nitai and across the Wadi Hamam valley from Mount Arbel. It is the easternmost part of the al-Batuf Regional Council. In 2024 its population was 1,758.

== History ==
In 1948, some of the Arab inhabitants of Wadi El Hammam fled to Lebanon. It contains one fairly modern mosque and the trail head for the steep ascent of Mount Arbel.

== Archaeology ==
Khirbet Wadi Hamam is an archaeological site on the outskirts of Hamaam. It was registered as Khirbet el-Wereidat in the PEF's 1870 Survey of Western Palestine, from which the modern Hebrew name-Hurbat Vradim, also spelled Hurvat/Horvat Veradim-was derived. The site was excavated between 2007 and 2012 by a team under dig director Uzi Leibner of Hebrew University and yielded the remains of a large Roman-period Jewish village that was abandoned after a decades-long process of decline around the year 400, at the beginning of the Byzantine period. The village was situated at the foot of Mount Nitai and thus on the ancient road connecting the central Galilee, through Wadi Hamam, with the Sea of Galilee.

=== Ancient synagogue ===
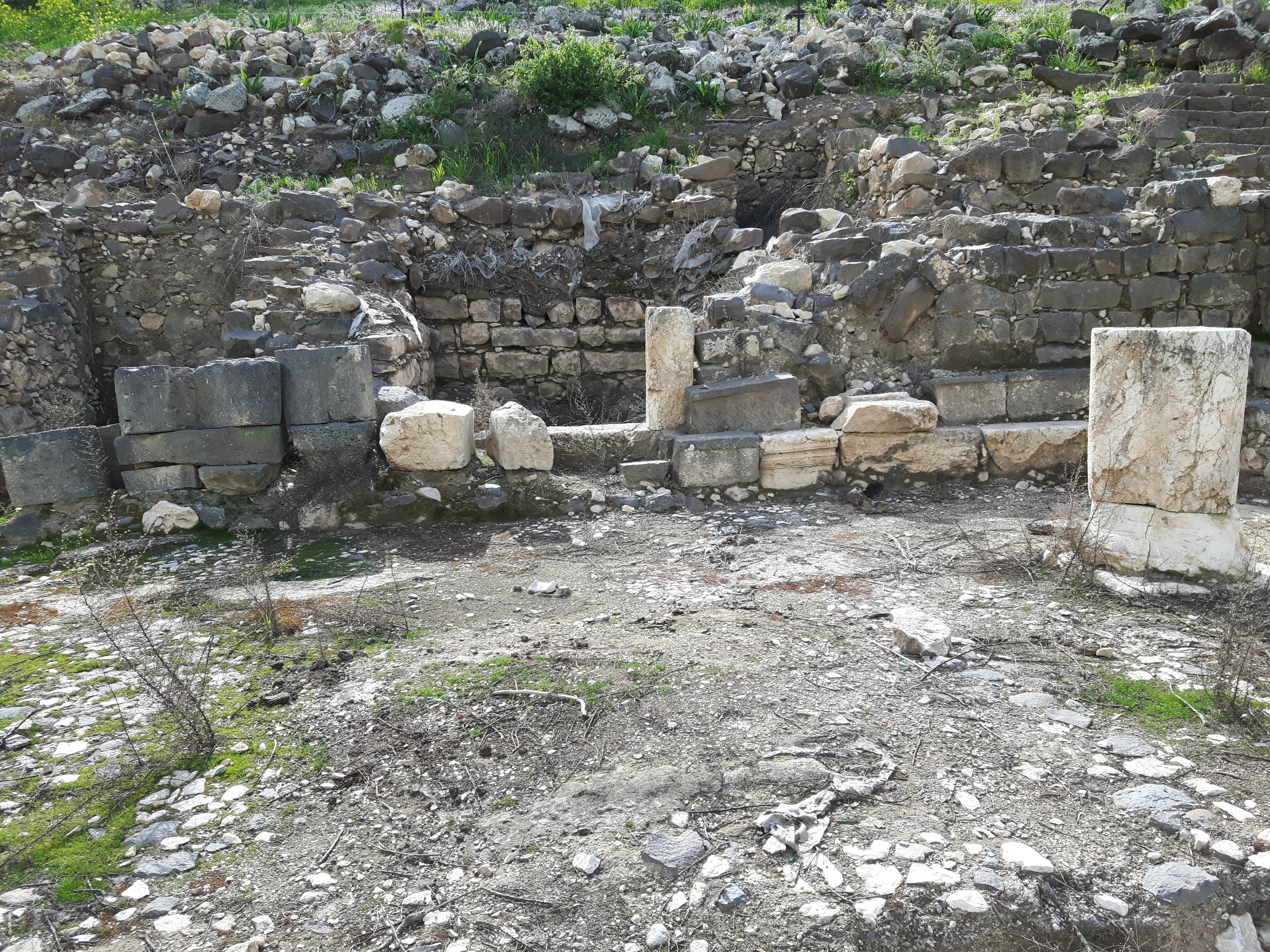

An ancient synagogue exists on the site with a partially preserved mosaic floor.

== Nature reserve ==
The fortifications atop Mount Nitai, which is a nature reserve and off limits for visitors, have also been surveyed and partially excavated with the purpose of dating them and placing them in a historical context.

== See also ==
- Ancient synagogues in Palestine - refers to the entire Palestine region (Land of Israel)
  - Ancient synagogues in Israel - synagogues located within the modern state of Israel
- Arab localities in Israel
- Al-Khisas, Hula Valley, the original pre-1948 village of the Wadi Hamam inhabitants
- 'Akbara, where inhabitants of Al-Khisas were forcibly evacuated to in 1949 until agreeing to resettlement in Wadi Hamam
- Al-Muftakhira, Hula Valley, mentioned by W. Khalidi as the original pre-1948 village of the inhabitants
