= Rumat al-Heib =

Rumat al-Heib: רומת אל-הייב (Hebrew); رُمة الهـَيـْب (Arabic)
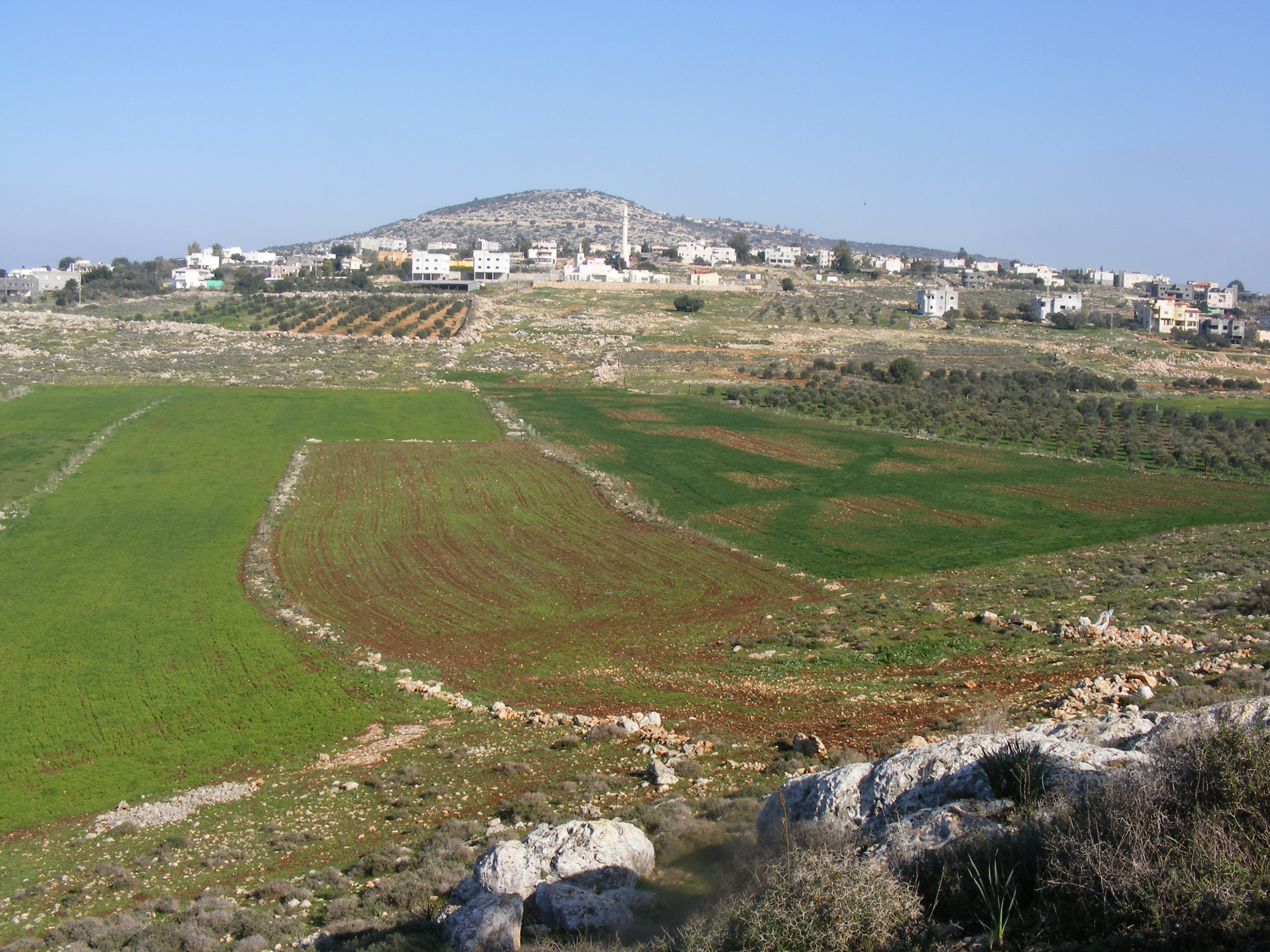
- Rumat al-Heib, 2011

- Location within Jezreel Valley region of Israel Location within Israel
- Coordinates: 32°46′39″N 35°18′26″E
- Country: Israel
- District: Northern
- Subdistrict: Jezreel
- Council: Al-Batuf
- Founded: 1920s
- Population (2024): 2,626

Rumat al-Heib (Arabic: رُمة الهـَيـْب; Hebrew: רומת אל-הייב) is a Bedouin village in northern Israel. Located near Nazareth in the Lower Galilee, it falls under the jurisdiction of the al-Batuf Regional Council. In 2024 its population was 2,626.

Many of the al-Heib men conscript for a full service in the IDF, and many also volunteer for professional military service. The Bedouin Soldier memorial is located in the vicinity of the village.

== History ==
=== British Mandate ===
The village was established at the beginning of the 1920s by members of the Arab al-Heib tribe and was originally named after the family.

In the 1931 census the population was counted with nearby Rumana, and together they had 197 inhabitants; 195 Muslims and 2 Christians, in a total of 36 houses.

=== Israel ===
The al-Heib Bedouin tribe was one of the several Bedouin allies of the Jewish military forces during the 1948 Arab–Israeli War, actively participating in securing the lower Galilee and the Beit She'an Valley from Arab paramilitaries and the Arab Liberation Army. The al-Heib fighters later formed the core of the Minorities Unit of the Israel Defense Forces.

In 2007, there were tensions between the village and the nearby moshav of Tzippori, with the Bedouins accused of cattle rustling.

== Bibliography ==
- Mills, E., ed. (1932). Census of Palestine 1931. Population of Villages, Towns and Administrative Areas. Jerusalem: Government of Palestine.
