= Hamdon =

- Location within Northeast Israel
- Coordinates: 32°53′6″N 35°21′58″E
- Country: Israel
- District: Northern
- Council: Misgav

Hamdon (Hebrew: חמדון, Arabic: حمدون) is an unrecognized Bedouin village in northern Israel. Located in the Galilee near Lotem, it falls under the jurisdiction of Misgav Regional Council.

== See also ==
- Arab localities in Israel
- Bedouin in Israel
