= Kafr Bara =

Arab-Muslim locality and village in central Israel

Kafr Barra: כַּפְר בַּרָא; كفر برا , کفر برا
- Local council

A transcription(s)
  - ISO 259: Káper Bárraˀ
  - Also spelled: Kafar Barra (official); Kfar Bara (unofficial)
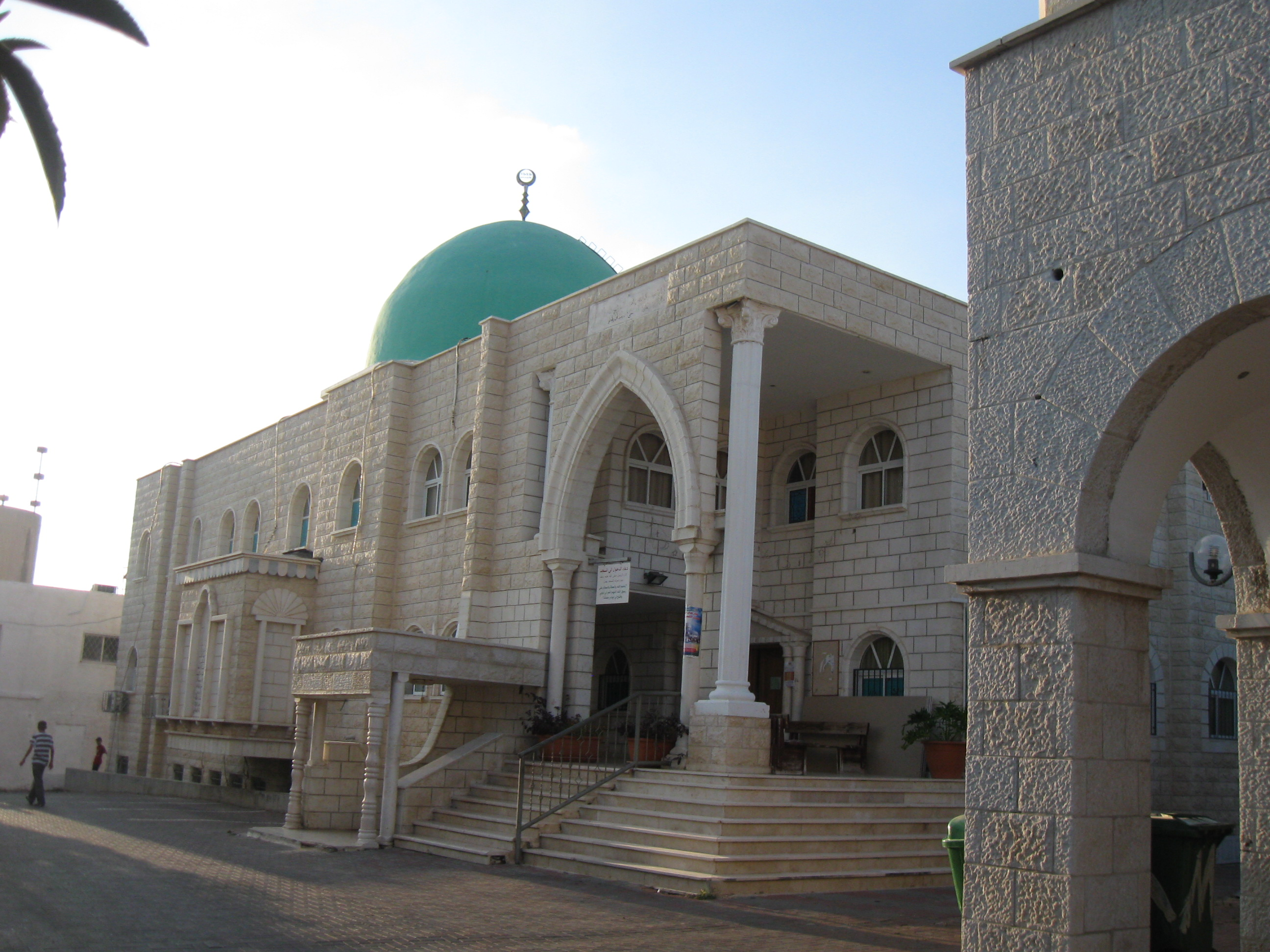
- A mosque of Kafr Bara in 2010

- Location within Central Israel
- Coordinates: 32°7′50″N 34°58′19″E
- Grid position: 147/170 PAL
- Country: Israel
- District: Central
- Subdistrict: Petah Tikva
- Natural Region: Petah Tikva

Area
  - Total: 9,387 dunams (9.387 km^{2}; 3.624 sq mi)

Population (2024)
  - Total: 3,962
  - Density: 422.1/km^{2} (1,093/sq mi)
- Name meaning: Khirbet Kafr Bara, "The ruin of the village of Bara"

Kafr Barra (Arabic: كفر برّا; Hebrew: כַּפְר בַּרָא) is an Arab locality in Israel in situated in its Central District. The small village, located near the Green Line, is often considered a part of the Arabs' Little Triangle along with the cities of Kafr Qasim and Jaljulia. In 2024 its population was 3,962.

== History ==
Pottery and glass dating from the Roman period (second century CE) and early Byzantine period (fourth century and beginning of fifth century CE), have been found in a burial cave at Kafr Barra. Various agricultural installations, including a winepress, dating from Byzantine era has also been excavated. Archaeological excavations have revealed remains, apparently from a rural settlement from the Byzantine and Early Islamic periods (sixth–ninth centuries CE).

=== Ottoman Empire ===
In 1517, the village was included in the Ottoman Empire with the rest of Palestine, and in the 1596 tax-records it appeared located in the Nahiya of Jabal Qubal, part of Nablus Sanjak. It had a population of 20 Muslim households, who paid a fixed tax-rate of 33,3 % on agricultural products, including wheat, barley, summer crops, and goats and/or beehives; a total of 2,920 akçe. 5/6 of the revenue went to a Waqf.

=== British Mandate ===
At the 1931 census of Palestine, conducted by the British Mandate Kafr Barra had 95 inhabitants, all Muslims, in a total of 19 houses.

In the 1945 statistics the population of Kafr Barra was 150, all Muslims, who owned 3,959 dunams of land according to an official land and population survey. Of this, 10 dunams were for citrus and bananas, 12 were plantations and irrigable land, 1,841 used for cereals, while 14 dunams were built-up (urban) land.

=== Israel ===
Since 1948, Kafr Barra has been part of the newly founded State of Israel.

Kafr Barra had a population of 3,274 in the 2014 census.

== Voting Patterns ==
In the 2026 election, 97 percent of voters in Kafr Bara voted for the Arab parties, while 2.6 percent voted for the parties of the center-left coalition led by Gadi Eisenkot and 0.7 percent voted for the parties of the right-wing coalition led by Benjamin Netanyahu. Among the voters for the Arab parties, 73 percent voted for Ra'am, while 27 percent voted for the Joint List. Voter turnout increased 47 percent from the 2022 election.

== See also ==
- Arab localities in Israel

== Bibliography ==
- Abu Fana, Mohammed (11 February 2010). "Kafr Bara Final Report". Hadashot Arkheologiyot – Excavations and Surveys in Israel (122).
- Eshed, Vered (6 August 2017). "Kafr Bara Final Report". Hadashot Arkheologiyot – Excavations and Surveys in Israel (129).
- Government of Palestine, Department of Statistics (1945). Village Statistics, April, 1945.
- Hadawi, S. (1970). Village Statistics of 1945: A Classification of Land and Area ownership in Palestine. Palestine Liberation Organization Research Center.
- Hütteroth, W.-D.; Abdulfattah, K. (1977). Historical Geography of Palestine, Transjordan and Southern Syria in the Late 16th Century. Erlanger Geographische Arbeiten, Sonderband 5. Erlangen, Germany: Vorstand der Fränkischen Geographischen Gesellschaft. ISBN 3-920405-41-2.
- Masarwa, Marwan (11 February 2008). "Kafr Bara Final Report". Hadashot Arkheologiyot – Excavations and Surveys in Israel (120).
- Mills, E., ed. (1932). Census of Palestine 1931. Population of Villages, Towns and Administrative Areas. Jerusalem: Government of Palestine.
- Palmer, E.H. (1881). The Survey of Western Palestine: Arabic and English Name Lists Collected During the Survey by Lieutenants Conder and Kitchener, R. E. Transliterated and Explained by E.H. Palmer. Committee of the Palestine Exploration Fund.
