= Al-Batuf Regional Council =

Regional council in Northern Israel

Coordinates: 32°47′N 35°19′E

Al-Batuf Regional Council Arabic: البطوف Hebrew: מועצה אזורית אל-בטוף
- Regional council (from 2000)
- Interactive map of Al-Batuf Regional Council
- Country: Israel
- District: Northern
- Subdistricts: Jezreel, Kinneret
- Natural regions: Nazareth-Tir'an Mountains, Kinerot

Government
  - Head of Municipality: Ahed Rahal

Area
  - Total: 4,270 dunams (4.27 km^{2}; 1.65 sq mi)

Population (2025)
  - Total: 9,429
  - Density: 2,210/km^{2} (5,720/sq mi)
- Website: el-batouf-region.muni.il

Al-Batuf Regional Council (Arabic: البطوف, Hebrew: מועצה אזורית אל-בטוף, Mo'atza Azorit al-Batuf) is a regional council located on the southern fringe of the Beit Netofa Valley, north of Nazareth, within the Northern District of Israel. It was formerly part of the Nof HaGalil regional council until 2000 and consists of the following four rural Arab villages.

- Hamaam
- Rumana
- Rumat al-Heib
- Uzeir

The regional council is named after the al-Baṭūf Plain (the Arabic name of Beit Netofa Valley), on which it is located. According to the Israeli Central Bureau of Statistics, al-Batuf had a population of 6,700 in 2010.

== Demographics ==
Historical population
| Year | Pop. | ±% |
|---|---|---|
| 1972 | 1,300 | — |
| 1983 | 2,900 | +123.1% |
| 1995 | 4,300 | +48.3% |
| 2008 | 6,400 | +48.8% |
| 2022 | 8,902 | +39.1% |
| 2024 | 9,388 | +5.5% |

== Voting Patterns ==
In the 2022 election, 89 percent of voters in the regional council voted for the Arab parties, while 6 percent voted for the parties of the right-wing coalition led by Benjamin Netanyahu and 5 percent voted for the parties of the center-left coalition led by Yair Lapid.

In the 2026 election, 95 percent of voters in the regional council voted for the Arab parties, while 3 percent voted for the parties of the center-left coalition led by Gadi Eisenkot and 1 percent voted for the parties of the right-wing coalition led by Benjamin Netanyahu. An additional 0.1 percent voted for the Reservists. Voter turnout increased 63 percent from the 2022 election.

== See also ==
- Arab localities in Israel
