= Arab al-Na'im =

Bedouin village in northern Israel

Arab al-Na'im: ערב א-נעים (Hebrew); عرب النعيم (Arabic)
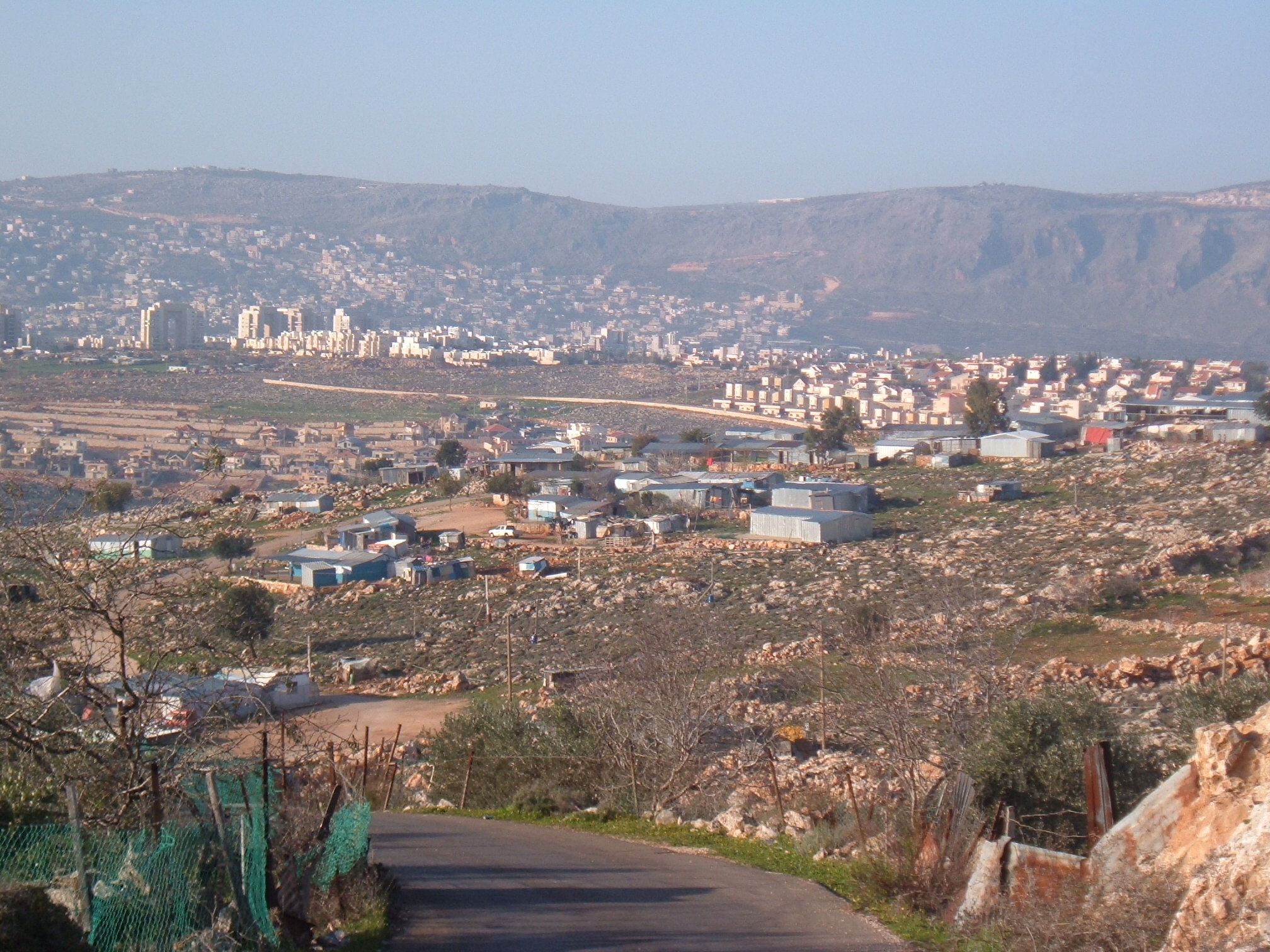

- Location within Northwest Israel Location within Israel
- Coordinates: 32°53′17″N 35°17′25″E
- Country: Israel
- District: Northern
- Subdistrict: Acre
- Council: Misgav
- Population (2024): 881

Arab al-Na'im (Arabic: عرب النعيم; Hebrew: ערב א-נעים) is a Bedouin village in northern Israel. Located in the Galilee near Karmiel, it falls under the jurisdiction of Misgav Regional Council. In 2024 its population was 881.

== History ==
=== 20th century ===
As an unrecognized Bedouin village, Arab al-Na'im only received access to piped water for the first time in 1993, when the neighbouring Jewish village of Eshhar decided to help out by providing it. Eshhar also helped with some other projects including the construction of a kindergarten. By 1998 Eshhar started to work intensively with the village to help it achieve recognition. Arab al-Na'im's Bedouin leader, Nimer Na'im, and Eshhar's Jewish chairman, Yisrael Ne’eman, agreed a joint border between their lands that year, and a petition for the recognition of Arab al-Na'im as a permanent village was presented to the director general of the Ministry of Interior.

=== 21st century ===
Arab al-Na'im was recognized by the national government in 2000, making it eligible for municipal services and bringing it under Misgav Regional Council. The two villages have continued to cooperate on planning and development. Since Arab al-Na'im has less land, their building permits allow houses of up to three stories as against Eshhar's two. The two villages are quoted as considering they have established “good neighbour relations,” each retaining its identity and agreeing to disagree where necessary.

By 2013 the village had a paved road system, along with other infrastructure worth some $20 million, with a new metaled access road constructed from a new roundabout at the entrance to the adjacent community of Eshhar finished by 2016. Following the institution of a master plan for the village, the first permanent masonry-built houses were constructed in the village in 2014, replacing wood and metal temporary shacks. By 2018 around forty new homes had been completed, transforming the village together with new sewers and roads.

== See also ==
- Arab localities in Israel
- Bedouin in Israel
