= Uzeir =

Arab village in northern Israel

Uzeir: עֻזֵיר, עוזייר (Hebrew); عزير (Arabic)
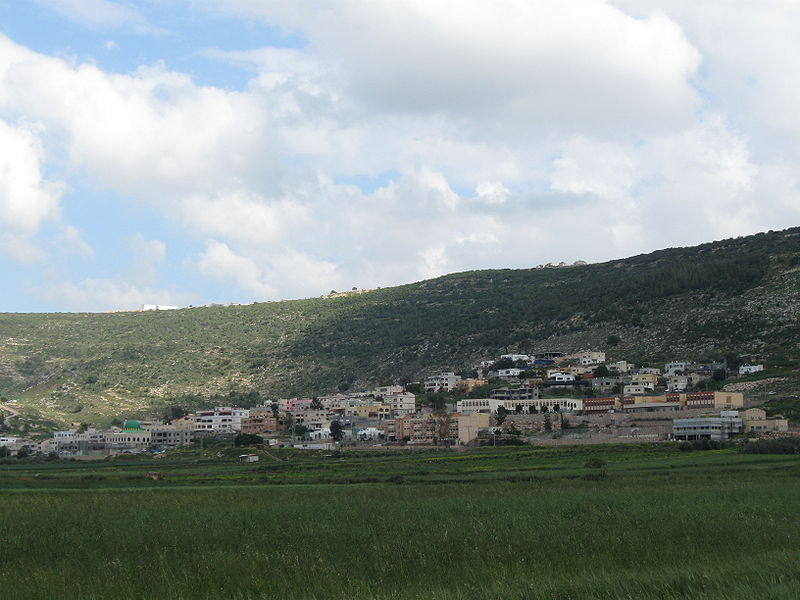
- Etymology: El Azeir, Ezra
- Location within Jezreel Valley region of Israel Location within Israel
- Coordinates: 32°47′32″N 35°19′51″E
- Grid position: 181/243 PAL
- Country: Israel
- District: Northern
- Subdistrict: Jezreel
- Council: al-Batuf
- Population (2024): 3,557

Uzeir (Arabic: عزير; Hebrew: עֻזֵיר) is an Arab village in northern Israel. Located near Nof HaGalil in the Lower Galilee, it falls under the jurisdiction of al-Batuf Regional Council. In 2024 it had a population of 3,557.

== History ==
Findings from the Roman, Byzantine and Early Islamic periods have been found in the village.

=== Ottoman Empire ===
It was mentioned in the Ottoman defter for the year 1555–1556, as Mezraa land, (that is, cultivated land), called ‘Uzayr, located in the Nahiya of Tabariyya of the Liwa of Safad. The land was designated as Timar land.

In 1799, a map from Napoleon's invasion by Pierre Jacotin showed the place, named as El Qasr.

In 1838 it was noted as a Muslim village, el-'Aziz, in the Nazareth District.

In 1875, the French explorer Victor Guérin reached the village and described it as consisting of about 20 houses on the side of a hill. A few old columns were remains after an ancient site which had preceded the present village. A Muslim Maqam with two small domes, dedicated to "Neby A'ouzeir" was close by. In Palestine Exploration Fund's 1881 Survey of Western Palestine, the village (called El Azeir) was described as:

A stone village at the foot of the hill. The plain to the north is cultivated with cotton, barley, etc. There are about 150 Moslems in the village. Water is supplied by cisterns in the village, and a tank.

A population list from about 1887 showed that el Azeir had about 45 Muslim inhabitants.

=== British Mandate ===
In the 1922 census of Palestine conducted by the British authorities, 'Uzair had a population of 70, all Muslims, increasing in the 1931 census to 88, still all Muslim, in 15 houses.

In the 1945 statistics the population was 150 Muslims while the total land area was 766 dunams, according to an official land and population survey. Of this, 737 dunams were allocated for cereals, while 7 dunams were classified as built-up areas.

=== Israel ===
In 1948, Uzeir was captured by the Israeli army during the second part of Operation Dekel between 15 and 18 July. The village remained under martial law until 1966.

== Demographics ==
Historical population
| Year | Pop. | ±% |
|---|---|---|
| 1972 | 600 | — |
| 1983 | 1,300 | +116.7% |
| 1995 | 1,700 | +30.8% |
| 2008 | 2,600 | +52.9% |
| 2022 | 3,355 | +29.0% |
| 2024 | 3,557 | +6.0% |

== Voting Patterns ==
In the 2026 election, 98 percent of voters in Uzeir voted for the Arab parties, while 1.5 percent voted for the parties of the center-left coalition led by Gadi Eisenkot and 0.1 percent voted for the parties of the right-wing coalition led by Benjamin Netanyahu. Among the voters for the Arab parties, 55 percent voted for the Joint List, while 45 percent voted for Ra'am. Voter turnout increased 75 percent from the 2022 election.

== See also ==
- Arab localities in Israel

== Bibliography ==
- Alexandre, Yardenna (2001). "'Uzeir" (113). Hadashot Arkheologiyot – Excavations and Surveys in Israel.
- Barron, J.B., ed. (1923). Palestine: Report and General Abstracts of the Census of 1922. Government of Palestine.
- Conder, C.R.; Kitchener, H.H. (1881). The Survey of Western Palestine: Memoirs of the Topography, Orography, Hydrography, and Archaeology. Vol. 1. London: Committee of the Palestine Exploration Fund.
- Cinamon, Gilad (2012-03-15). "'Uzeir, West" (124). Hadashot Arkheologiyot – Excavations and Surveys in Israel.
- Cinamon, Gilad (2013-12-04). "'Uzeir, Survey of Har Tur'an" (125). Hadashot Arkheologiyot – Excavations and Surveys in Israel.
- Department of Statistics (1945). Village Statistics, April, 1945. Government of Palestine.
- Guérin, V. (1880). Description Géographique Historique et Archéologique de la Palestine (in French). Vol. 3: Galilee, pt. 1. Paris: L'Imprimerie Nationale.
- Hadawi, S. (1970). Village Statistics of 1945: A Classification of Land and Area ownership in Palestine. Palestine Liberation Organization Research Center.
- Karmon, Y. (1960). "An Analysis of Jacotin's Map of Palestine" (PDF). Israel Exploration Journal. 10 (3, 4): 155–173, 244–253. Archived from the original (PDF) on 2019-12-22.
- Mills, E., ed. (1932). Census of Palestine 1931. Population of Villages, Towns and Administrative Areas. Jerusalem: Government of Palestine.
- Palmer, E.H. (1881). The Survey of Western Palestine: Arabic and English Name Lists Collected During the Survey by Lieutenants Conder and Kitchener, R. E. Transliterated and Explained by E.H. Palmer. Committee of the Palestine Exploration Fund.
- Rhode, H. (1979). Administration and Population of the Sancak of Safed in the Sixteenth Century. Columbia University. Archived from the original on 2020-03-01.
- Robinson, E.; Smith, E. (1841). Biblical Researches in Palestine, Mount Sinai and Arabia Petraea: A Journal of Travels in the year 1838. Vol. 3. Boston: Crocker & Brewster.
- Schumacher, G. (1888). "Population list of the Liwa of Akka". Quarterly Statement - Palestine Exploration Fund. 20: 169–191.
