= Rumana, Israel =

Rumana: רומאנה (Hebrew); رمانة (Arabic)
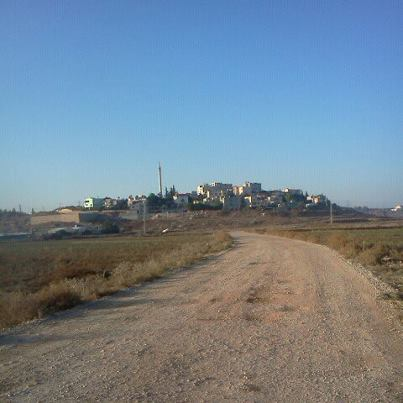
- Etymology: Pomegranate
- Location within Northwest Israel Location within Israel
- Coordinates: 32°47′17″N 35°18′38″E
- Grid position: 179/243 PAL
- Country: Israel
- District: Northern
- Subdistrict: Jezreel
- Council: al-Batuf
- Population (2024): 1,446

Rumana (Arabic: رمانة; Hebrew: רֻמָּנָה, רומאנה) is an Arab village in northern Israel. Located near Nazareth, it falls under the jurisdiction of al-Batuf Regional Council. In 2024 its population was 1,446.

== History ==
The Palestine Exploration Fund's Survey of Western Palestine found cisterns and rock-cut caves, and traces of ancient remains at this village.

Sherds ascribed to the Early Bronze Age I and the Intermediate Bronze Age have been found, as well as a cluster of sherds from the Iron Age II (tenth–eighth centuries BCE). A building with sherds from the Iron Age II and the Persian era have also been excavated.

Graves dating to the Persian era and remains of an architectural complex from the Roman era (first–third centuries CE) have been excavated here.

=== Crusader period ===
It has been suggested that Rumana was Romette, a casuale belonging to the Knights Hospitallers in the Crusader era.

=== Mamluk period ===
A small number of remains from the Mamluk era has also been found.

=== Ottoman period ===
Rumana, like the rest of Palestine, was incorporated into the Ottoman Empire in 1517, and in the census of 1548–1549 or 1596, the village was located in the nahiya of Tabariyya in the liwa of Safad. It had a population of 9 households, all Muslim. The villagers paid taxes on wheat, barley, fruit trees, cotton, goats and beehives. Pierre Jacotin called the village Roumani on his map in 1799. In 1572, the men of Rumana, nearby Ruma, Kafr Manda, and Saffuriya allied with local Bedouins and raided the waqf lands of Hittin and its shrine of Nabi Shu'ayb, taking hundreds of cattle and donkeys and damaging the village.

Rummana was mentioned by Richard Pococke during his visit to the area in 1737 and he speculated it probably received its name from the pomegranates grew there.

Biblical scholar Edward Robinson passed by the village in 1852, and assumed it was the ancient Rimmon of the Tribe of Zebulun. French explorer Victor Guérin described the village in the 1870s as being small, and protected from the outside by a continuous wall, and hedges of cactus. He also found many fine remains from former times and also speculates that it might be the Biblical site of Rimon, which is mentioned in the Book of Joshua. (Joshua 19:13) In Palestine Exploration Fund's 1881 Survey of Western Palestine, the village (called Rummaneh) was described as:

A small village built of stone, and containing about 70 Moslems. It is situated on a low ridge above the plain, and there are a few olive-trees around. The water supply is from cisterns and a well.

A population list from about 1887 showed that er Rummaneh had about 40 Muslim inhabitants.

=== British Mandate period ===
In the 1922 census of Palestine conducted by the British Mandate authorities, Rummaneh had a population of 37, of which 33 were Muslims and 4 Christians. The Christians were all Melkite. In the 1931 census the population was counted with nearby Rumat al-Heib, and together they had 197 inhabitants; 195 Muslims and 2 Christians, in a total of 36 houses. In the 1945 statistics the population was 590, all Muslims while the total land area was 1,493 dunams, according to an official land and population survey. Of this, 28 dunams were allocated for plantations and irrigable land, 796 for cereals, while 5 dunams were classified as built-up areas.

=== Israel ===
In 1948 the village was captured by the Israeli army during Operation Dekel, 15–18 July. It remained under martial law until 1966.

== Bibliography ==
- Barron, J.B., ed. (1923). Palestine: Report and General Abstracts of the Census of 1922. Government of Palestine.
- Conder, C.R. (1890). "Norman Palestine". Quarterly Statement - Palestine Exploration Fund. 22: 29–37.
- Conder, C.R.; Kitchener, H.H. (1881). The Survey of Western Palestine: Memoirs of the Topography, Orography, Hydrography, and Archaeology. Vol. 1. London: Committee of the Palestine Exploration Fund.
- Feig, Nurit (2016-01-17). "Rumana". Hadashot Arkheologiyot – Excavations and Surveys in Israel (128).
- Government of Palestine, Department of Statistics (1945). Village Statistics, April, 1945.
- Guérin, V. (1868). Description Géographique Historique et Archéologique de la Palestine (in French). Vol. 1: Judee, pt. 1. Paris: L'Imprimerie Nationale.
- Hadawi, S. (1970). Village Statistics of 1945: A Classification of Land and Area ownership in Palestine. Palestine Liberation Organization Research Center.
- Heyd, Uriel (1960). Ottoman Documents on Palestine, 1552–1615. Oxford: Oxford University Press.
- Hütteroth, W.-D.; Abdulfattah, K. (1977). Historical Geography of Palestine, Transjordan and Southern Syria in the Late 16th Century. Erlanger Geographische Arbeiten, Sonderband 5. Erlangen, Germany: Vorstand der Fränkischen Geographischen Gesellschaft. ISBN 3-920405-41-2.
- Karmon, Y. (1960). "An Analysis of Jacotin's Map of Palestine" (PDF). Israel Exploration Journal. 10 (3, 4): 155–173, 244–253.
- Mills, E., ed. (1932). Census of Palestine 1931. Population of Villages, Towns and Administrative Areas. Jerusalem: Government of Palestine.
- Morris, B. (1987). The birth of the Palestinian refugee problem, 1947-1949. Cambridge University Press. ISBN 0-521-33028-9.
- Palmer, E.H. (1881). The Survey of Western Palestine: Arabic and English Name Lists Collected During the Survey by Lieutenants Conder and Kitchener, R. E. Transliterated and Explained by E.H. Palmer. Committee of the Palestine Exploration Fund.
- Pococke, R. (1745). A Description of the East, and some Other Countries. Vol. 2. London: Printed for the author, by W. Bowyer.
- Rey, E.G. (1883). Les colonies franques de Syrie aux XIIme et XIIIme siècles (in French). Paris: A. Picard.
- Robinson, E.; Smith, E. (1856). Later Biblical Researches in Palestine and adjacent regions: A Journal of Travels in the year 1852. London: John Murray.
- Schumacher, G. (1888). "Population list of the Liwa of Akka". Quarterly Statement - Palestine Exploration Fund. 20: 169–191.
- Stepansky, Yosef (2000). "Rumana" (112). Hadashot Arkheologiyot – Excavations and Surveys in Israel.
- Velde, van de, C.W.M. (1854). Narrative of a journey through Syria and Palestine in 1851 and 1852. Vol. 2. William Blackwood and son.(p. 404)
