= Lower Galilee =

Region in Israel

Lower Galilee: הגליל התחתון (Hebrew); الجليل الأسفل (Arabic)
- Region
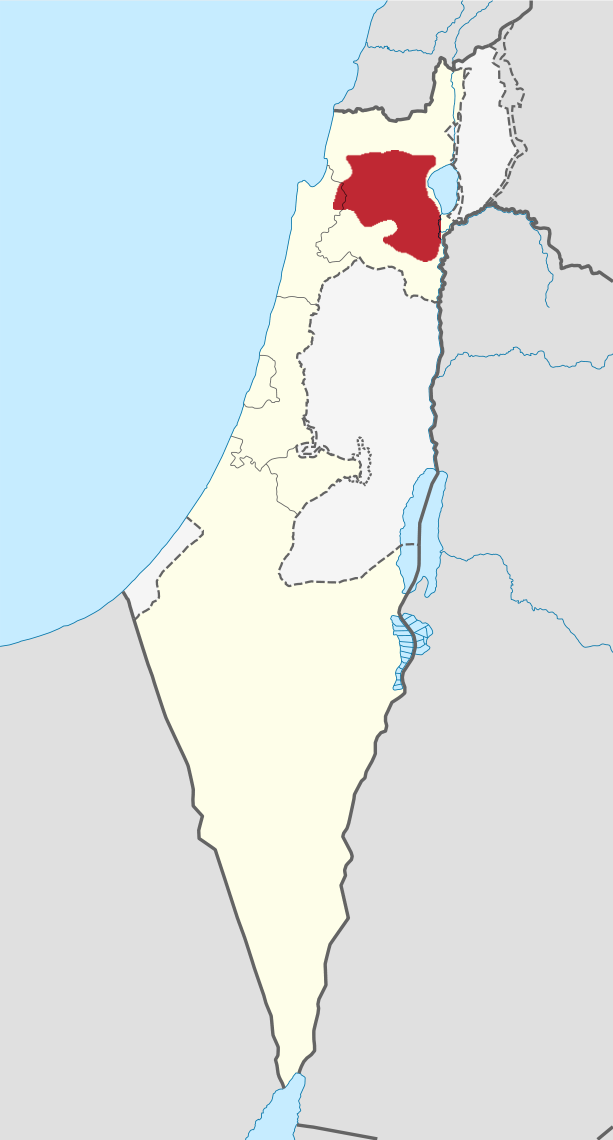
- The location of the Lower Galilee region in Israel
- Interactive map of Lower Galilee
- Coordinates: 32°44′N 35°27′E
- Part of: Israel
- Highest elevation: 598 m (1,962 ft) (Mount Kamon)

The Lower Galilee (Hebrew: הגליל התחתון, romanized: hag-Galil hat-Taḥton; Arabic: الجليل الأسفل, romanized: al-Jalil al-Asfal) is a region within the Northern District of Israel. The Lower Galilee is bordered by the Jezreel Valley to the south; the Upper Galilee to the north, from which it is separated by the Beit HaKerem Valley; the Jordan Rift Valley with the Jordan River and the Sea of Galilee to the east; and to the west, a segment of the Northern Coastal Plain known as the Zvulun Valley (Zebulon Valley), stretching between the Carmel ridge and Acre. The Lower Galilee is the southern part of the Galilee. In Josephus' time, it was known to stretch in breadth from Xaloth (Iksal) to Bersabe, and in length from Cabul to Tiberias, a region that contains around 470 km^{2}. It is called "Lower" since it is less mountainous than the Upper Galilee. The peaks of the Lower Galilee rise to 500 m (1,600 ft) above sea level. The tallest peaks are Mount Kamon (598 m (1,962 ft)) at the northern part of the Lower Galilee, and Mount Tabor (588 m (1,929 ft)) in the southern part.

== Geography ==
The Lower Galilee consists of three different regions which differ in their geological structure:

- The western Lower Galilee
- The central Lower Galilee
- The high regions of the eastern Lower Galilee

The central Lower Galilee consists of low mountain ranges which extend from east to west with several valleys in between; south of the Beit Kerem (Šagor) Valley is the Shagor mountain range, then Sakhnin valley, Yodfat range, Beit Netofa Valley, Tur'an valley and range, Nazareth range, and Ksulot (Joshua 19:18) valley. In the western part of the Lower Galilee there are several low hills (200–300 meters) covered with Oak tree forests, the central Lower Galilee region is more mountainous and the eastern Lower Galilee region turn into flat basalt mountainside reaching heights of 300 meters above sea level which extend from northeast to the southwest.

Although the landscape of the Lower Galilee is less dramatic than that of the Upper Galilee, it is greener, more peaceful and quiet. The Lower Galilee is more accessible to the majority of Israelis (less than a 2-hour drive from the Tel Aviv area). Much of the produce farms of Israel originates in the Lower Galilee, especially in the Jezreel Valley and the Beit She'an Valley.

== Type of soil ==
The soil of the Lower Galilee mainly consists of the following:

- Limestone - the lands in the central Lower Galilee region consists mainly of limestone which was created due to accumulation of shells and skeletons of marine life on the seabed.
- Brown Terra Rossa - the Lower Galilee region also have many areas which consists of this type of soil which has high amounts of minerals. The Terra Rossa is the basis for the development of forests in the Galilee because it has a large amount of mineral needed for the trees to grow.
- Basalt - the lands in the eastern Lower Galilee region (the area near the Golan Heights) consists mainly of basalt which is a type of rock that was created as a result of hot magma from erupted volcanoes which later cooled in temperature and became rock hard and impenetrable. The basalt areas also comprise very fertile soil.

== Water resources ==
Until 1932, the settlements in the eastern Lower Galilee relied solely on local spring water. Because these yields were only sufficient for domestic use, irrigated agriculture remained impossible in the Lower Galilee at the time. In 1932, the first Well drilling was done in the Yavne'el Valley, which supplied irrigation water to Yavne'el. In 1942, a water pipeline was constructed from the Sea of Galilee to the village, which extended its amount of agricultural lands, which were based mainly on the new water sources, despite the relatively high cost of water at that time. During the first decade of the State of Israel, the villages of the Lower Galilee were involved in a constant struggle with the government, demanding that the government would solve their water problems. After several local well drilling attempts failed during those years, water pipelines were laid from the Sea of Galilee to all villages in the Lower Galilee.

== Historical overview ==
In the Iron Age II, Lower Galilee was part of the Kingdom of Israel, which fell to the Assyrian Empire in the 8th century BCE. The Assyrians expelled the local Israelite population, leading to the region's depopulation. Archaeological evidence shows that the number of settlements in Lower Galilee plummeted from 60 before 733/732 BCE to zero, remaining uninhabited for centuries. It was only during the Persian period that the area was resettled, with 30 known settlements established.

== Gallery ==
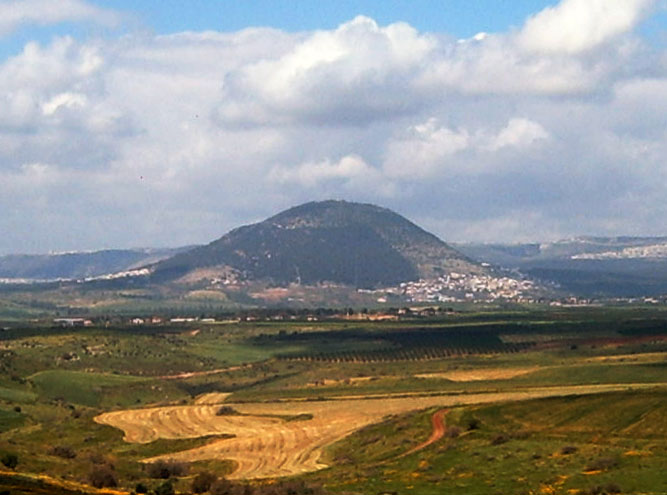
Mount Tabor

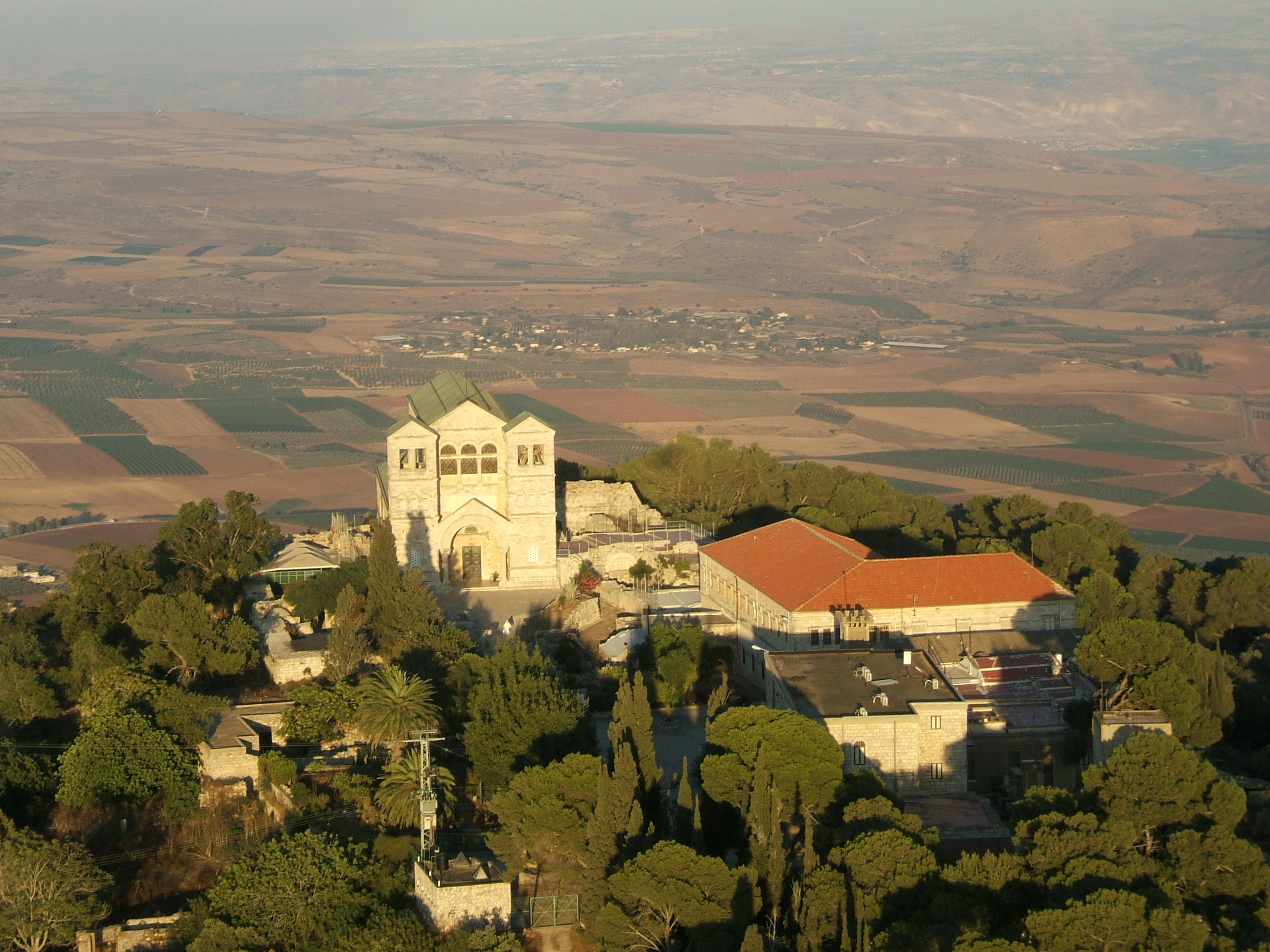
Church of the Transfiguration

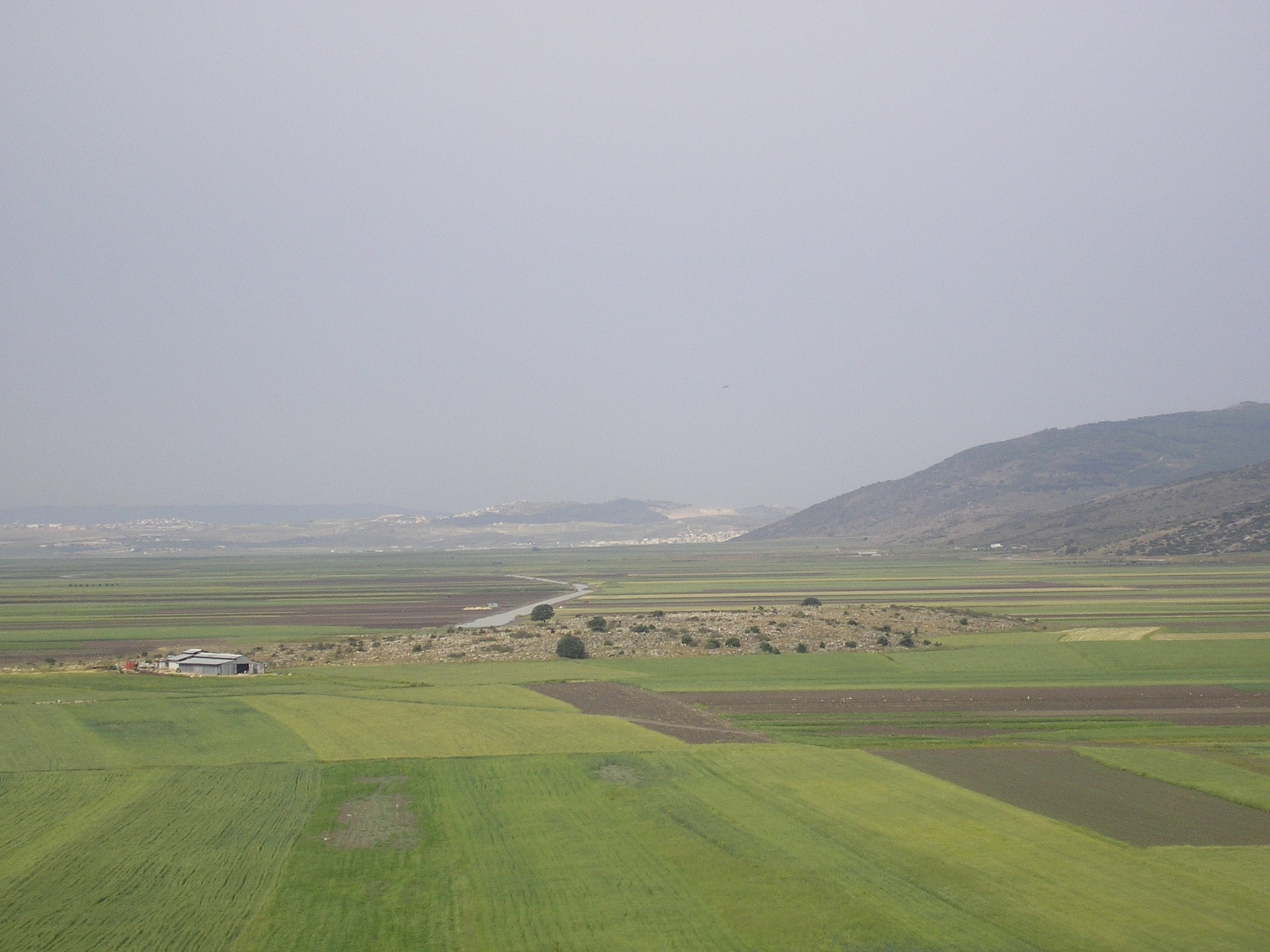
Beit Netofa Valley

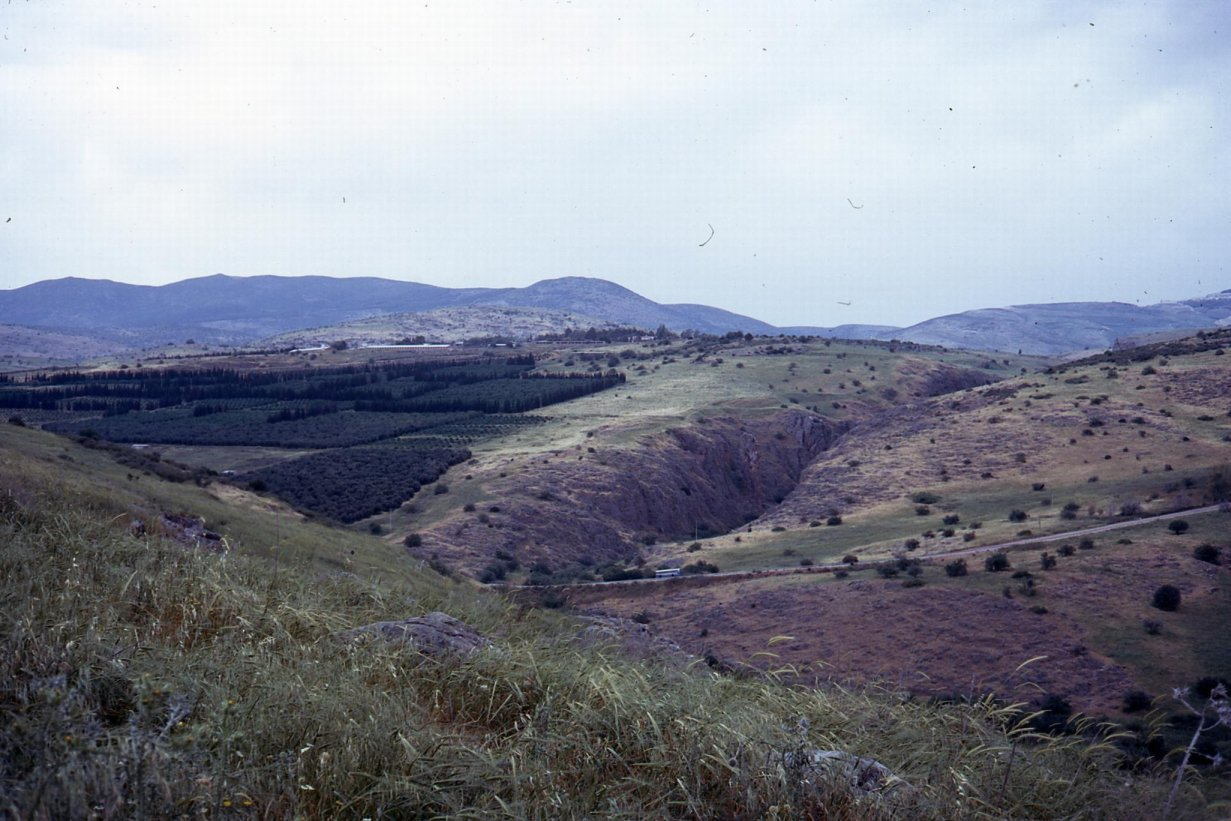
Nahal Amud

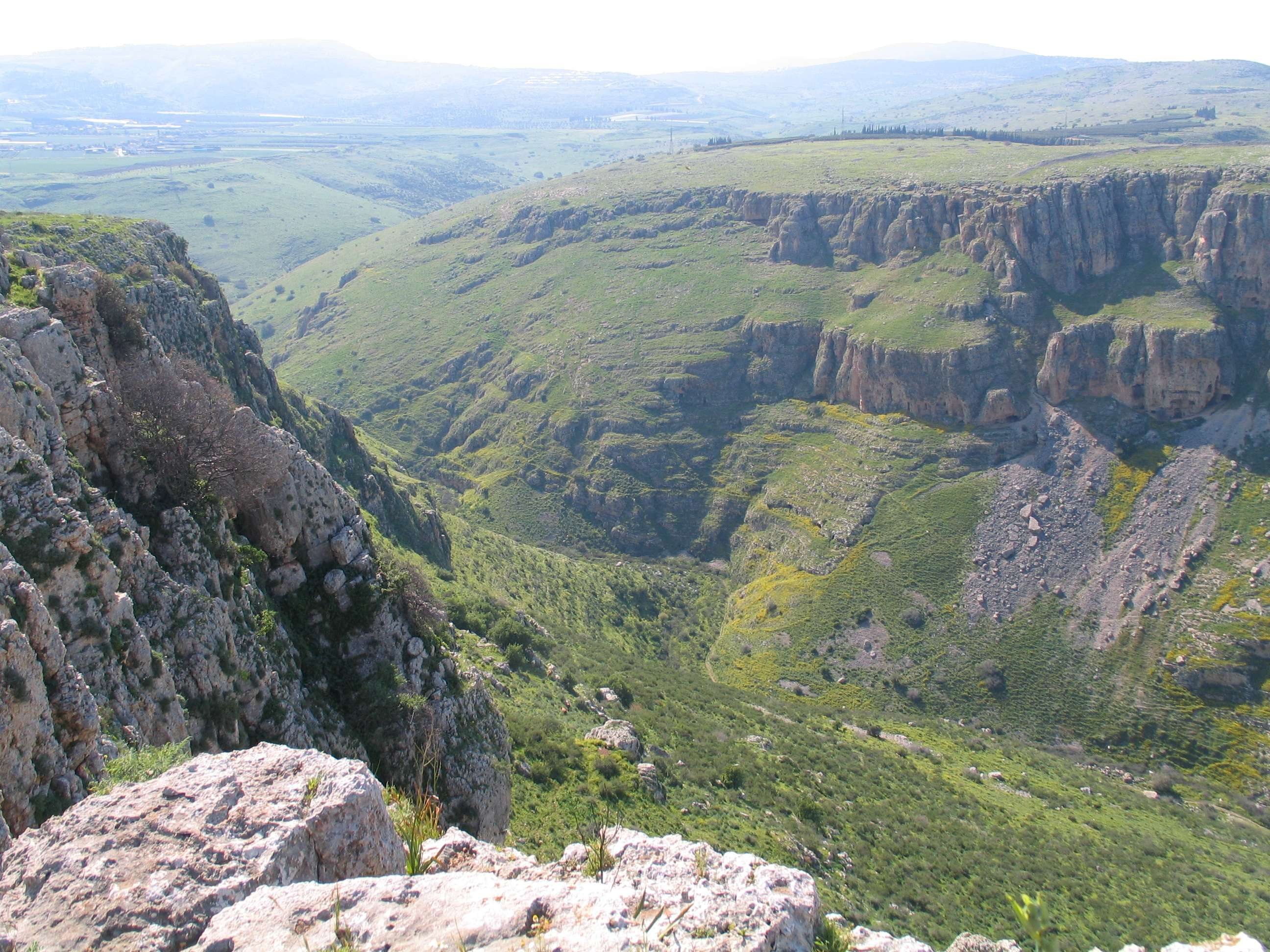
Mount Arbel

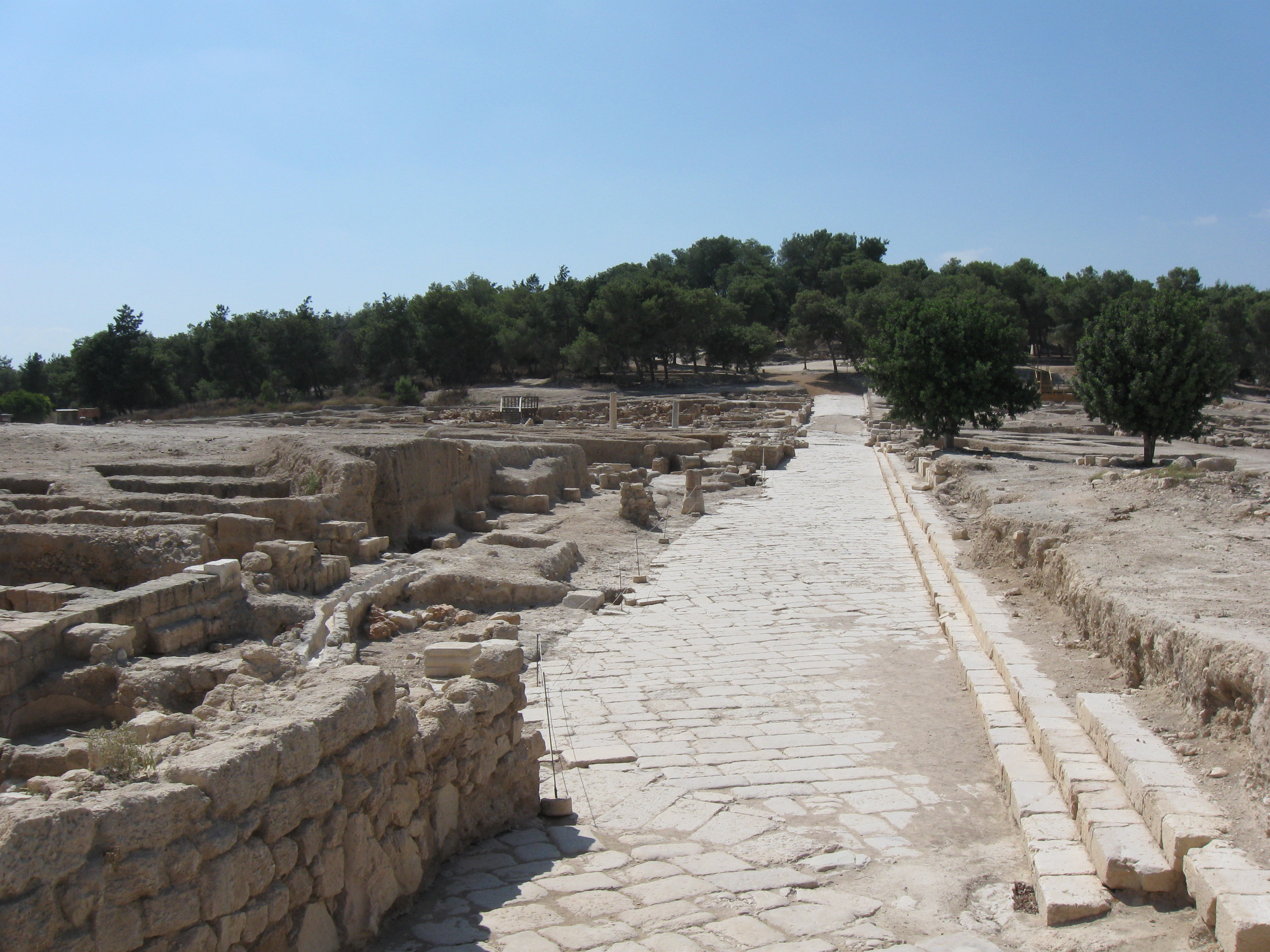
Sepphoris ruins

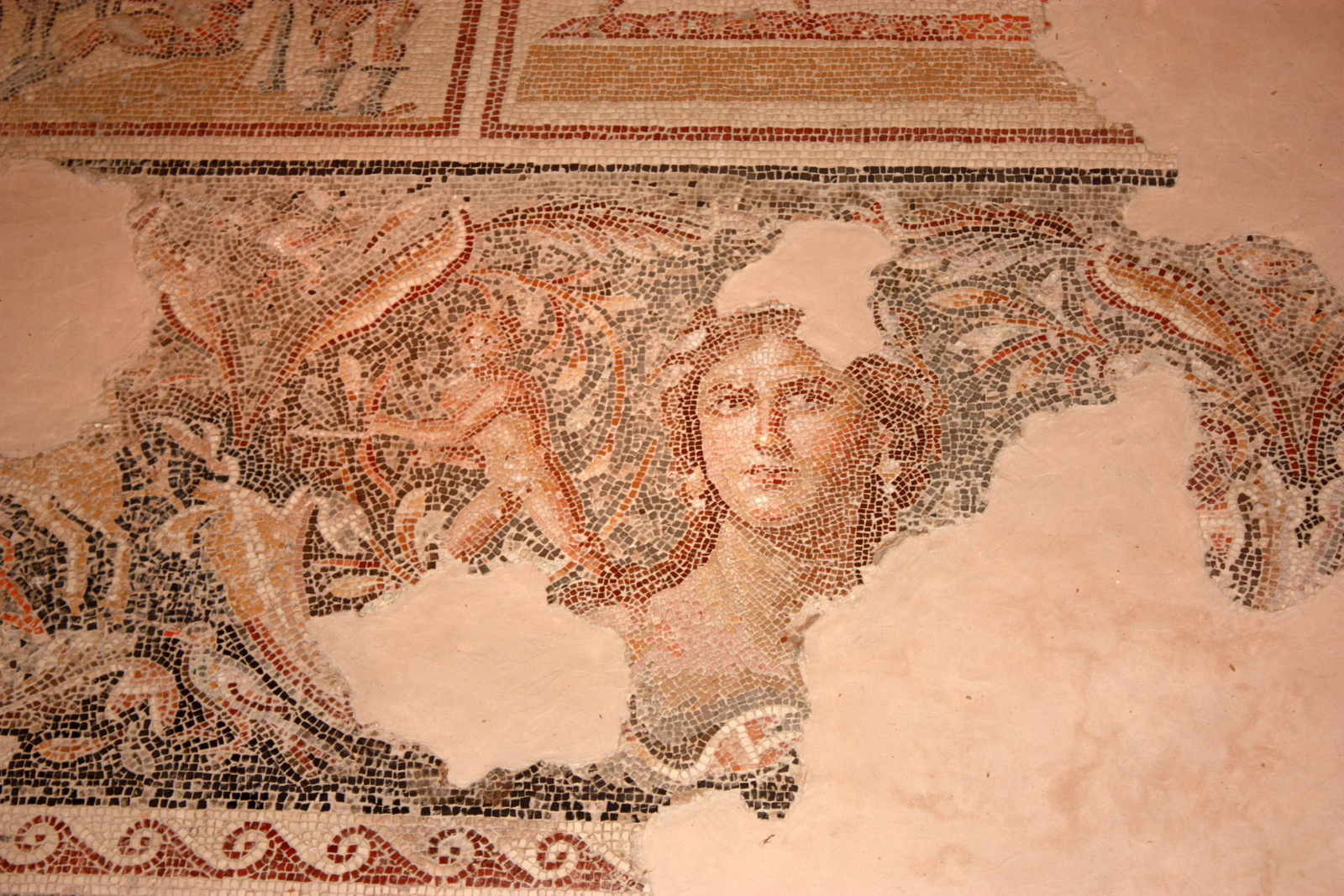
The "Mona Lisa of the Galilee" mosaic in Sepphoris

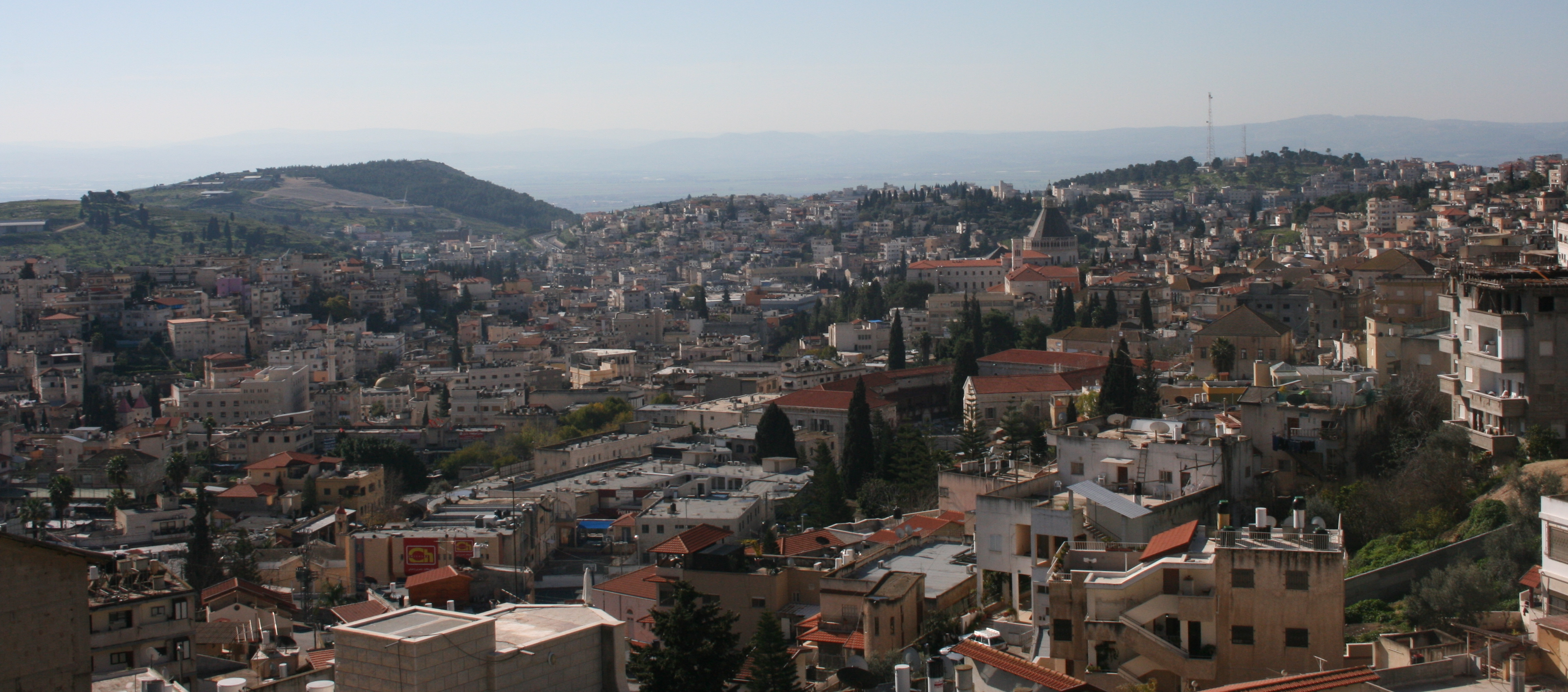
Nazareth

== See also ==
- Galilee
- Northern District (Israel)
- Lower Galilee Regional Council
- Upper Galilee
