= Garis (Galilee) =

Former village in Israel

- כפר עריס (Hebrew)

Site notes
- Condition: Ruined

Garis (Hebrew: כפר עריס),(Greek: Γαρεις; Γάρις), alternative spellings Garsis; Garisme, was a Jewish village in Lower Galilee, situated ca. 4 km. from Sepphoris. The village, although now a ruin, features prominently in the writings of Josephus, where it served temporarily as the place of residence for Josephus during the First Jewish Revolt. In the early stages of the war, Josephus, with the Galileans who were put under his command, cast up a bank around the village, in anticipation of a Roman assault upon the town.

And indeed this sight of the general (Vespasian) brought many to repent at their revolt, and put them all into a consternation; for those that were in Josephus's camp, which was at the city called Garis, not far from Sepphoris, when they heard that the war was come near them, and that the Romans would suddenly fight them hand to hand, dispersed themselves and fled....

== Etymology ==
The Hebrew name of the village is said to have been ʻAris (עריס), having the connotation of "trellised vine"; "grape arbor"; "espalier." The Greek word used in this toponym is Γαρεις, the Gamma said to be of the same ancient usage as found in Greek transliterations of the Hebrew words Gaza = עזה and Gabara = ערב.

== Identification ==
Historical geographers are divided as to the site's location. Samuel Klein thought that the ancient village of Garis was to be identified with Khirbet Cana, a ruin about 4 kilometres (2.5 mi) east of Sepphoris and which now bears the same name as the adjacent village of Cana (Kafr Kanna), although intrinsically different. Klein was the first to identify its Hebrew name with Kefar ʻArīs (כפר עריס) mentioned in the Tosefta (Kelim Baba-Metsia 11:2). Victor Guérin thought that the site of Garis was to be identified with Tell Bedeiwîyeh ("the mound of the Bedouins"), now a large mound with ruins of a small Khân and a well at its foot, located ca. 4 kilometres (2.5 mi) northwest of Sepphoris. Likewise, the historian and archaeologist, Nikos Kokkinos, surmised that it may have been the ruin Tel Hannaton, being the same place as described by Guérin under its Arabic name, Tell Bedeiwîyeh. William F. Albright held a differing view, thinking that Tell Bedeiwîyeh was the ancient town of Asochis.

Near Kafr Kanna, archaeologists have identified the remains of a Roman-period settlement now known as Karm er-Rās (Arabic: كرم الراس) immediately joining the western edge of Kafr Kanna. Karm (كرم) in Arabic denotes "vineyard," and is derived from the Aramaic word karma, a name which may have been a calque, connected with the above-mentioned site of "Garis" = "trellised vine."

== Gallery ==
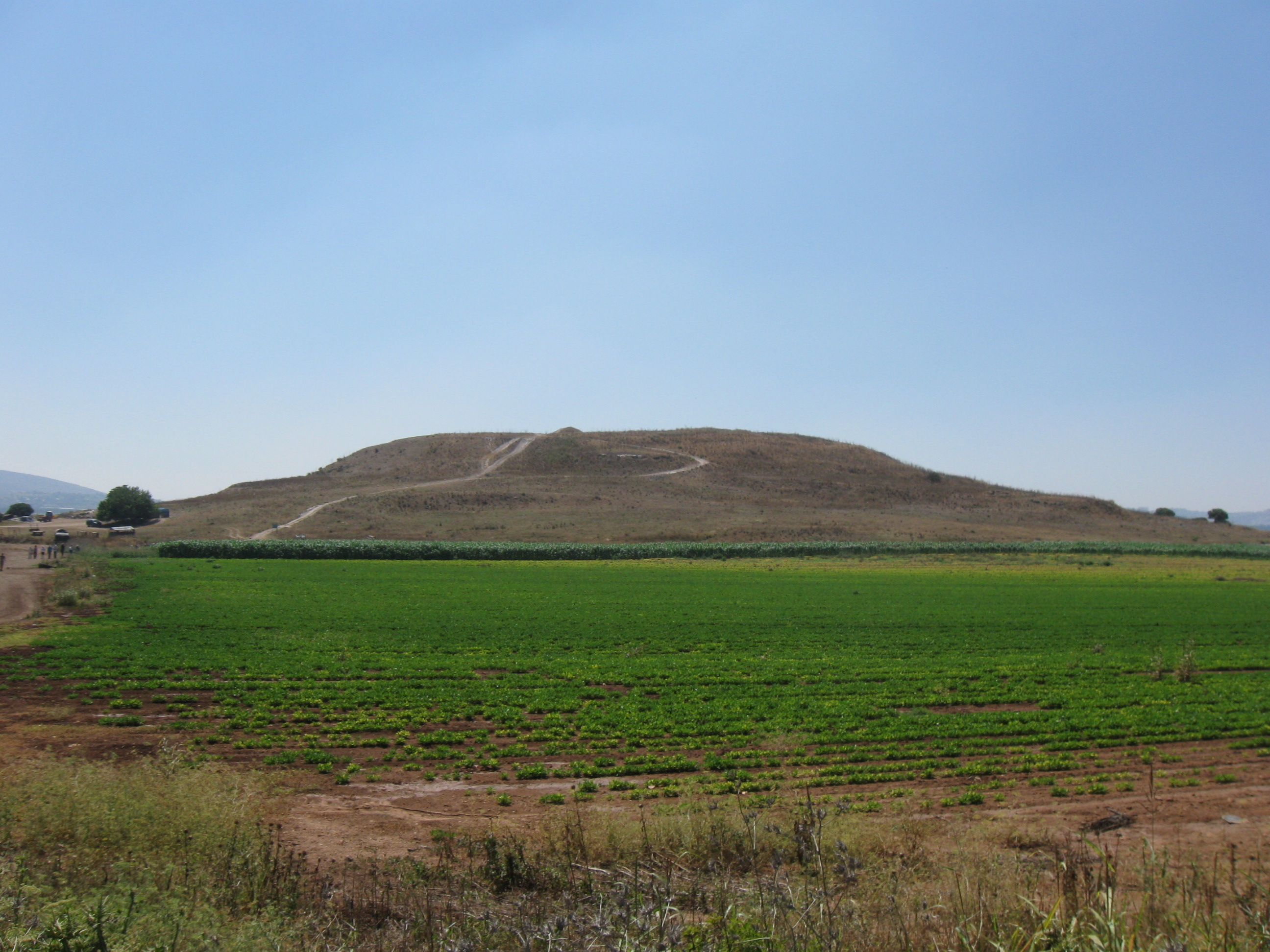
Ruin of Tell Bedeiwîyeh (Tel Hannaton)

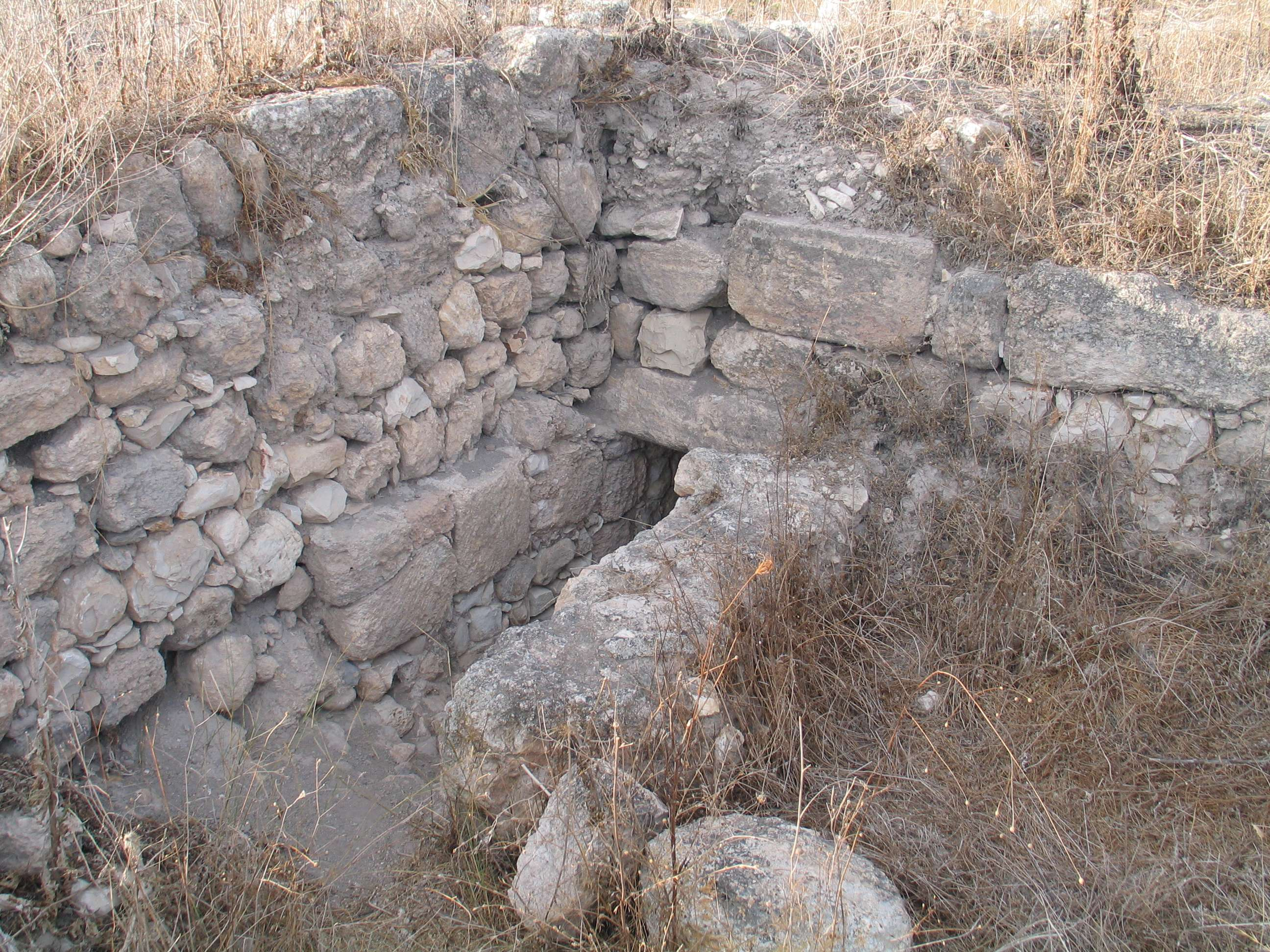
Tell Bedeiwîyeh (Tel Hannaton)

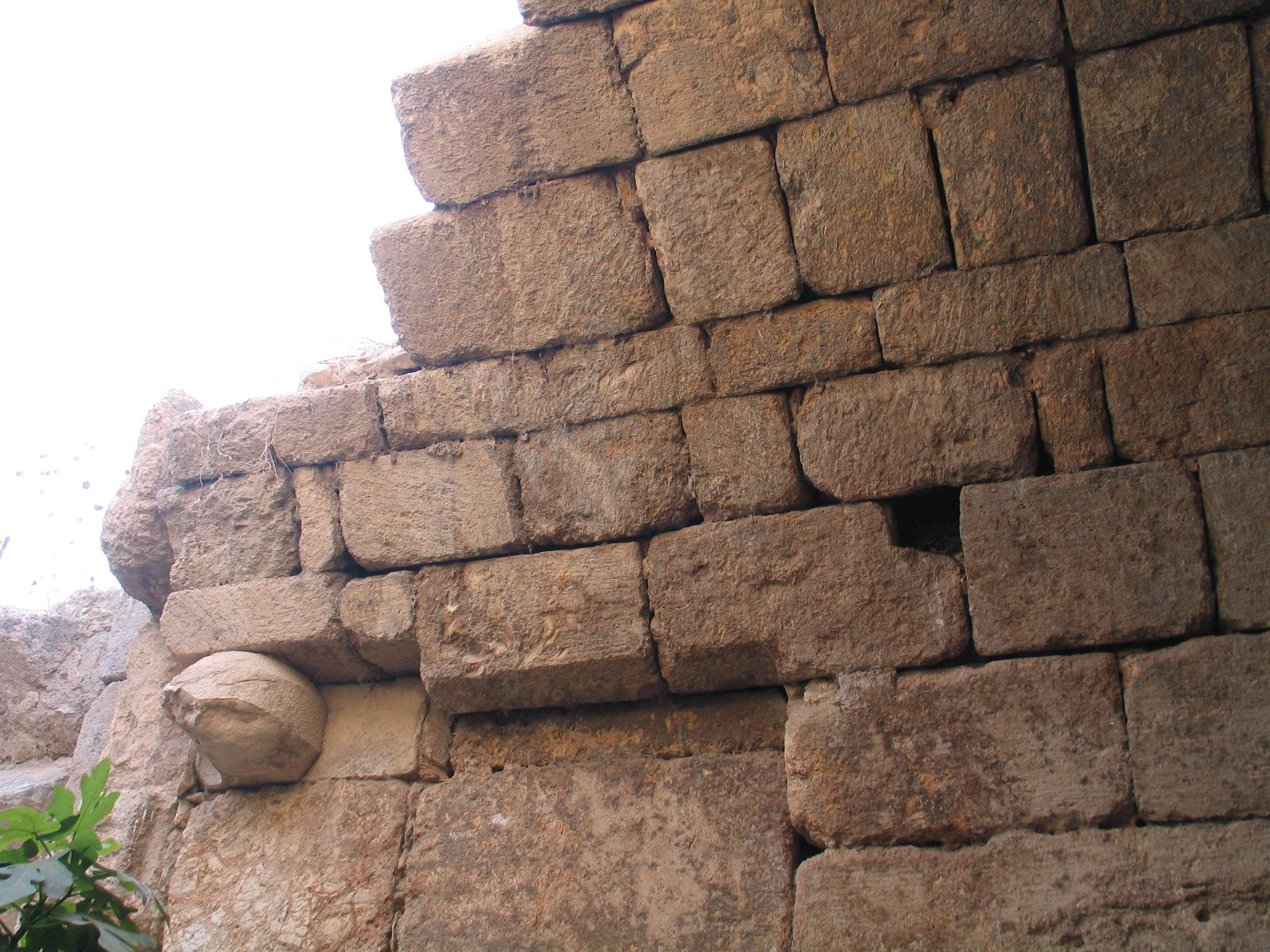
Stone structure at Tell Bedeiwîyeh

== Bibliography ==
- Abramsky, Y., ed. (2002). Tosefta with the Commentary Ḥazon Yeḥezḳel (in Hebrew). Vol. 6 (Seder Tohorot). Jerusalem: Bene ha-meḥaber. p. 180. OCLC 741496655., s.v. Kelim Baba-Metsia 11:1 (published post-mortem)
- Albright, W.F. (1921–22). "Contribution to the Historical Geography of Palestine". The Annual of the American Schools of Oriental Research. 2–3. New Haven: Yale University Press: 1–46. doi:10.2307/3768450. JSTOR 3768450.
- Avi-Yonah, M. (1976). "Gazetteer of Roman Palestine". Qedem. 5. Institute of Archaeology, Hebrew University of Jerusalem: 3–112. JSTOR 43587090.
- Guérin, V. (1880). Description Géographique Historique et Archéologique de la Palestine (in French). Vol. 1: Galilée, pt. 1. Paris: L'Imprimerie Nationale.
- Jastrow, M., ed. (2006), Dictionary of the Targumim, the Talmud Babli and Yerushalmi, and the Midrashic Literature, Peabody, Mass.: Hendrickson Publishers, OCLC 614562238
- Josephus (1957). The Jewish War. Vol. 3. Translated by Henry St. John Thackeray. Cambridge, Mass. / London: Harvard University Press / William Heinemann Ltd. OCLC 715796270., s.v. War 3.6.3 (3.129) (Loeb Classical Library)
- Josephus (1926). Vita. Vol. 1. Translated by Henry St. John Thackeray. London - New York: William Heinemann / G.P. Putnam's Sons. p. 151. OCLC 645232360. (Loeb Classical Library
- Klein, Samuel (1930). "Notes on Topography". Tarbiẕ (in Hebrew). Mandel Institute for Jewish Studies: 127–131. JSTOR 23580527.
- Kokkinos, Nikos (2010). "The Location of Tarichaea: North or South of Tiberias?". Palestine Exploration Quarterly. 142 (1): 7–23. doi:10.1179/003103209X12483454548167. S2CID 161794831.
- Krašovec, Jože (2009). Rofé, A.; Segal, M.; Talmon, S.; Talshir, Z. (eds.). "Phonetic Factors in Transliteration of Biblical Proper Names into Greek and Latin". Textus - Studies of the Hebrew University Bible Project. 24. The Hebrew University, Magnes Press: 25–26. OCLC 761216587.
