= Khirbet Qana =

Archaeological site in Upper Galilee, Israel

Coordinates: 32.821367°N 35.303278°E

- חורבת קנה (Hebrew) خربة قانا (Arabic)
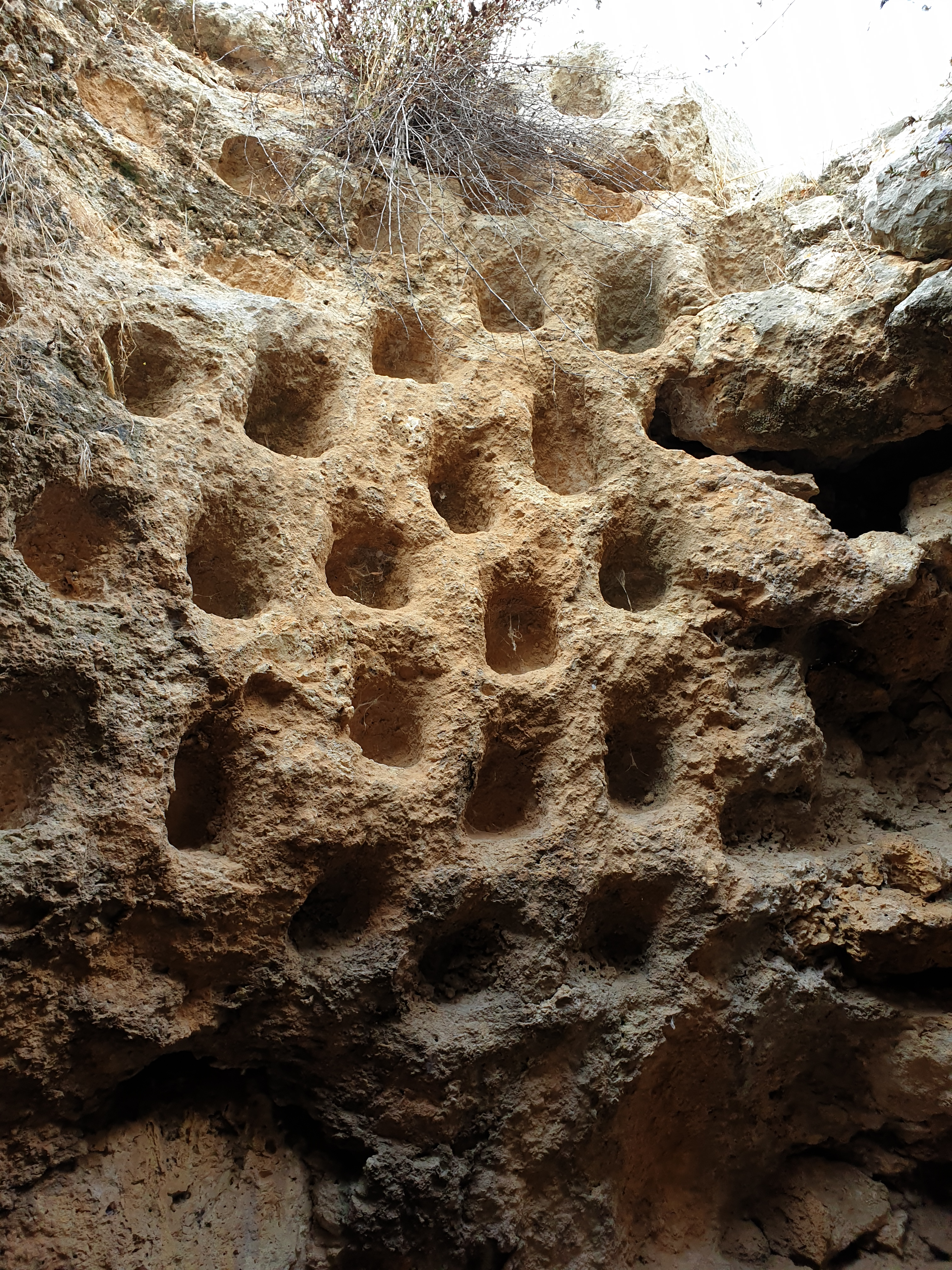
- Columbarium at Khirbet Qana

- Location within Israel
- Type: Settlement
- Cultures: Judaism
- Associated with: Jews
- Location: Israel
- Region: Galilee

Site notes
- Condition: Ruined
- Owner: Public
- Public access: Yes

Khirbet Qana (Arabic: خربة قانا), is an archaeological site in the Lower Galilee of Israel. It has remains of a settlement from the Hellenistic period to the Early Arab period. Findings including Hasmonean coins and ostraca using the Jewish script indicate its population in ancient times was predominantly Jewish.

Khirbet Qana has been identified with the ancient village of Cana, site of Wedding at Cana of the New Testament, and referenced by Josephus. Over the years, various locations such as Kafr Kanna in Galilee and Qana in Lebanon have also been proposed as Cana. However, recent excavations have established Khirbet Qana as the most likely site.

== Identification with biblical Cana ==
Khirbet Qana (grid: 178/247) is one of the locations in Galilee that researchers consider as a possibility for the biblical town of Cana, where Jesus turned water into wine at the Wedding at Cana. Crusader maps have been cited as evidence, as they identify Khirbet Qana with the biblical Cana. The writings of Burchard of Mount Sion have also linked Khirbet Qana with Cana. By the Middle Ages, texts from Christian pilgrims reveal Khirbet Qana was associated with the biblical Cana during that period, including the account of the English merchant Saewulf in the 12th century.

In the 17th century, Francesco Quaresmio concluded that Kafr Kanna was the biblical Cana, as it had a church, while Khirbet Qana did not. However, the fact that the main road from Sepphoris to Tiberias passed Kafr Kanna rather than Khirbet Qana, may have been a factor in this decision. Historical geographer, Samuel Klein, also thought that the ancient Cana was to be identified with the Arab village of Kafr Kanna, but that the nearby ruin of Khirbet Qana (which bears the same name) was actually a different village, which Klein thought to be Kefar 'Aris (Heb. כפר עריס) mentioned in the Tosefta (Kelim Baba-Metsia 11:2), and said to be mentioned by Josephus in The Jewish War under the name Garis, a town situated not far from Sepphoris. The Greek word used in this toponym is Greek: Γαρεις, the Gamma said to be of the same ancient usage as found in Greek transcriptions of Gaza = עזה and Gabara = ערב. The ruin is situated about 4 kilometres (2.5 mi) east of Sepphoris. Today, scholars are again focusing on Khirbet Qana as the site for the biblical Cana.

== Description of excavation site ==
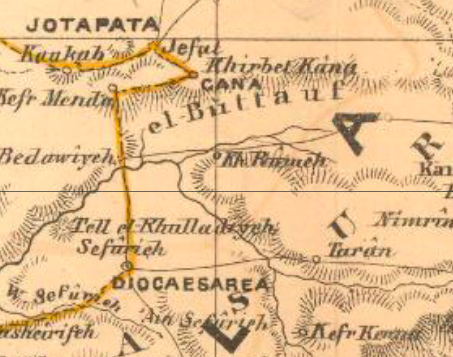
Map illustrating the location of Cana at Khirbet Qana (top), with Kefr Kenna (bottom), according to Edward Robinson's 1841 Biblical Researches in Palestine. Robinson wrote that "The monks of the present day, and all recent travellers, find the Cana of the New Testament, where Jesus converted the water into wine, at Kefr Kenna... Now as far as the prevalence of an ancient name among the common people, is any evidence for the identity of an ancient site, — and I hold it to be the strongest of all testimony, when, as here, not subject to extraneous influences, but rather in opposition to them, — so far is the weight of evidence in favour of this northern Kana el-Jelil, as the true site of the ancient Cana of Galilee. The name is identical, and stands the same in the Arabic version of the New Testament; while the form Kefr Kenna can only be twisted by force into a like shape".

Khirbet Qana is located on a 100-meter hill, on the north side of Beth Netofa valley. Excavations have shown that Khirbet Qana was used as a settlement from the Hellenistic to the Early Arab period, with housing in use from the Hellenistic period through the Byzantine period. Khirbet Qana was a densely populated, but small, rural village that relied mainly on agriculture.

Excavations at Khirbet Qana have revealed that the unwalled city was partially built into the area's hillsides, resulting in terraced houses on the hill, with larger houses arranged around a courtyard in the flatter areas. Researchers have identified 3 types of houses at Khirbet Qana; terraced housing, side courtyard houses, and central courtyard houses. Terraced houses were located on the steep eastern and western slopes of the hill, while side courtyard houses were located in the flatter area to the north. Courtyard houses were located in the flattest areas of the village, on the hilltop, and featured large central courtyards.

In addition to residential housing, Khirbet Qana includes a Jewish synagogue, a later Byzantine complex (possibly a “veneration cave”), and a series of tombs. There is also some evidence of a monumental building of some kind on the hilltop, perhaps a synagogue, at which a fragment of fresco was found during the excavations of the site.

== Christianity ==
In addition to the Jewish synagogue, there is evidence of a Christian place of worship in the form of a “veneration cave” which is a series of four connected caves. The main cave has plaster walls and floors, which include graffiti and inscriptions, of which some are Christian. The main cave also features benches along the walls, and a possible altar on the north side of the cave, which is partially formed by a sarcophagus lid that features at least one cross. Plastered in place atop the sarcophagus lid were at least two stone vessels, with one still in situ, while the imprint of the second vessel remains in the plaster. Carbon dating from inside the caves associated with Christian worship have revealed that the main cave underwent renovation during the period of the Crusades- a bench was added to the west side of the cave, the floor was plastered, and the walls were re-plastered. This period, which carbon dating dates from 1024 to 1217 would have been the last phase of considerable use. The altar or table made of the sarcophagus lid with the two stone vessels on its top, along with the carbon dating which places the major renovations at the time of the Crusaders, provide some evidence that the cave complex may have been used as a reliquary to celebrate Jesus's turning of water into wine.

== Artifacts ==
Both coins and pottery shards have been found in the excavations of Khirbet Qana. The coins found at Khirbet Qana are Hasmonean. One particular pottery shard found at the site, a fragment of a cooking pot, proved to be an ostracon in Aramaic, which is considered to be the language spoken in the region of Galilee at the time of Jesus. The ostracon contains three letters in the Jewish script, dating back to the late first or early second century AD, featuring the letters ב,ג,ד. As per the publisher, this marks the first occurrence of an abecedarium in a Jewish village in the Galilee, potentially linked to a scribal exercise or a form of magical incantation.

== Industry ==
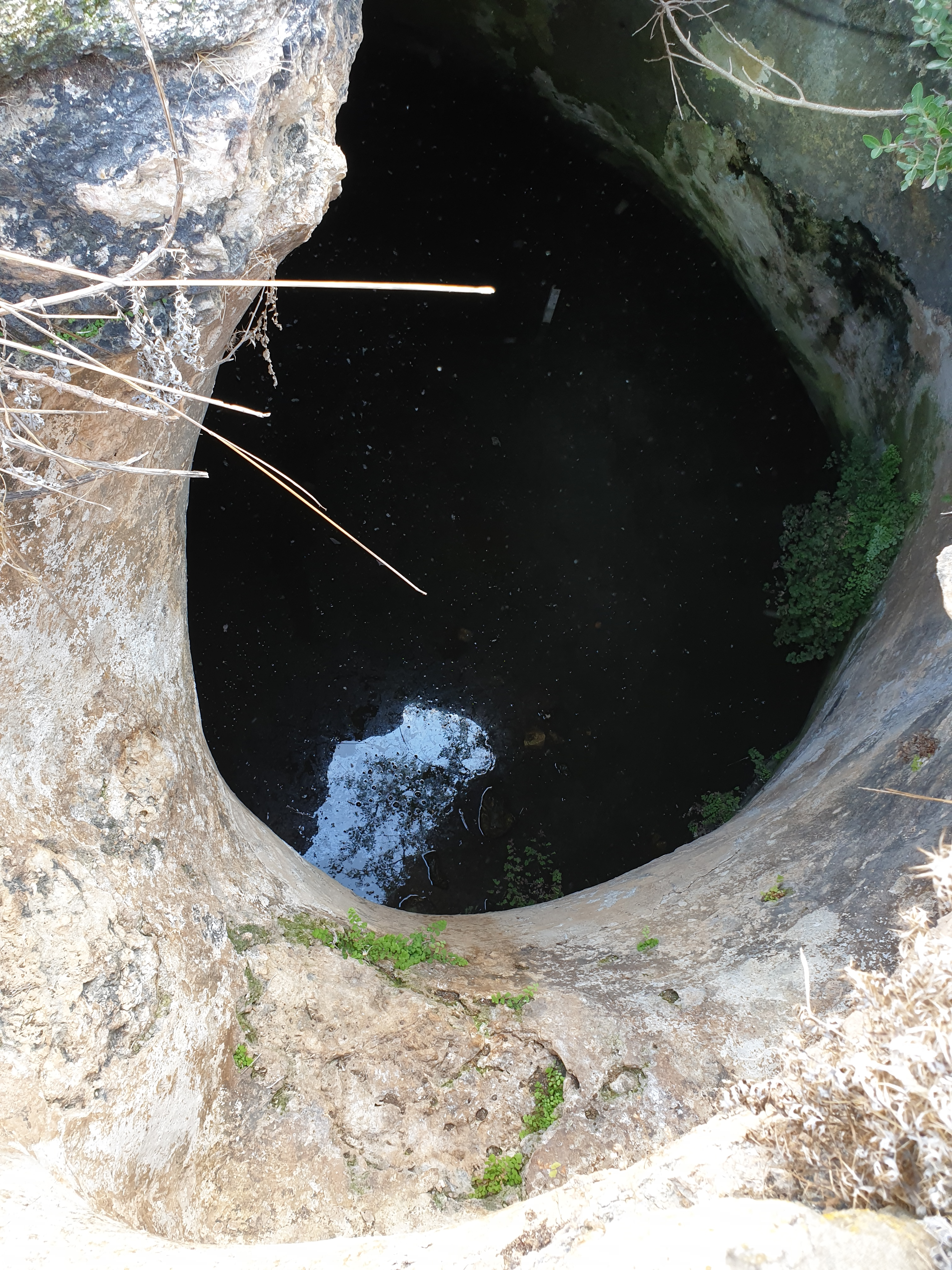
Khirbet Qana - Waterhole

Industrial buildings were found on the outskirts of the town, including facilities for breeding doves, olive presses, fabric dying, and glass making. Over 60 cisterns for water storage have been found throughout the excavation site as well.

Pottery found at Khirbet Qana from nearby Shikhin and Kefar Hananya show that trade at Khirbet Kana would have been largely local or regional. Fields for cultivation on the west side of Khirbet Qana, along with tax records detailing taxes on crops from the 16th century serve as evidence that Khirbet Qana relied in part on agriculture.

== Inhabitants ==
The excavations of both a Jewish Synagogue and a Christian place of pilgrimage and worship reveal that Khirbet Qana was an important location for both religious groups, with a population of primarily Jewish inhabitants in earlier periods, such as the Roman and Hellenistic periods. Coins found at the site serve as evidence that the Khirbet Qana was under Maccabean influence by the 1st century BC, though at this time no Maccabean buildings have been found at the site. During the period of the Crusades, Christian pilgrims visited Khirbet Qana, though it is unclear if they ever lived there.

== In later years ==
A lack of coinage from the late 4th to early 5th centuries may indicate a decline in Khirbet Qana, but the town shows signs of expansion and growth during the Late Byzantine period (late 5th to 7th centuries). The latest date for a coin found at Khirbet Qana is 613, and it was likely abandoned during the first half of the 7th century, during which time Galilee underwent invasion (614) and re-conquest (628) from Persia, prior to the Arab conquest (639). The acropolis at Khirbet Qana, however, was again occupied most likely from the late 7th century through the early 8th century, as evidenced by Arab pottery found across the area, as well as renovations to the public building on the acropolis, and an early Islamic fragment of pottery.
