= Reineh =

Reineh: רֵינָה, ריינה; الرينة
- Local council (from 1968)

Hebrew transcription(s)
  - ISO 259: Réina
  - Also spelled: Reine (official)
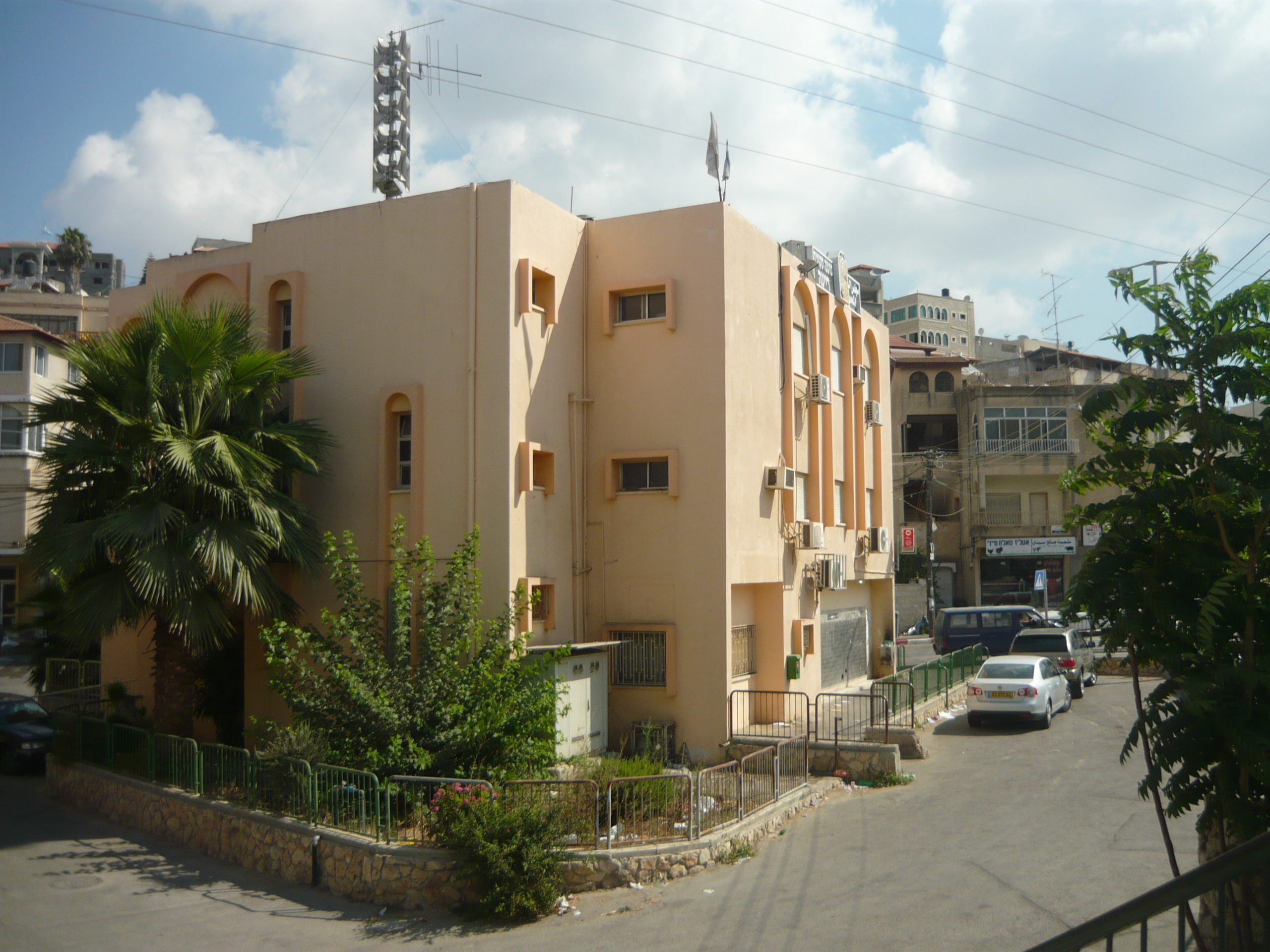
- Reineh local council building

- Location within Israel Reineh (Israel)
- Coordinates: 32°43′20″N 35°18′55″E
- NIG PG: 229/736; 179/236
- Country: Israel
- District: Northern
- Subdistrict: Jezreel
- Natural Region: Nazareth-Tir'an Mountains

Area
  - Total: 10,902 dunams (10.902 km^{2}; 4.209 sq mi)

Population (2024)
  - Total: 20,653
  - Density: 1,894.4/km^{2} (4,906.5/sq mi)

Ethnicity
  - Arabs: 99.9%
  - Jews and others: 0.1%

Reineh (Arabic: الرينة; Hebrew: רֵינָה) is an Arab town in northern Israel. Located in the Galilee, between Nazareth and Qana of Galilee, it attained local council status in 1968. In 2024 it had a population of 20,653, the majority of whom are Muslims (85%), with a significant Christian minority (15%).

== History ==
Archaeological remains dating from the Middle Bronze Age, Persian period (fifth–fourth centuries BCE), Hellenistic (second century BCE), Early and Middle Roman period (first century BCE and second century CE) Byzantine, early Islamic period, Crusader and Mamluk have been found here.

A 2,000-year-old Jewish workshop for creating stone vessels has been unearthed in Reineh. It dates to the Roman period. The analysis of the site and its artifacts suggests a rigorous adherence to purity laws among Galilean Jews, akin to the practices of Jews of Judea.

Pottery imported from Syria and Italy in the 14th–16th century CE found here, indicate that the village had a strong economy in the Mamluk period.

=== Ottoman period ===
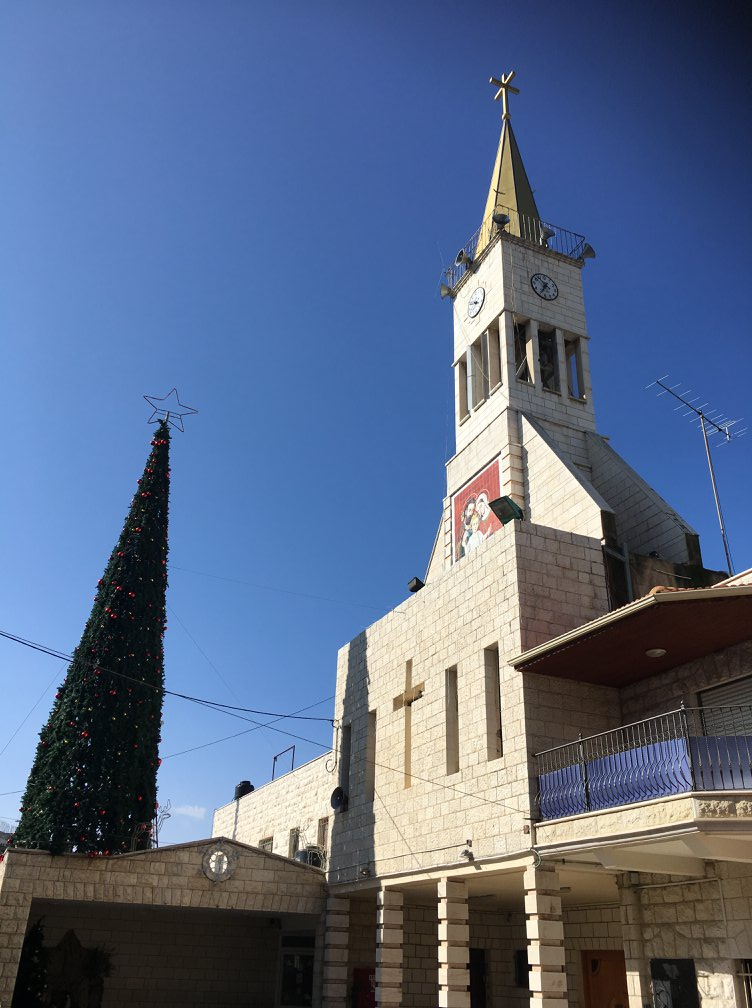
St. Joseph Worker Church in Reineh

In 1517, the village was included in the Ottoman Empire with the rest of Palestine, and in the 1596 tax-records it appeared as Rayna, located in the Nahiya of Tabariyya of the Liwa Safad. The taxable population was 151; 139 families and 6 bachelors; all Muslim, in addition to 6 Christian families. They paid taxes for various agricultural products; 5200 akçe on wheat, 2100 on barley, 350 on fruit trees, 200 on vegetable and fruit gardens, 250 on goats and beehives, in addition to 900 for occasional revenues and 480 for Jizya. Archaeological remains from the early Ottoman era have also been found here. A map from Napoleon's invasion of 1799 by Pierre Jacotin showed the place, named as El Raineh. In 1806, Seetzen noted a spring in the village (which he called Reni), whose inhabitant were half Muslim, half "Greek Christians".

In 1838; the population of Reineh was described as being Greek Orthodox Christians and Sunni Muslim, and in 1852 a "Greek" church was noted in Reineh.

In 1875 Victor Guérin noted: "On 22 June, after a day resting up at Nazareth, I set out on my march again at 5 am, heading northeast, then north northeast. At 5.33 am, I passed by a copious spring, called A'in er Reineh. Next to the small pool that catches its flow, an ancient sarcophagus has been placed, in the form of a trough, the external parts of which tank are elegantly sculptured with whorls and garlands. This spring waters gardens planted with fig and pomegranate trees. The village of Reineh stretches over the southern slopes of the hill it abuts. It contains approximately 800 residents, half of them Muslims and the other half schismatic Greeks, with some Protestants as well. The reason for the latter is that an English mission has been active here for some years and established a local school."

In 1881, the PEF's Survey of Western Palestine (SWP) described it: "A large village of well-built houses, containing about 500 Christians and Moslems. There are two springs south of the village; one, called 'Ain Kana. It is surrounded by arable ground and olive-groves. There is a church in the village."

A population list from about 1887 showed that Reineh had about 1150 inhabitants; half Muslims and half Christians.

=== British Mandatory period ===
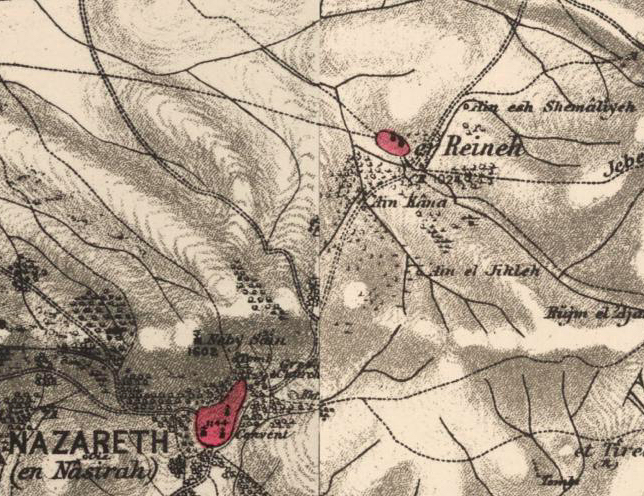
Reineh in the 1870 PEF Survey of Palestine, showing Ain Kana, identified by Claude Reignier Conder as the location of biblical Cana.

In the Mandatory Palestine, at the 1922 census of Palestine, Reineh had a population of 787; 423 Christians and 364 Muslims. Among the Christians, 203 were Greek Orthodox, 87 Roman Catholics, 101 Greek Catholic (Melkites) and 32 Church of England. The population increased in the 1931 census to 1,015 residents living in 243 houses. The religious breakdown of the population was 389 Christians, 1 Jew and 625 Muslims.

The 1927 earthquake hit Reineh worse than the other villages in the area, and afterwards the Christians started rebuilding in the area called "New Reineh".

In the 1945 statistics Reineh (Er Reina) had a population of 1,290; 500 Christians and 790 Muslims. The total land area was 16,029 dunams; 15,899 owned by Arabs and the rest, 130 dunams, were public land. Of this, 915 were allocated for plantations and irrigable land, 10,451 for cereals, 10 for citrus and bananas, while 139 dunams were classified as built-up (urban) areas.

=== 1948–1949 ===
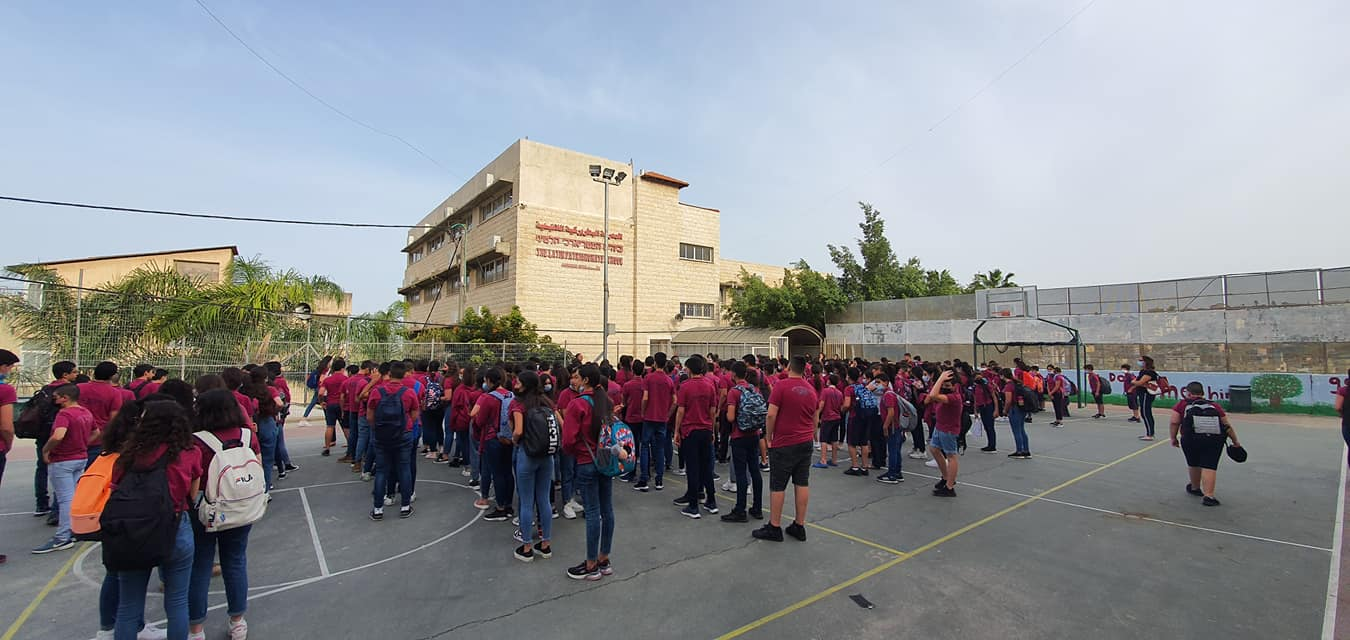
The catholic Latin patriarchal school in Reineh.

Reineh was conquered by Israeli forces in July 1948, during Operation Dekel. In September, 14 Arab residents were reportedly murdered by Israeli authorities after they had been detained near the village, brought into Reineh and accused of smuggling. The victims included a young Bedouin woman, and Yusuf al-Turki, a member of the "Land of Israel Workers Alliance".

In December 1948/January 1949 it was proposed that Saffuriya's remaining inhabitants be moved to Reineh, as their "neighbouring [Jewish] settlements coveted Saffuriya lands". When the Saffuriya inhabitants were expelled by the Israelis in January 1949, 14 were expelled to Lebanon, while the rest went to Nazareth, 'Illut, Kafr Kanna and Reineh.

== Demographics ==
Historical population
Year	Pop.	±%
1972	4,000	—
1983	7,200	+80.0%
1995	12,100	+68.1%
2008	17,100	+41.3%
2022	17,046	−0.3%
2024	20,654	+21.2%

In 2022, 85.4% of the population was Muslim and 14.8% was Christian.

The Muslim families living in Reineh include: Al-Bassoul, Al-Zidan, Al-Jiyussi, Al-Khutba, Al-Zaroura, Al-Sbarja Arabs, Al-Saydi, Al-Tatur, Al-Asila – Al-Hashma, Al-Othmanah – Al-Othamla, Tatur, Al-Gharaba, Al-Maghariba (Al-Maghrabi) – Algerians, Al-Mu‘ammar, Al-Munasirah, Mansour, and Al-Mustrihi.

The Christians in Reineh belong to four denominations, the largest being the Eastern Orthodox Church, followed by the Melkite Catholic Church, the Latin Church, and the Anglican Church. The Christian families in Reineh include: Abu Hanna, Abu Khadra, Ayoub – Boulos, Bransi, Jubran, Khamis, Khouri, Rashid, Rawashdeh, Rizq, Al-Sakran, Al-Sayegh, Arram, Karim, Mazzawi, Muslim, Nawatheh, Nweesrah, and Worour.

== Archaeology ==
In Reineh, Israel, archaeologists uncovered a Jewish factory for producing stone vessels dating back to the Roman period. The site, which includes a chalk cave functioning as both a quarry and a workshop, provides evidence that Galilean Jewish communities adhered to purity laws with the same rigor as those in Judea. The site yielded numerous findings, such as stone cores and partially completed vessels, which are consistent with types used in Jewish ritual purification practices. The Reineh workshop is the fourth of its kind in Israel, with similar workshops found at Hizma and at Jebel Mukaber (both in the vicinity of Jerusalem) and another one close to Reineh.

The discovery of the workshop in Reineh contributed to the historical understanding of Jewish religious life in ancient Galilee. It suggests that the observance of purity laws, previously thought to be weaker in Galilee compared to Judea, was in fact similarly strict. This is supported by the production scale of stone vessels, which were preferred over pottery due to religious beliefs about purity derived from Levitical law.

=== Cana ===
In 1878 Claude Reignier Conder suggested that the small spring south of Reineh, named "Ain Kana", was the location of biblical Cana.

== Sports ==
The local football club, Maccabi Bnei Reineh F.C. is, as of the 2022/3 season in the Israeli Premier League.

== Voting Patterns ==
In the 2022 election, 95 percent of voters in Reineh voted for the Arab parties, while 2 percent voted for the parties of the center-left coalition led by Yair Lapid and 2 percent voted for the parties of the right-wing coalition led by Benjamin Netanyahu. Among the voters for the Arab parties, 39 percent voted for Balad, while 33 percent voted for the Hadash–Ta'al list and 29 percent voted for Ra'am.

In the 2026 election, 96 percent of voters in Reineh voted for the Arab parties, while 2 percent voted for the parties of the center-left coalition led by Gadi Eisenkot and 0.7 percent voted for the parties of the right-wing coalition led by Benjamin Netanyahu. Among the voters for the Arab parties, 68 percent voted for the Joint List, while 32 percent voted for Ra'am. Voter turnout increased 61 percent from the 2022 election.

== See also ==
- People from Reineh
- Arab localities in Israel

== Bibliography ==
- Barron, J. B., ed. (1923). Palestine: Report and General Abstracts of the Census of 1922. Government of Palestine – via Internet Archive.
- Bisharat, Eyad (2017-10-03). "Er-Reina". Hadashot Arkheologiyot – Excavations and Surveys in Israel (129).
- Conder, C.R. (1878). Tent Work in Palestine: A Record of Discovery and Adventure. Vol. I. R. Bentley & Son – via Internet Archive.
- Conder, C.R.; Kitchener, H. H. (1881). The Survey of Western Palestine: Memoirs of the Topography, Orography, Hydrography, and Archaeology. Vol. 1. London: Committee of the Palestine Exploration Fund – via Internet Archive.
- Dauphin, C. (1998). La Palestine byzantine, Peuplement et Populations. BAR International Series 726 (in French). Vol. III: Catalogue. Oxford: Archeopress. ISBN 0-860549-05-4. (p. 683)
- Department of Statistics (1945). Village Statistics, April, 1945. Government of Palestine.
- Guérin, V. (1880). Description Géographique Historique et Archéologique de la Palestine (in French). Vol. 3: Galilee, pt. 1. Paris: L'Imprimerie Nationale – via Internet Archive.
- Hadawi, S. (1970). Village Statistics of 1945: A Classification of Land and Area ownership in Palestine. Palestine Liberation Organization Research Center.
- Hütteroth, W.-D.; Abdulfattah, K. (1977). Historical Geography of Palestine, Transjordan and Southern Syria in the Late 16th Century. Erlanger Geographische Arbeiten, Sonderband 5. Erlangen, Germany: Vorstand der Fränkischen Geographischen Gesellschaft. ISBN 3-920405-41-2.
- Jaffe, Gilad Bezal'el (2012-12-31). "Er-Reina Final Report". Hadashot Arkheologiyot – Excavations and Surveys in Israel (124).
- Kapul, Reuven (2018-02-26). "Er-Reina". Hadashot Arkheologiyot – Excavations and Surveys in Israel (129).
- Karmon, Y. (1960). "An Analysis of Jacotin's Map of Palestine" (PDF). Israel Exploration Journal. 10 (3, 4): 155–173, 244–253. Archived from the original (PDF) on 2019-12-22.
- Mills, E., ed. (1932). Census of Palestine 1931. Population of Villages, Towns and Administrative Areas. Jerusalem: Government of Palestine – via Internet Archive.
- Mokary, Abdalla (2012-09-19). "Er-Reina Final Report". Hadashot Arkheologiyot – Excavations and Surveys in Israel (124).
- Morris, B. (2004). The Birth of the Palestinian Refugee Problem Revisited. Cambridge University Press. ISBN 978-0-521-00967-6.
- Neubauer, A. (1868). La géographie du Talmud: mémoire couronné par l'Académie des inscriptions et belles-lettres (in French). Paris: Lévy – via Internet Archive. (p. 277)
- Palmer, E. H. (1881). The Survey of Western Palestine: Arabic and English Name Lists Collected During the Survey by Lieutenants Conder and Kitchener, R. E. Transliterated and Explained by E.H. Palmer. Committee of the Palestine Exploration Fund – via Internet Archive. (p. 132)
- Robinson, E.; Smith, E. (1841). Biblical Researches in Palestine, Mount Sinai and Arabia Petraea: A Journal of Travels in the year 1838. Vol. 3. Boston: Crocker & Brewster – via Internet Archive.
- Robinson, E.; Smith, E. (1856). Later Biblical Researches in Palestine and adjacent regions: A Journal of Travels in the year 1852. London: John Murray.
- Schumacher, G. (1888). "Population list of the Liwa of Akka". Quarterly Statement – Palestine Exploration Fund. 20: 169–191 – via Internet Archive.
- Seetzen, U.J. (1854). Ulrich Jasper Seetzen's Reisen durch Syrien, Palästina, Phönicien, die Transjordan-länder, Arabia Petraea und Unter-Aegypten (in German). Vol. 2. Berlin: G. Reimer.
- Thomson, W.M. (1859). The Land and the Book: Or, Biblical Illustrations Drawn from the Manners and Customs, the Scenes and Scenery, of the Holy Land. Vol. 1 (1st ed.). New York: Harper & brothers – via Internet Archive. (p. 439)
- Zidan, Omar (2016-12-29). "Er-Reina (North), Highway 79". Hadashot Arkheologiyot – Excavations and Surveys in Israel (128).
