= Wasil Taha =

Arab-Israeli politician

- واصل طه
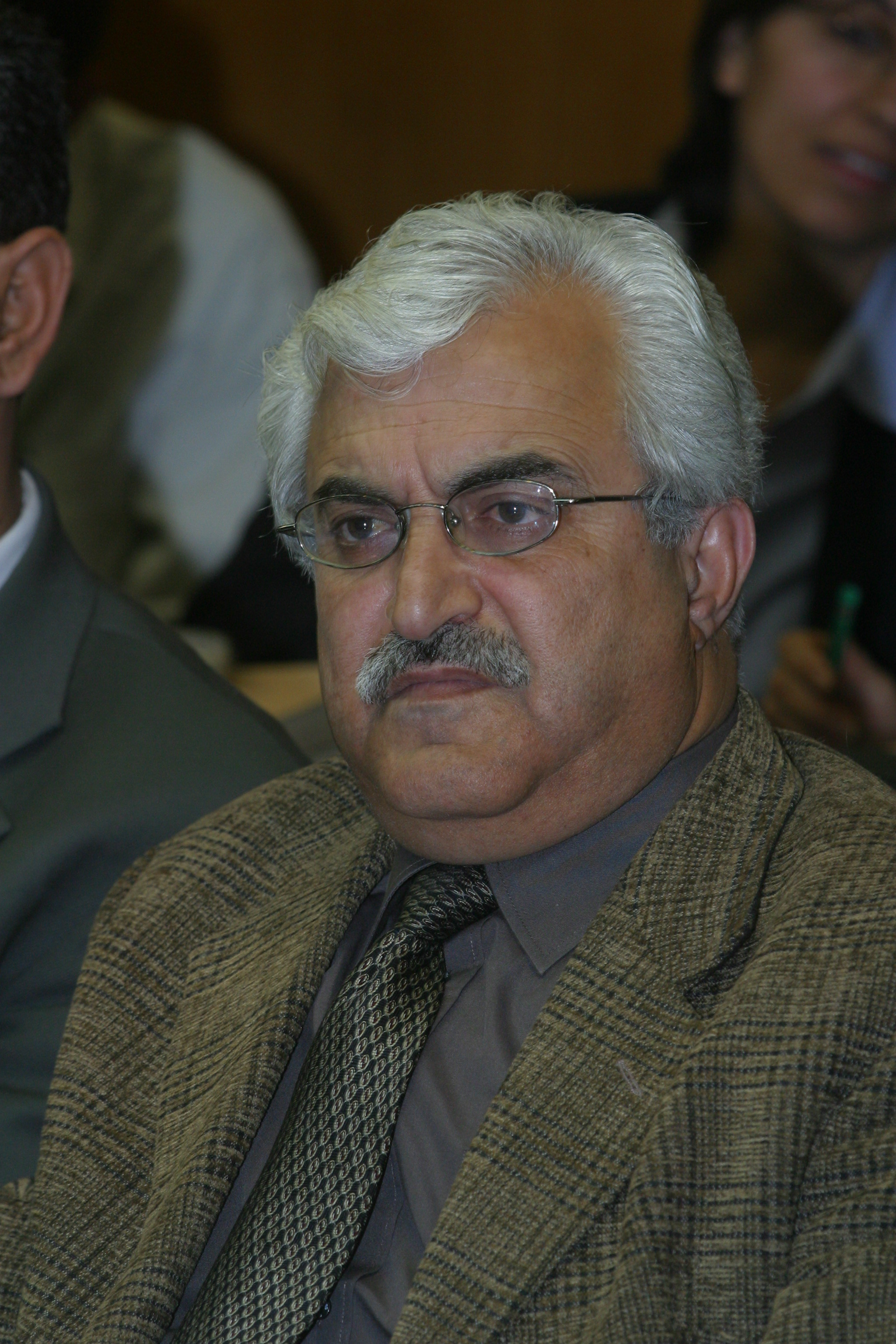

Faction represented in the Knesset
- 2003–2009: Balad

Personal details
- Born: Kafr Kanna, Israel

Wasil Taha (Arabic: واصل طه, Hebrew: וואסל טאהה) is an Israeli Arab politician and a former member of the Knesset for the Balad party.

== Biography ==
Born in Kafr Kanna in 1952, Taha studied Middle Eastern Studies at the University of Haifa, receiving a BA.

He was first elected to the Knesset in the 2003 elections on Balad's list and retained his seat in the 2006 elections. He caused controversy in July 2006 by stating that the abduction of IDF troops by Palestinian militants was a legitimate form of resistance. In December 2008, he announced that he would not run in the 2009 elections.

Taha still lives in Kafr Kanna and is married with four children.

== Quotes ==
- "Progress for Israel's Arabs depends on changing the entire discriminatory approach of the government over the past 58 years, and not on the appointment of a minister or deputy minister," on the appointment of Raleb Majadele as Minister without Portfolio in January 2007, Israel's first Arab minister.
