= Cana =

Historical place in Galilee

Possible locations of Cana

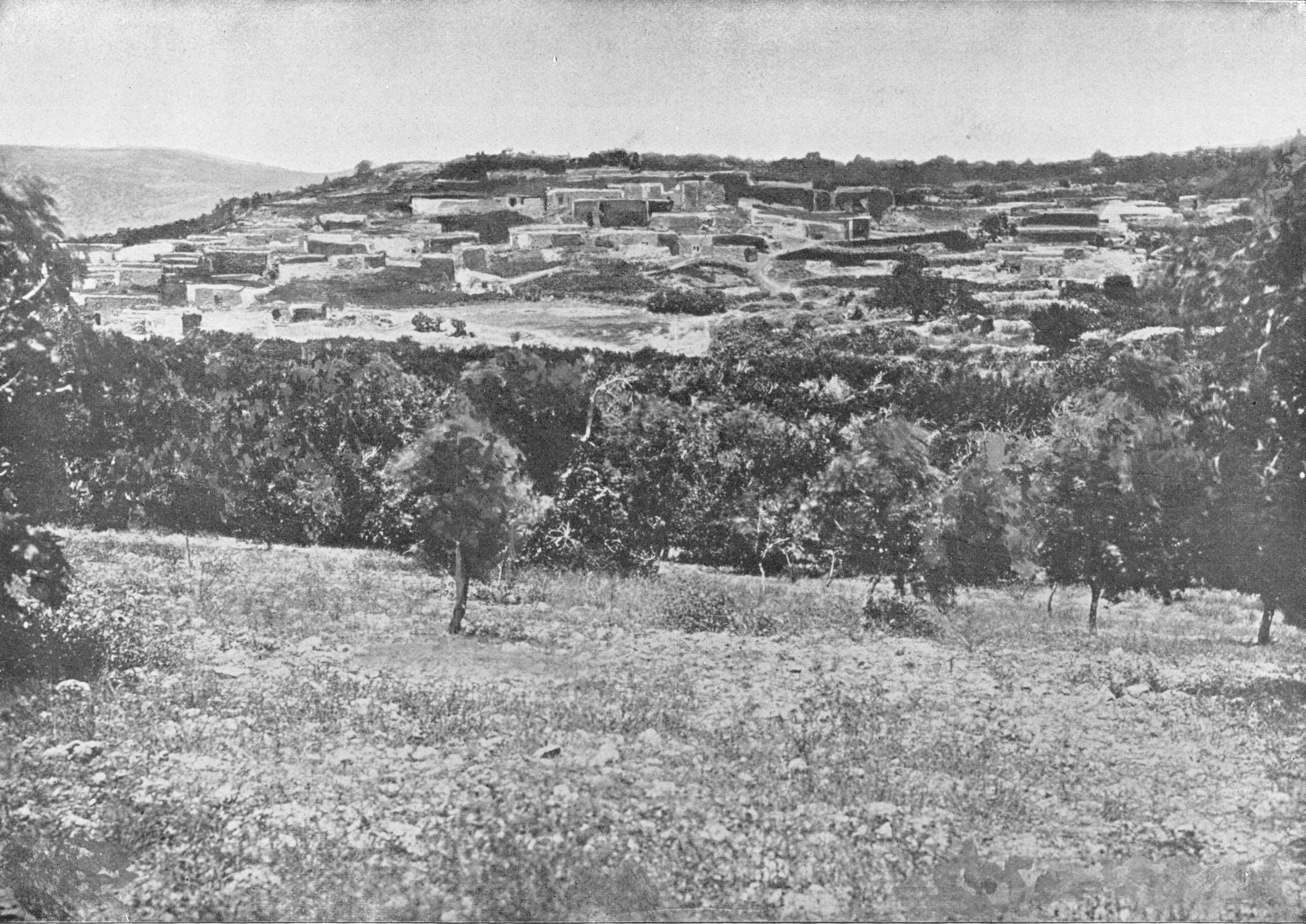
Kafr Kanna described as "Cana of Galilee". Holy Land Photographed by Daniel B. Shepp, 1894.

Cana of Galilee (Ancient Greek: Κανὰ τῆς Γαλιλαίας, romanized: Kana tēs Galilaias) is the location of the Wedding at Cana, at which the miracle of turning water into wine took place in the Gospel of John.

The location is disputed, with the four primary locations being Kafr Kanna, Khirbet Qana and Reineh in Lower Galilee, and Qana in Upper Galilee in Lebanon. The Arabic phrase "Qana el-Jalil" has been said not to be in use as a placename other than in Gospel-related contexts. The name possibly derives from the Hebrew or Aramaic word for reeds.

== Written references to Cana ==
=== Biblical references ===
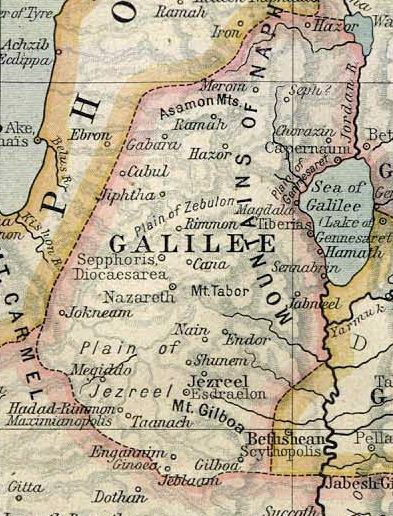
Cana is very positively located in Shepherd's Historical Atlas, 1923: modern scholars are less sure.

Among Christians and other students of the New Testament, Cana is best known as the place where, according to the Fourth Gospel, Jesus performed "the first of his signs", his first public miracle, the turning of a large quantity of water into wine at a wedding feast (John 2, John 2:1–11) when the wine provided by the bridegroom had run out. Although none of the synoptic gospels record the event, mainstream Christian tradition holds that this is the first public miracle of Jesus.

The other biblical references to Cana are also in John: John 4 (John 4:46), which mentions that Jesus is visiting Cana when he is asked to heal the son of a royal official at Capernaum; and John 21 (John 21:2), where it is mentioned that Nathanael (sometimes identified with the Bartholomew included in the synoptic gospels' lists of apostles) comes from Cana.

The Book of Joshua mentions one city (19:28) and one brook (16:8; 17:9) named Kanah (Cana) – neither is likely to be the Cana of Galilee.

=== Other references ===
In secular history, the annals of Assyrian king Tiglath-Pileser III, who conquered the Galilee in a 733 BCE campaign, contain a badly preserved list of cities that had been thought to mention a certain Kana. It relates that six hundred fifty captives were taken there. However, a revised transliteration revealed the one well-preserved syllable to be Ku, not Ka.

Flavius Josephus mentions more than one place named Cana. In the context of the Galilee, there are two mentions in his Life: one is a place on the road from Iulias, and the other is a place where he resided, about a day's walk from Tiberias.

== Locating Cana ==
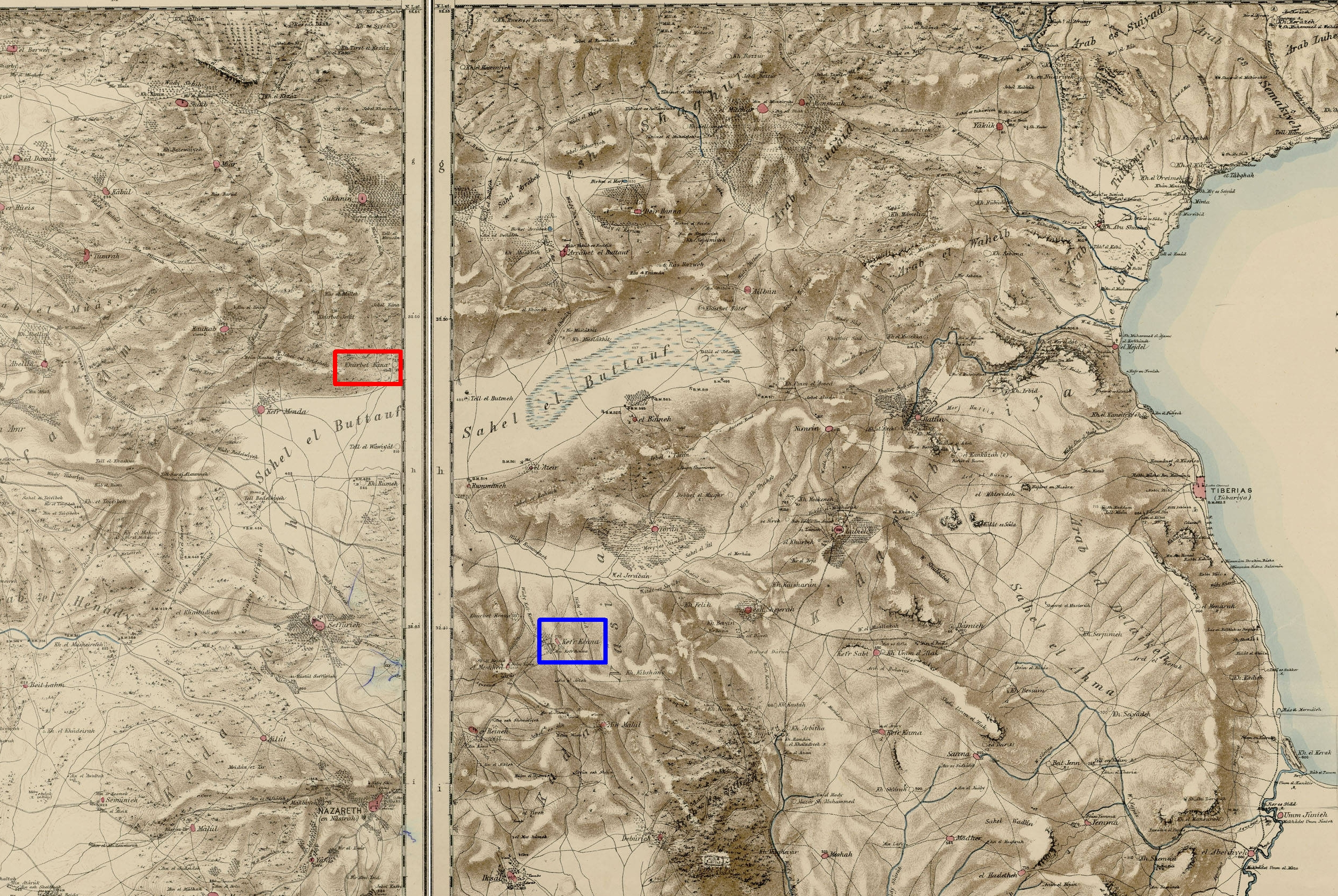
Map of the Lower Galilee with possible locations of Cana: Kafr Kanna, blue; Khirbet Qana, red.

There has been much speculation about where Cana might be. In his Gospel, the author makes no claim to have been at the wedding. Many would regard the story of the wedding at Cana as of theological rather than historical or topographical significance; it is the first of the seven miraculous "signs" by which Jesus's divine status is attested, and around which the gospel is structured.

The consensus of modern scholarship is that the Fourth Gospel was addressed to a group of Jewish Christians, and very possibly a group living in Judea province; so it is unlikely that the evangelist would have mentioned a place that did not exist. There is a minority view that the gospel was written for a gentile audience, and those who take this view assert that the description in the passage about the marriage at Cana of "six stone water jars there for the Jewish rites of purification", in spite of reflecting good knowledge of the ritual washing habits among Jews at the time, is specifically for a gentile audience, who would not know the topography of the Holy Land. On this hypothesis, the name "Cana" might have some purely symbolic significance.

There are four primary locations which have been under consideration as the New Testament Cana:

- Upper Galilee
  - Qana, Lebanon
- Lower Galilee
  - Kafr Kanna, Israel (also spelled Kefar Kenna)
    - Karm er-Ras, the western part of Kafr Kanna
  - Khirbet Qana, Israel
  - Ain Qana, Israel

=== Qana, Lebanon ===
The village of Qana, about 18 miles (29 km) from Tyre, Lebanon, is traditionally held to be the correct site by most Christians, and is Eusebius's pick in his 4th century Onomasticon. It is a popular tourist site commemorating the miracle.

=== Kafr Kanna and Karm er-Ras ===
The first time this site is associated with New Testament Cana is in a mid-17th century report to the Pope by Francesco Quaresmi, the papal emissary to Palestine, where he noted there were two possible candidates: Khirbet Qana and Kafr Kanna. According to the Catholic Encyclopedia, a tradition dating back to the 8th century identifies Cana with the modern Arab town of Kafr Kanna, at the foot of the Nazareth range, about 7 kilometres (4.3 mi) northeast of Nazareth.

Some scholars believe, according to archaeological evidence, that the identification of Kafr Kanna was the result of the decline of Khirbet Qana beginning in the Mamluk period. They note that it was a common practice for new and more affluent and easily accessible sites to be established in place of old ones to accommodate increases in pilgrim traffic, particularly in the late Medieval and Ottoman periods.

Karm er-Ras, the western part of Kafr Kanna, was recently excavated by Israeli archaeologist Yardenna Alexandre. The excavation revealed evidence of a substantial Roman village with a Jewish population which declined considerably in the Late Roman period, and which was finally abandoned in the Byzantine Period, explaining why the pilgrim route was shifted to Kafr Kanna. Alexandre believes the site is precisely identified by Josephus, but other scholars disagree.

=== Khirbet Kana, Israel ===
Another possible candidate is the ruined village of Khirbet Qana, meaning "the ruins of Cana." Overlooking the Beit Netofa Valley from the north, it is located about 9 kilometres (5.6 mi) north of Kafr Kanna and has been noticed by pilgrims since the 12th century or earlier. However, this could either be an ancient retention, as Edward Robinson maintained, or may have been attached to the place in conversation with querying pilgrims.

This site is located on a limestone outcropping that rises 330 feet (100 m) above the floor of the Bet Netofa Valley, 8 miles (13 km) from Nazareth and 5 miles (8.0 km) northeast of Sepphoris in lower Galilee. It also has long been identified as the true location of New Testament Cana. Excavations by archaeologist Douglas Edwards of the University of Puget Sound and archaeologist Tom McCollough reveal architectural and numismatic remains demonstrating that the site contained a modest-sized village from the Hellenistic period onward (c. 200 BCE – 650 CE), including a structure that bears similarities to Roman-period synagogues, and several mikveh pools for Jewish ceremonial bathing. Most importantly, they uncovered a cave complex on the south slope of the site that showed indications of use as a center for worship, including a sarcophagus lid or altar and a shelf that held two stone vessels in situ, and space for another four vessels, suggesting that Khirbet Kana was regarded as New Testament Cana from a very early time. Remains of an Arab village and a church or monastery were also uncovered immediately south of the cave complex.

Other historical evidence from the Byzantine and Medieval periods show that Khirbet Kana was regarded as the true site of New Testament Cana from a very early period. A guidebook written by Theodosius between 517 and 527 CE titled The Layout of the Holy Land identifies Khirbet Kana and indicates that two of the vessels were still at the location. A pilgrim account written by Saewulf in 1101 to 1103 CE also identifies the site, as do Belard of Ascoli (c. 1155 CE) and Dominican friar Burchard of Mount Sion (1283 CE), and a map by noted cartographer Petrus Vesconte in 1321 CE. Burchard of Mount Sion describes a cave complex located there that was used as a veneration site: "the place is shown at this day where the six water pots stood, and the dining-room where the tables were placed."

=== 'Ain Kanah, Reineh, Israel ===
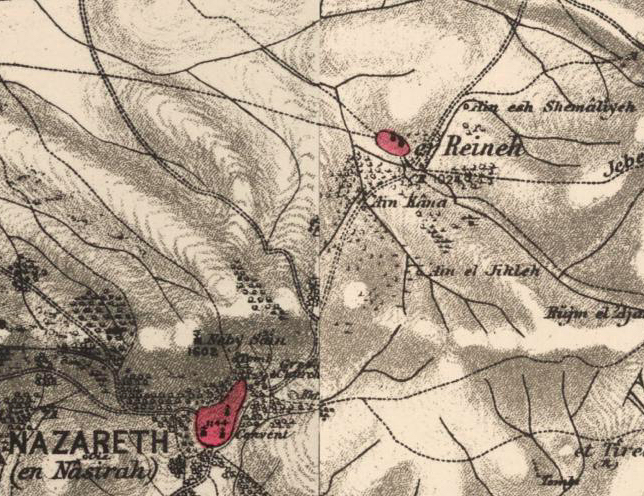
Reineh in the 1870 PEF Survey of Palestine, showing Ain Kana, identified by C. R. Conder as a good candidate for biblical Cana

Just about 1.5 miles northeast from Nazareth is the Arab town of Reineh, and on the way out of it toward Mount Tabor there is a small spring named 'Ain Kânah (not to be confused with Ain Qana in Lebanon), which was identified by Claude Reignier Conder his Tent Work in Palestine (1878) as the better candidate for the location of Cana, based on etymological grounds. Some early Christian pilgrim reports mention a spring in association with the Cana of Galilee, but no excavations had been conducted there yet as of 2015.

== See also ==
- Ain Qana, municipality in South Lebanon northeast of Qana

== Bibliography ==
- Masterman, E. W. G. (1910). "Cana of Galilee". The Biblical World. 36 (2): 79–92. doi:10.1086/474359. JSTOR 3141390. S2CID 144945747.(free access)
- McCollough, Tom (2015). "Searching for Cana Where Jesus Turned Water into Wine". Biblical Archaeology Review. 41 (6): 31–38.
