= Qana =

Town in South Lebanon

Qana قانا Cana
- Municipality
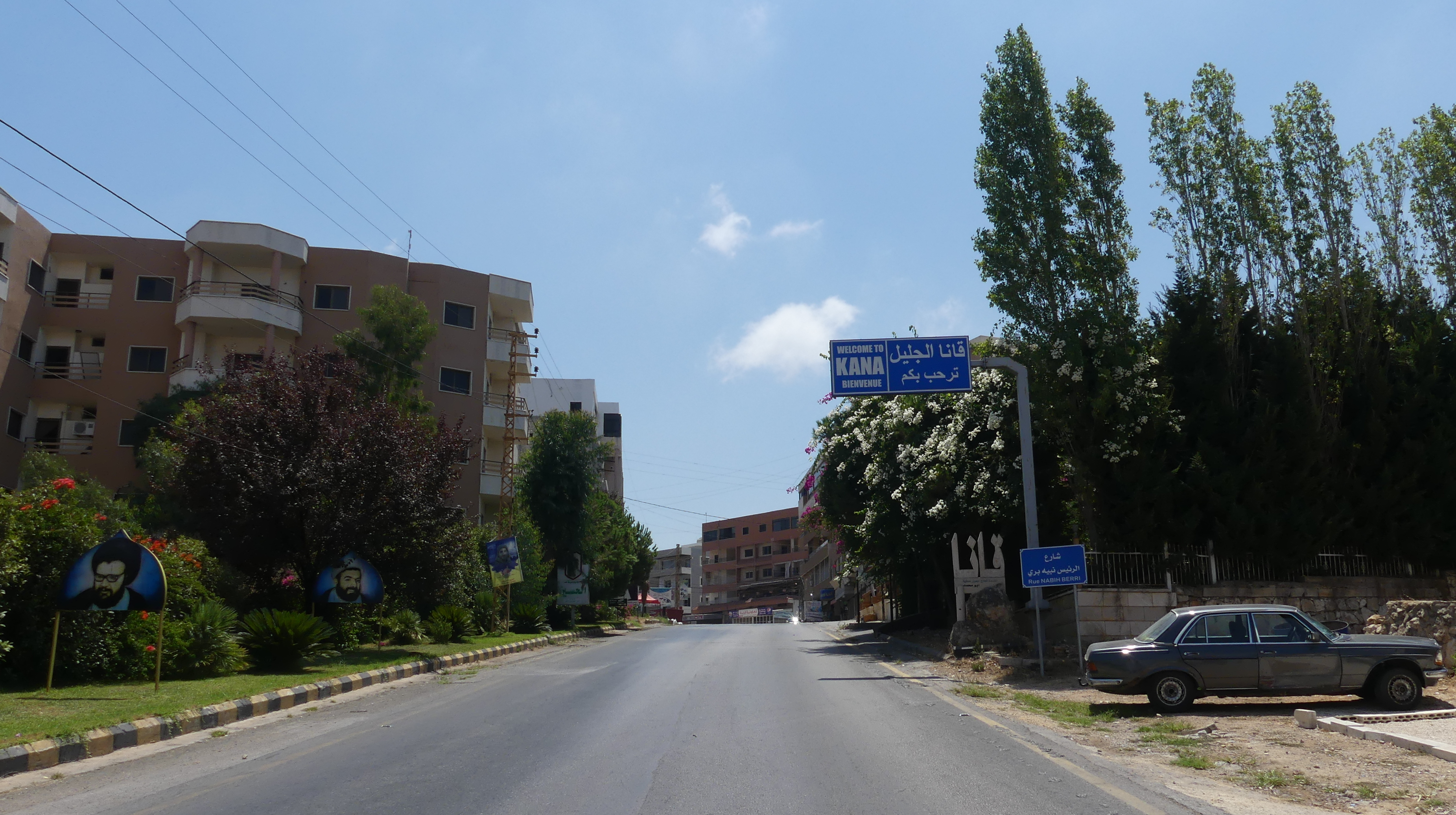
- Entrance to the town in 2019

- Location within Lebanon
- Coordinates: 33°12′33″N 35°17′57″E
- Grid position: 178/290 PAL
- Country: Lebanon
- Governorate: South Governorate
- District: Tyre
- Elevation: 950 ft (290 m)

Population
  - Total: 10,000 (Estimate)

Qana (Arabic: قانا, romanized: Qānā), also spelled Cana, Canna or Kana, is a municipality in southern Lebanon located 10 kilometres (6.2 mi) southeast of the city of Tyre and 12 kilometres (7.5 mi) north of the border with Israel. It is revered by Lebanese Christians and Muslims alike. The municipality is also known for the two massacres of civilian committed by the Israel Defense Forces during military operations in Lebanon.

The 10,000 residents of Qana are primarily Shia although there is also a Melkite (Greek Catholic) Christian community in the village.

== Location ==
Qana is located in the Tyre District within the Governorate (Mohafaza) of South Lebanon. It is 14 km (9 mi) away from the center of the caza and 92 km (57 mi) from the capital of Lebanon, Beirut. Qana stands at an altitude of 300 m (984 ft) and the town's size is approximately 1,100 hectares (2,718 acres). Surrounding villages include Hanaway, Deir Kanoun, Rmadiyyeh, Deir Amess and Siddikine.

== Religious significance ==
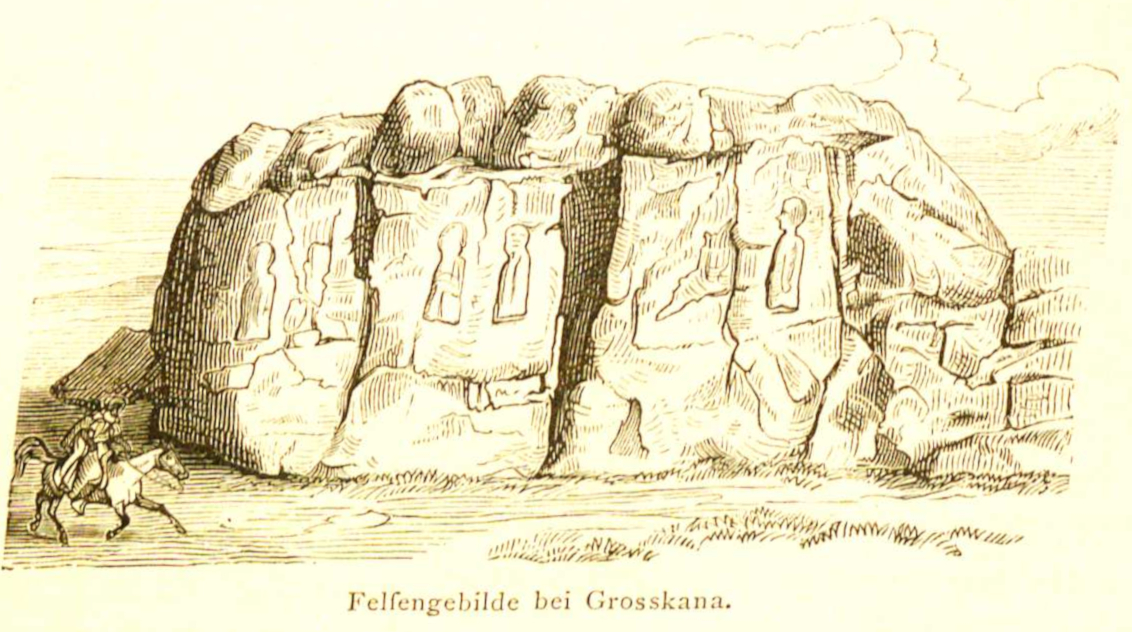
1879 illustration by German explorer Johann Nepomuk Sepp showing a cliff formation from "Grosskana", German for "Large(r) Kana"

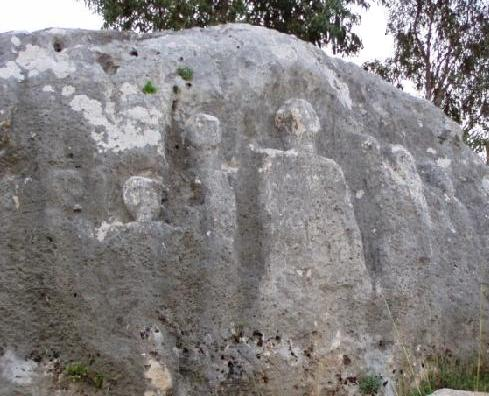
Bas-Relief of the Apostles in Qana, a Christian pilgrimage site in Lebanon

In the Gospel of John, Jesus is said to have performed his first miracle of turning water into wine at Cana in Galilee. Lebanese Christians, and some Shia Muslims believe Qana to have been the actual location of this event. Eusebius of the 4th century shared this view in his Onomasticon.

In 1994, Nabih Berri, Lebanon's Parliament Speaker and leader of the secular Shia Amal Movement, wanted to establish a Christian shrine at a cave in Qana to attract tourists and pilgrims. The government sent a 100-man company of troops to Qana to prevent potential religious conflict. This proposal was revived in 1999.

== History ==
There are many ancient ruins around the village.

In 1596, it was named as a village, Qana, in the Ottoman nahiya (subdistrict) of Tibnin under the liwa' (district) of Safad, with a population of 47 households and five bachelors, all Muslim. The villagers paid a taxes on agricultural products, such as goats and beehives, in addition to "occasional revenues", a press for olive oil or grape syrup, and a fixed sum; a total of 3,916 akçe.

In 1875, Victor Guérin visited: "This great village, the population of which is at least a thousand, is divided into three quartiers. The highest, called Kana el Foka, occupies the summit of the hill. It is considered the most ancient of the three. It is now entirely abandoned, except by about thirty Metawileh, and the stones of its overthrown houses are continually being removed to build new houses in the two other quarters. In the second quarter are about 600 Metawileh in the third, 400 United Greeks.'

In 1881, the PEF's Survey of Western Palestine (SWP) described it: "A large village of well-built houses, whose inhabitants are partly Christians, partly Moslems. There are about 400 Christians to 500 Moslems. The ground is cultivated, and planted with olives and figs. The village is divided into two parts, with a birket between. There is a Christian church. It is situated on high ground, and is well supplied with water from the two springs, 'Ain el Gharbiyeh and 'Ain el Kussis.

=== Modern era ===
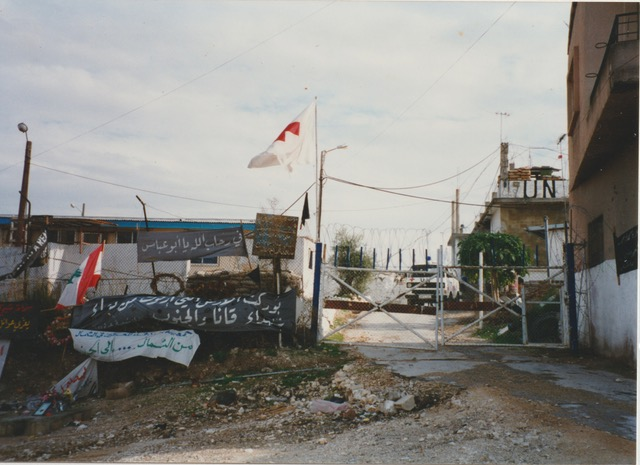
Entrance to the UN base in Qana, 1992

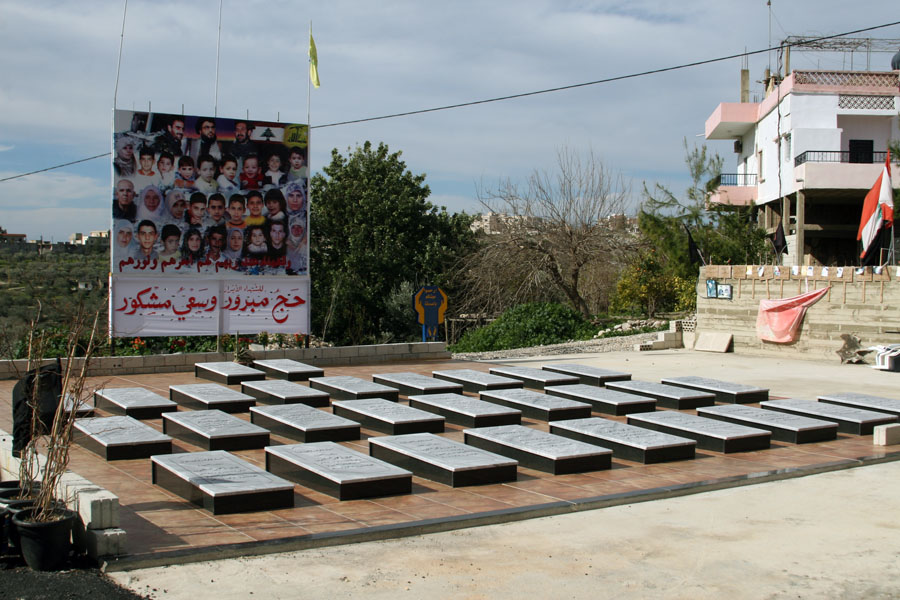
Graves of the 28 people killed by the airstrikes on Qana on 18 April 1996

Qana is known for several separate massacres in which the Israel Defense Forces caused civilian deaths during military operations in Lebanon.

- 1996 Qana massacre: On 18 April 1996, amid heavy fighting between the Israeli army and Hezbollah fighters during Operation Grapes of Wrath, a Fijian UNIFIL peacekeeping compound in the village was shelled by Israeli artillery, killing 106 civilians and injuring around 116 others who had taken refuge there to escape the fighting. Four UNIFIL soldiers were also seriously injured. The Israeli army claimed it was a mistake, stating that Hezbollah elements were located near the camp. The UN report, however, suggested that the airstrike was deliberate.
- 2006 Qana airstrike: On 30 July 2006, during the 2006 Israel-Lebanon conflict, an Israeli military aircraft bombed the village of Qana. The tragedy caused the collapse of a residential building. The Red Cross originally stated that at least 56 people were killed, 32 of whom were children. Human Rights Watch later announced that at least 22 people escaped the basement, and 28 were confirmed dead, of whom 16 were children, with 13 more than still missing.
- On 15 October 2024, least 15 people were killed by an Israeli airstrike in the city of Qana during the conflict between Israel and Hezbollah, related to the Gaza war.
- On 12 April 2026 an Israeli strike in the city of Qana killed five people, including three women, and wounded 25 others as Israeli premier Benjamin Netanyahu insisted to troops occupying south Lebanon.

== Population ==
=== Religious groups ===
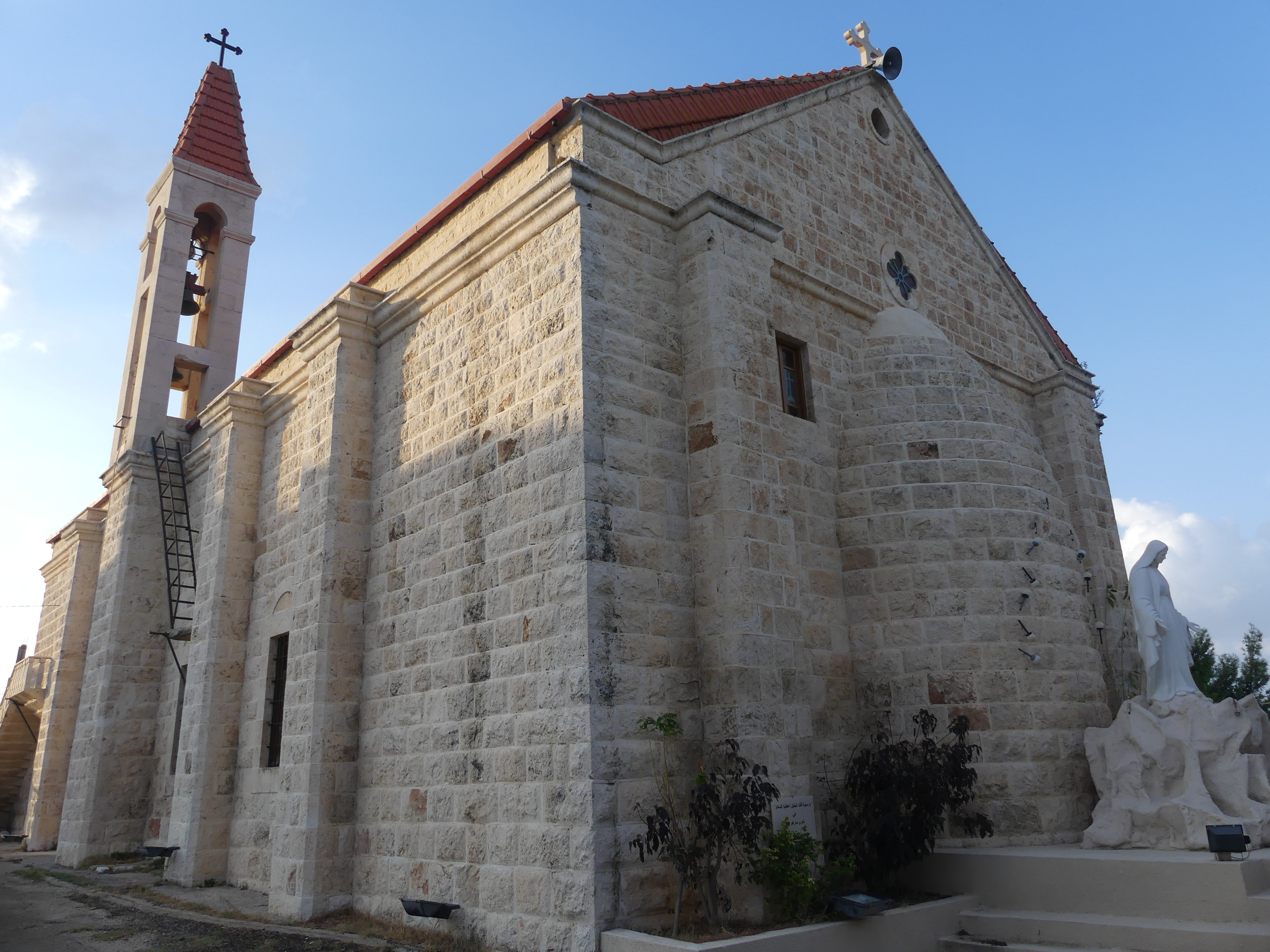
The Melkite church of Saint Joseph in Qana, built in 1906. The parish belongs to the Melkite Archeparchy of Tyre. On the right hand side is a statue of the Virgin "Our Lady of Cana of Galilee" in memory of Margot Tyan, mother-in-law of Amine Gemayel, former President of Lebanon.

In 2014 Muslims made up 87.40% and Christians made up 12.10% of registered voters in Qana. 86.44% of the voters were Shiite Muslims and 10.45% were Greek Catholics.

In Qana there are two mosques, as well as the Catholic Saint Joseph Church.

=== Emigration ===
Qana can be characterized by the high emigration rates it has seen, dating back to the 1920s. Increasing progressively, the current number of those who have emigrated has reached 2,500 people, which is equivalent to 32% of the registered population.

Main destinations for Qana residents include the Côte d'Ivoire (46%), Senegal (15%), Saudi Arabia (6%), the United States (6%), Zaïre (5%) as well as other countries (Sierra Leone, Kuwait, Liberia, Nigeria, France and the UK).

=== Local families ===
According, to the Paris-based Centre de ressources sur le développement local au Liban, one can count approximately 100 families in Qana, with the largest, based on the number of voters, being the following: Attieh (580 voters), Borji (200 voters), Chalhoub (196 voters), Abdel Rida (186 voters), Sa’egh (184 voters), Jaber (158 voters), Zaarour (134 voters), Hammoud (130 voters), Dakhlallah (124 voters), Haidar (116 voters), Adib (104 voters), Salami (103 voters), Farnoune (78 voters), Madi (71 voters), Hodroj (69 voters), Haddad (152 voters), Boutros (77 voters), Shami (72 voters), Hajj (66 voters), and Abdelhussein (21 voters).

== Local authorities ==
The local administration in Qana is headed by a Municipal Council composed of 15 members and headed by Dr. Salah Salami. In addition, the town has four mayors: Afif Haddad, Ali Ismail, Ali Attieh and Kemel Farnoune.

== Educational sector ==
There are two public schools in Qana (Qana Public High School with around 600 students and the Public Intermediate School of Qana that has approximately 550 students), and two private schools (Jabal Amel Typical school which is subsidized and numbers 370 students and Jabal Amel High School with 142 students).

== Service and trade institutions ==
The number of service and trade institutions in the town are estimated to be in the region of 263, dealing mainly in the fabric trade and clothing (26), food products (51), household items (14), and bakeries and butcheries (12).

== Agricultural sector ==
The municipality of Qana owns approximately 23% of the town's total area. Agricultural land constitutes 37% of the terrain and land ownership is distributed among approximately 220 families i.e. the town's real estate is owned by 22% of the families in the town.

Olive cultivation consumes around 65% of agricultural land, with 15% for grains and 20% for tobacco. In addition, 62 people are employed in the agriculture sector, which is approximately 7% of the labor force.

== Clubs and associations ==
There are seven associations in the village of Qana distributed as follows: Qana sports club, Qana's agricultural cooperative, Association of Qana El Jalil, El Jalil club (non-active), as well as the family associations of the Attieh, Hammoud and Zaarour families.

== Historical sites ==
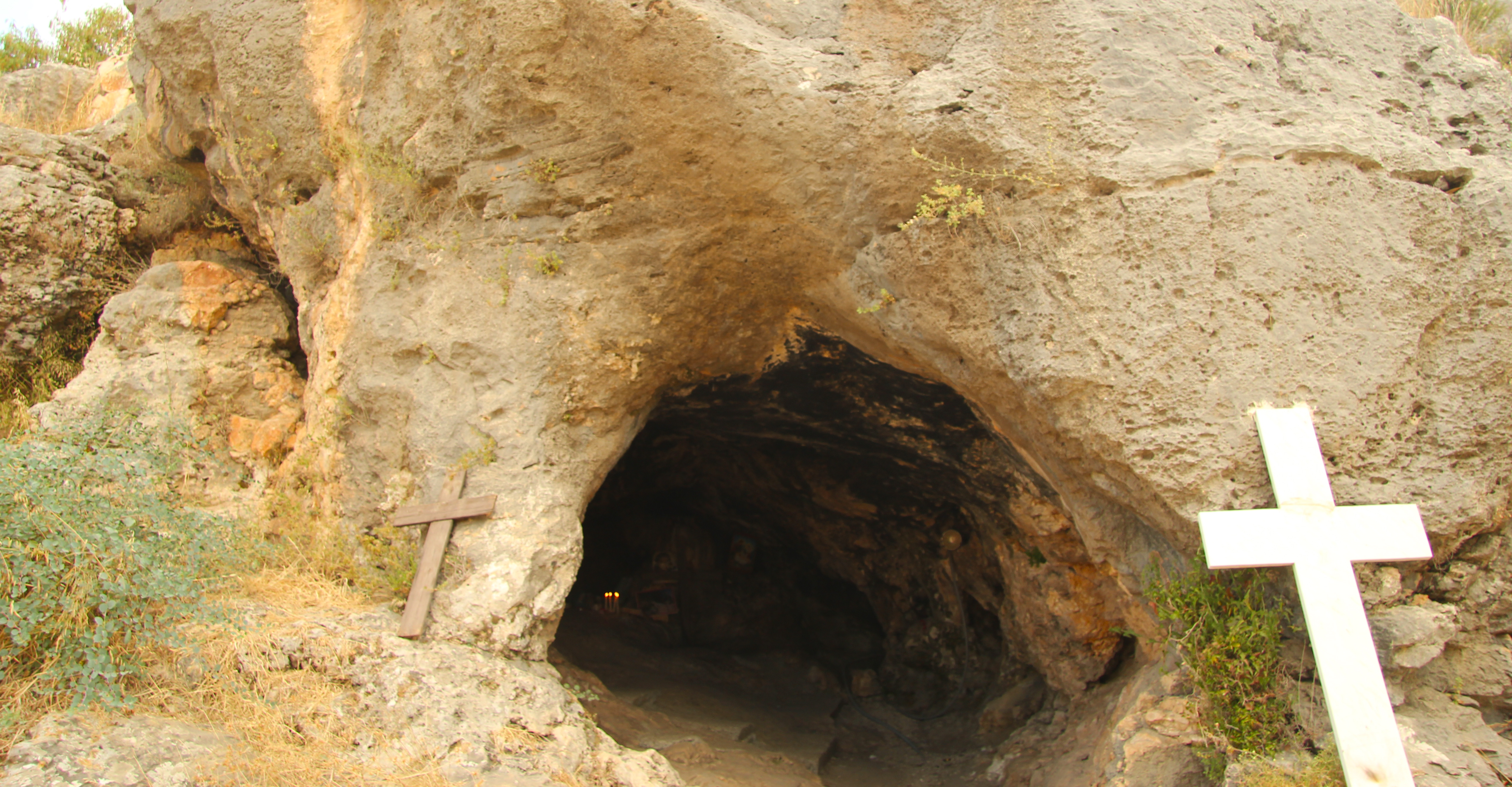
Qana Cave where Jesus is said to have spent 3 days in reflection before the first miracle was made and where Jesus followers later on sought refuge from persecution

There are natural, rock-dug caves to be found in Qana that carry old inscriptions. It is said that Jesus Christ’s first miracle took place at a wedding ceremony (the Wedding at Cana) in one of these caves.

An ancient tomb, falsely attributed to King Hiram of Tyre, can be found outside Qana on the road to the neighbouring village of Hanaway/Hannaouiyeh.

== In popular culture ==
- Lebanese poet and historian Mayy Murr composed a poem titled "Cana du Liban," referencing Qana, Lebanon as the location of Jesus' miracle at the wedding feast.

== See also ==
- Ain Qana, municipality in Southern Lebanon northeast of Qana

== Bibliography ==
- Conder, C.R.; Kitchener, H.H. (1881). The Survey of Western Palestine: Memoirs of the Topography, Orography, Hydrography, and Archaeology. Vol. 1. London: Committee of the Palestine Exploration Fund.
- Guérin, V. (1880). Description Géographique Historique et Archéologique de la Palestine (in French). Vol. 3: Galilee, pt. 2. Paris: L'Imprimerie Nationale.
- Hütteroth, W.-D.; Abdulfattah, K. (1977). Historical Geography of Palestine, Transjordan and Southern Syria in the Late 16th Century. Erlanger Geographische Arbeiten, Sonderband 5. Erlangen, Germany: Vorstand der Fränkischen Geographischen Gesellschaft. ISBN 3-920405-41-2.
- Palmer, E.H. (1881). The Survey of Western Palestine: Arabic and English Name Lists Collected During the Survey by Lieutenants Conder and Kitchener, R. E. Transliterated and Explained by E.H. Palmer. Committee of the Palestine Exploration Fund.
- Rhode, H. (1979). Administration and Population of the Sancak of Safed in the Sixteenth Century. Columbia University. Archived from the original on 10 October 2016.
