= Ain Qana =

Ain Qana عين قانا Ainqana
- Municipality
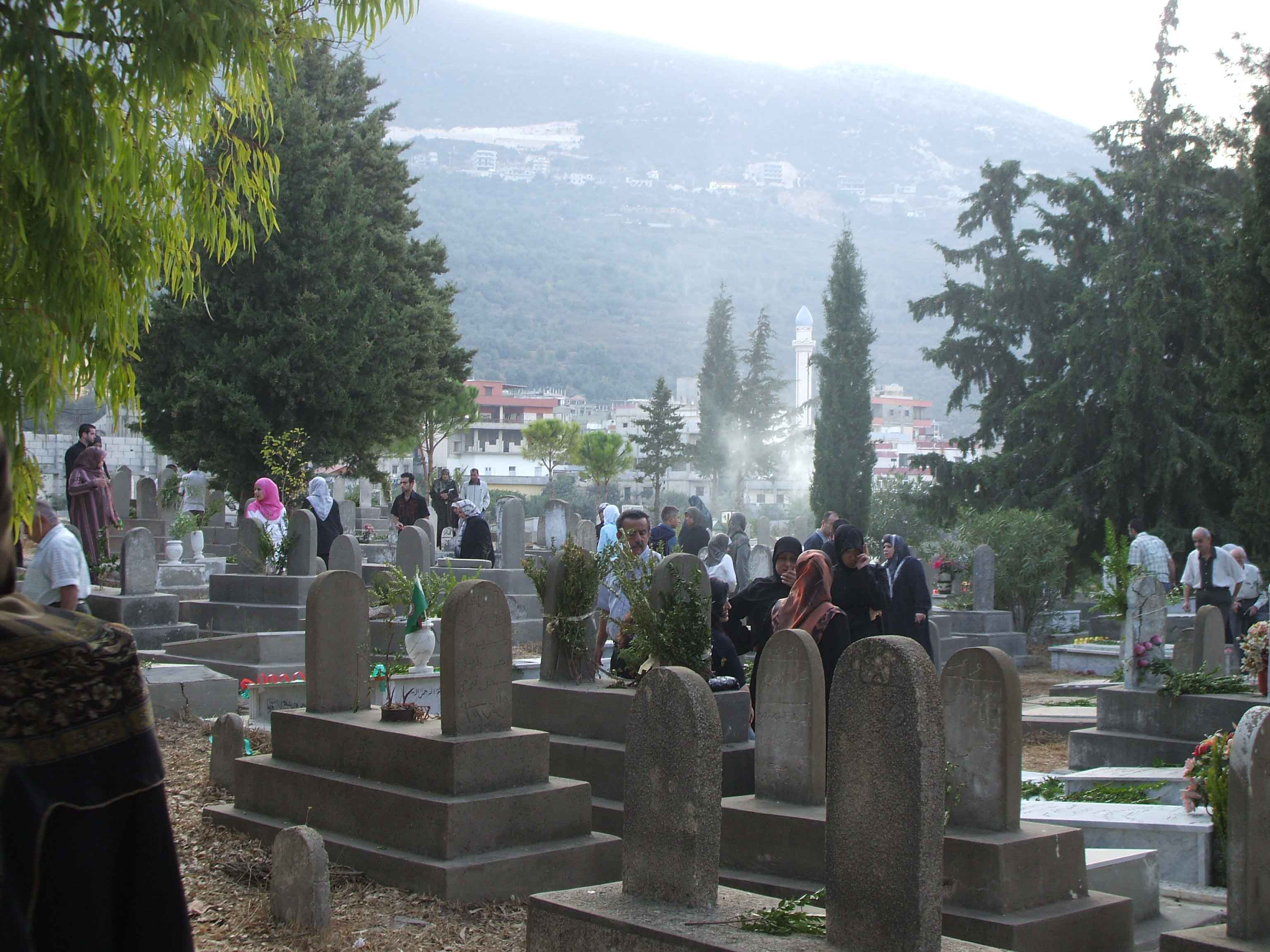
- Cemetery, Ain Qana 2007

- Location in Lebanon
- Coordinates: 33°28′19″N 35°30′37″E
- Country: Lebanon
- Governorate: Nabatieh Governorate
- District: Nabatieh District
- Time zone: UTC+2 (EET)
  - Summer (DST): +3

Ain Qana (Arabic: عين قانا, romanized: ʿAyn Qānā), also known as Ainqana, is a municipality in the Nabatieh Governorate, Southern Lebanon.

The town is situated 680 meters above sea level, has an area of 630 hectares and a population of approximately 5585.

== Demographics ==
In 2014 Muslims made up 99.36% of registered voters in Ain Qana. 97.36% of the voters were Shiite Muslims.

== See also ==
- Qana, town in Southern Lebanon southwest of Ain Qana
