= Kafr Kanna =

Town in Northern District, Israel

Kafr Kanna: כַּפְר כָּנָּא; كفر كنا
- Local council (from 1968)

Hebrew transcription(s)
  - ISO 259: Kpar Kannaˀ
  - Also spelled: Kafar Kanna (official); Kufr Kana (unofficial)
- Location within Jezreel Valley region of Israel Location within Israel
- Coordinates: 32°45′N 35°21′E
- Grid position: 182/239 PAL
- Country: Israel
- District: Northern
- Subdistrict: Jezreel
- Natural Region: Nazareth-Tir'an Mountains

Government
  - Head of Municipality: Izz al-Din Amara

Area
  - Total: 10.6 km^{2} (4.1 sq mi)

Population (2024)
  - Total: 25,374
  - Density: 2,390/km^{2} (6,200/sq mi)
- Name meaning: "Village of Cana"

Kafr Kanna (Arabic: كفر كنا, Kafr Kanā; Hebrew: כַּפְר כַּנָּא) is an Arab town in the Galilee, part of the Northern District of Israel. It is associated by Christians with the New Testament village of Cana, where Jesus turned water into wine. In 2024 its population was 25,374. It has a religiously mixed population of Muslims and Christians from different denominations.

A Jewish village during antiquity, Kafr Kanna is mentioned in an extant 9th-century Islamic marble stele. Under Crusader rule, from the 12th to mid-13th centuries, it was a casale (country estate). Kafr Kanna had become a large village by 1300, during Mamluk rule. It flourished as one of the largest localities in Palestine and one of the two market towns of the Safed Sanjak under Ottoman rule in the 16th century, when its population was mostly Muslim with a significant Jewish minority. By the 19th century, its population was roughly equal parts Muslim and Christian, a state which persisted through British Mandatory rule (1917–1948). Since 1948, it is a part of Israel.

== History ==
Archaeological excavations by the Israel Antiquities Authority uncovered remains dating from the Neolithic to the Mamluk periods.

=== Metal ages ===
Evidence for a large Early Bronze Age settlement was excavated adjacent to the perennial Kanna spring, overlaying a site dating to the Early Chalcolithic period. A fortification wall indicates that the settlement was fortified.

Kana was mentioned in the Amarna letters.

In 2001, remains of a 4th-century BCE (Iron Age) pottery kiln that produced everted rim storage jars were found adjacent to the Kanna spring.

=== Roman and Byzantine empires ===
During the first century CE, Kafr Kanna was a Jewish village. It was mentioned by the Roman-Jewish historian Josephus in his The Life of Flavius Josephus.

On the outskirts of the modern town is the tomb of the Jewish sage, rabbi Simeon ben Gamliel, who became the Nasi (president) of the Sanhedrin in 50 CE. His tomb has remained a Jewish pilgrimage site over the centuries.

Excavation beneath Kafr Kanna's Franciscan church uncovered mosaic floor panels with Aramaic donor inscriptions, using the square Jewish script. An inscription on one of the panels commemorates "Yose son of Tanhum son of Botah," stating that he, along with his sons, made a donation for the creation of the inscribed panel. The other inscription may possibly mention the name Yeshu'a. Excavations under the same church also unearthed a round "discus" lamp dating from the second century AD, which includes a signature of the potter, named Iason.

In 2023, a burial cave with decorated stone ossuaries that were used by Jews for secondary burial in the years following the Bar Kohkba revolt was discovered in Kafr Kanna.

During excavations at Kerem er-Ras/Karm er-Ras, located on the western periphery of the village of Kafr Kanna, a fragment of a Latin burial inscription was discovered in 2001. This inscription, dating back to the 5th century AD, mentions Legio X Fretensis. It is today on display in the Hecht Museum on Haifa. Also unearthed in Kafr Kanna is a magic amulet from the 5th to 7th century, including a metal inscribed charm with 41 lines of Aramaic using the Jewish script. This amulet was designed to counter various fevers, referencing sacred names like Abraxas and the letter tsade (צ), symbolizing the name Sabaoth, as well as a Hebrew idiom.

=== Middle Ages ===
In the early 9th century, under Abbasid rule, Abu Salih Khayr al-Khadim, an eunuch of Caliph al-Mu’tazz b’illah, left all his property in Kafr Kanna and another Galilee village, Kfar Tavor (then called Kafr Tabaria), to a waqf (religious endowment). The endowments were supposed to be eternal, but were presumably ended by the conquest of the Crusaders in 1099.

The Persian traveler Nasir-i-Khusraw visited the village in 1047 CE and described the place in his diary:

To the southward [of Kafar Kannah] is a hill, on the top of which they have built a fine monastery. It has a strong gate, and the tomb of the prophet Yunis (Jonas) [...] is shown within. Near the gate of the monastery is a well, and the water thereof is sweet and good. [...] Acre is 4 leagues distant.

During the Crusader period, the Persian traveler Ali of Herat wrote that one could see the Maqam of Jonas, and also the grave of his son, at Kafr Kanna. This was repeated by the Syrian geographer Yaqut al-Hamawi, although he only wrote of the tomb as being that of Jonas's father. The name Casale Robert was used by the Crusaders, beside variations of the Arab name. In August 1254 Julian, the lord of Sidon, sold it to the Knights Hospitaller.

Around 1300, during Mamluk rule, Kafr Kanna was described as being a large village, in which lived the chiefs of various tribes. The head tribe is called Kais al-Hamra ("Kais the Red.") According to the chronicler al-Dimashqi, the district al-Batuf, called "the Drowned Meadow", belonged to the village. Al-Dimashqi further remarked that the waters of the surrounding hills drained into the area, flooding it; as soon as the land was dried up grain was sown.

=== Ottoman Empire ===
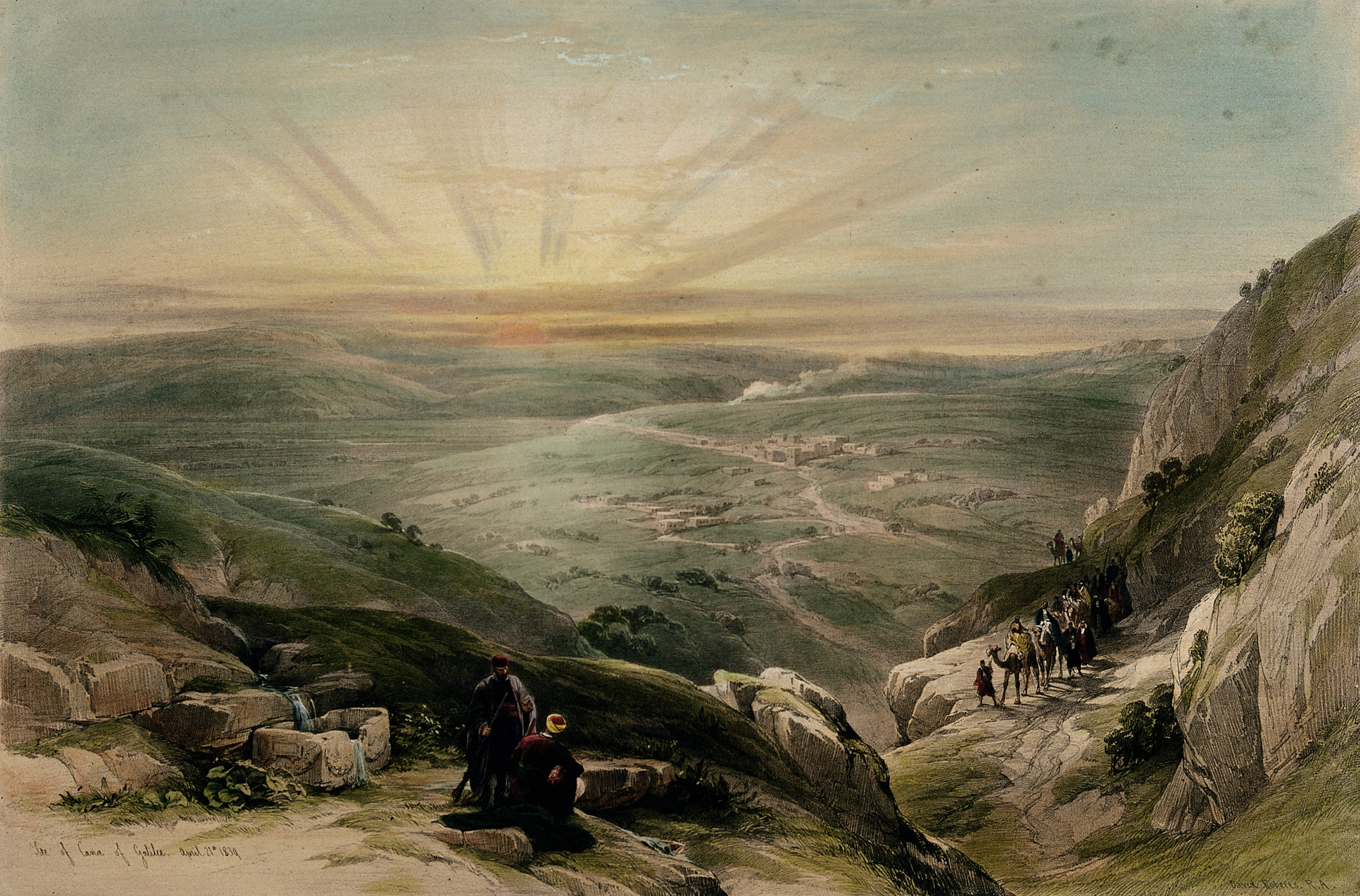
"Sun setting over landscape with Cana in the distance" (1839) in David Roberts' The Holy Land, Syria, Idumea, Arabia, Egypt, and Nubia

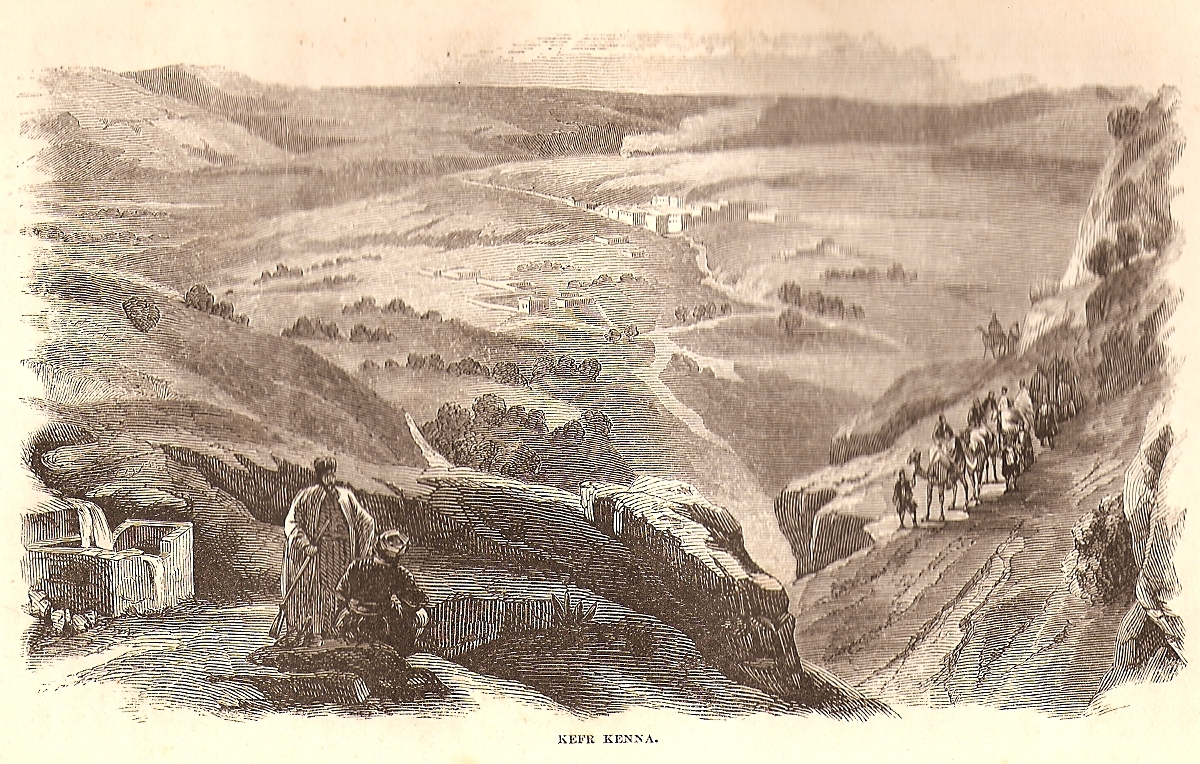
"Kefr Kenna" (1859) in William McClure Thomson's The Land and the Book

Two versions of the same picture, twenty years apart, with the first labelling it "Cana" without reservation, and the latter as "Kefr Kenna". Thomson wrote that he considered Edward Robinson's 1841 Biblical Researches in Palestine "has about settled the question" of Cana's location in favor of Kana el Jalil.

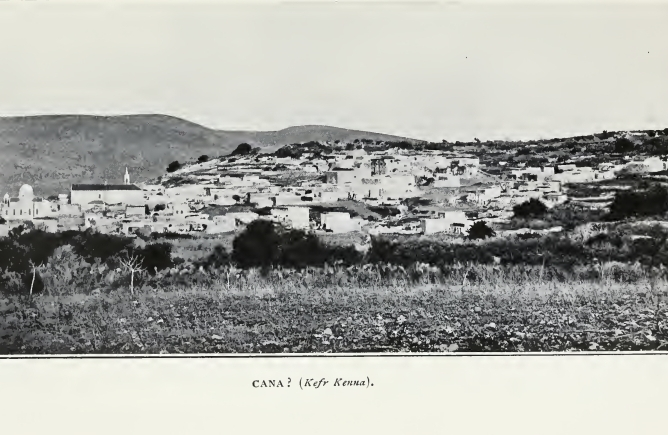
Kfar Kanna, 1903

Under the rule of the Ottoman Empire, the village flourished in the 16th century, as it lay on the western trade route between Egypt and Syria. High taxes of different kinds were levied on the busy market. Among other things it traded in cloths, produced in Galilee for international consumption. Public baths and ovens were also taxed. In 1533, Ottoman officials recorded the population as 147 households, and by 1596 (or rather 1548) it grew to 475 Muslim taxpayers (426 households and 49 bachelors) and 96 Jewish taxpayers (95 households and 1 bachelor), making it the sixth most populous locality in Palestine at the time. The villagers paid a fixed tax-rate of 25% on agricultural products, including wheat, barley, olive trees, fruit trees, cotton, goats and beehives, in addition to occasional revenues and a market toll; a total of 56,303 akçe. At the time, Kafr Kanna was one of the few market villages in the Safed Sanjak (district of Safed) and the second largest after the city of Safed. It was also the only locality in the sanjak besides Safed to have a public bathhouse.

In the mid-18th century, Kafr Kanna was under the control of Uthman al-Daher, a son of Daher al-Umar, the tax farmer and strongman of northern Palestine. Uthman constructed a fort in the village.

A map from Napoleon's invasion of 1799 by Pierre Jacotin showed the place, named as Cana, and David Roberts' The Holy Land, Syria, Idumea, Arabia, Egypt, and Nubia illustrated the same in two separate lithographs. Edward Robinson's 1841 Biblical Researches in Palestine wrote that "The monks of the present day, and all recent travellers, find the Cana of the New Testament, where Jesus converted the water into wine, at Kefr Kenna", however he argued that Cana's location was in fact at the ruins known as Kana el Jalil (Cana of Galilee). In the 1881 PEF's Survey of Western Palestine (SWP), described it as a stone-built village, containing 200 Christians and 200 Muslims. A population list from about 1887 showed that Kefr Kenna had about 830 inhabitants; "the greater part Christians."

=== British Mandate ===
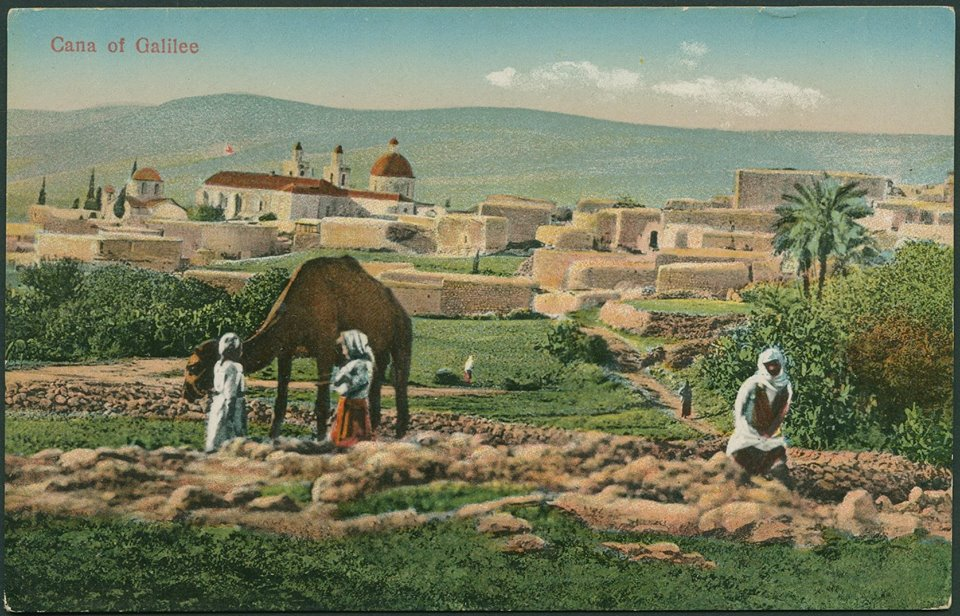
Postcard of Kafr Kanna by Karimeh Abbud, c. 1925

In the 1922 census of Palestine conducted by the British Mandate authorities, Kufr Kenna had a total population of 1,175; 672 Muslims and 503 Christians, of the Christians, 264 were Greek Orthodox, 82 Roman Catholics, 137 Melkites (Greek Catholics) and 20 Anglicans. The population had increased at the 1931 census to 1,378; 896 Muslims and 482 Christians, in a total of 266 houses.

In the 1945 statistics, the population was 1,930; 1,320 Muslims and 610 Christians, while the total land area was 19,455 dunams, according to an official land and population survey. Of this, 1,552 were allocated for plantations and irrigable land, 11,642 for cereals, while 56 dunams were classified as built-up areas.

=== Israel ===
During the 1948 Arab–Israeli War, Kafr Kanna was captured by units of Israel's 7th Brigade in the second half of Operation Dekel (July 15–18, 1948). On July 22, 1948, the two priests, Giuseppe Leombruni (Catholic) and Prochoros (Greek Orthodox), and the Christian mayor surrendered Kafr Kanna peacefully to the advancing Haganah troops, ensuring that the population could remain in the village. Kafr Kanna remained under martial law until 1966.

On 30 March 1976, a resident of Kafr Kanna, Muhammad Yusuf Taha, was one of six people killed by the Israeli army during Land Day demonstrations.

In November 2014, there were clashes for some days because Israeli police killed one Israeli Arab, who attacked a police van with a knife. The police said that they had fired warning shots before shooting him but relatives said he was shot in "cold blood" and images from closed-circuit television (CCTV) showed a police officer shooting at the man while he was backing away.

The mayor of the town is Mujahed Awadeh.

== Religious significance ==
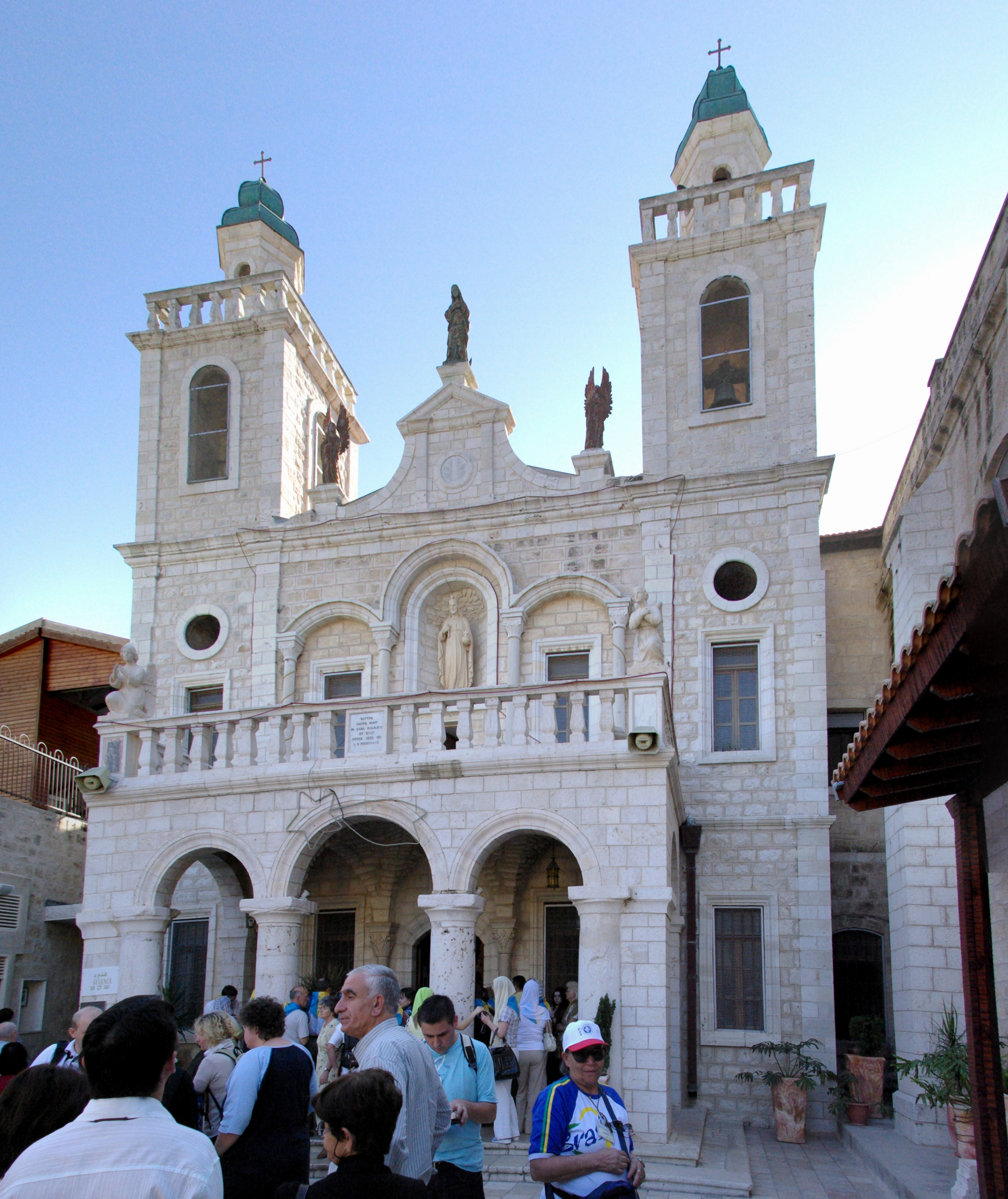
Catholic Wedding Church in Kafr Kanna

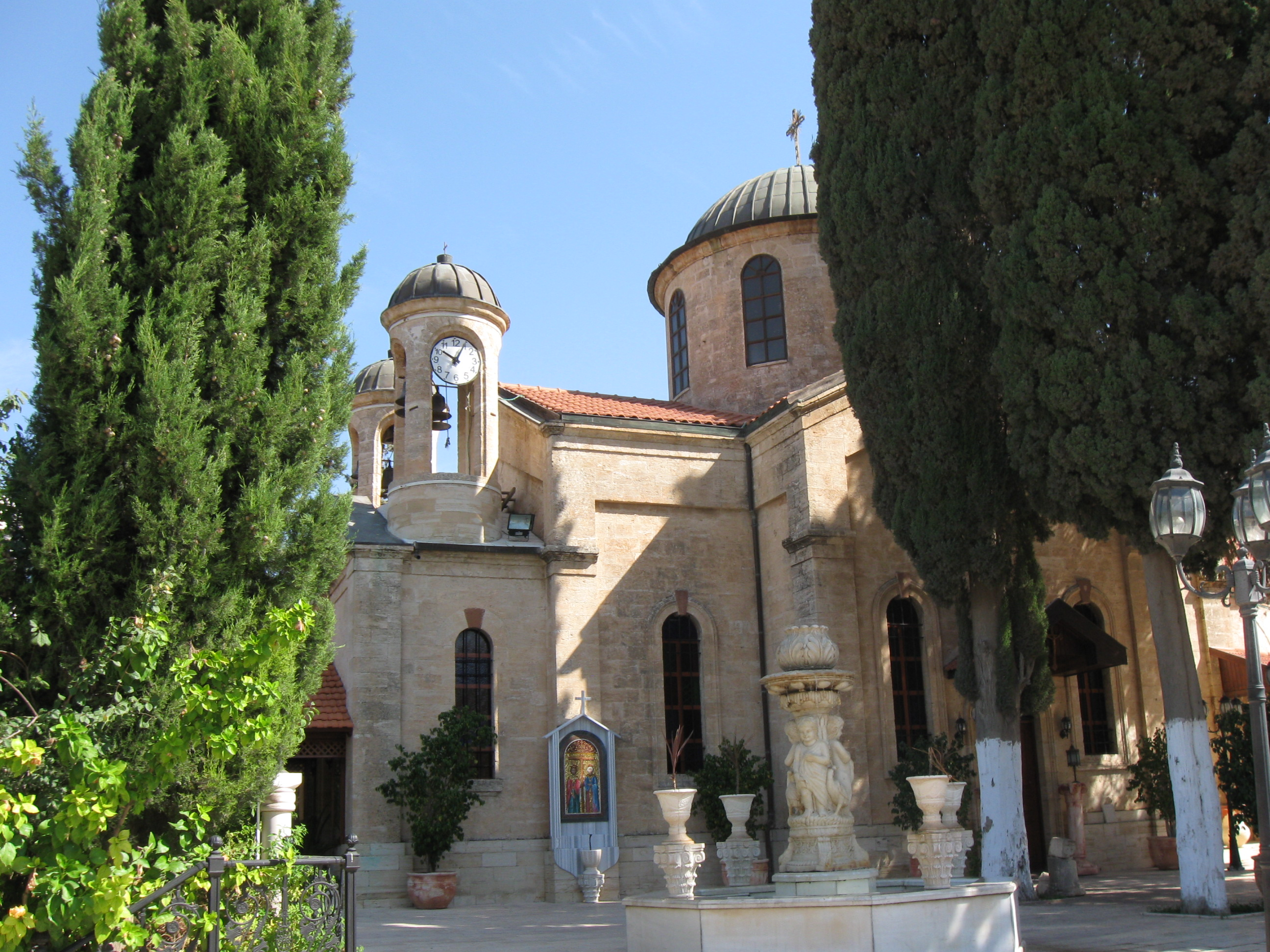
Orthodox Church of St George in Kafr Kanna

The town is identified by Christians as the town of Cana, where Jesus performed a miracle at the Marriage at Cana (John 2:1–12). According to the Catholic Encyclopedia of 1914, the identification of Kafr Kanna with Cana dates back to at least the 8th century. However, the general view starting from the 12th-century placed Cana at Khirbet Kana, a site 8.5 kilometres (5.3 mi) to the northwest of Kafr Kanna. Later, the traditional identification with Kafr Kanna reemerged strongly in the mid-14th-century and until the present day.

Cana is also mentioned as the home town of the Apostle Bartholomew, as "Nathanael of Cana" in John 21:2.

The main churches in Kafr Kanna are the Franciscan Wedding Church, the Greek Orthodox Church of St George and the Baptist Church. Near the two is the (usually closed) Roman Catholic Chapel of the Apostle Bartholomew (Nathanael).

== Demographics ==
Historical population
Year	Pop.	±%
1972	5,300	—
1983	8,500	+60.4%
1995	12,800	+50.6%
2008	18,300	+43.0%
2022	24,262	+32.6%
2024	25,375	+4.6%

Kafr Kanna achieved local council status in 1968. In 2006, there were 18,000 residents, The population grew to 20,832 in the 2014 census. As of 2014, Christians formed about 11% of the population.

As is the case with many other mixed Muslim-Christian towns in the region, the Christians generally tend to live in the oldest part of town. In Kafr Kanna—and in Kafr Yasif and 'Abud, among others—there are two ancient nuclei in the town: the earlier one where Christians live, and another (also hundreds of years old) where Muslims live.

== Sport ==
Hapoel Kafr Kanna and F.C. Tzeirei Kafr Kanna plays in Liga Alef (the third tier). Beitar Kafr Kanna both play in Liga Bet (the fourth tier). Maccabi Kafr Kanna, which dissolved in 2014, have played at the second level in the past.

== Voting Patterns ==
In the 2022 election, 93 percent of voters in Kafr Kanna voted for the Arab parties, while 4 percent voted for the parties of the center-left coalition led by Yair Lapid and 3 percent voted for the parties of the right-wing coalition led by Benjamin Netanyahu. Among the voters for the Arab parties, 40 percent voted for Balad, while 36 percent voted for Ra'am and 24 percent voted for the Hadash–Ta'al list.

In the 2026 election, 97 percent of voters in Kafr Kanna voted for the Arab parties, while 2 percent voted for the parties of the center-left coalition led by Gadi Eisenkot and 0.5 percent voted for the parties of the right-wing coalition led by Benjamin Netanyahu. Among the voters for the Arab parties, 75 percent voted for the Joint List, while 25 percent voted for Ra'am. Voter turnout increased 70 percent from the 2022 election.

== Notable people ==
- Abdulmalik Dehamshe, resident, former Knesset member, United Arab List
- Wasil Taha, resident, Knesset member, Balad party

== See also ==
- Arab localities in Israel

== Bibliography ==
- Alexandre, Yardenna (30 December 2008). "Kafr Kanna" (121). Hadashot Arkheologiyot – Excavations and Surveys in Israel.
- Alexandre, Yardenna (7 April 2011). "Kafr Kanna" (123). Hadashot Arkheologiyot – Excavations and Surveys in Israel.
- Alexandre, Yardenna (19 February 2012). "Kafr Kanna" (124). Hadashot Arkheologiyot – Excavations and Surveys in Israel.
- Alexandre, Yardenna (28 February 2013). "Kafr Kanna" (125). Hadashot Arkheologiyot – Excavations and Surveys in Israel.
- Alexandre, Yardenna (31 December 2013). "Kafr Kanna" (125). Hadashot Arkheologiyot – Excavations and Surveys in Israel.
- Barron, J.B., ed. (1923). Palestine: Report and General Abstracts of the Census of 1922. Government of Palestine.
- Conder, C.R.; Kitchener, H.H. (1881). The Survey of Western Palestine: Memoirs of the Topography, Orography, Hydrography, and Archaeology. Vol. 1. London: Committee of the Palestine Exploration Fund.
- David, Abraham (24 May 2010). To Come to the Land: Immigration and Settlement in 16th-Century Eretz-Israel. University of Alabama Press. ISBN 978-0-8173-5643-9.
- Ellenblum, R. (2003). Frankish Rural Settlement in the Latin Kingdom of Jerusalem. Cambridge University Press. ISBN 9780521521871.
- Government of Palestine, Department of Statistics (1945). Village Statistics, April, 1945.
- Guérin, V. (1880). Description Géographique Historique et Archéologique de la Palestine (in French). Vol. 3: Galilee, pt. 1. Paris: L'Imprimerie Nationale. (pp. 168 -182
- Hadawi, S. (1970). Village Statistics of 1945: A Classification of Land and Area ownership in Palestine. Palestine Liberation Organization Research Center.
- Hütteroth, W.-D.; Abdulfattah, K. (1977). Historical Geography of Palestine, Transjordan and Southern Syria in the Late 16th Century. Erlanger Geographische Arbeiten, Sonderband 5. Erlangen, Germany: Vorstand der Fränkischen Geographischen Gesellschaft. ISBN 3-920405-41-2.
- Joudah, Ahmad Hasan (2013). Revolt in Palestine in the Eighteenth Century: The Era of Shaykh Zahir al-Umar (Second ed.). Piscataway, New Jersey: Gorgias Press. ISBN 978-1-4632-0002-2.
- Karmon, Y. (1960). "An Analysis of Jacotin's Map of Palestine" (PDF). Israel Exploration Journal. 10 (3, 4): 155–173, 244–253. Archived from the original (PDF) on 22 December 2019.
- Le Strange, G. (1890). Palestine Under the Moslems: A Description of Syria and the Holy Land from A.D. 650 to 1500. London: Committee of the Palestine Exploration Fund.
- Mariti, G. (1792). Travels Through Cyprus, Syria, and Palestine; with a General History of the Levant. Vol. 1. Dublin: P. Byrne. (p. 351 ff)
- Mills, E., ed. (1932). Census of Palestine 1931. Population of Villages, Towns and Administrative Areas. Jerusalem: Government of Palestine.
- Morris, B. (2004). The Birth of the Palestinian Refugee Problem Revisited. Cambridge University Press. ISBN 978-0-521-00967-6.
- Palmer, E.H. (1881). The Survey of Western Palestine: Arabic and English Name Lists Collected During the Survey by Lieutenants Conder and Kitchener, R. E. Transliterated and Explained by E.H. Palmer. Committee of the Palestine Exploration Fund.
- Pappe, I. (2011). The Forgotten Palestinians. A History of the Palestinians in Israel. Yale University Press. ISBN 978-0-300-13441-4.
- Petersen, Andrew (2005). The Towns of Palestine Under Muslim Rule. British Archaeological Reports. ISBN 1841718211.
- Pringle, D. (1993). The Churches of the Crusader Kingdom of Jerusalem: A-K (excluding Acre and Jerusalem). Vol. I. Cambridge University Press. ISBN 0-521-39036-2.
- Pringle, D. (1997). Secular buildings in the Crusader Kingdom of Jerusalem: an archaeological Gazetter. Cambridge University Press. ISBN 0521-46010-7.
- Rhode, H. (1979). Administration and Population of the Sancak of Safed in the Sixteenth Century (PhD). Columbia University. Archived from the original on 1 March 2020.
- Röhricht, R. (1893). (RRH) Regesta regni Hierosolymitani (MXCVII-MCCXCI) (in Latin). Berlin: Libraria Academica Wageriana.
- Schumacher, G. (1888). "Population list of the Liwa of Akka". Quarterly Statement - Palestine Exploration Fund. 20: 169–191.
- Thomson, W.M. (1859). The Land and the Book: Or, Biblical Illustrations Drawn from the Manners and Customs, the Scenes and Scenery, of the Holy Land. Vol. 2 (1 ed.). New York: Harper & brothers.
