= Karmi'el Natural Region =

Coordinates: 32°54′49″N 35°17′46″E

- Natural Region
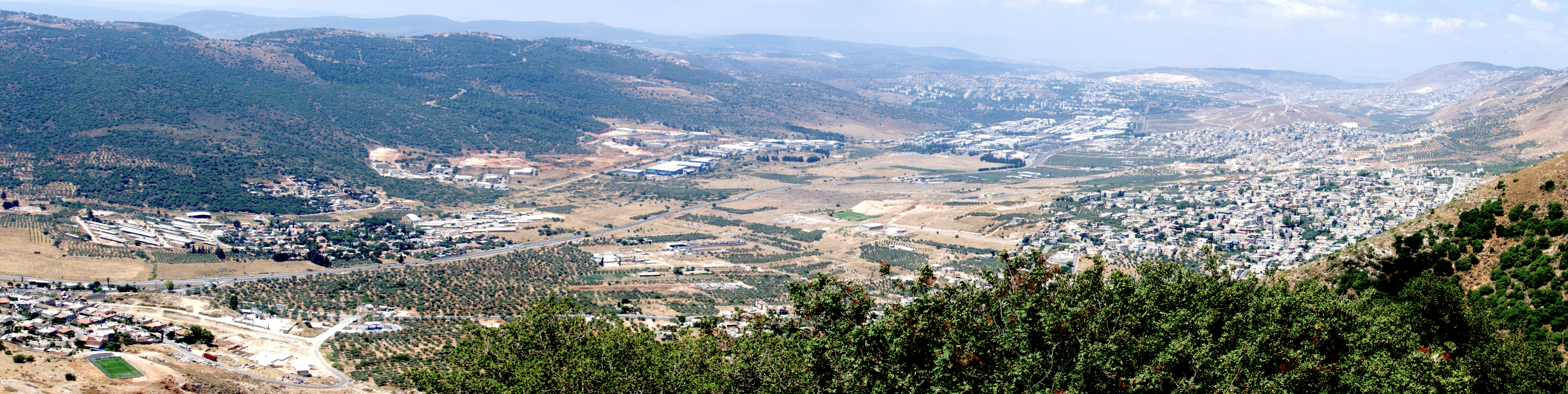
- View of the Beit HaKerem Valley
- Interactive map of Karmi'el Natural Region
- Country: Israel
- District: Northern
- Subdistrict: Acre
- Largest City: Karmiel

Area
  - Total: 109 km^{2} (42 sq mi)

Population (2024)
  - Total: 124,110

Ethnicity
  - Jews and others: 40.6%
  - Arabs: 58.9%

The Karmi'el Natural Region is a natural region in the Acre Subdistrict, in the Northern District of Israel. Karmiel is the largest city in the natural region.

== Geography ==
Districts, Subdistricts and Natural Regions of the State of Israel, 2018

The natural region consists of a swath of towns and small cities in the Beit HaKerem Valley, at the border of the Upper and Lower Galilee, due east of Acre. It has an area of 109 km^{2}. The largest city is Karmiel, containing 39 percent of the natural region's population. Other large towns in the natural region are Majd al-Krum, Deir al-Asad, Nahf, and Rameh. Highway 85 runs through the natural region, connecting it with Acre to the west and the Korazim Plateau and Safed to the east. It contains a portion of the Misgav Regional Council, as well as one village of the Merom HaGalil Regional Council.

== Demographics ==
The natural region has an Arab majority of 59 percent and a large Jewish minority of 41 percent. Karmiel is a Jewish city, while the other large towns nearby are all inhabited by Arabs. Sajur is a Druze town, while Rameh is religiously mixed between Christians, Druze, and Muslims.

Historical population
Year	Pop.	±%
1972	17,400	—
1983	34,500	+98.3%
1995	63,100	+82.9%
2008	105,000	+66.4%
2022	121,350	+15.6%
2024	124,110	+2.3%

== Administrative local authorities ==
Cities	Local Councils	Villages
Karmiel	Bi'ina; Deir al-Asad; Majd al-Krum; Nahf; Rameh; Sajur	Merom HaGalil: Shezor; Misgav: Gilon; Hussniyya; Kammaneh; Kamon; Lotem; Ma'ale Tzviya; Mikhmanim; Moran; Ras al-Ein; Sallama; Shorashim; Tzurit

== Voting Patterns ==
In the 2022 election, 48 percent of voters in the natural region voted for the Arab parties, while 30 percent voted for the parties of the center-left coalition led by Yair Lapid and 22 percent voted for the parties of the right-wing coalition led by Benjamin Netanyahu.

In the 2026 election, 53 percent of voters in the natural region voted for the Arab parties, while 26 percent voted for the parties of the center-left coalition led by Gadi Eisenkot and 17 percent voted for the parties of the right-wing coalition led by Benjamin Netanyahu. An additional 1.5 percent voted for the Reservists, and 1.7 percent voted for Amcha Yisrael. Voter turnout increased 30 percent from the 2022 election.
