= Eshhar =

Community settlement in northern Israel

Eshhar: אֶשְׁחָר (Hebrew)

Hebrew transcription(s)
  - Unofficial: = Eshchar
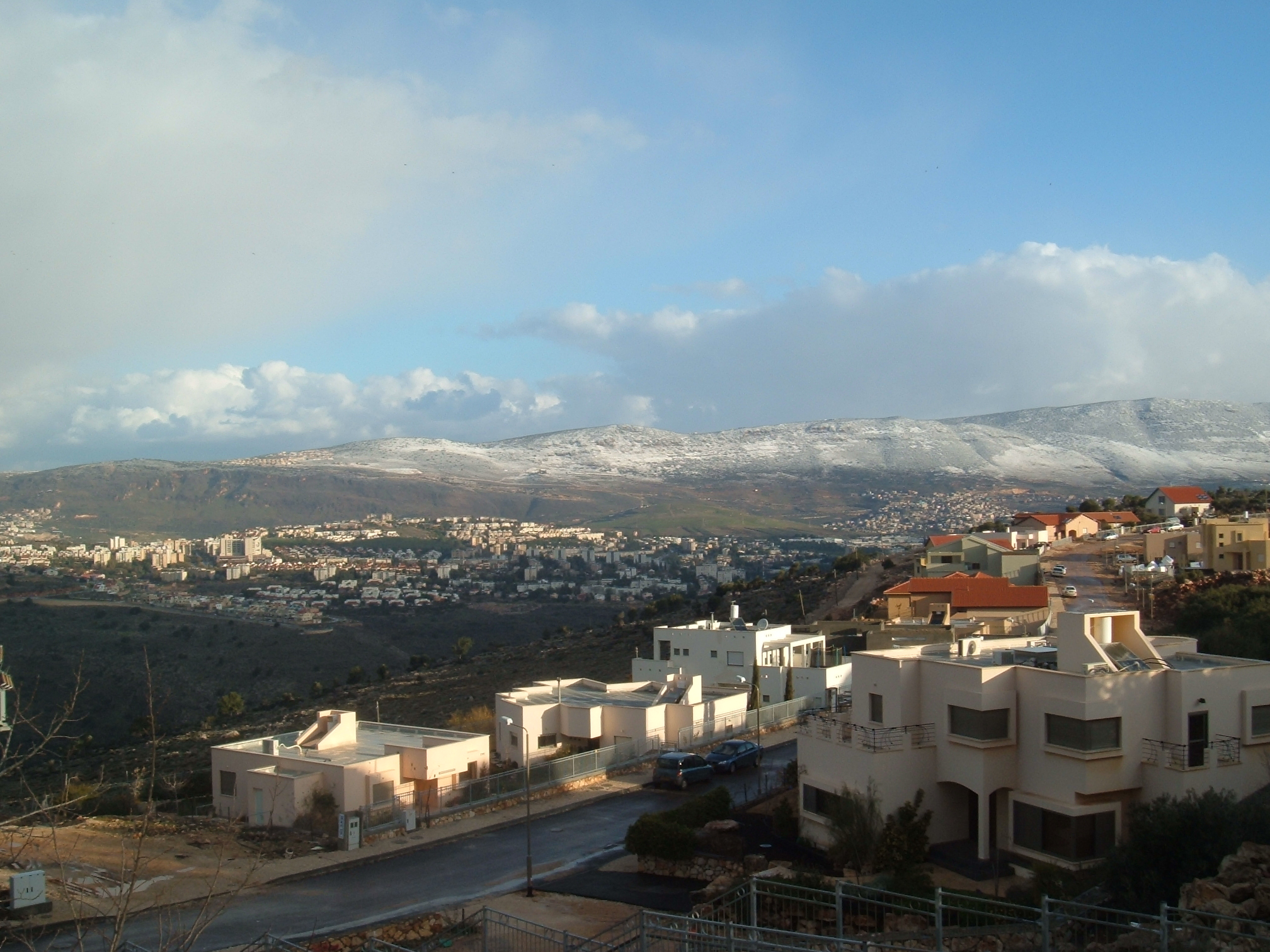
- Etymology: Rhamnus palaestinus
- Location within Northwest Israel Location within Israel
- Coordinates: 32°53′6″N 35°18′5″E
- Country: Israel
- District: Northern
- Subdistrict: Acre
- Council: Misgav
- Affiliation: HaMerkaz HaHakla'i
- Founded: 1986
- Founder: American Jews
- Population (2024): 1,000

Eshhar (Hebrew: אֶשְׁחָר) is a community settlement in northern Israel. Located in the Galilee to the south of Karmiel and north of Sakhnin, it falls under the jurisdiction of Misgav Regional Council. In 2024 it had a population of 1,000. It is adjacent to the Bedouin village of Arab al-Na'im, with which it shares an access road.

== History ==
In 1979, a group of Jews in Chicago came up with a plan to establish a joint secular-religious community in Israel. Eshhar was established in 1986 by a gar'in comprising this group and other English-speaking and Israeli families.

The community was named for the Rhamnus palaestinus (buckthorn), "eshhar" in Hebrew. Residents avoid driving within the village on Shabbat and public events are kosher. Beyond this, residents define their own lifestyles, without coercion, they seek "to live together in harmony and in an atmosphere of tolerance and openness".

The local Tzofim scout group is open to both religious and secular youth.

Plans for a pluralistic Meguvan-affiliated elementary school failed due to legal issues and opposition from the Ministry of Education and the Regional Council. An attempt to establish such a school in Moreshet failed for similar reasons. Children attend local religious or secular schools instead.

Relations with the adjacent hillside Bedouin village of Arab al-Na'im are generally good, based on a firm footing established in initial meetings between the councils of the two villages in the 1990s, when it was agreed that "good neighborly relations" would be a pragmatic and helpful arrangement. Eshhar as a community, along with other Jewish organizations, have been involved in supporting Arab al-Na'im's leaders in obtaining state recognition and, subsequently, connection to municipal services and the institution of a master plan for the village, enabling the first permanent masonry-built houses to be constructed there in 2014.

== Facilities ==
Facilities in the village include an Orthodox synagogue and community hall opened in 2014, a mikveh, a small petting zoo, a library, outdoor sports facilities and young children playgrounds, a community pub, a community orchard and several walking trails. There is a nursery for children from the age of three months to three years, and three kindergartens.

Construction of a new neighborhood (Shlav - Stage "Daled 1") started in 2021 with many cottages getting populated over 2022-23. Groundwork for a further neighborhood expansion (Stage Daled 2) is being initiated in the near future . Future expansion of the village (Daled 2-3) is planned.
