= Highway 85 (Israel) =

Highway in Israel

Coordinates: 32°55′30″N 35°17′55″E

Highway 85
- כביש 85
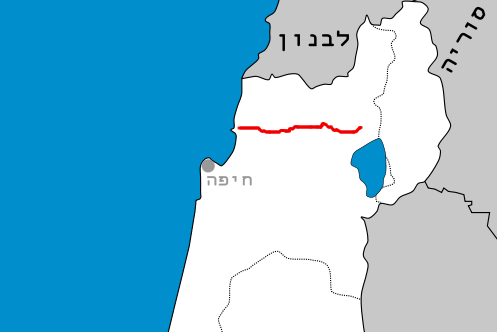

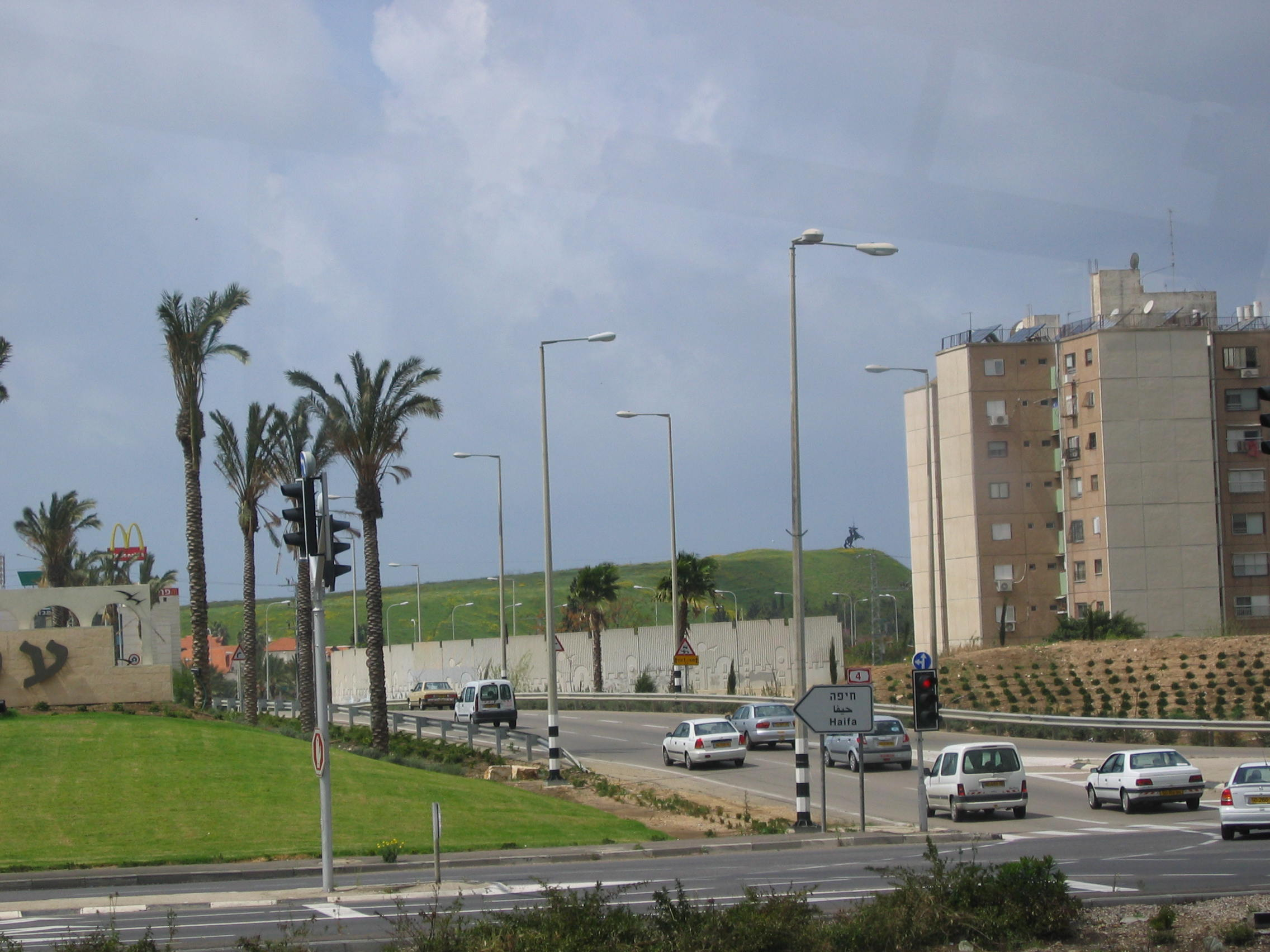
- Highway 85 in Acre

Route information
- Length: 47 km (29 mi)

Major junctions
- West end: Tel Akko Junction
- East end: Amiad Junction

Location
- Country: Israel

Highway system
- Roads in Israel; Highways
← Highway 80	→ Highway 87

Highway 85 is an east-west highway in Northern Israel. It is one of the most important roads through the Galilee, connecting western and eastern Galilee. Highway 85 begins in Akko on the west coast of Israel and ends in the east just north of Lake Kinneret.

Highway 85 begins at Highway 4 in Akko in the west and ends at Amiad junction at Highway 90 near Korazim in the east. Akko and Hananya Junction follows an ancient East-West transportation route through the Beit Hakereem Valley, where it historically connected the Mediterranean Coast with the Eastern Galilee and the Sea of Galilee Region. The Beit Hakereem Valley route was one of the easiest crossings of the Galilee because it provided a relatively low East-West passage between the mountains.

== Junctions and Interchanges on the highway ==
- Acre (Akko)
- Tel Akko junction with
- Akko east junction with highway 4
- Kfar Yassif junction with highway 70
- Ahihud junction with highway 70

There are plans to replace the two junctions at Ahihud and Kfar Yasif with one interchange.

- Tzurit-Gilon
- Majd al-Krum
- Bi'ana junction
- Karmiel west junction with route 784

The Junction karmiel west will be Interchange

- Karmiel junction
- Nahf
- Kamanneh-Mikhmanim-Kamon
- Shezor
- Sajur
- Rameh junction with route 864
- Moran (kibbutz)
- Kfar Hananya
- Halafta junction
- Nahal Amud Interchange highway 65
- Kahal Interchange
- Ami'ad Interchange with highway 90

== See also ==
- Railway to Karmiel
- List of highways in Israel
