= Har Halutz =

Community settlement in northern Israel

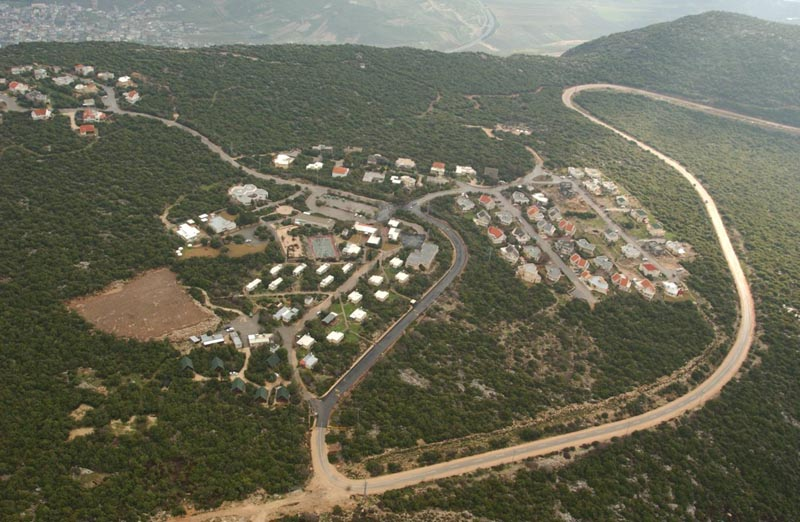

- Location within Northwest Israel
- Coordinates: 32°57′2″N 35°18′44″E
- Country: Israel
- District: Northern
- Subdistrict: Acre
- Council: Misgav
- Affiliation: HaMerkaz HaHakla'i
- Founded: 1985
- Founder: American immigrants
- Population (2024): 577
- Website: www.halutz.org.il

Har Halutz (Hebrew: הַר חָלוּץ, lit. Pioneer Hill), officially known as Halutz (Hebrew: חָלוּץ, Pioneer) is a community settlement in the central Galilee in northern Israel. Har Halutz is located in the rocky terrain of Gush Tefen and belongs to the Misgav Regional Council. In 2024 it had a population of 577.

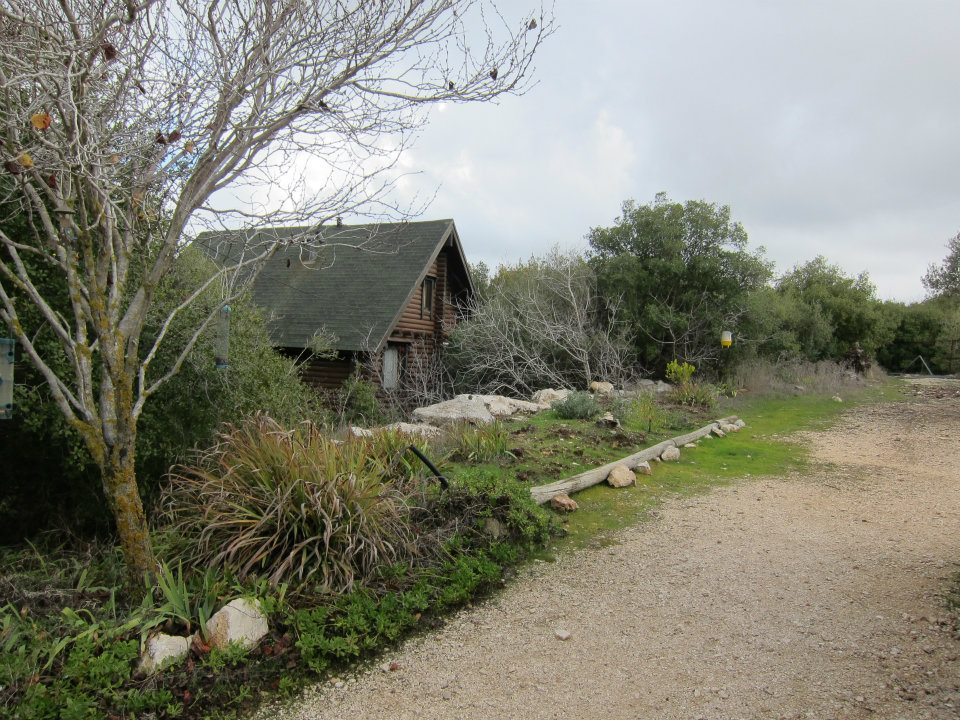
Home in Har Halutz

Har Halutz members work in nearby towns or create new employment opportunities on or near the site. Har Halutz has two office buildings with small offices that it rents to members requiring office space. The community synagogue provides worship services, festival activities and lifecycle celebrations.

Community life at Har Halutz centers on holiday celebrations. Families take turns organizing the holiday activities and are given a free hand to create a memorable event for the entire community.

== History ==
Har Halutz was originally settled by a gar'in that was established in the United States during the early 1980s under the auspices of the Israel Movement for Reform and Progressive Judaism (Reform Movement). The nine families who moved up to the location in 1985 consisted of a mix of English-speaking immigrants and native Israelis. Over the years Har Halutz has continued to attract immigrant families from around the world, although the majority of new families are native Israelis.

The Master Plan for Har Halutz calls for 330 single-family detached homes located in approximately six neighborhoods. These neighborhoods surround a core service center that currently includes a day-care center, kindergarten, two office buildings, a youth center and a combined synagogue/community center. As of September 2013, there were approximately 110 families living in the settlement.

Just west of the town is the hill named Har Halutz. Archaeologists say that the mountain hasn't had a permanent settlement since the days of the Second Temple. Nearby, an ancient earth-filled stone wall was found.

== Geography ==
Nearby Mount Halutz is 798 meters high. Mount Halutz is not called Mount Lavon despite Lavon not only also being on said mountain, but also being an older settlement. The village of Har Halutz is 760 meters high. Har Halutz has a hot summer Mediterranean climate. On average, snow falls once a year. Average annual precipitation is around 800 mm, falling almost entirely between October and May.
