= Halutz =

Halutz or chalutz is an early Jewish immigrant to Israel. It may refer to:

- Dan Halutz (born 1948), Israeli military commander
- Har Halutz (Mount Halutz), or simply Halutz, a community settlement in Galilee, Israel

== See also ==
- HeHalutz, "The Pioneer", a Zionist Jewish youth movement
