= Manof =

Community settlement in northern Israel

Manof: מנוף (Hebrew)
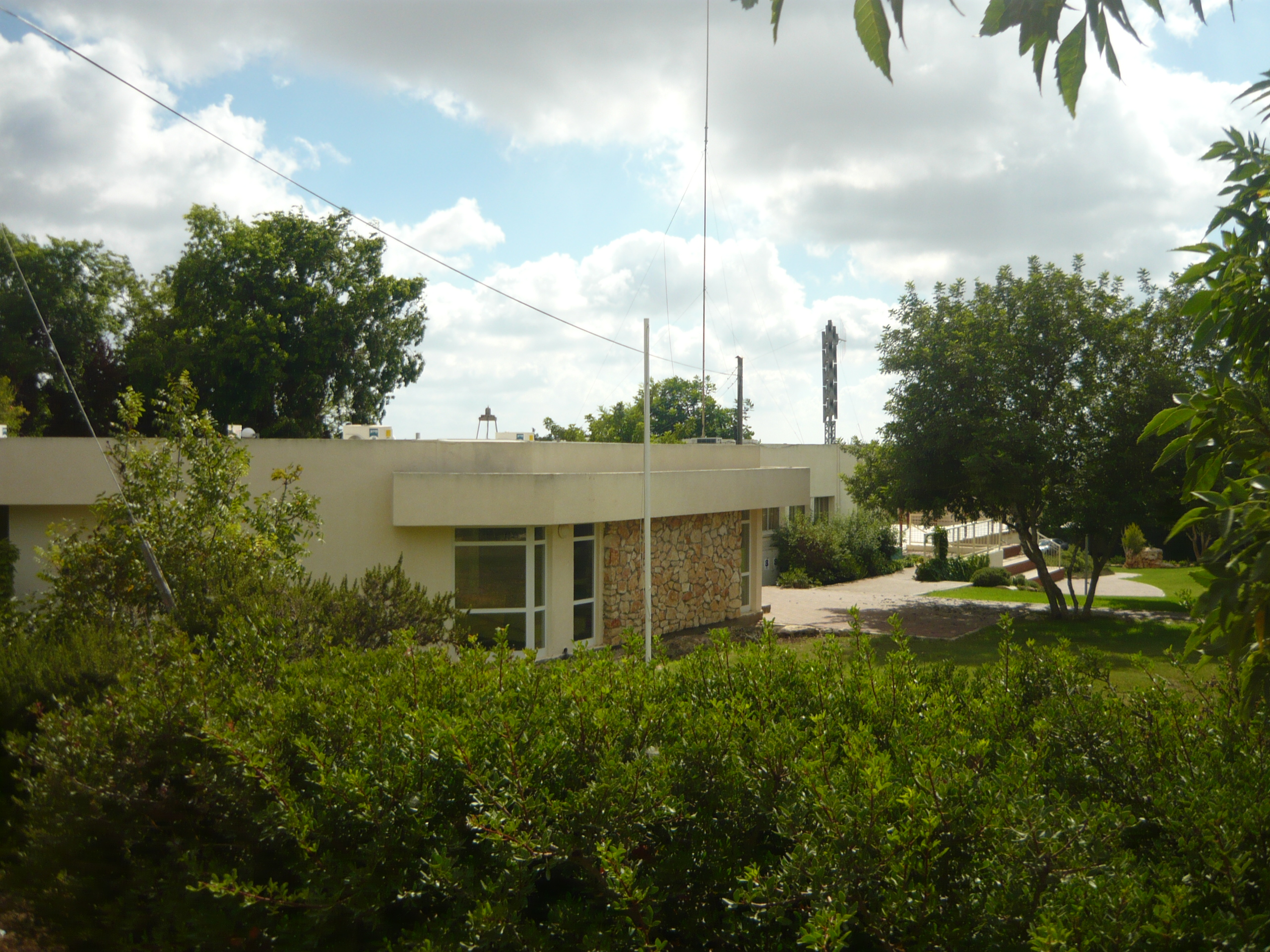
- Village synagogue

- Location within Northwest Israel Location within Israel
- Coordinates: 32°51′9″N 35°14′22″E
- Country: Israel
- District: Northern
- Subdistrict: Acre
- Council: Misgav
- Affiliation: Agricultural Union
- Founded: 1980
- Founder: South African Jews
- Population (2024): 834

Manof (Hebrew: מָנוֹף, lit. 'Crane') is a community settlement in northern Israel. Located on Mount Shekhanya in the Lower Galilee, about 30 km northeast of Haifa and at an average elevation is 382 meters above sea level, it falls under the jurisdiction of Misgav Regional Council. In 2024 it had a population of 834.

== History ==
Manof was established in 1980 by a group of South African immigrants, on land located near the Palestinian village of Mi'ar, which had been depopulated in 1948.

== Facilities ==
As of 2015 Manof includes 175 single-family detached homes. Additional town facilities include a grocery store, preschools for children aged 1–6 (up to kindergarten), a playground, ball courts (for soccer, tennis and basketball), a synagogue, a small library, and a small petting zoo.

Beyond kindergarten, there are no schools inside Manof. Most Manof children go, via school bus, to the Har Shekhanya elementary school in the adjacent town of Shekhanya (for grades 1-6), and then for grades 7-12 go to the Misgav highschool in the nearby (10-minute drive) Misgav regional council center. The council center houses various other facilities, such as healthcare, a gym and pool, a library, after-school activities for children, and more.

There are only a few small places of business in Manof's industrial zone, including a small chocolate factory, a plant nursery, an art therapy studio and a sport shop. A few other residents have a home business, or work from home. But the majority of the Manof residents work outside Manof, often nearby cities such as Haifa or Karmiel. As such, Manof is often considered a commuter town.

== Politics ==
In the 2009 elections, 317 people voted in Manof. 44% of the votes went to Kadima, 26% went to the Israeli Labor Party, 10% to each of Meretz and Likud, 5% to the Green Movement and 2% or less to other parties.

In the 2013 elections, 361 people voted in Manof. 29% of the votes went to the Israeli Labor Party, 29% went to Yesh Atid, 19% to Meretz, 10% to Hatnuah, 6% to Likud and 2% or less to other parties.

In the 2015 elections, 416 people voted in Manof (out of the 555 eligible). 59% of the votes went to the Israeli Labor Party, 18% went to Yesh Atid, 14% to Meretz, 3% to Kulanu, 3% to Likud and 2% or less to other parties.

== Fun Run ==
The Manof Fun Run is an annual tradition kept in Manof since 1980. The Fun Run is an amateur running event, going uphill along the road into Manof. The video linked below which shows life in Manof in 1980 centers around that year's Manof Fun Run.

The Fun Run started as a local Manof event, but in recent years has become popular with residents of other towns in the Misgav area, and is now formally named the Misgav Race. The race is actually several races of different lengths (2.5 km to 10 km), and a 2 km non-competitive family run. All races end in the center of Manof, where runners and their families can find food stands, art activities, and other attractions.

== Notable residents ==
- Vered Polgar, Miss Israel 1979, judge
