= Yahad, Israel =

Yahad
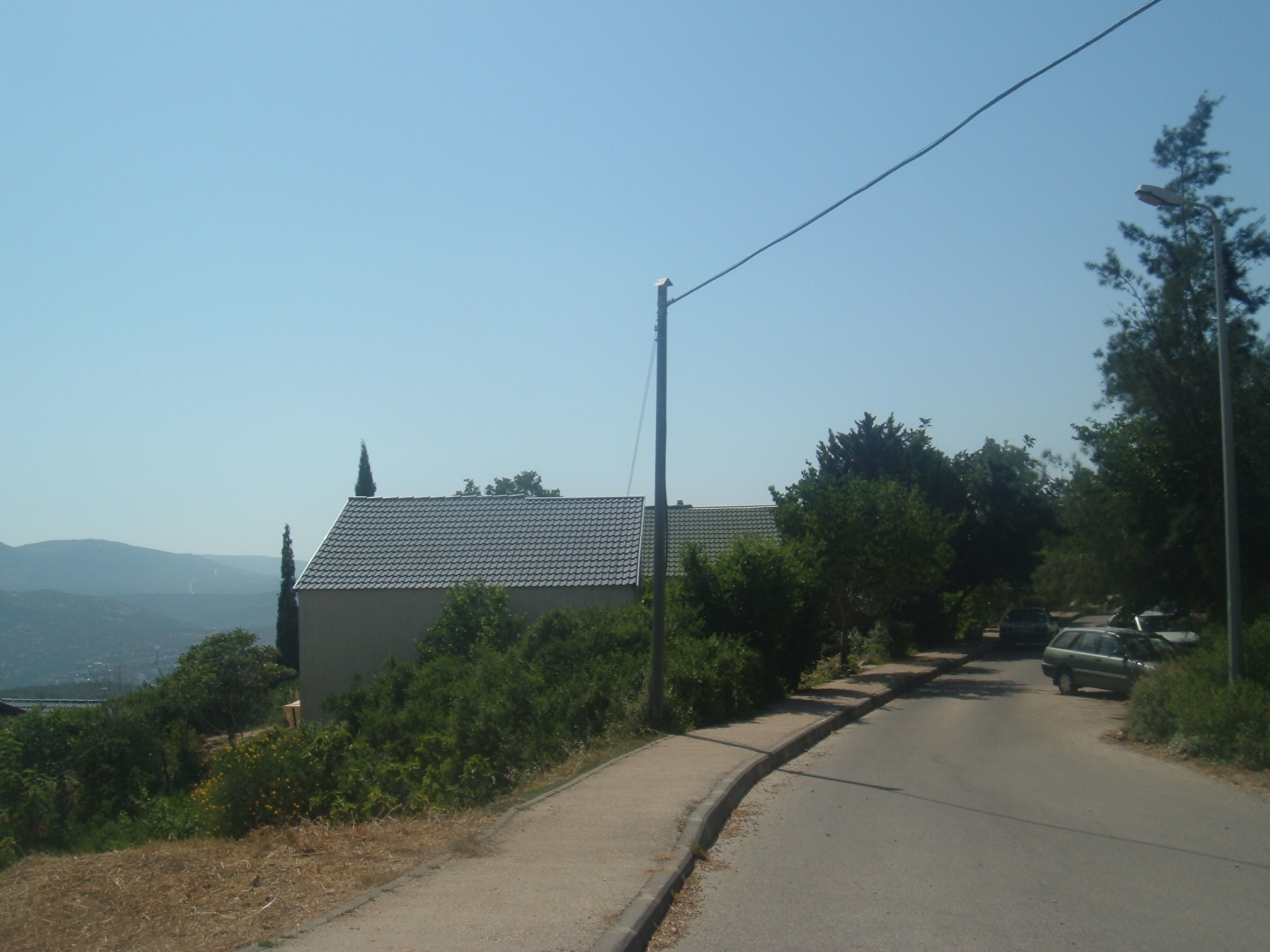

- Location within Northwest Israel
- Coordinates: 32°50′45″N 35°21′43″E
- Country: Israel
- District: Northern
- Subdistrict: Acre
- Council: Misgav
- Region: Lower Galilee
- Founded: 1992
- Founder: Transcendental Meditation followers

Yahad (Hebrew: יחד, lit. 'Together') is a small kibbutz in northern Israel. Located in the Lower Galilee, it falls under the jurisdiction of Misgav Regional Council.

The kibbutz was founded in 1992 by a gar'in whose members were involved in Transcendental Meditation.
