= Tal-El =

Tal El
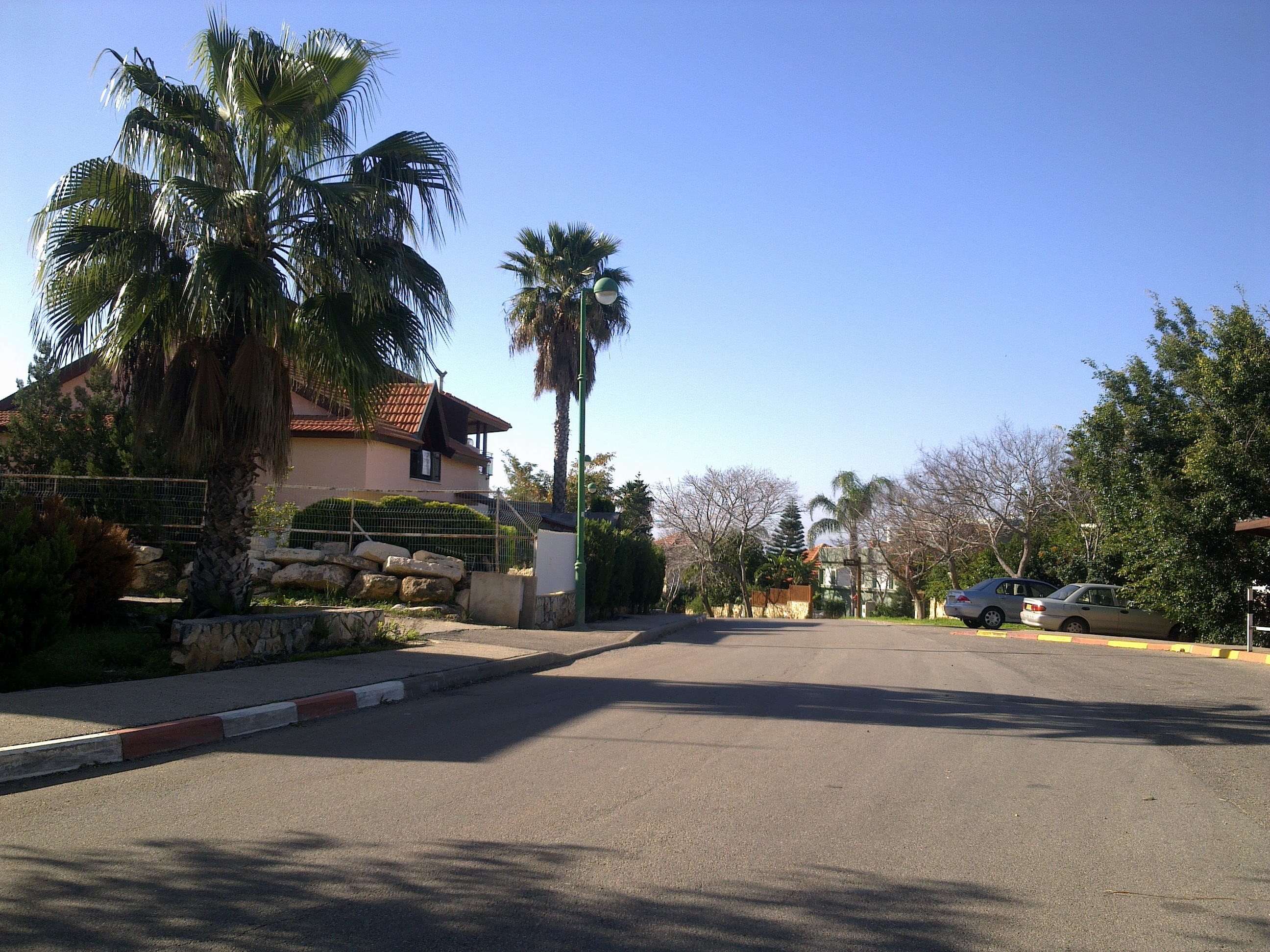

- Location within Northwest Israel
- Coordinates: 32°55′37″N 35°10′45″E
- Country: Israel
- District: Northern
- Subdistrict: Acre
- Council: Misgav
- Affiliation: HaMerkaz HaHakla'i
- Founded: 1980
- Population (2024): 1,316

Tal El (Hebrew: טַל-אֵל, lit. God's Dew) is a community settlement in northern Israel. Located in the Galilee between Acre and Karmiel, it falls under the jurisdiction of Misgav Regional Council. In 2024 it had a population of 1,316.

== History ==
The village was established in 1980 by ten families from the Soviet Union and two from Israel. The name was chosen because the tribe of Asher, who lived in this area, and the whole of Israel were blessed with dew from heaven. (Deuteronomy 33:24-28)
