= Tubal (disambiguation) =

Tubal was a son of Japheth, son of Noah.

Tubal may also refer to:

- Tubal-cain, a figure in Genesis 4.
- Tubal (character), a character in The Merchant of Venice
- Tubal Rabbi Cain (born 1964), Nigerian writer
- Tubal Uriah Butler (1897-1977), Grenadian-born preacher and labour leader in Trinidad and Tobago
- Tubalar, a Turkic people in Siberia

== See also ==
- Tabal
- Tuval
