= Avtalion =

Avtalion: אבטליון (Hebrew)

Hebrew transcription(s)
  - Official: Avtalyon
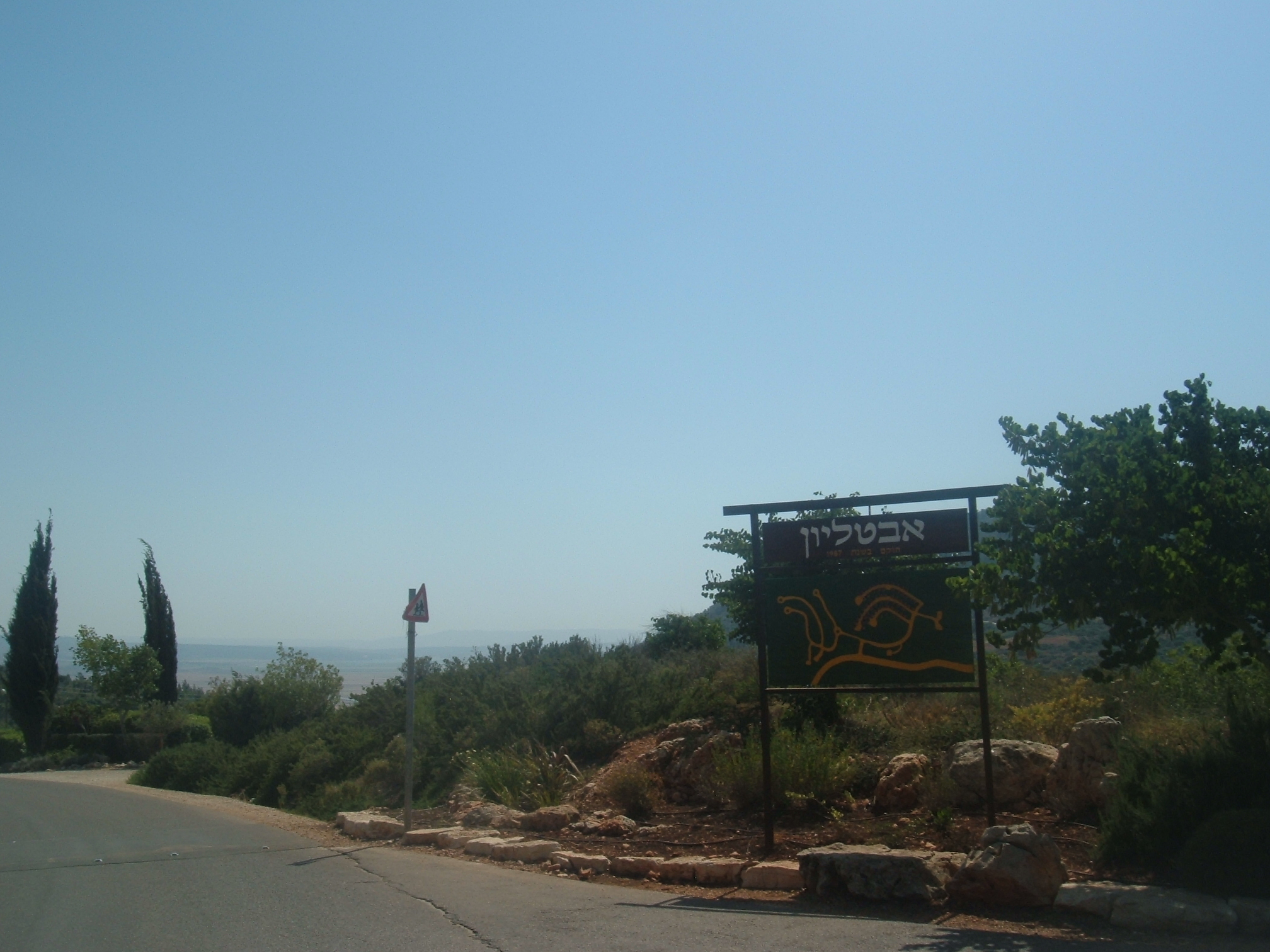

- Location within Northeast Israel Location within Israel
- Coordinates: 32°50′13″N 35°20′50″E
- Country: Israel
- District: Northern
- Subdistrict: Acre
- Council: Misgav
- Affiliation: Agricultural Union
- Founded: 1987
- Population (2024): 466

Avtalion (Hebrew: אבטליון) is a community settlement in northern Israel. Located in the Lower Galilee to the south of Arraba, it falls under the jurisdiction of Misgav Regional Council. In 2024 it had a population of 466.

== History ==
The village was established in 1987 as a moshav shitufi, and was named after Abtalion, a rabbinic sage in the early pre-Mishnaic era. It was later converted to a community settlement. Avtalion is known for its production of olive oil.

== Election Results ==
About 77% of Avtalion's eligible voters voted in the 2026 Israeli legislative elections, compared with a 78% national voter turnout. Yashar received about 31% of Avtalion's votes, followed by The Democrats with 30% and Together with 19%.
