= Selamin =

Town fortified by Josephus during First Jewish Revolt

- Tzalmon; Salmon; Selame; Salamis; Kh. Sellameh
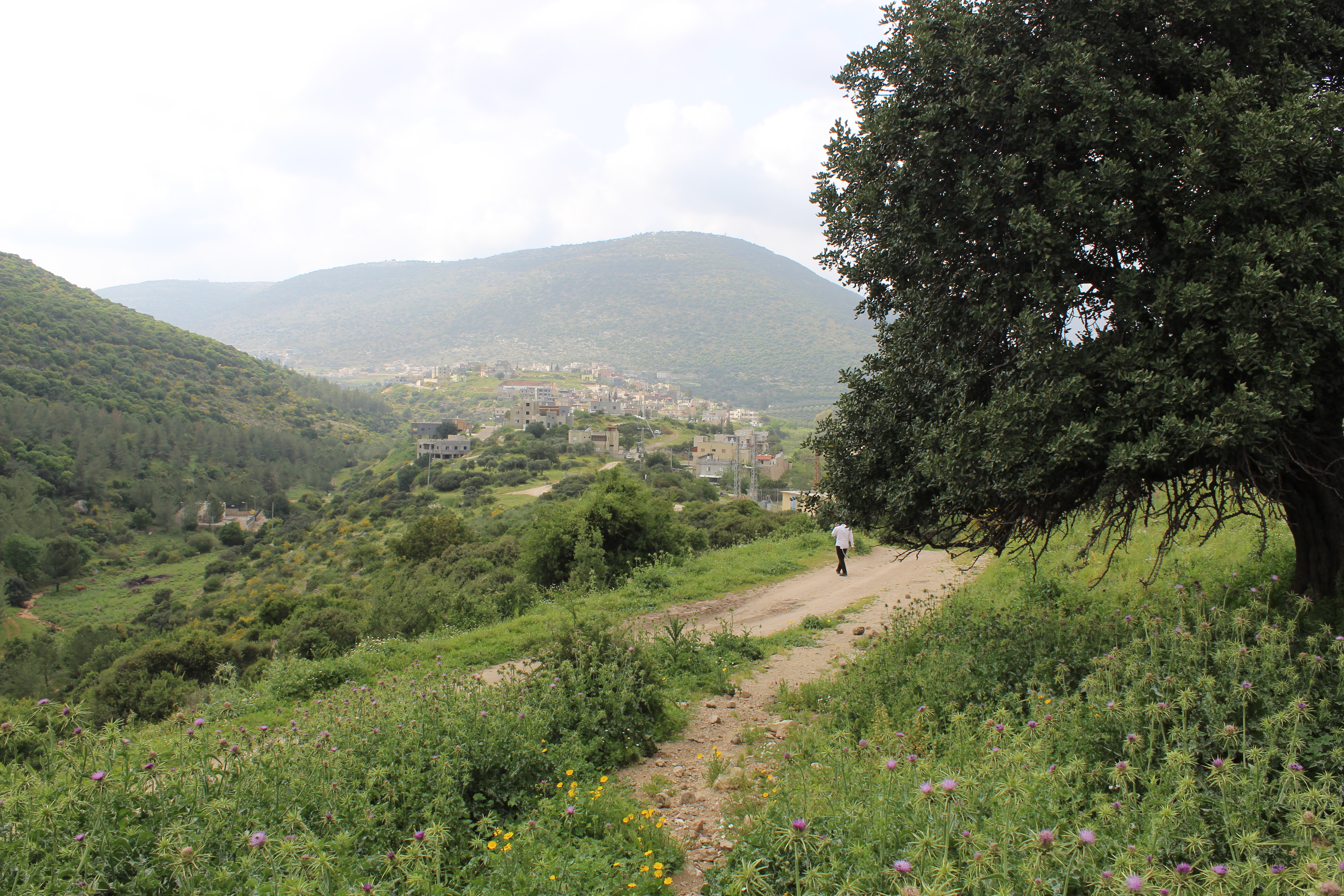
- Sallama village as seen from the ruin of Selamin
- Interactive map of Selamin
- Nearest city: Maghar, Israel
- Coordinates: 32°53′2.99″N 35°22′48.04″E
- Established: Hellenistic period

Selamin (Hebrew: צלמין)(Greek: Σελάμην), also known as Tzalmon, Selame, Salamis / Salamin, Zalmon, and Khurbet es Salâmeh (the Ruin of Salameh), was a Jewish village in Lower Galilee during the Second Temple period, formerly fortified by Josephus, and which was captured by the Roman Imperial army in circa 64 CE. Today, the ruin is designated as a historical site and lies directly south of the Wadi Zalmon National Park in Israel's Northern District.

German orientalist E.G. Schultz was the first to identify the site in 1847. The site today is directly adjacent to the Bedouin village (formerly a Druze village), Sallama, towards the village's southeast, situated on a spur of a hill near Mount Salameh (now Har Tzalmon), on the eastern bank of Wady es Salameh ("Valley of Salameh"), or what is known in Hebrew as Nahal Tzalmon. The valley runs in a northerly-southerly direction, deriving its name from Khurbet es Salameh, the said ruin of Selamin (Salamis) which formerly crowned a strong and extensive site. A road accessed by 4-wheel-drive vehicle passes by the site.

== Background ==
The Jewish population of Selamin in the 1st century-CE consisted of a sacerdotal tribe linked to the course of Dalaiah, mentioned in the apocryphal roster of Second Temple kohenim and their respective villages, and who were first named in a poem composed by Eleazar beRabbi Qallir (c. 570 – c. 640). Historical geographer, Klein, thinks that one of the Jewish priests who died in the conflagration during the Second Temple's destruction, Joseph b. Dalaiah, hailed from this village. The Jewish villagers of the town were most likely farmers, as the Mishnah (compiled in 189 CE) mentions it being a place of vineyards interspersed between planted vegetables.

The village is also mentioned in the Tosefta (Parah 9:2), a sequel to the Mishnah, where it is said to have had a natural spring which ceased to flow during the Roman siege of the town. It was in Selamin where a man cried out that a venomous snake had bitten him and that he was dying. His visage was so changed that they could not recognise him when he died. Even so, based on his testimony that he was dying from a snakebite, the rabbis permitted his widow to remarry - even though they could not discern the face of the dead, or what is known as "circumstantial evidence".

Israeli historian Bezalel Bar-Kochva thinks that the strategic importance of the site was in its geographical location, where it blocked one of the routes leading from the Phoenician territory to the eastern plateau of Lower Galilee. However, its choice as a defensive location for a fortress would scarcely make sense, seeing, in his view, it had an exposed and inferior position. In 1875, Victor Guérin visited the site where he found the remains of a rectangular enclosure, 80 x 50 paces in circumference, as well as two presses cut in the rock. The site today is fenced-off and primarily used to keep cattle. A pool made of old masonry is still shown by locals on the ancient ruin.

The inhabitants of Selamin who fought against the Imperial Roman army during the First Jewish Revolt are believed to have capitulated to the Roman army after the fall of Tarichaea.

== Archaeology ==
The site has yet to be excavated. According to Mordechai Aviam of the Institute for Galilean Archaeology at the University of Rochester who surveyed the site, "There is only a narrow saddle connecting the hill to the north-west, and it is clearly cut by a moat. On the western slope, one can see a segment of a wide wall, perhaps the remains of a defending wall." Pottery and coins were found in situ.

== Gallery ==
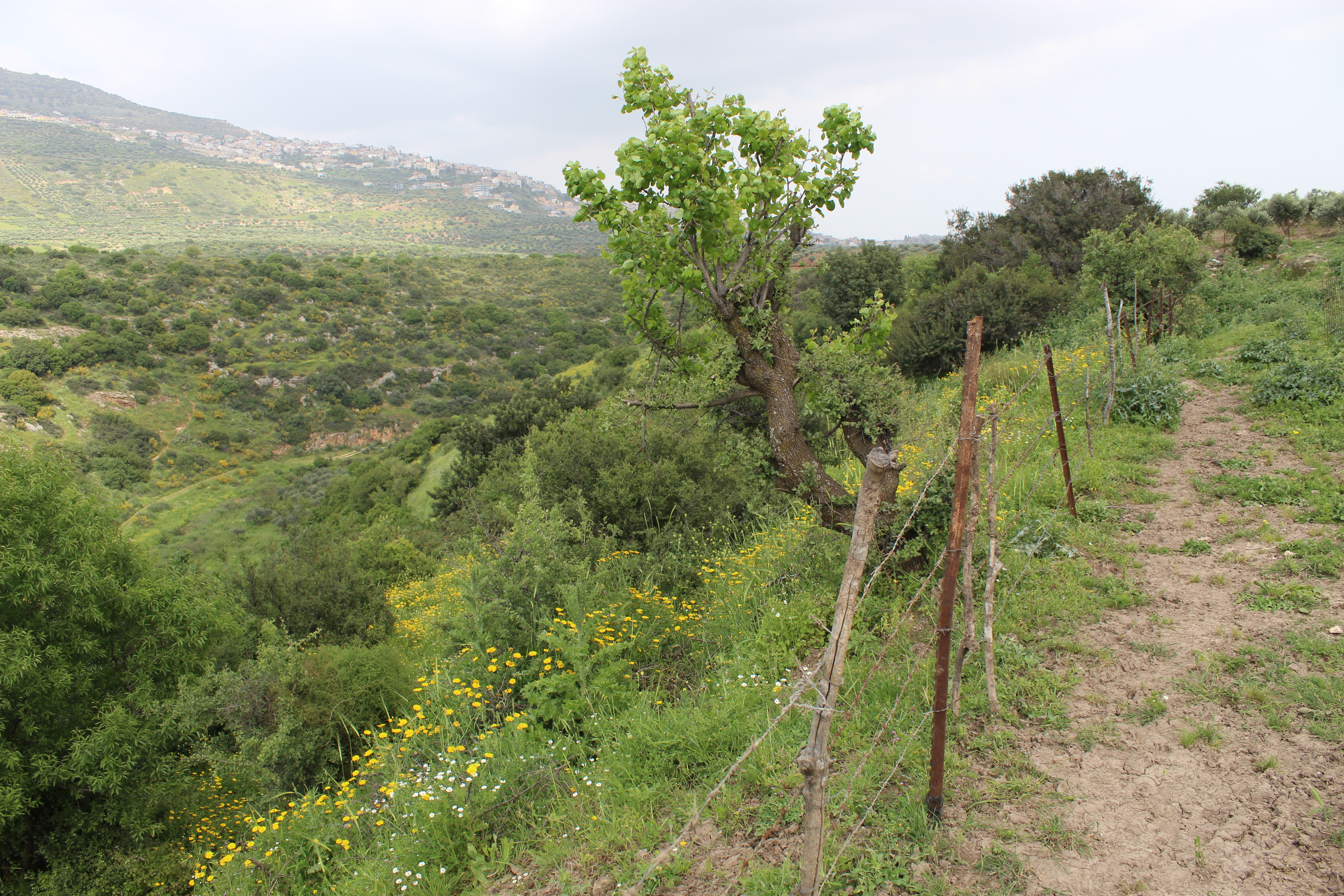
Selamin ruin, and adjacent dale

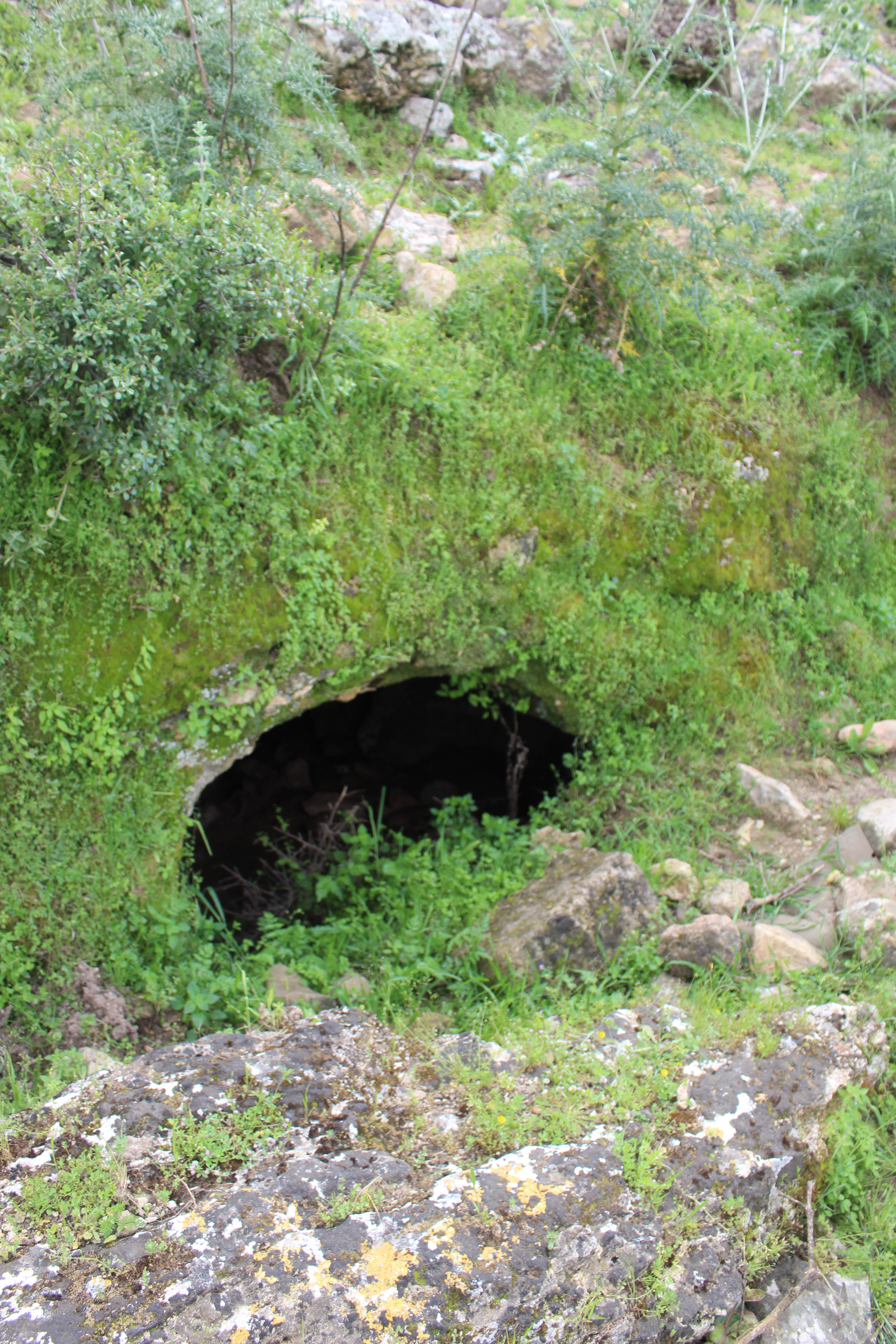
Cave in ruin of Selamin

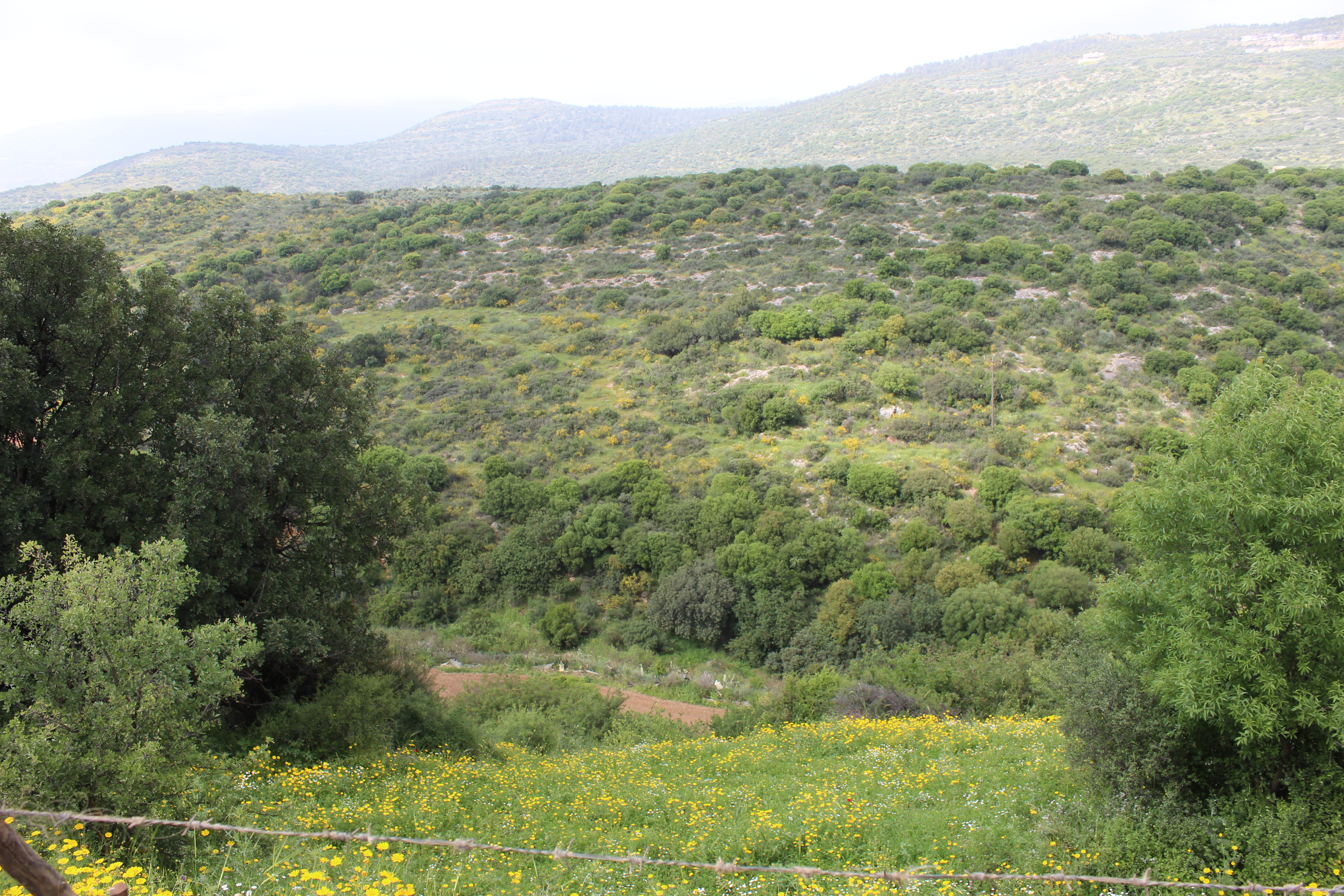
Dale directly below the site of Selamin

== Bibliography ==
- Aviam, Mordechai (1983). "The Location and Function of Josephus' Fortifications in Galilee". Cathedra: For the History of Eretz Israel and Its Yishuv. 28 (28). Jerusalem: Ben Zvi Institute: 33–46. JSTOR 23398973. (Hebrew)
- Aviam, Mordechai (2004). Jews, Pagans and Christians in the Galilee. Vol. Land of Galilee 1. Rochester, N.Y.: University of Rochester Press, Institute of Galilean Archaeology. ISBN 978-1-58046-171-9.
- Aviam, Mordechai (n.d.). "The Fortified Settlements of Josephus Flavius and Their Significance against the Background of the Excavations of Yodefat and Gamla". Academia.edu.
- Avi-Yonah, Michael (1964). "The Caesarea Inscription of the Twenty-Four Priestly Courses". Eretz-Israel: Archaeological, Historical and Geographical Studies. L.A. Mayer Memorial Volume (1895-1959): 24–28. JSTOR 23614642. (Hebrew)
- Bar-Kochva, Bezalel (1974). "Notes on the Fortresses of Josephus in Galilee". Israel Exploration Journal. 24 (2). Jerusalem: Israel Exploration Society: 108–116. JSTOR 27925451.
- Conder, C.R.; Kitchener, H.H. (1881). The Survey of Western Palestine: Memoirs of the Topography, Orography, Hydrography, and Archaeology. Vol. 1. London: Committee of the Palestine Exploration Fund.
- Firro, Kais (1992). A History of the Druzes. Vol. 1. BRILL. ISBN 978-9004094376.
- Guérin, V. (1880). Description Géographique Historique et Archéologique de la Palestine (in French). Vol. 3: Galilee, pt. 1. Paris: L'Imprimerie Nationale.
- Josephus, De Bello Judaico (The Jewish War)
- Klein, S. (1923). "Neue Beiträge zur Geschichte und Geographie Galiläas". Palästina-Studien. 1 (1). Vienna: Menorah.
- Klein, S. (1939). Sefer Ha-Yishuv (The Book of the Yishuv: A treasure of information and records, inscriptions and memoirs, preserved in Israel and in the people in the Hebrew language and in other languages on the settlement of the Land of Israel) (in Hebrew). Vol. 1. Tel-Aviv: Devir. p. 165.
- Masterman, Ernest William Gurney (1908). "Lower Galilee". The Biblical World. 32 (3). Chicago: University of Chicago Press: 159–167. doi:10.1086/474093.
- Masterman, Ernest William Gurney (1909). Studies in Galilee. Chicago: The University of Chicago press. OCLC 250486251.
- Palmer, E.H. (1881). The Survey of Western Palestine: Arabic and English Name Lists Collected During the Survey by Lieutenants Conder and Kitchener, R. E. Transliterated and Explained by E.H. Palmer. Committee of the Palestine Exploration Fund.
- Robinson, E. (1856). Later Biblical Researches in Palestine and in the Adjacent Regions - A Journal of Travels in the Year 1852. Boston: Crocker & Brewster.
- Tsafrir, Y.; Leah Di Segni; Judith Green (1994). (TIR): Tabula Imperii Romani: Judaea, Palaestina. Jerusalem: Israel Academy of Sciences and Humanities. ISBN 978-965-208-107-0.
- Zangenberg, Jürgen; Attridge, H.W.; Martin, D.B. (2007). Religion, Ethnicity, and Identity in Ancient Galilee - A Region in Transition. Tübingen, Germany: Mohr Siebeck.
