= Misgav Regional Council =

Coordinates: 32°51′N 35°15′E

Misgav משגב
- Regional council (from 1982)
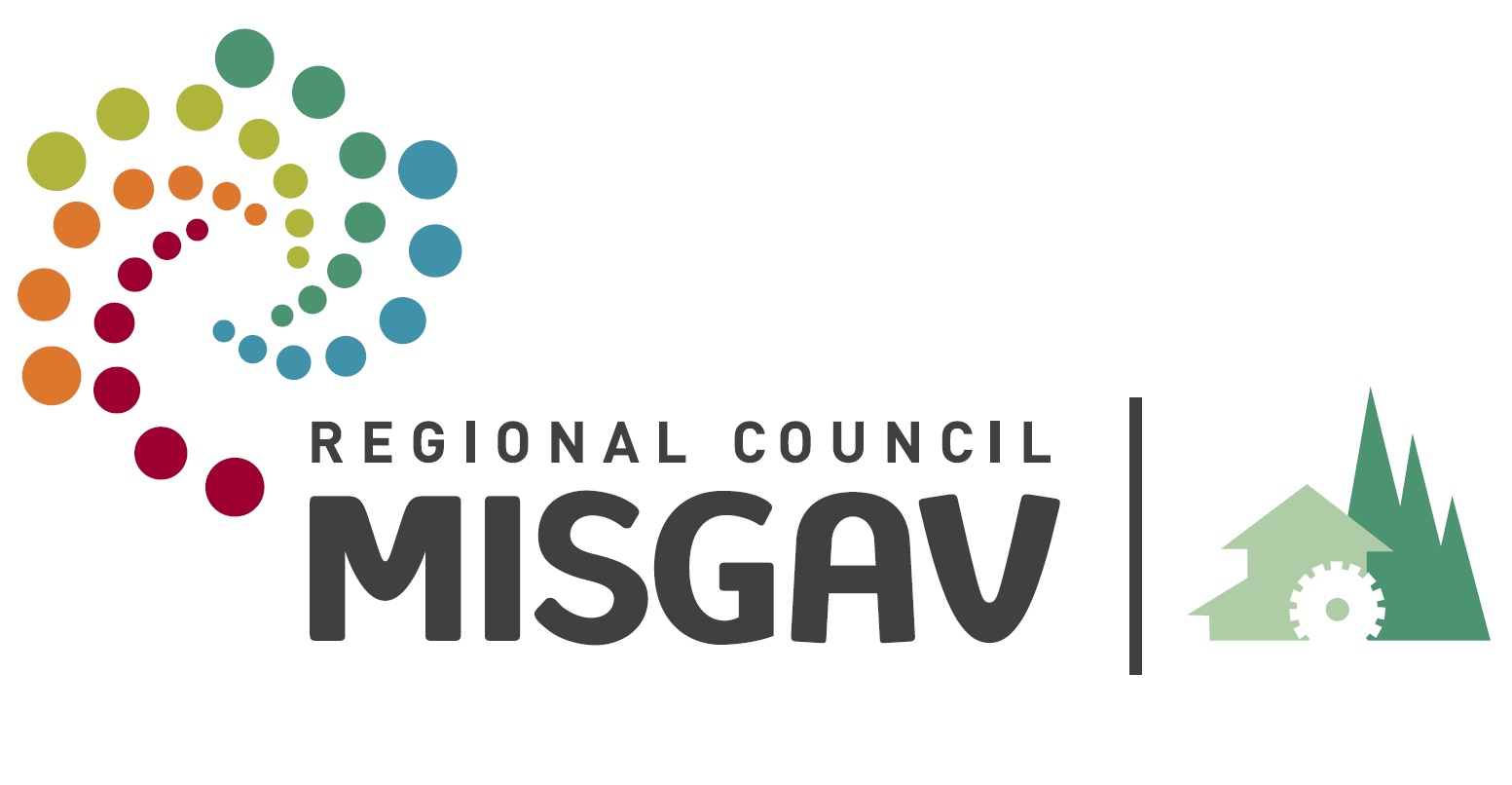
- Interactive map of Misgav
- Country: Israel
- District: Northern
- Subdistrict: Acre
- Natural region: Karmi'el, Shefar'am, Yehi'am

Government
  - Mayor: Danny Ivri

Area
  - Total: 164,560 dunams (164.56 km^{2}; 63.54 sq mi)

Population (2024)
  - Total: 30,401
  - Density: 184.74/km^{2} (478.48/sq mi)
- Website: Official website

The Misgav Regional Council (Hebrew: מועצה אזורית משגב, romanized: Mo'atza Azorit Misgav) is a regional council in the Galilee in northern Israel. The regional council is home to 30,401 people as of 2024, and comprises 35 small towns, mostly community settlements but also several kibbutzim and moshavim. The population of 29 of these is primarily Jewish, and 6 are Bedouin. The region is noted for the way that communities and non-Jewish communities live side-by-side.

== History ==
=== 20th century ===
In the early 1970s, the Galilee region in general, including what is now the area of Misgav, was predominantly populated by Arab communities including those of Druze and Bedouin origin who were living on and farming much of the arable land. Those involved in the development of the region designated that land which was not in use as nature reserves in light of the rapid urbanization which Israel was seeing at the time. That area which was not designated as a nature reserve was planned to be a series of settlements on the Galilean hilltops - the idea of the mitzpeh was conceived.

Mitzpeh literally means an observation point but the term has a much broader connotation. In Misgav, most of the villages are defined as community settlements whose inhabitants conduct their daily life completely independently from one another. Because, however, of the size of the communities, and because each community is fairly isolated a limited interdependence is required to maintain the normal frameworks and mutual interests of the residents. As a result, community run childcare centers, youth activities, and the maintenance of communal buildings and property tend to be run on a volunteer basis, unique to this region, and Israel in general, through an elected resident's committee.

From its inception, the Misgav area attracted modern day pioneers who were willing to give up basic comforts to live in temporary and cramped quarters in order to realize a pioneering dream of a better life for themselves and their children. People from the entire spectrum of political and Jewish background arrived united by an overall goal of creating a center of Jewish communal revival in the heart of the Galilee.

Misgav resembles a typical Israeli suburb surrounding a large city, except for the fact that it is spread out over an area of 50,000 acres (200 km²) with a population of just 15,000 including 4,500 Bedouin Arabs. Like the suburbs, the area houses most families in detached, one-family homes surrounded by yards, and the majority of adults drive to work in the urban centers every day while the children are bused to the local schools.

There are factors that make Misgav unique. Firstly, the sheer diversity of the communities is exemplary. Among the Misgav settlements there are five kibbutzim, including a Reform Judaism community, a Conservative Judaism community, a mixed Orthodox-Secular community, and a strictly observant Jewish village, all of which exist peacefully and respectfully alongside each other. Misgav is also unique in its relations with its non-Jewish residents and neighbors. Five local Bedouin settlements have been absorbed by the regional council and are active members of the Misgav community, which also cooperates with the large Muslim Arab, Christian Arab, and Druze populations in the region. This cooperation can be shown by the fact that the region is the location of one of the country's first dual language (Arab-Hebrew) educational institutions, the Galil Jewish-Arab School.

=== 21st century ===
In 2005, the authorities threatened to demolish a house built by an Israeli Arab resident of Sakhnin on land belonging to his family. In December 2009, Haaretz reported that the planning committee of the Misgav Local Council turned down the request of an Arab resident to build on land he owned in Mitzpe Kamon.

In the late 2000s, Nefesh B'Nefesh launched its Go North program to encourage new immigrants to move to Jewish communities in the country's northern region. The Misgav Regional Council is a partner in the program, with special emphasis on Lavon, Har Halutz, Moreshet, Eshchar, Shorashim, Manof, and Tal El. A regional bilingual call center was established in Misgav by a team of Technion students who developed an optimized work plan for the project.

== Local tourism ==
In 2009, a bicycle trail was inaugurated connecting Karmiel and the Misgav Regional Council. The 35-kilometre path passes through Karmiel, the Hilazon Riverbed Channel Junction, the olive and avocado groves of Moshav Yodfat, the Bedouin village of Sha'ab and the Hirbat Rosh Zit ruins.

== Misgav communities ==
=== Kibbutzim ===
- Eshbal
- Kishorit
- Lotem
- Moran
- Pelekh
- Tuval
- Yahad

=== Moshavim ===
- Ya'ad

=== Moshav Shitufi ===
- Yodfat

=== Community settlements ===
- Atzmon
- Avtalion
- Eshhar
- Gilon
- Har Halutz
- Hararit
- Harashim
- Kamon
- Koranit
- Lavon
- Ma'ale Tzviya
- Manof
- Mikhmanim
- Mitzpe Aviv
- Moreshet
- Rakefet
- Shekhanya
- Shorashim
- Tal El
- Tzurit
- Yuvalim

=== Bedouin villages ===
- Arab al-Na'im
- Dmeide
- Hussniyya
- Kamanneh
- Ras al-Ein
- Sallama

== Demographics ==
Historical population
Year	Pop.	±%
1972	300	—
1983	2,200	+633.3%
1995	8,600	+290.9%
2008	20,620	+139.8%
2022	29,455	+42.8%
2024	30,401	+3.2%

== Voting Patterns ==
In the 2022 election, 67 percent of voters in the regional council voted for the parties of the center-left coalition led by Yair Lapid, while 15 percent voted for the parties of the right-wing coalition led by Benjamin Netanyahu and 18 percent voted for the Arab parties.

In the 2026 election, 60 percent of voters in the regional council voted for the parties of the center-left coalition led by Gadi Eisenkot, while 25 percent voted for the Arab parties and 11 percent voted for the parties of the right-wing coalition led by Benjamin Netanyahu. An additional 2.3 percent voted for the Reservists, and 1.8 percent voted for Amcha Yisrael. Voter turnout increased 27 percent from the 2022 election.
