= Harashim =

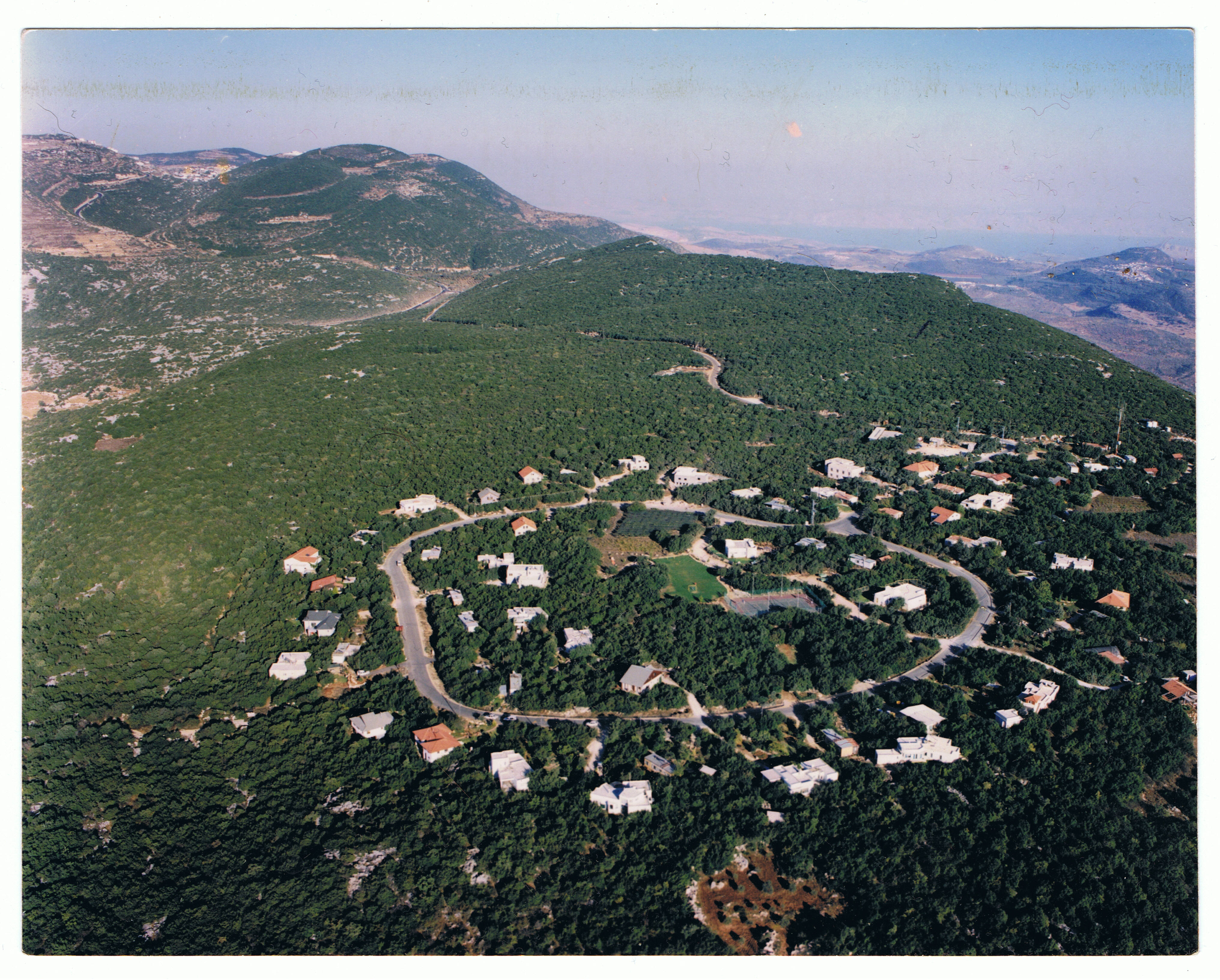

- Location within Northwest Israel
- Coordinates: 32°57′23″N 35°19′42″E
- Country: Israel
- District: Northern
- Subdistrict: Acre
- Council: Misgav
- Founded: 1980
- Population (2024): 323

Harashim (Hebrew: חֲרָשִׁים, lit. 'Craftsmen') is a community settlement in northern Israel. Located in the Upper Galilee to the north of Karmiel, it falls under the jurisdiction of Misgav Regional Council. In 2024 it had a population of 323. Its elevation is 830 m (2,723.10 ft). Harashim is the wettest inhabited place in Israel.

== History ==
The village was established in 1980 as part of the Galilee lookout plan to encourage Jewish settlement in the region. Its name is derived from nearby Tel Harashim, an Iron Age Jewish village where it is believed the inhabitants worked as blacksmiths.

== Geography ==
=== Climate ===
Harashim has a Mediterranean climate (Köppen climate classification: Csa) with hot, dry summers and cool, rainy and occasionally snowy winters. The village receives 986.8 mm (39 in) of precipitation per year. Summers are rainless and hot with an average high temperature of 29 °C (84 °F) and an average low temperature of 18 °C (64 °F). Winters are cool and wet, and precipitation is occasionally in the form of snow. Winters have an average high temperature of 12 °C (54 °F) and an average low temperature of 5 °C (41 °F). Harashim is the wettest inhabited place in Israel.

Climate data for Harashim (1991-2020 normals, 1952-2022 extremes)
Month	Jan	Feb	Mar	Apr	May	Jun	Jul	Aug	Sep	Oct	Nov	Dec	Year
Record high °C (°F)	22.0 (71.6)	24.4 (75.9)	32.0 (89.6)	34.1 (93.4)	36.0 (96.8)	37.9 (100.2)	40.0 (104.0)	41.1 (106.0)	39.5 (103.1)	35.0 (95.0)	29.5 (85.1)	24.0 (75.2)	41.1 (106.0)
Mean daily maximum °C (°F)	11.3 (52.3)	12.4 (54.3)	15.7 (60.3)	20.0 (68.0)	24.6 (76.3)	27.1 (80.8)	28.9 (84.0)	29.3 (84.7)	27.7 (81.9)	24.5 (76.1)	18.5 (65.3)	13.5 (56.3)	21.1 (70.0)
Daily mean °C (°F)	8.2 (46.8)	8.8 (47.8)	11.3 (52.3)	14.7 (58.5)	18.8 (65.8)	21.5 (70.7)	23.4 (74.1)	23.7 (74.7)	22.1 (71.8)	19.3 (66.7)	14.5 (58.1)	10.3 (50.5)	16.4 (61.5)
Mean daily minimum °C (°F)	5.0 (41.0)	5.1 (41.2)	6.9 (44.4)	9.5 (49.1)	13.0 (55.4)	16.0 (60.8)	18.0 (64.4)	18.2 (64.8)	16.4 (61.5)	14.1 (57.4)	10.4 (50.7)	7.2 (45.0)	11.6 (53.0)
Record low °C (°F)	−5.0 (23.0)	−5.0 (23.0)	−0.6 (30.9)	−2.2 (28.0)	3.5 (38.3)	8.6 (47.5)	12.2 (54.0)	12.6 (54.7)	11.0 (51.8)	4.6 (40.3)	−0.2 (31.6)	−2.8 (27.0)	−5.0 (23.0)
Average precipitation mm (inches)	267 (10.5)	189 (7.4)	106 (4.2)	47 (1.9)	17.4 (0.69)	1.7 (0.07)	0 (0)	0 (0)	4.7 (0.19)	33 (1.3)	107 (4.2)	214 (8.4)	986.8 (38.85)
Average precipitation days (≥ 0.1 mm)	12.5	10.3	8.0	4.3	2.1	0.5	0	0	0.7	3.4	6.0	10.5	58.3
Source: Israel Meteorological Service
