= Shorashim =

Community settlement in northern Israel

Shorashim: שָׁרָשִׁים (Hebrew)
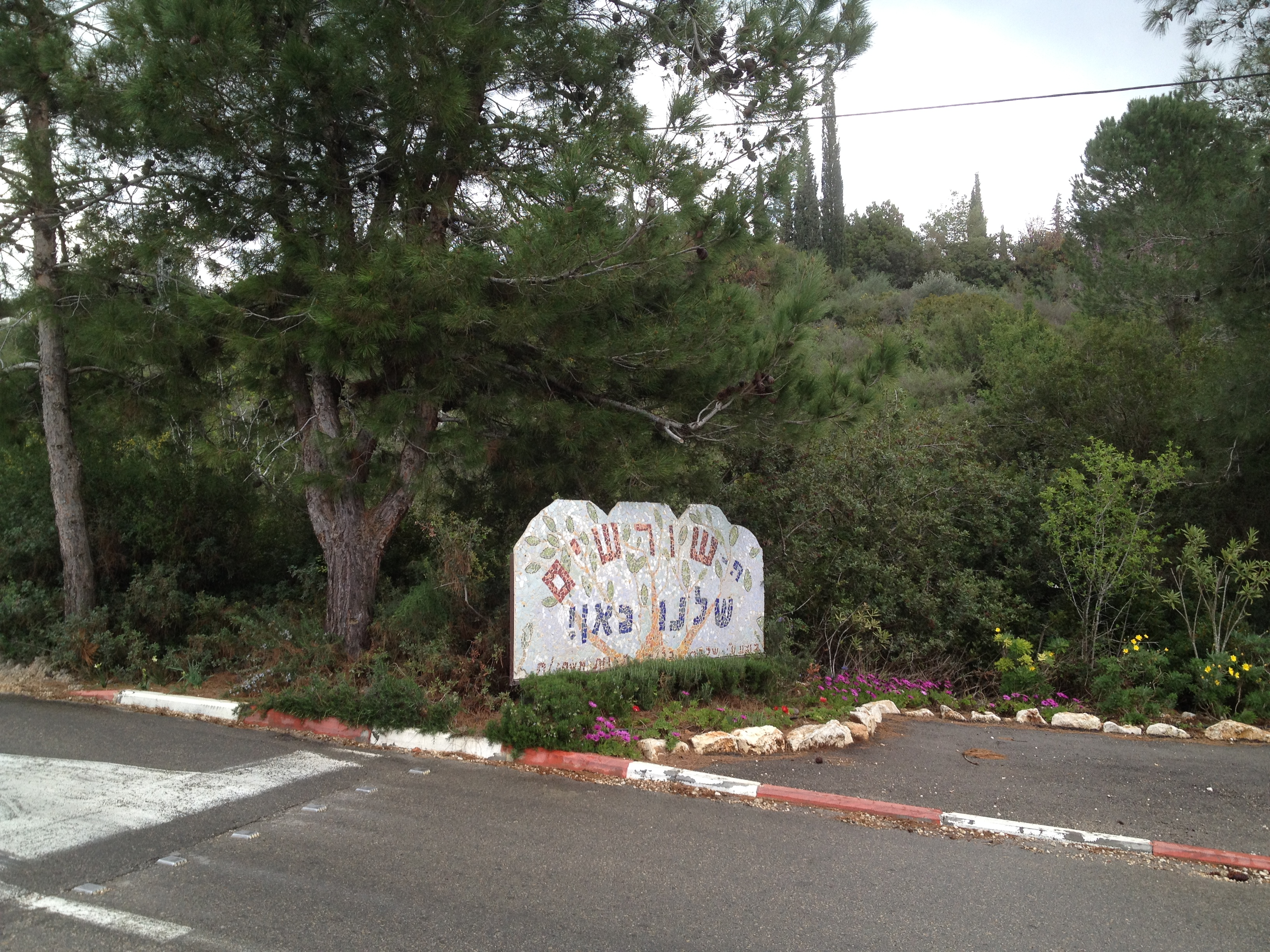

- Location within Northwest Israel Location within Israel
- Coordinates: 32°53′32″N 35°15′27″E
- Country: Israel
- District: Northern
- Subdistrict: Acre
- Council: Misgav
- Affiliation: Moshavim Movement
- Founded: 1985
- Founder: North American immigrants
- Population (2024): 622

Shorashim (Hebrew: שָׁרָשִׁים, שורשים, lit. Roots) is a community settlement in northern Israel. Located in the lower Galilee and affiliated with the Conservative movement, it falls under the jurisdiction of Misgav Regional Council. In 2024 its population was 622.

== History ==
Shorashim was established as a moshav in 1985 by a group of North American immigrants who had formed a gar'in in 1980. Over the years, it was privatized, but the community remains tightly knit and committed to a traditional but pluralistic way of life. All community activity is voluntary. About half of the residents are native Israeli and the rest new immigrants from various countries, predominantly English speakers.

== Foundation ==
The community was founded as an economic collective (MOSHAV SHITUFI) in 1980 by a group of immigrants (OLIM) from English-speaking countries and native-born Israelis. In 1992, the community privatized and today operates as a yishuv kehilati (cooperative community).

The community is home to more than 130 families.

== Community and religious life ==
As many of the founding residents are immigrants, they understand the immigrant experience. Some have no extended family in Israel, so neighbors are not only friends, but family and support system, celebrating life cycle events, Shabbat, and holidays together. For many native-born Israelis, Shorashim is the gathering place for relatives from around the country.

Committees of volunteers oversee nearly every aspect of community life from general administration to the nursery schools, holidays, library, and the synagogue. A number of community-wide social and cultural events throughout the year are coordinated by volunteers (for example, annual Yom Hazikaron/Yom Ha’atzma’ut activity, 1st grade-12th grade party).

Shorashim’s affiliation with the Masorti (Conservative) movement goes back to its founding. Religious services are led by the members of the community (volunteers!) every Friday evening, Shabbat morning, and all holidays. Services are egalitarian, with men and women participating fully in all aspects of synagogue ritual. On holidays, to complement religious services and study sessions, there are social and cultural activities ranging from communal potluck meals to parties.

== Education and youth ==
Nursery, preschool, and kindergarten for children ages three months to six years are located on Shorashim. There is a longer-day option too.

There are several elementary school options for children who live on Shorashim. The majority attend a government-operated school (“public”) in the Misgav Regional Council center; others attend the Arab-Jewish school (also a government school), an anthroposophic (Waldorf) school, or a government-run religious school. Shorashim’s high schoolers generally attend the award-winning Misgav Regional Community High School.

Transportation is provided to and from area elementary and secondary schools. Shorashim is about a seven-minute drive from the Misgav Regional Council center.

The Regional Council offers a range of afterschool activities (including sports, art, and music) for children in all grades. Regional Council buses shuttle the children to and from their activities throughout the afternoon and evening.

Children from 3rd grade through high school can participate in the local chapter of the Ihud Hahaklai youth movement, which is coordinated by the community’s youth director. They also participate in NOAM, the Masorti movement youth movement. The youth advisor is assisted by junior and senior counselors (high schoolers from Shorashim).

== Region ==
Shorashim is part of the Misgav Regional Council, which consists of 35 Jewish and Bedouin villages sprawling over approximately 5,000 acres of the Western Galilee. It sits on Route 784 in the hills of the Western Galilee, nearly equidistant between the Misgav Regional Council and Karmiel, a city of approximately 60,000. (A regional council is similar to a county.)

In addition to supporting the educational system and operating bus transportation, the Regional Council provides trash collection and other municipal services to Shorashim. The Regional Council center houses Council offices, schools (elementary through high school), health clinics, social services, parks, a community center, and a health/fitness club. Activities such as folk dancing, sports, lectures, and dance/choir/theater performances are available to all Misgav residents.

Clinics from two of Israel’s larger health funds, Clalit and Maccabi, are located at the Misgav Regional Council center. Services at the clinics include family doctors and some specialists, nurses, physical therapists, pharmacy, social services, and a dental office.

Government offices, banks, retail centers, supermarkets, restaurants, and larger medical clinics can all be found in Karmiel. The city’s cultural center sponsors professional theater, dance, cultural events, and performances by the Israeli Philharmonic. It also hosts an international dance festival each summer.

From Shorashim, it is a 15-minute drive to the center of Karmiel, about 25 minutes to Tefen, and about 45 minutes to Yokneam and Haifa. The nearest train station is located in Karmiel. There are direct trains to Tel Aviv (a 1.5 hour train ride) and other locations throughout Israel.

== Amenities ==
Shorashim has playgrounds, a basketball court, scenic hiking and walking trails, and landscaped pathways planted with indigenous trees such as olive and carob.

There are direct buses to Haifa, Tel Aviv, and Jerusalem from the main Karmiel-Misgav road that runs below Shorashim. Public transportation that comes into Shorashim itself is limited.
