= Hararit =

Hararit: הררית (Hebrew)
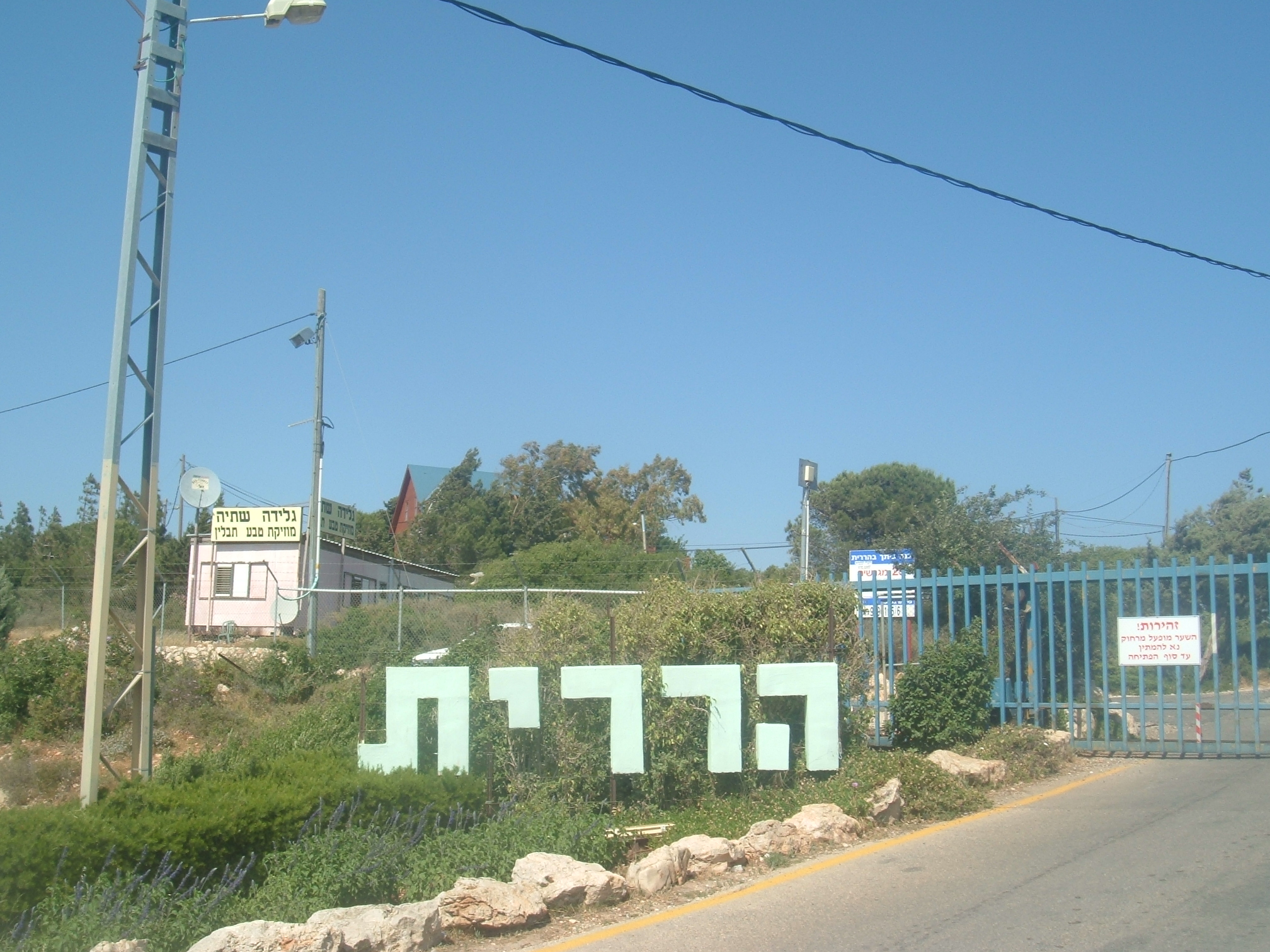
- Entrance to Hararit
- Etymology: mountainous
- Location within Northwest Israel Location within Israel
- Coordinates: 32°50′46″N 35°22′05″E
- Country: Israel
- District: Northern
- Subdistrict: Acre
- Council: Misgav
- Founded: 1980
- Founder: Shahaf Transcendental Meditation group
- Population (2024): 669

Hararit (Hebrew: הֲרָרִית; lit. "mountainous") is a community settlement in the Galilee, Israel. In 2024 it had a population of 669.

== History ==
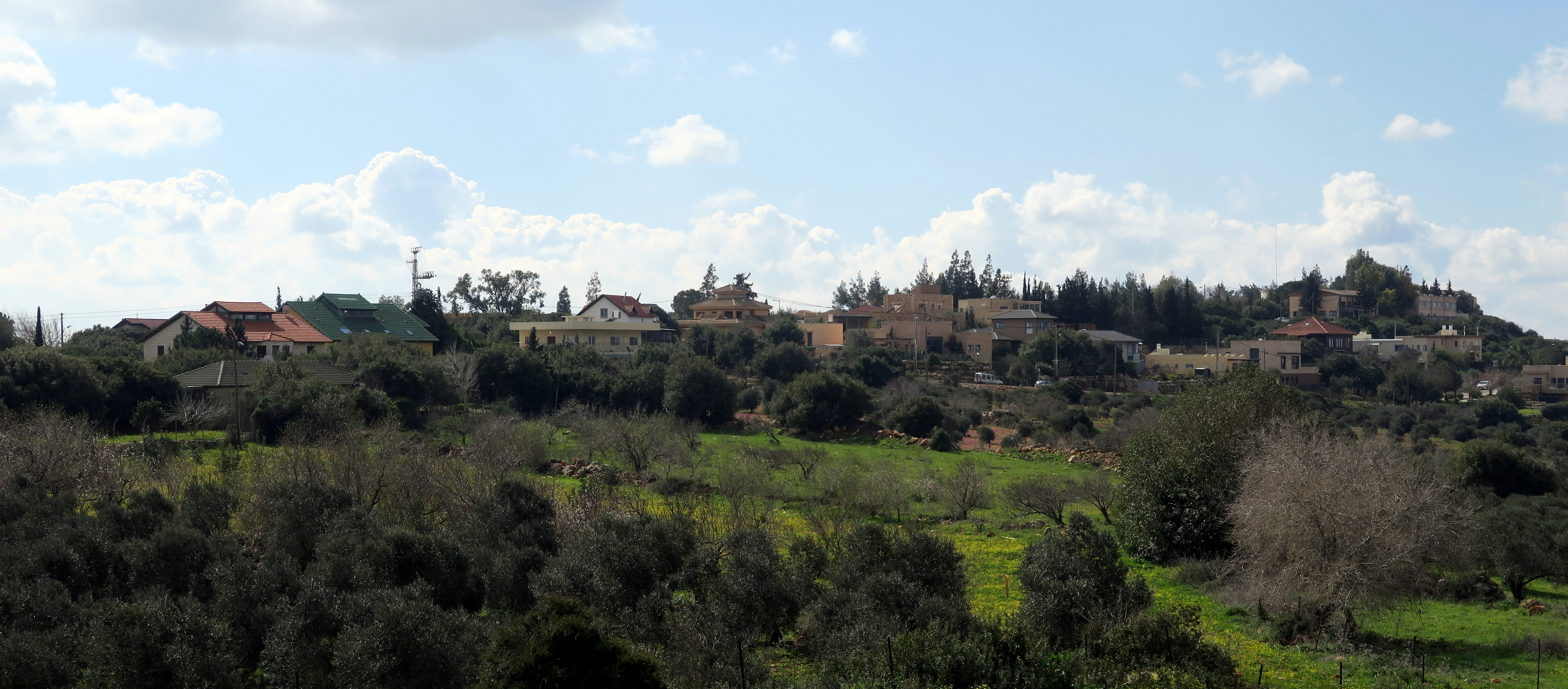
Hararit, view from northeast

Hararit is located on the crest of Mount Netofa in the Lower Galilee. It was established in 1980 as part of a government-sponsored project initiated by Labor party member Nissim Zvili. It was part of a plan to bring more Jewish residents to the Galilee area. Initially it was supposed to be settled by a group of Rafael employees, but they rejected it, as it was too far from their workplace, and eventually it was settled by Shahaf ("Seagull"), a group of people dedicated to the principles of Transcendental Meditation (TM). By the year 2000 the TM group was reported to be only half of its original population. In 2008, there were 95 families living in Hararit.

Archaeologists have discovered three large ancient water cisterns and the remains of agricultural terraces in the vicinity of Hararit.

== Economy ==
The economy is largely based on hitec, alternative medicine, tourism, with some of the residents operating bed and breakfast establishments.

== Notable residents ==
- Helen Doron
