= Sallama =

Sallama: סלאמה (Hebrew); سلامة (Arabic)
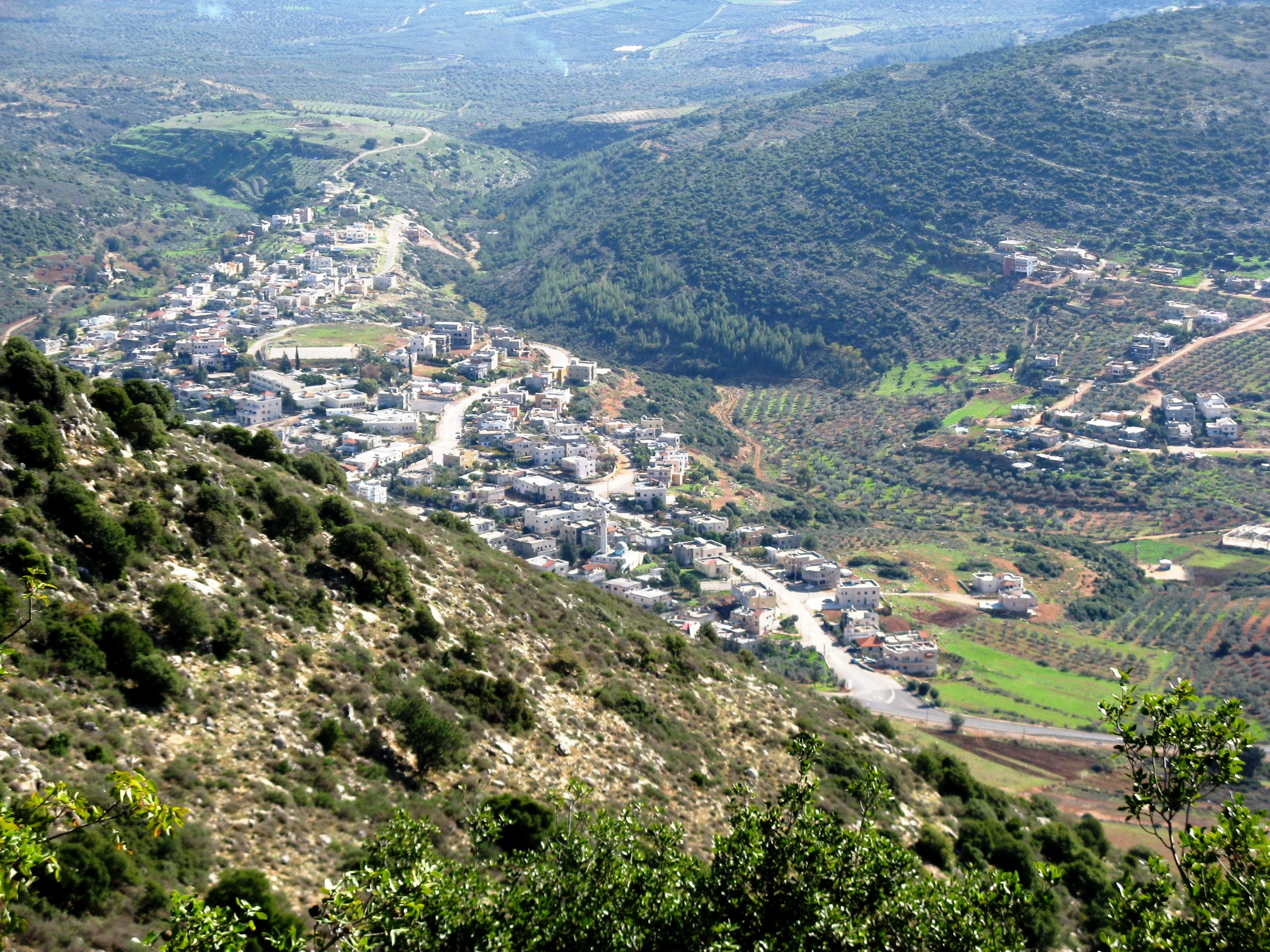

- Location within Northeast Israel Location within Israel
- Coordinates: 32°53′40″N 35°22′14″E
- Grid position: 185/254 PAL
- Country: Israel
- District: Northern
- Subdistrict: Acre
- Council: Misgav
- Population (2024): 3,878

Sallama (Arabic: سلامة; Hebrew: סלאמה) is a Bedouin village in northern Israel. Located in the Galilee near the Tzalmon Stream, it falls under the jurisdiction of Misgav Regional Council. In 2024 its population was 3,878. The village was recognized by the state in 1976.

== History ==
Sallama has been identified as the site of the village of Selamin (Salmon or Tselamon) in the Roman Province of Galilee.

At some point between 1688 and 1692, the Zayadina family, who not long before moved to the nearby village of Arraba, had assaulted and destroyed Sallama, whose Druze sheikh controlled the Shaghur subdistrict to which both villages belonged. The Druze subsequently fled Sallama and at least eight other villages in the subdistrict, including Kammaneh and Dallata. At least some of these Druze migrated to the Hauran to join their co-religionists. The Zayadina meanwhile began their influence in the Galilee and gained the tax farm of Shaghur.

In 1875, on the top of the site Guérin found the remains of a rectangular enclosure, 80 paces by 50. Within the enclosure and along the walls have been built twenty crude vaulted chambers, which appeared to him modern. Besides the cisterns and caves mentioned by Lieutenant Kitchener, Guerin observed two presses cut in the rock. In 1881, the PEF's Survey of Western Palestine noted the presence of "Heaps of stones, cisterns, and caves" in the village site.

== Voting Patterns ==
In the 2026 election, 93 percent of voters in Sallama voted for the Arab parties, while 4 percent voted for the parties of the center-left coalition led by Gadi Eisenkot and 1 percent voted for the parties of the right-wing coalition led by Benjamin Netanyahu. Among the voters for the Arab parties, 80 percent voted for Ra'am, while 20 percent voted for the Joint List. Voter turnout increased 66 percent from the 2022 election.

== See also ==
- Arab localities in Israel
- Bedouin in Israel

== Bibliography ==
- Conder, C.R.; Kitchener, H.H. (1881). The Survey of Western Palestine: Memoirs of the Topography, Orography, Hydrography, and Archaeology. Vol. 1. London: Committee of the Palestine Exploration Fund.
- Firro, Kais (1992). A History of the Druzes. Vol. 1. Brill. ISBN 90-04-09437-7.
- Guérin, V. (1880). Description Géographique Historique et Archéologique de la Palestine (in French). Vol. 3: Galilee, pt. 1. Paris: L'Imprimerie Nationale.
- Palmer, E.H. (1881). The Survey of Western Palestine: Arabic and English Name Lists Collected During the Survey by Lieutenants Conder and Kitchener, R. E. Transliterated and Explained by E.H. Palmer. Committee of the Palestine Exploration Fund.
- Tsafrir, Y.; Leah Di Segni; Judith Green (1994). (TIR): Tabula Imperii Romani: Judaea, Palaestina. Jerusalem: Israel Academy of Sciences and Humanities. ISBN 965-208-107-8.
