= Lavon, Israel =

Village in northern Israel

Lavon
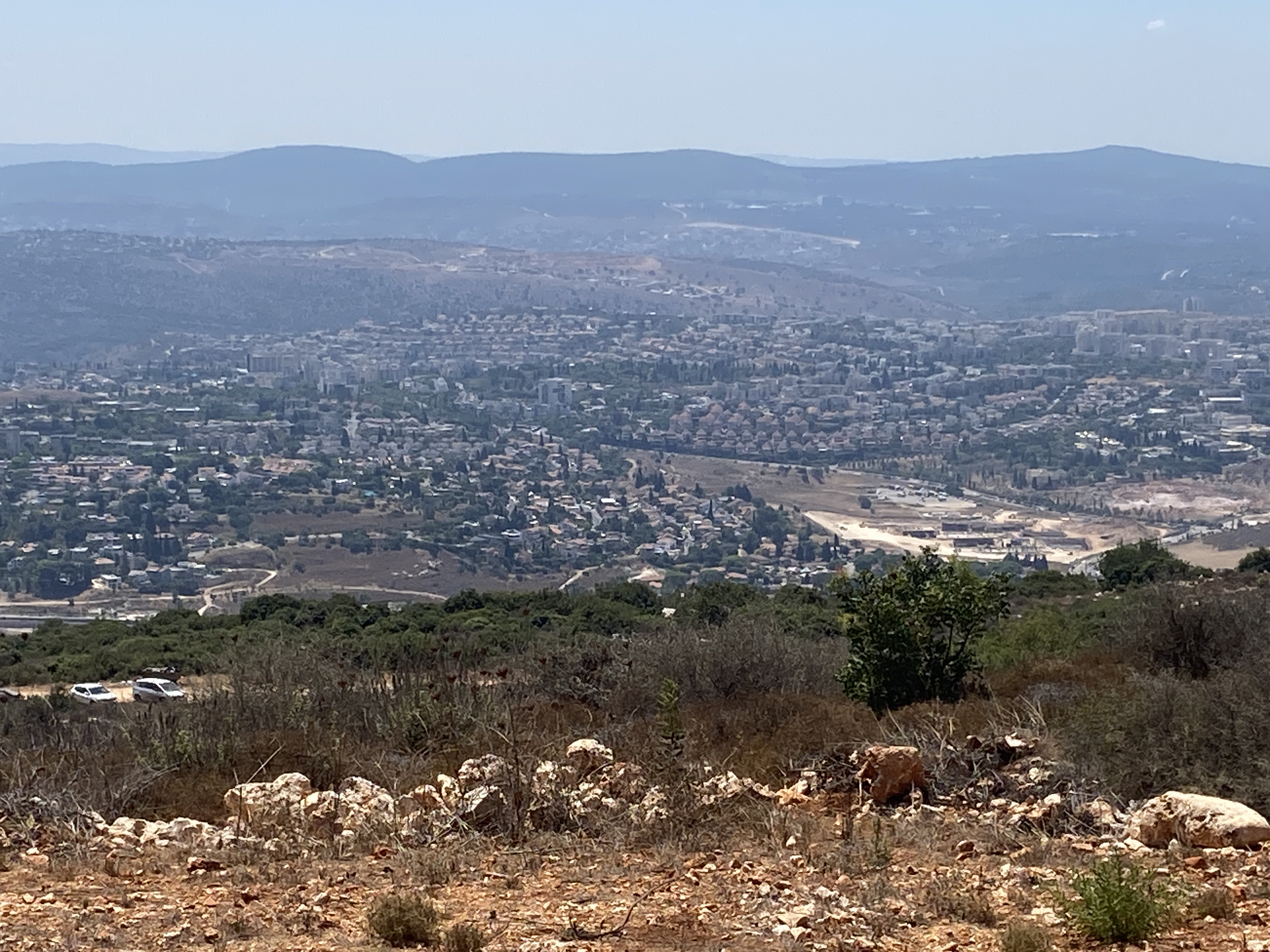

- Location within Northwest Israel
- Coordinates: 32°56′29″N 35°17′15″E
- Country: Israel
- District: Northern
- Subdistrict: Acre
- Council: Misgav
- Founded: 1980
- Population (2024): 883

Lavon (Hebrew: לָבוֹן) is a community settlement in northern Israel. Located in the Galilee four kilometres north of Karmiel, it falls under the jurisdiction of Misgav Regional Council. In 2024 it had a population of 883.

== History ==
The village was established in 1980 and was named after former Minister of Defence Pinchas Lavon.
