= Moreshet =

Community settlement in northern Israel

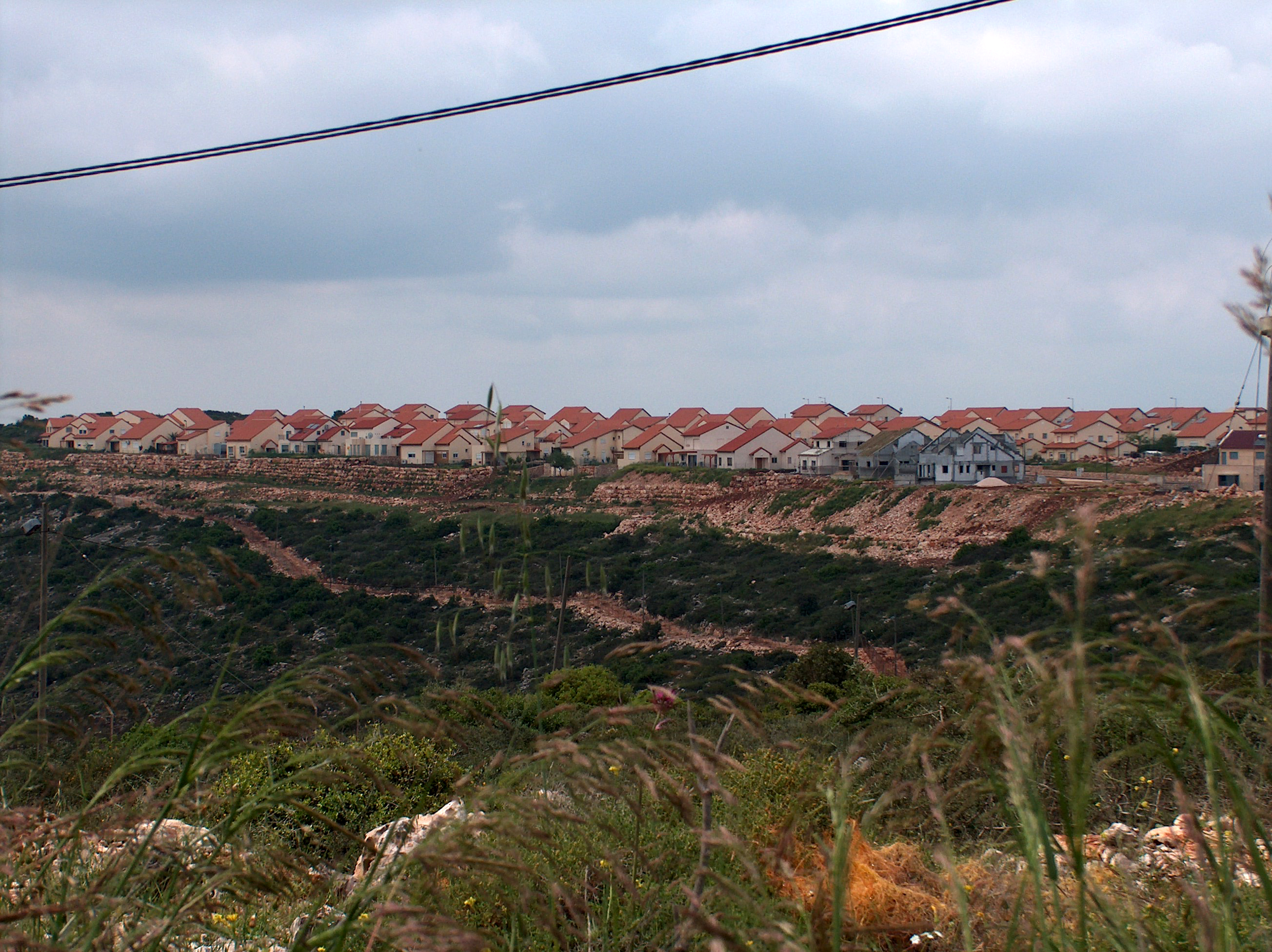

- Location within Northwest Israel
- Coordinates: 32°49′40″N 35°14′7″E
- Country: Israel
- District: Northern
- Subdistrict: Acre
- Council: Misgav
- Affiliation: Amana
- Founded: 1996
- Founder: Amana
- Population (2024): 1,610

Moreshet (Hebrew: מוֹרֶשֶׁת, lit. 'Heritage') is a community settlement in northern Israel whose members adhere to a religious Jewish identity. Located in the Lower Galilee between Karmiel and Shefa-'Amr, it falls under the jurisdiction of Misgav Regional Council. In 2024 it had a population of 1,610.

== History ==
The village was established in 1996 with support from the Amana movement.
