= Lotem =

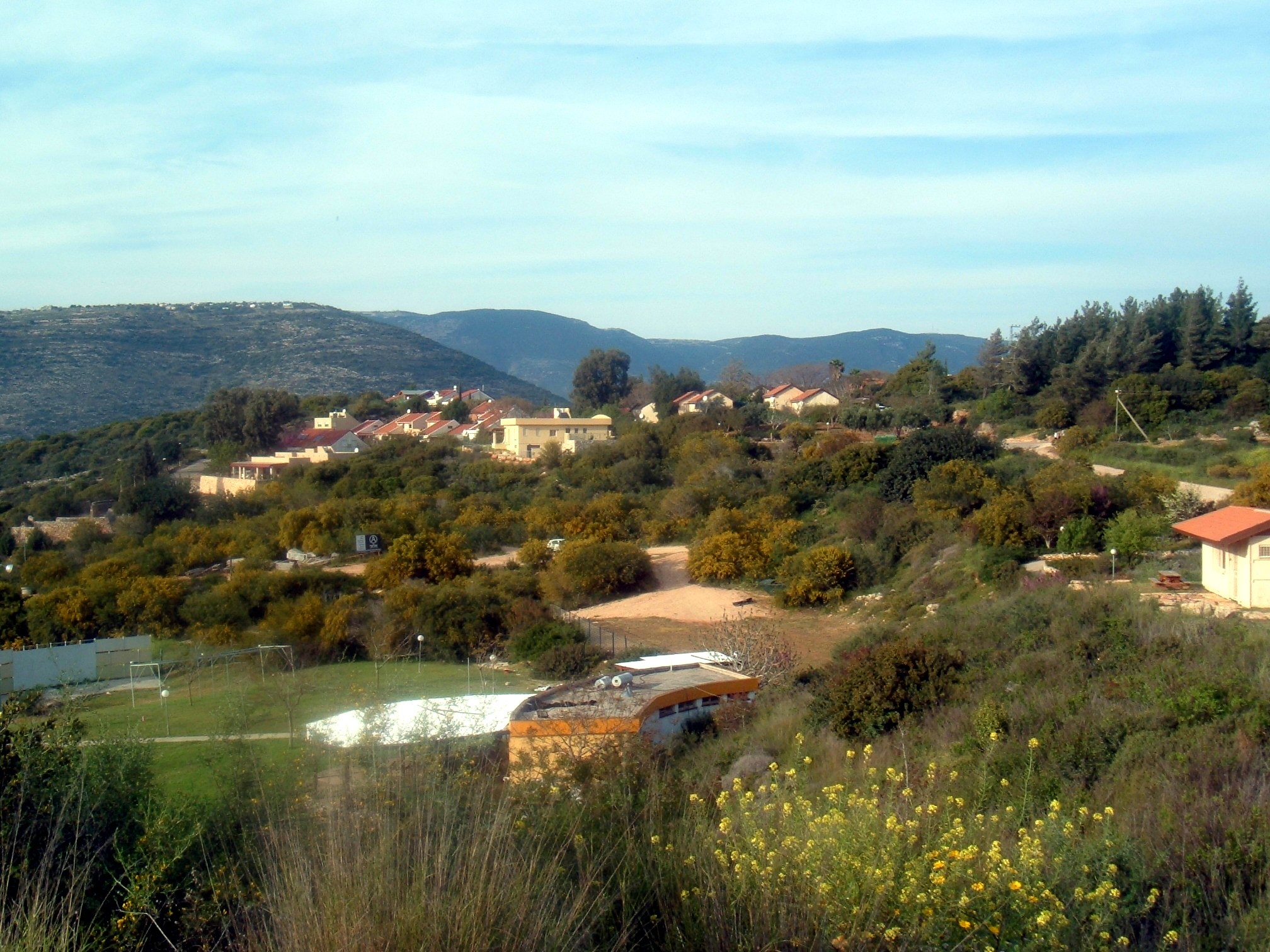
- View of Lotem

- Location within Northeast Israel
- Coordinates: 32°52′57″N 35°21′26″E
- Country: Israel
- District: Northern
- Subdistrict: Acre
- Council: Misgav
- Affiliation: Kibbutz Movement
- Founded: 1978
- Population (2024): 702

Lotem (Hebrew: לֹטֶם, לוטם, lit. Cistus) is a village in northern Israel divided into a part run as a kibbutz and a part run as a community settlement. Located in the Galilee, it falls under the jurisdiction of Misgav Regional Council. In 2024 it had a population of 702.

== History ==
The village was founded in 1978 as a kibbutz. In 1992 it became the first kibbutz to initiate a community expansion and today the village includes both the kibbutz and a community settlement.
