= Hussniyya =

Bedouin village in northern Israel

Hussniyya: חוסנייה (Hebrew); حسينية (Arabic)
- Location within Northwest Israel Location within Israel
- Coordinates: 32°54′2″N 35°19′21″E
- Country: Israel
- District: Northern
- Subdistrict: Acre
- Council: Misgav
- Population (2024): 992

Hussniyya (Arabic: حسينية; Hebrew: חוסנייה) is a Bedouin village in northern Israel. Located in the Galilee near Karmiel, it falls under the jurisdiction of Misgav Regional Council. In 2024 its population was 992.

== History ==
The village was recognized by the state in 1996. Its inhabitants belong to the Swaid tribe. The women of Hussniya offer guided tours of the area focusing on picking and cooking wild plants. Zahiya Swaid heads a group of women who attended a business development course and now earn a living from the age-old Bedouin tradition of foraging wild plants for food and medicinal purposes.

== See also ==
- Arab localities in Israel
- Bedouin in Israel
