= Tuval =

- Location within Northwest Israel
- Coordinates: 32°55′44″N 35°14′45″E
- Country: Israel
- District: Northern
- Subdistrict: Acre
- Council: Misgav
- Affiliation: Kibbutz Movement
- Founded: 1980
- Founder: Scouts and Habonim; Dror members
- Population (2024): 419
- Website: tuval.org.il

Tuval (Hebrew: תּוּבַל) is a kibbutz in northern Israel. Located in the Galilee near Karmiel, it falls under the jurisdiction of Misgav Regional Council. In 2024 it had a population of 419.

== History ==
The village was founded in 1980 by Scouts and Habonim Dror members from England and South Africa and was named after the biblical Tuval, a descendant of Cain (Genesis 4:22).

In 2000 a community neighborhood was set up within the boundaries of Tuval. Today Tuval is both a kibbutz and a community settlement.

== Notable people ==
- Robbie Gringras, theatre artist
