= Tzurit =

Village in northern Israel

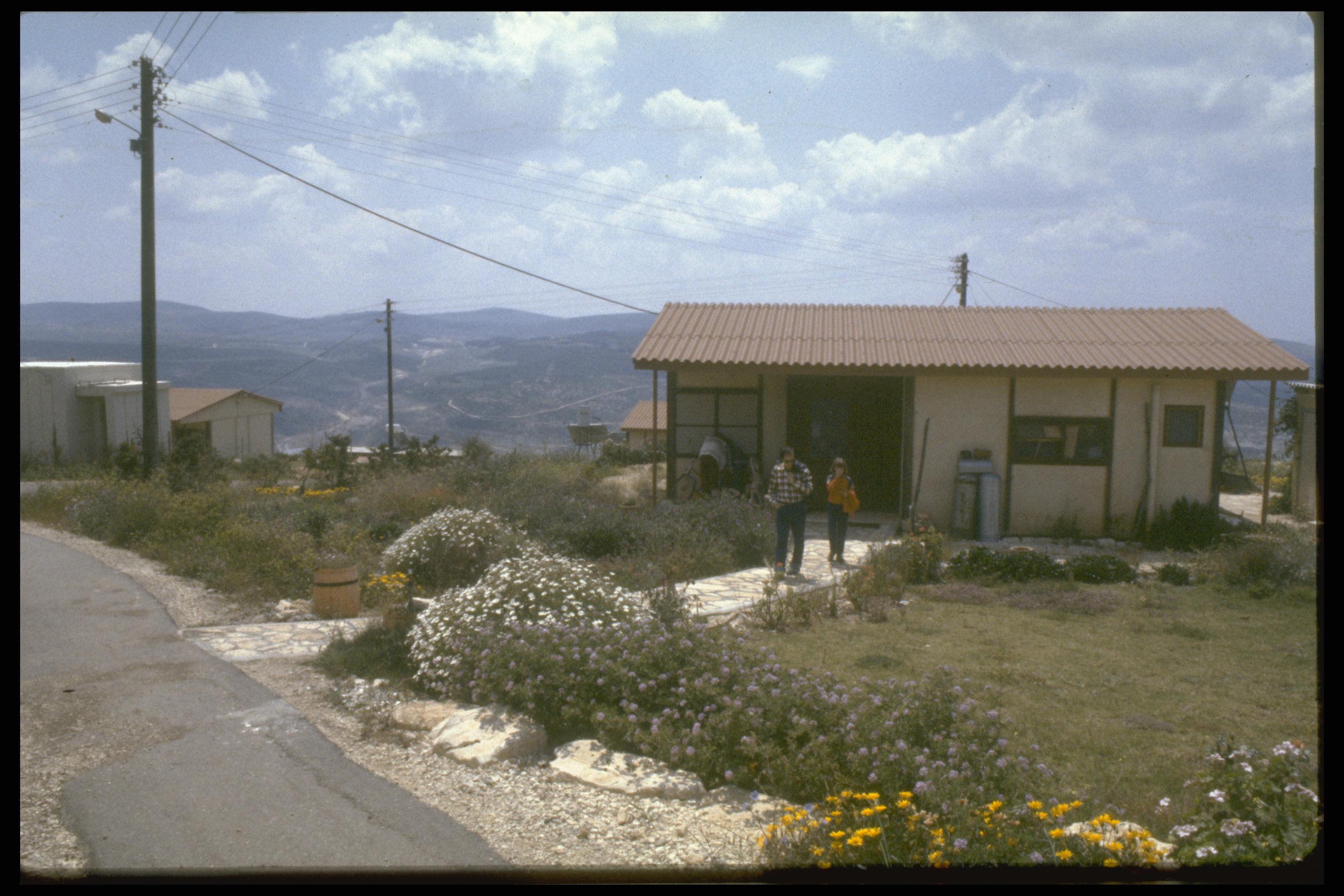
- Tzurit in 1984

- Location within Northwest Israel
- Coordinates: 32°54′7″N 35°15′2″E
- Country: Israel
- District: Northern
- Subdistrict: Acre
- Council: Misgav
- Affiliation: Mishkei Herut Beitar
- Founded: April 1981
- Population (2024): 877
- Website: www.zurit.co.il

Tzurit (Hebrew: צוּרִית) is a community settlement in northern Israel. Located in the western Galilee region, west of Karmiel, it falls under the jurisdiction of Misgav Regional Council. In 2024 it had a population of 877.

== History ==
The gar'in that founded Tzurit was formed in central Israel in 1979, with the village established by thirteen families in April 1981. The village is named the wildflower Sedum (Tzurit in Hebrew) that is found nearby.

== Notable residents ==
- Amir Gutfreund
