= Shekhanya =

Shekhanya: שְׁכַנְיָה (Hebrew)
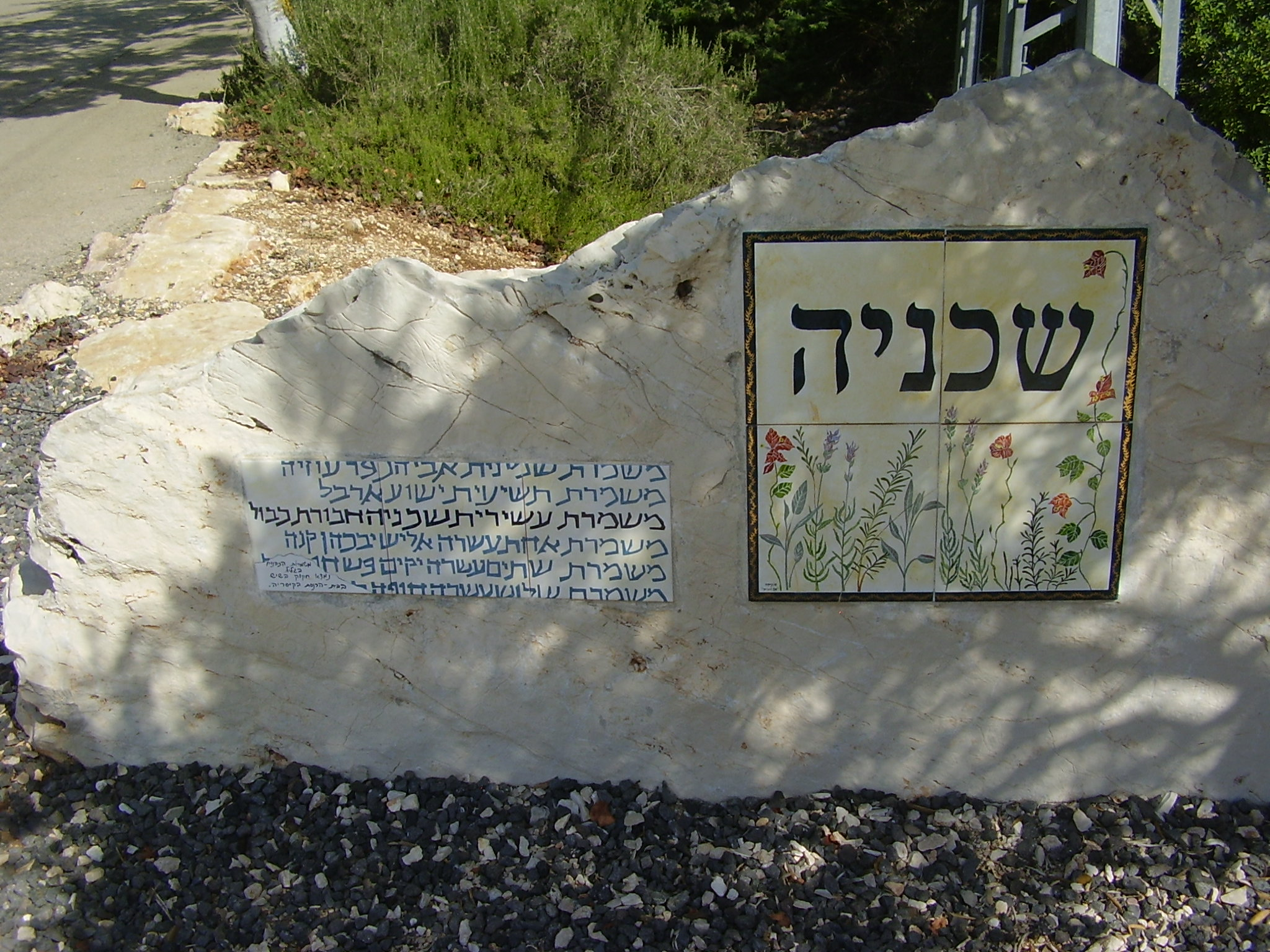

- Location within Northwest Israel Location within Israel
- Coordinates: 32°50′52″N 35°14′53″E
- Country: Israel
- District: Northern
- Subdistrict: Acre
- Council: Misgav
- Affiliation: Agricultural Union
- Founded: 1980
- Population (2024): 710
- Website: www.shekhanya.org.il

Shekhanya (Hebrew: שְׁכַנְיָה) is a community settlement in northern Israel. It is named after a priest family from the Bible (2 Chronicles 24:11). Located in the Galilee between Karmiel and Shefar'am, it falls under the jurisdiction of Misgav Regional Council. In 2024 it had a population of 710.

== Etymology ==
Shekhanya derives its name from the ancient Jewish priestly clan of the same name. This clan was one of the twenty-four priestly divisions and had its residence in the nearby settlement of Kabul.

== History ==
Shekhanya was established in 1980 as part of the Lookouts in the Galilee plan to increase Jewish settlement. The founders were a group of twelve Americans who had immigranted from Chicago, New York City and Baltimore in 1975 and aimed to create an industrial village.
