= Ras al-Ein =

Ras al-Ein: ראס אל-עין (Hebrew); رأس العين (Arabic)
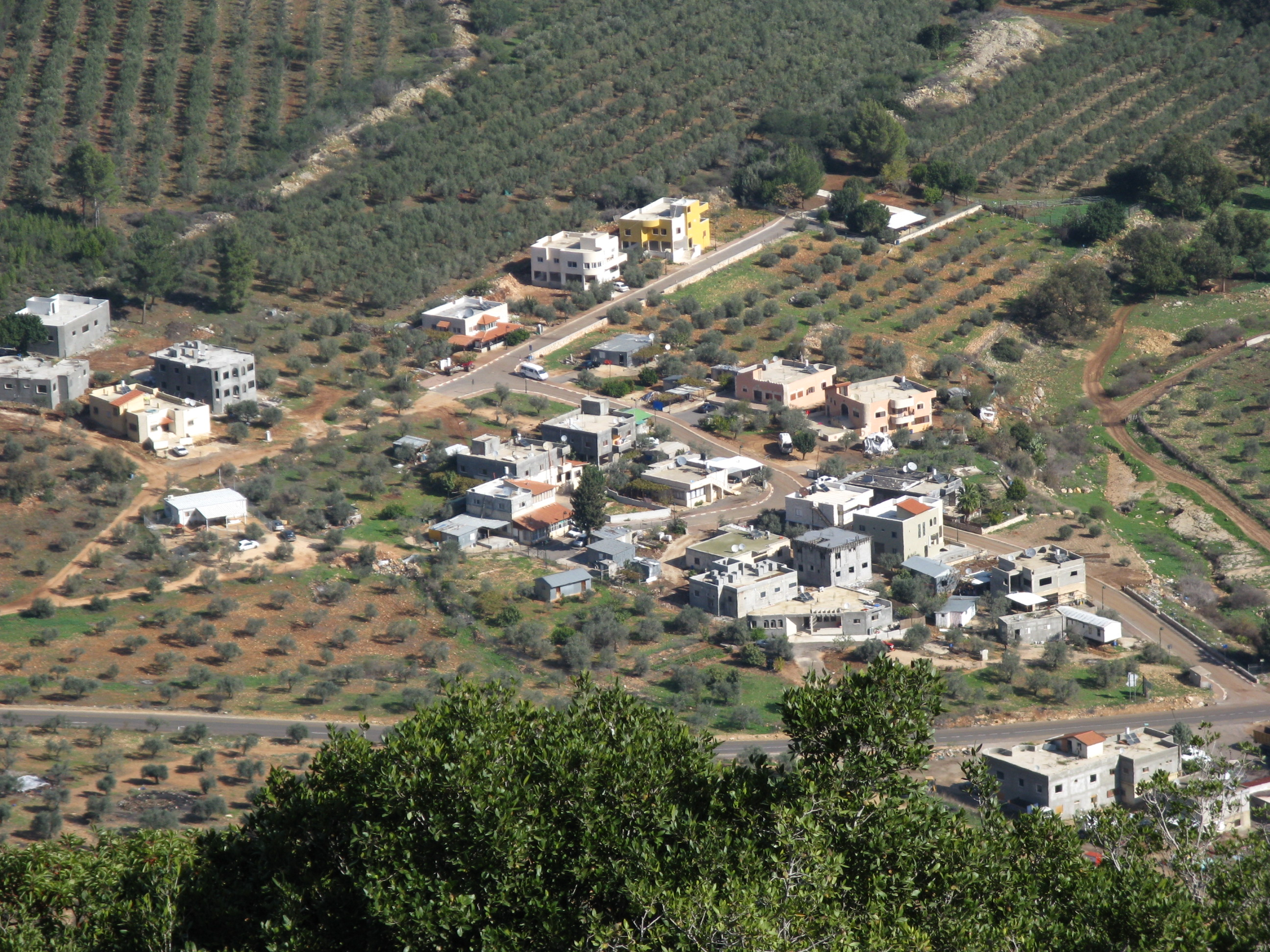
- Ras al-Ein

- Location within Northwest Israel Location within Israel
- Coordinates: 32°55′0″N 35°22′22″E
- Country: Israel
- District: Northern
- Subdistrict: Acre
- Council: Misgav
- Population (2024): 473

Ras al-Ein (Arabic: رأس العين; Hebrew: ראס אל-עין, lit. Head of the Spring) is a small village in northern Israel, located in the Galilee, near the Tzalmon Stream. It falls under the jurisdiction of Misgav Regional Council. In 2024 its population was 473.

== History ==
In 1991, there were 44 families living in the settlement. The village was recognized by the state in 1996. Half of its residents are members of the Suad Bedouin tribe and the other half are Christian Arab members of the Nicola family.

== See also ==
- Arab localities in Israel
