= Shezor =

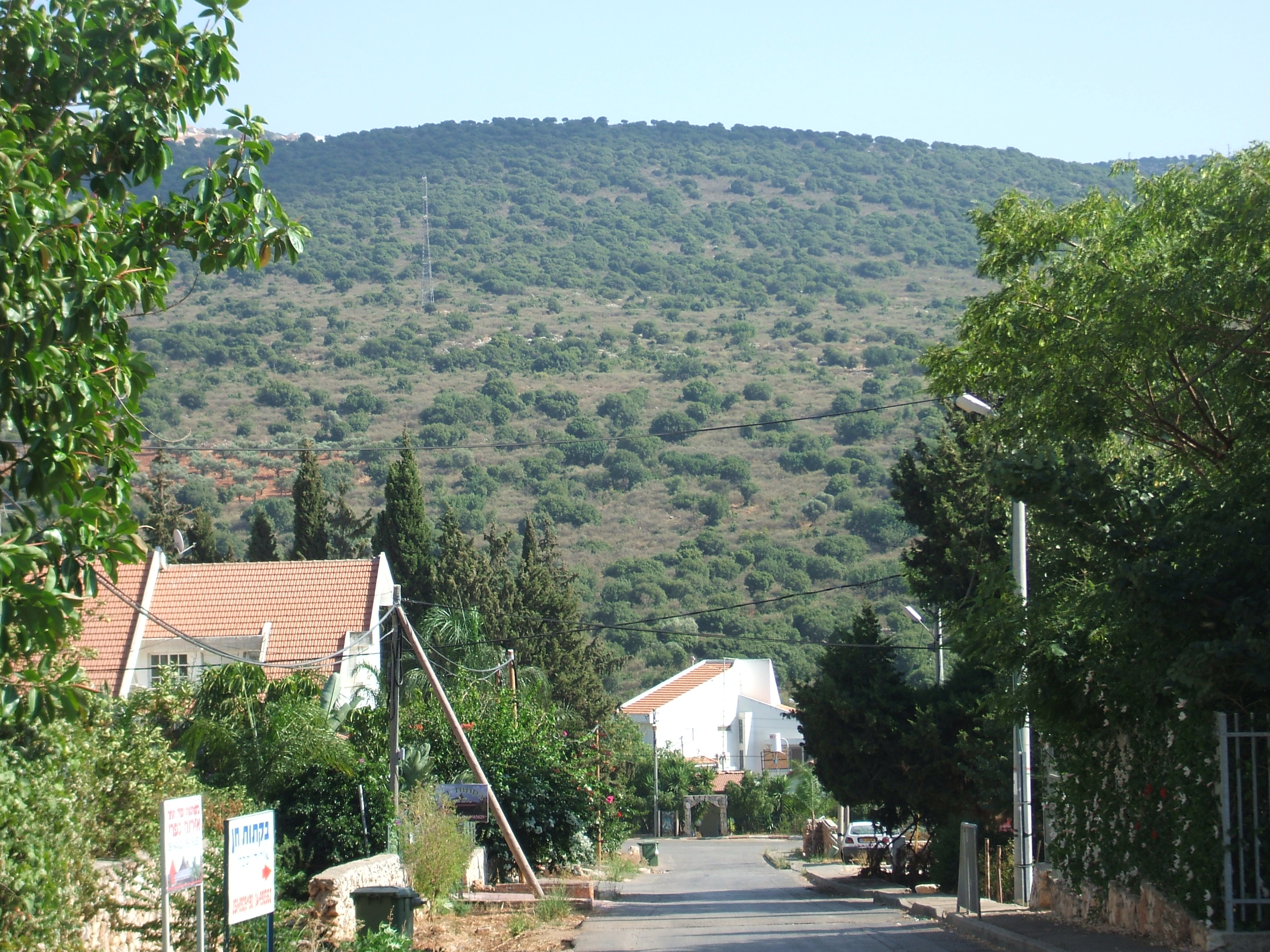

- Location within Northwest Israel
- Coordinates: 32°56′0″N 35°21′10″E
- Country: Israel
- District: Northern
- Subdistrict: Acre
- Council: Merom HaGalil
- Affiliation: Moshavim Movement
- Founded: 1953
- Founder: Nahal
- Population (2024): 375

Shezor (Hebrew: שְׁזוֹר) is a moshav in the Galilee in northern Israel. Located near the similarly named Arab village Sajur, it falls under the jurisdiction of Merom HaGalil Regional Council. In 2024 it had a population of 375.

== History ==
The community was founded as a Nahal planned community that was settled in 1953 by Jewish immigrants to Israel from Morocco. After most of the original settlers left the community, new immigrants arrived from Iraq and Iran.

The moshav is named for an ancient city named "Shezur" that apparently existed nearby. Shimon Shezuri presumably lived there, and according to local tradition he is buried in nearby Sajur.
