= Moran, Israel =

Moran
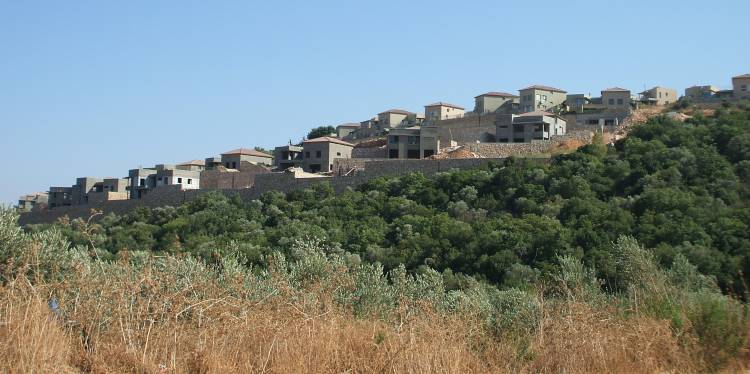

- Location within Northwest Israel
- Coordinates: 32°55′10″N 35°23′44″E
- Country: Israel
- District: Northern
- Subdistrict: Acre
- Council: Misgav
- Affiliation: Kibbutz Movement
- Founded: 1977
- Population (2024): 437

Moran (Hebrew: מוֹרָן, lit. 'Viburnum') is a kibbutz in northern Israel. Located in the Lower Galilee near Karmiel, it falls under the jurisdiction of Misgav Regional Council. In 2024 it had a population of 437.

== History ==
Moran was founded in 1977 by a kvutza of youths, most of whom had grown up in cities, and who had been training in kibbutz Ginosar. It was named for the viburnum plant that grows wild in the area.

The kibbutz runs a 28-room guesthouse.
