= Kamanneh =

Bedouin village in northern Israel

Kammaneh: כמאנה (Hebrew); الكمانه (Arabic)
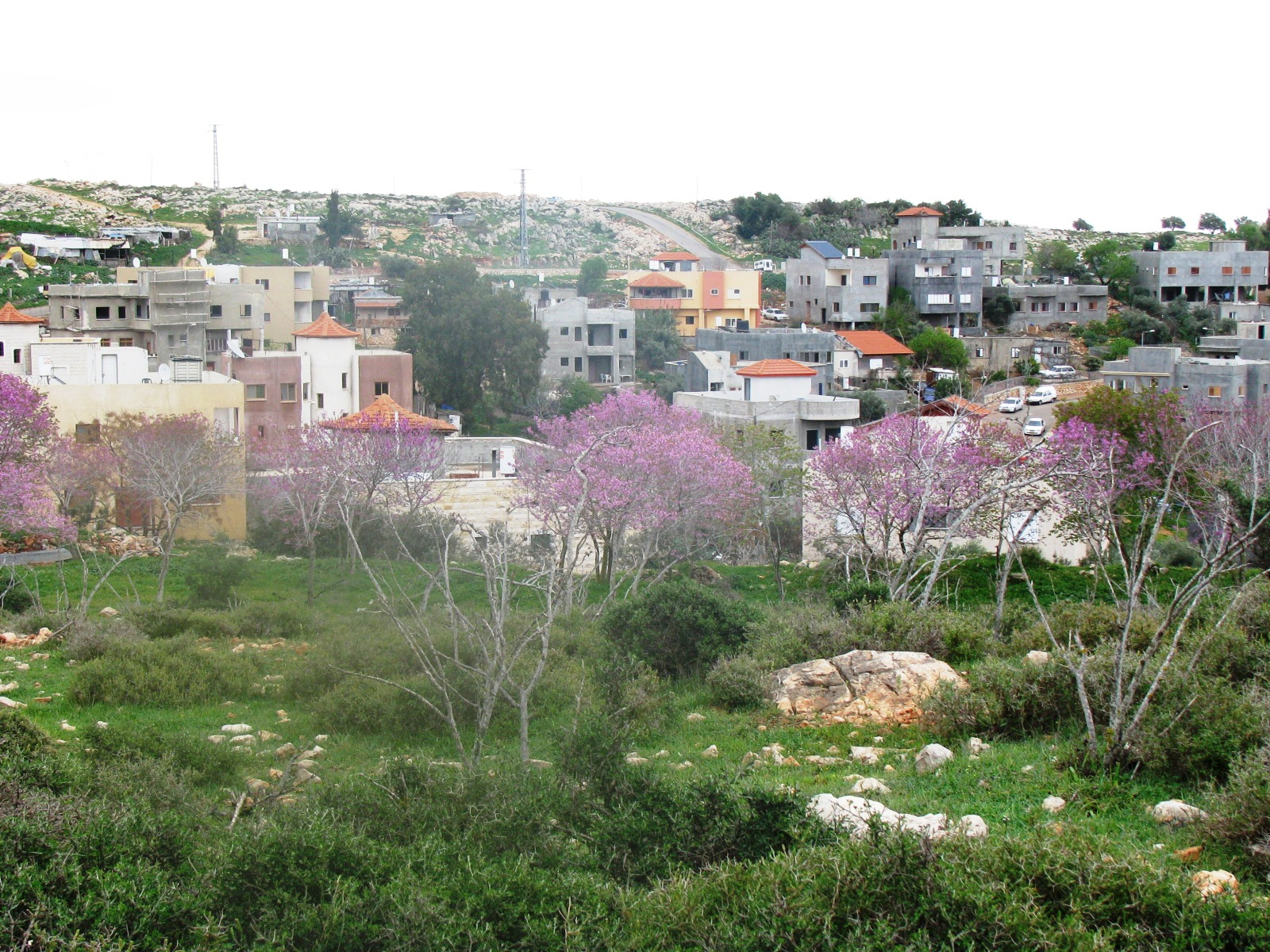
- West Kammaneh

- Location within Northwest Israel Location within Israel
- Coordinates: 32°54′40″N 35°20′19″E
- Country: Israel
- District: Northern
- Subdistrict: Acre
- Council: Misgav
- Founded: Early 19th century
- Founder: Negev Bedouin
- Population (2024): 1,635

Kammaneh (Arabic: الكمانه, Hebrew: כמאנה) is a Bedouin village in northern Israel. It is the result of the merger between Sawae'd (Kammaneh East) and Kamun (Kammaneh West). Located near Mount Kamun (Jabal Kamun) and to the north of Sakhnin, it falls under the jurisdiction of Misgav Regional Council. In 2024 it had a population of 1,635.

== History ==
=== Ottoman Empire ===
Kammaneh was founded in the early 19th century when Negev Bedouins began to establish permanent settlements in the Galilee. The Suweid tribe were one of the first Bedouin tribes to settle in the region found an area atop Mount Kamon (Jabal Kamun). They named it Kammana or "ambush". Like most Arabs in the Galilee, the Suweid tribe was depended on agriculture for survival.

=== Israel ===
In 1963, Israeli authorities declared Kammaneh or Area 9 as a military training zone endangering inhabitants by stray bullets or mortar rounds. Two years later the village was declared "unrecognized" by the Israeli Ministry of Interior as a part of the Planning and Construction Law.

In 1995 the Kammaneh was officially recognized by the government and was placed under the jurisdiction of Misgav Regional Council. The village consists of six neighborhoods.

In November 2008, the Clore Multi-Purpose Community Center was established in Kammaneh. The center offers daytime and after-school activities, a health clinic operated by the Clalit Health Fund and a well-baby clinic.

== See also ==
- Arab localities in Israel
- Bedouin in Israel
- Negev Bedouins
