= HaMerkaz HaHakla'i =

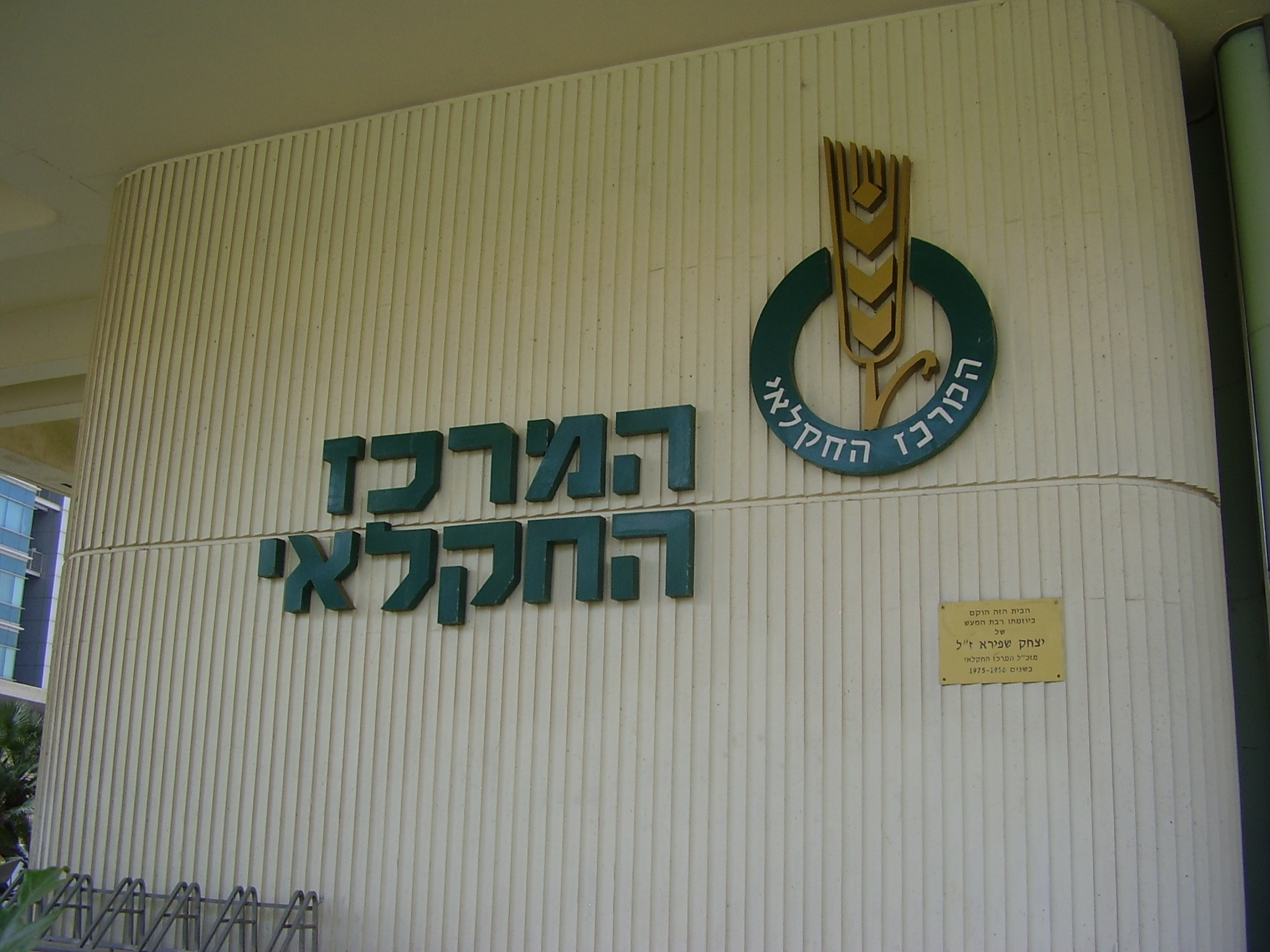
HaMerkaz HaHakla'i Building in Tel Aviv

HaMerkaz HaHakla'i (Hebrew: המרכז החקלאי, lit. 'The Agricultural Centre'), also referred to simply as Merkaz Hakla'i, is an umbrella organization covering the economic and social functioning of a large part of the agricultural settlements in Israel. It is the executive of the Agricultural Workers Union, which was established in 1919. In English it has been variously called the Central Agricultural Office, or the Agricultural Executive Centre, one of the "national frameworks set up prior to the founding of the State". It has been described as the main Jewish agricultural planning organisation of the British Mandate period, which connected the general workers' trade union (Histadrut) and the associated kibbutz movement, with the Zionist Organization (ZO). The Agricultural Centre played a major role in creating a centralised settlement and agricultural plan. It was in charge of coordinating Jewish agricultural activities by organising settlements into block committees and regional councils, allocating land, etc. After Arab residents of Palestine were expelled or fled during the 1948 war, the Agricultural Centre, directly or through its regional councils, distributed land to Jewish settlements (individual or in blocks) who were applying for such lease agreements.

== Organisation ==
The 151 members of HaMerkaz HaHakla'i are selected every four years by a conference of 501 members of the Agricultural Workers Union. The organisation is headed by a 21-member secretariat.

== History ==
The Agricultural Workers Union was established in 1919.

After the Histadrut was established in 1920, the Agricultural Workers Union became one of its central components. This arrangement lasted until 1994, when the two organisations separated.

== See also ==
- Agriculture in Israel
- Avraham Herzfeld, head of Merkaz Hakla'i for four decades
- Settlement movement in Israel
