= Gar'in =

Hebrew term for migrant groups

Gar'in (Hebrew: גרעין, lit. kernel) are groups of people who moved together to Ottoman Palestine, British Palestine, and since 1948, Israel.

Since the beginning of the 20th century, groups of people (usually circles of young friends) moved to Palestine/Israel together. The term "gar'in" originally referred to these groups who came from all across the world. Immigrating in a group provided the support necessary for survival. Many of these groups founded their own kibbutzim. The phenomenon of these groups has been ongoing since before Israel was established in 1948.
