= Israeli municipality merger of 2003 =

Merger of several Israeli Municipalities

The Israeli municipality merger of November 2003 was a merger of various select municipalities under the Israeli system of local governance.

== History ==
In 2003, Interior minister Avraham Poraz proposed a merger of over 200 municipalities. The plan was later reduced to between 60 and 70 municipalities. Ultimately, only 11 mergers took place. In 2008, two of the merged municipalities, Carmel City and Shaghur, were dissolved by the Knesset. A similar proposal to dissolve Baqa-Jatt failed, but was later approved in 2010.

The mergers were heavily criticized within the Arab and Druze sectors. The merger initially included a merger of five Druze councils, called City of Five, which included Abu Snan, Julis, Kafr Yasif, Yanuh-Jat and Yarka. The joint municipality elected a mayor in the 2003 municipal elections, but was dissolved by the Knesset after eight months in 2004.

== List of merged municipalities ==
- Baqa-Jatt (merger of Jat and Baqa al-Gharbiyye)
- Binyamina-Giv'at Ada (Binyamina and Giv'at Ada)
- Carmel City (Daliyat al-Karmel and Isfiya)
- Kokhav Ya'ir (Kokhav Ya'ir and Tzur Yigal)
- Modi'in-Maccabim-Re'ut (Modi'in and Maccabim-Re'ut)
- Shaghur (Majd al-Krum, Deir al-Asad and Bi'ina)
- Kadima-Tzoran (Kadima and Tzoran)
- Yehud-Monosson (Neve Monosson and Yehud)
