= Mary Silberman =

Israeli wheelchair basketball player for Alabama

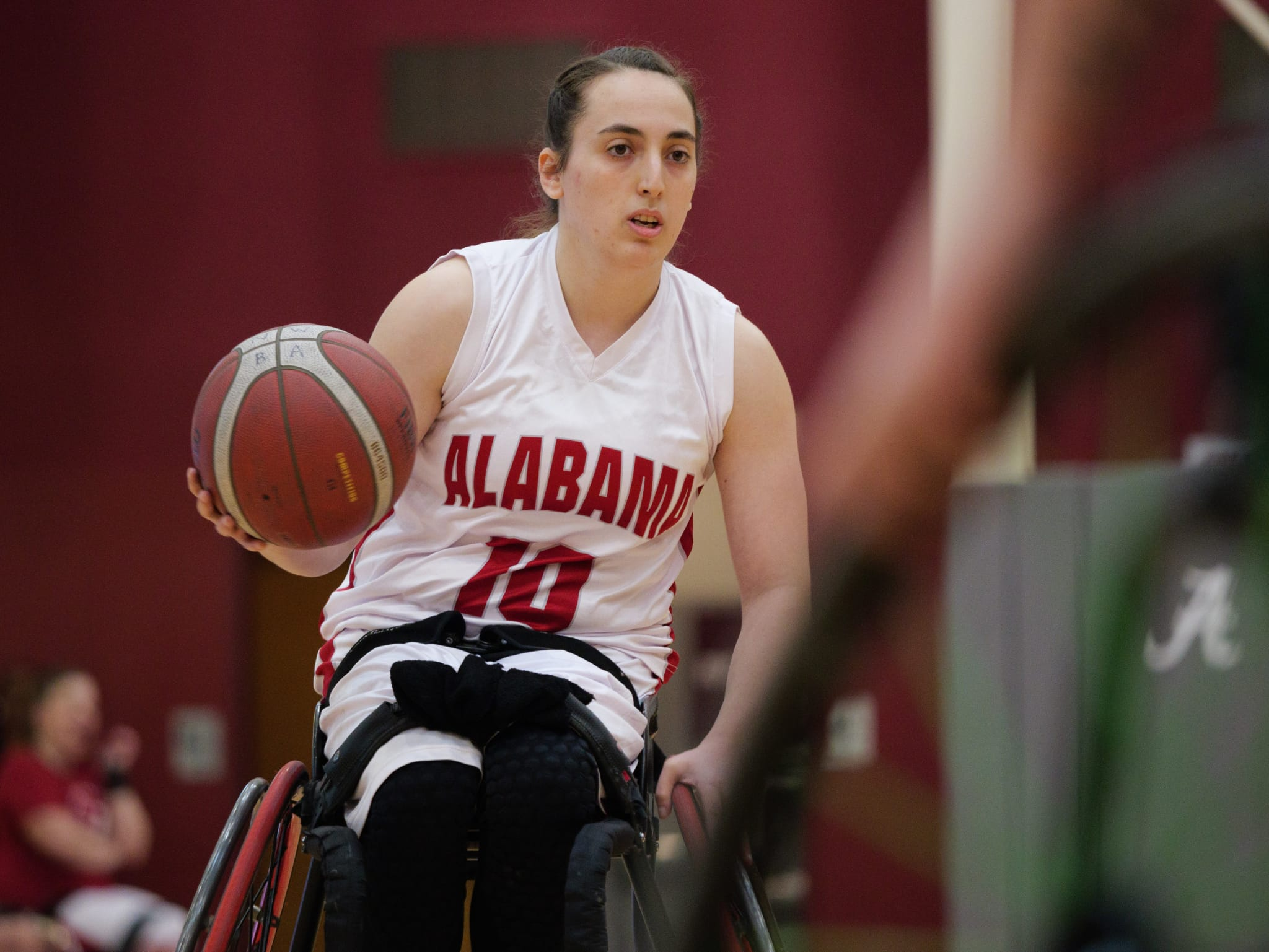

Personal information
- Native name: מרי סילברמן
- Full name: Mary Silberman
- Nationality: Israeli
- Born: July 15, 1997 (age 28)
- Years active: 2019–present

Sport
- Sport: Wheelchair basketball
- Disability class: 4.5
- University team: University of Alabama (2021– 2025)
- Team: RSV Bayreuth (2025 - Present); Majd al-Krum (2020 – 2023); Ilan Haifa (2019)

Mary Silberman (Hebrew: מרי סילברמן; born July 15, 1997) is a 4.5 point Israeli wheelchair basketball player who plays for RSV Bayreuth in Germany. She is a former MVP and a 4x Champion with the University of Alabama.

== Biography ==
Mary was born in Even Yehuda, Israel. At the age of 8, she moved with her parents, two older brothers and her twin to She'ar Yashuv, Israel. There, she began to play able-body basketball until her injury at the age of 18.

Mary got injured during a play in the woman's 2nd division as the leading Point guard for Hapoel Gilboa Keren. She suffered a severed knee injury that required two major and complicated surgeries that effectively ended her able-bodied basketball career.

After a long rehab for three years, she turned her attention into wheelchair basketball. She is classified as a 4-point player.

== Career ==
=== Early days (able-body) ===
During her short career as an able-body player, she played for the U16 Israeli National Team and the Woman's 3rd and 2nd divisions.

She led her high-school team to the Girl's National Championship.

=== 2018 - 2019 ===
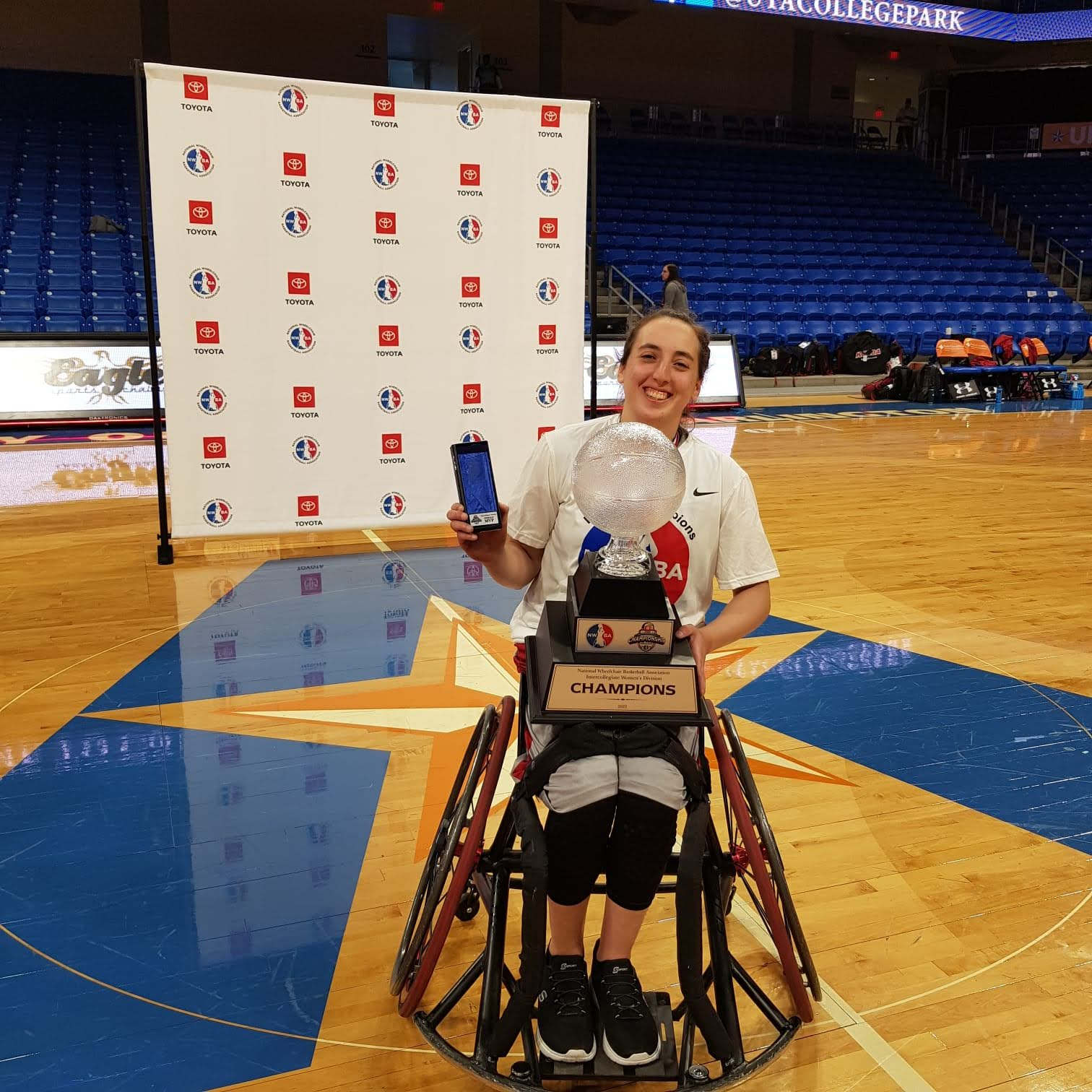
Mary Silberman with the 2021–2022 championship trophy and the 2022 Intercollegiate Finals MVP award

Silberman started playing Wheelchair basketball with Ilan Haifa at the Israeli all men league. She played under the coach Eran Levite.

During her first season with Levite, she won both the National Championship and the Israeli Cup under the 3rd division.

=== 2020 - 2021 ===
After the lockdown year of 2020, Silberman turned her attentions into the NWBA intercollegiate division. She moved to Tuscaloosa, Alabama to play for the Alabama Crimson Tide under coach Ryan Hynes on full scholarship. As a freshman, she helped the Tide win the championship coming off the bench

After the intercollegiate season, she came back to Israel to play for Eran Levite and won her 2nd double at the Israeli 3rd division, this time with the men's Majd al-Krum team.

=== 2021 - 2022 ===
At the beginning of the 2021–2022 season, Silberman was promoted to the starting five, leading Alabama to the number 1 seed going into the 2022 national championship.

The Tide were facing Illinois for the national championship, and they won 50–48 with a buzzer beater from Lindsey Zurbrugg. Mary scored 24 points, 53% shooting, 11 Reb in 40min of play. She claimed the 2022 Finals MVP

That season, as the previous one, she won her 3rd double with Eran Levite in the Israeli league. Again with Majd al-Krum team. This time, it was in the Israeli 2nd division.

=== 2022 - 2023 ===
With the Tide, Silberman led the team to an 18–0 in the conference play. She won the 2022–2023 player of the year award. They were the number 1 seed going into the 2023 nationals finals. After beating Arizona 78–34 in the semi-finals, they won against UTA 88–41 in the finals, claiming her 3rd WNBA championship.

2023 - 2024

During the 2023–2024 season, Silberman had another terrific season as the tide ended the season with the record of 25–0. Going to the national they were the number 1 seed again. In the semi-finals, they played Arizona. Silberman had 12 assists and 7 rebounds to help the team win 65–35. In the finals, they played UTA. Silberman had 19 Points, 6 Assists, 6 Rebounds, 2 Blocks and 8/11 from the field. 2 mins to go in regulation, she got her 5th foul, receiving a standing ovation from the crowd. They won 75–57, claiming her 4th title in 4 years.

After the game, she won the 2024 Finals MVP award.

=== 2024 - 2025 ===
In her final season as Intercollegiate player, Silberman helped the team win their 5th title in 5 years. She received an Academic All American award, while performing on and off the field.

== Awards and achievements ==
=== NWBA intercollegiate ===
- 4× Champion (2021, 2022, 2023, 2024, 2025)
- 1× MVP (2023)
- 2× Finals MVP (2022, 2024)
- 1× 1st team All American (2023)
- 1× 2st team All American (2022)
- 4× Academic All American (2022, 2023, 2024, 2025)

Israeli Wheelchair Basketball National Association

- 2× 3rd Division National League Champion (2019, 2021)
- 2× 3rd Division Cup Champion (2019, 2021)
- 1× 2nd Division National League Champion (2022)
- 1× 2nd Division Cup Champion (2022)
