= Bi'ina =

Bi'ina: בענה; بعنة
- Local council
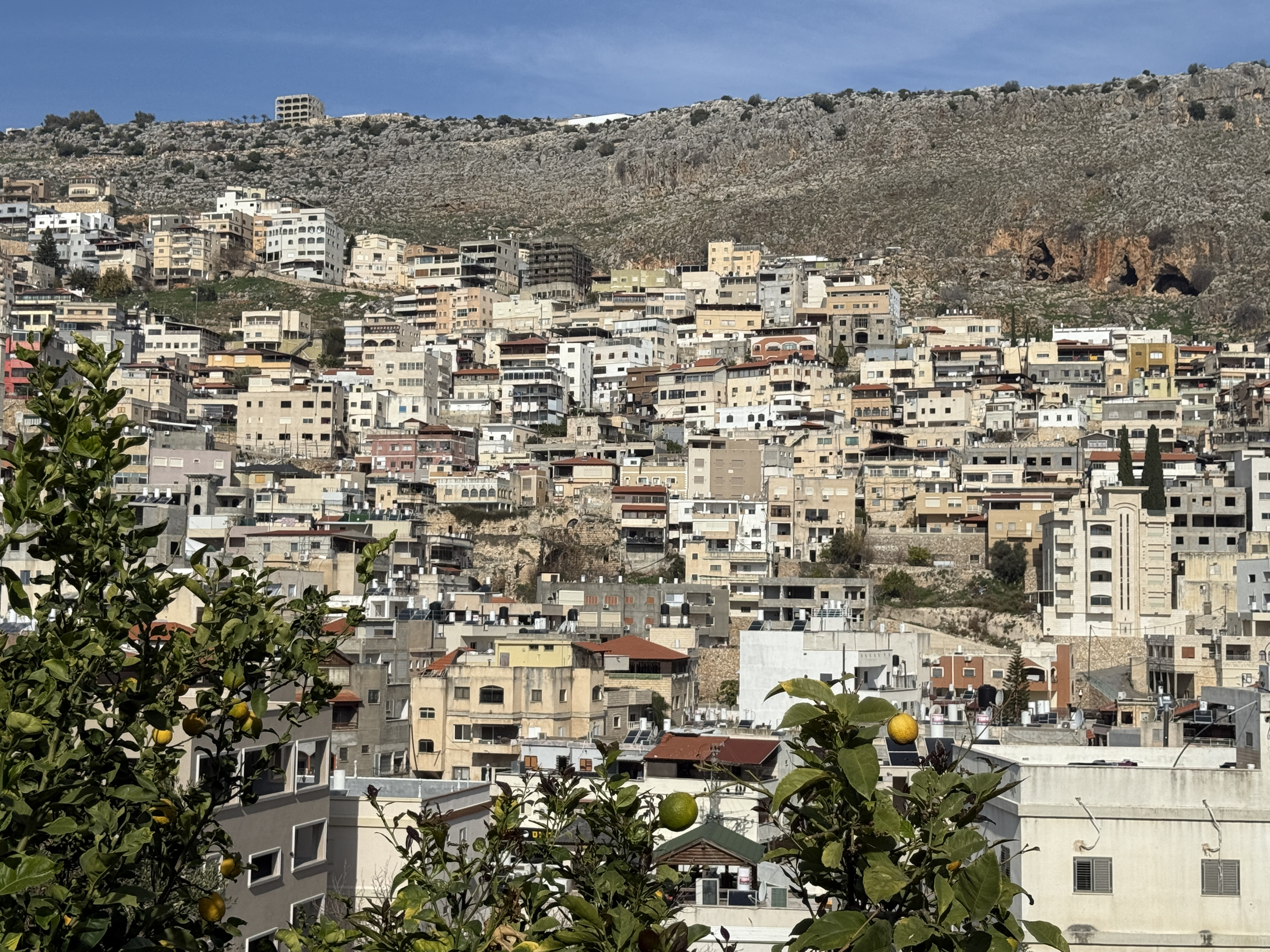
- The villages of Bi'ina (below) and Deir al-Asad (above), 2025. There is no clear dividing line between the two villages.

- Location within Northwest Israel Location within Israel
- Coordinates: 32°55′46″N 35°16′22″E
- Grid position: 175/259 PAL
- Country: Israel
- District: Northern
- Subdistrict: Acre
- Natural Region: Karmi'el

Population (2024)
  - Total: 8,714

Bi'ina (alternatively transliterated as al-Bi'neh, al-Ba'ina, al-Ba'ana and el-Baneh) (Note: The name of the village is derived from a personal name, according to Edward Henry Palmer.) (Arabic: البعنة) is an Arab town in the Northern District of Israel. It is located east of Acre. In 2003, Bi'ina merged with Majd al-Krum and Deir al-Asad to form the city of Shaghur, but was reinstated as a local council in 2008 after Shaghur was dissolved. Bi'ina has a mostly Muslim population (92%) with a Christian minority (8%); in 2024 its population was 8,714. In 2022, 92.6% of the population was Muslim and 7.4% was Christian. During the Crusader period, the area was a fief known as 'St. George de la Beyne'.

== Geography ==
Bi'ina is built on a round hilltop on the north side of the Beit HaKerem Valley (al-Shaghur in Arabic), from which it is separated by a saddle. Adjoining Bi'ina, on the slopes immediately north of the village, is the twin village of Deir al-Asad. Both villages were historically served by the same spring, which separated the villages.

== History ==
=== Classical antiquity ===
Along with several other sites, Bi'ina was proposed as the location of ancient Beth-Anath mentioned in Egyptian and biblical texts. (Note: Those who dispute Albright's identification are Charles William Meredith van de Velde and Victor Guérin, who place the ancient site of Beth-anath in Ain Aata, Lebanon. Others place the ancient site in Bu'eine Nujeidat, while still others thought that Beth-anath ought to be identified with Safad el Batih in Lebanon. Klein thought that Beth-anath was to be identified with Hinah. Zvi Gal, in his article, "The Late Bronze Age in Galilee: A Reassessment," Bulletin of the American Schools of Oriental Research, No. 272 (Nov., 1988), pp. 79-84 writes: "Various sites have been suggested for this city: Bi'ina in the Beit Hakerem Valley, (Albright 1923: 19-20; Safrai & Safrai 1976), Ba'inah in the Beit Netophah Valley (Alt 1946: 55-57), Tel Roš (Amiran 1953: 125-26), and Tell el Ḥirbeh (Garstang 1931:244-45).") Archaeological evidence suggests that Bi'ina, though perhaps occupied in the Early Bronze Age, was no longer occupied in the Late Bronze Age.

The old site of Bi'ina is thought to have been at the mound of Jelamet el-Bi'ina, less than a mile southeast of the present site of Bi'ina. The word jélameh, meaning "hill, mound," is sometimes employed instead of tell.

=== Crusader, Ayyubid and Mamluk periods ===
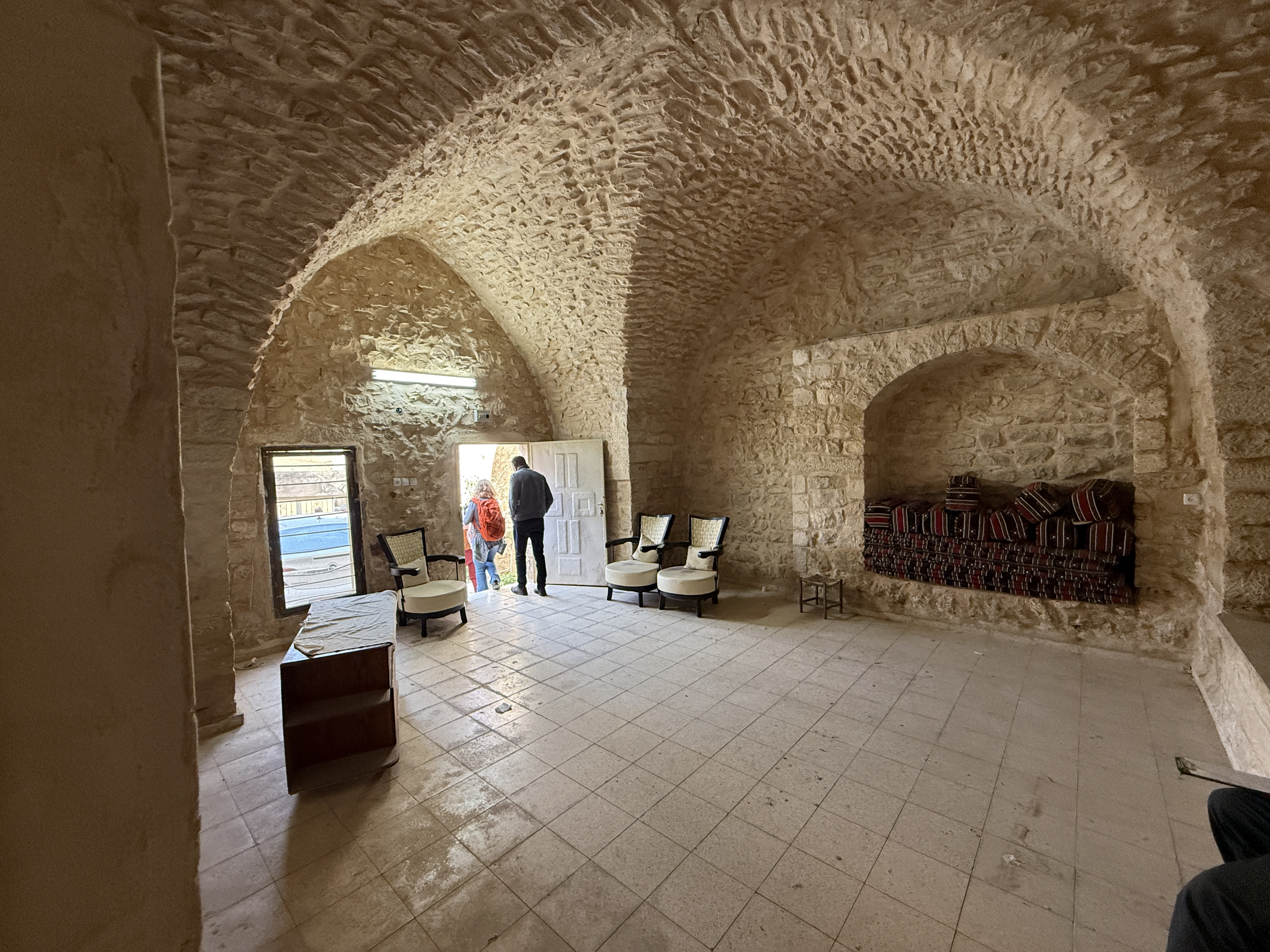
The interior of the village's old olive oil press, 2025

During the Crusader period (12th–13th centuries), the area around modern Bi'ina was a fief known as 'St. George de la Beyne' (Saint Jorge Labane). According to the historian Joshua Prawer, the Latin name la Beyne derived from the village's Arabic name al-Ba'ina, while 'St. George', in this case, was likely a corruption of the Arabic word sajara (lit. 'grove'). The site spanning the old cores of Bi'ina and neighboring Deir al-Asad formed the actual village of St. George de la Beyne, which served as the fief's administrative center. The nearby villages of Sajur (Saor) and Buqei'a (Bouquiau) were also part of the fief. The Italian archaeologist and priest Bellarmino Bagatti noted that in the old core of Bi'ina are two homes with medieval-style, pointed-arched doorways. According to the historian Denys Pringle, these closely resemble those of Frankish structures and may indicate the presence of a complex related to the administration of the fief.

St. George de la Beyne was exchanged by Philip, head of the Milly family (fl. 1138–1171), for lands in Transjordan and the hills around Hebron. The king of Jerusalem became the fief's seigneur and the services of Henry of Milly, a wealthy brother of Philip, were transferred to the king as well. Henry and his household continued to reside in St. George de la Beyne. Upon Henry's death in 1164, St. George de la Beyne was bequeathed to his daughter Helvis. In November 1179, the village came under a seven-year stewardship of Joscelyn III of Courtenay, the husband of Helvis' sister Agnes of Milly. Before the expiration of the grant, in February 1182, Joscelyn gained full control of St. George de la Beyne. After the Muslim forces of Ayyubid sultan Saladin routed the Crusaders at the Battle of Hattin in 1187, the fief's territory came under Muslim control. In May 1188, while it remained in Muslim hands, the fief was legally transferred by Conrad of Montferrat to the Pisans, who were defending the fortress of Tyre at that time.

The area reverted to Crusader rule by 1220, after which St. George de la Beyne was once again under control by descendants of Henry of Milly and Josceleyn III. After a number of grants by these descendants, the fief gradually came under the full control of the Teutonic Order by 1249. The Assizes of Jerusalem treatise written by John of Ibelin in c. 1265 noted that the fief's lands supported ten knights, a large number compared to neighboring fiefs, like that of Mi'iliya (Chastel dou Rei), which supported four knights. A 13th-century map referred to the place as a ciuitas (large urban settlement). In June 1271, after the Muslims under the Mamluk sultan Baybars captured Montfort Castle in the hill country northwest of St. George de la Beyne, the fief became part of a 'no-man's land' between the Acre-based Crusader kingdom and the Mamluk empire. In July 1271, Prince Edward I of England led an army of Templars and Hospitallers in a raid against the village of St. George de la Beyne, destroying it, massacring several of its 'Saracen' (Muslim or Arab) inhabitants and capturing a substantial amount of war booty. According to Pringle, there were likely "economic rather than strategic" motives for this targeted raid by the Crusaders of "such a small and apparently defenceless village" since "in earlier times the fief had been extremely wealthy".

In 1283, Burchard of Mount Sion referred to St. George de la Beyne as "a village called Sangeor" located five leagues from Acre "in between the mountains, in a very rich, fertile and pleasant valley". He also noted that "it was believed" that Saint George was born in the village. The combined site of Deir al-Asad and Bi'ina remained inhabited under the Mamluks. The historian al-Qalqashandi (d. 1418) noted it was a village of the Sajur (Shaghur) district and contained a monastery (in modern Deir al-Asad).

=== Ottoman Empire ===
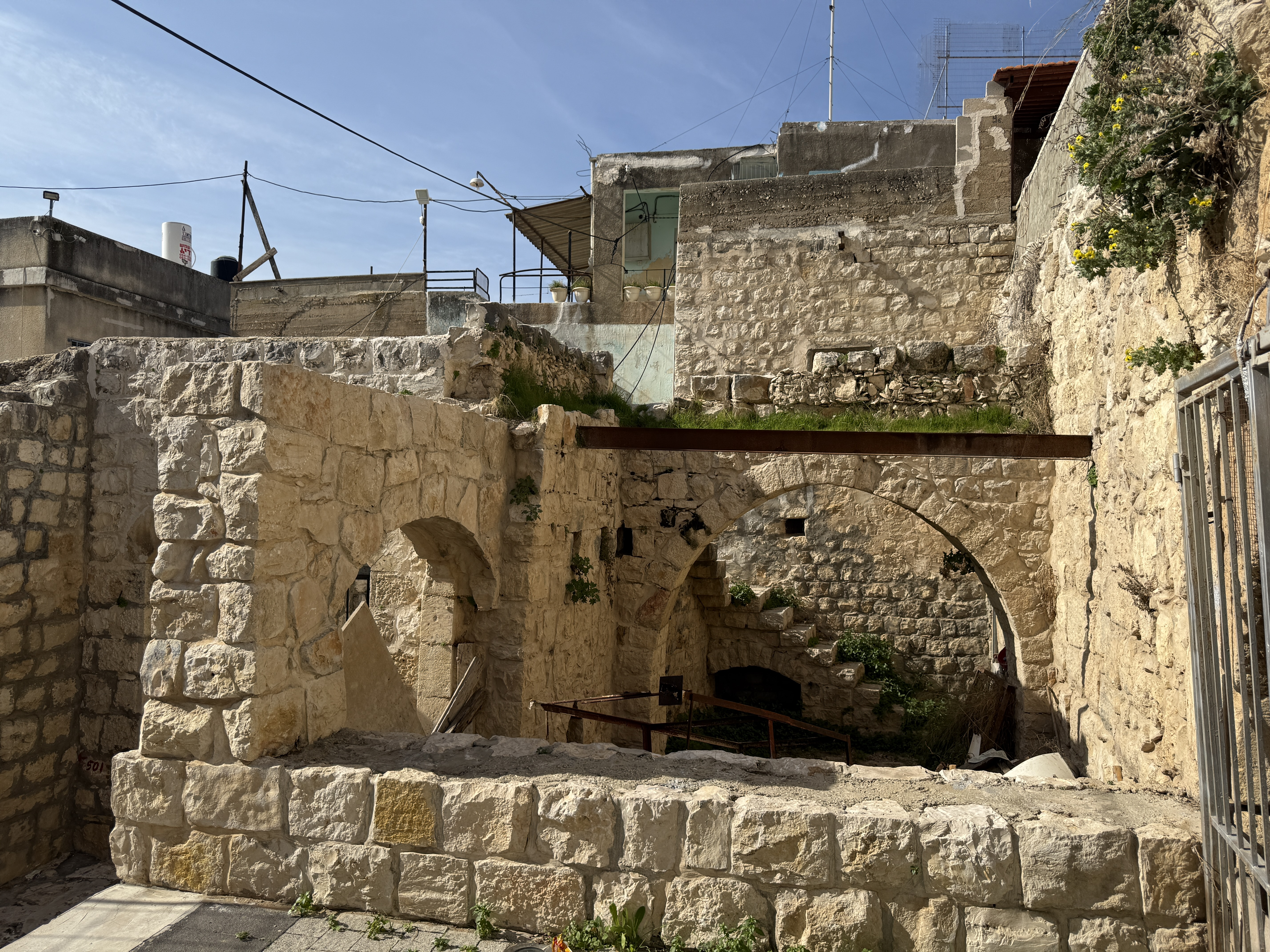
Buildings in the old core of Bi'ina, 2025

==== 16th century ====
In 1517 Palestine was conquered by the Ottoman Empire from the Mamluks. Around this time, possibly as early as 1510, the Sufi sheikh Muhammad al-Asad had settled in the monastery in present-day Deir al-Asad, which at that time was referred to in the Arabic sources as Dayr al-Bi'ina ('monastery of al-Bi'ina') or Deir al-Khidr ('monastery of al-Khidr', i.e. of Saint George). Under order of the Ottoman sultan Selim I (r. 1512–1520), a major patron of the Sufis, the Christian inhabitants of Dayr al-Bi'ina were expelled from the village, so that eventually a significant Muslim settlement could be established there under the auspices of Muhammad al-Asad and his followers. Dayr al-Bi'ina was thereafter called Dayr al-Asad after the sheikh and the expelled Christians established the modern village of Bi'ina at its present site, about 0.5 kilometers (0.31 mi) to the south of Dayr al-Bi'ina. According to local tradition, the present Christian inhabitants of Bi'ina are the descendants of the expelled Christians. Ottoman tax registers from 1548 or 1596 record Bi'ina as a village in the nahiya (subdistrict) of Acre in the Safed Sanjak. It had a population of 61 households, of which 46 were Muslim and 15 Christian. The villagers paid a fixed tax rate of 25% on agricultural products, including wheat, barley, olives, cotton, goats or beehives, in addition to a press for grapes or olives; a total of 7,134 akçe. (Note: Note that Harold Rhode, 1979, p. 6 Archived 2019-04-20 at the Wayback Machine writes that the register that Hütteroth and Abdulfattah studied from the Safad-district was not from 1595/6, but from 1548/9.)

==== 18th century ====
By the early 18th century, the Banu Zaydan (or Zayadina), an Arab family based around Tiberias, held sway in the Shaghur and their future leader, Daher al-Umar, played a prominent role defending Bi'ina from a taxation campaign by the Ottoman governor of Sidon between 1713 and 1718. The event helped establish Daher's good reputation with the area's inhabitants. By 1730, Daher had gained control of Tiberias as its multazim (tax farmer) and within a few years moved to expand his domains. In 1740, he besieged Bi'ina, by then a fortified village, but after failing to capture it, secured control of it by forming a pact with its headman, sealed by his marriage to the headman's daughter.

After Daher was slain in an imperial Ottoman campaign against him, the new, Acre-based governor of Sidon, Jazzar Pasha, moved to eliminate Zaydani control in the Galilee. Daher's son Ali posed the main challenge to Jazzar's rule in the region and controlled several fortified villages in the central and eastern Galilee, including Bi'ina. After a string of victories against Ali, Jazzar gained control of the area in 1776. A map from Napoleon's invasion of 1799, during Jazzar's rule, by Pierre Jacotin showed the place, named as "El Bena".

==== 19th century ====
In 1838, Bi'ina was noted as a Greek Christian village in the Shaghur district, located between Safed, Acre and Tiberias. In the mid-19th-century (pre-1859), William McClure Thomson noted that Bi'ina and Deir al-Asad were clustered together and abounded in antiquities, "more ... than are to be found in most ... Galilean villages". In 1875, Victor Guérin noted that the population was divided between Druze and Greek Orthodox Christians. He listed a mosque and a Greek church, both of which were built on the sites of older churches. In the late 19th century, Bi'ina was described as a village built of stone and surrounded by olive groves and arable land. Water was supplied by a spring and a pool. The population consisted of 300 Muslims and 100 Christians. A sarcophagus was also seen lying outside the village. Lieutenant Kitchener of the Palestine Exploration Fund noted the village contained a spring and birkeh (reservoir). A population list from about 1887 showed that Bi'ina had 620 inhabitants; slightly more Muslims than Greek Catholic Christians.

=== British Mandate ===
In the 1922 census of Palestine conducted by the British Mandate authorities, Bi'ina had a population of 518; 311 Muslims and 207 Christians, where all the Christians were Orthodox. By the 1931 census the population had increased to 651 (441 Muslims and 210 Christians) living in a total of 133 houses.

In the 1945 statistics, Bi'ina had 830 inhabitants; 530 Muslims and 300 Christians. They owned 14,839 dunams of land, while 57 dunams were public. 1,619 dunams were plantations and irrigable land, 5,543 used for cereals, while 57 dunams were built-up (urban) land.

=== Israel ===
During Operation Hiram, 29–31 October 1948, the village surrendered to the advancing Israeli army. Many of the villagers fled north but some remained and were not expelled. The village remained under martial law until 1966.

In 1981, a Bedouin neighborhood was created in the village, populated by members of the Sawaed tribe from Rame. In 2001, the village was spread out over an area of some 30 dunams (7.4 acres).

== Voting Patterns ==
In the 2022 election, 97 percent of voters in Bi'ina voted for the Arab parties, while 1 percent voted for the parties of the center-left coalition led by Yair Lapid and 1 percent voted for the parties of the right-wing coalition led by Benjamin Netanyahu. Among the voters for the Arab parties, 39 percent voted for Ra'am, while 37 percent voted for the Hadash–Ta'al list and 24 percent voted for Balad.

In the 2026 election, 98 percent of voters in Bi'ina voted for the Arab parties, while 1.5 percent voted for the parties of the center-left coalition led by Gadi Eisenkot and 0.4 percent voted for the parties of the right-wing coalition led by Benjamin Netanyahu. Among the voters for the Arab parties, 58 percent voted for the Joint List, while 42 percent voted for Ra'am. Voter turnout increased 46 percent from the 2022 election.

== Notable people ==
- Mohammad Bakri
- Salim Daw

== Bibliography ==
- Aharoni, Y. (1957). The Settlement of the Tribes of Israel in the Upper Galilee. Jerusalem: Magnes Press.
- Albright, W.F. (1922). "Contribution to the Historical Geography of Palestine". The Annual of the American Schools of Oriental Research. 2–3: 1–46.
- Albright, W.F. (1923). Warren J. Moulton (ed.). "Beth Anath". The Annual of the American Schools of Oriental Research. 2–3. New Haven: Yale University Press. JSTOR 3768450.
- Barron, J.B., ed. (1923). Palestine: Report and General Abstracts of the Census of 1922. Government of Palestine.
- Cohen, Amnon (1973). Palestine in the 18th Century: Patterns of Government and Administration. Jerusalem: The Magnes Press. ISBN 978-0-19-647903-3.
- Conder, C.R.; Kitchener, H.H. (1881). The Survey of Western Palestine: Memoirs of the Topography, Orography, Hydrography, and Archaeology. Vol. 1. London: Committee of the Palestine Exploration Fund. (p. 153)
- Ellenblum, R. (2003). Frankish Rural Settlement in the Latin Kingdom of Jerusalem. Cambridge University Press. ISBN 9780521521871.
- Frankel, Rafael; Getzov, Nimrod; Aviam, Mordechai; Degani, Avi (2001). "Settlement Dynamics and Regional Diversity in Ancient Upper Galilee (Archaeological Survey of Upper Galilee)". Israel Antiquities Authority. 14.
- Gal, Zvi (1988). "The Late Bronze Age in Galilee: A Reassessment". Bulletin of the American Schools of Oriental Research. 272 (272): 79–84. doi:10.2307/1356788. JSTOR 1356788. S2CID 164010807.
- Government of Palestine, Department of Statistics (1945). Village Statistics, April, 1945.
- Guérin, V. (1880). Description Géographique Historique et Archéologique de la Palestine (in French). Vol. 3: Galilee, pt. 1. Paris: L'Imprimerie Nationale.
- Hadawi, S. (1970). Village Statistics of 1945: A Classification of Land and Area Ownership in Palestine. Palestine Liberation Organization Research Center.
- Hütteroth, W.-D.; Abdulfattah, K. (1977). Historical Geography of Palestine, Transjordan and Southern Syria in the Late 16th Century. Erlanger Geographische Arbeiten, Sonderband 5. Erlangen, Germany: Vorstand der Fränkischen Geographischen Gesellschaft. ISBN 978-3-920405-41-4.
- Joudah, Ahmad Hasan (2013). Revolt in Palestine in the Eighteenth Century: The Era of Shaykh Zahir al-Umar (Second ed.). Gorgias Press. ISBN 978-1-4632-0002-2.
- Karmon, Y. (1960). "An Analysis of Jacotin's Map of Palestine" (PDF). Israel Exploration Journal. 10 (3–4): 155–173, 244–253. Archived from the original (PDF) on 2019-12-22.
- Klein, S. (1934). "Notes on History of Large Estates in Palestine". Yediot - Bulletin of the Jewish Palestine Exploration Society. 1: 18–34.
- Layish, Aharon (1987). ""Waqfs" and Ṣūfī Monasteries in the Ottoman Policy of Colonization: Sulṭan Selīm I's "waqf" of 1516 in Favour of Dayr al-Asad". Bulletin of the School of Oriental and African Studies, University of London. 50 (1): 61–89. doi:10.1017/S0041977X00053192. JSTOR 616894.
- Manna, A. (2022). Nakba and Survival The Story of Palestinians Who Remained in Haifa and the Galilee, 1948–1956. Oakland: University of California Press. ISBN 9780520389366.
- Mills, E., ed. (1932). Census of Palestine 1931. Population of Villages, Towns and Administrative Areas. Jerusalem: Government of Palestine.
- Morris, B. (1987). The Birth of the Palestinian Refugee Problem. Cambridge University Press. ISBN 978-0-521-33028-2.
- Palmer, E. H. (1881). The Survey of Western Palestine: Arabic and English Name Lists Collected During the Survey by Lieutenants Conder and Kitchener, R. E. Transliterated and Explained by E.H. Palmer. Committee of the Palestine Exploration Fund.
- Philipp, T. (2001). Acre: The Rise and Fall of a Palestinian City, 1730–1831. Columbia University Press. ISBN 978-0-231-50603-8.
- Pringle, D. (1993). The Churches of the Crusader Kingdom of Jerusalem: A-K (excluding Acre and Jerusalem). Cambridge University Press. ISBN 9780521390361.
- Rhode, H. (1979). Administration and Population of the Sancak of Safed in the Sixteenth Century (PhD). Columbia University. Archived from the original on 2020-03-01.
- Robinson, E.; Smith, E. (1841). Biblical Researches in Palestine, Mount Sinai and Arabia Petraea: A Journal of Travels in the year 1838. Vol. 3. Boston: Crocker & Brewster.
- Röhricht, R. (1893). (RRH) Regesta regni Hierosolymitani (MXCVII-MCCXCI) (in Latin). Berlin: Libraria Academica Wageriana. (p. 188 no 674; p. 248 no 934; p. 256 no 974; p. 308 no 1175)
- Safrai, Z. (1976). "Beth-Anath". Sinai. 78: 18–34.
- Schumacher, G. (1888). "Population list of the Liwa of Akka". Quarterly Statement–Palestine Exploration Fund. 20: 169–191.
- Thomson, W. M. (1882). The Land and the Book: Central Palestine and Phoenicia. New York: Harper and Brothers.
