= Ahmed Dabbah =

Israeli Arab politician

- احْمَد ذَبّاح
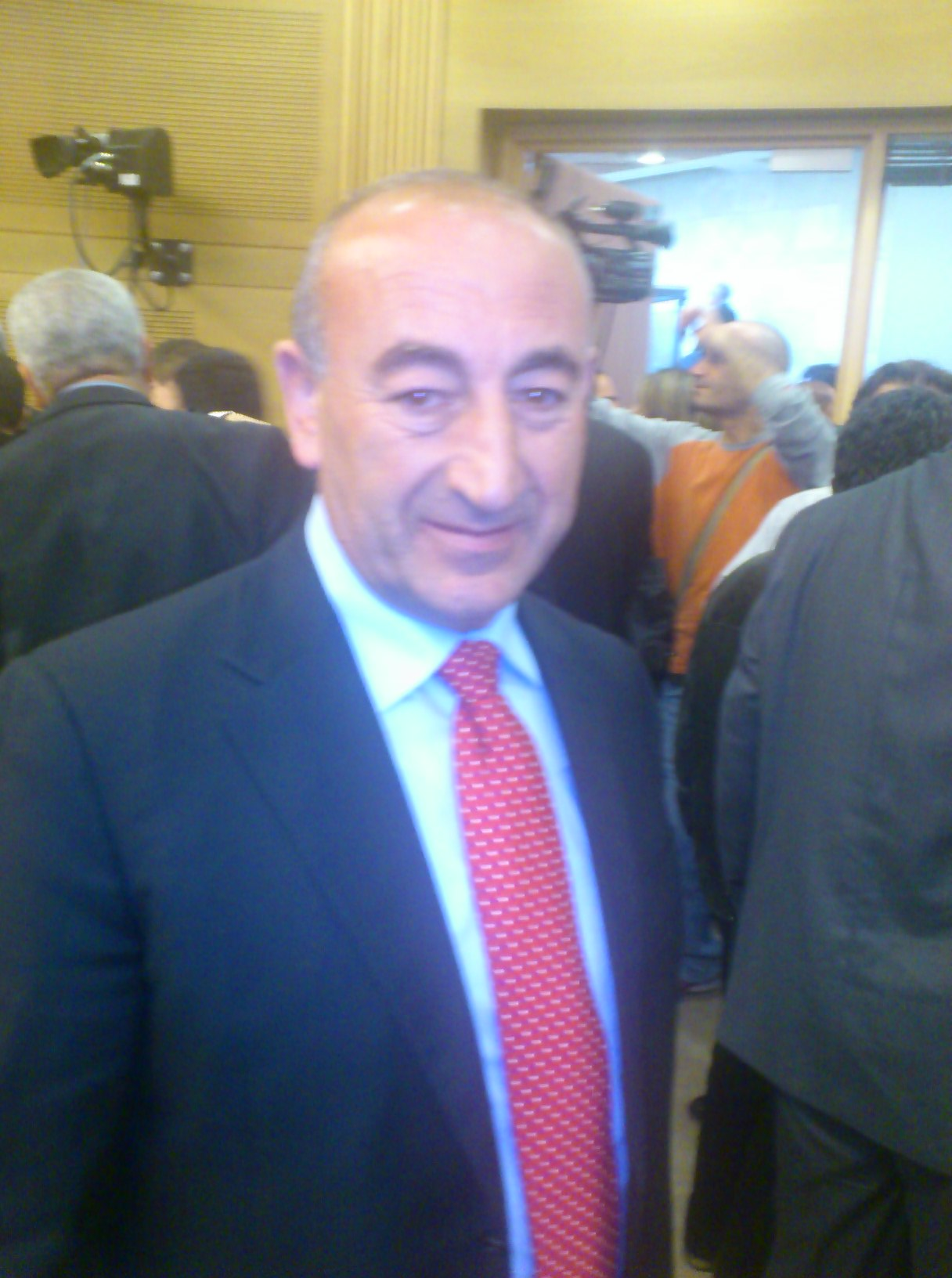

Faction represented in the Knesset
- 2012–2013: Kadima

Personal details
- Born: 27 January 1955 (age 71)

Ahmed Dabbah (Arabic: احْمَد ذَبّاح, Hebrew: אחמד דבאח; born 27 January 1955) is an Israeli Arab politician who served as a member of the Knesset for Kadima between 2012 and 2013, the party's first non-Druze Arab MK. He also served as mayor of Deir al-Asad and the now-dissolved city of Shaghur.

== Biography ==
Dabbah started his career as a primary school teacher, before becoming the owner and CEO of "Saleh Dabbah and Sons", a business conglomerate including supermarkets and a slaughterhouse, as well as establishing the Dabbah shopping mall in Deir al-Asad. He has nine children.

=== Political career ===
In 1992 he joined Likud, but transferred to Kadima after it was founded in 2005, becoming one of its leading activists. Although he was given a high placing by Ariel Sharon on the party's original list for the 2006 Knesset elections, he was ultimately placed only 51st on the final list, and failed to win a seat as the party won only 29. He was placed 36th on the party's list for the 2009 elections, but again failed to win a seat as the party won only 28 seats.

Dabbah has been the mayor of Deir-el-Asad, as well as the head of the Shagur Local Council. As mayor of Deir-el-Asad, Dabbah helped Shaul Mofaz gain votes among the Arab-Israeli public, who was running to replace Tzipi Livni as leader of Kadima. Dabbah helped bring 1,121 votes from his town of Deir-el-Asad for Shaul Mofaz, which totals more votes than both Mofaz's and Livni's combined votes from Tel Aviv, which numbered 1,112. Dabbah has said that he is a public figure that the public trusts, and objects to being called a "vote contractor."

Dabbah was sworn into the Knesset on 16 August 2012 as a replacement for Avi Dichter, who had resigned his seat on 14 August after leaving the party in order to join the Netanyahu government as an independent. This took the number of Arab members of the Knesset to 17, a record.

Placed ninth on the Kadima list for the 2013 elections, he lost his seat as the party were reduced to two MKs.
