= Adel Manna =

Israeli historian of Ottoman Palestine (born 1947)

Adel Manna (Arabic: عادل مناع, romanized: ʿĀdal Mannāʿ; born October 20, 1947) is a Palestinian historian specializing in Palestine in the Ottoman period and the mid-20th century. He was the director of the Academic Institute for Arab Teacher Training at Beit Berl College, and the head of the Department for Arab Society in Israel at the Van Leer Jerusalem Institute. Adel Manna was born in Majd al-Krum, Mandatory Palestine (now Israel).

== Works ==
- The Notables of Palestine at the End of the Ottoman Period, 1800-1918 (1995)
- History of Palestine During the Late Ottoman Period, 1700-1918 (1999)
- Society and Administration in Jerusalem during the Middle Ottoman Period (2008)
- Two Sides of the Coin: Independence and Nakba 1948. Two Narratives of the 1948 War and Its Outcome (with Motti Golani, 2011)
- Nakba and Survival: The Story of Palestinians Who Remained in Haifa and the Galilee, 1948-1956 (Arabic and Hebrew, 2017)
