= Shaghur, Israel =

Shaghur: שגור; الشاغور
- City (from 2005)

Hebrew transcription(s)
  - ISO 259: Šagor
  - Also spelled: Shagor (official)
- Location within Northwest Israel Location within Israel
- Coordinates: 32°55′35″N 35°15′50″E
- Country: Israel
- District: Northern
- Founded: 2003
- Disestablished: 2008

Area
  - Total: 17,737 dunams (17.737 km^{2}; 6.848 sq mi)

Population (2007)
  - Total: 29,900
  - Density: 1,690/km^{2} (4,370/sq mi)
- Name meaning: (the) valley

Shaghur or Shagor (Hebrew: שגור; Arabic: الشاغور, ash-Shaghur) was an Arab city in the Northern District of Israel located east of the coastal city of Acre (Akka). It was formed in 2003 with the merger of three Arab local councils – Majd al-Krum, Deir al-Asad and Bi'ina. It was declared a city in 2005. The city was dissolved on December 1, 2008, by Knesset decree and the pre-2003 component villages were given independent standing. It is the third largest Arab locality in the Northern District after Nazareth and Shefa-'Amr. The name Shaghur comes from the name of the nearby valley which borders the al-Araas mountain in which the city is built upon. The city had a population of 29,900 at the end of 2007.

== History ==
Majd al-Kurum, Deir al-Asad and Bi'ina were largely agricultural. The main crops were olives, figs, citrus and pomegranates. The three villages were captured by Haganah forces on October 30, 1948, in Operation Dekel during the 1948 Arab-Israeli War. In 1956 about 1,275 acres (5.16 km^{2}) of land in the region were designated "closed areas" by the Israeli government, and became the basis for Karmiel.

During the 2006 Lebanon War, 43 Katyusha rockets fired by Hezbollah landed in or near Shaghur, killing four civilians. The rockets were apparently aimed at Karmiel and an alleged artillery installment on a nearby hill. The victims were Muhammad Subhi Mana, Baha Karim, Miriam Assadi and Fathi Assadi.

== Demographics ==
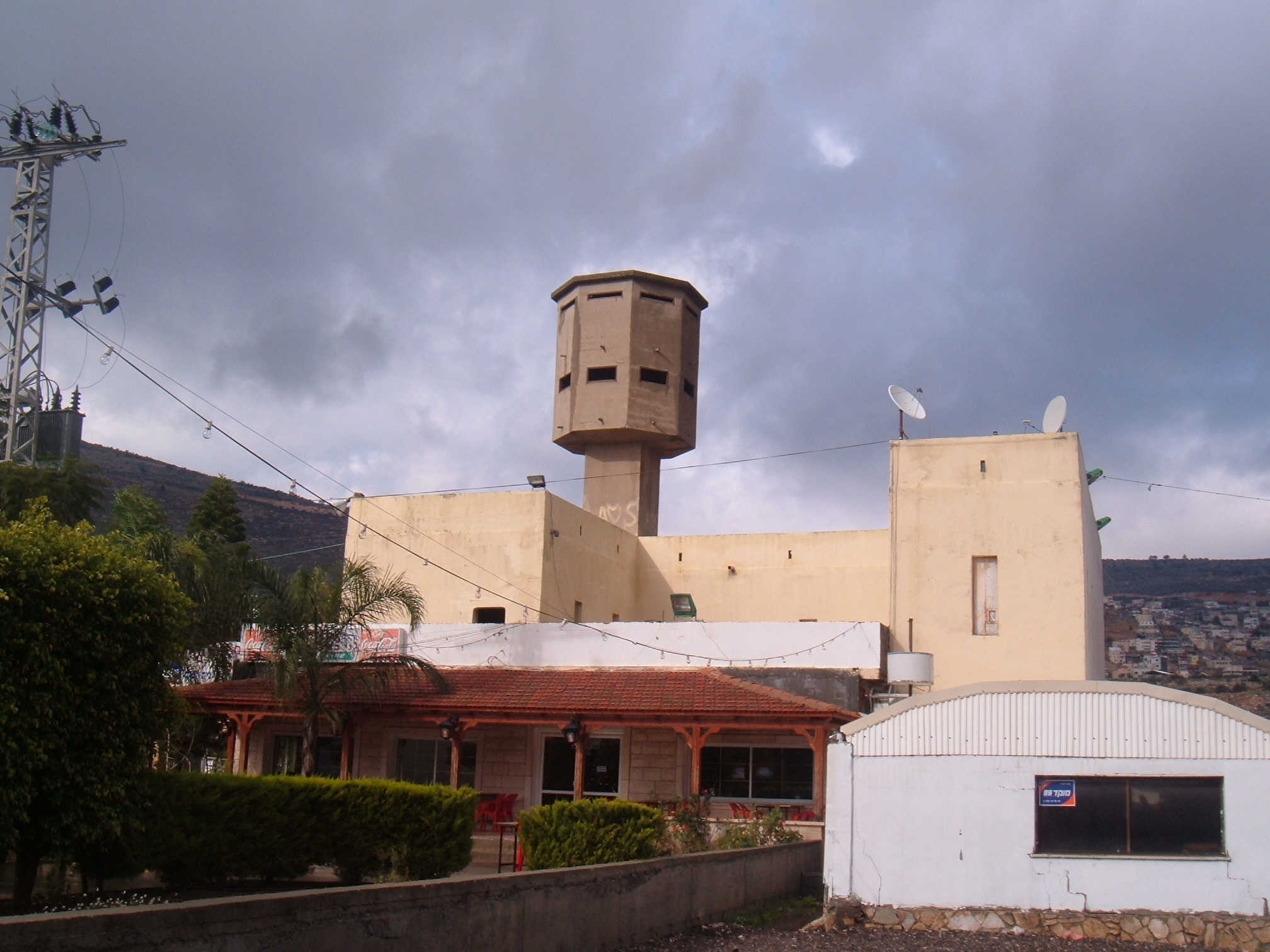
A former Tegart fort in the Majd al-Krum area that was transformed into a restaurant

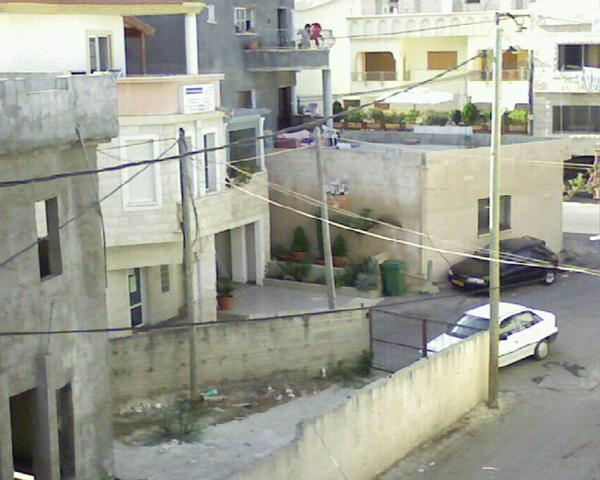
Houses in central Majd al-Krum

In 1948, most of the villagers remained in the area and were joined by several refugees from al-Birwa. Some residents of Majd al-Krum settled in the Shatila refugee camp in Lebanon. According to Abu Nisa, a former resident of Majd al-Krum, some have obtained European citizenship and have come back to visit.

In 2005 there were 14,600 males and 13,900 females in Shaghur. The age distribution was 49.4% 19 years of age or younger, 17% between the ages of 20–29, 19.8% between the ages of 30–44, 10.6% between the ages of 45–64 and 3.2% 65 and older. The percentage of families with four or more children was 34.01% in 2003. The city's population increased by 7% in 2005 and in total, approximately by 2,500 persons.

== Economy ==
The city has rapidly drifted from a mostly agricultural-based economy into a commercial center and midway between the Galilee's coastal cities and Nazareth and for surrounding villages and local councils. It remains in friendly and cooperative communication with the neighboring city of Karmiel and the nearby Arab local councils of Nahf and Rame. The city is filled with restaurants, various shops and stores and three gas stations as well as a weekly souk or open-air market.

Despite the merger of the three old municipalities, Shaghur's economy is not improving as expected and the city still remains quite poor and unmanaged due to political boycotts. According to the CBS, in 2004, there were 6,674 salaried workers. The mean monthly salary was 3,663 NIS The city's average income per capita decreased by −1.04 NIS to 1,093 NIS ranking it Israel's 19th poorest municipality. The number of employed persons in the city that received above twice the average wage was 1.45% in 2003. Its population density is also increasing because of the city's inability to expand residentially and commercially beyond its jurisdiction.

== Education ==
According to the CBS, Shaghur has eighteen schools (nine elementary, three middle and six secondary). In total, there are 7,473 students; 4,276 in elementary, 1,822 in middle and 1,375 in middle school. In 2005, 43.5% of 12th grade students received matriculation certificates – an increase of 11.45% in 2003. The percentage of students aged 20–25 was 5.64% in 2003.

== Politics ==
The recently formed city has experienced a lack of cooperation between its two major components, Majd al-Krum and Deir al-Asad, in the wake of recent elections for city mayor won by a candidate from Deir al-Asad, Ahmed Dabbah. The residents of Majd al-Krum, refusing to abide by the leadership of a Deir al-Asad man, boycotted the new local government, and this particular area consequently is at an economic and social disadvantage relative to the other neighborhoods that make up Shaghur.

== Sports ==
Shaghur does not have any official sports teams to represent the city, however, two of its components maintain football teams. In 2005–2006, Maccabi Bi'ina, Beitar Bi'ina, Deir al-Asad participated in the Northern Divisions of Liga Gimel.

== Notable residents ==
- Ahmed Dabbah - MK representing Kadima party, former mayor of Shaghur

== See also ==
- Arab localities in Israel
- List of cities in Israel
- Upper Galilee
