= Deir al-Asad =

Deir al-Asad: דייר אל-אסד; دير الأسد
- Local council (from 2008)
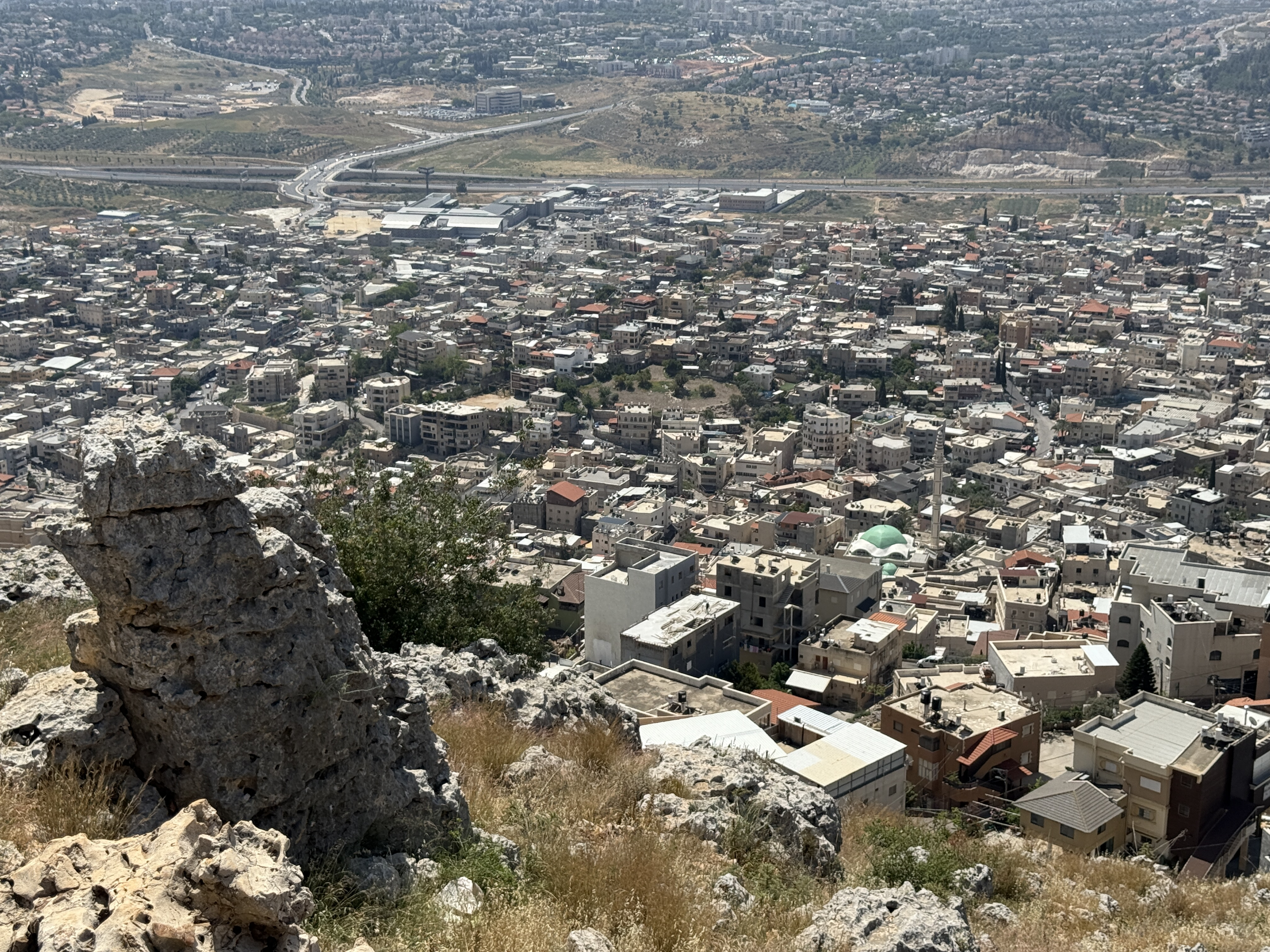
- View of Deir al-Asad from the Zurim Cliff, 2025. The city of Karmiel seen beyond the highway.

- Location within Northwest Israel Location within Israel
- Coordinates: 32°55′11″N 35°16′19″E
- Grid position: 175/260 PAL
- Country: Israel
- District: Northern
- Subdistrict: Acre
- Natural Region: Karmi'el

Government
  - Head of Municipality: Ahmed Dabbah

Area
  - Total: 4,756 dunams (4.756 km^{2}; 1.836 sq mi)

Population
  - Total: 12,619
  - Density: 2,653/km^{2} (6,872/sq mi)
- Name meaning (literal): the lion's monastery

Deir al-Asad (Arabic: دير الأسد; Hebrew: דֵיר אֶל-אַסַד) is an Arab village in the Galilee region of Israel, near Karmiel.

Together with the adjacent village of Bi'ina it formed the site of the Crusader monastery town of St. George de la Beyne, an administrative center of the eponymous fief which spanned part of the central Galilee. Control of the fief changed several times from the noble Milly family to Joscelyn III of Courtenay and ultimately to the Teutonic Order before the area passed to Cairene Mamluk rule in the late 13th century. Settlement continued under the Mamluks and the village's St. George monastery was mentioned as treating the mentally ill in the late 14th century. The modern Muslim village of Deir al-Asad, previously known as Deir al-Bi'ina or Deir al-Khidr, was established in 1516 when the Ottoman sultan Selim I granted its monastery as a waqf (religious endowment) to the Sufi sage Shaykh Muhammad al-Asad, who settled in it with his family and devotees. The village's original Christian population was expelled by the same order and relocated to Bi'ina, while a Druze community which established itself in the village emigrated to the Hauran by the late 1870s.

The village was captured by Israel in the 1948 Palestine War, immediately after which it was emptied of its inhabitants as part of the 1948 Palestinian expulsions and looted by Israeli troops. Its residents were allowed to return, though several became Palestinian refugees in the Ain al-Hilweh camp in Lebanon. A significant area of agricultural land nearby was used by the authorities to create part of the new Jewish city of Karmiel in 1962. Most of Deir al-Asad's residents belong to the clans of Asadi, descendants of Shaykh Muhammad al-Asad, and Dabbah, established in the village in the 18th century. In 2003 Deir al-Asad was merged with Bi'ina and nearby Majd al-Krum to form the single municipality of Shaghur, the Arabic name of the valley in which the towns are located, but the union was dissolved in 2008.

== Etymology ==
Deir al-Asad literally translates from Arabic as 'the lion's monastery'.

== History ==
=== Crusader, Ayyubid and Mamluk periods ===
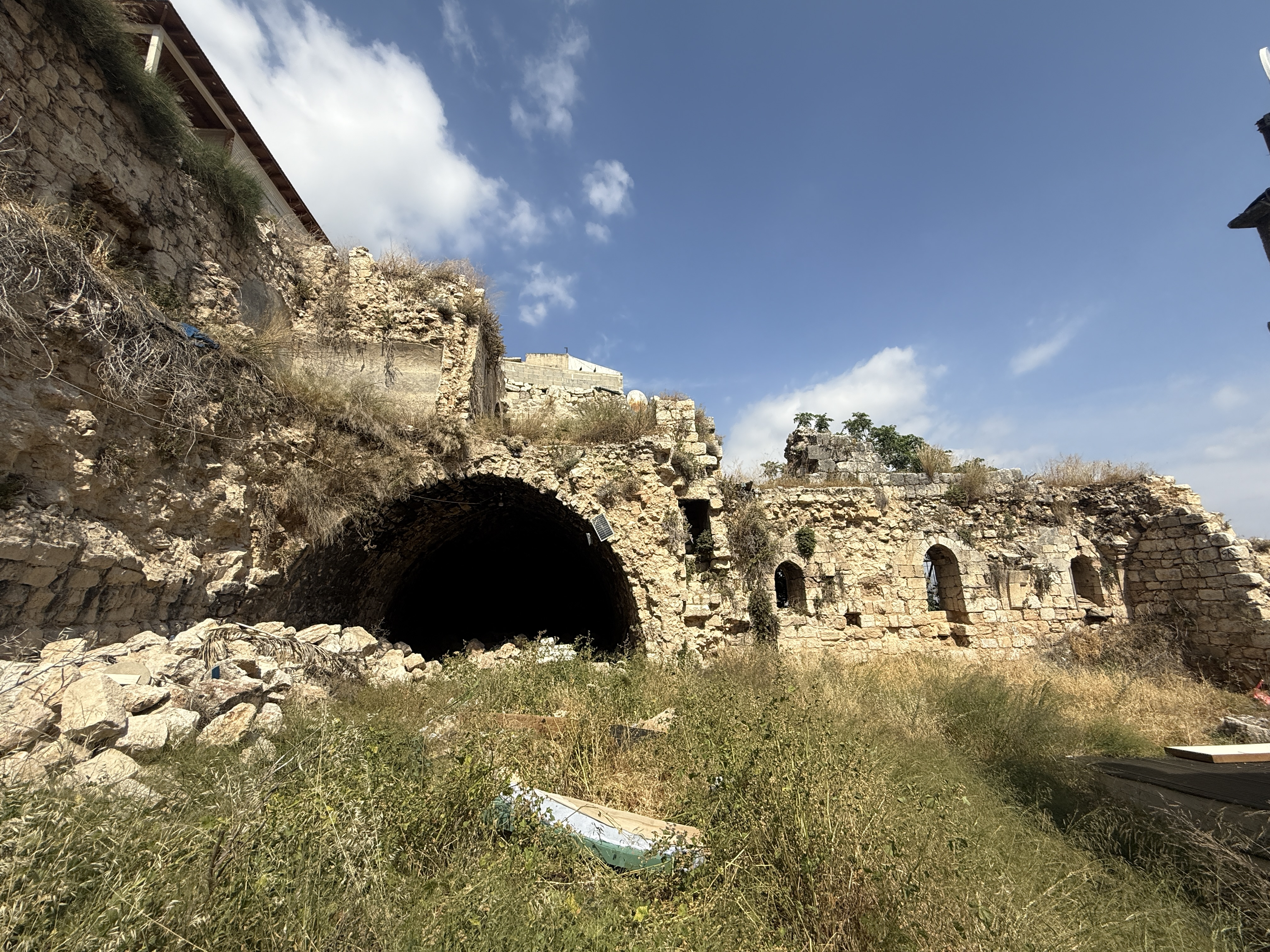
Remains of the Crusader-era Church of St. George in Deir al-Asad, 2025

During the Crusader period (12th–13th centuries), the area around modern Deir al-Asad operated as a fief known as 'St. George de la Beyne' (Saint Jorge Labane). The modern villages of Deir al-Asad and Bi'ina together formed the actual village of St. George de la Beyne. This village likely served as the administrative center of the fief, which also included Sajur (Saor) and Buqei'a (Bouquiau). According to the historian Joshua Prawer, the Latin name la Beyne derived from the village's Arabic name al-Ba'ina, while 'St. George', in this case, was likely a corruption of the Arabic word sajara (lit. 'grove').

The fief was exchanged by Philip, head of the Milly family (fl. 1138–1171), for lands in Transjordan and the hills around Hebron. The king of Jerusalem became the fief's seigneur and the services of Henry of Milly, a wealthy brother of Philip, were transferred to the king as well. Henry and his household continued to reside in St. George de la Beyne. The remains of a Crusader building are located in the center of Deir al-Asad and Bi'ina and are identified as a Carthusian abbey. Upon Henry's death in 1164, St. George de la Beyne was bequeathed to his daughter Helvis. In November 1179, the village came under a seven-year stewardship of Joscelyn III of Courtenay, the husband of Helvis' sister Agnes of Milly. Before the expiration of the grant, in February 1182, Joscelyn gained full control of St. George de la Beyne. After the Muslim forces of Ayyubid sultan Saladin routed the Crusaders at the Battle of Hattin in 1187, the fief's territory came under Muslim control. In May 1188, while it remained in Muslim hands, the fief was legally transferred by Conrad of Montferrat to the Pisans, who were defending the fortress of Tyre at that time.

The area reverted to Crusader rule by 1220, after which St. George de la Beyne was once again under control by descendants of Henry of Milly and Josceleyn III. After a number of grants by these descendants, the fief gradually came under the full control of the Teutonic Order by 1249. The Assizes of Jerusalem treatise written by John of Ibelin in c. 1265 noted that the fief's lands supported ten knights, a large number compared to neighboring fiefs, like that of Mi'iliya (Chastel dou Rei), which supported four knights. A 13th-century map referred to the place as a ciuitas (large urban settlement). In June 1271, after the Muslims under the Mamluk sultan Baybars captured Montfort Castle in the hill country northwest of St. George de la Beyne, the fief became part of a 'no-man's land' between the Acre-based Crusader kingdom and the Mamluk empire. In July 1271, Prince Edward I of England led an army of Templars and Hospitallers in a raid against the village of St. George de la Beyne, destroying it, massacring several of its 'Saracen' (Muslim or Arab) inhabitants and capturing a substantial amount of war booty. According to the historian Denys Pringle, there were likely "economic rather than strategic" motives for this targeted raid by the Crusaders of "such a small and apparently defenceless village" since "in earlier times the fief had been extremely wealthy".

In 1283, Burchard of Mount Sion referred to St. George de la Beyne as "a village called Sangeor" located five leagues from Acre "in between the mountains, in a very rich, fertile and pleasant valley". He also noted that "it was believed" that Saint George was born in the village. The combined site of Deir al-Asad and Bi'ina remained inhabited under the Mamluks. The historian al-Qalqashandi (d. 1418) noted it was a village of the Sajur (Shaghur) district and contained a monastery. The Islamic head judge of Safad in the 1370s, Shams al-Din al-Uthmani, noted that the monastery treated the mentally ill.

=== Ottoman Empire ===
==== Endowment to Muhammad al-Asad ====
According to Ottoman waqf (religious endowment) documents from 1838 and likely as early as the 16th century, historical accounts, and local folklore, Deir al-Asad was granted to the 16th-century Sufi sage Shaykh Muhammad al-Asad, who was also known as Ibn Abd Allah al-Asadi, and bore the alternative epithets al-Safadi (of Safed) or al-Biqa'i (of the Beqaa Valley). The waqf documents maintain that Sultan Selim I (r. 1512–1520) was the grantor. On the other hand, the Damascene historian al-Burini (d. 1615), who was in turn copied by the historian Muhammad al-Muhibbi (d. 1699), and the village tradition hold that Sultan Suleiman (r. 1520–1566) was the grantor. The modern historian Aharon Layish considers the former version to be correct. Selim, a sultan with strong Sufi sympathies who particularly favored Ibn Arabi, to whose Sufi school Shaykh al-Asad belonged, granted the village, then known as Deir al-Bi'ina or Deir al-Khidr (deir is Arabic for monastery and al-Khidr is a name used in Arabic to refer to St. George) soon after his conquest of the coastal cities of Syria from the Mamluks in 1516.

Shaykh al-Asad was originally from the village of Hammara in the Beqaa Valley, moved to Damascus where he became a student of the Sufi sage Ibn Arraq, a follower of Ibn Arabi's school of thought, before settling in Deir al-Bi'ina by at least 1510, before the Ottoman conquest. Although local folklore attributes the name Asad (Arabic for lion) to his taming of a lion, Layish surmises that the name was already established; by his summation, Shaykh al-Asad was possibly a kinsman of Asad al-Sham Abd Allah al-Yunini (d. 1220) from Younin in the Beqaa Valley, who was a Sufi mystic and warrior in the army of Saladin in the wars against the Crusaders, or a descendant of Saladin through the latter's son al-Aziz Uthman. Selim spent two months in Damascus and likely became acquainted with Shaykh al-Asad through Ibn Arraq. Al-Burini's account holds that Shaykh al-Asad was granted the village to settle in with his children and Sufi devotees and that its original Christian inhabitants were expelled by the sultan's order; Layish theorizes that the sultan intended for the village to become a Muslim nucleus in order to strengthen Islamic control of the "security sensitive" area whose proximity to the coast left it vulnerable to European Christian penetration. Shaykh al-Asad was concurrently appointed the imam of the mosque established in the monastery of St. George and as the administrator of the waqf property. His son Ahmad (d. 1601) later founded a Sufi lodge in Safed, although according to a family tree preserved by Shaykh al-Asad's descendants, he did not have a son by this name, but rather an agnate grandson, Ahmad ibn Mahfuz. His other sons continued to reside in Deir al-Bi'ina, which became known as Deir al-Asad by dint of its association with Shaykh al-Asad.

Shaykh al-Asad died in 1569. The descendants of his four sons are known as the Asadi clan and their original area of residence forms the core of Deir al-Asad. Other Muslim clans in the village moved there to find refuge and were given the protection of the Asadi clan. The attraction to Deir al-Asad during the early Ottoman era may have stemmed from its inhabitants' exemption from army service and the village's reputation as a refuge, including for criminals evading government pursuit. According to local tradition, two brothers whose descendants formed Deir al-Asad's Dabbah clan settled in the village's upper neighborhood in the 18th century.

==== 19th century ====
Deir al-Asad possessed a large fortified monastery called St. George. The site's earlier Christian inhabitants relocated to Bi'ina, where they built a new monastery, giving to it the same name as the former. In 1838, Deir al-Asad was noted as a village in the Shaghur district, which was located between Safad, Acca and Tiberias. Deir al-Asad and nearby Bi'ina were both inhabited by members of the Druze community when Victor Guérin visited in the 1875, but by the late 1870s, they had emigrated to the Hauran to avoid conscription by the Ottoman army. In the PEF's Survey of Western Palestine (SWP) in 1881, Deir al-Asad was described as a village of 600 Muslims, containing a few ruins of the original Christian settlement. It was surrounded by olive trees and arable land, with a spring nearby. A population list from about 1887 showed that Deir al-Asad had about 725 inhabitants, all Muslims.

=== British Mandate ===
In the 1922 census of Palestine, conducted by the British Mandate authorities, Deir al-Asad had a population of 749, all Muslim, increasing in the 1931 census to 858, still all Muslims, living in total of 179 houses. By the 1945 statistics, Deir al-Asad had 1,100 inhabitants, all Muslims. They owned a total of 8,366 dunams of land, while 7 dunams were public. 1,322 dunams were plantations and irrigable land, 1,340 used for cereals, while 38 dunams were built-up (urban) land.

=== 1948 war ===
During the 1948 Palestine war units from the Arab Liberation Army left Deir al-Asad and Bi'ina on 29 October 1948 and village notables officially surrendered to Israeli forces the next day and Israel's Golani Brigade entered on 31 October. The inhabitants of both villages were assembled in the central square of Bi'ina where Israeli troops picked four men at random, two from each village, and had them executed in a nearby olive grove. A further 270 men were transferred to a prisoners-of-war camp while the remainder of the inhabitants were temporarily ousted to the environs of nearby Rameh. Israeli troops looted the villages then allowed the inhabitants to return after a few days. On 5 November Israeli troops blew up three houses in Deir al-Asad. On 6 January 1949, 62 people from villages depopulated during the war were rounded up and expelled by the Israeli authorities as part of the 1948 Palestinian expulsion and flight. A number of Deir al-Asad's inhabitants became refugees in Lebanon and some 2,500 members of the village's Asadi clan resided in the Ain al-Hilweh camp in 1982.

=== State of Israel ===
Before 1962 Deir al-Asad was self-sufficient in food. The village produced enough meat, fruit, wheat and vegetables for its inhabitants and sold the surplus in Acre or Nazareth. In 1962 its land in the Majd al-Kurum valley was expropriated for the Karmiel town project, stripping the village of its most fertile acres and irreparably harming the local economy in the process. Only the hill land to the north, consisting mainly of olive groves, remained. Today only 10% of the labour force can work on the land, over 80% commute daily to the factories of Haifa or work as labourers on Jewish farms.

The two main clans of Deir al-Asad are Asadi and Dabbah. In 1957 the Asadi clan numbered some 800 persons and by 1984, they were about 2,400, accounting for roughly half of the population.

In 2000 the Asadi and Dabbah clans each numbered about 3,000 members in the town. Members of the Asadi clan continued to administer and receive the proceeds of the waqf of Shaykh al-Asad at least through the 1980s. In 2003, the municipality of Deir al-Asad merged with Majd al-Krum and Bi'ina to form the city of Shaghur. It was reinstated in 2008 after Shaghur was dissolved. In 2022 it had a population of 12,619; 99.9% of the population was Muslim and 0.1% was Christian.

== Historic buildings ==
=== Crusader abbey and church remains ===
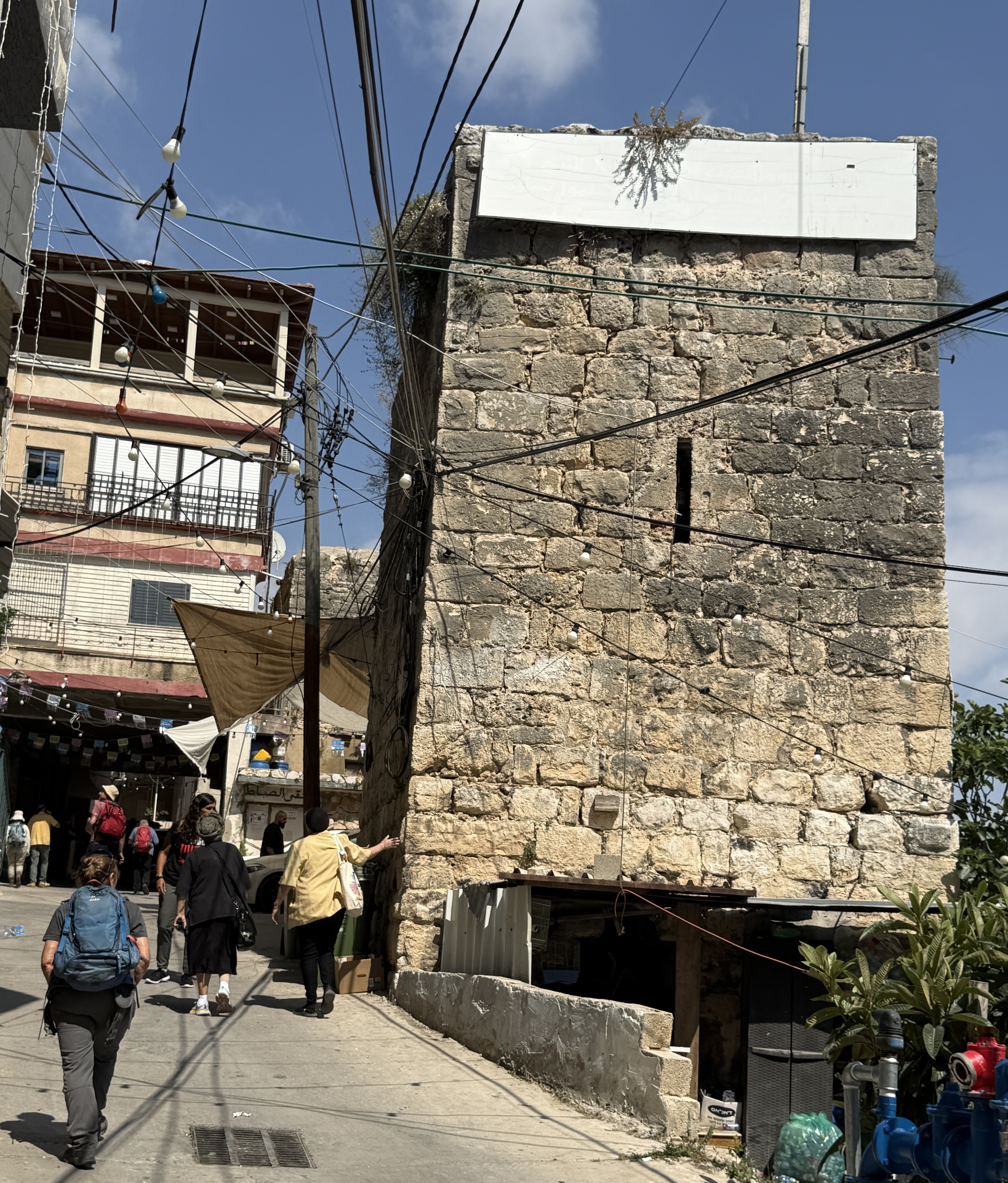
The northwest tower of the Crusader-era church of St. George, 2025

The large remains of a Crusader church and abbey was already noted by Guérin and the "Survey of Western Palestine". Guérin noted after his 1875 visit that: "Constructed of small stones very regularly cut, this church had three naves and three apses. Its windows were narrow, and fashioned like actual loopholes, and several details of its architecture show a knowledge of art. Unfortunately, the Druses have half demolished it, and what they have spared has been converted into a stable." Denys Pringle named it "The abbey Church of St. George," and dated it do the 12th century.

=== Mosque and tomb of Shaykh al-Asad al-Safadi ===
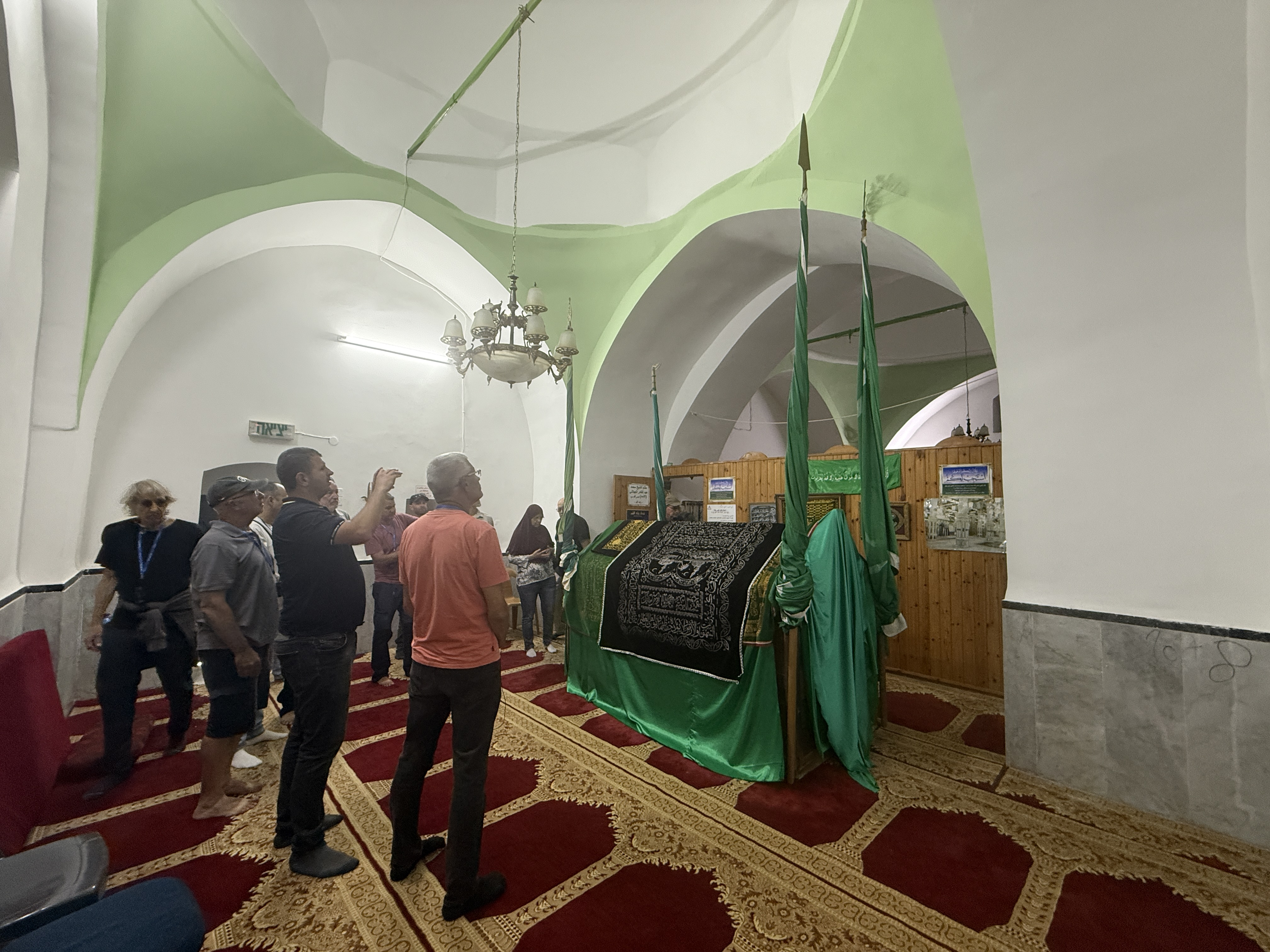
The mosque and mausoleum of Shaykh Muhammad al-Asad, 2025

The mosque and tomb of Shaykh al-Asad al-Safadi is a two-domed structure, situated about 50 meters (160 ft) south of the Crusader abbey and church remains. The smaller chamber, to the north, holds the tomb of Shyakh al-Asad, while the southern, larger chamber holds a prayer hall. To the east there is a courtyard.

== Voting Patterns ==
In the 2022 election, 94 percent of voters in Deir al-Asad voted for the Arab parties, while 3 percent voted for the parties of the center-left coalition led by Yair Lapid and 3 percent voted for the parties of the right-wing coalition led by Benjamin Netanyahu. Among the voters for the Arab parties, 48 percent voted for Ra'am, while 38 percent voted for the Hadash–Ta'al list and 14 percent voted for Balad.

In the 2026 election, 98 percent of voters in Deir al-Asad voted for the Arab parties, while 2 percent voted for the parties of the center-left coalition led by Gadi Eisenkot and 0.4 percent voted for the parties of the right-wing coalition led by Benjamin Netanyahu. Among the voters for the Arab parties, 56 percent voted for the Joint List, while 44 percent voted for Ra'am. Voter turnout increased 35 percent from the 2022 election.

== Notable people ==
- Ahmed Dabbah

== Bibliography ==
- Amun, H.; Davis, U.; San´allah, N. D. (1977). Deir al-Asad: The Destiny of an Arab Village in Galilee, in Palestinian Arabs in Israel: Two Case Studies. London: Ithaca Press.
- Barron, J.B., ed. (1923). Palestine: Report and General Abstracts of the Census of 1922. Government of Palestine.
- Conder, C.R.; Kitchener, H.H. (1881). The Survey of Western Palestine: Memoirs of the Topography, Orography, Hydrography, and Archaeology. Vol. 1. London: Committee of the Palestine Exploration Fund.
- Ellenblum, R. (2003). Frankish Rural Settlement in the Latin Kingdom of Jerusalem. Cambridge University Press. ISBN 9780521521871. (pp. 167 - 169 )
- Firro, Kais (1992). A History of the Druzes. Vol. 1. BRILL. ISBN 9004094377.
- Forte, Tania (2003). "Home in the 1990s Galilee: An Ethnographic Approach to the Study of Power Relations". In Shechter, Relli (ed.). Transitions in Domestic Consumption and Family Life in the Modern Middle East. New York: Palgrave Macmillan. pp. 135–166. ISBN 1-4039-6189-1.
- Gilmour, David (1983). Dispossessed: The Ordeal of the Palestinians. United Kingdom: Sphere Books.
- Government of Palestine, Department of Statistics (1945). Village Statistics, April, 1945.
- Guérin, V. (1880). Description Géographique Historique et Archéologique de la Palestine (in French). Vol. 3: Galilee, pt. 1. Paris: L'Imprimerie Nationale.
- Hadawi, S. (1970). Village Statistics of 1945: A Classification of Land and Area ownership in Palestine. Palestine Liberation Organization Research Center.
- Karmon, Y. (1960). "An Analysis of Jacotin's Map of Palestine" (PDF). Israel Exploration Journal. 10 (3, 4): 155–173, 244–253. Archived from the original (PDF) on 2019-12-22. (p. 165 Archived 2019-12-22 at the Wayback Machine)
- Layish, Aharon (1987). ""Waqfs" and Ṣūfī Monasteries in the Ottoman Policy of Colonization: Sulṭan Selīm I's "waqf" of 1516 in Favour of Dayr al-Asad". Bulletin of the School of Oriental and African Studies, University of London. 50 (1): 61–89. doi:10.1017/S0041977X00053192. JSTOR 616894.
- Mills, E., ed. (1932). Census of Palestine 1931. Population of Villages, Towns and Administrative Areas. Jerusalem: Government of Palestine.
- Morris, B. (2004). The Birth of the Palestinian Refugee Problem Revisited. Cambridge: Cambridge University Press. ISBN 0-521-81120-1.
- Palmer, E.H. (1881). The Survey of Western Palestine: Arabic and English Name Lists Collected During the Survey by Lieutenants Conder and Kitchener, R. E. Transliterated and Explained by E.H. Palmer. Committee of the Palestine Exploration Fund.
- Petersen, Andrew (2001). A Gazetteer of Buildings in Muslim Palestine (British Academy Monographs in Archaeology). Vol. 1. Oxford University Press. ISBN 978-0-19-727011-0. Archived from the original on 2021-05-29.
- Pringle, D. (1993). The Churches of the Crusader Kingdom of Jerusalem: A-K (excluding Acre and Jerusalem). Vol. I. Cambridge University Press. ISBN 0-521-39036-2.
- Robinson, E.; Smith, E. (1841). Biblical Researches in Palestine, Mount Sinai and Arabia Petraea: A Journal of Travels in the year 1838. Vol. 3. Boston: Crocker & Brewster.
- Schumacher, G. (1888). "Population list of the Liwa of Akka". Quarterly Statement - Palestine Exploration Fund. 20: 169–191.
