= Majd al-Krum =

Arab town in northern Israel

Majd al-Krum: מג'ד אל-כרום; مَجْدُ الْكُرُوم
- Local council

Hebrew transcription(s)
  - Also spelled: Majd al-Kurum (official)
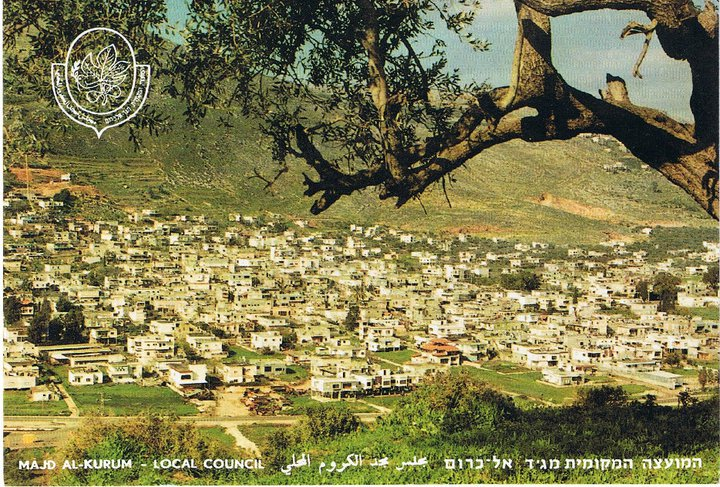
- Majd al-Krum, 1980
- Interactive map of Majd al-Krum
- Coordinates: 32°55′14″N 35°15′10″E
- Grid position: 173/258 PAL
- Country: Israel
- District: Northern
- Subdistrict: Acre
- Natural Region: Karmi'el

Area
  - Total: 5.4 km^{2} (2.1 sq mi)

Population (2024)
  - Total: 15,429
  - Density: 2,900/km^{2} (7,400/sq mi)
- Name meaning: "Watch-house of the vineyard"

Majd al-Krum (Arabic: مَجْدُ الْكُرُوم, romanized: Majd al-Kurūm; Hebrew: מג'ד אל-כרום) is an Arab town located in the Galilee in Israel's Northern District about 16 kilometers (10 miles) east of Acre. Its inhabitants are primarily Muslims. In 2024 it had a population of 15,429.

The town was a fief called Mergelcolon under the Crusaders in the 12th and 13th centuries and was recorded as a sizable village under Ottoman rule in the 16th century. In the late 18th century, the inhabitants were allied with local sheikh Daher al-Umar and his family, under whom Majd al-Krum was a locally-garrisoned and fortified village with towers. Its walls were demolished by the Ottoman governor Ahmad Pasha al-Jazzar after he captured the village in 1776.

By the late 19th century, the village consisted of three quarters, each with its own sheikh. Majd al-Krum surrendered to Israel during the 1948 war, not long after which several of its residents were executed. Many of its inhabitants became Palestinian refugees in Lebanon, while most remained and were joined by refugees from the nearby villages of Sha'ab and Birwa. It became a local council in 1964. Over two-thirds of its lands were expropriated by the state between 1949 and 1976. Its main economic activities are agriculture, quarrying, food processing and workshops.

== Name ==
The name Majd al-Krum translates from Arabic as 'watch-house of the vineyard', reflecting the town's fame for the quality of its grapevines. Rock-carved pits on the outskirts of the town were used to press the grapes to make wine since ancient times.

Majd al-Krum has been identified as Beit HaKerem, a Jewish Talmudic-period town mentioned in the Mishnah, whose name means the same in Hebrew and Arabic. Beit HaKerem was known for its arable land and abundant water sources.

== Geography ==
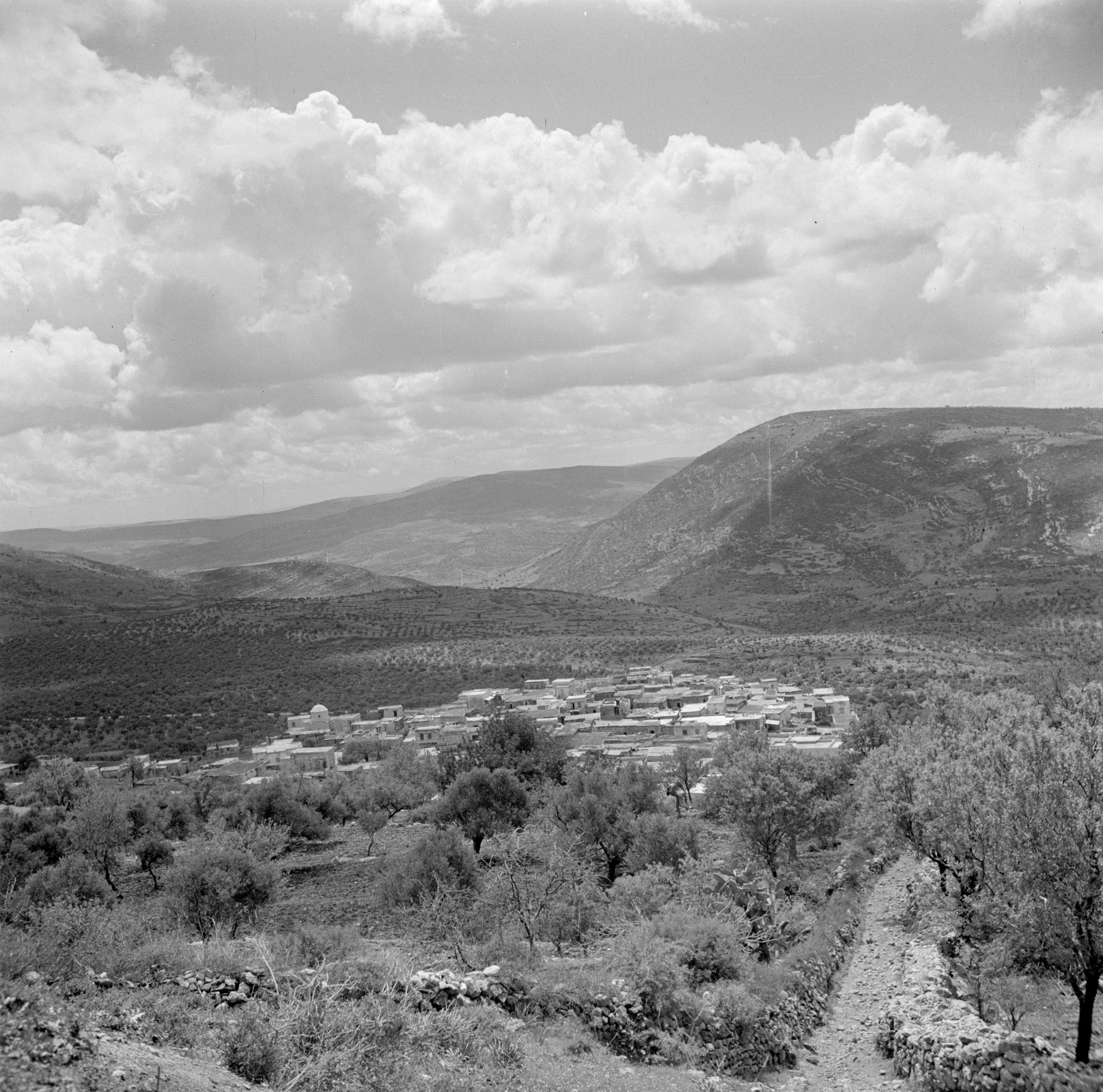
Skyline of Majd al-Krum, 1949

Majd al-Krum is in the heart of the Galilee, about 15 kilometers (9.3 mi) east of the subdistrict center of Acre and 4 kilometers (2.5 mi) west of the city of Karmiel. It is situated in the northwestern end of the Beit HaKerem Valley, called 'al-Shaghur' in Arabic, and is the valley's largest Arab locality. Historically, Majd al-Krum's importance stemmed both from its copious spring and its position at the western entrance of the valley, which serves as the shortest and most accessible route connecting Acre with the central Galilee, Safed, and Damascus to the east. Its old core sits at the foot of Jabal Mahüz, and the town has an average elevation of 220 meters (720 ft) above sea level.

=== Archaeology ===
Ancient remains, including cisterns dug into the rock, have been found in Majd al-Krum. In the center of Majd al-Krum, there is an ancient well, a spring, a Roman-era tomb and ruins dating to the Crusader period.

== History ==
=== Crusaders ===
During Crusader rule, Majd al-Krum was known as Mergelcolon and was part of a fief with the Gedin (Jiddin) castle held by Henry of Milly (d. 1164). It became part of the inheritance of his daughter Stephanie of Milly (fl. 1197). The fief of Mergelcolon and Gedin passed to Stephanie's daughter Pavia whose husband, Garnier l'Aleman (d. c. 1231), became its lord. After his death, the fief passed to his son John Aleman, who transferred the part including Mergelcolon and the neighboring villages of Beit Jann, Sajur and Nahf to the Teutonic Knights in 1249. Crusader rule over Majd al-Krum and the Shaghur valley ended with their conquest by the Mamluks in 1271.

=== Ottoman Empire ===
In 1516, the Ottoman Empire conquered the Levant from the Mamluks. An Ottoman tax register dated to 1548–1549 or 1596 lists Majd al-Krum as being in the nahiya (subdistrict) of Acre, part of the Safed Sanjak. It had a population of 85 households and five bachelors, all Muslims. The villagers paid a fixed tax rate of 25% on various agricultural products, including wheat, barley, olives or fruit trees, cotton, and goats and/or beehives; a total of 16,560 akçe. (Note: Hütteroth and Abdulfattah dated this tax register to 1596. According to Harold Rhode, the register Hütteroth and Abdulfattah studied was actually from 1548–1549.) An Ottoman document from 1573 states that the men of Majd al-Krum and nearby villages joined forces with members of the Shihab clan and the Bedouin chief Mansur ibn Furaykh of the Beqaa Valley in carrying out raids against other nearby villages which resulted in the deaths of fifty or sixty people.

During Zaydani family rule of the Galilee under Daher al-Umar (1730s–1770s), Majd al-Krum was a fortified village, with an unspecified number of towers built along its walls. It was garrisoned by the local residents, who were allied to the Zaydani family. Oral traditions from Majd al-Krum maintain that the old mosque in the village and a cluster of homes around it date to this period. Daher was killed in his Acre headquarters by the Ottomans in 1775. When his Ottoman-appointed replacement, Ahmad Pasha al-Jazzar, pursued Daher's sons, who were holding out against the governor in their Galilee strongholds, the inhabitants of Majd al-Krum supported Daher's son Ali. The latter used Majd al-Krum and nearby Abu Sinan as his main strongholds, and launched raids against Acre, prompting Jazzar to mobilize his troops in the village of Amqa. Ali gathered the fighting men of Majd al-Krum, along with Abu Sinan and Deir Hanna, and besieged Jazzar's camp. Reinforcements from Acre dispersed Ali and his men, and defeated them at Abu Sinan. Jazzar then took lead of his army and launched an assault on Majd al-Krum. According to the historian Adel Manna, the fighting took place on the plain outside of the village, and Jazzar was victorious. Once Majd al-Krum had fallen, Jazzar executed its defenders and sent their severed heads to the imperial capital at Constantinople as evidence of his success. He then proceeded against Ali, who had relocated his base to nearby Rameh.

A map from Napoleon's invasion of 1799 by Pierre Jacotin showed the place, named as El Megd El Kouroum. In 1838, Majd al-Krum was noted as a Muslim village in the Shaghur subdistrict, which was located between Safed, Acre and Tiberias. In the mid-19th century (pre-1859), William McClure Thomson, visited Majd al-Krum and noted that it had a "white-domed muzâr over the tomb" of a Muslim saint with a "striking appearance" but no ancient remains. In 1875, the French explorer Victor Guérin visited and described Majd al-Krum as being divided into three quarters, each with a different sheikh. The total population was 800 Muslims. In 1881, the Palestine Exploration Fund's Survey of Western Palestine described it as a village built of stone and surrounded by olive trees and arable land, inhabited by 600–800 Muslims. A population list from about 1887 showed that Majd al-Krum had 1,075 inhabitants, all Muslims.

=== British Mandate ===
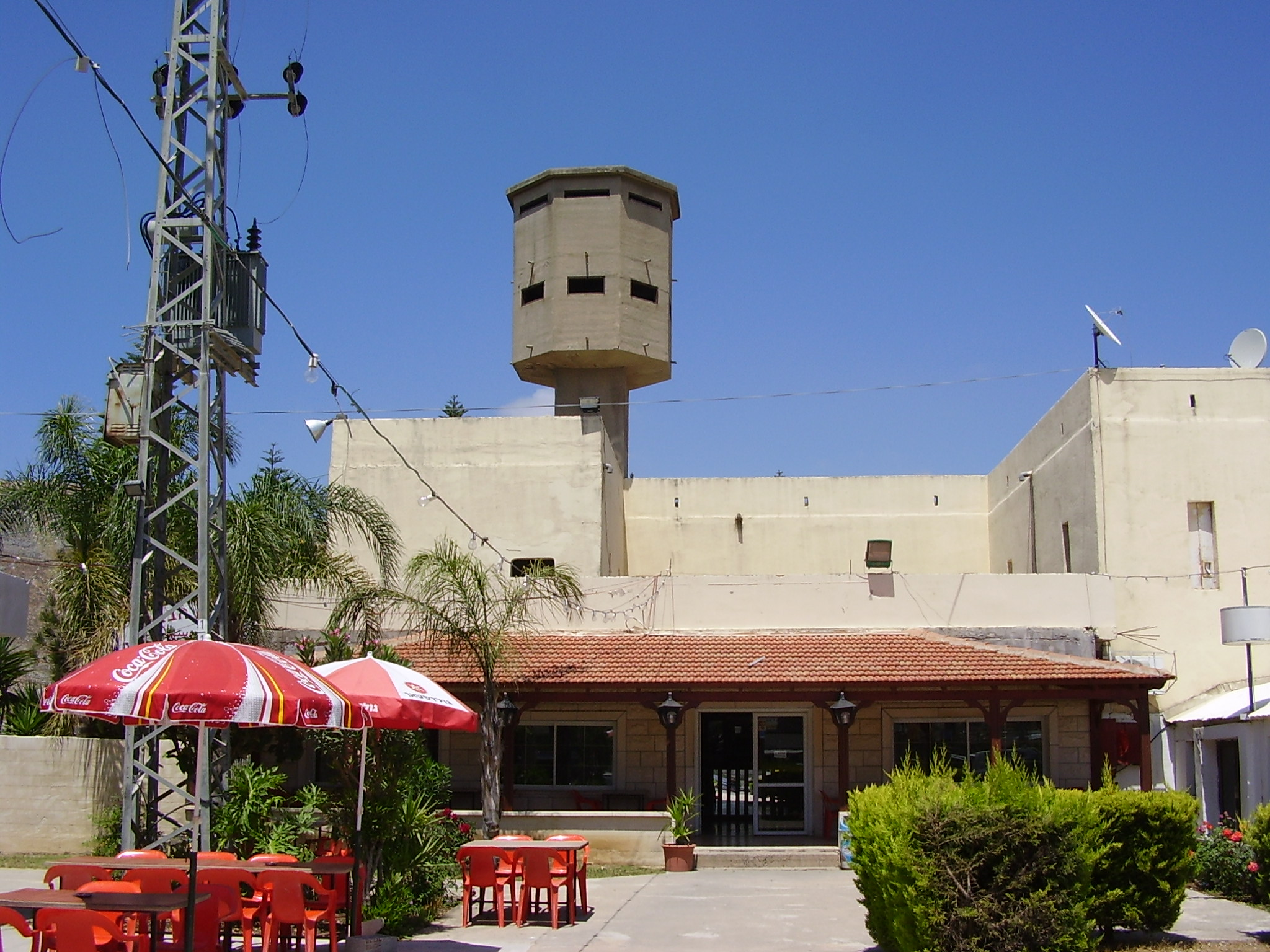
British Mandate-era Tegart police fort in Majd al-Krum, 2008

In 1917 British-led Allied Forces captured Palestine from the Ottomans and in 1922 the British Mandate of Palestine was established. In the 1922 census of Palestine conducted by the Mandate authorities, Majd al-Krum had a population of 889, of which 885 were Sunni Muslims, three were Shia Muslims and one was Christian. According to the diaries of a resident of the village, Mohammed Haidar, Majd al-Krum experienced a series of hardships, beginning on 23 February 1928, when an earthquake caused damage to the foundations and roofs to numerous houses in the village. The damage became apparent during the harsh winter of January 1929, which was characterized by heavy rains and severe flooding, when the second floors of over fifty homes at least partly collapsed. On 18 April 1930, a swarm of locusts swept the village. In the 1931 census, Majd al-Krum had 226 occupied houses and a population of 1,006 Muslims. In the 1945 statistics, Majd al-Krum had 1,400 inhabitants, all Muslims. They owned a total of 17,828 dunams of land, while 2,214 dunams were public property.

Before and during the Mandate period, agriculture was the mainstay of Majd al-Krum's economy. Its output was largely for subsistence use, providing for the needs of extended families and, to a lesser extent, traded for other goods or to pay taxes and debts. Farming methods remained the same as they had generations prior, with cattle or donkey-pulled ploughs and manual tools. Nearly all households owned livestock, mostly cattle and goats, which provided for their domestic dairy needs, and chickens. At most, livestock was a source for supplementary income. Donkeys were raised in significant numbers for ploughing, while only few families owned horses. The lands lying west, south and southeast of the town were arable when tilled and terraced, while the hilly areas to the north were not cultivable. Of the 17,754 dunams the residents owned in 1945, 46.7% were cultivated, a high rate relative to the villages of the Shaghur valley, where cultivation was limited by the rocky hills and deep ravines surrounding the valley. About 72% of these lands were planted with grains, particularly wheat, barley, lentils, chickpeas and sesame. The Mandate authorities provided tax relief for most of the grain fields due to their generally poor output. Closer to the village houses, the inhabitants maintained vegetable gardens for domestic use.

Orchards, mainly olives, comprised 28% of the farmlands and were significant to the village economy, but to a lesser extent than the neighboring villages, with olive groves occupying a relatively small share of Majd al-Krum's lands. Olives were harvested mainly for subsistence use and part of a cottage industry; the residents cracked the olives with stones, boiled them in water, and separated and collected the olive oil as it rose to the surface. Most households made their own olive oil soap and used the olive pits as fuel for their tabun ovens. Unlike other villages in the Shaghur valley, Majd al-Krum was well known for its dates, which were partly marketed in the Galilee's cities. According to historian Aziz Haidar, the dates "were among the finest in the country". Many of Majd al-Krum's residents, including entire families, found seasonal employment during the olive harvests in Rameh and Maghar and the grain harvests in Sha'ab, Damun and Shefa-Amr and, in some cases, Syria's southern Hauran region, where families would take up temporary residence.

Majd al-Krum had little commercial activity during the Mandate period, limited to three small general stores by the end of the Mandate in 1948. Several villagers owned camels and were employed to transport goods across Palestine and to and from Beirut and the Syrian cities of Damascus, Aleppo and Homs. A number of the cameleers engaged in commerce of their own in the village. In the early 1930s, people in Majd al-Krum increasingly found work in the Port of Haifa and Haifa's tobacco factories (forty households from the village moved to Haifa when their heads gained employment in the tobacco factories). A few villagers became police officers there and in Acre. By the mid-1930s and especially during World War II, many young men from Majd al-Krum worked transport jobs in British military installations in and around Haifa and Acre, where incomes were twice as high as in the tobacco factories. Wage labor in the Haifa region had thus become a primary source of income for several families in Majd al-Krum.

==== 1936–1939 revolt ====
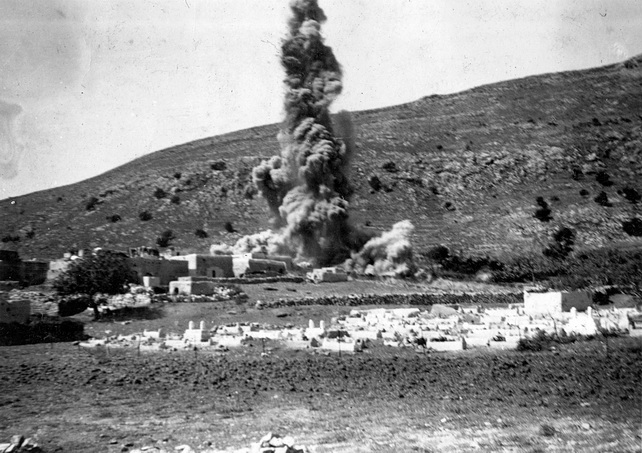
A house in Majd al-Krum blown up by the British in 1936, during the revolt in Palestine. The village cemetery in the foreground

During the 1936–1939 Arab revolt against British rule and increased Jewish settlement in Palestine, Majd al-Krum was one of the first villages in the Galilee to participate in the revolt. A resident, Abu Faris, claimed he was the first individual to take up arms in the Galilee during the revolt and the first to have his house demolished by the British as punishment for his participation. (Note: Abu Faris claims to have become the second-in-command of the revolt in the Galilee until 1938 when he refused an order to assassinate a Palestinian Arab supporter of the Peel Commission partition plan for Palestine into Jewish and Arab states. Abu Faris later left Palestine for Lebanon after a major political leader of the revolt, Amin al-Husayni, ordered his assassination. He later settled in Kafr Yasif, possibly to avoid punishment for his alleged killing of a man in Majd al-Krum before the 1936 revolt.) The British blew up a number of homes in Majd al-Krum during the revolt as a punitive measure, including the home of Hussein Abu Ramhin.

On 11 March 1938, British forces surrounded a house in Majd al-Krum in an attempt to capture a fighter, Rashid Abd Salim Manna; the latter escaped but his brother Shakir was shot and killed. Fighters from the village later fought the British at Yarka, on 22 December 1938, where two cousins from Majd al-Krum, Ahmad Hussein Bishr and Kamil Hamad Bishr, were slain. The last battle in which Majd al-Krum's fighters participated was in the Layyat plain west of the village on 19 July 1939, which ended with eight Arab fighters slain.

=== Israel ===
==== Capitulation to the Israeli army ====
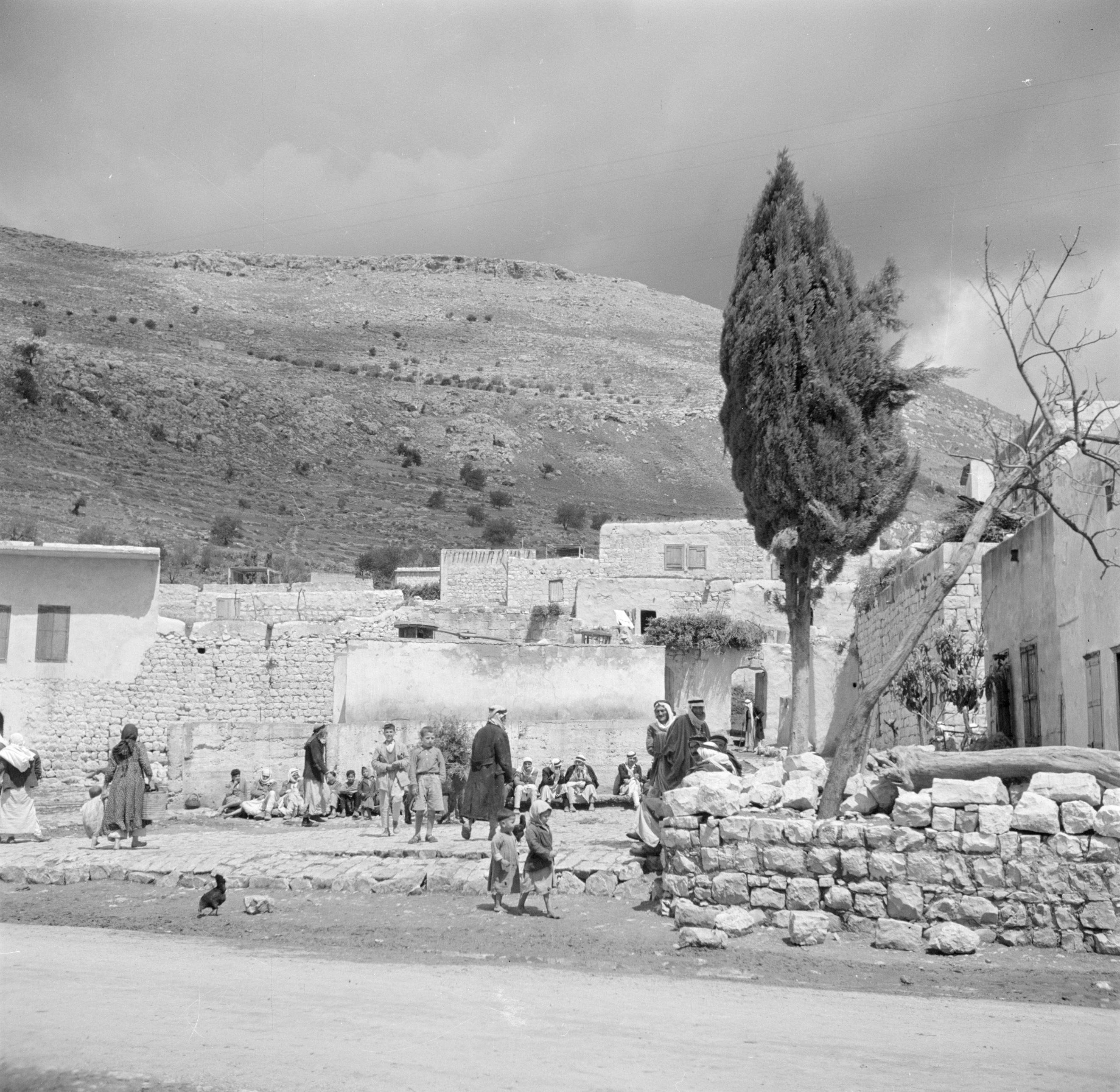
Al-Ayn, the village square of Majd al-Krum, soon after the village was captured by Israeli forces, 1948–1949

During the 1948 Palestine war, a unit of the Arab Liberation Army (ALA) was stationed in Majd al-Krum, with its command headquartered in the village's former British police station. The ALA and local youths from Majd al-Krum and the surrounding villages fought skirmishes with the Israelis following the second ceasefire of the war. The ALA fighters assisted the residents with harvesting and planting their seasonal crops and the residents provided them with food and shelter in return. The secretary of the local committee that coordinated affairs in the village with the ALA was Khaled Dhiyab Farhat. The sheikhs or mukhtars (headmen) of Majd al-Krum's three quarters at that time were Hajj Abd Salim Manna, Dhiyab Qasim Farhat and Hasan Sarhan.

On 29 October 1948, amid the Israeli offensive codenamed Operation Hiram, the Iraqi commander of the ALA unit notified the residents of Majd al-Krum of the unit's imminent withdrawal to Lebanon. He advised them to negotiate a surrender agreement with the Israelis to avoid their potential expulsion and the destruction of their village. Many youths who had volunteered with the ALA took refuge in the mountains north of Majd al-Krum and other villagers withdrew with the ALA toward Lebanon. Most of Majd al-Krum's inhabitants remained and the village also hosted refugees from the nearby villages of Sha'ab, Damun and Birwa.

A delegation from Majd al-Krum soon after met with leaders of the Druze Ma'di family of Yarka, led by Jabr Dahesh Ma'di, who had mediated the peaceful surrender of other villages in the western Galilee. (Note: The members of the delegation were mukhtar Dhiyab Qasim Farhat, Tawfiq al-Jabr, future mayor Ali al-Mansur and Muhammad Haydar (Abu Jamil; Haydar kept a regular log of events in Majd al-Krum, from weddings and funerals to local news and his diaries were used as a source by historian Adel Manna.) In Yarka, contact was made with Haim Auerbach, an Israeli intelligence officer based in Nahariya, who years earlier had been protected by men from Majd al-Krum from an attack against him near Acre. (Note: During the Mandate period, Auerbach and a number of young men from Majd al-Krum and other villages worked in a British military installation. A violent dispute occurred between Auerbach and men from Amqa, wherein the young men of Majd al-Krum intervened to protect Auerbach. Among those men was Muhyi al-Din Sa'id Manna (Abu Sa'id), who in 1949 was personally saved from expulsion by Auerbach.) Auerbach arranged for Majd al-Krum's notables to enter a surrender agreement with the Israeli army, which was signed in the Izzat Cafe at al-Ayn, the village square, on 30 October. Subsequently that day, Israeli forces from the 122nd and 123rd companies of the 9th Brigade collected thirty-five rifles and ammunition from the village.

==== November massacre ====
In early November, an Israeli intelligence directive was circulated recommending Majd al-Krum and the surrounding villages be combed for leftover weapons and volunteers who had allied with the ALA. On 5 November, an Israeli Army unit entered the village, assembled the men in al-Ayn square and ordered the residents to hand over their alleged weapons within the hour or one young man would be executed every half hour until the weapons were surrendered, despite the agreement and weapons handover which had occurred the previous week. The commanding officer dispatched another group of soldiers to search houses for weapons or young men who had not reported to the village square. At the end of the deadline, five of the assembled men were successively executed in the square. (Note: The first man killed was Abu Ma'yuf Muhammad al-Hajj Karim Manna of Majd al-Krum. The others killed included Muhammad Kayyal and Ibrahim al-Najm of Birwa and Muhammad Ahmad al-Arabi of Sha'ab.)

Elsewhere, two men from Sha'ab visiting relatives in Majd al-Krum were taken into custody by Israeli soldiers and executed in an olive grove and two women were shot dead in an Israeli house raid. Three more men were lined up in the village square, but before they were executed, (Note: The three men were one of the village mukhtars (headmen), Hajj Abd Salim Manna, resident Ahmad Dhiyab, and Mustafa Najm from Birwa.) Auerbach and a Palestinian informant from Damun, Shafiq Abu Abdu Buqa'i, arrived in the village, informed the commanding officer of the previous surrender agreement, and halted the executions.

Reports of the killings in Majd al-Krum and other villages of the Shaghur valley reached the United Nations observers docked in Haifa's harbor and within a few days a UN investigative team visited the village. The army denied carrying out any killings in Majd al-Krum and claimed they were rumors spread by the residents. In 1951, the residents of Majd al-Krum led by mukhtars Farhat and Manna and represented by attorney Muhammad Nimr al-Hawari testified to Israel's High Court in 1951 about the killings as part of a wider case concerning returning refugees from Majd al-Krum. The court accepted the credibility of the mukhtars' testimonies and determined that a "retaliatory military operation" was carried out in Majd al-Krum on 6 November.

==== Expulsion and return ====
According to Yiftachel, Majd al-Krum "experienced tremendous upheaval" during the 1948 war, with about half of its inhabitants becoming refugees in Lebanon while becoming home to about 300 people from nearby villages, mainly Sha'ab, Damun and Birwa. On 12–14 December 1948, the authorities registered the residents of Majd al-Krum and distributed registration documents to them in the following month. During the interim period, two operations were carried out on 9 January and 14 January, by the army to expel people they classified as "infiltrators". According to Manna, these included young men who had returned to Majd al-Krum after its capitulation, many of whom were legally registered as residents in December, and refugees from neighboring villages who the authorities sought to expel to prevent from returning to their places of origin. The sweeps resulted in the expulsion of 536 people from Majd al-Krum, including several internally displaced refugees from Sha'ab, Birwa and Damun. Most of the residents of nearby Sha'ab had settled in Majd al-Krum as a result of the war, some permanently and others temporarily.

The expellees were taken by the authorities to the Wadi Ara area, from which they crossed into the West Bank, where they took temporary refuge in Ein Beit al-Ma camp, before crossing into Jordan and from there to Syria then Lebanon. According to Manna, the expulsions of January "emptied the village of most of its young men" (with their wives and children, if any). At the same time, the authorities had chosen Majd al-Krum as a place to "absorb" refugees from other villages, "in order to gain control of the land" of those villages. Many of the refugees of Majd al-Krum settled in the Shatila camp outside of Beirut. A former fighter from the village, Abed Hussein Bishr, founded the camp on a small plot of land he leased from its Lebanese namesake, Shatila, and gathered other refugees from Majd al-Krum to settle there. According to historian Julie Peteet, the role of Majd al-Krum and its refugees "was foundational" in Shatila's establishment.

Several expelled residents attempted to return to Majd al-Krum between 1949 and the early to mid-1950s, some crossing back through the more arduous paths in the mountains and others by the more expensive but less dangerous route by sea from Ras Naqoura to the coastal plain of Acre. On 6 November 1949, the authorities expelled 250 to 260 villagers to the West Bank; some, particularly young bachelors, crossed back into Israel and returned to Majd al-Krum, while most families eventually made their way to the camps in Lebanon. As a result of High Court cases brought by the residents of Majd al-Krum, represented either by Hanna Naqqara or Muhammad Nimr al-Hawari, between 1951 and 1953, several hundred managed to return, particularly those who were expelled in January 1949 or were otherwise registered in December 1948 but had not received their registration cards; those who had taken refuge in Lebanon around the time of Majd al-Krum's capitulation or before the December census were largely unsuccessful in their court cases and remained in Lebanon. Individual cases continued to be lodged with the High Court into the mid-1950s and largely ended afterward, while military combing operations to deport 'infiltrators' largely ceased by then as well.

==== Land expropriation ====
Before the 1948 war, Majd al-Krum's land area consisted of 20,065 dunams (20.07 hectares), 69% of which was expropriated by the Israeli state between 1948 and the mid-1970s. The majority of the land was expropriated on the basis of the 1949 Absentees' Property Law from refugees who fled during the war, the remainder for "public purposes" or on the basis of lacking formal title (communal land as designated by Ottoman-era land laws).

Jurisdiction over expropriated lands subsequently came under the Israel Land Authority (ILA), which, because of a 1960 law prohibiting the sale of state lands, began a process of land exchange with Majd al-Krum's remaining inhabitants. Accordingly, many residents of Majd al-Krum exchanged agricultural land they owned for expropriated land within the village proper, i.e. areas designated for residential use, in lieu of purchasing lands expropriated from the village. The typical exchange rate entailed the residents' transfer of five dunams of their agricultural lands for one dunam of land within the residential areas of the village, and the ILA would normally keep a 10–25% ownership stake in the residential parcel. The ILA minority ownership stake was not explicitly marked in surveys, thus guaranteeing the ILA control over the residents' right to build on their newly acquired parcels. The process of land exchange was particularly active between 1965 and 1980, during which 15,860 dunams were transferred to the ILA in exchange for 3,010 dunams transferred to Majd al-Krum's residents.

In 1964 about 5,100 dunams of land were expropriated by the state for the construction of the Jewish town of Karmiel, whose establishment was declared as an effort to Judaize the Galilee by Israeli Prime Minister Levi Eshkol. In 1966, efforts for a master plan began and were completed in 1978. However, the master plan was not approved by the authorities and while the population grew from 4,000 to 6,700 between 1966 and 1990, no new land was allocated to Majd al-Krum to cope with population growth. Beginning in the 1970s, the Jewish Agency launched efforts to build around sixty small Jewish communities, then known as mitzpim (observation points), in between Arab villages in the Galilee to monitor and check Arab building activity. Among these Jewish communities were Lavon, Tuval, Gilon and Tzurit, which all border Majd al-Krum.

Several hundred residents of Majd al-Krum took part in the Land Day demonstrations of 1976, which protested another round of the state's expropriation of Arab-owned land, in which 2,100 dunams from Majd al-Krum were transferred to expand Karmiel. Six Arab protesters were killed in nearby Arab towns and since then, mass expropriation of Arab-owned land by the state has virtually ended.

==== 1977 protests ====
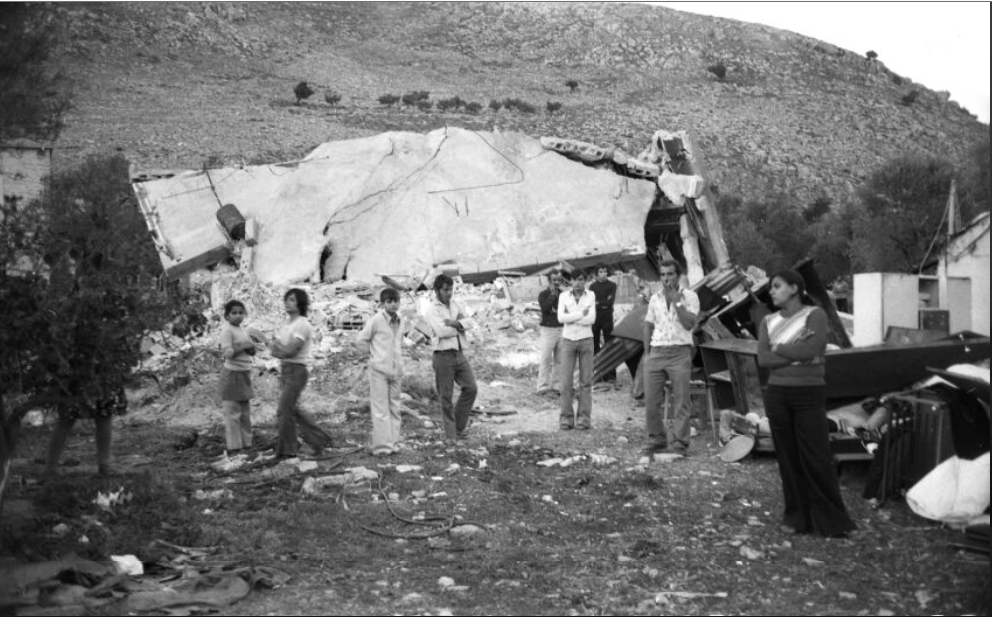
Residents of Majd al-Krum gathered at the house demolished by the authorities, 1977

On 8 November 1977, the government demolished a house in the village, near the Safed-Acre road, under a large police and Border Police escort. The house belonged to Hussein Kiwan, a paralytic father of seven, and was built without a permit in 1972. The local council of Majd al-Krum claimed the village's lack of land and the consistent refusals by the state to enlarge its municipal area had resulted in many residents disregarding planning regulations. Kiwan was clubbed by the police for not cooperating and severely injured, while the mayor, Nur Uthman, was escorted away by the authorities when he attempted to prevent the order. After the house was demolished, residents protested and were cleared by the police, who shot and killed a resident, 28-year-old father of five Ahmad Ali Masri. By the end of the clashes, at least 12 residents were wounded and 29 arrested while 22 policemen were injured. The police had also raided around 20 homes. On the following day, the villagers held a strike demanding the release of the detainees and an official investigation of police conduct.

On 12 November, Arab local council heads declared a day of protest in Nazareth and ordered a general strike in the Arab sector to coincide with fortieth day of Masri's death. The incident prompted former mayor Muhammad Manna to leave the Labor Party and join Hadash. Manna was subsequently elected in 1986. Tawfiq Ziad, a member of the Knesset, declared "as long as there are stones in the Galilee, we shall use them to stone those who try to destroy our homes." The protest and the response of the state led to more assertive opposition by Israel's Arab community toward state policies.

==== 21st century ====
During the 2006 Lebanon War, over 40 Katyusha rockets landed in the vicinity of Shaghur, with the nearby city of Karmiel being the apparent target. Two men from Majd al-Krum, Baha Karim and Muhammad Subhi Manna, were killed when a rocket struck near them.

In October 2019, three young men, brothers Ahmed and Khalil Manna and Mohammed Sabaa, were killed in a shootout in Majd al-Krum, prompting large-scale protests and a general strike by the Arab community. Thousands attended the protest in Majd al-Krum, demanding government action against rising crime and the proliferation of firearms in Arab communities.

During the 2023-24 Israel-Hezbollah conflict, Majd al-Krum was affected by a Hezbollah rocket attack. On October 25, 2024, two residents, Hassan Suad (21) and Arjwan Manna (19), were killed when salvo of approximately 30 rockets fired by Hezbollah struck the area. Hezbollah later claimed responsibility for the attack, stating it targeted the city of Karmiel, which is approximately 6 km to the southeast of Majd al-Krum.

In September 2026, a settlement outpost was established by settlers from the occupied West Bank on village lands, a significant portion of which is owned by local residents. The Popular Committee and the Local Council of Majd al-Krum rejected this action. Their joint statement indicated that this development coincides with expanding plans to advance Jewish settlement and demographic alteration in the Galilee.

== Demographics ==
Majd al-Krum's population in November 1948, shortly after it capitulated to Israel, was 1,840, rising to 2,020 by the following year. In the 1961 census, the population grew to 2,830. By 2002, Majd al-Krum had approximately 10,000 inhabitants, and in the latest census 2024, it had a population of 15,429. The inhabitants are Sunni Muslims. Among the largest families or clans of Majd al-Krum are the Manna, Sarhan, Farhat, Kan'aan, Kiwan, Khalaileh, Hammoud, Bishr, Jaber, Khatib, Salameh, Isma'il, Rifa'i and Zarqawi.

== Local government ==
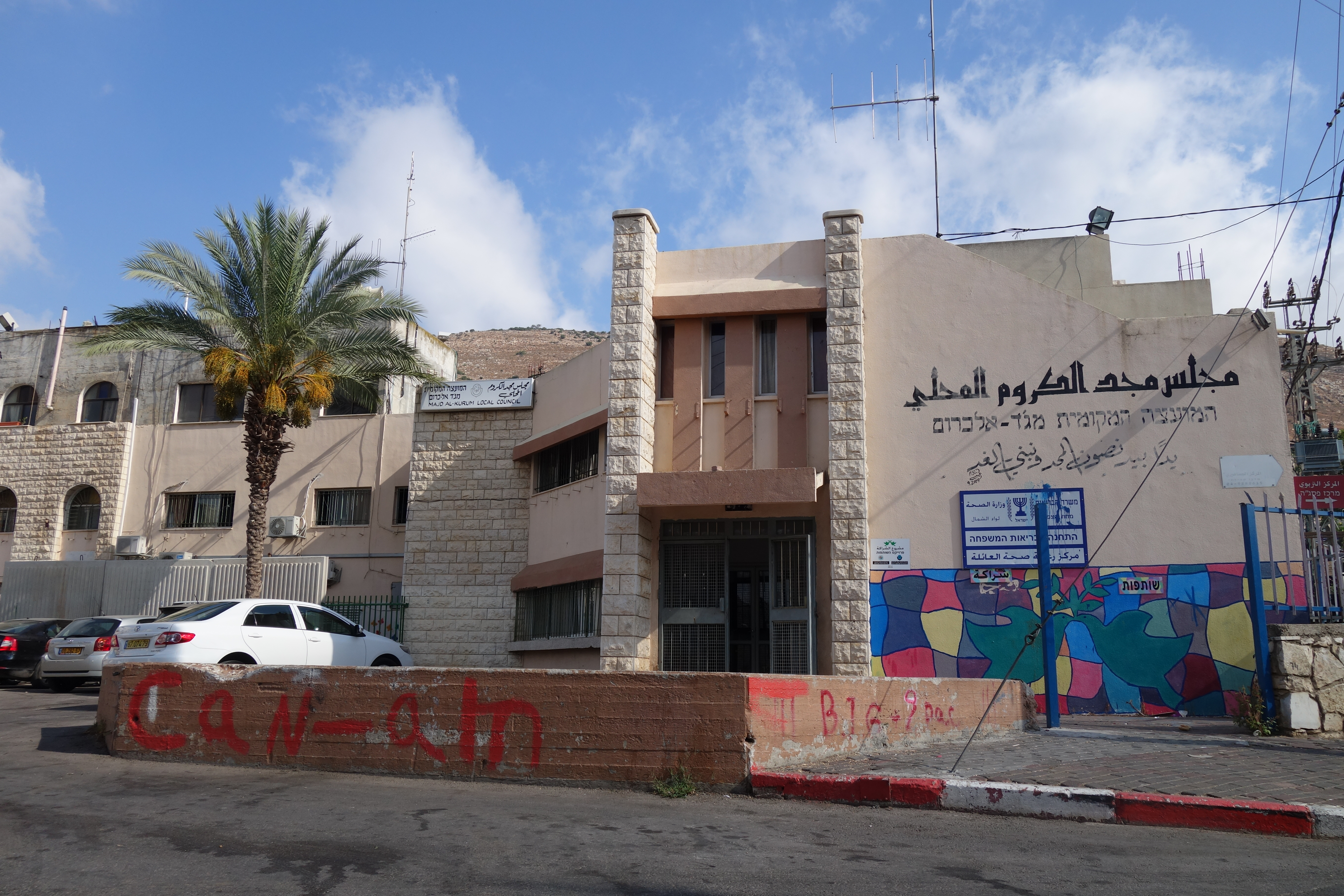
Local Council Headquarters of Majd al-Krum, 2016

Majd al-Krum was declared a local council in 1963 or 1964. The first mayor of Majd al-Krum was local leader Ali al-Mansur. Members of the council are elected and the council is responsible for basic municipal services, although local planning has remained in the jurisdiction of the Central Galilee Local Planning Committee appointed by the central government of Israel. In 2003 Majd al-Krum and the nearby local councils of Deir al-Asad and Bi'ina merged to form the city of Shaghur. Shaghur was dissolved in 2009.

== Economy ==
In the assessment of Haidar, writing in 1995, "[Economic] Development of Majd al-Krum was stifled by the expropriation of its resources, failure to allocate alternative resources, inadequate development of the infrastructure and basic services, and the legal constraints placed on industrial development." As a result, Majd al-Krum's income, goods and services were "almost absolute[ly]" derived from employment in the Jewish sector. Among the main sectors of Majd al-Krum's local economy were hill farming, cultivation of olives, spring and summer fruits, and vegetables, food processing and other factory industries, small workshops, and stone and marble quarrying.

=== Agriculture ===
The mass expropriations by the state after its establishment in 1948 ultimately left Majd al-Krum with about 4,500 dunams of land, one-third of which consisted of olive groves. A large proportion of the remaining lands were difficult to cultivate due to the rocky soil of the hillsides, lack of irrigation, and the parcelization of the lands into small and scattered plots. In the immediate period after 1948, the level lands of the valley and part of the hillside were cultivated with wheat, barley and chickpeas, and to a lesser extent, sorghum and sunflowers. Vegetables were mostly grown in the gardens closer to the villagers' residences, all for domestic use. During the 1950s, agriculture in the village became geared toward tobacco farming, which rapidly replaced the grain fields across Majd al-Krum's cultivated lands. These fields were largely worked by elderly men, women and children. The cultivation of tobacco dissipated when the country's tobacco companies abruptly stopped purchasing the village's crop in 1965.

Date farming also increased significantly in the 1950s, eventually becoming a leading crop in the village, due to demand from the beverage and preserves industries. Children and elderly men served as guards during the summer, while women were entrusted with the harvest. According to Haidar, "it seemed that the summer occupation of the entire village was harvesting and marketing dates" until the 1970s, when this sector gradually declined. Although olives continue to be cultivated, especially in the hilly parts of Majd al-Krum, historically the village's olives were generally of modest quality. Most of the olive oil extracted was and continues to be for household needs and sale is limited to the Arab sector of Israel, particularly within the village itself. Renewed interest in olive farming began in the late 1970s, due to the general belief by landowning residents that cultivating their lands would protect them from expropriation by the state and olives were a lower maintenance crop than grains. Higher quality varieties of olives were introduced, especially those that thrive in the rocky soil of the hills.

Agriculture in general became a marginal economic activity in the village by the 1970s, due to its unviable economics, the mass employment of working men in the Israeli labor market and youth's participation in the education system. Livestock raising correspondingly declined, with transport camels disappearing by the 1960s and only few families still raising cattle or sheep by the 1970s. By the early 1990s, Haidar estimated only 2.1% of workers in the village were engaged in agriculture, with only eleven households citing it as their sole source of income. Nevertheless, it remained important as a supplementary income for most families, with many still cultivating olives in particular.

=== Industry and commerce ===
In the early 1970s, workshops began to open in Majd al-Krum and by the early 1990s, nineteen were in operation, half of which were related to homebuilding, around one third were auto-related with the remainder including sewing and shoemaking shops and a plastics factory. The output of the workshops covered a small proportion of the village's demand, with most services and materials accessed outside of Majd al-Krum. Over four-fifths of those employed in manufacturing in the village earned most of their wages as laborers employed outside the village. The slow development of industry in Majd al-Krum was attributed by Haidar to a lack of capital and infrastructure and difficulty in acquiring permits and licenses from the state.

At the same time, there were little over fifty 'brick-and-mortar' commercial businesses in Majd al-Krum, with over two-thirds related to foodstuffs, many being general stores. Fifteen of the businesses were personal services, most being restaurants, entertainment or parlors. The businesses were mostly small-scale and secondary sources of income for their owners, with high turnover rates. According to Haidar, several factors, including the living standards of the village, limited market potential within the Israeli economy, and lack of investment capital constrained the growth of large-scale or specialized commercial enterprise in Majd al-Krum.

The headquarters of Moona, an NGO that works to integrate Israeli Arabs into the high tech industry, are located in Majd al-Krum.

=== Labor ===
In the early 1960s, 66% of the workforce in Majd al-Krum was employed in the Jewish sector. This share rose to 87% by the early 1990s, with skilled labor accounting for nearly half of the workforce. Public services, construction and industry together represented 70% of the employment sectors. Nearly four-fifths were employed as wage earners, with the rest being mostly self-employed or partly self-employed. Most employed men worked in construction and industry, while most working women were employed in education.

=== Transportation ===
In 2017, Israel Railways proposed building an additional train station at Majd al-Krum on the Railway to Karmiel.

== Voting Patterns ==
In the 2022 election, 98 percent of voters in Majd al-Krum voted for the Arab parties, while 1 percent voted for the parties of the center-left coalition led by Yair Lapid and 0.5 percent voted for the parties of the right-wing coalition led by Benjamin Netanyahu. Among the voters for the Arab parties, 47 percent voted for the Hadash–Ta'al list, while 42 percent voted for Balad and 11 percent voted for Ra'am.

In the 2026 election, 98 percent of voters in Majd al-Krum voted for the Arab parties, while 1 percent voted for the parties of the center-left coalition led by Gadi Eisenkot and 0.2 percent voted for the parties of the right-wing coalition led by Benjamin Netanyahu. Among the voters for the Arab parties, 88 percent voted for the Joint List, while 12 percent voted for Ra'am. Voter turnout increased 41 percent from the 2022 election.

== Notable people ==
- Adel Manna, historian and writer
- Ahmad Saba'a, former footballer
- Dia Saba, footballer, Israel national football team
- Haytham Dheeb, footballer, Palestine national football team
- Mohammed Kna'an, footballer, Israel national football team

== Bibliography ==
- Arafat, Jamil (2009). "Majd al-Krum: Pages from its Past". In Khalaila, Mohyi al-Din (ed.). Majd al-Krum: Museum and Open Book (in Arabic). Al-Manar Association for Development. pp. 17–23.
- Avi-Yonah, Michael (1976). "Gazetteer of Roman Palestine". Qedem. 5: 38. ISSN 0333-5844. JSTOR 43587090.
- Barbé, Hervé (2016). "Safed Castle and its Territory: Frankish Settlement and Colonisation in Eastern Upper Galilee during the Crusader Period". In Sinibaldi, Micaela; Lewis, Kevin J.; Balázs, Major; Thompson, Jennifer A. (eds.). Crusader Landscapes in the Medieval Levant: The Archaeology and History of the Latin East. Cardiff: University of Wales Press. pp. 55–80. ISBN 978-1-78316-924-5.
- Baroody, Laila, ed. (1979). The Arabs Under Israeli Occupation, 1977. Beirut: Institute for Palestine Studies.
- Barron, J.B., ed. (1923). Palestine: Report and General Abstracts of the Census of 1922. Government of Palestine.
- de Beugnot, Comte, ed. (1843). RHC Lois II (in French and Latin). Paris: R.H.C.
- Cohen, Amnon (1973). Palestine in the 18th Century: Patterns of Government and Administration. Jerusalem: The Magnes Press. ISBN 978-0-19-647903-3.
- Cohen, Hillel (2010). Good Arabs: The Israeli Security Agencies and the Israeli Arabs, 1948-1967. University of California Press. ISBN 9780520944886.
- Conder, C.R.; Kitchener, H.H. (1881). The Survey of Western Palestine: Memoirs of the Topography, Orography, Hydrography, and Archaeology. Vol. 1. London: Committee of the Palestine Exploration Fund.
- Dauphin, C. (1998). La Palestine byzantine, Peuplement et Populations. BAR International Series 726 (in French). Vol. III: Catalogue. Oxford: Archeopress. ISBN 0-860549-05-4.
- Frankel, Rafael (1988). "Topographical Notes on the Territory of Acre in the Crusader Period". Israel Exploration Journal. 38 (4): 249–272.
- Haidar, Aziz (1995). On the Margins: The Arab Population in the Israeli Economy. London: Hurst and Company. ISBN 978-1-8506-5174-1.
- Guérin, V. (1880). Description Géographique Historique et Archéologique de la Palestine (in French). Vol. 3: Galilee, pt. 1. Paris: L'Imprimerie Nationale.
- Hadawi, S. (1970). Village Statistics of 1945: A Classification of Land and Area ownership in Palestine. Palestine Liberation Organization Research Center.
- Heyd, Uriel (1960). Ottoman Documents on Palestine, 1552–1615. Oxford: Oxford University Press.
- Hütteroth, W.-D.; Abdulfattah, K. (1977). Historical Geography of Palestine, Transjordan and Southern Syria in the Late 16th Century. Erlanger Geographische Arbeiten, Sonderband 5. Erlangen, Germany: Vorstand der Fränkischen Geographischen Gesellschaft. ISBN 3-920405-41-2.
- Jacobs, Daniel (1998). Israel and the Palestinian territories. Rough Guides. ISBN 978-1-85828-248-0.
- Karmon, Y. (1960). "An Analysis of Jacotin's Map of Palestine" (PDF). Israel Exploration Journal. 10 (3 and 4): 155–173, 244–253. Archived from the original (PDF) on 2019-12-22.
- McDowall, David (1989). Palestine and Israel: The Uprising and Beyond. Berkely and Los Angeles: University of California Press. ISBN 0-520-06902-1.
- Manna, Adel (2022). Nakba and Survival The Story of Palestinians Who Remained in Haifa and the Galilee, 1948–1956. Oakland: University of California Press. ISBN 9780520389366.
- Manna, A. (Spring 2007). "From Seferberlik to the Nakba: A Personal Account of the Life of Zahra al-Ja'uniyya". Jerusalem Quarterly. 30: 59–76. doi:10.70190/jq.I30.p59.
- Mills, E., ed. (1932). Census of Palestine 1931. Population of Villages, Towns and Administrative Areas. Jerusalem: Government of Palestine.
- Orni, Efraim (2007). "Majd al-Kurūm". In Skolnik, Fred; Berenbaum, Michael (ed.). Encyclopaedia Judaica, Second Edition. Vol. 13, Lif–Mek. Thomson-Gale. p. 407. ISBN 0-02-865941-4.
- Palmer, E.H. (1881). The Survey of Western Palestine: Arabic and English Name Lists Collected During the Survey by Lieutenants Conder and Kitchener, R. E. Transliterated and Explained by E.H. Palmer. Committee of the Palestine Exploration Fund.
- Peteet, Julie (2011). Landscape of Hope and Despair: Palestinian Refugee Camps. University of Pennsylvania Press. ISBN 9780812200317.
- Rhode, H. (1979). Administration and Population of the Sancak of Safed in the Sixteenth Century (PhD). Columbia University. Archived from the original on 2020-03-01.
- Reiter, Y. (2009). National Minority, Regional Majority: Palestinian Arabs Versus Jews in Israel. New York: Syracuse University Press. ISBN 978-0-8156-3230-6.
- Richard, Jean (1979). The Latin Kingdom of Jerusalem, Volume 1. North-Holland Publishing Company. ISBN 0-444-85092-9.
- Röhricht, R. (1893). (RRH) Regesta regni Hierosolymitani (MXCVII-MCCXCI) (in Latin). Berlin: Libraria Academica Wageriana.
- Schumacher, G. (1888). "Population list of the Liwa of Akka". Quarterly Statement–Palestine Exploration Fund. 20: 169–191.
- Strehlke, E., ed. (1869). Tabulae Ordinis Theutonici ex tabularii regii Berolinensis codice potissimum. Berlin: Weidmanns.
- Smith, Eli (1841). "Lists of Arabic Names of Places in Palestine and the Adjacent Regions". In Robinson, E.; Smith, E. (eds.). Biblical Researches in Palestine, Mount Sinai and Arabia Petraea: A Journal of Travels in the year 1838. Vol. 3. Boston: Crocker & Brewster. pp. 112–196.
- Swedenburg, Ted (2003). Memories of Revolt: The 1936–1939 Rebellion and the Palestinian National Past. University of Arkansas Press. ISBN 1610752635.
- Thomson, William McClure (1882). The Land and the Book: Central Palestine and Phoenicia (Popular ed.). New York: Harper and Brothers.
- Yiftachel, O. (1995). "The Planning of Majd el Krum: The Practice of Control". Progress in Planning. 44 (2): 139–158. doi:10.1016/0305-9006(95)90165-5. ISSN 0305-9006. Archived from the original on 2016-04-09.
- Yiftachel, O. (1998). "The Internal Frontier: Territorial Control and Ethnic Relations in Israel". In Yiftachel, O.; Meir, Avinoam (eds.). Ethnic Frontiers and Peripheries: Landscapes of Development and Inequality in Israel. Westview Press. ISBN 0-8133-8929-1.
