= Katzir =

Place in Israel

Katzir: קָצִיר (Hebrew)
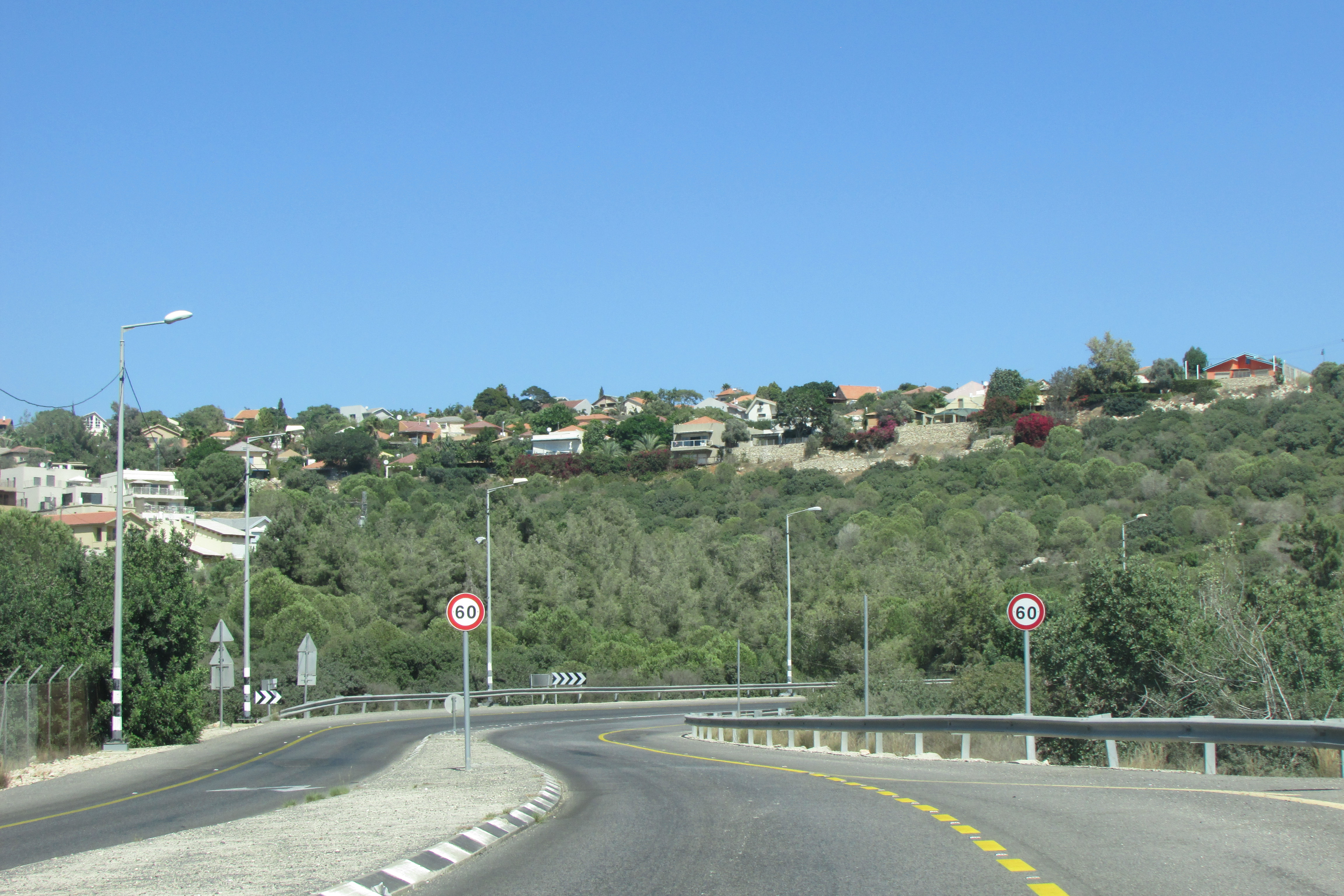

- Location within Haifa region of Israel Location within Israel
- Coordinates: 32°29′17″N 35°06′07″E
- Country: Israel
- District: Haifa
- Subdistrict: Hadera
- Council: Menashe
- Founded: 1982
- Founder: Hitahdut HaIkarim
- Population (2024): 2,629
- Website: vaad-katzir.org.il

Katzir (Hebrew: קָצִיר) is a community settlement in north-central Israel. Located southwest of Umm al-Fahm and close to the Green Line, it falls under the jurisdiction of Menashe Regional Council. In 2024 it had a population of 2,629.

== History ==
The village was established in 1982 by Hitahdut HaIkarim on land owned by the Jewish Agency, and was initially a community settlement. In 1993 it was merged with neighbouring Harish to form the Katzir-Harish local council. However, in 2012 the two were separated, with Harish remaining a local council and Katzir reverting to the jurisdiction of Menashe Regional Council.

== Geography and community ==
Katzir is situated on the Amir ridge south of the Iron Valley (Wadi Ara) at an elevation of approximately 400 meters above sea level. Built in a rural environment, it overlooks the coastal plain. The settlement spans three separate hills: the Western Hill, the Central Hill (built in the 1990s initially to accommodate immigrants from the former Soviet Union), and the Eastern Hill, which is under newer development. As of 2026, about 1,000 families reside in the community, and the village is often referred to as an "artists' village" due to its prominent local community of artists. In 2000, Katzir was the subject of the landmark High Court of Justice ruling (the Ka'adan case), which determined that non-Jewish citizens have the right to purchase land and reside in the community.

== Archaeology and tourism ==
On the western slope of the ridge lies El-Ahwat, an archaeological site discovered in 1992 by archaeologist Adam Zertal. Dated to the Late Bronze and Early Iron Ages, it features wavy stone walls resembling nuraghe structures found in Sardinia. This led Zertal to propose a connection between the site, the Shardana tribe of the Sea Peoples, and the biblical city of Harosheth Haggoyim. Another site on the Western Hill contains the remains of a Roman-era agricultural watchtower (shomera). The settlement features lookout points and the "Cliff Path" (Shvil HaMetzuk), which offers panoramic views of the coastal plain and the Mediterranean Sea. The area features rural lodging and attracts hikers.
