= Hitahdut HaIkarim =

Hitahdut HaIkarim (Hebrew: הִתְאַחֲדוּת האִכָּרים, lit. Farmers Federation) is a settlement movement for private farmers in Israel.

== History ==
Hitahdut HaMoshavot BeYehuda VeShomron (Hebrew: התאחדות המושבות ביהודה ושומרון, Association of moshavot in Judea and Samaria) was founded in Yavne'el in 1920, making it the oldest agricultural organisation in Israel. In 1927 it was expanded and renamed Hitahdut HaIkarim BeEretz Israel (Hebrew: התאחדות האיכרים בארץ ישראל, lit. Association of the Farmers in the Land of Israel). After Israeli independence it adopted its current name. The organisation was affiliated with the General Zionists, and later (as of 1985) with the Liberal Party. It published the weekly Bustenai periodical in conjunction with the General Zionists between 1929 and 1939.

Zionist leader Moshe Smilansky served as its president, whilst Haim Ariav, a General Zionists member of the Knesset, served as its secretary.

== Member villages ==
Several agricultural communities (moshavim and community settlements) are affiliated with the organisation, including:

- Adi, community settlement in northern Israel
- Bat Shlomo, moshav in northern Israel
- Elyashiv, moshav in central Israel
- Hararit, community settlement in Western Galilee
- Hibat Tzion, moshav in the central Coastal Plain
- Kamon, community settlement in the Galilee
- Katzir, Jewish locality in northern Israel
- Kidmat Tzvi, moshav in central Golan Heights
- Korazim, community settlement, Lower Galilee above the Sea of Galilee
- Mikhmanim, community settlement Lower Galilee
- Neve Michael, moshav in central Israel
- Talmei Bilu, moshav in north-western Negev
- Yuvalim, community settlement in the Galilee

== See also ==
- Agriculture in Israel
