= Giv'ot Eden =

Israeli community settlement

Giv'ot Eden: גבעות עדן (Hebrew)
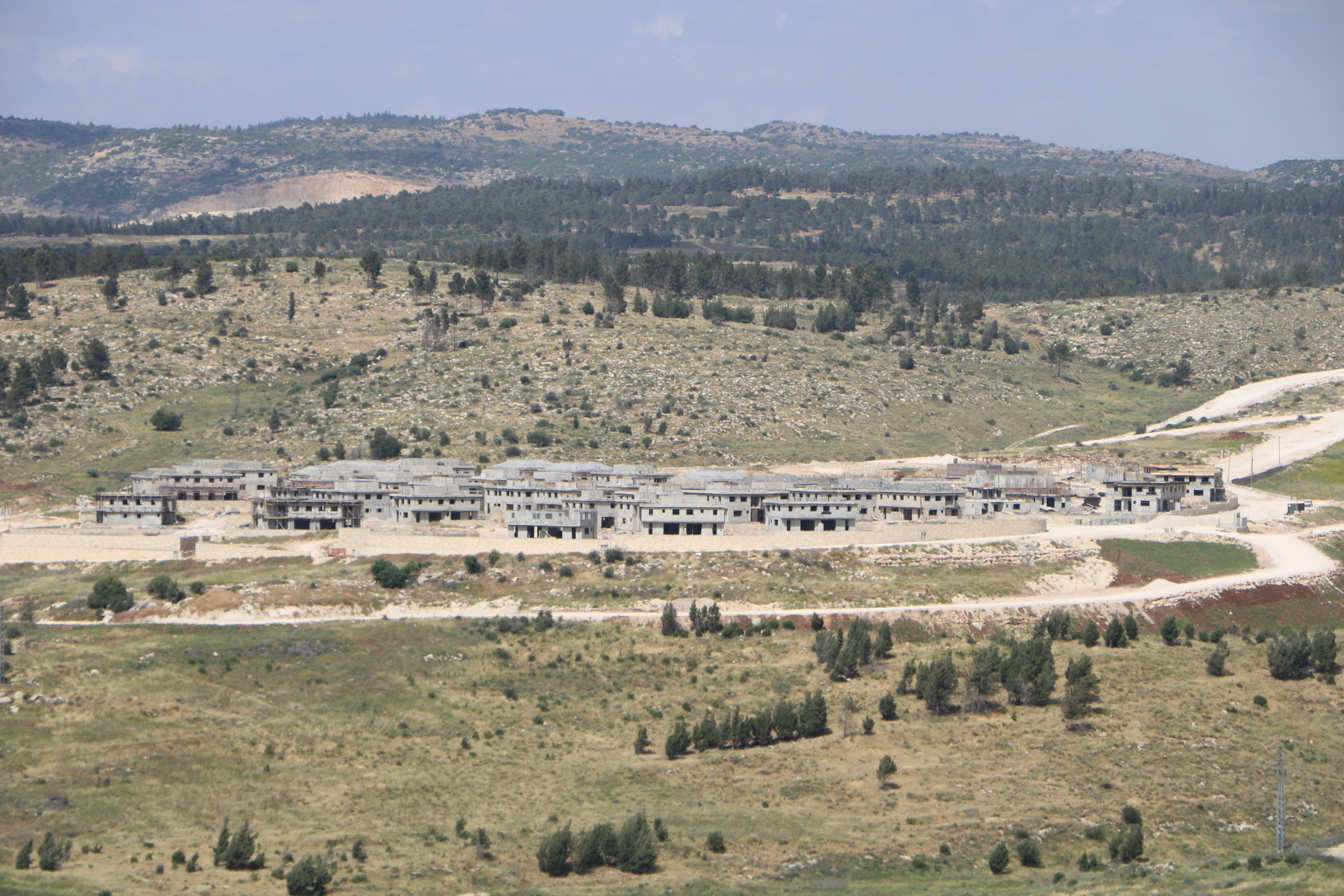
- Etymology: Eden Hills
- Location within Jerusalem District Location within Israel
- Coordinates: 31°39′44″N 35°00′46″E
- Country: Israel
- District: Jerusalem
- Council: Mateh Yehuda
- Founded: 2023
- Population (2024): 562

Giv'ot Eden (Hebrew: גבעות עדן, lit. 'Eden Hills'), also spelled Geva'ot Eden, is a community settlement in central Israel, officially designated as such in 2023. Located in the Judean Mountains, 41.7 kilometres (25.9 mi) southwest of Jerusalem, it falls under the jurisdiction of Mateh Yehuda Regional Council. In 2024 it had a population of 562. The settlement sits in the Judean foothills, and rests at an elevation of 379 metres (1,243 ft) above sea-level.

== History ==
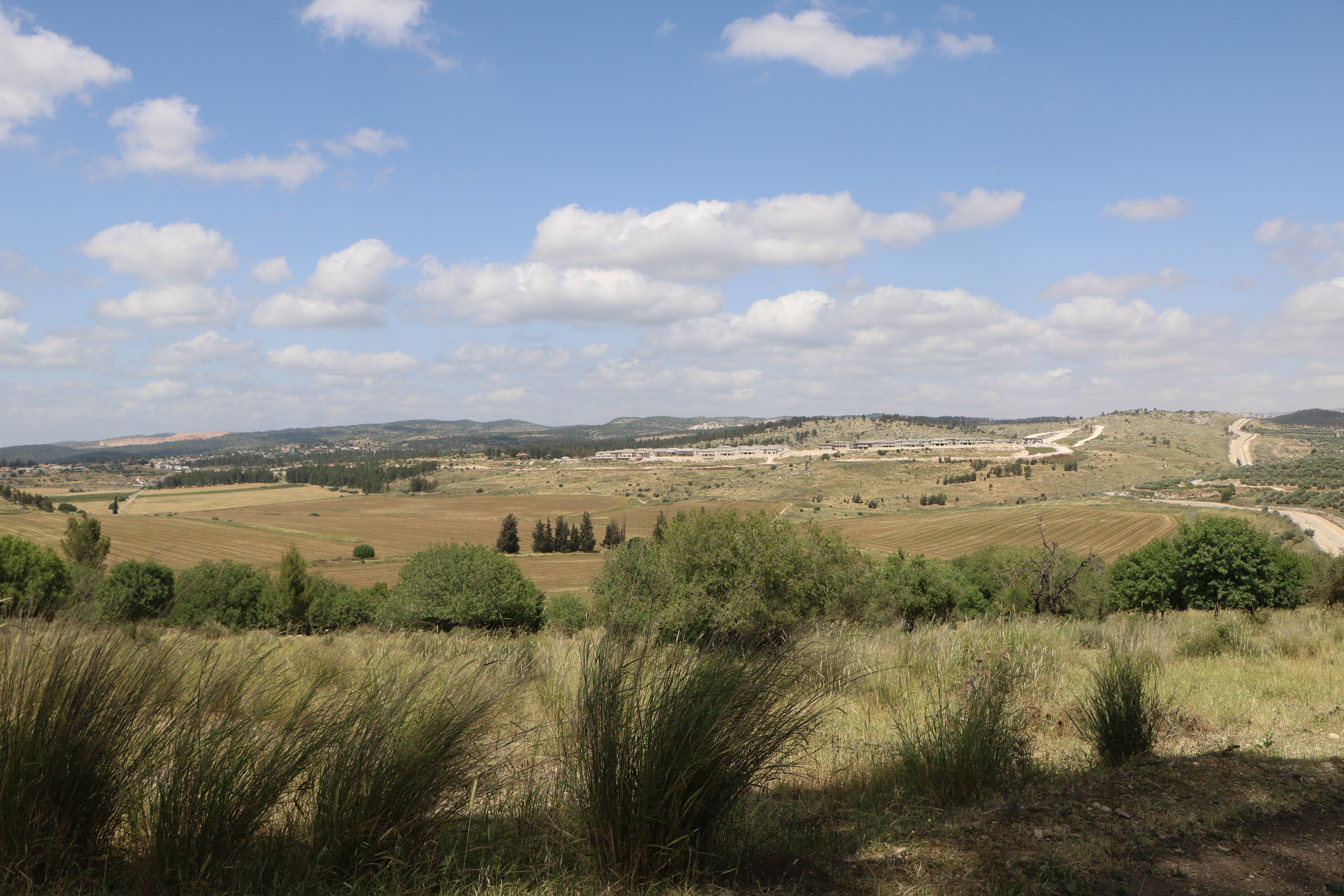
View of Giv'ot Eden

Prior to 1948, the territory was considered public lands owned by, both, Jews and Arabs living in Mandatory Palestine. Following the Armistice agreement of 1949 between Israel and Jordan, the land was officially recognized as territory falling under Israeli jurisdiction.

In 1997, the then Infrastructure Minister of Israel, Ariel Sharon, along with the Israel Land Administration, initiated the establishment of the settlement as part of a plan designed to increase the concentration of the Jewish population along the Green Line, similar to the Star Settlements plan initiated about ten years earlier. The plan was initially approved by the government in June of 1998.

The plan was promoted as an expansion of the Neve Michael settlement, and was intended to be called "Roglit B". In March 1999, the District Planning and Building Committee approved the plan for submission as a new neighborhood of Neve Michael. A representative of the Ministry of Environmental Protection opposed the plan, claiming that it contradicted the plan to establish a biosphere reserve in the entire area, which aimed to preserve landscape values and environmental quality and preserve ecological corridors.

In 2000, the National Planning and Building Council approved the establishment of a community settlement of 500 housing units on an area of approximately 1,000 dunams, with the possibility of expansion to 1,400 housing units. The suggested name of the community settlement went from Roglit B to Harei Eden to Giv'ot Eden, which last name was finally adopted. Part of the settlement area was established on agricultural land, which was used for field crops.
