= Neve Michael =

Moshav in central Israel

Neve Michael נְוֵה מִיכָאֵל
- Moshav
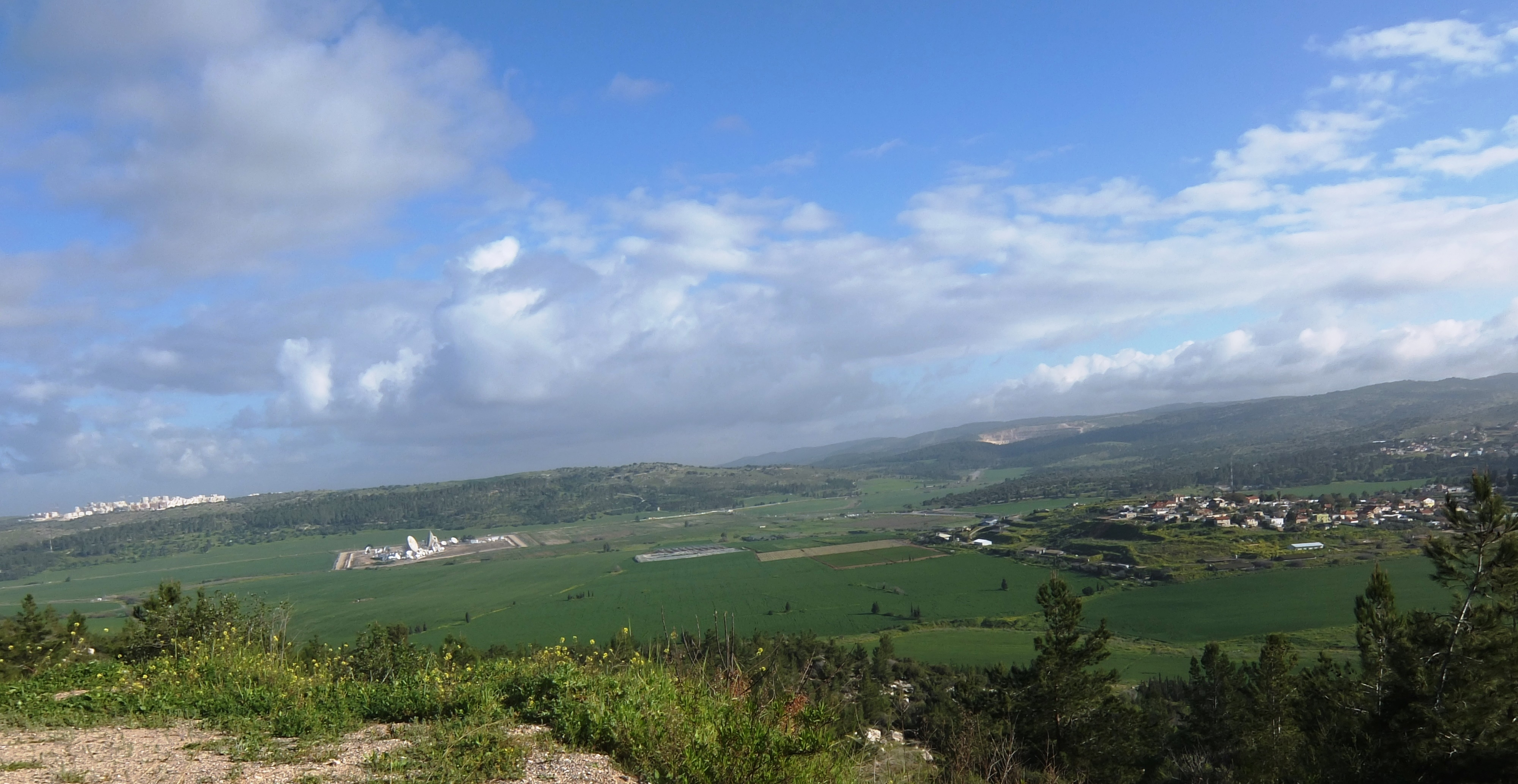
- Neve Michael from a hill overlooking the Elah Valley
- Etymology: "Michael's Haven"
- Interactive map of Neve Michael
- Location within Jerusalem District
- Coordinates: 31°40′22″N 35°0′22″E
- Country: Israel
- District: Jerusalem District
- Regional Council: Mateh Yehuda Regional Council
- Founded: 29 July 1958
- Founder: Kurdish Jews

Population
  - Total: 975

Neve Michael (Hebrew: נְוֵה מִיכָאֵל, lit. 'Michael's Haven') also known as Roglit, is a moshav in central Israel. Located in the Adullam region and built upon an eminence in the far south-east end of the Elah Valley, it falls under the jurisdiction of Mateh Yehuda Regional Council. In 2024 it had a population of 975.

== Background ==
=== Archaeology ===
Archaeological finds range from the Early Hellenistic period to the Umayyad period with evidence of a Jewish settlement in the first century CE.

Near the moshav are the ruins of Adullam and Hurvat Itri.

=== Arab village ===
The moshav was preceded by the Arab village of Bayt Nattif, which was depopulated during the 1948 Arab–Israeli War. The place where the moshav stands was known in the 19th century as Khirbet Jurfah.

== Moshav history ==
=== Roglit ===
The village of Roglit was established on 29 July 1958 (12 Av 5718 anno mundi) by a group of Jewish immigrants from Iranian Kurdistan, on farm land that had previously belonged to Bayt Nattif before the 1948 Arab-Israeli War. In 1958, the newly restructured Jewish National Fund (JNF), working in concert with the Hitahdut HaIkarim agricultural organisation, settled new immigrants on the site giving to the place the name Roglit (Hebrew: רוֹגְלִית), meaning "tiller [of the grapevine]". The new immigrants were initially employed as laborers for JNF land reclamation. The founders were joined by immigrants from North Africa, mainly Morocco.

An Israel Border Police outpost was also built in Neve Michael, which was later abandoned in 1962.

After the JNF-related years, the village economy was based on agriculture (citrus fruit) and poultry, which phased out in the late 1980s.

=== Neve Michael ===
A newer regional community center built alongside it was given the name Neve Michael, in memory of American philanthropist, Michael M. Weiss, who was a donor to the JNF. The newer section had a regional elementary school which catered to children from the surrounding communities of Roglit, Aderet and Aviezer, but closed its doors in the early 1980s. Today, the grounds of the old school serve as a home for the mentally and physically disabled.

=== 1983 merger; new Neve Michael ===
When the new settlement of Neve Michael failed to attract new residents, it was merged with Roglit in 1983.

In 2005 the village started an expansion plan attracting many younger families to the moshav. The moshav has a mixed population with people of different ages, ethnic background and Jewish religious observance.

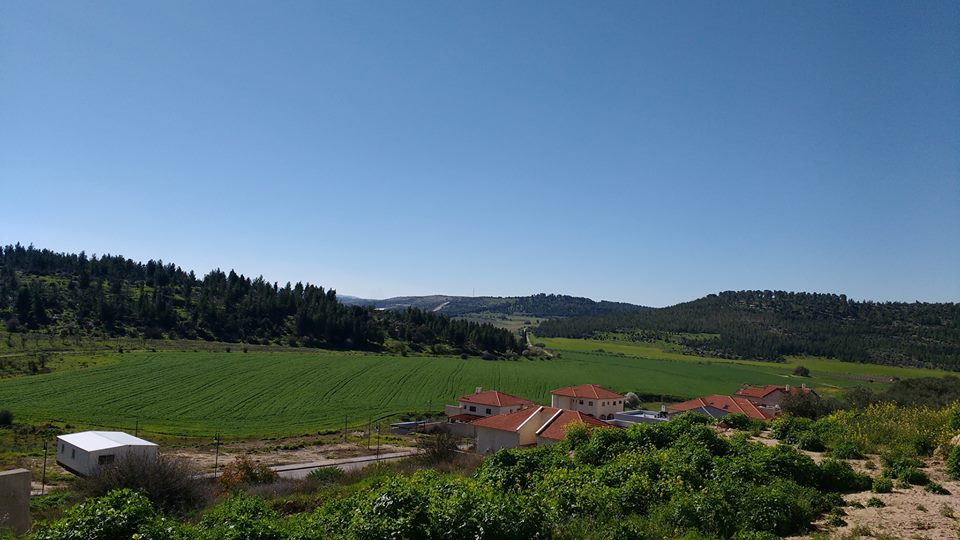
Green view from Neve Michael

== Gallery ==
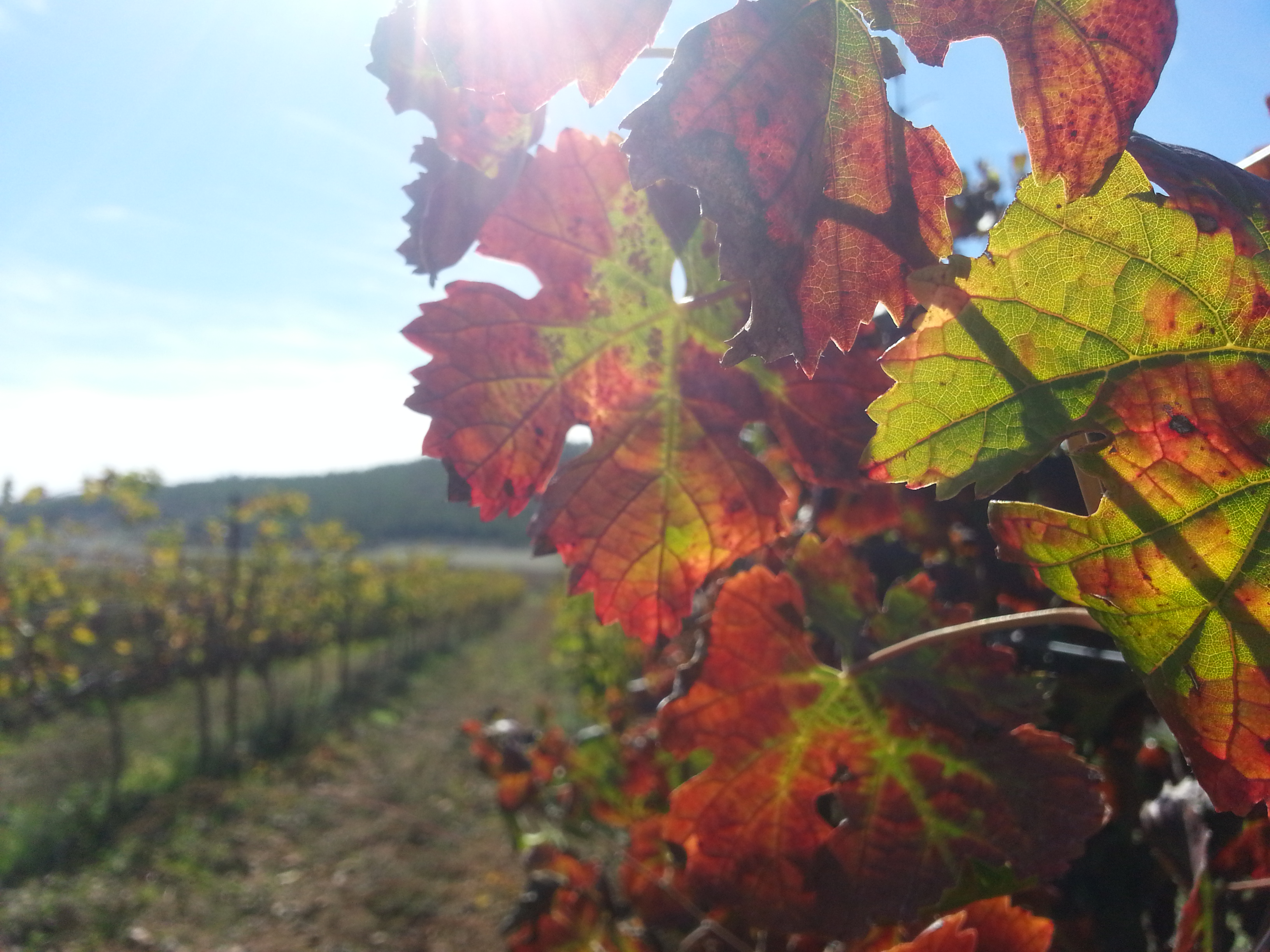
Vineyard at Neve Michael

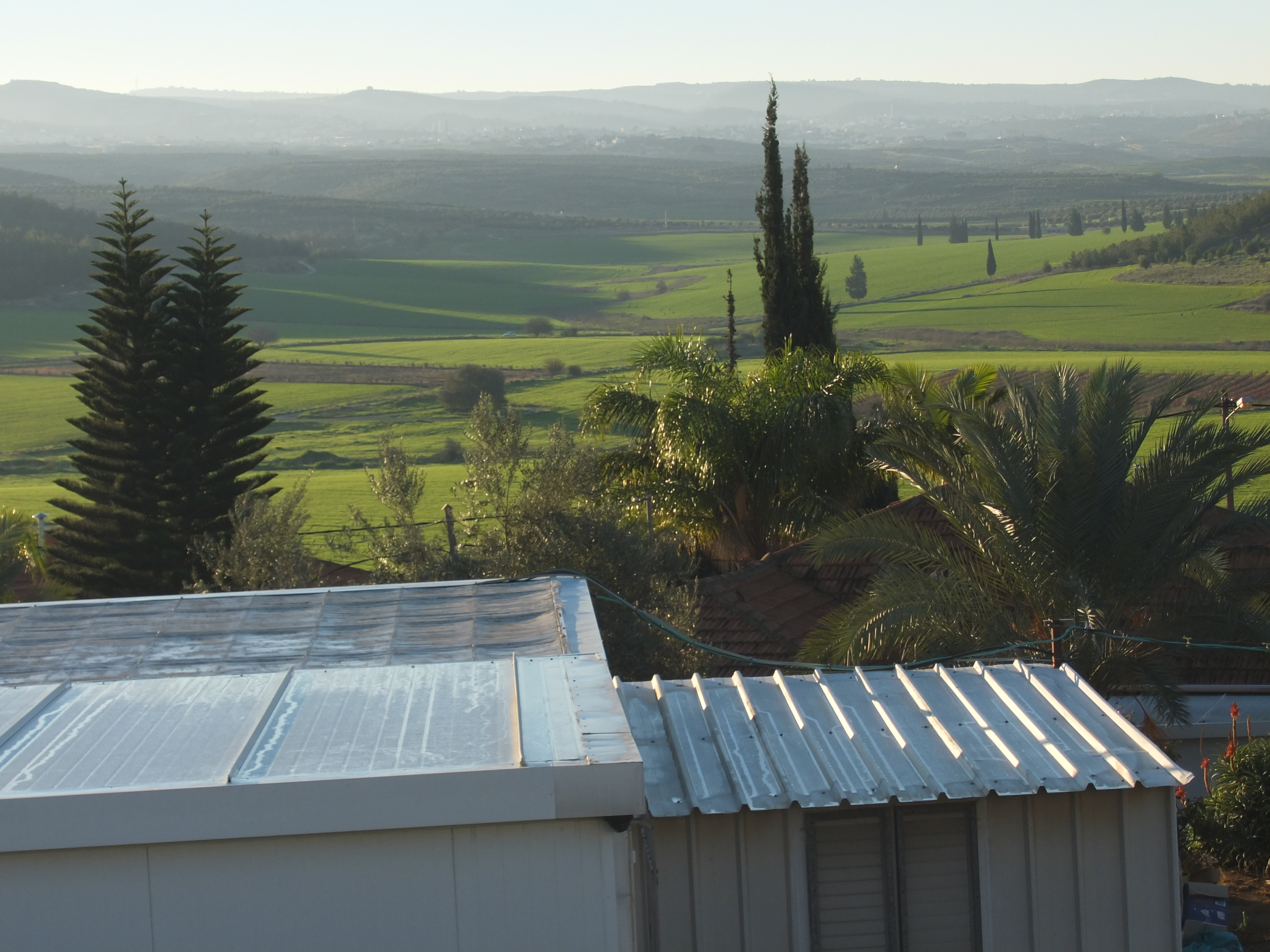
View of Valley from the Moshav

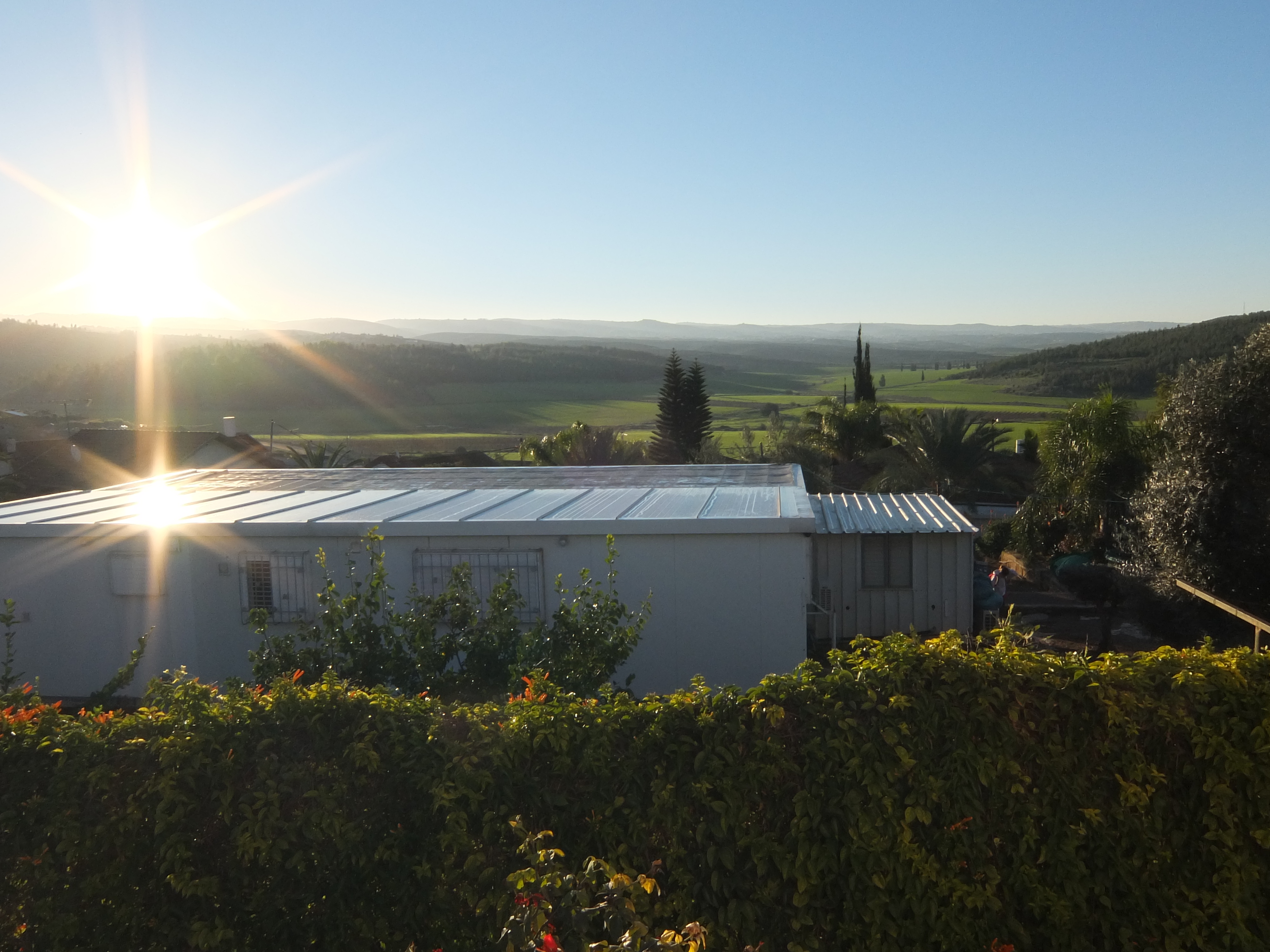
Sunrise over the Elah Valley

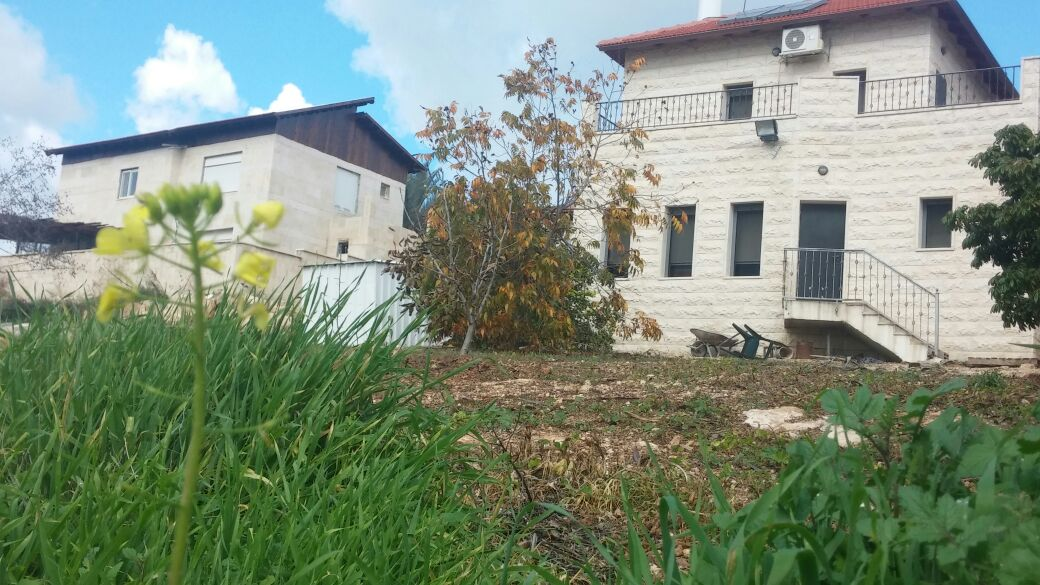
Houses in Neve Michael

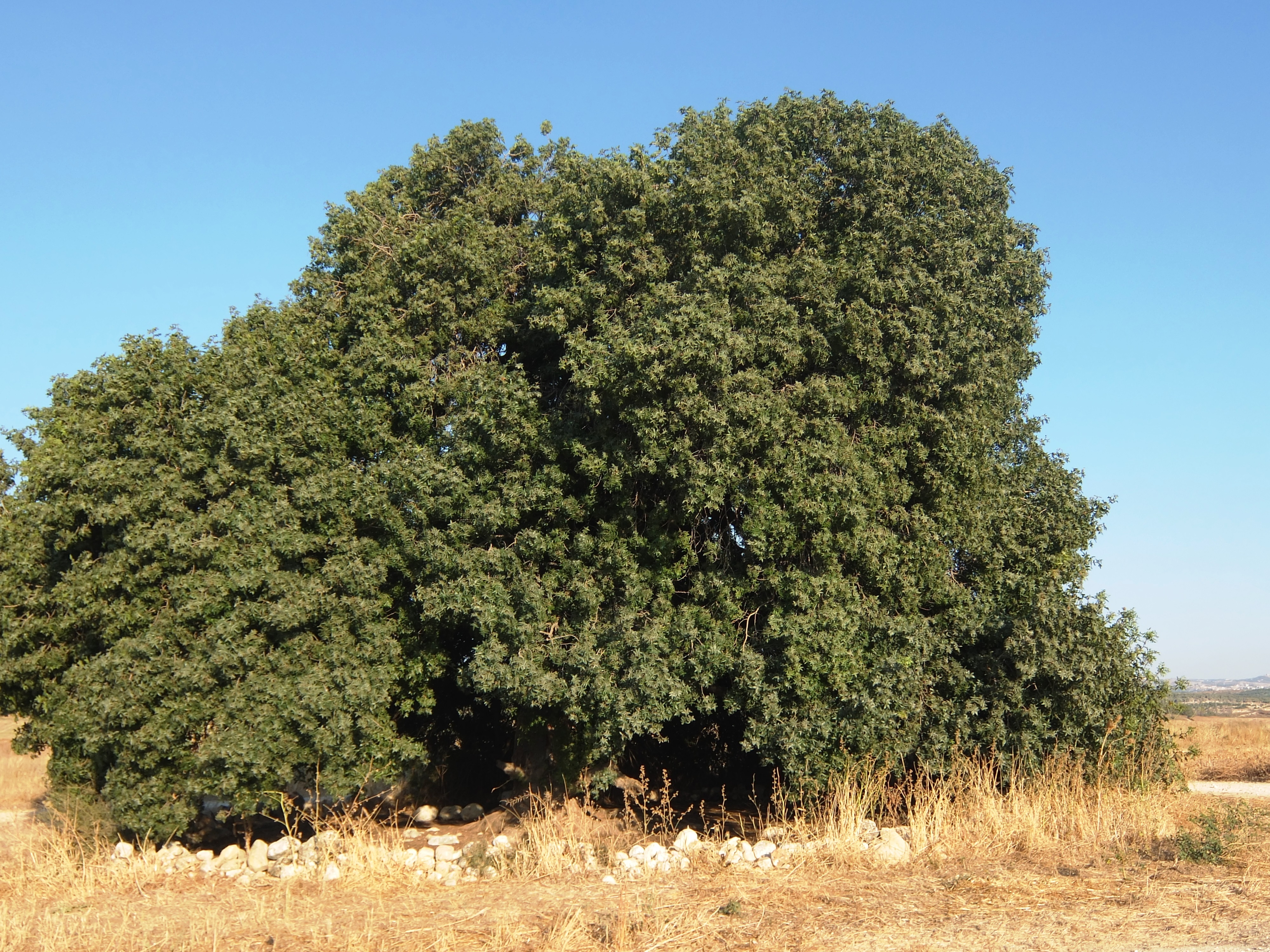
Terebinth tree (Pistacia atlantica) in the Elah valley, on south side of Neve Michael

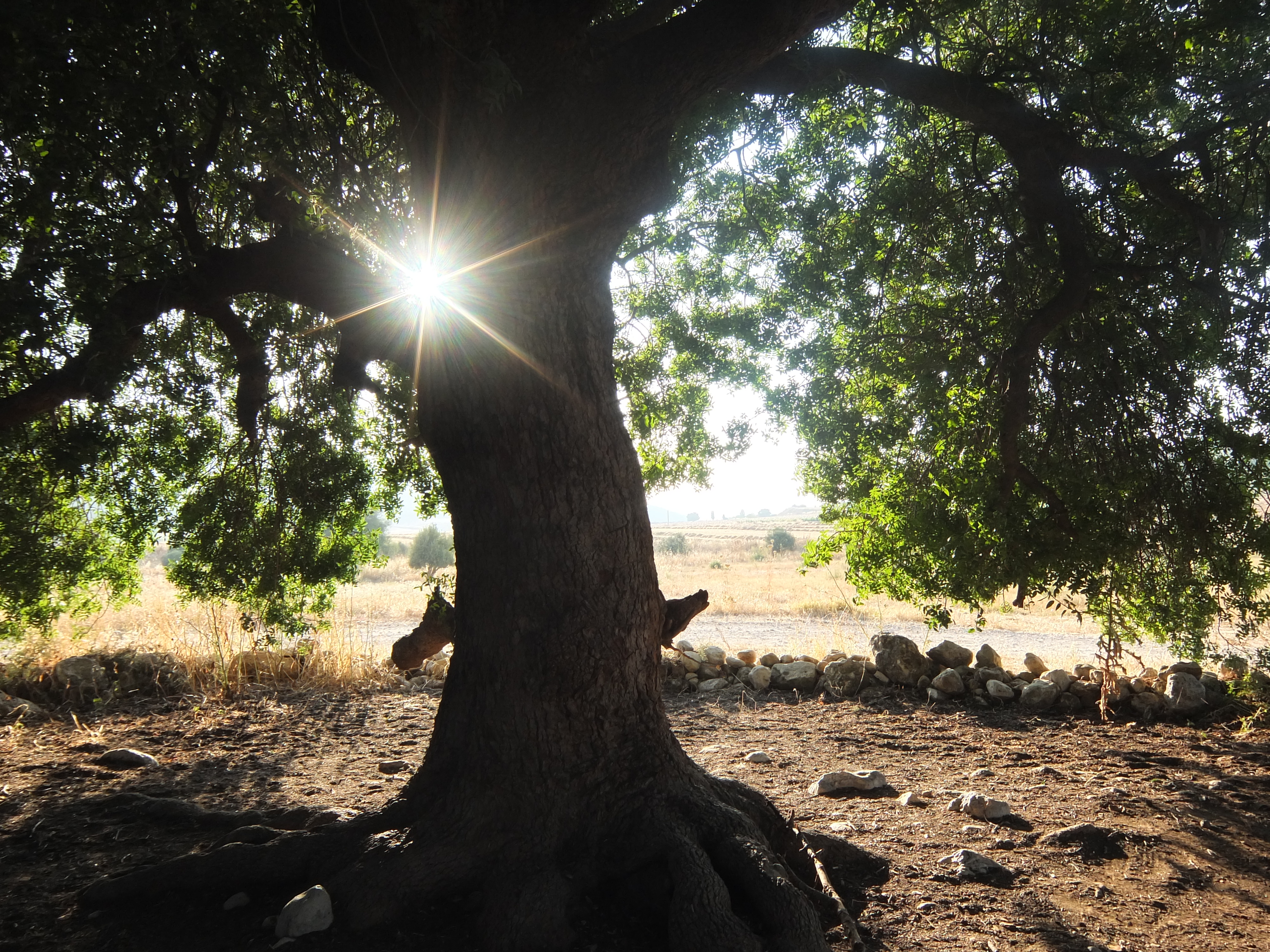
Beneath the shady boughs of a terebinth

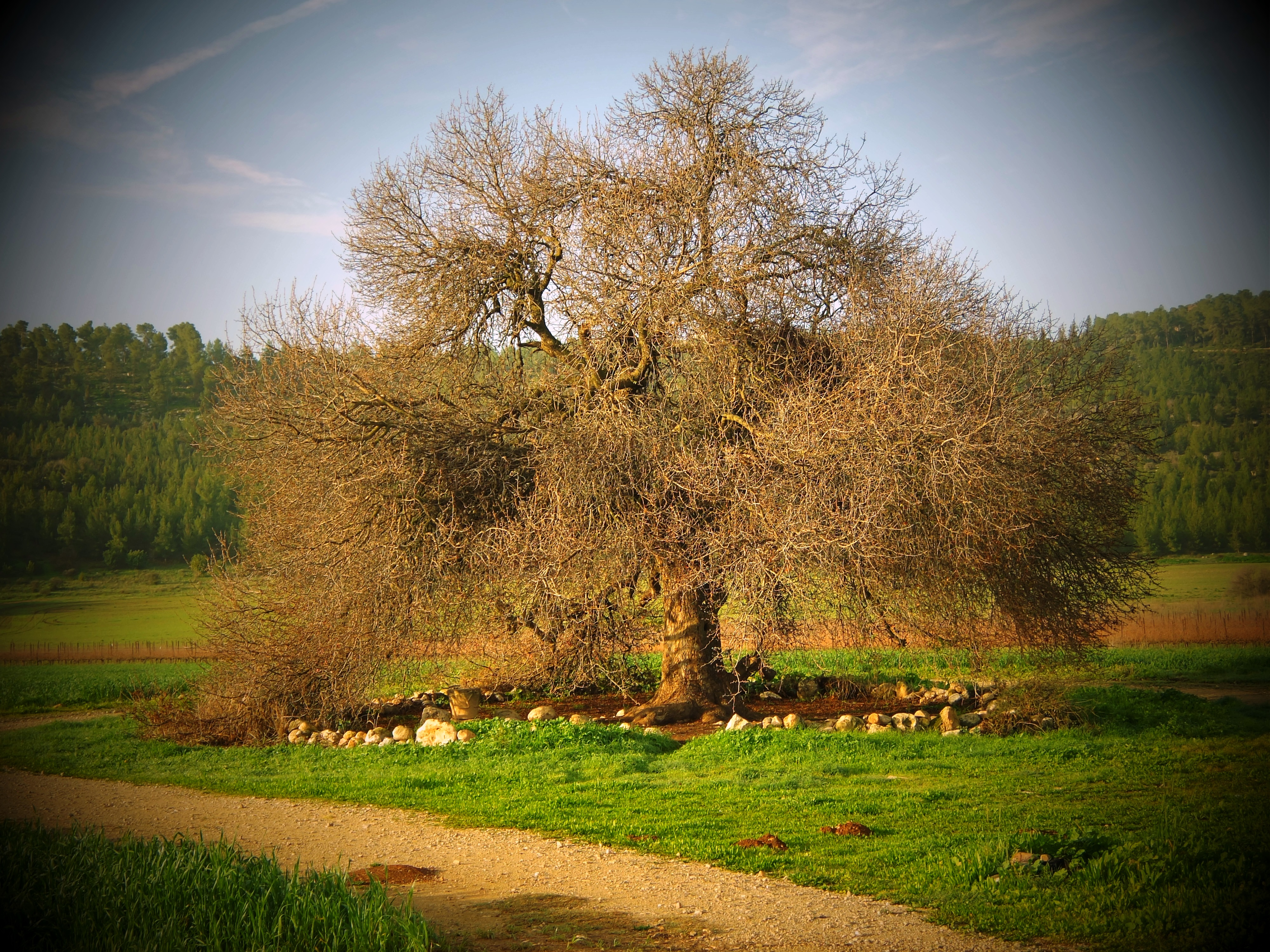
Terebinth (Pistacia atlantica) growing in the Elah Valley

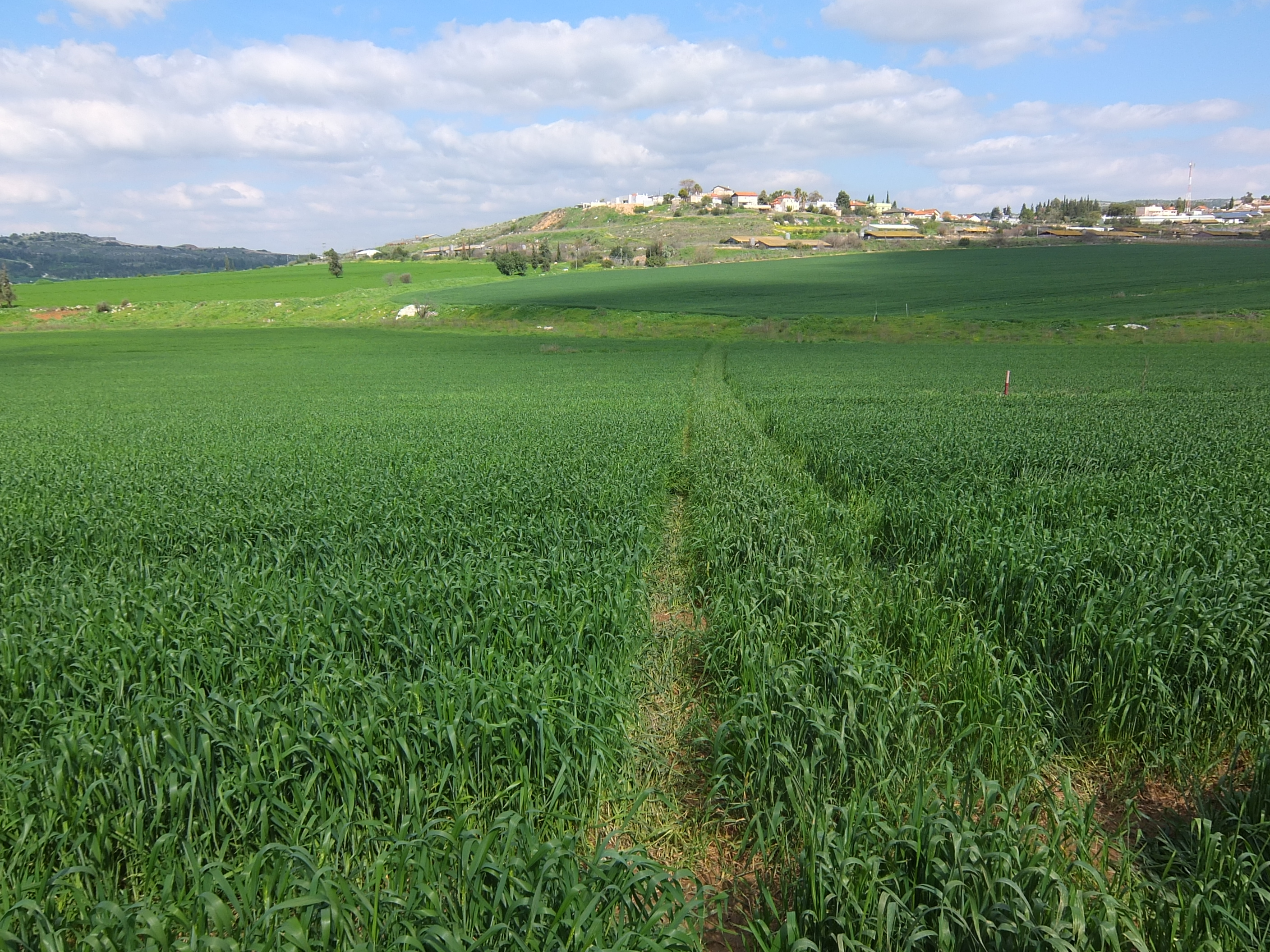
Wheat fields in the Valley of Elah

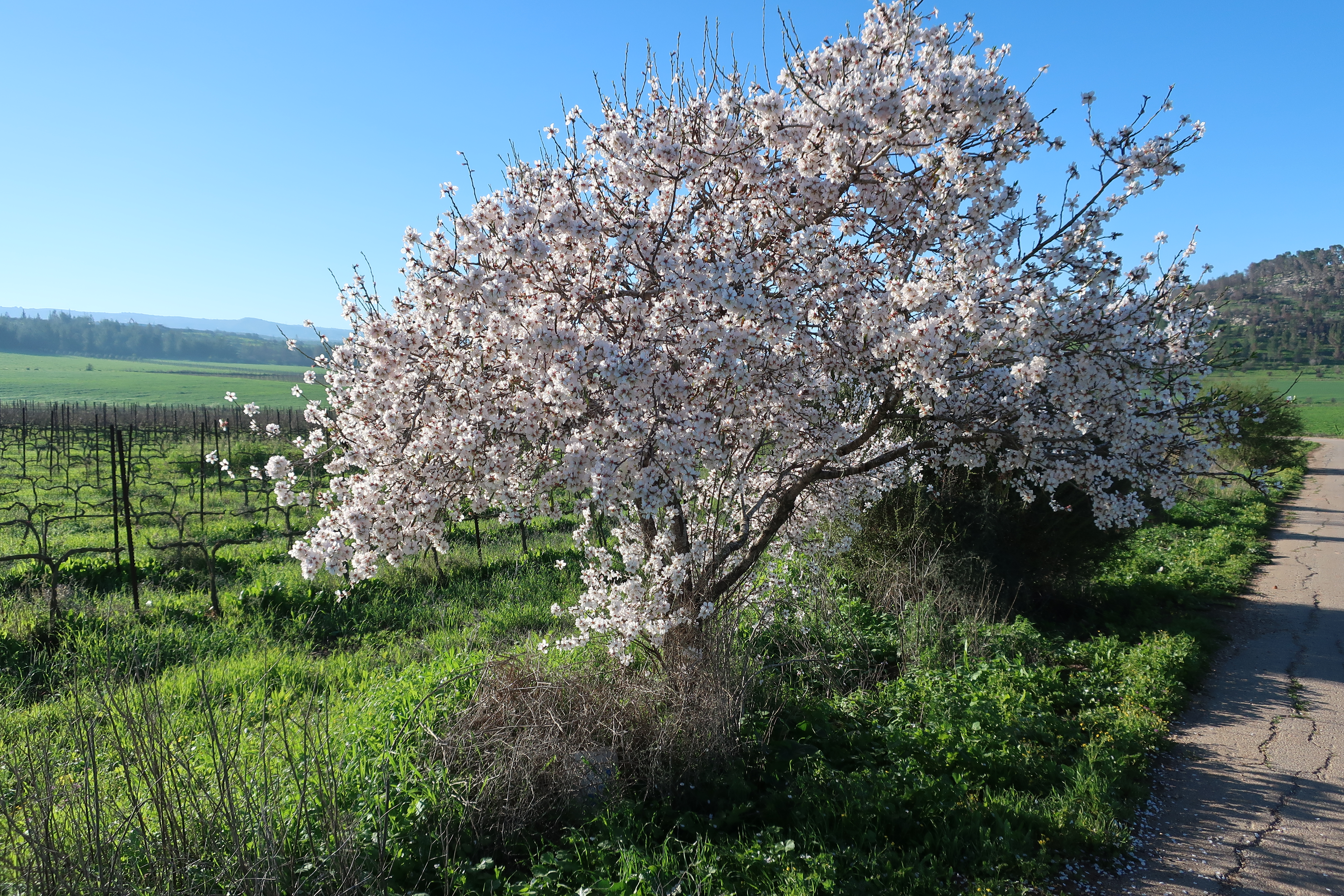
Almond tree with blossoming flowers

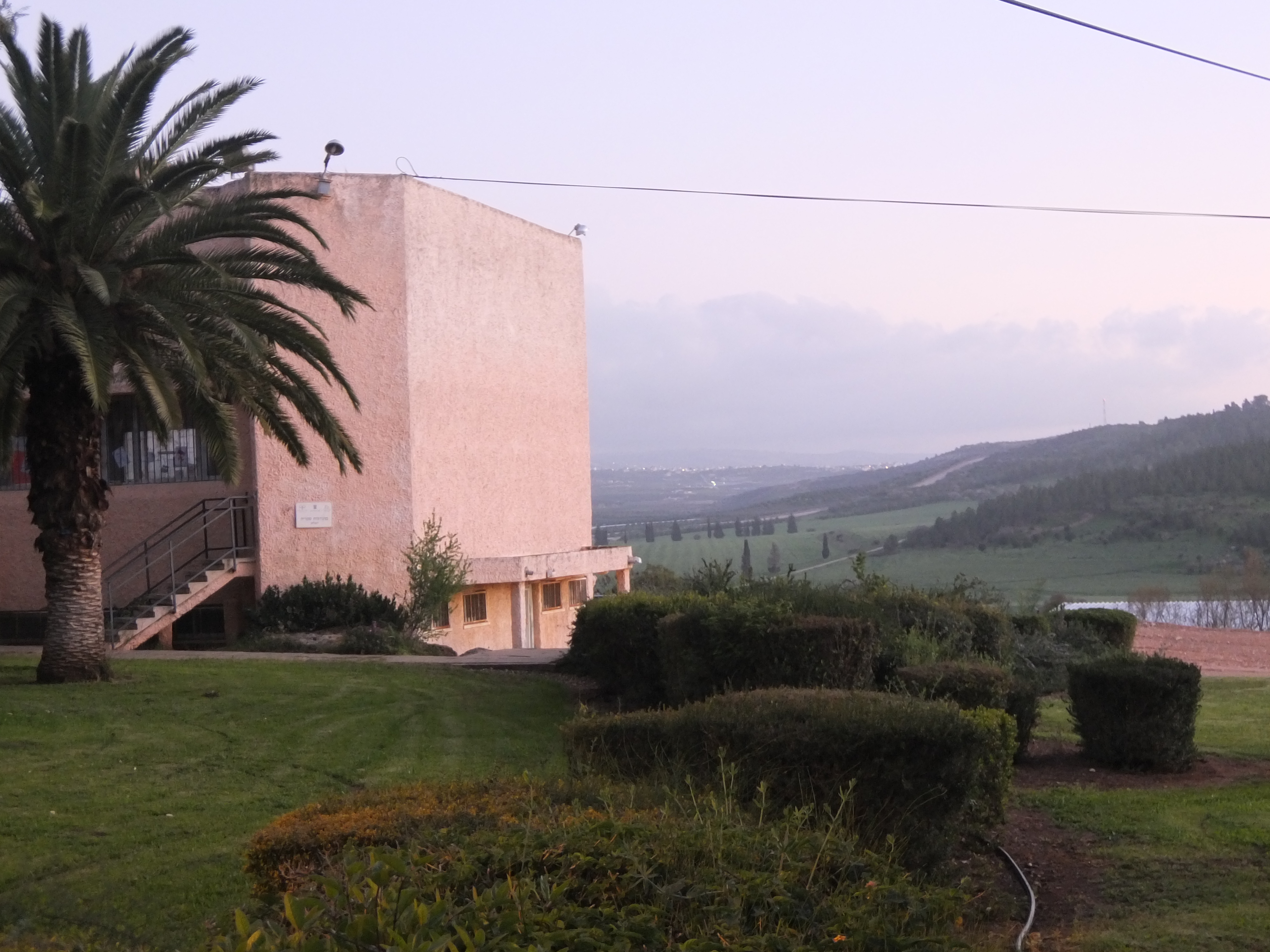
The Community Center in Moshav Neve Michael

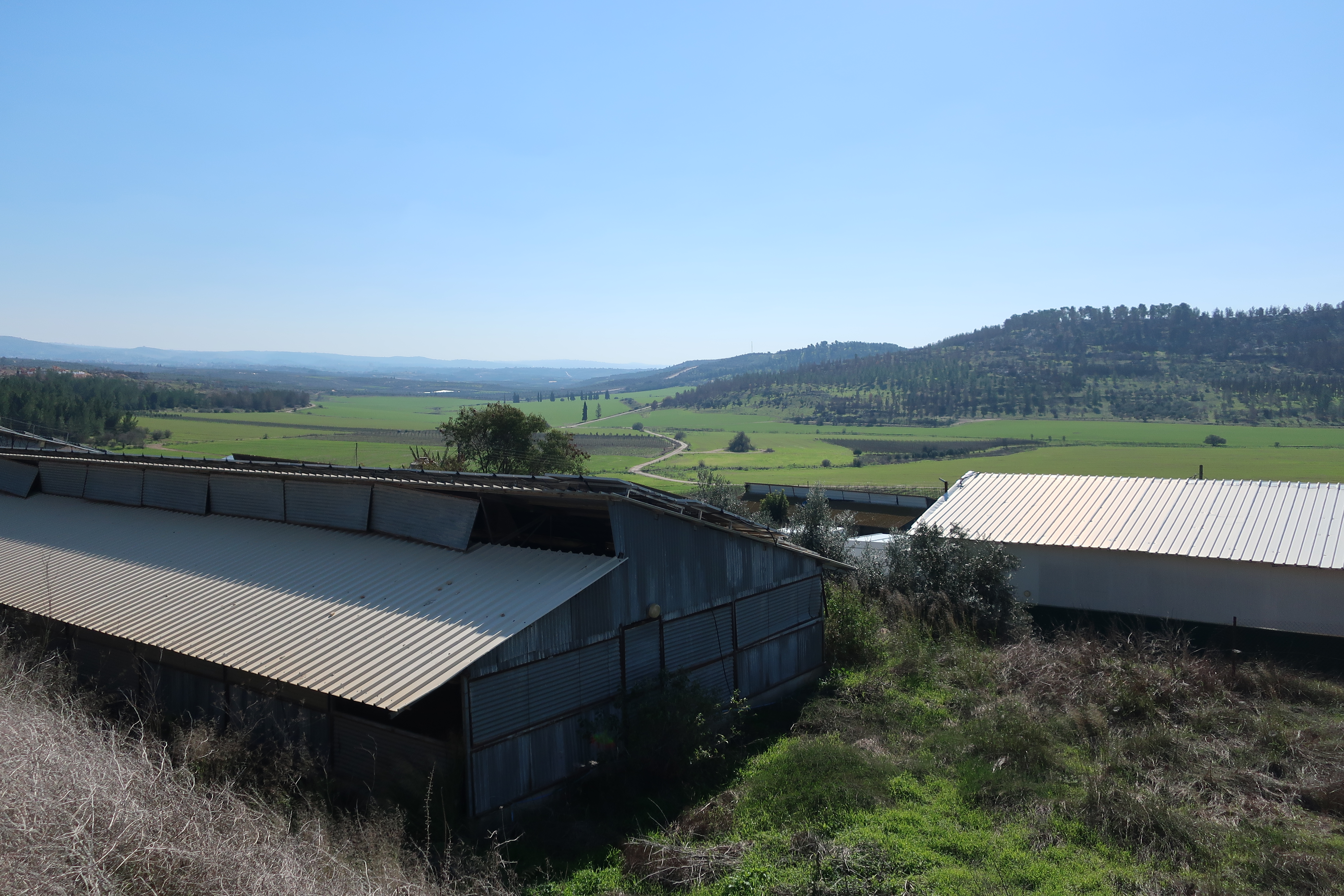
Neve Michael looking out over Wadi Sur

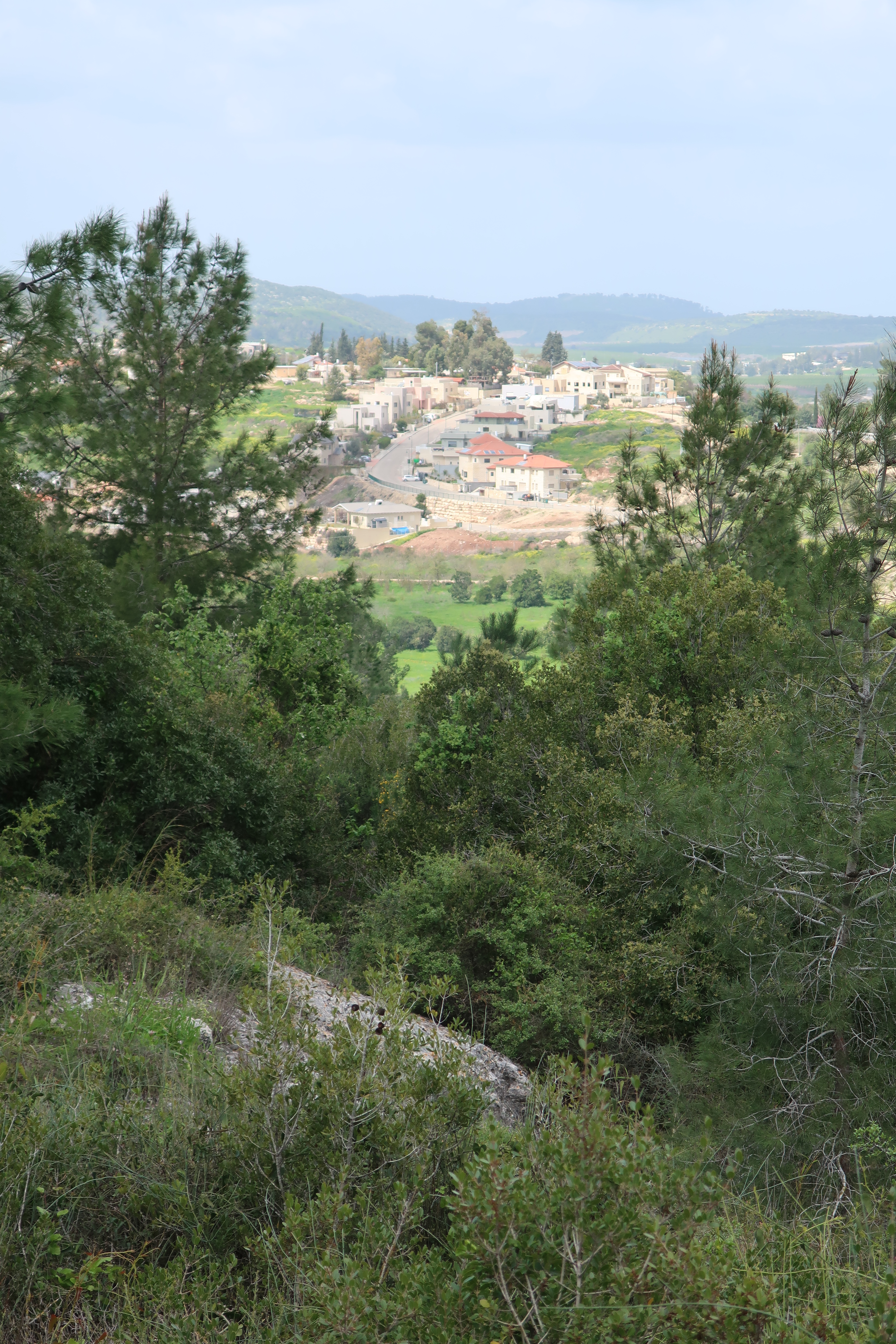
Moshav as seen from eastern mountain

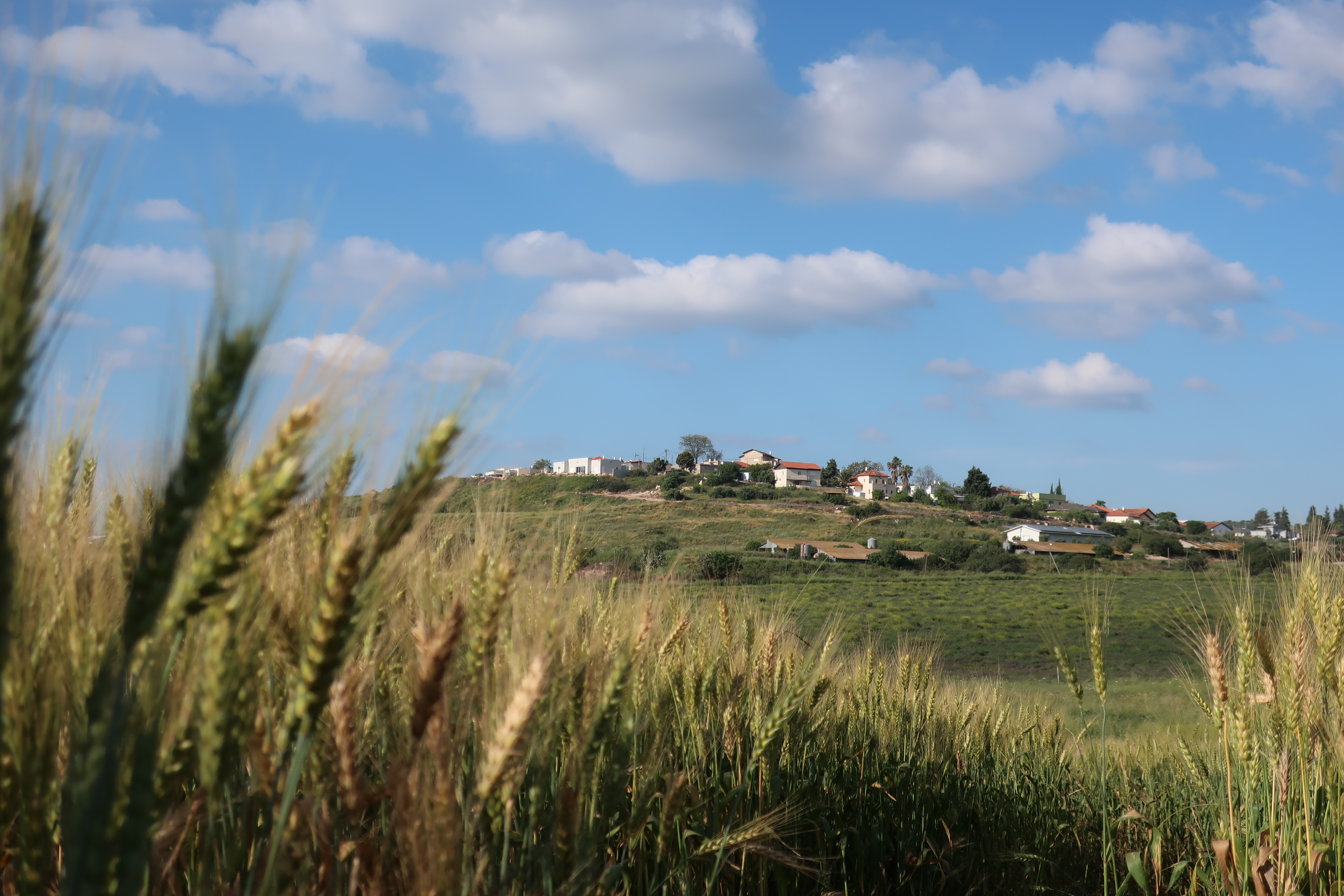
Wheat fields in valley

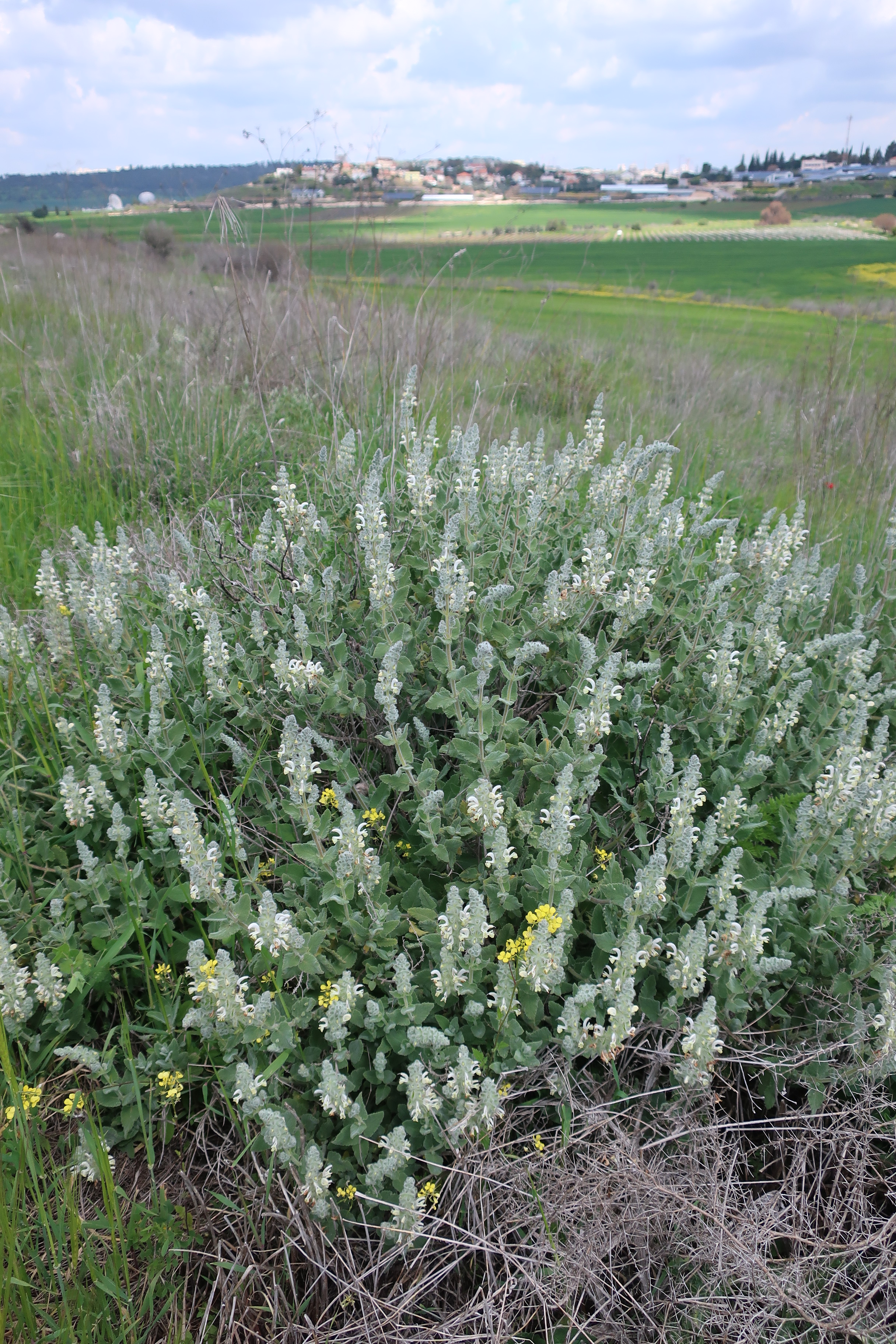
Dominican sage (Salvia dominica) and Neve Michael in background

== See also ==
- Giv'ot Eden, community settlement south-east and within walking distance of Neve Michael
