= Kamon, Israel =

Kamon: כַּמּוֹן (Hebrew)
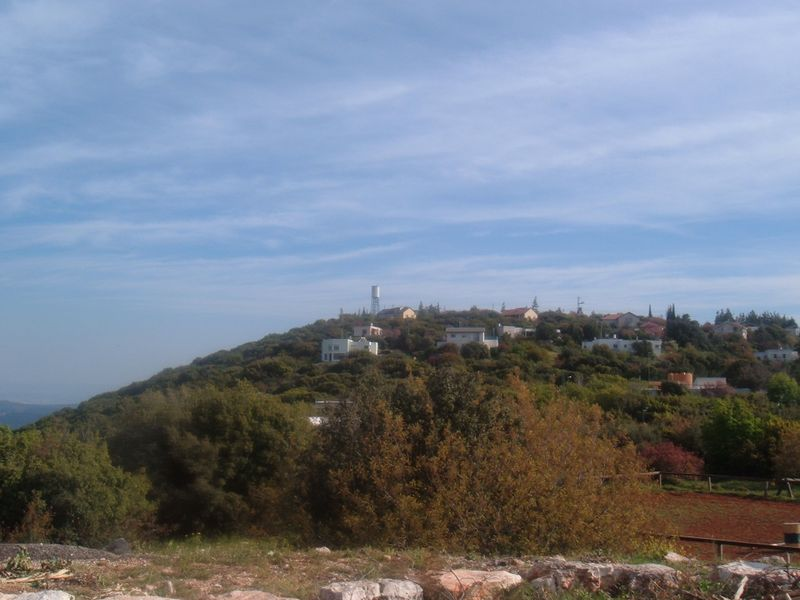

- Location within Northwest Israel
- Coordinates: 32°54′40″N 35°21′39″E
- Country: Israel
- District: Northern
- Subdistrict: Acre
- Council: Misgav
- Affiliation: Hitahdut HaIkarim
- Founded: 1980
- Population (2024): 699

Kamon (Hebrew: כַּמּוֹן, lit. Cumin) is a community settlement in northern Israel. Located in the Galilee on the two eastern peaks of Mount Kammon, it falls under the jurisdiction of Misgav Regional Council. In 2024 it had a population of 699.

== History ==
The village was established in 1980 by seven families, who initially lived in mobile homes.
