= Hibbat Zion =

Hibbat Zion (Hebrew: חיבת ציון) may refer to:

- Hibat Tzion, a moshav in central Israel.
- Lovers of Zion, a variety of proto-Zionist organizations founded in 1881
