= Elyashiv =

Moshav in central Israel

Elyashiv: אֶלְיָשִׁיב (Hebrew); إلياشيف (Arabic)
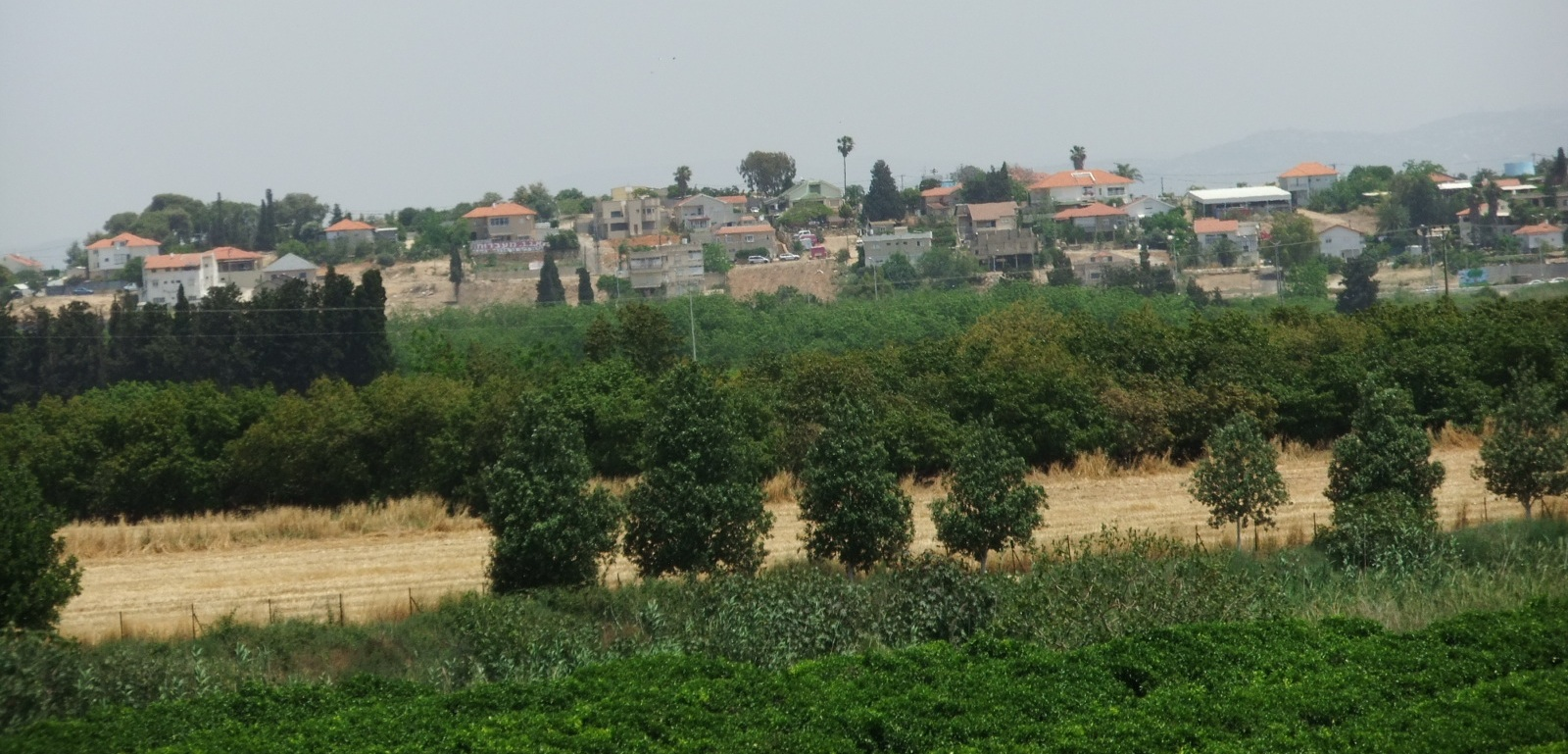

- Location within Central Israel Location within Israel
- Coordinates: 32°22′48″N 34°54′35″E
- Country: Israel
- District: Central
- Subdistrict: HaSharon
- Council: Hefer Valley
- Affiliation: Hitahdut HaIkarim
- Founded: 13 November 1933
- Founder: Yemenite Jews
- Population (2024): 681

Elyashiv (Hebrew: אֶלְיָשִׁיב, lit. 'God will bring back') is a moshav in central Israel. Located in the Sharon plain, it falls under the jurisdiction of Hefer Valley Regional Council. In 2024 it had a population of 681.

== History ==
The moshav was founded on a site once occupied by the Arab village Khirbet esh Sheikh Mohammed ("The ruin of Sheikh Mohammed"). Kh. esh Sheikh Muhammed became settled during the rule of Ibrahim Pasha, either by Egyptians or by hamulas (extended families) from mountain villages. In 1882, the PEF's Survey of Western Palestine found that it consisted of a few adobe huts among ruins. Ancient glazed pottery has been found there.

Although Yemenite neighborhoods had been established near many agricultural settlements, it was not until 1930 that independent Yemenite settlements were approved. After a prolonged struggle by the Yemenite Workers Federation in Palestine, three moshav ovdim were established: Marmorek in 1930, Tirat Shalom in 1931, and Elyashiv on 13 November 1933. Of these, Elyashiv was the largest and the only one that survived as a moshav. The original fifty families were Yemenite Jews who had been in Palestine since the 1920s. They belonged to an organization of Yemenite Jews called "Shabazi", founded in Petach-Tikva in 1931. It is named after a high priest in the time of Nehemiah (Nehemiah 3:1), and also in a symbolic meaning that God will return Israel back to their land.

The land for the moshav was provided by the Jewish National Fund, which had purchased a very large tract from a Lebanese Maronite in 1929 with the help of a bribe paid to the seller's legal representative. Agricultural instructors were provided by the Jewish Agency. However, unlike with other moshavot in the Hefer Valley, no financial assistance was provided by the moshav movement. The first decades were marked by continual conflict with the Jewish Agency.

The population was 310 in 1945 and 460 in 1952.

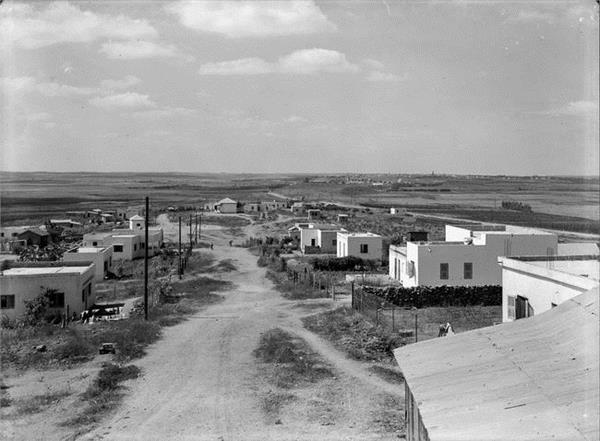
Elyashiv 1939

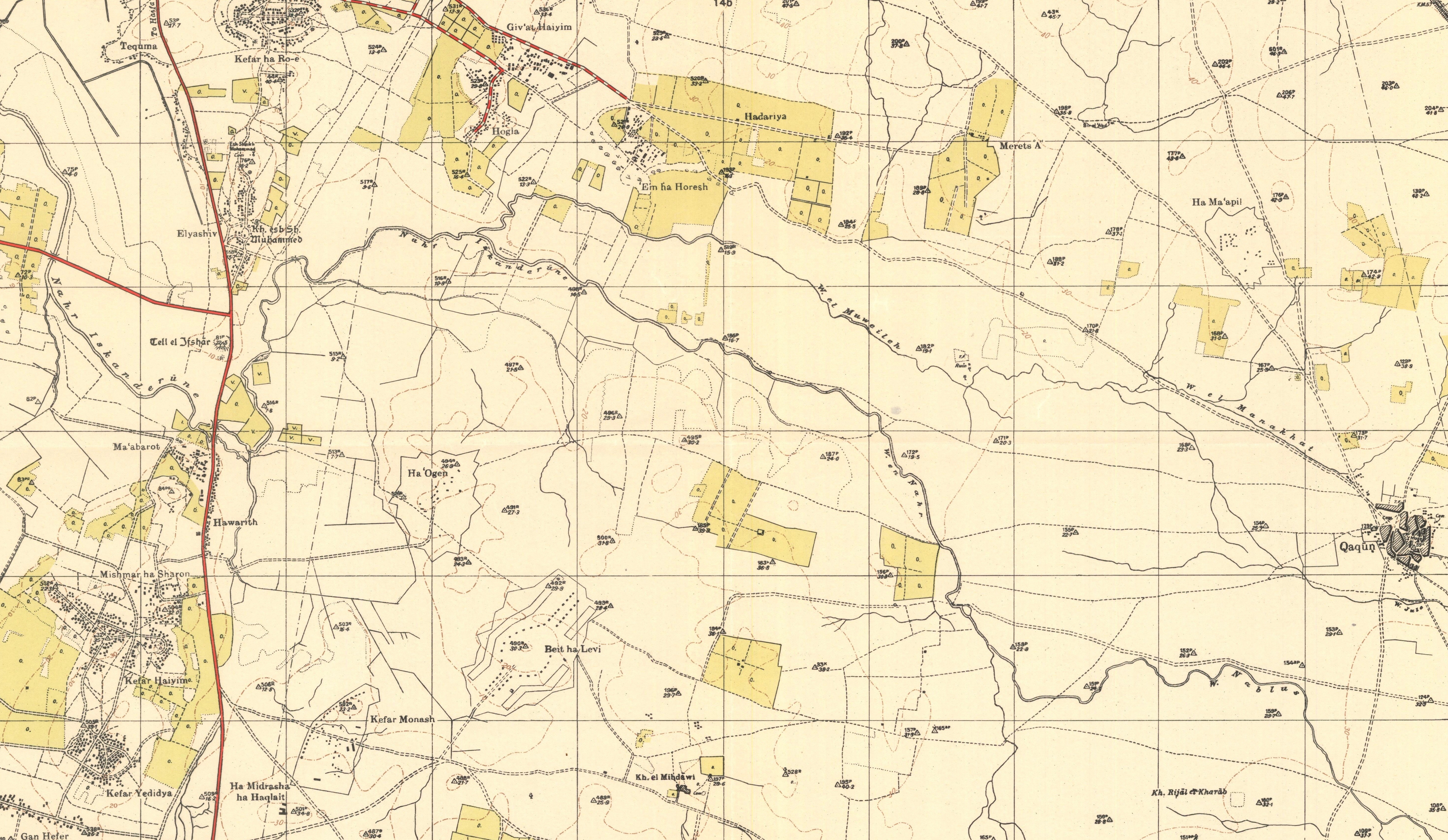
Elyashiv 1939 1:20,000

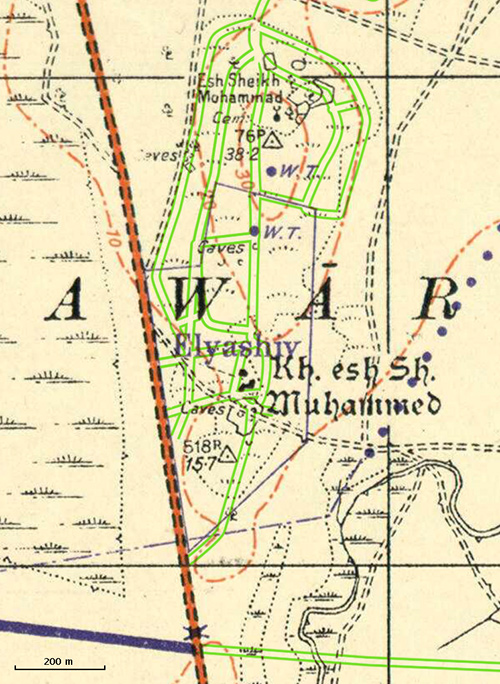
Vicinity of Yemenite moshav Elyashiv in 1941, with location of modern roads added in green

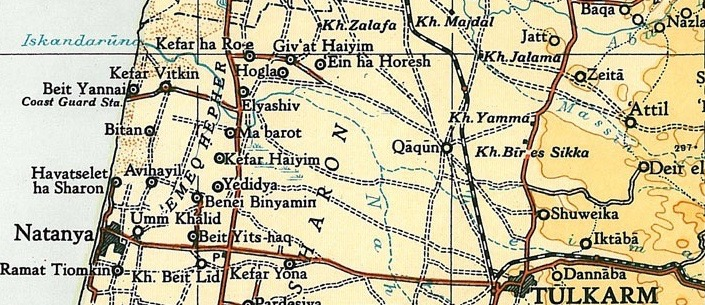
Elyashiv 1945 1:250,000

== Bibliography ==
- Adler (Cohen), Raya (1988). "The Tenants of Wadi Hawarith: Another view of the Land Question in Palestine". International Journal of Middle East Studies. 20 (2): 197–220. doi:10.1017/S0020743800033936. S2CID 163346325.
- Conder, C.R.; Kitchener, H.H. (1882). The Survey of Western Palestine: Memoirs of the Topography, Orography, Hydrography, and Archaeology. Vol. 2. London: Committee of the Palestine Exploration Fund.
- Department of Statistics (1945). Village Statistics, April, 1945. Government of Palestine.
- Hadawi, S. (1970). Village Statistics of 1945: A Classification of Land and Area ownership in Palestine. Palestine Liberation Organization Research Center.
- Karmon, Y. (1960). "An Analysis of Jacotin's Map of Palestine" (PDF). Israel Exploration Journal. 10 (3, 4): 155–173, 244–253. Archived from the original (PDF) on 2019-12-22.
- Palmer, E.H. (1881). The Survey of Western Palestine: Arabic and English Name Lists Collected During the Survey by Lieutenants Conder and Kitchener, R. E. Transliterated and Explained by E.H. Palmer. Committee of the Palestine Exploration Fund.
- Pringle, D. (1986). The Red Tower (al-Burj al-ahmar): Settlement in the Plain of Sharon at the time of the Crusaders and the Mamluks A.D. 1099–1516. Jerusalem Monograph Series no. 1. London: British School of Archaeology in Jerusalem.
- Sharaby, Rachel (1998). "Farming and Ethnic Identity: Yemenite Settlers Confront Modern Agriculture in Israel". The Journal of Israeli History. 19 (2): 21–37. doi:10.1080/13531049808576127.
- Sharaby, Rachel (2001). "Conflict, Adjustment, and Compromise: The Case of a Yemenite Moshav". The Jewish Journal of Sociology. 43 (1–2): 37–52.
