= Mikhmanim =

Mikhmanim: מִכְמַנִּים (Hebrew)
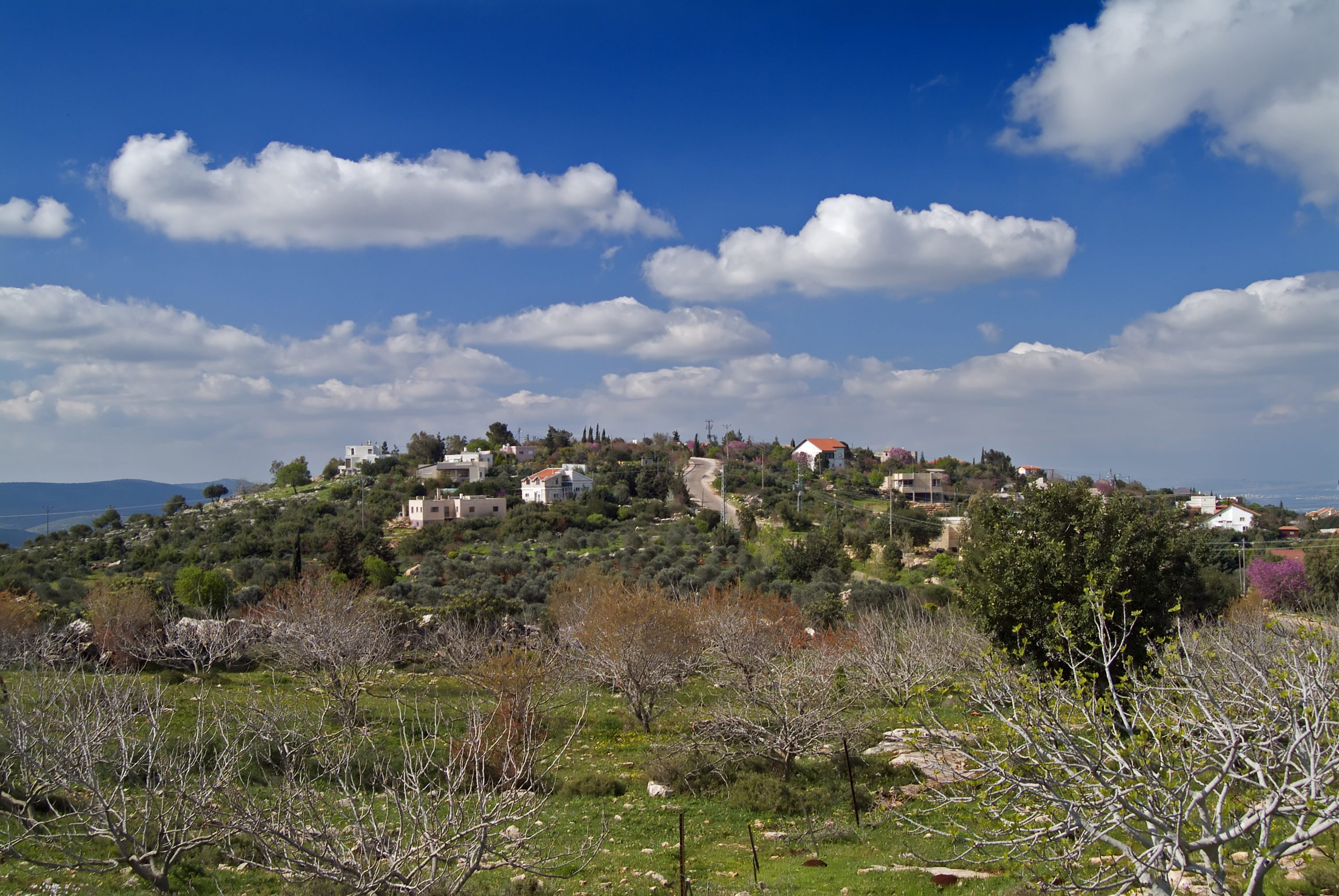

- Location within Northwest Israel Location within Israel
- Coordinates: 32°54′21″N 35°19′38″E
- Country: Israel
- District: Northern
- Subdistrict: Acre
- Council: Misgav
- Affiliation: Hitahdut HaIkarim
- Founded: 1980
- Population (2024): 548

Mikhmanim (Hebrew: מִכְמַנִּים) is a community settlement in northern Israel. Located atop Mount Kamun, the highest peak in the Lower Galilee, overlooking the city of Karmiel, it falls under the jurisdiction of Misgav Regional Council. In 2024 it had a population of 548.

== History ==
The village was established in 1980. By April 2011, the community had 70 families with 150 children. The community has a library, a daycare center for children ages 3–5, a clubhouse for teenagers, a social hall for community events and holiday celebrations, sports facilities, and a small industrial zone for entrepreneurs and small family businesses.

Mount Gilon primary school serves the needs of Grades 1–6. Other schools in the region are Ma'ale Zviyya, the Anthroposophical school in Misgav and the Galilee bilingual school in Misgav. Middle school and high school students attend classes at the Misgav Regional Center, which also houses a gym, an extracurricular activities center, a music school and a country club.
