= Ahwat =

Archaeological site in Israel

- الاحواط (Arabic) אל-אחוואט (Hebrew)
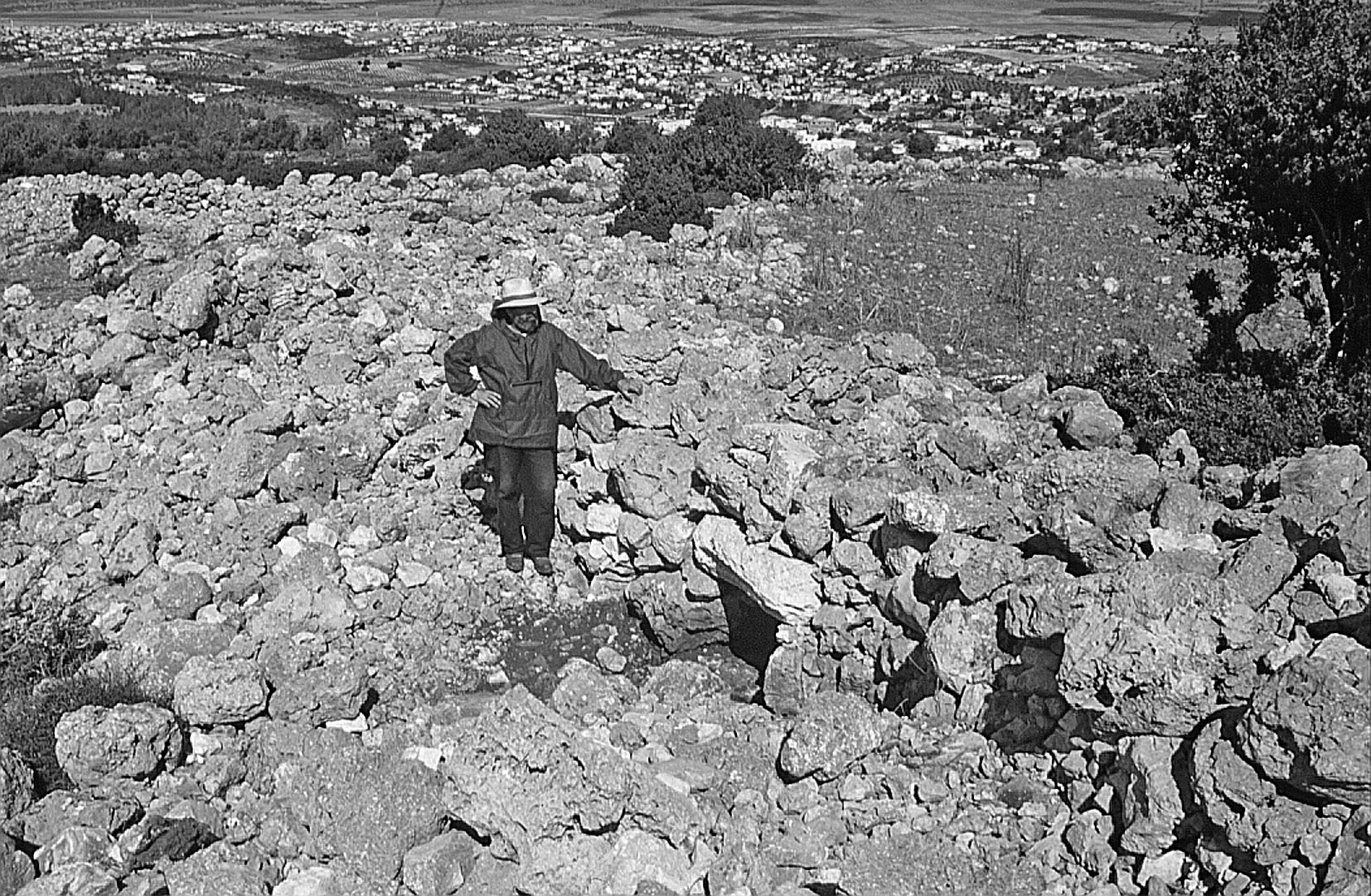

- Location within Israel
- 32.487149°N 35.093808°E
- Type: settlement
- Periods: Bronze Age, Iron Age
- Location: Israel
- Region: Manasseh Hills

Site notes
- Archaeologists: Adam Zertal
- Public access: Yes

El-Ahwat (Arabic: الاحواط, "the walls") is an archaeological site in the Manasseh Hills, Israel. It located 10 miles east of Caesarea near Katzir.

The site was discovered in November 1992 by Adam Zertal during the Manasseh Hill Country Survey. The settlement has been dated to the Bronze and Iron Ages. It is considered to be the location of the northwesternmost settlement of the ancient Sea Peoples in the region.

== History ==
Zertal's hypothesis is that the site, which resembles Late Bronze Age sites in Sardinia, was a settlement of the Shardana tribe of the Sea People, a seafaring culture from the 12th century, as the architecture of the site is similar to nuraghe sites in Sardinia. Zertal dates the site to 1160–1150 BCE, which conforms with the supposed date of the Sea Peoples' incursion to Israel, and the Biblical conflict between Sisera and Barak ben Avinoam (Judges 4–5). Zertal suggests that the site may have been the city of Harosheth Haggoyim, mentioned in Judges 4:2 as Sisera's place of residence.

Archaeologist Israel Finkelstein says that Zertal erred in his dating of the site. By comparing ceramic typologies and radiocarbon dating with other early Iron Age sites in Israel, Finkelstein estimates its date to be around 100 years later than Zertal.

Eric Cline and David O'Connor commented on Zertal's claim, saying that "So far, however, there is no identifiable Shardana pottery found at this or any other site in the region, and the interpretation of the architecture at El-Ahwat remains open to question."

Archaeologist Bar Shay, from Haifa University, has recently argued that the al Ahwat structures as Shardana ones, having no other parallels with other places outside of Sardinia and its Shardana culture.

== Chariot linchpin ==
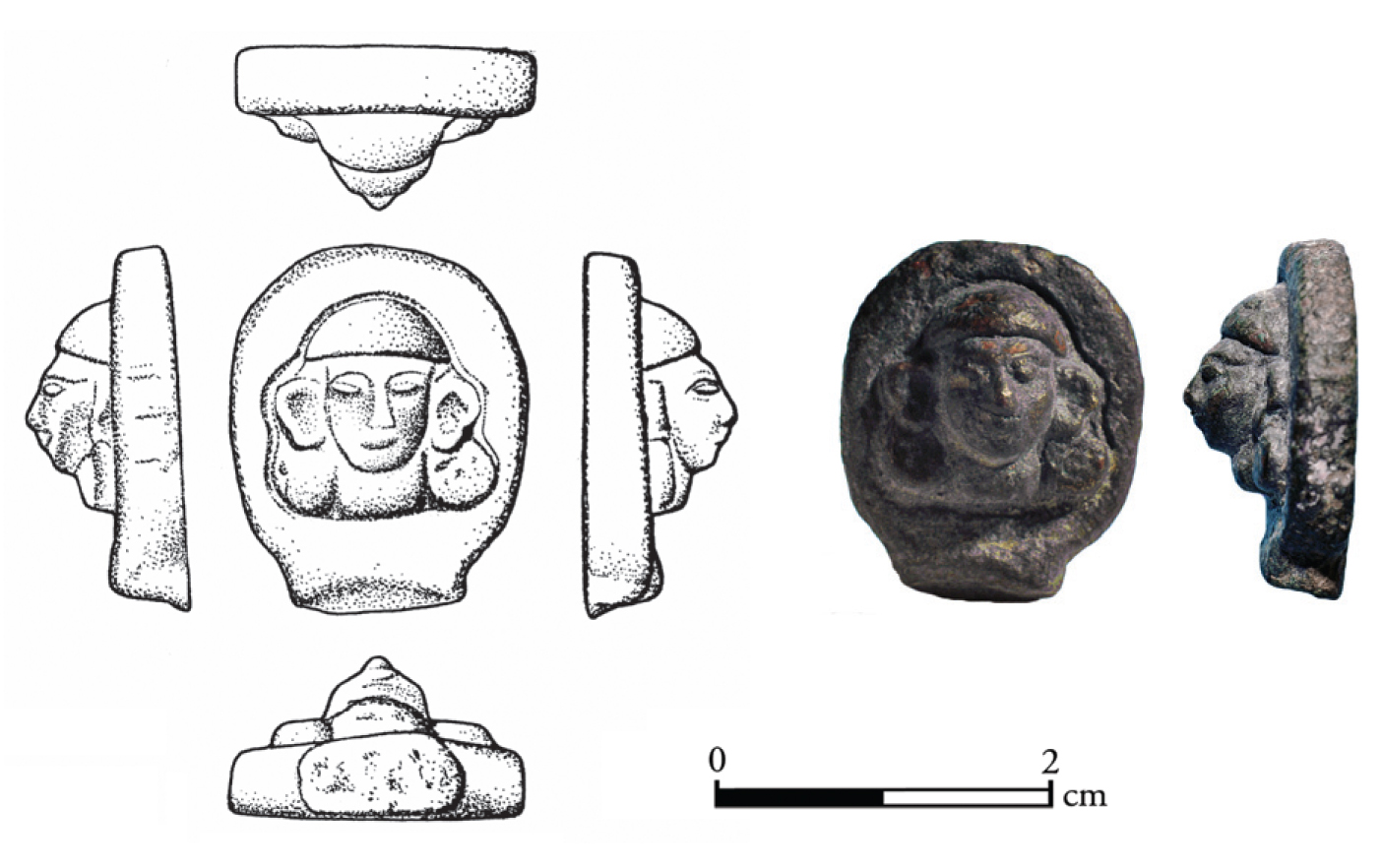
The linchpin

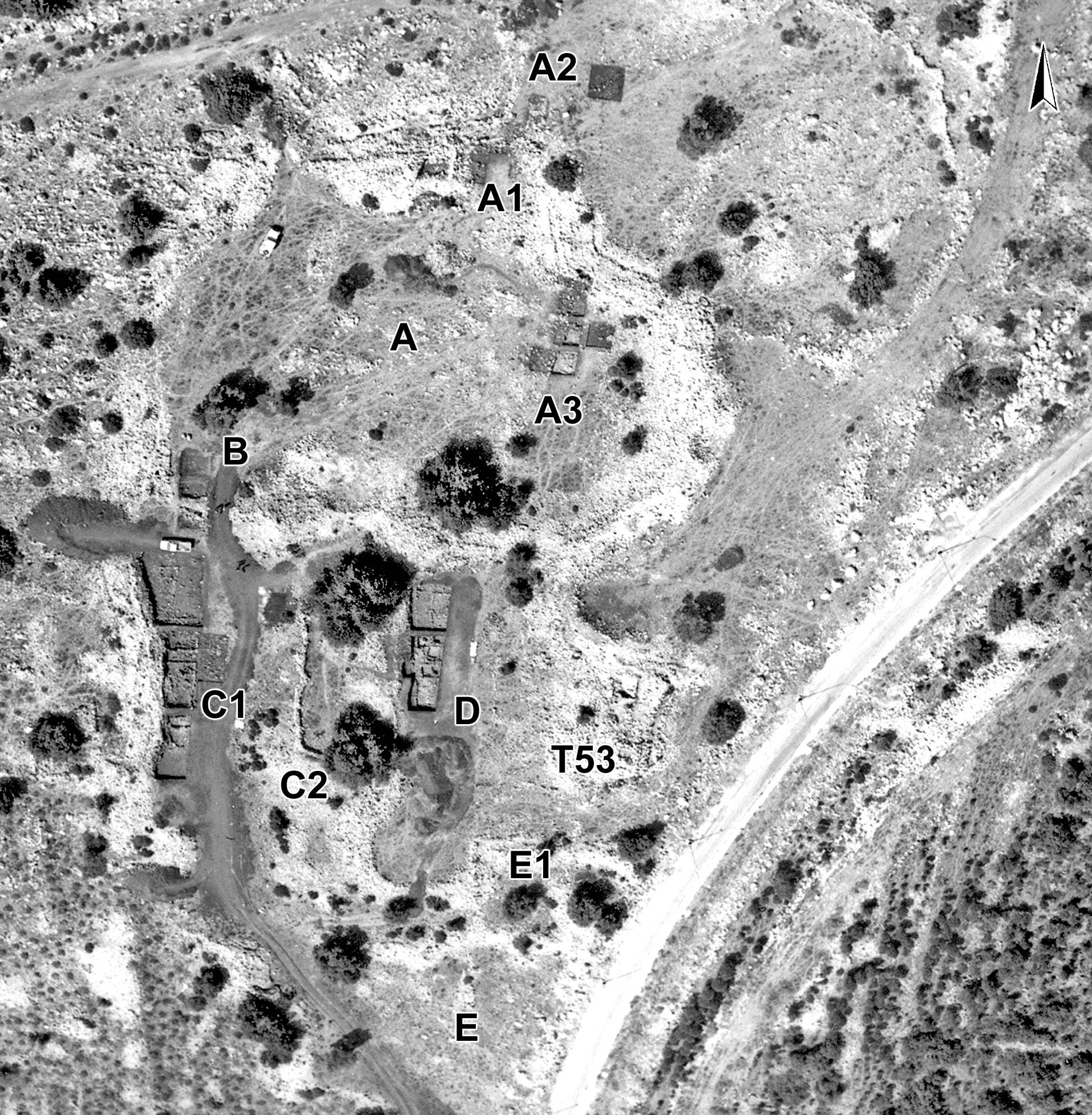
Aerial view of Al-Ahwat and excavation areas with view of wall surrounding the city

Among the more intriguing objects uncovered by the dig is a small, round, bronze relief measuring about 2 cm. in diameter and 5 mm. thick. The bronze shows the "face of a woman wearing a cap and earrings shaped as chariot wheels." It was found inside a structure identified by the archaeological team as the “Governor's House”. It is clear that the bronze was once the finial or end of an "elongated object" from which it had been broken off in antiquity.

It has now been identified as a linchpin from the wheel of a war chariot belonging to a high-ranking personage. It would have appeared on the side of a chariot in much the position as a modern hubcap.

Zertal explained the significance of the discovery, “This identification enhances the historical and archaeological value of the site and proves that chariots belonging to high-ranking individuals were found there. It provides support for the possibility, which has not yet been definitively established, that this was Sisera's city of residence and that it was from there that the chariots set out on their way to the battle against the Israelite tribes, located between the ancient sites of Taanach and Megiddo.”

== See also ==
- Archaeology of Israel
