= Hibat Tzion =

Moshav in central Israel

Hibat Tzion: חִבַּת צִיּוֹן (Hebrew)
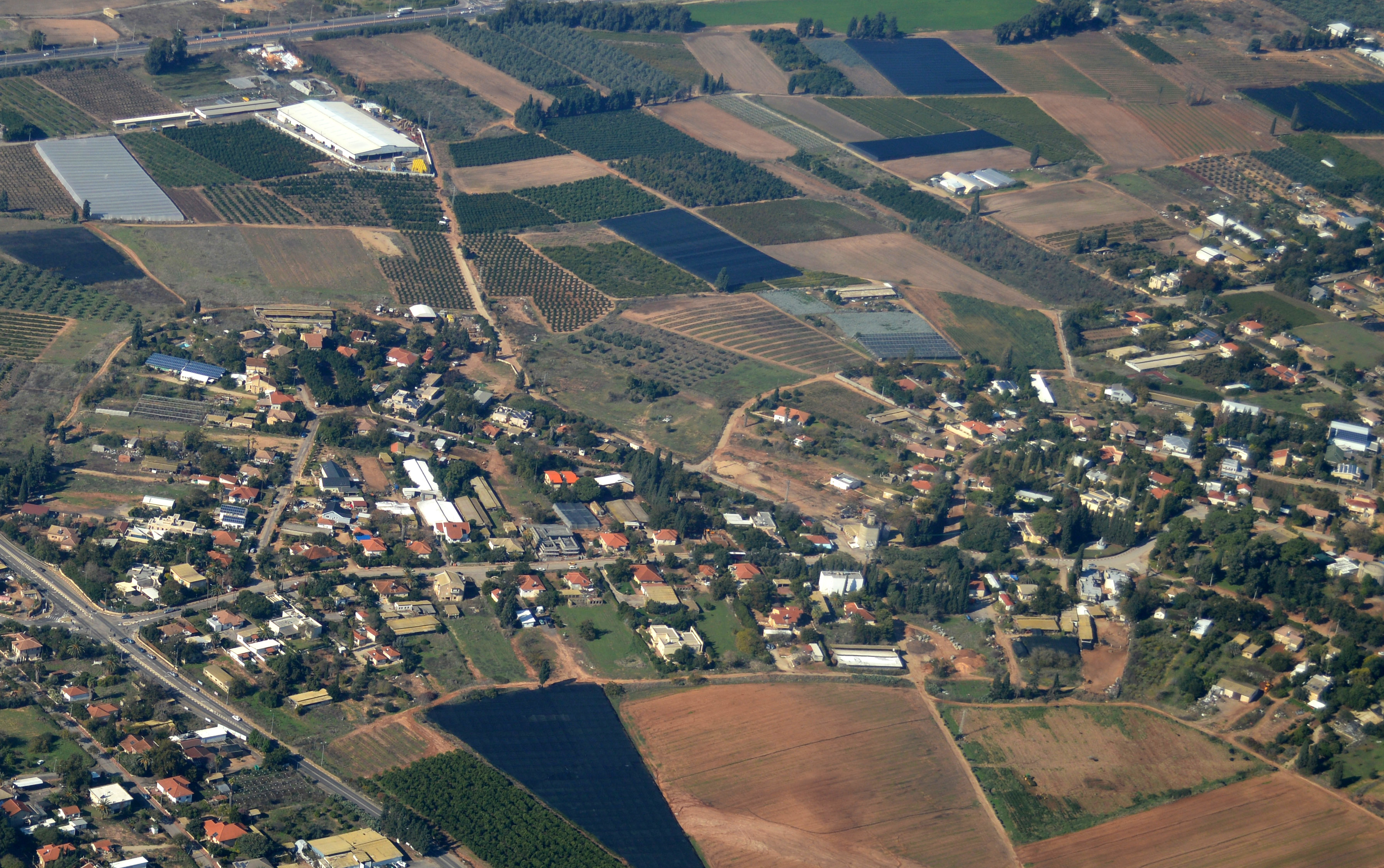

- Location within Central Israel
- Coordinates: 32°23′55″N 34°54′49″E
- Country: Israel
- District: Central
- Subdistrict: HaSharon
- Council: Hefer Valley
- Affiliation: Hitahdut HaIkarim
- Founded: 1933
- Founder: Agricultural Estate of the Russian Zionist Centre
- Population (2024): 955

Hibat Tzion (Hebrew: חִבַּת צִיּוֹן, lit. 'Fondness for Zion') is a moshav in central Israel. Located in the coastal plain near Hadera and covering 4,500 dunams (450 hectares; 1,100 acres), it falls under the jurisdiction of Hefer Valley Regional Council. In 2024 it had a population of 955. The community is mixed with religious and secular population.

== History ==
The moshav was founded in 1933 by the "Agricultural Estate of the Russian Zionist Centre" organization. It was named after the Hovevei Zion organization (also known as Hibbat Zion in Hebrew). The founders were later joined by immigrants from Central Europe.

It had the first organic Annona grove in Israel, and it remains the country's largest. It also had the country's first crematorium, which was operated by Alei Shalekhet. It was burned down by protesters in August 2007.
