= Community settlement =

Form of settlement in Israel and in the West Bank

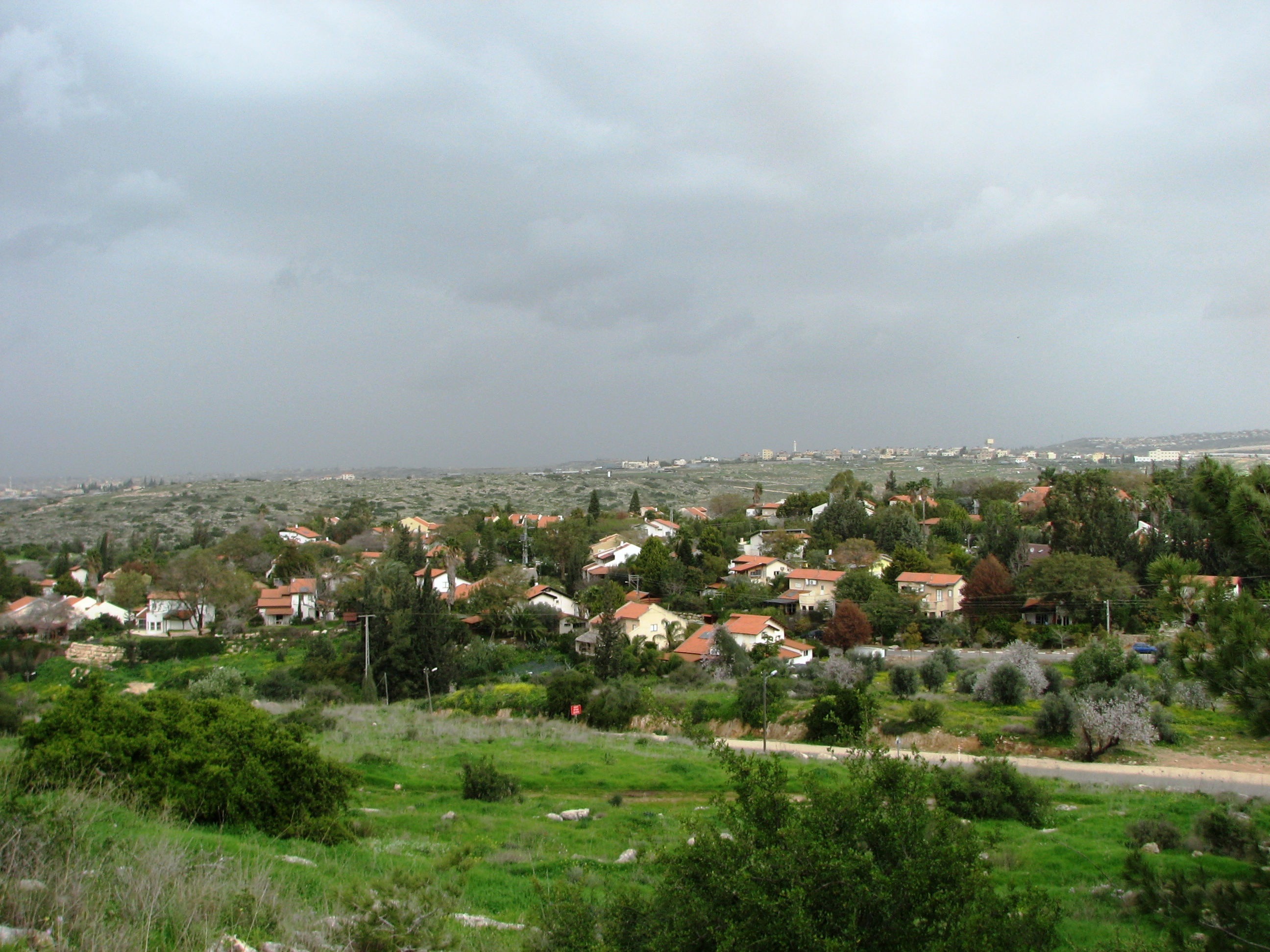
View of Nirit

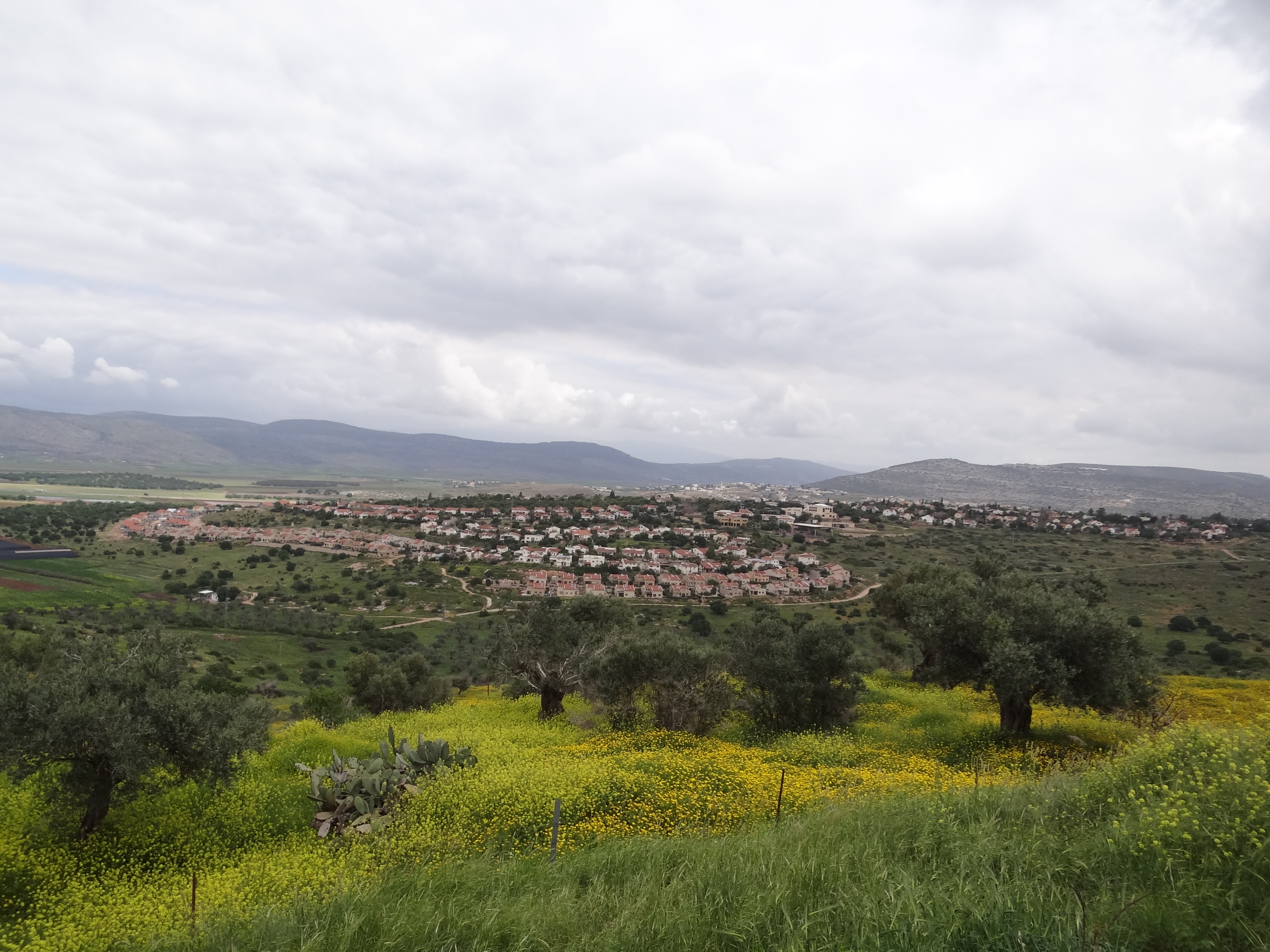
View of Hoshaya

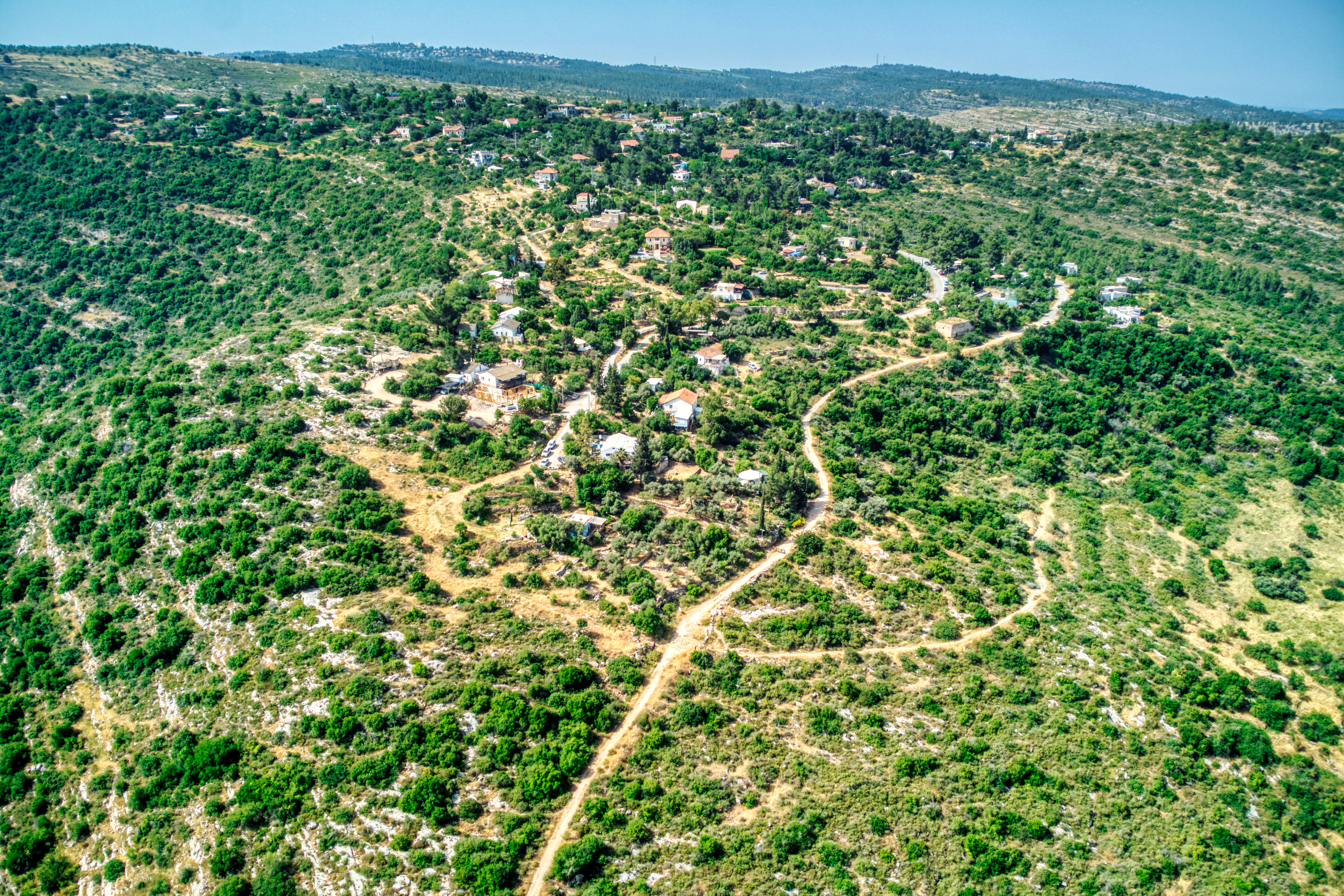
Nataf, Judaean Mountains

A community settlement (Hebrew: יישוב קהילתי, Yishuv Kehilati) is a type of town or village in Israel and in the West Bank. In an ordinary town, anyone may buy property, but in a community settlement, the village's residents are organized in a cooperative and have the power to approve or to veto a sale of a house or a business to any buyer. Residents of a community settlement may have a particular shared ideology, religious perspective or desired lifestyle, which they wish to perpetuate by accepting only like-minded individuals. For example, a family-oriented community settlement that wishes to avoid becoming a retirement community may choose to accept only young married couples as new residents.

As distinct from the traditional Israeli development village, typified by the kibbutz and moshav, the community settlement emerged in the 1970s as a non-political movement for new urban settlements in Israel. However, it essentially took shape as a new typology for settling the West Bank and the Galilee as part of the goal of establishing a "demographic balance" between Jews and Arabs. In practice, that means establishing Jewish-only settlements, which have the right to refuse Arabs from moving to them. Israeli courts have approved the policy in its ruling as well. The law explicitly prohibits explicit discrimination against members of other social groups, but it permits the admissions committees to reject candidates on such vague grounds as "unsuitability to the community's social life" or its "social-cultural fabric" or to "unique characteristics of the community as defined in its bylaws." Human rights organizations argue that the law could still enable communities to discriminate against individuals based on factors such as sexual orientation, disability, or ethnicity, contravening both Israeli and international legal standards against discrimination.

In 2013, there were 118 community settlements with total population of 84,800 residents.

== History ==
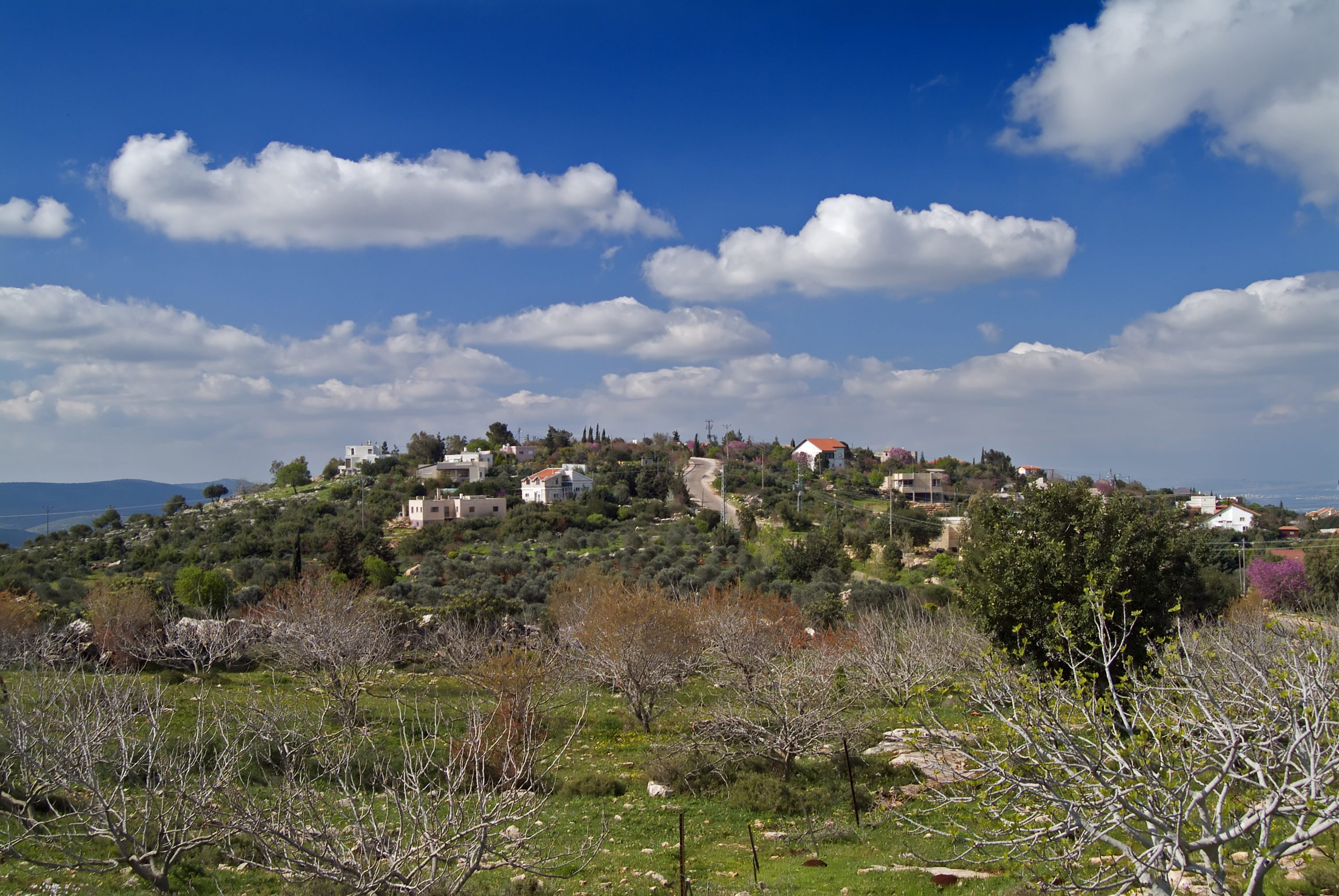
View of Mikhmanim

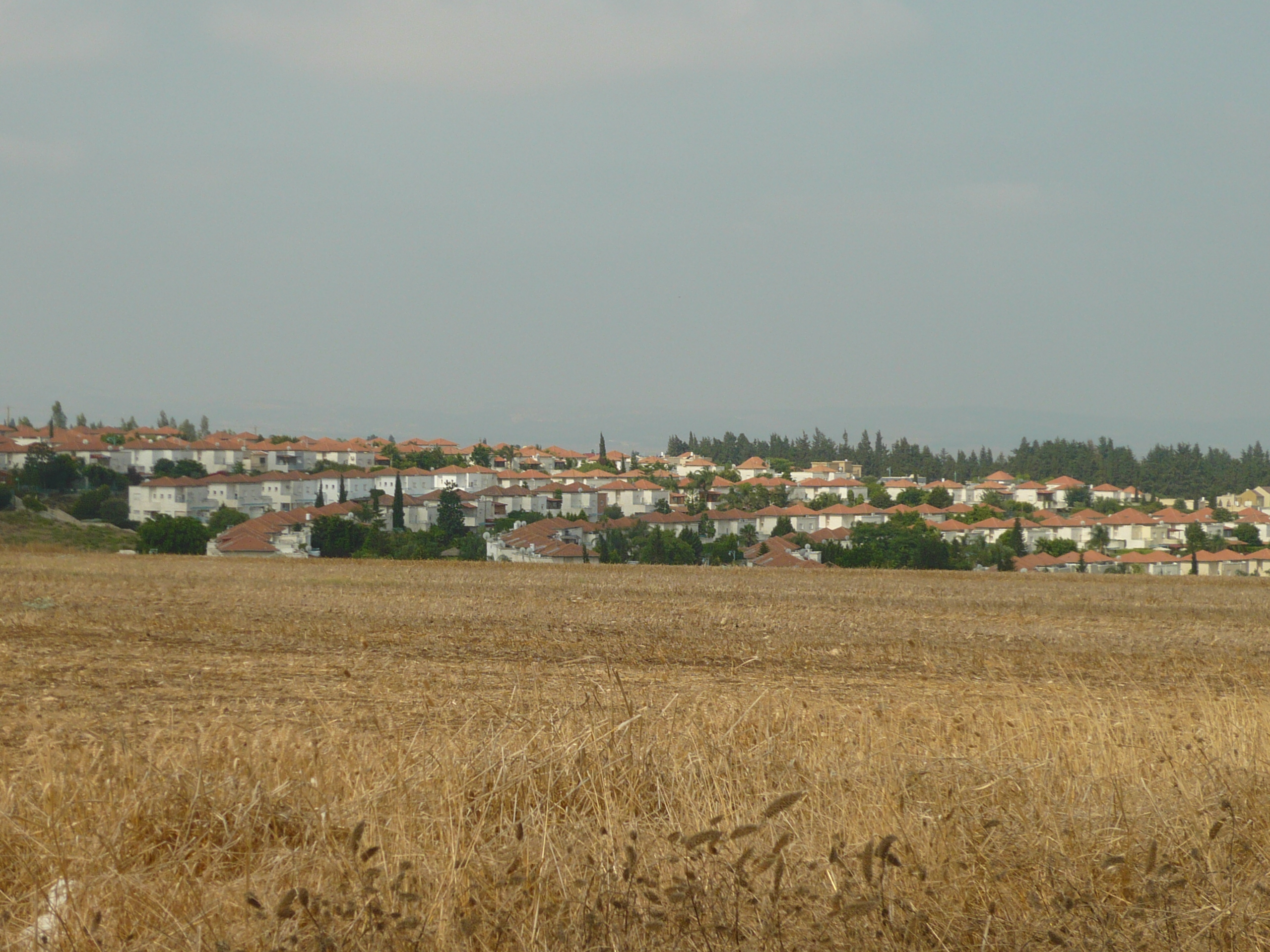
View of Ahuzat Barak

The first community settlement in Israel was Neve Monosson, in the Tel Aviv Metropolitan Area, which was established in 1953. From 1977, the Likud led government supported expansion of Israeli Jewish settlements in the West Bank and Gaza Strip. Within a few years, community settlements were the most common localities in those regions. In 1981, the first such town, Timrat was established in the Galilee region.

According to Gershom Gorenberg, the term was adopted for a type of West Bank Israeli settlement by a 'maverick planner' in the Gush Emunim movement. The settlement of Ofra was to form the model for later community settlements, whose founders wished to create a community that broke with the socialist model, one where people could farm privately, run businesses, or use the exclusive exurb village to commute to work in the metropolis. All residents were to share an "ideological-social background. The planning envisaged nuclear family housing in an amenable natural ambiance. The sum total of people in any such community was planned to be restricted to no more than a few hundred families.

A seminal role in the extension of the model into the Palestinian territories was played by the World Zionist Organization (WZO) and Amanah, Gush Emunim's settlement branch in the West Bank. Recognition of these exurbs as community settlements developed only gradually, since they differed from the standard norms of being 'cooperative' and 'productive'. Gush Emunim pushed this type of settlement, designed in dense networks, because it was best suited to hilly terrain, where agricultural and water resources were poor, and where the density of Palestinian habitation high. Life was based on family networks and partial cooperation, adapted to housing white-collar people with jobs in Israel.

According to Elisha Efrat, Gush Emunim intended to establish Israeli Jewish settlement as an irreversible reality in the Palestinian territories. The mountain strip community settlements were developed in two strategically parallel lines: the first central string of settlements runs parallel to the main road connecting the five major Arab cities of Jenin, Nablus, Ramallah, Bethlehem and Hebron, while the second, east to the watershed, runs parallel to the Allon Highway. The objective of this design is to create blockages hindering Palestinians from expanding their towns in the direction of the road, and impeding the conurbation of their communities lying on either sides of the road. The concept was institutionalized in the Drobless Plan (1978) drawn up by the WZO, which set down the guidelines for thwarting the establishment of a Palestinian state on the West Bank.

The first community settlement, Ofra, was established in 1975, and four of the first five settlements were unauthorized. The reevaluation and recognition of such settlements as cooperative associations was based on the ascendancy to government of the Likud party, which seconded the rapid growth of closed exurbs in which religious nationalists played a dominant role. The Gush Emunim plan was eventually adopted by both the World Zionist Organization and Israel's Ministry of Agriculture. With the ascendancy of the Likud Party, community settlements rapidly expanded in number: by 1987, there were a total of 95 and two years later, most of the 115 settlements established were of this kind. Such settlements were also attractive as destinations for "quality of life" secularists, for whom easy commuting to their metropolitan workplaces and the low cost of housing in settlements were notable incentives.

Community settlements are in Israeli legal terms cooperative associations: in practice they have been defined as 'private, members-only suburban village(s)'. While in an ordinary village anyone may buy property, in a community settlement the village's residents, who are organized in a cooperative, have approval (or veto power) over any sale of a house or a business.

Each community settlement has its own selection process for admitting residents, together with mechanisms for monitoring all aspects of communal life, from religious observance and ideological rigour, to how one uses the land outside one's home. Warnings accompany observed failures to live up to the principles of the community, and, if not taken into account, can lead to expulsion. The design of these principles arose out of a perceived necessity of impeding Arabs from residing in such settlements. Monitoring may have a particular shared ideology, religious perspective, or desired lifestyle which they wish to perpetuate by accepting only like-minded individuals.

In West Bank community settlements, single-family housing with private yards, which are emblems of status, are the most common residential type. Unlike kibbutzim and moshavim, community settlements generally lack any agriculture and depend on residents commuting elsewhere for employment. In this sense, they serve primarily as dormitory towns or quarters.

== Legal structure ==
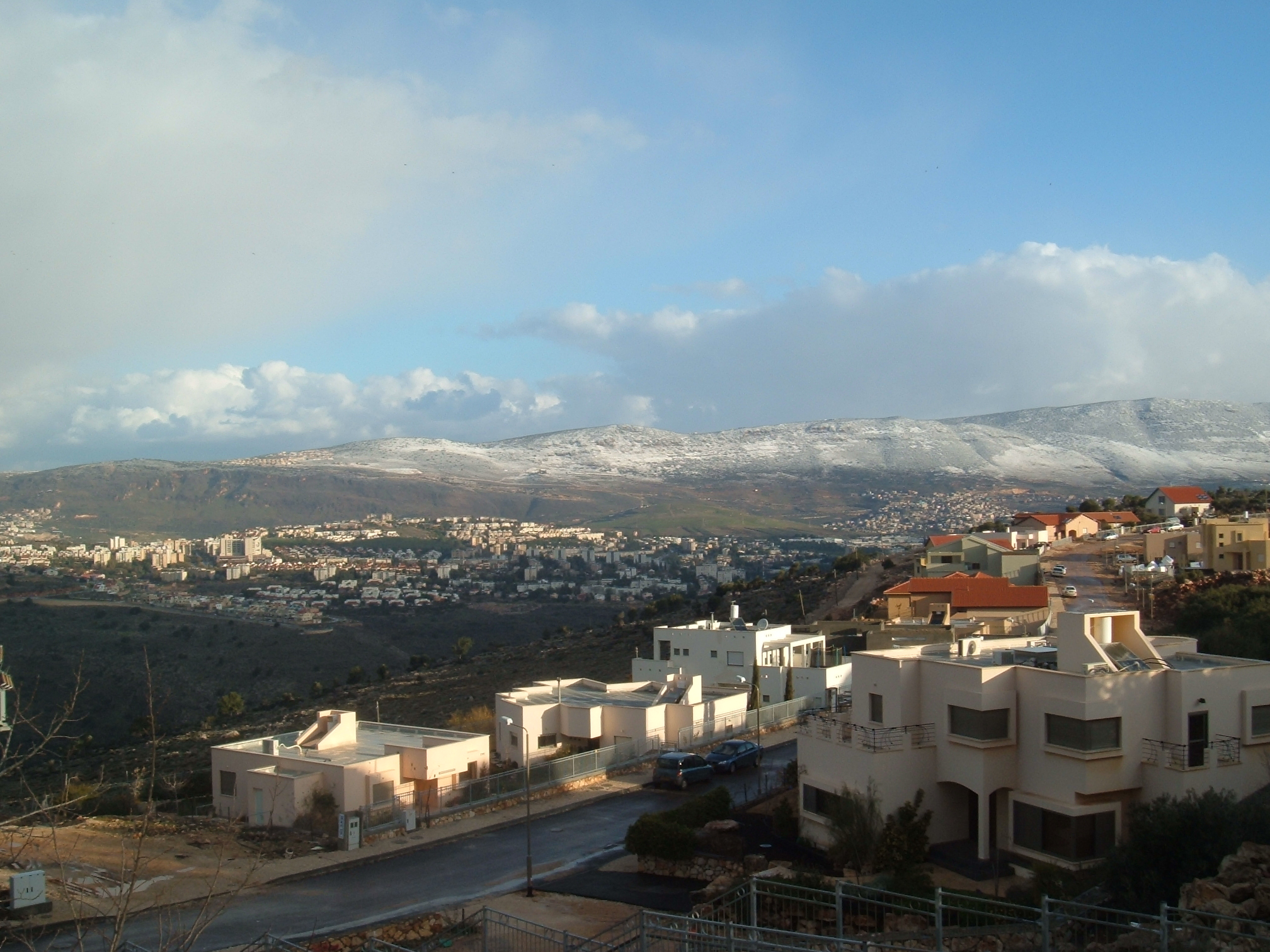
View of Eshhar

Legally, a community settlement operates as a cooperative in which all property-owning residents must be members. To enforce the restrictions on reselling property, property on a community settlement is formally not sold, but rather leased. The land of the entire settlement is owned by one entity (usually the Jewish National Fund through the Israel Land Administration), which leases out individual plots only to members of the cooperative. In that sense, a community settlement is much like a village-sized housing cooperative.

Israeli law bans the allocation of land resources on a preferential basis. According to Eyal Weizman, the community settlement system developed techniques to bypass those laws by having state land, either in Israel or in the Palestinian territories, placed in the custody of legal bodies registered in the United States, Jewish Agency or the World Zionist Organization. By this means, he asserts, the state of Israel was 'enabled to circumvent its own laws'.

The residents cooperative may also own private businesses and service industries within or in proximity to the settlement. These are often used for keeping certain public facilities, such as preschool, synagogues, grocery stores, sport facilities, youth clubs, swimming pools, etc., in the hands of the entire community. However, unlike a kibbutz or a moshav, the economic cooperation between residents is very loose - most residents work outside the settlement, and residents only pay minimal property taxes to the cooperative to help maintain the village and its public facilities.

Note that despite a popular misconception, the mere existence of community-owned facilities is not what differentiates community settlements from ordinary villages, as most ordinary villages also have the same types of facilities - preschool, synagogues, sport centers and sometimes even swimming pools - owned and operated by the village. Likewise, the mere existence of a democratic body of residents which makes decisions and organizes events for the whole community is not a defining feature of community settlements; ordinary villages also have their own local governments which are democratically elected by their residents.

Most community settlements are small, typically amounting to communities of 50-500 families, and are therefore too small to form their own separate formal municipalities. Instead, the residents' cooperative is recognized by the state of Israel as a local committee. Several such local committees can, for example, form together a regional council, which is one of the three types of local government in Israel. In practice, the regional council often has more impact on the residents' life than the cooperative of their own settlement. It is the regional council which will normally run schools, build roads, collect property taxes, and even run its own screening process.

== Controversy ==
To permanently move to a community settlement, potential residents must join the cooperative. An interview and acceptance process is often required to join the cooperative and move into the community. The Association for Civil Rights in Israel has claimed that this screening process is designed to deny membership to Arabs, and that sometimes Jews of specific ethnic or socio-economic groups are also discriminated against. Adalah – The Legal Center for Arab Minority Rights in Israel issued a press release:

On 6 January 2009, the Supreme Court of Israel issued an order nisi (order to show cause) that compels the state to respond within 60 days to a petition filed by Adalah demanding the cancellation of admission committees in "community towns", which select among candidates who wish to live in these village. Overwhelmingly, these admissions committees exclude Arab families, Eastern Jews, single-parent families, gays, unmarried persons and other social groups from "community towns".
