= Shefar'am Natural Region =

Coordinates: 32°48′20″N 35°10′10″E

- Natural Region
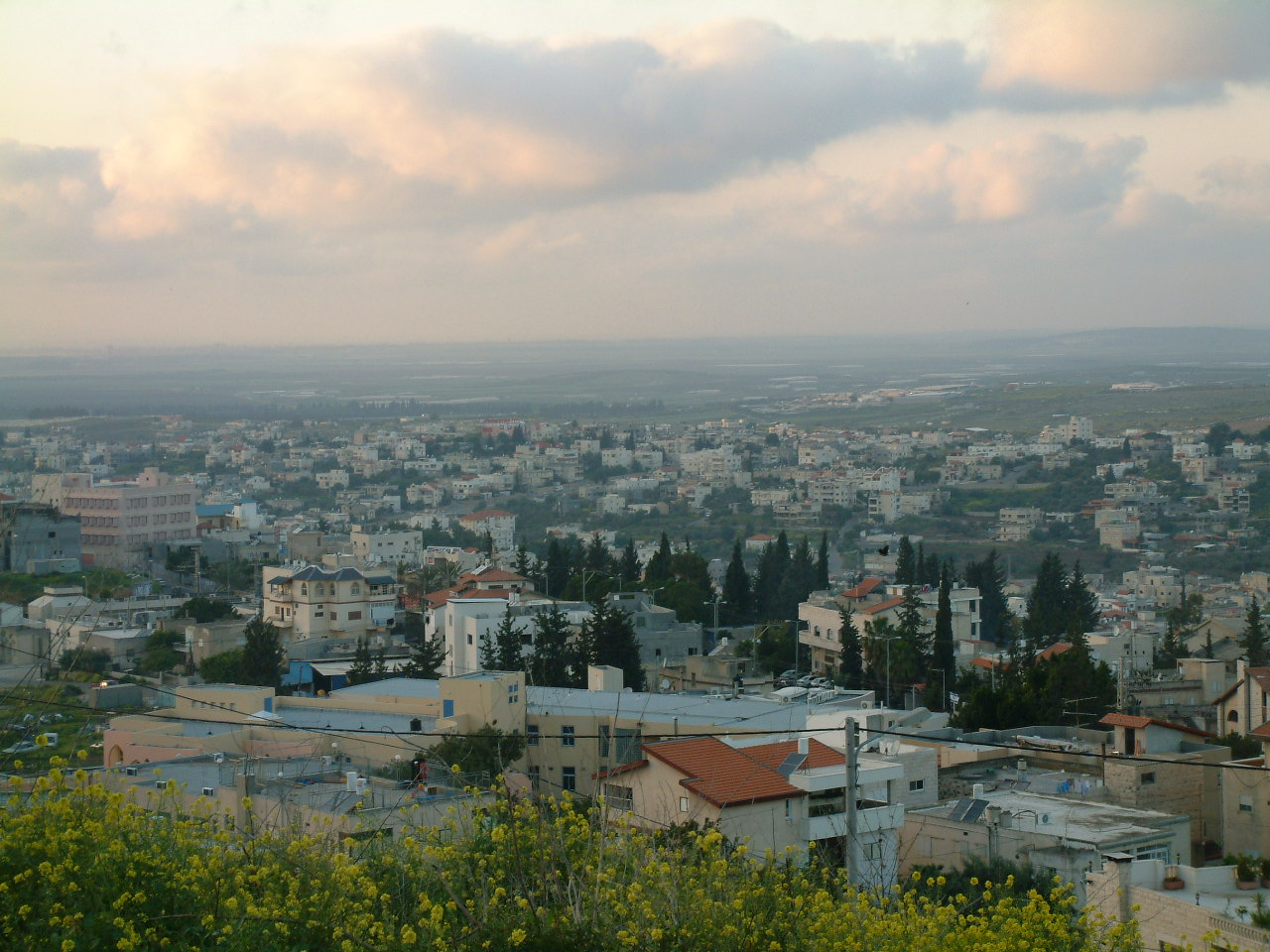
- View of Shefa-Amr
- Interactive map of Shefar'am Natural Region
- Country: Israel
- District: Northern
- Subdistrict: Acre
- Largest City: Shefa-Amr

Area
  - Total: 249 km^{2} (96 sq mi)

Population (2024)
  - Total: 237,934

Ethnicity
  - Jews and others: 5.4%
  - Arabs: 94.3%

The Shefar'am Natural Region is a natural region in the Acre Subdistrict, in the Northern District of Israel. Shefa-Amr is the largest city in the natural region.

== Geography ==
Districts, Subdistricts and Natural Regions of the State of Israel, 2018

The natural region consists of a wide swath of small cities and towns in the Lower Galilee, stretching from the Beit Netofa Valley almost to Karmiel, and from Highway 70 on the west to Deir Hana on the east. It has an area of 249 km^{2}. It is the most populous natural region in the Acre subdistrict. The largest city is Shefa-Amr, at the western end of the natural region, but it also contains several other large towns, including Tamra, Kafr Manda, Sakhnin, and Arraba. Tel Yodfat National Park is also located here. It contains a portion of the Misgav Regional Council.

== Demographics ==
At 94 percent Arab, the natural region has the largest proportion of Arabs of any natural region outside the Golan Heights. Every city or town in the natural region with more than 2,000 people is inhabited by Arabs, and roughly 11 percent of Israel's Arab population lives in the natural region. The largest Jewish town is Moreshet, with a population of 1,610.

Historical population
Year	Pop.	±%
1972	52,500	—
1983	83,300	+58.7%
1995	123,300	+48.0%
2008	182,680	+48.2%
2022	228,969	+25.3%
2024	237,934	+3.9%

== Administrative local authorities ==
Cities	Local Councils	Villages
Arraba; Sakhnin; Shefa-'Amr; Tamra	Bir al-Maksur; Deir Hanna; I'billin; Kabul; Kafr Manda; Kaukab Abu al-Hija; Sha'ab	Misgav; Arab al-Na'im; Atzmon Segev; Avtalion; Dmeide; Eshbal; Eshhar; Hararit; Koranit; Manof; Mitzpe Aviv; Moreshet; Rakefet; Shekhanya; Ya'ad; Yodfat; Yuvalim

== Voting Patterns ==
In the 2022 election, 87 percent of voters in the natural region voted for the Arab parties, while 10 percent voted for the parties of the center-left coalition led by Yair Lapid and 3 percent voted for the parties of the right-wing coalition led by Benjamin Netanyahu. This was the best performance for the Arab parties of any natural region in Israel, as well as the worst performance for both the center-left coalition and right-wing coalition.

In the 2026 election, 88 percent of voters in the natural region voted for the Arab parties, while 10 percent voted for the parties of the center-left coalition led by Gadi Eisenkot and 1.4 percent voted for the parties of the right-wing coalition led by Benjamin Netanyahu. An additional 0.2 percent voted for the Reservists, and another 0.2 percent voted for Amcha Yisrael. This was again the best performance for the Arab parties of any natural region in Israel, as well as the worst performance for the right-wing coalition. Voter turnout increased 45 percent from the 2022 election.
