= Route 784 (Israel) =

Route in northern Israel

Route 784
- כביש 784
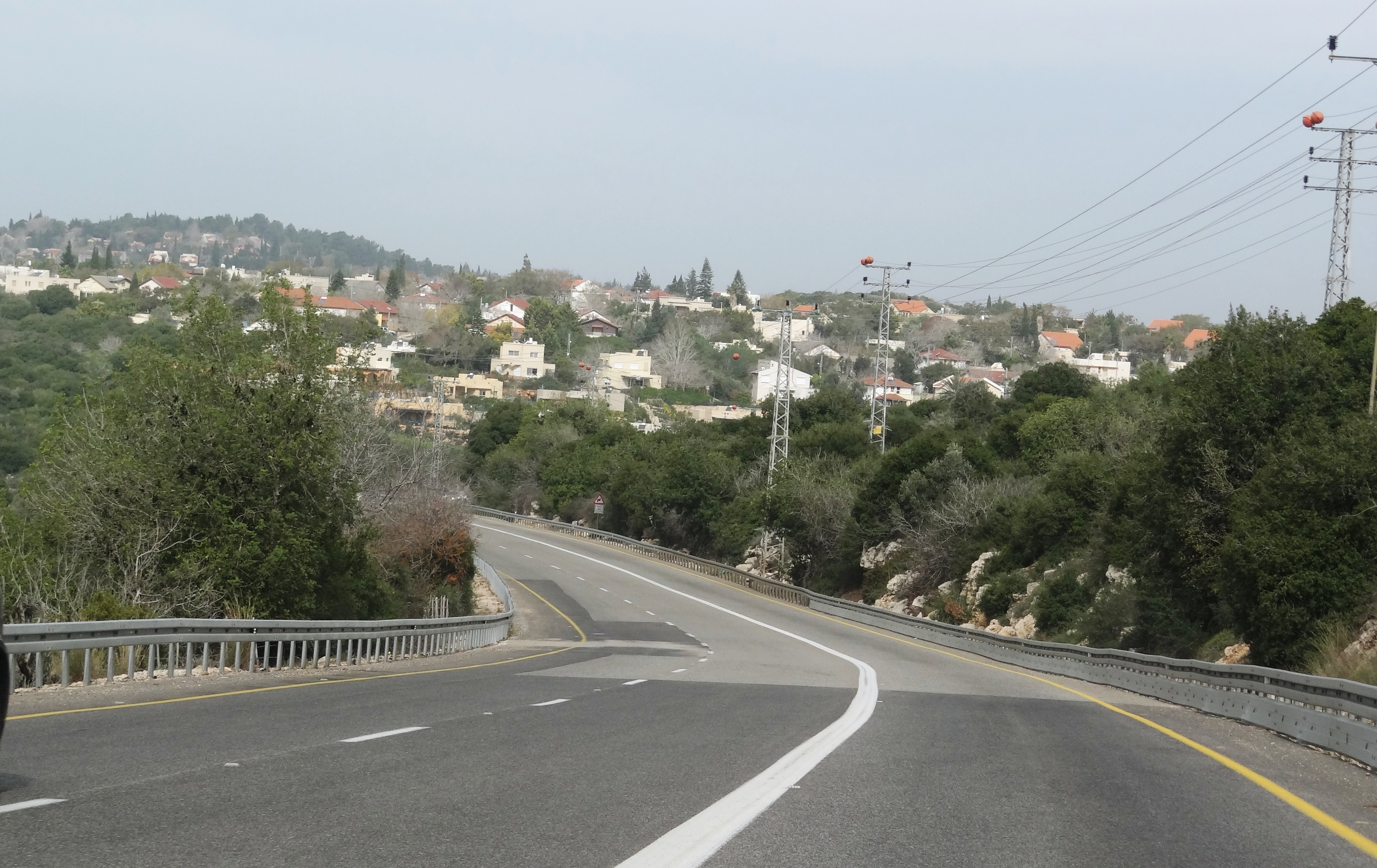
- A view of Rakefet from Route 784.

Route information
- Length: 26 km (16 mi)

Major junctions
- South end: Yiftahel Interchange
- North end: West Karmiel Interchange

Location
- Country: Israel

Highway system
- Roads in Israel; Highways
← Route 781	→ Route 789

Route 784 is a regional highway in Northern Israel, which serves as a main transportation artery for the residents of the Misgav Regional Council and connects the Jezreel Valley with the Galilee settlements by the shortest route. The road starts at the Yiftahel interchange in the south and ends at the West Karmiel interchange in the north. From the Misgav junction to the Yuvalim junction, the road overlaps with Route 805. The length of the road is 26 km (16 mi).

== History ==
The road already appears in the five-year plan for the development of the Galilee from 1966, as a road to connect Nazareth-Karmiel-Ma'alot-Biranit. In the five-year plan, it was proposed to start the paving in sections, the first of which would be:

1. The connection of Highway 79 to Kfar Manda and Yodfat,
2. Connection from Misgav to Karmiel,
3. From Majd al-Krum to Tefen,
4. From Tefen to Ma'alot, a section that at the end of 1966 had already been paved and today is part of Route 854.
5. From Elkosh to Yakinton.

These sections are intended to connect with existing road sections.

The first section of road that was paved, the one that connects Road 7955 with Route 805, was paved to provide access to Yodfat in 1967–1968.

The southern section of the road, from Kfar Manda to Route 79, was opened to traffic in July 1970.

Work on the northern section of the road, between Karmiel and Route 805, began in 1982.

== Junctions (South to North) ==
District	Location	km	mi	Name	Destinations	Notes
Northern	Alon HaGalil	0	0.0	מחלף יפתחאל (Yiftahel Interchange)	Highway 79	
Northern	Hanaton	2	1.2	צומת חנתון (Hanaton Junction)	Entrance to Hanaton	
Northern	Kfar Manda	6	3.7	צומת כפר מנדא (Kfar Manda Junction)	Entrance to Kfar Manda	
Northern	Dmeide	9	5.6	צומת דמיידה (Dmeide Junction)	Entrance to Dmeide	
Northern	Moreshet	11	6.8	צומת מורשת (Moreshet Junction)	Route 781	
Northern	Kaukab Abu al-Hija	13	8.1	צומת כוכב (Kaukab Junction)	Route 232	
Northern	Koranit	13.5	8.4	צומת קורנית (Koranit Junction)	Road 7933	
Northern	Yodfat	14	8.7	צומת יודפת (Yodfat Junction)	Road 7955	
Northern	Rakefet	17	11	צומת משגב (Misgav Junction)	Route 805	Western end of concurrency with Route 805
Northern	Yuvalim	17.5	10.9	צומת יובלים (Yuvalim Junction)	Route 805	Eastern end of concurrency with Route 805
Northern	Shorashim	21	13	צומת שורשים (Shorashim Junction)	Entrance to Shorashim	
Northern	Karmiel	25	16	מחלף מוטה גור (Motta Gur Interchange)	Nesi'ei Israel Blvd.	
Northern	Karmiel	26	16	מחלף כרמיאל מערב (West Karmiel Interchange)	Highway 85	
1.000 mi = 1.609 km; 1.000 km = 0.621 mi: Concurrency terminus

== Gallery ==
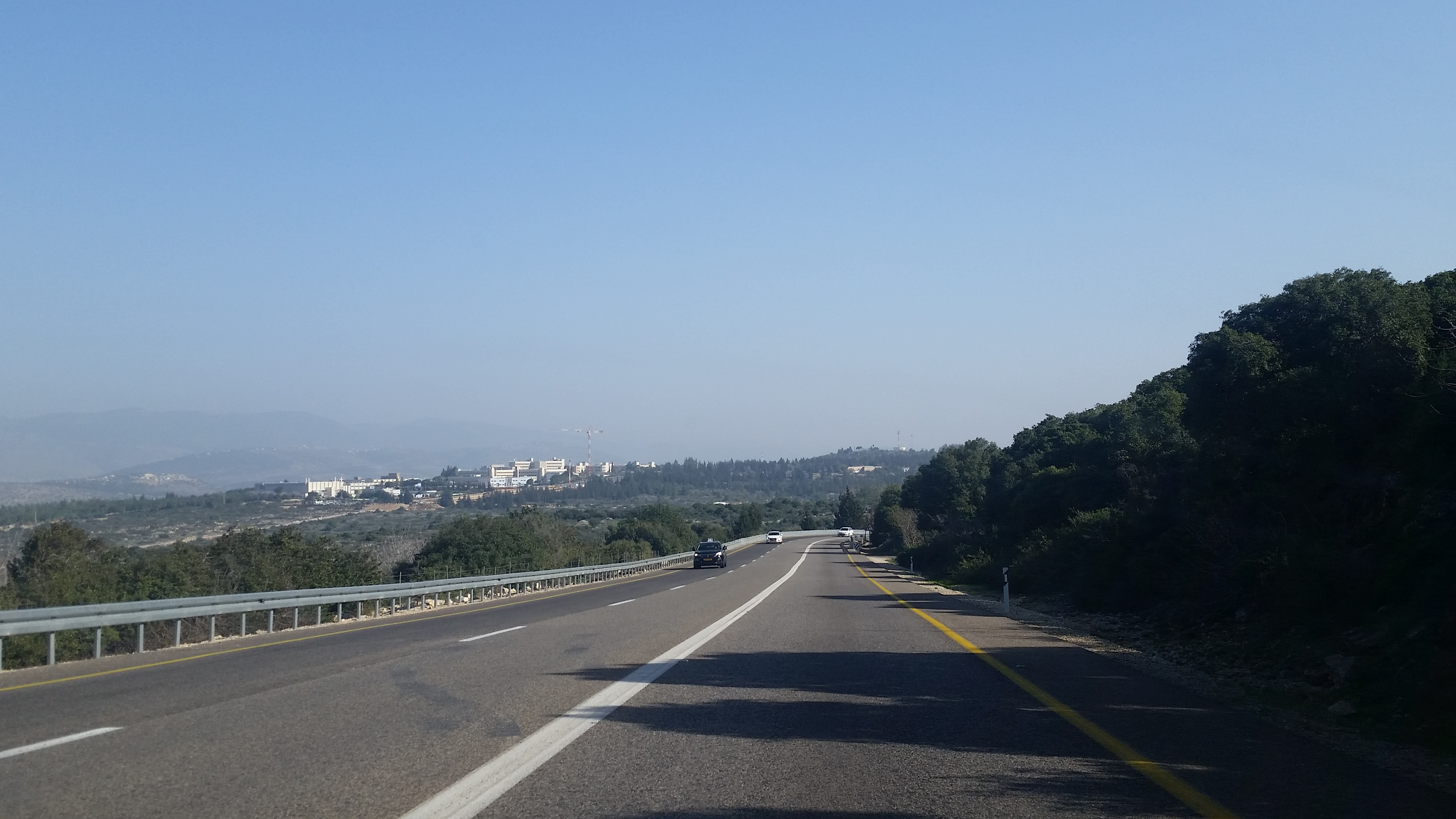
Route 784 between the Yodfat junction and the Rafael junction. In the background on the ridge are the buildings of Rafael.

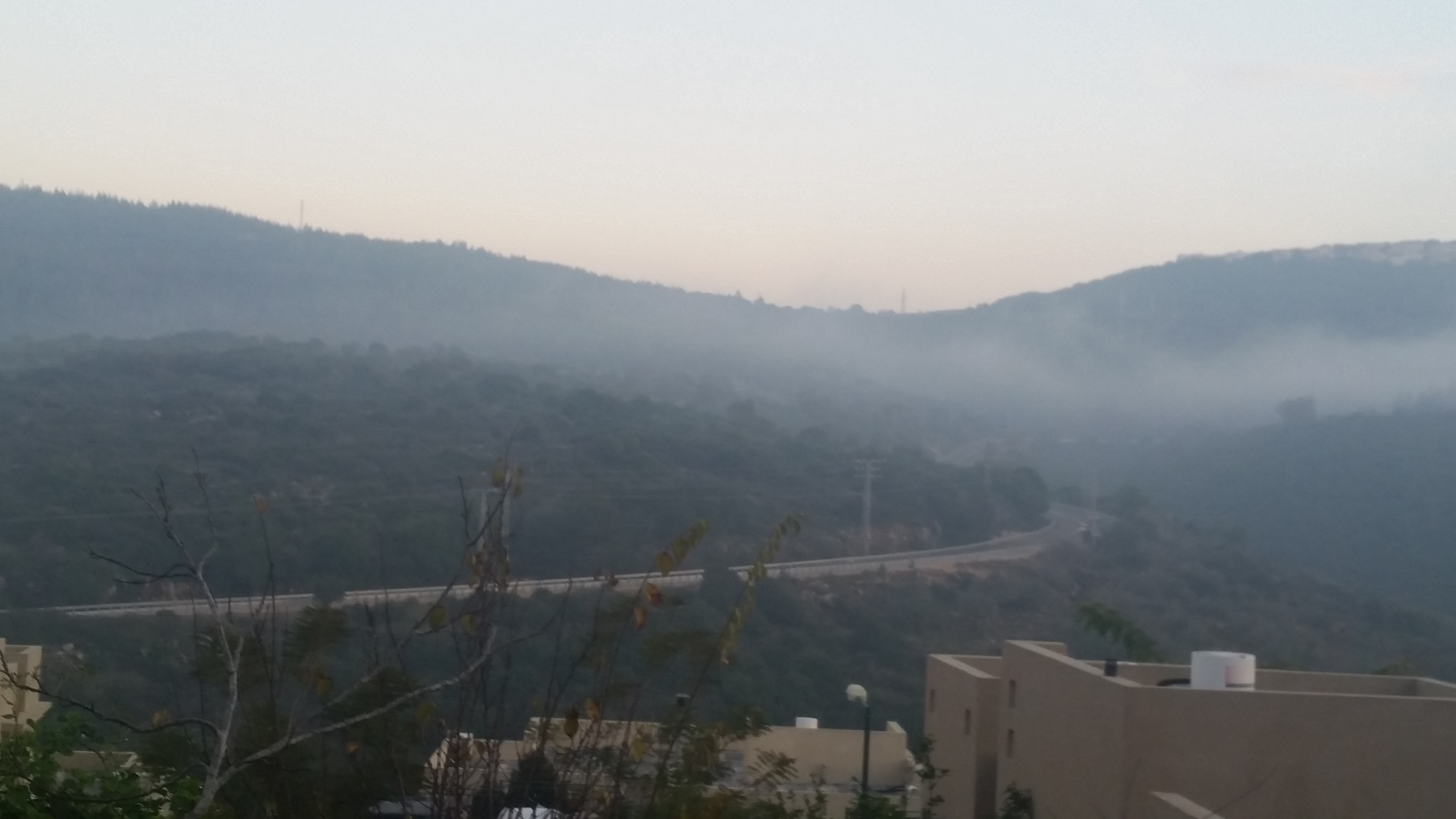
Route 784 in the section going down from the Yodfat junction to the Rakefet junction. Photo from Rakefet from the East.

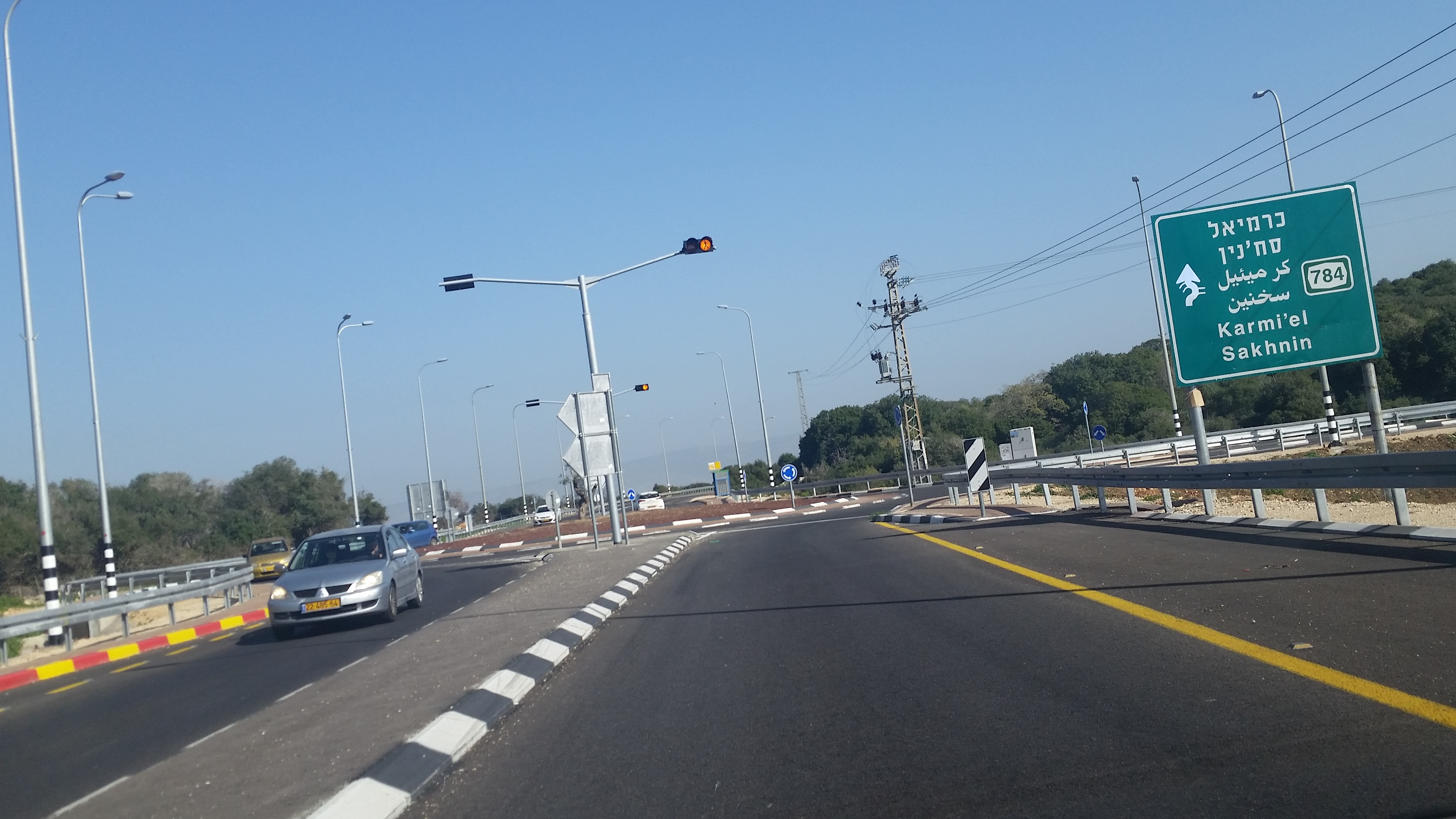
Yodfat junction looks from the direction of the Morshet junction.

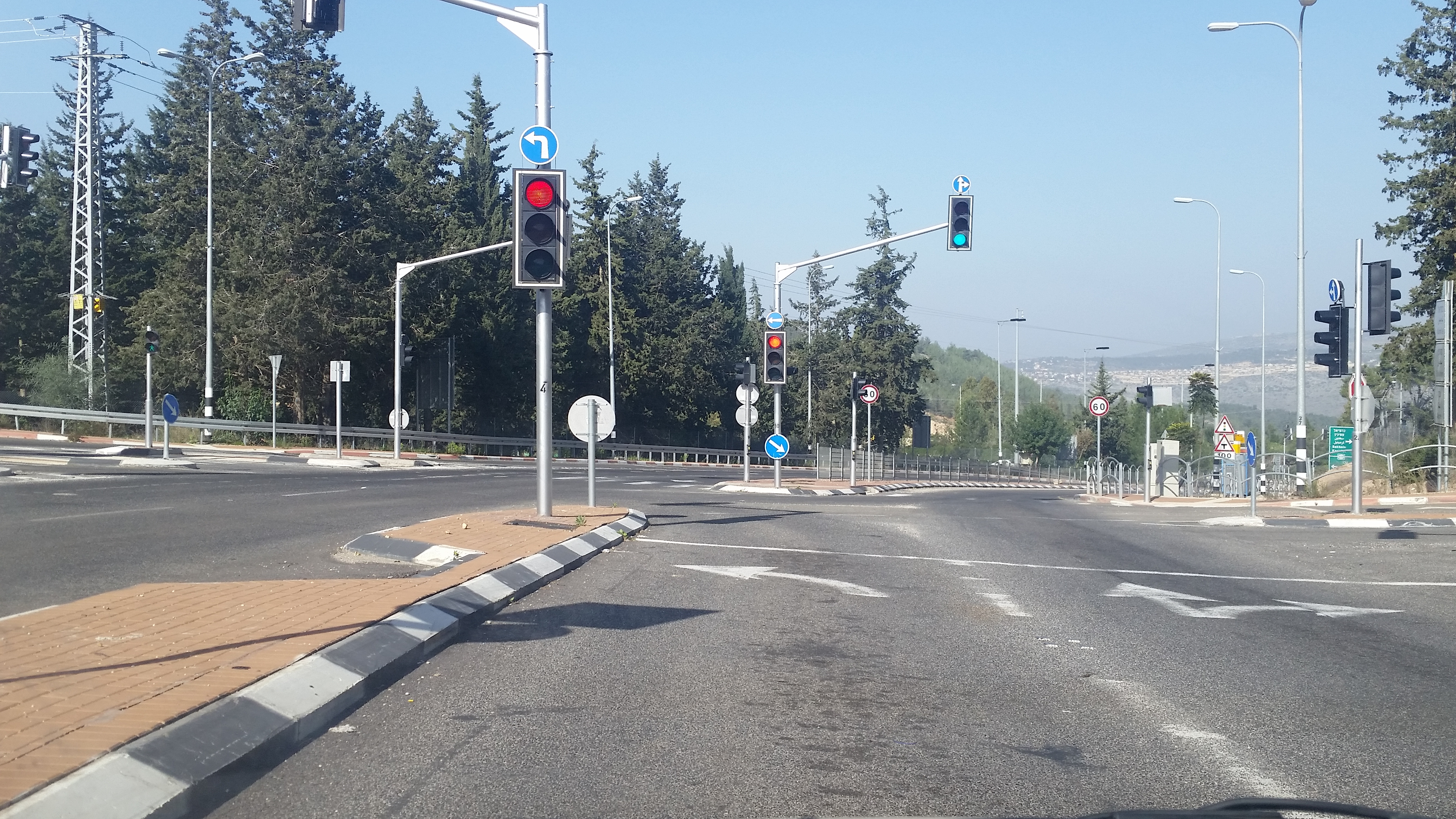
Misgav junction from Yodafat junction.

== See also ==
- List of highways in Israel
