= Mount Atzmon =

Mountain in Israel

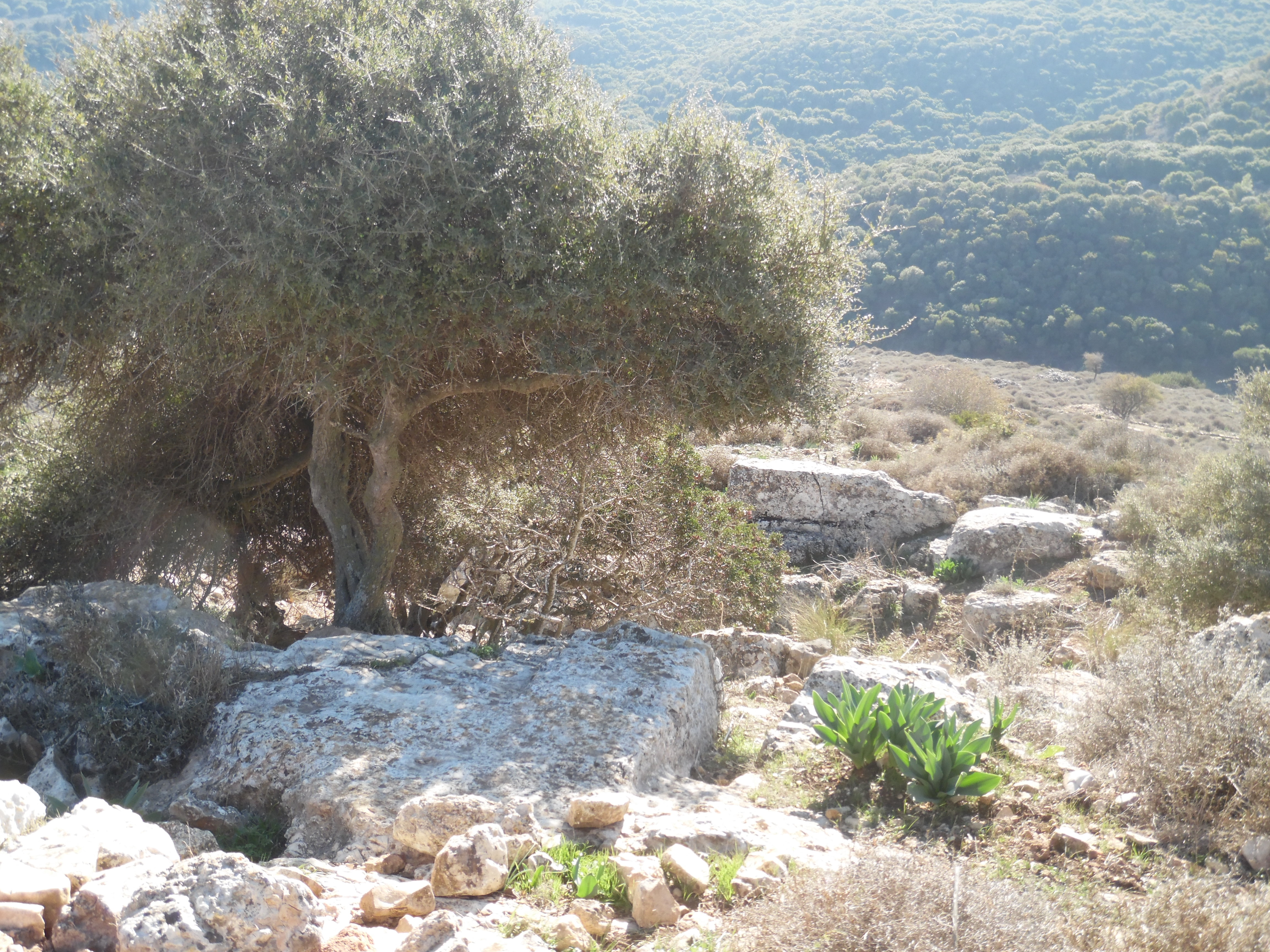

Highest point
- Elevation: 547 m (1,795 ft)
- Coordinates: 32°49′27″N 35°15′58″E

Naming
- Native name: הר עצמון (Hebrew)

Geography
- Location within Northwest Israel Location within Israel
- Country: Israel
- District: Northern District

Mount Atzmon is the modern Israeli name of a mountain in the Northern District of Israel, identified by some with the ancient Mount Atzmon. Its Arabic name is Jebel Didiba or Jebel Didbeh.

At the foot of the mountain are the Arab town of Kafr Manda, and the archaeological site of Jotapata (modern-day Yodfat), where Jewish forces led by Josephus made their last stand against the Romans.

== Name ==
Among the Arabs, the mountain was known as Jabal Didaba or Didbeh, which in Persian means "guardian" or "watcher".

== Identification with ancient Mount Atzmon: pros and cons ==
Some scholars have identified the mountain as "Mount Atzmon" (Asamon), mentioned by Jewish-Roman historian Josephus as a mountain in central Galilee, overlooking Sepphoris (Tzipori), where several thousand Jews took refuge during the Great Revolt (66–70), and where they were eventually killed by the Romans. In his 1879 lexicon of Josephus' works, Gustav Böttger identified Mount Meron as Josephus' Mount Atzmon.

However, during the British Mandate, it was Mount Meron that was known as "Mount Atzmon" and was therefore referred to as the "historical Mount Atzmon". In 1953, the Government Names Committee determined that the name "Mount Atzmon" should not be used in reference to Mount Meron and that it should be reserved for Jebel Didbeh (Didaba).

Gustav Dalman (1855-1941) identified Atzmon as "Ras Kroman" from the western part of Eilabun (in Beit Netofa Valley, Lower Galilee).

== See also ==
- The nearby Beit Netofa Valley
