= Mohammad Ali Taha =

- محمد علي طه
- Born: 1941 (age 84–85); Mi‘ar, Galilee
- Occupation: Writer

Mohammad Ali Taha (Arabic: محمد علي طه; 1941 in Mi‘ar, Galilee) is a Palestinian writer, storyteller, novelist, playwright, children's literature and essay writer, and political activist.

== Biography ==
He was born in 1941 in the village of Mi‘ar near Acre. After the village was occupied and destroyed during the 1948 war, he and his family fled to southern Lebanon, later returning to the village of Sakhnin. In 1951, the family moved to the village of Kabul, near depopulated Mi‘ar, where he still lives with his family.

He attended elementary schools in Mi‘ar, Sakhnin, Kabul, Tamra, and later completed secondary school at Kufr Yasif High School (September 1956 – June 1960). He studied Arabic literature and history at the University of Haifa (1970–1974), earning his B.A. in 1974. He then worked as an Arabic language and literature teacher at the Arab Orthodox College in Haifa for 25 years (1973–1998).

He became involved in political work with the Israeli Communist Party in the late 1970s, serving as a member of the party from 1977 to 1992 and as a member of its Central Committee.

He was among the founders of the Land Defense Committee, which declared the first Land Day strike on March 30, 1976.

He served as cultural editor of Al-Ittihad newspaper (Haifa), published by the Communist Party (1982–1990), then became editor-in-chief of the literary magazine Al-Jadid (1990–1992).

In 1978, he participated in establishing the Union of Palestinian Writers in Israel and was elected its Secretary General. In 1991, he was elected President of the Union and was the chief editor of 48 Magazine, published by the Writers’ Union.

In 1998, he was elected Chairman of the “Committee for the Commemoration of the Nakba and Steadfastness,” which organized extensive activities marking the 50th anniversary of the Palestinian Nakba. Its efforts culminated in the “March of Return” from Nazareth to the depopulated village of Saffuriya on May 15, 1998, attended by thousands of Palestinians inside Israel.

He later became head of the “National Reconciliation Committee” of Palestinian citizens of Israel, which oversaw the establishment of the Joint List for the elections in 2015, and again in 2020 and 2021.

He was repeatedly subjected to persecution and arrest. Israeli authorities confiscated his short story collection A Rose for Hafiza’s Eyes and arrested him in 1983.

He was a member of the Palestine Prize Committee in 2019 and served as its chairman in 2020. He has also been a member of the executive committee of the Mahmoud Darwish Foundation in Ramallah since its establishment.

Awards and Honors

- Jerusalem Medal for Culture and Arts from President Yasser Arafat (Jan 1, 1997)
- Honorary Doctorate from Ovidius University, Romania (May 4, 2004)
- Diwan Al-Arab Prize for Children's Literature (Egypt, 2005–2006)
- Medal of Merit and Distinction from President Mahmoud Abbas (Jan 6, 2013)
- Palestine Prize for Literature (2015)
- Creativity Prize from the Academy of the Arabic Language, Nazareth (2017)

== Writings and Contributions ==
He published a weekly political-literary column in Al-Ittihad (Haifa), Kul al-Arab (Nazareth), and Al-Hayat al-Jadida (Ramallah).

He wrote short stories and is regarded by critics as a pioneer of the Palestinian short story and one of the foremost Arab short story writers. Critics called him “Dean of the Palestinian Short Story,” “the Satirical Writer,” and “the writer whose stories carry the scent of Palestine.”

He also wrote novels, plays, autobiographical works, and children's stories. His writings reflect the Palestinian rural environment, the daily life of ordinary people, the struggles of Palestinians in refugee camps, and their fight for survival, steadfastness, homeland, freedom, and independence.

His works have been translated into many languages, including Hebrew, English, German, Italian, Russian, French, Polish, Bulgarian, Romanian, Spanish, and Japanese.

A Hebrew-language collection of his stories, The Rooted in the Land (הנטועים באדמה), was published by Achshav publishing house. Another collection, The Cursed (לשכת המקוללים), was published by the Van Leer Institute in Jerusalem and Pardes Publishing as part of the Maktoub series.

Numerous academic studies have been written on his works, including a doctoral dissertation in German at the University of Berlin by poet Ali al-Sah. Four books have been published on his literary contributions:

1. Tracking the Trace: Foundations of the Short Story Experience of Mohammad Ali Taha by Dr. Ibrahim Taha.

2. Mohammad Ali Taha: A Creative Writer in Dialogue with Words by Dr. Nabih al-Qasim.

3. Reality and Imagination: The Literary World of Mohammad Ali Taha by Dr. Riyad Kamil.

4. Longing for Honey: Essays and Studies in the Literature of Mohammad Ali Taha by Dr. Mohammad Hamad.

More than 30 well-known critics have written about his works, including Dr. Mahmoud Amin al-‘Alim, Dr. Faisal Darraj, Dr. Nabih al-Qasim, Dr. Riyad Kamil, Dr. Ibrahim Taha, Dr. Emil Touma, Dr. Mahmoud Ghanayem, Dr. Ibrahim Khalil, Dr. Habib Boulos, Dr. Hussein Jum‘a, Dr. Hussein Hamza, Dr. Farouq Muwassi, Dr. Aida Fakhmawi, Dr. Rabab Hussein, Dr. Maysa al-Sah, Dr. Lina al-Sheikh Hishmeh, Dr. Ola ‘Uwaida, Dr. Rawiya Barbara, Ahmad Dahbour, Mahmoud Shuqair, Fakhri Saleh, Anton Shalhat, Nida Khoury, Farida al-Naqqash, and others.

== Published Works ==
Short Stories

1. So That the Sun Rises

2. Peace and Greetings

3. A Bridge over the Sad River

4. The Returnee from Mi‘ar Selling Manaqeesh in Tel al-Zaatar

5. A Rose for Hafiza’s Eyes

6. The Returnee and Hafiza

7. And It Shall Be in the Coming Time

8. The Leaning Palm Tree

9. The Boy Who Plucked the Sun

10. Bir al-Safa

11. Wild Honey

12. In Praise of Spring

13. The Teacher of Magical Realism

14. The Man Who Looked for His Back

15. The Complete Short Story Collection (3 volumes)

Novels

1. The Saga of Banu Ballut

2. Nawwar al-‘Ilt

3. Ayn al-Zaytun

4. The Sleep of the Gazelles (Autobiography)

Essays

1. Manaqeesh

2. In Classical Arabic

3. Signs of the Coming Dawn

4. A Walk in a Green Field

5. Those Who Remain Among Us

6. On the Other Bank

Plays

1. The Mint Basin

2. Open Strike

3. Dresses

4. Either This or Nothing

5. The Brother Driving His Sister

Children’s Stories

1. Little Red Riding Hood (Creative Adaptation)

2. The Ugly Duckling (Creative Adaptation)

3. Pinocchio (Creative Adaptation)

4. Cinderella (Creative Adaptation)

5. Princess Rasha

6. King of Fruits

7. The Big Party

8. What Did the Birds Say?

9. The Amazing Little Bird

10. Breakfast Meal

11. The Generous Fish

12. The Cat Who Spoke Two Languages

13. The Brave Mouse

14. The Language of Ḍād (Arabic)

15. Dima and the Goldfinch

16. The Clever Rabbit

17. Princess of the Seasons

18. In the Neighborhood of Professions

He has visited and lectured in many countries, including Egypt, Jordan, Tunisia, Morocco, Syria, Yemen, Bahrain, Russia, China, Canada, Romania, Germany, Italy, Czechia, Slovakia, Bulgaria, Hungary, Latvia, Austria, Switzerland, Belgium, France, Cuba, and others.
