= Bir al-Maksur =

Bir al-Maksur: בִּיר אל-מַכְּסוּר; بئر المكسور
- Local council (from 1990)

Hebrew transcription(s)
  - ISO 259: Bir ˀel-Makksur (Jara'zia)
  - Also spelled: Bir el-Maksur (official); Beer al-Maksura (unofficial)
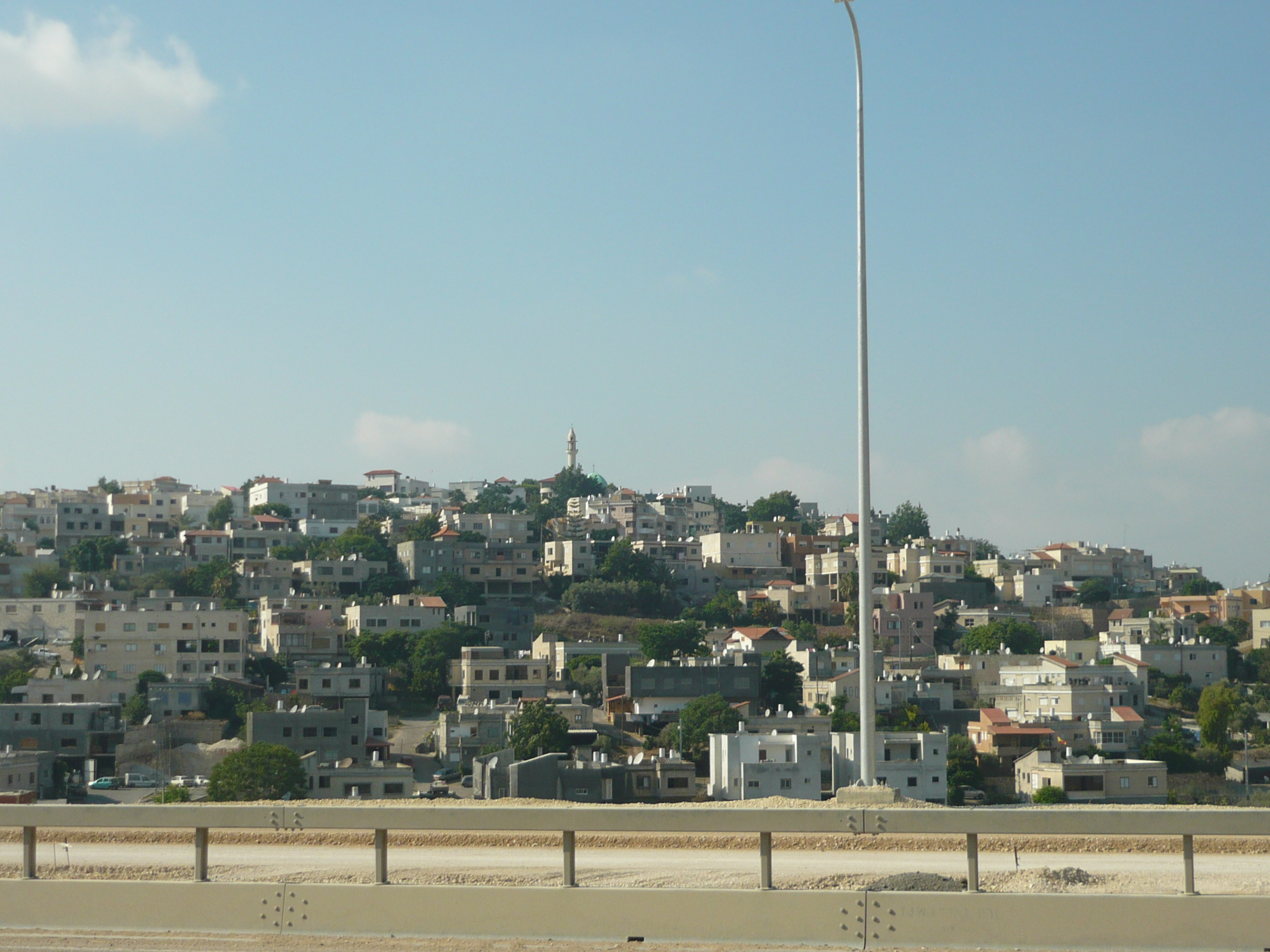
- Bir al-Maksur, 2010

- Location within Northwest Israel
- Coordinates: 32°46′38″N 35°13′15″E
- Country: Israel
- District: Northern
- Subdistrict: Acre
- Natural Region: Shefar'am
- Founded: 1950s

Government
  - Head of Municipality: Hasan Gadeer

Area
  - Total: 4,554 dunams (4.554 km^{2}; 1.758 sq mi)

Population (2024)
  - Total: 11,068
  - Density: 2,430/km^{2} (6,295/sq mi)

Ethnicity
  - Arabs: 99.96%
  - Others: 0.04%
- Name meaning: The Broken Well

Bir al-Maksur or Beer el-Maksura (Arabic: بئر المكسور; Hebrew: בִּיר אל-מַכְּסוּר) is an Arab Bedouin local council in the Northern District of Israel located 15 kilometres (9.3 mi) north-west of Nazareth. In 2024 its population was 11,068. The villagers belong to the Arab el-Hujeirat Bedouin tribe, settled there in the 1950s. In 2022, 100% of the population was Muslim.

== History ==
=== Before Common Era ===
Flint from the Mousterian culture, made with the Levallois technique, in addition to remains from Pre-Pottery Neolithic A and B have been found during excavations.

Sherds from Iron age I, and possibly Iron age II have also been found.

=== Common Era ===
A burial cave, with ceramics and artefacts dating to the late Roman period, that is, 3rd–4th centuries CE, has been unearthed.

In 1881, the PEF's Survey of Western Palestine noted at Kh. el Maksur: "Heaps of stones."

== Demographics ==
Historical population
Year	Pop.	±%
1972	800	—
1983	2,800	+250.0%
1995	5,200	+85.7%
2008	7,400	+42.3%
2022	10,510	+42.0%
2024	11,068	+5.3%

== Voting Patterns ==
In the 2022 election, 93 percent of voters in Bir al-Maksur voted for the Arab parties, while 6 percent voted for the parties of the center-left coalition led by Yair Lapid and 1 percent voted for the parties of the right-wing coalition led by Benjamin Netanyahu. Among the voters for the Arab parties, 95 percent voted for Ra'am, while 2 percent voted for Balad and 2 percent voted for the Hadash–Ta'al list.

In the 2026 election, 88 percent of voters in Bir al-Maksur voted for the Arab parties, while 11 percent voted for the parties of the center-left coalition led by Gadi Eisenkot and 0.4 percent voted for the parties of the right-wing coalition led by Benjamin Netanyahu. Among the voters for the Arab parties, 87 percent voted for Ra'am, while 13 percent voted for the Joint List. Voter turnout increased 44 percent from the 2022 election.

== Notable people ==
- Mohammad Ghadir (born 1991), professional football player who plays for Bnei Yehuda Tel Aviv F.C.

== See also ==
- Arab localities in Israel

== Bibliography ==
- Abu Zidan, Fadi; Mitler, Itamar (2014-08-03). "Bir el-Maksur Final Report". Hadashot Arkheologiyot – Excavations and Surveys in Israel (126).
- Conder, C.R.; Kitchener, HH. (1881). The Survey of Western Palestine: Memoirs of the Topography, Orography, Hydrography, and Archaeology. Vol. 1. London: Committee of the Palestine Exploration Fund.
- Gal, Zvi (1992). Lower Galilee During the Iron Age. Eisenbrauns. ISBN 0931464692.
- Malinski-Buller, Ariel; Aladjem, Emil (2011-12-27). "Bir el-Maksur Preliminary Report". Hadashot Arkheologiyot – Excavations and Surveys in Israel (123).
- Palmer, E.H. (1881). The Survey of Western Palestine: Arabic and English Name Lists Collected During the Survey by Lieutenants Conder and Kitchener, R. E. Transliterated and Explained by E.H. Palmer. Committee of the Palestine Exploration Fund.
- Yaroshevich, Alla (2013-10-02). "Bir el-Maksur Final Report". Hadashot Arkheologiyot – Excavations and Surveys in Israel (125).
