= Mi'ar =

Palestinian village located 17.5 kilometers east of Acre

Mi'ar ميعار
- Village
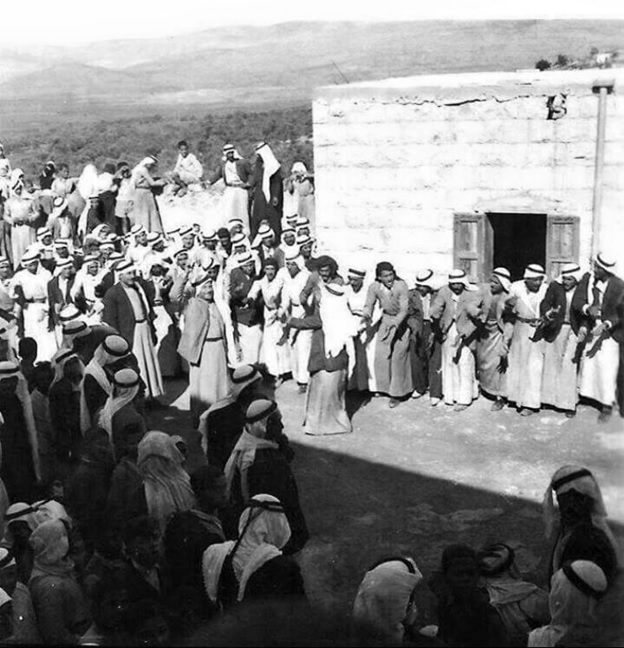
- A Palestinian wedding celebration in Mi'ar in 1937
- Etymology: From personal name
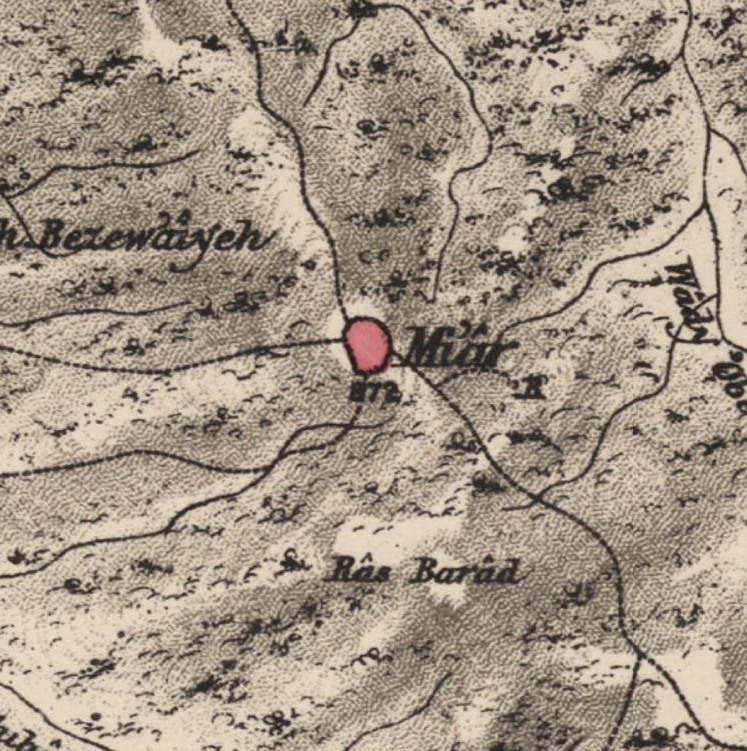
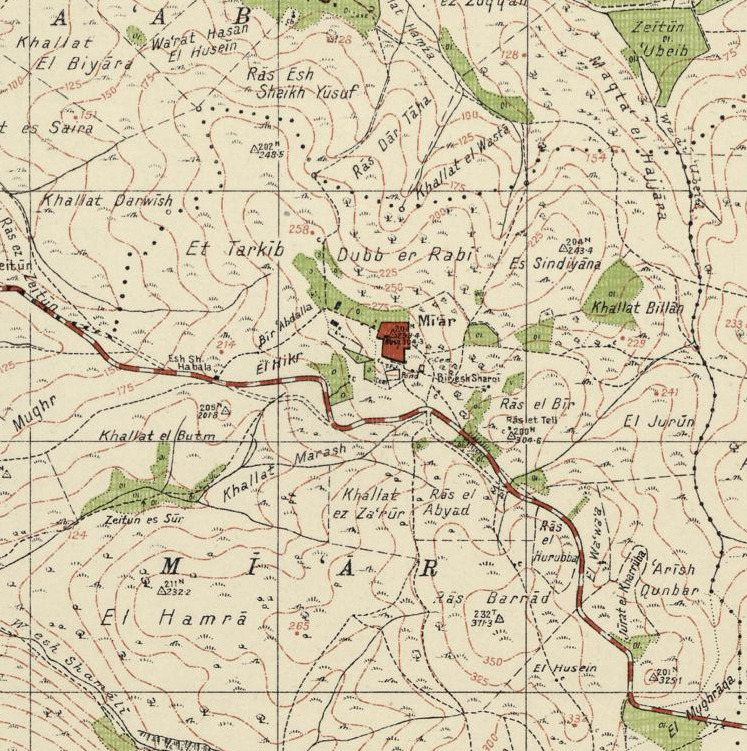
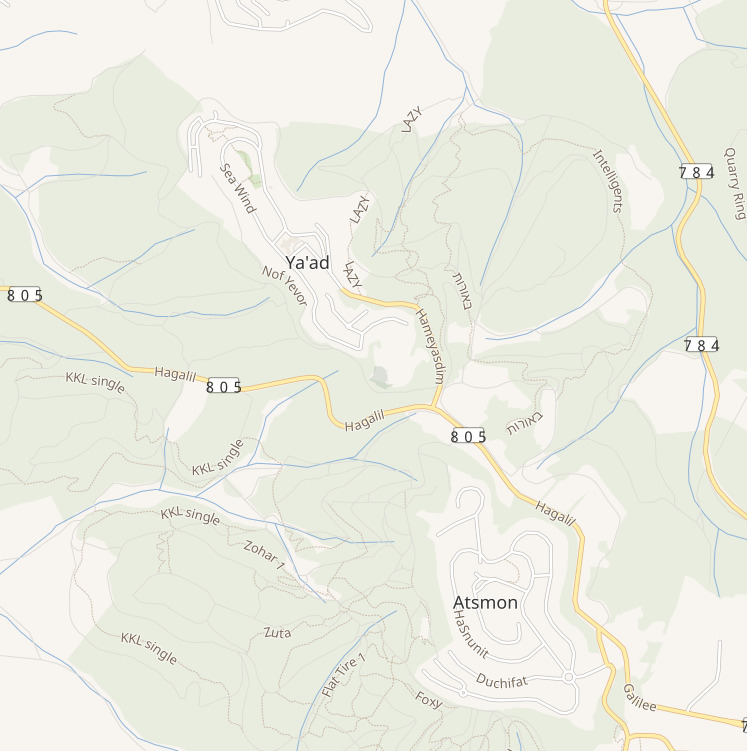
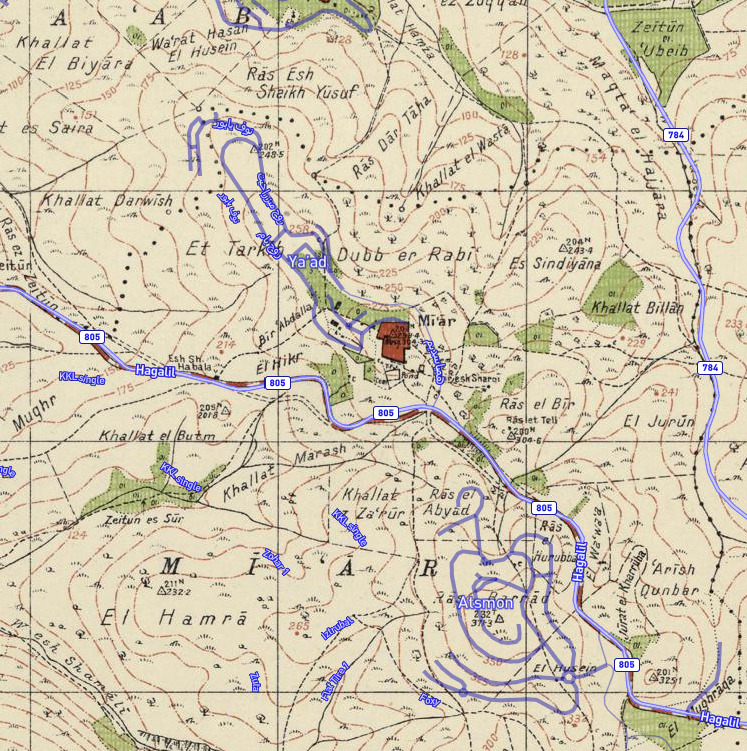
- 1870s map 1940s map modern map 1940s with modern overlay map A series of historical maps of the area around Mi'ar

- Location within Mandatory Palestine
- Coordinates: 32°52′27″N 35°14′47″E
- Palestine grid: 173/253
- Geopolitical entity: Mandatory Palestine
- Subdistrict: Acre
- Date of depopulation: 15–18 July 1948

Area
  - Total: 10,788 dunams (10.788 km^{2}; 4.165 sq mi)

Population (1944)
  - Total: 770
- Cause(s) of depopulation: Military assault by Yishuv forces
- Current Localities: Segev, Ya'ad Manof

Mi'ar (Arabic: ميعار), was a Palestinian village located 17.5 kilometers east of Acre. Its population in 1945 was 770. The Crusaders referred to it as "Myary". By the 19th century, during Ottoman rule, it was a large Muslim village. The village was a center of Palestinian Arab rebel operations during the 1936–39 Arab revolt in Palestine against British rule and consequently the village was completely dynamited by the British. Mi'ar was later restored, but it was depopulated by Israeli forces during the 1948 Arab-Israeli War. The Jewish communities of Atzmon, Ya'ad and Manof are located on former village land.

== History ==
=== Middle Ages ===
Mi'ar contained the archaeological remains of buildings, fragments of columns, olive presses, and cisterns. It was referred to by the Crusaders as "Myary".

=== Ottoman era ===
Incorporated into the Ottoman Empire in 1517 with all of Palestine, Mi'ar appeared in the 1596 tax registers as being in the Akka Nahiya (Subdistrict of Acre), part of the Safad Sanjak (District of Safed). It had a population 10 Muslim households, an estimated 55 persons. The villagers paid fixed tax rate of 25% on wheat and barley, fruit, goats and beehives; a total of 1,235 akçe.

In the late 1700, the Italian traveler Giovanni Mariti noted that around al-Damun and Mi'ar were two "delightful valleys, ornamented with groves and wild shrubs. The peasants who live in the hamlets around, enjoy a most pleasant situation."

In 1875, French explorer Victor Guérin visited Mi'ar, and noted that it contained "several trunks of columns, three broken capitals, and a certain number old cut stones, coming from some ancient building. I observed also many blocks of ancient appearance disposed round threshing-floors. There are also cisterns, walls, and caves cut in the rock, which belong to times more or less remote." He found Mi'ar to be inhabited by 500 Muslims.

In 1881, the PEF's Survey of Western Palestine (SWP) described it as a large village situated on high ground that was rough and uncultivated. The villagers, whose number was estimated to be 1,500 (in 1859), cultivated some 30 faddans. A population list from about 1887 showed that Mi'ar had about 480 inhabitants; all Muslims. An elementary school was founded by the Ottomans in 1888, however, it closed its doors in the final years of the Empire.

=== British Mandate era ===
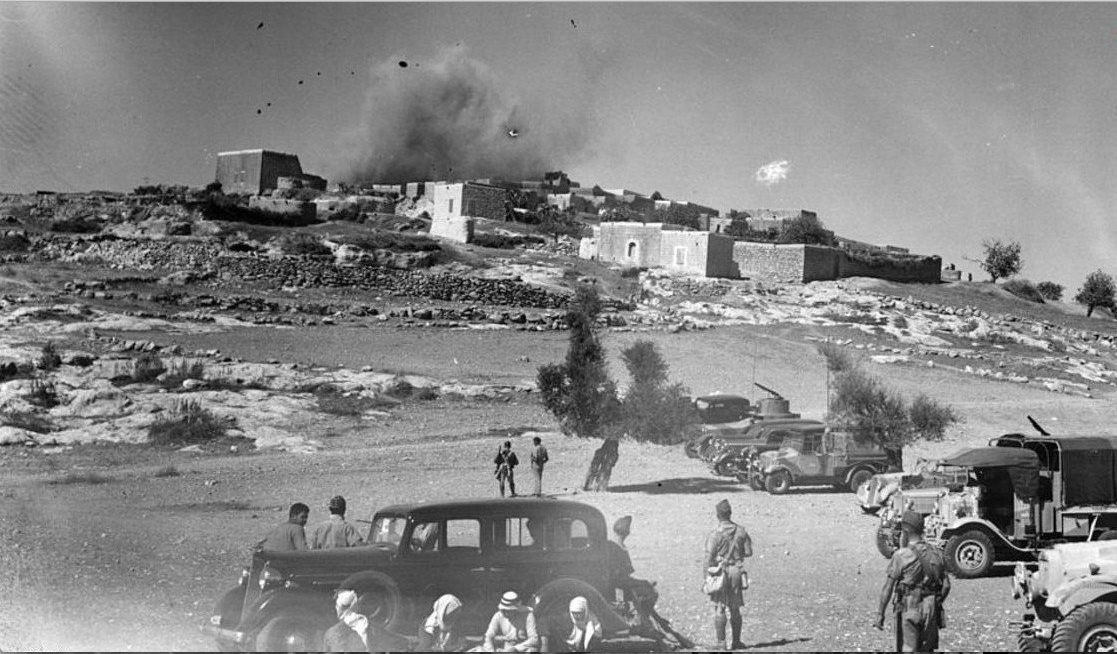
Mi'ar being blown up by the British in 1938.

British forces drove out the Ottomans in 1917, during World War I, and the British Mandate of Palestine was established in 1920. In the 1922 British census, Mi'ar had a population of 429 Muslims. The population increased to 543, still all Muslim, in the 1931 census and the inhabitants lived in a total of 109 houses.

A number of Mi'ar's residents participated in 1936–1939 Arab revolt against British rule and mass Jewish immigration in Palestine, and the village became a center of rebel operations in the Galilee. The rebels often opened fired on British troops passing near Mi'ar, damaged roads in the vicinity to render them impassable by the British authorities, cut electrical cables, and planted landmines to hit British vehicles. One of the authorities' controversial methods of suppressing the revolt was the blowing up of houses in a village where there was support for rebels. On 26 October 1938, two British battalions launched a raid against Mi'ar and began dynamiting the large houses of the village. They then demanded Mi'ar's mukhtar (headman) to issue a call to the village's rebels to surrender their rifles or else the dynamiting would continue. No rifles were surrendered and the British resumed their dynamiting of the village's homes. Mi'ar was entirely destroyed for its alleged support of the rebels. A New York Times reporter present during the destruction wrote, "When the [British] troops left, there was little else remaining of this once busy village except a pile of mangled masonry."

The village was rebuilt and in the 1945 statistics, the population of Mi'ar grew to 770, all Muslims. A total of 2,878 dunams of village land was used for cereals, while 113 dunams were irrigated or used for orchards.

=== 1948 War and aftermath ===
According to Ilan Pappé, on 20 June 1948 Israeli troops entered Mi'ar and shot indiscriminately against its residents while they were working in their fields, the village's houses were destroyed and forty inhabitants were killed. One witness to the Israeli attack was the Palestinian writer, Muhammad Ali Taha, then a 17-year-old boy. Mi'ar's residents later returned and continued living in the village until Israeli troops from the Sheva Brigade reoccupied it on 15 July 1948, as part of the second stage of Operation Dekel. According to Benny Morris, Mi'ar's 893 inhabitants fled during the Israeli assault, while Pappé asserts that they were expelled.

The Jewish communities of Segev (now Atzmon), Ya'ad and Manof were built on Mi'ar's lands. The village's remains in 1992 consisted of "some truncated stone walls, simple graves, and fig and olive trees". The site, which "was largely covered by cypress trees" had become a recreational area.

Many of the refugees of Mi'ar became internally displaced Palestinians resettled in nearby Kabul, Sha'ab and Arraba. Neighborhoods in each of the villages where Mi'ar refugees and their descendants reside are named Mi'ari after their village of origin.

== See also ==
- Depopulated Palestinian locations in Israel

== Bibliography ==
- Barron, J.B., ed. (1923). Palestine: Report and General Abstracts of the Census of 1922. Government of Palestine.
- Bethell, N. (1979). The Palestine Triangle: The Struggle for the Holy Land, 1935-48. Putnam. "Miar."
- Boqa'i, Nihad (2005). "Patterns of Internal Displacement, Social Adjustment and the Challenge of Return". In Masalha, Nur (ed.). Catastrophe Remembered: Palestine, Israel and the Internal Refugees. New York: Zed Books. pp. 73–112. ISBN 1-84277-622-3.
- Conder, C.R.; Kitchener, H.H. (1881). The Survey of Western Palestine: Memoirs of the Topography, Orography, Hydrography, and Archaeology. Vol. 1. London: Committee of the Palestine Exploration Fund.
- Government of Palestine, Department of Statistics (1945). Village Statistics, April, 1945.
- Guérin, V. (1880). Description Géographique Historique et Archéologique de la Palestine (in French). Vol. 3: Galilee, pt. 1. Paris: L'Imprimerie Nationale.
- Hadawi, S. (1970). Village Statistics of 1945: A Classification of Land and Area ownership in Palestine. Palestine Liberation Organization Research Center.
- Hütteroth, W.-D.; Abdulfattah, K. (1977). Historical Geography of Palestine, Transjordan and Southern Syria in the Late 16th Century. Erlanger Geographische Arbeiten, Sonderband 5. Erlangen, Germany: Vorstand der Fränkischen Geographischen Gesellschaft. ISBN 3-920405-41-2.
- Khalidi, W. (1992). All That Remains: The Palestinian Villages Occupied and Depopulated by Israel in 1948. Washington D.C.: Institute for Palestine Studies. ISBN 0-88728-224-5.
- Mariti, G. (1792). Travels Through Cyprus, Syria, and Palestine; with a General History of the Levant. Vol. 1. Dublin: P. Byrne.
- Mills, E., ed. (1932). Census of Palestine 1931. Population of Villages, Towns and Administrative Areas. Jerusalem: Government of Palestine.
- Morris, B. (2004). The Birth of the Palestinian Refugee Problem Revisited. Cambridge University Press. ISBN 0-521-00967-7.
- Palmer, E.H. (1881). The Survey of Western Palestine: Arabic and English Name Lists Collected During the Survey by Lieutenants Conder and Kitchener, R. E. Transliterated and Explained by E.H. Palmer. Committee of the Palestine Exploration Fund.
- Pappé, I. (2007). The ethnic cleansing of Palestine. (reprint). Oneworld Publications Limited. ISBN 978-1-78074-056-0.
- Rhode, H. (1979). Administration and Population of the Sancak of Safed in the Sixteenth Century (PhD). Columbia University. Archived from the original on 2020-03-01.
- Schumacher, G. (1888). "Population list of the Liwa of Akka". Quarterly Statement - Palestine Exploration Fund. 20: 169–191.
