= Atzmon =

Place in Northern Israel

Atzmon: עצמון (Hebrew)
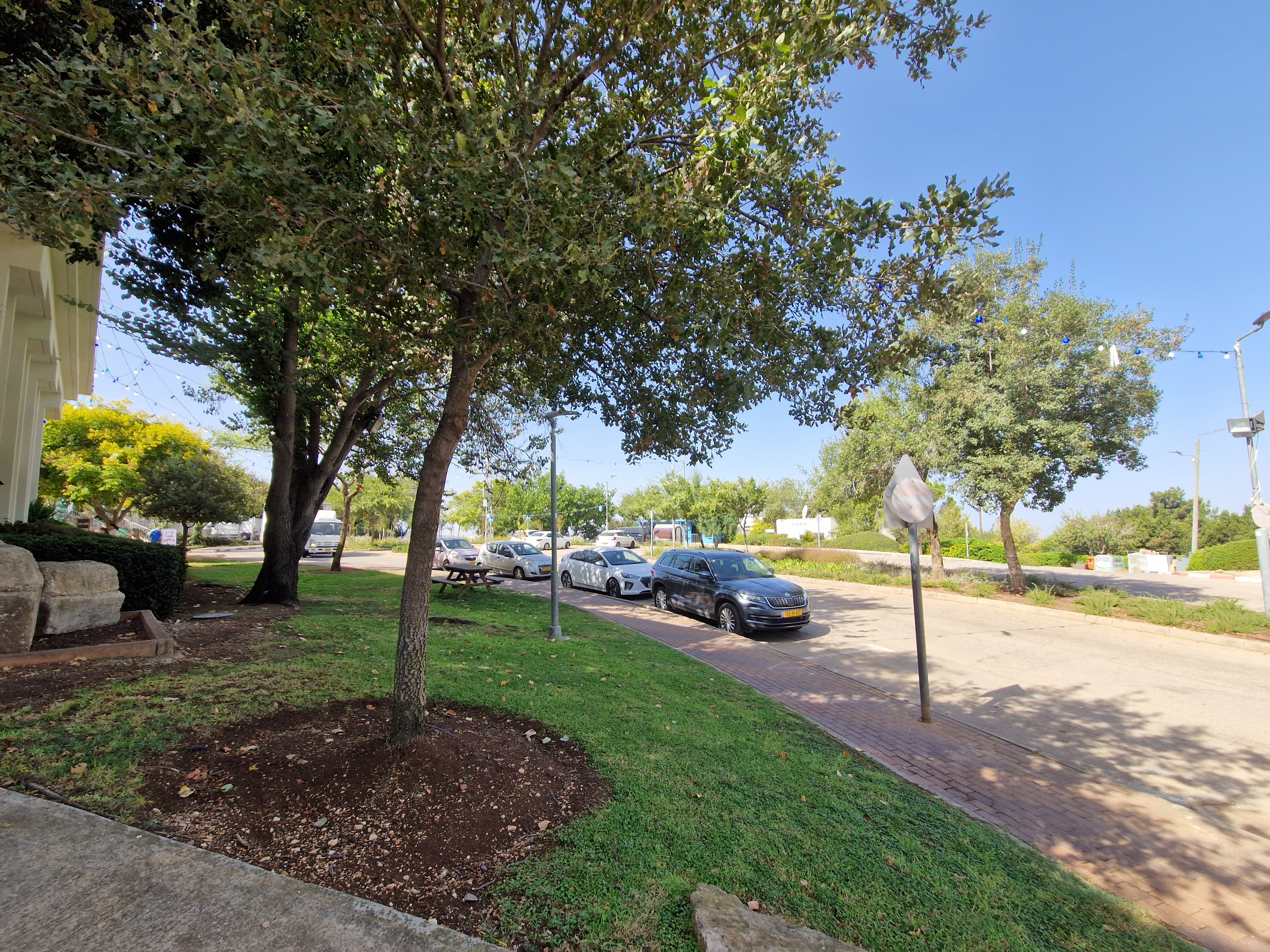

- Location within Northwest Israel Location within Israel
- Coordinates: 32°51′59″N 35°15′5″E
- Country: Israel
- District: Northern
- Subdistrict: Acre
- Council: Misgav
- Founded: 1953
- Population (2024): 1,259

Atzmon (Hebrew: עצמון), formerly known as Segev, is a community settlement in Gush Segev in the Galilee, part of the Misgav Regional Council. In 2024 it had a population of 1,259.

== History ==
Atzmon was established (under the name of Segev) in 1953 on land near the former Palestinian village of Mi'ar, which had been depopulated in the 1948 Arab-Israeli War. Atzmon/Segev was established east of the village site.

After the establishment of Israel in 1948, the Jewish National Fund initiated the establishment of "working villages" to providing housing and employment for the large influx of new immigrants. Segev was founded in 1957 as one of these villages. In the early years of its existence, residents of Segev were employed in building roads and forestry work. They planted the Segev forest, which today covers both sides of Highway 805, from Yavor junction to the Misgav services center.

== See also ==
- List of forests in Israel
