= Ya'ad, Israel =

Ya'ad: יַעַד (Hebrew)
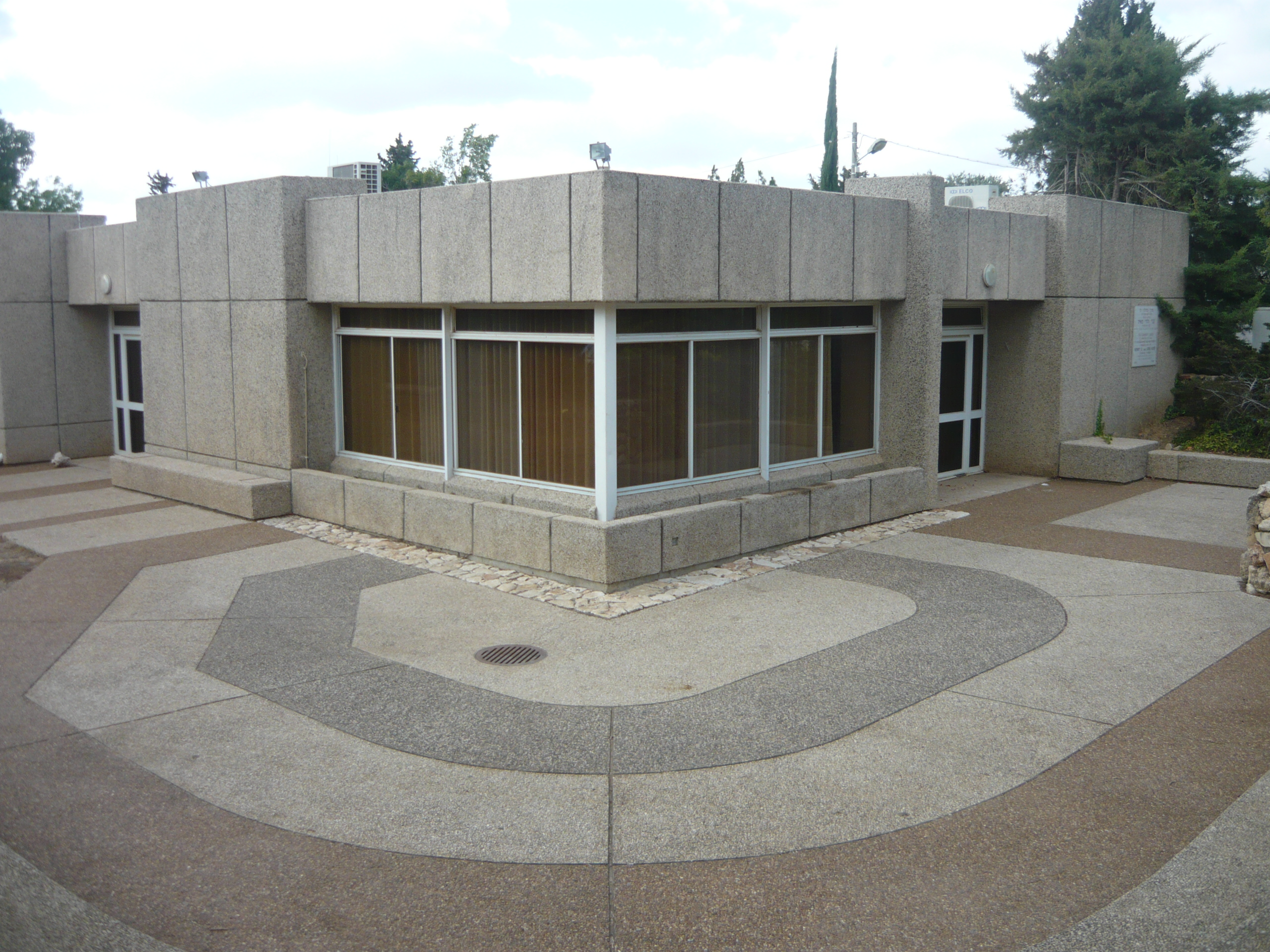
- Etymology: Destiny/Goal
- Location within Northwest Israel
- Coordinates: 32°52′44″N 35°14′33″E
- Country: Israel
- District: Northern
- Subdistrict: Acre
- Council: Misgav
- Affiliation: Moshavim Movement
- Founded: 1974
- Founder: Technion graduates
- Population (2024): 794
- Website: yaad.org.il

Ya'ad (Hebrew: יַעַד, lit. Destiny or Goal) is a small moshav in northern Israel. Located near the city of Karmiel, it falls under the jurisdiction of Misgav Regional Council. In 2024 it had a population of 794.

== History ==
It was founded in 1974 by computer science graduates from the Technion, on a hill southwest of Karmiel.

According to Walid Khalidi, Ya'ad was established in 1975 on land near the Palestinian village of Mi'ar, which had been depopulated in the 1948 Arab-Israeli War. Ya'ad was established north-east of the village site.
