= Dmeide =

Dmeide: דמיידה (Hebrew); ضميده (Arabic)
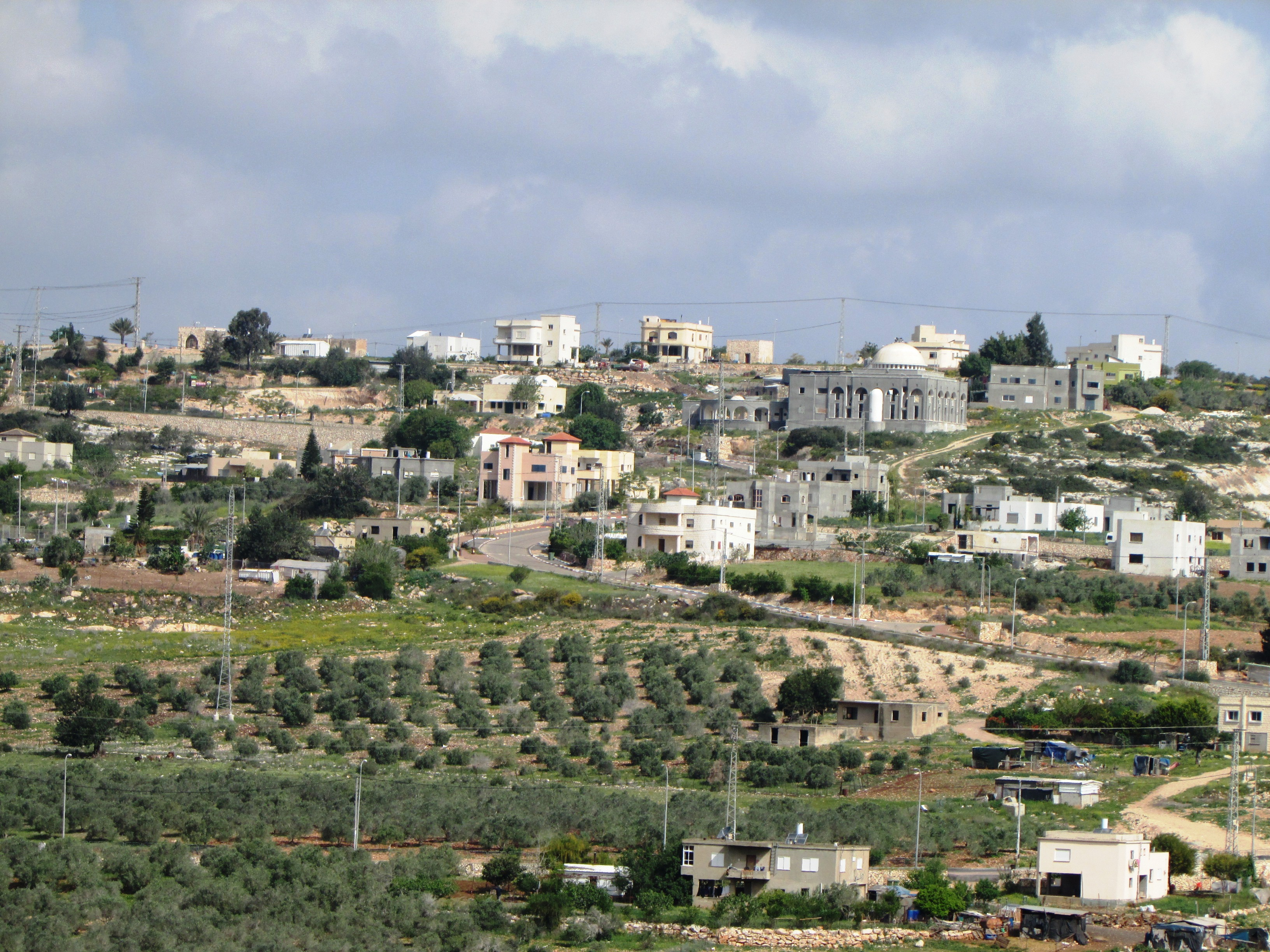

- Location within Northwest Israel Location within Israel
- Coordinates: 32°48′51″N 35°13′42″E
- Country: Israel
- District: Northern
- Subdistrict: Acre
- Council: Misgav
- Founded: 17th century
- Population (2024): 624

Dmeide (Hebrew: דמיידה, Arabic: ضميده) is a Bedouin village in northern Israel. Located in the Galilee near Kafr Manda, it falls under the jurisdiction of Misgav Regional Council. In 2024 its population was 624.

The village was established during the 17th century. It was recognised by Israel in 1995.

== See also ==
- Arab localities in Israel
- Bedouin in Israel
