= Kafr Manda =

Kafr Manda: כַּפְר מַנְדָא; كفر مندا
- Local council (from 1973)

Hebrew transcription(s)
  - ISO 259: Kpar Mandaˀ
  - Also spelled: Kafar Manda (official); Kfar Manda, Kufur Manda (unofficial)
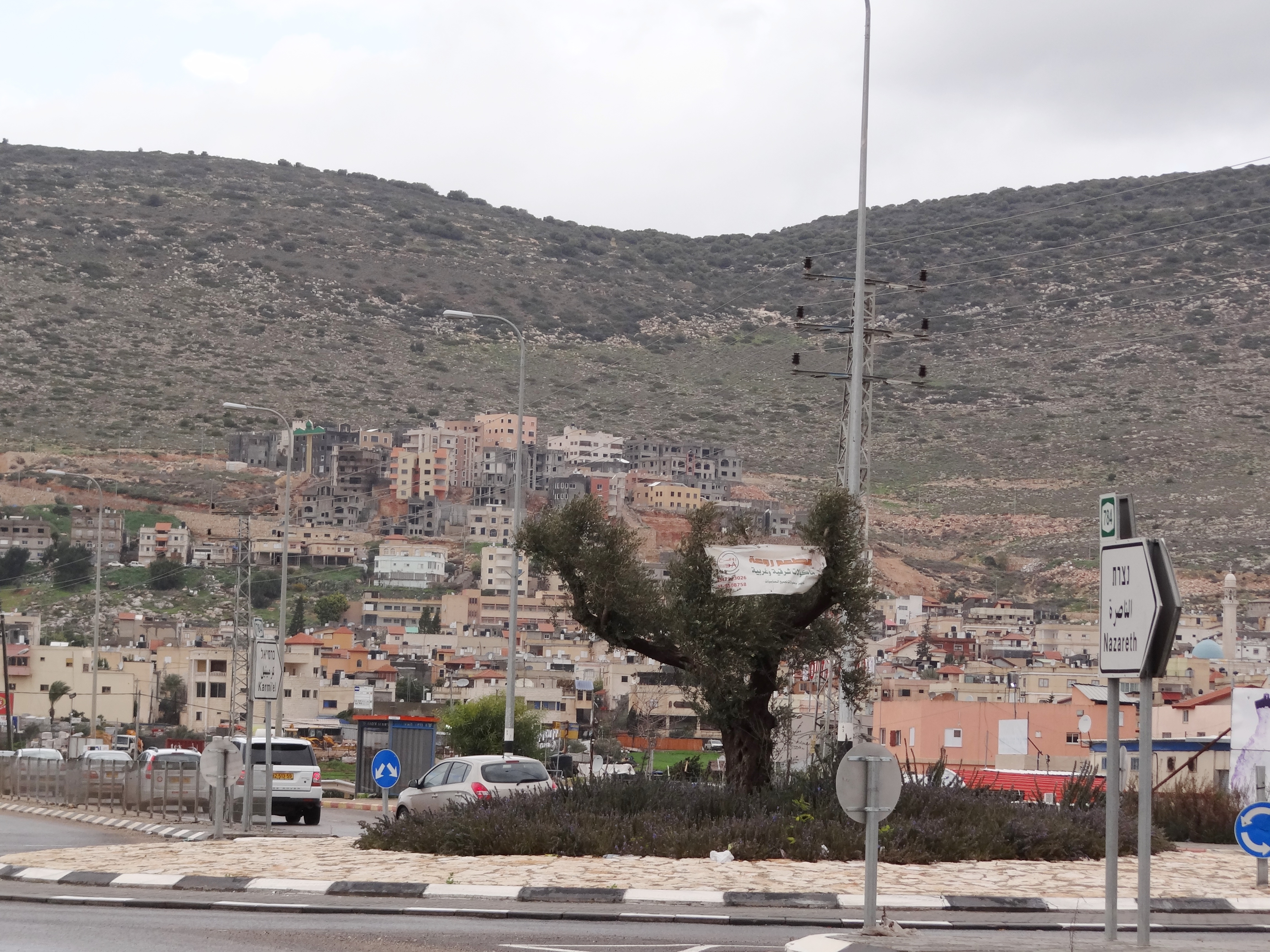

- Location within Northwest Israel Location within Israel
- Coordinates: 32°49′N 35°16′E
- Grid position: 174/246 PAL
- Country: Israel
- District: Northern
- Subdistrict: Acre
- Natural Region: Shefar'am

Area
  - Total: 11,052 dunams (11.052 km^{2}; 4.267 sq mi)

Population (2024)
  - Total: 22,268
  - Density: 2,014.8/km^{2} (5,218.4/sq mi)
- Name meaning: The village of Menda

Kafr Manda or Kfar Menda (Arabic: كفر مندا, Hebrew: כַּפְר מַנְדָא) is an Arab town in the Lower Galilee, on the slopes of Mount Atzmon in Israel's Northern District. Kafr Manda is 16 kilometres (9.9 mi) northwest of the city of Nazareth. In 2024 its population was 22,268. The inhabitants are predominantly Arab Muslims.

== History ==
=== Classical antiquity ===
Kafr Manda is located on an ancient site on a low hill. Ancient relics have been found, including architectural fragments, two fragmentary columns and capitals. Some remains from the Roman and Byzantine era have been found.

Kafr Manda is identified with Kfar Mandi, a Jewish village mentioned in the Talmudic and the Midrash literature. The Talmud mentions an amora under the name of Issachar of Kfar Mandi who studied Torah in Sepphoris.

=== Middle Ages ===
According to the 13th century Muslim scholar Yaqut al-Hamawi, Kafr Manda was:

"A village lying between Tabariyyah and 'Akkah. It is said to be called by the name Madyan (Midian). The tomb of the wife of Moses is seen here. Also, the pit covered by the rock which Moses raised up in order give himself and his wife water to drink. The rock is still shown. At Kafar Mandah may also be seen the tombs of two of Jacob's sons Ashir (Asher) and Nafshali (Naphthali), as is reported."

In 1962, “hundreds of clay jars, some of which were intact” dating to the 14th–15th centuries were found. Other remains from the Mamluk era have also been excavated.

Medieval rabbinic traditions identified Kfar Mandi as the burial site of three Jewish Mishnaic sages: Gamliel II, Issachar of Kfar Mandi and Rabbi Akiba ben Mahalalel.

=== Ottoman Empire ===
Incorporated into the Ottoman Empire in 1517 with all of Palestine, Kafr Manda appeared in the 1548–1549 or 1596 tax registers as being in the nahiya (subdistrict) of Tiberias under the Safed Sanjak. It had an entirely Muslim population consisting of 93 households and 11 bachelors. Taxes were paid on wheat, barley, olive trees, cotton, sorghum, goats and/or beehives, and a press for olives or grapes, a total of 13,028 akçe. In 1572, the men of Kafr Manda, Saffuriya, Ruma, and Rumana allied with local Bedouins and raided the waqf lands of Hittin and its shrine of Nabi Shu'ayb, taking hundreds of cattle and donkeys and damaging the village.

In the early 18th century, Kafr Manda was walled, and defended by several small forts. A map from Napoleon's invasion of 1799 by Pierre Jacotin showed the place, named as K. Mendah.

In 1838, Edward Robinson noted Kefr Menda as a Muslim village in the Nazareth district, while in 1852, he noted: "Kefr Menda is a considerable village at the foot of the northern hills [...] Among the people of the village are some of the descendants of Dhaher el-'Omar. The great well of the village was said to be fourteen fathoms in depth, besides seven fathoms of water. Around it lay three ancient sarcophagi [used] as drinking-troughs; one of them sculptured on the side with rather elegant festoons. Two lids of sarcophagi were also built into or upon the wall of the reservoir above; and near by was a small ancient basin of variegated limestone." The same year, (1852), the population was given as 200 souls, and the tillage twenty feddans.

In 1875, Victor Guérin found the village to have about 400 inhabitants, all Muslim.

In 1881, the Palestine Exploration Fund's Survey of Western Palestine described Kefr Menda as an "adobe village at the foot of Jebel ed Deibebeh, having a white muqam in it," while a population list from about 1887 showed that Kefr Menda had about 250 Muslim inhabitants.

=== British Mandate ===
In the 1922 census of Palestine, conducted by the British Mandate authorities, Kufr Manda had a total population of 428, all Muslim. In the 1931 census the population of Kafr Manda, together with Arab el Hujeirat, was a total of 975, all Muslim, in 187 inhabited houses.

In the 1945 statistics the population of Kafr Manda was 1,260 Muslims, who owned 14,935 dunams of land according to an official land and population survey. 795 dunams were plantations and irrigable land, 7,960 for cereals, while 47 dunams were built-up (urban) land.

=== Israel ===
On the crossroads between Acre and Nazareth, Kafr Manda surrendered to the advancing Israeli army during Operation Hiram, 29–31 October 1948. Many of the villagers fled north but some stayed and were not expelled by the Israeli soldiers. The town remained under Martial Law until 1966. It achieved local council status in 1973. Since then, roads have been paved, schools have been built and infrastructures such as sewage, electricity and irrigation systems have been introduced. In 1979, a bomb attack killed four people and injured eleven.

== Demographics ==
Historical population
| Year | Pop. | ±% |
|---|---|---|
| 1972 | 4,000 | — |
| 1983 | 6,300 | +57.5% |
| 1995 | 10,700 | +69.8% |
| 2008 | 15,700 | +46.7% |
| 2022 | 21,041 | +34.0% |
| 2024 | 22,267 | +5.8% |

== Voting Patterns ==
In the 2022 election, 94 percent of voters in Kafr Manda voted for the Arab parties, while 3 percent voted for the parties of the right-wing coalition led by Benjamin Netanyahu and 2 percent voted for the parties of the center-left coalition led by Yair Lapid. Among the voters for the Arab parties, 37 percent voted for Balad, while 31 percent voted for the Hadash–Ta'al list and 31 percent voted for Ra'am.

In the 2026 election, 97 percent of voters in Kafr Manda voted for the Arab parties, while 2 percent voted for the parties of the center-left coalition led by Gadi Eisenkot and 0.2 percent voted for the parties of the right-wing coalition led by Benjamin Netanyahu. Among the voters for the Arab parties, 57 percent voted for the Joint List, while 43 percent voted for Ra'am. Voter turnout increased 47 percent from the 2022 election.

== See also ==
- Arab localities in Israel
- Sinai bus crash

== Bibliography ==
- Barron, J. B., ed. (1923). Palestine: Report and General Abstracts of the Census of 1922. Government of Palestine.
- Conder, C.R.; Kitchener, H.H. (1881). The Survey of Western Palestine: Memoirs of the Topography, Orography, Hydrography, and Archaeology. Vol. 1. London: Committee of the Palestine Exploration Fund.
- Feig, Nurit (2022-09-13). "Kafr Manda". Hadashot Arkheologiyot – Excavations and Surveys in Israel (134).
- Egmont, van [in German]; Heyman, John (1759). Travels through part of Europe, Asia Minor, the islands of the archipelago, Syria, Palestine, Egypt, Mount Sinai, &c. giving a particular account of the most remarkable places. Vol. 2. London: L. Davis and C. Reymers.
- Dauphin, C. (1998). La Palestine byzantine, Peuplement et Populations. BAR International Series 726 (in French). Vol. III : Catalogue. Oxford: Archeopress. ISBN 0-860549-05-4.
- Department of Statistics (1945). Village Statistics, April, 1945. Government of Palestine.
- Guérin, V. (1880). Description Géographique Historique et Archéologique de la Palestine (in French). Vol. 3: Galilee, pt. 1. Paris: L'Imprimerie Nationale.
- Gur, Yuval (2016-12-29). "Kafr Manda". Hadashot Arkheologiyot – Excavations and Surveys in Israel (128).
- Hadawi, S. (1970). Village Statistics of 1945: A Classification of Land and Area ownership in Palestine. Palestine Liberation Organization Research Center.
- Heyd, Uriel (1960). Ottoman Documents on Palestine, 1552–1615. Oxford: Oxford University Press.
- Hütteroth, W.-D.; Abdulfattah, K. (1977). Historical Geography of Palestine, Transjordan and Southern Syria in the Late 16th Century. Erlanger Geographische Arbeiten, Sonderband 5. Erlangen, Germany: Vorstand der Fränkischen Geographischen Gesellschaft. ISBN 3-920405-41-2.
- Karmon, Y. (1960). "An Analysis of Jacotin's Map of Palestine" (PDF). Israel Exploration Journal. 10 (3, 4): 155–173, 244–253. Archived from the original (PDF) on 2019-12-22.
- Le Strange, G. (1890). Palestine Under the Moslems: A Description of Syria and the Holy Land from A.D. 650 to 1500. London: Committee of the Palestine Exploration Fund.
- Mills, E., ed. (1932). Census of Palestine 1931. Population of Villages, Towns and Administrative Areas. Jerusalem: Government of Palestine.
- Palmer, E.H. (1881). The Survey of Western Palestine: Arabic and English Name Lists Collected During the Survey by Lieutenants Conder and Kitchener, R. E. Transliterated and Explained by E.H. Palmer. Committee of the Palestine Exploration Fund.
- Robinson, E.; Smith, E. (1841). Biblical Researches in Palestine, Mount Sinai and Arabia Petraea: A Journal of Travels in the year 1838. Vol. 3. Boston: Crocker & Brewster.
- Robinson, E.; Smith, E. (1856). Later Biblical Researches in Palestine and adjacent regions: A Journal of Travels in the year 1852. London: John Murray.
- Rhode, H. (1979). Administration and Population of the Sancak of Safed in the Sixteenth Century. Columbia University. Archived from the original on 2020-03-01.
- Schumacher, G. (1888). "Population list of the Liwa of Akka". Quarterly Statement - Palestine Exploration Fund. 20: 169–191.
