= Yuvalim =

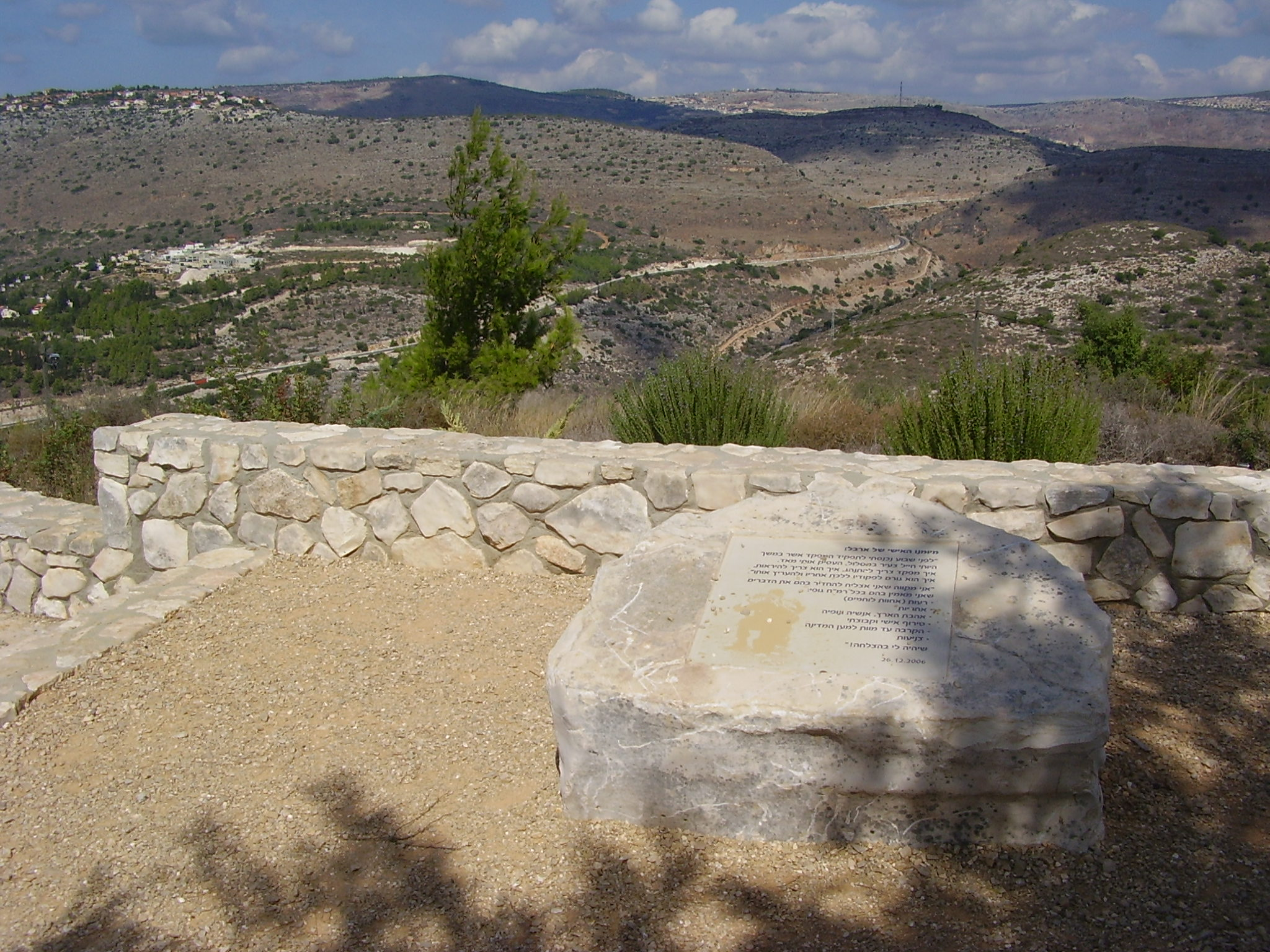
- View from Arbel Hill in Yuvalim

- Location within Northwest Israel
- Coordinates: 32°52′44″N 35°16′14″E
- Country: Israel
- District: Northern
- Subdistrict: Acre
- Council: Misgav
- Affiliation: Hitahdut HaIkarim
- Founded: 1982
- Founder: Rafael employees
- Population (2024): 1,179

Yuvalim (Hebrew: יוּבַלִּים) is a community settlement in northern Israel. Located in the Galilee, it falls under the jurisdiction of Misgav Regional Council. In 2024 it had a population of 1,179.

== History ==
The village was established by a core group of Rafael employees and their families in 1982 on land that traditionally belonged to Sakhnin.

== Notable people ==
- Navot Papushado (b. 1980 in Yuvalim), Israeli film director and screenwriter
