= Rakefet =

Community settlement in northern Israel

Rakefet: רַקֶּפֶת (Hebrew)
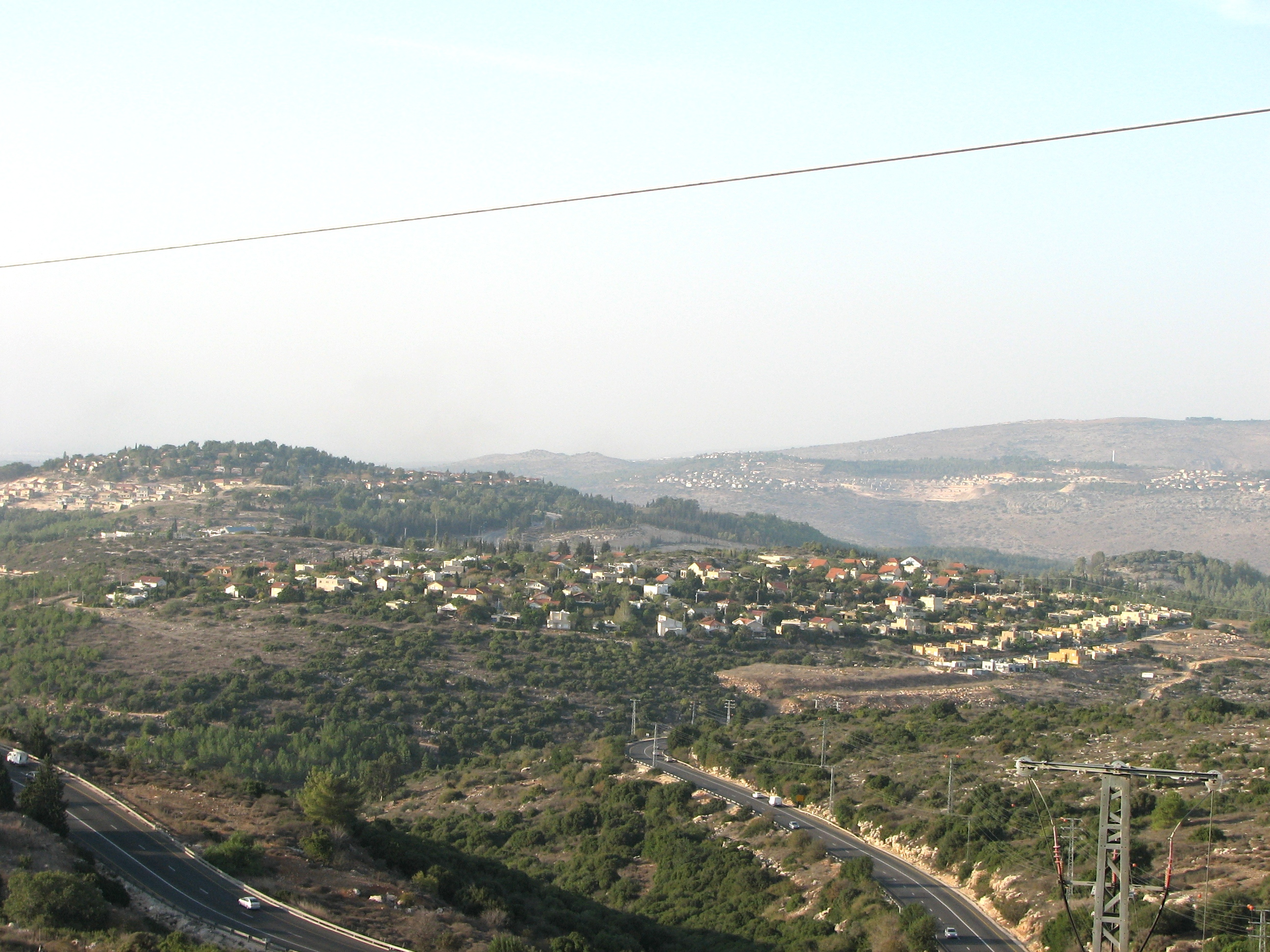
- Etymology: Cyclamen
- Location within Northwest Israel Location within Israel
- Coordinates: 32°51′17″N 35°15′56″E
- Country: Israel
- District: Northern
- Subdistrict: Acre
- Council: Misgav
- Affiliation: Moshavim Movement
- Founded: 1981
- Population (2024): 938

Rakefet (Hebrew: רַקֶּפֶת) is a community settlement in northern Israel. Located in the Lower Galilee near Sakhnin, it falls under the jurisdiction of Misgav Regional Council. In 2024 it had a population of 938.

== History ==
The village was established in 1981 as a moshav shitufi; its name means "Cyclamen". In August 1989 it was converted to a community settlement.

In September 2011 a High Court of Justice ordered the Israel Lands Administration to allocate a plot of state land to an Arab couple, Fatina and Ahmed Zabeidat. The ruling came after the Arab couple was first denied a membership in the community.
