= Koranit =

Koranit: קוֹרָנִית (Hebrew)
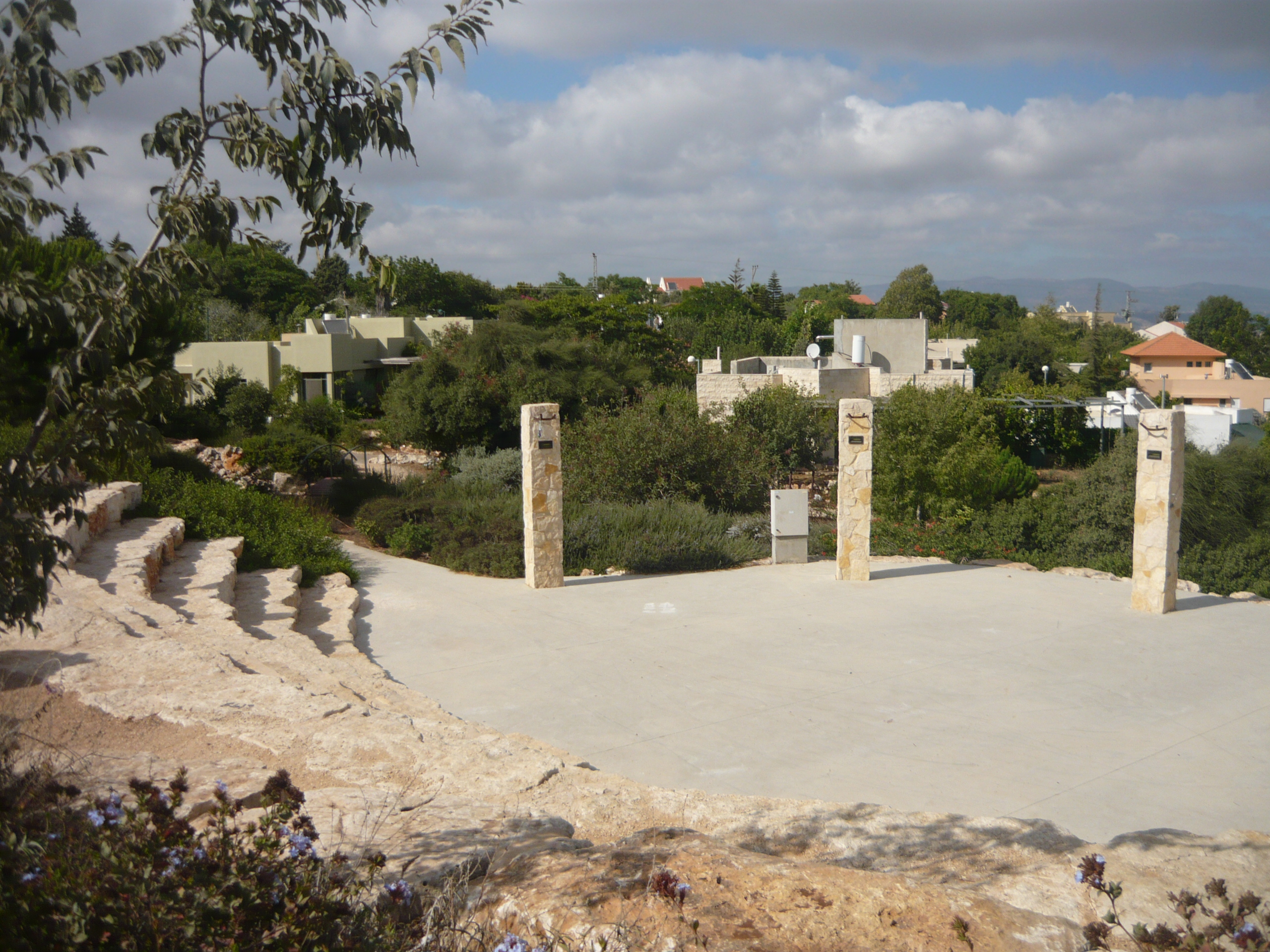

- Location within Northwest Israel Location within Israel
- Coordinates: 32°50′39″N 35°15′8″E
- Country: Israel
- District: Northern
- Subdistrict: Acre
- Council: Misgav
- Affiliation: Agricultural Union
- Founded: 1978
- Population (2024): 906

Koranit (Hebrew: קוֹרָנִית, lit. Thyme) is a community settlement in northern Israel. Located in the Galilee on Mount Shekhanya, it falls under the jurisdiction of Misgav Regional Council. In 2024 it had a population of 906.

== History ==
The village was established in 1978 as a moshav shitufi, and was later converted to a community settlement.
