= Yodfat =

Yodfat: יוֹדְפַת (Hebrew)
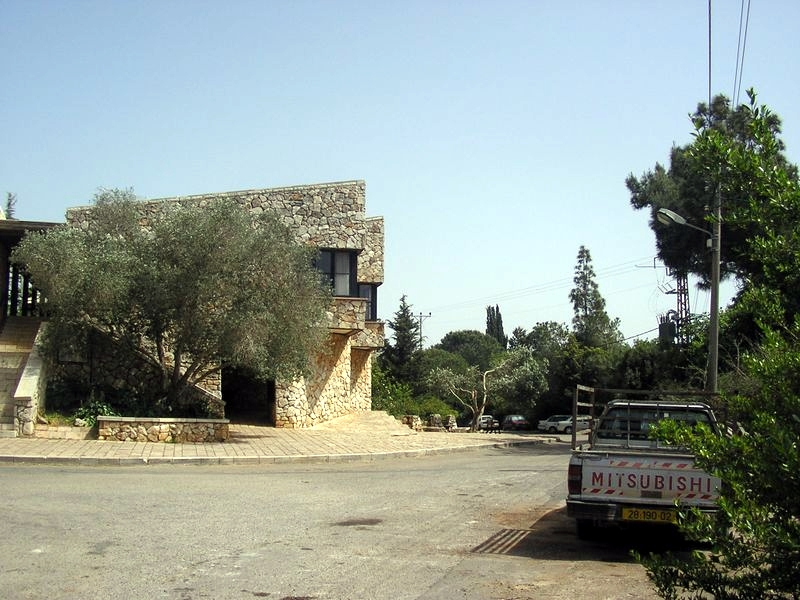

- Location within Northwest Israel Location within Israel
- Coordinates: 32°50′13″N 35°16′25″E
- Country: Israel
- District: Northern
- Subdistrict: Acre
- Council: Misgav
- Affiliation: Kibbutz Movement
- Founded: 1200 BCE (Israelite town); 10 CE (Second Judean town); 1960 (Israeli town)
- Founder: Hebrew Reali School graduates
- Population (2024): 976

Yodfat (Hebrew: יוֹדְפַת) is a moshav shitufi in northern Israel. Located in the Lower Galilee, south of Carmiel and in the vicinity of the Atzmon mountain ridge, north of the Beit Netofa Valley, it falls under the jurisdiction of Misgav Regional Council. In 2024 it had a population of 976.

Modern Yodfat is named after the Second Temple period town of the same name and is situated to the north of the archaeological tell. Yodfat was established in 1960 by graduates of the Hebrew Reali School of Haifa.

== History ==
=== Antiquity ===
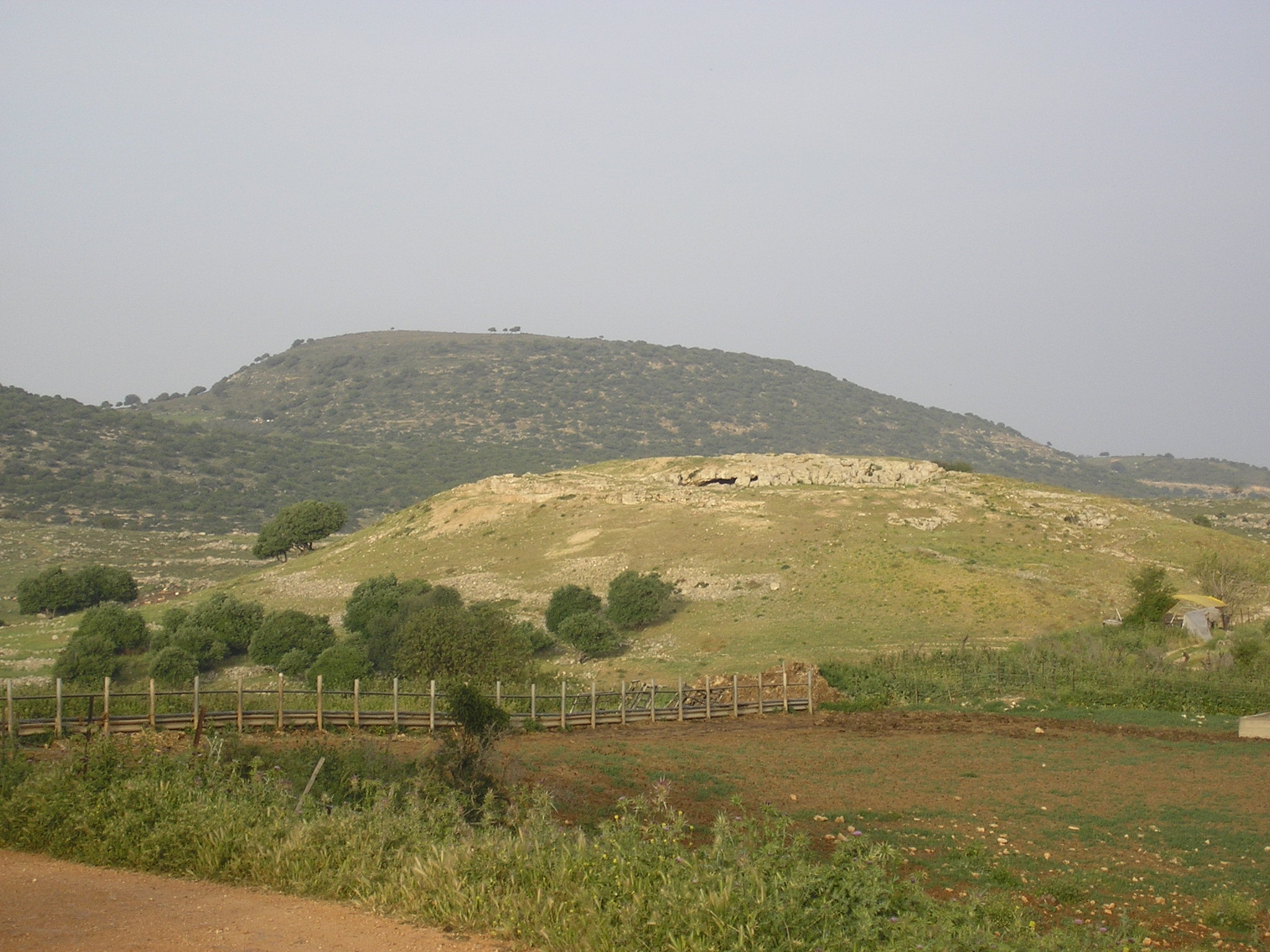
Site of ancient Yodfat.

Ancient Yodfat, Koine Greek: Ἰωτάπατα, which was situated to the southeast of the modern moshav, is mentioned in the Mishnah as a walled Israelite village dating from the time of Joshua corresponding with the Iron Age. "Jotapata may be the same as Jotbah which was the birthplace of Meshullemeth ... the mother of Amon, king of Judah (2 Kgs. 21:19)."

Archaeological explorations of the site, however, have thus far revealed a modest village established sometime during the Hellenistic period between the fourth and third centuries BCE. As the Hasmonean kings extended their influence into the Galilee during the last decades of the second century BCE, a change of population occurred at Yodfat and the village was populated by Jews. The earliest mention of the town is located in Josephus's The Jewish War.

=== First Jewish–Roman War ===
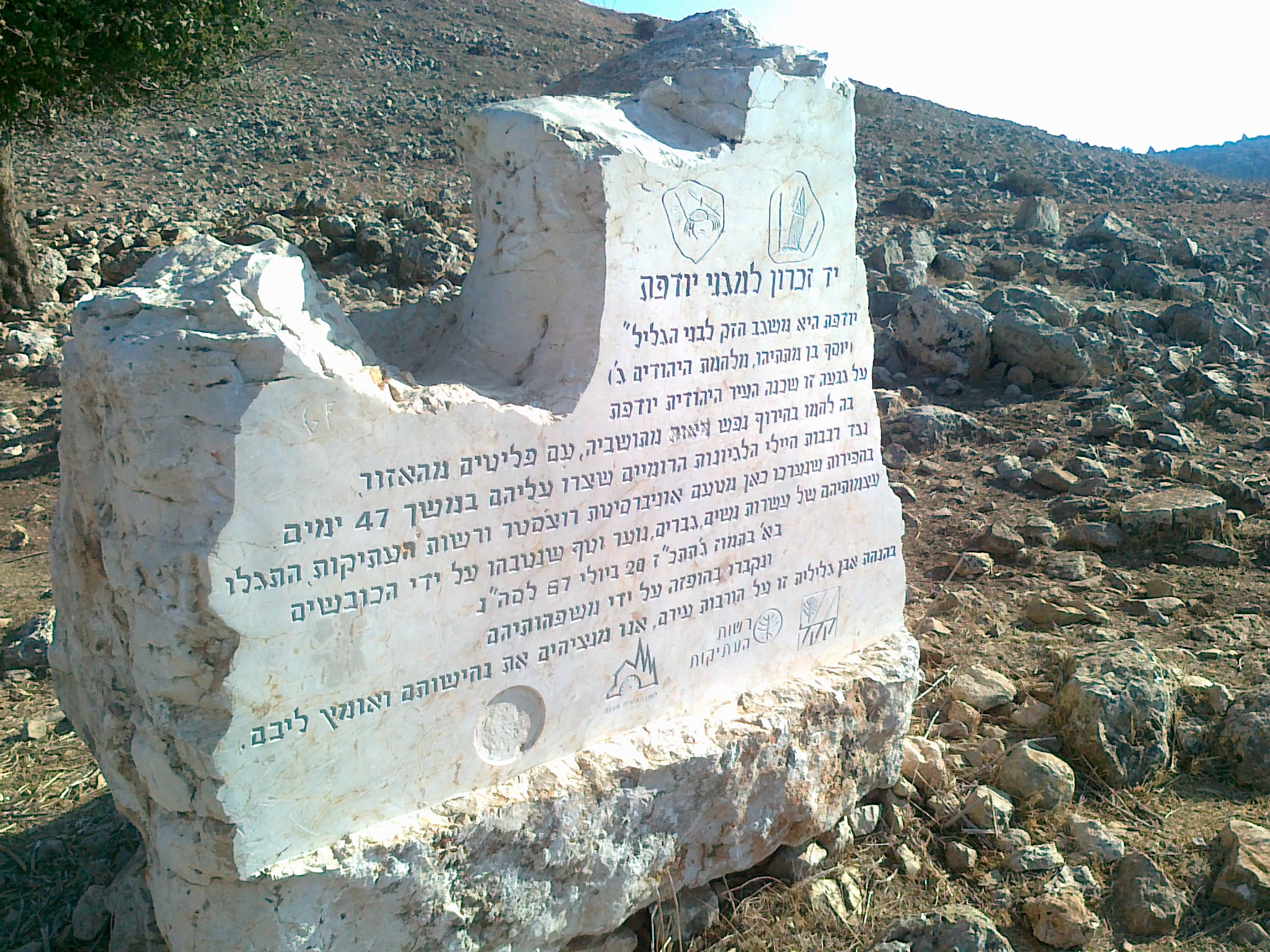
Memorial to the Jewish defenders of Yodfat, which fell to Roman forces on July 20, 67 CE

By the first century CE Yodfat had expanded to encompass an area of 50 dunams (13 acres). Its siege and subsequent destruction in 67 CE are described in Josephus' The Jewish War, his chronicle of the First Jewish–Roman War. Led by future emperor Vespasian, three Roman legions—Legio V Macedonica, X Fretensis, and XV Apollinaris—besieged Yodfat, meeting strong Jewish resistance. After 47 days the city fell by treachery, and Josephus describes the death of 40,000 Jews and the enslavement of 1200 women and children. Yodfat was razed and burnt on the first of the Hebrew month of Tammuz (July 20, 67). While a few dozen remaining fighters committed suicide, Josephus managed to survive this pact and was captured by the Romans.

After its capture by the Romans, Yodfat was re-established at a nearby site by refugees from Jerusalem, among them the priestly family of Miyamin (Hebrew: מִיָמִין, romanized: Miyāmin). Inscriptions describe it as the sixth miśmār or priestly division of the era. "[A]n inscription bearing the names of the miśmarōṯ (priestly wards), which was initially discovered in September 1970 by W. Müller and then, independently, by P. Grjaznevitch within a mosque in Bayt al-Ḥāḍir, a village situated near Tan‘im, east of Ṣanʻā’." This town is mentioned in the Talmud as the home of Rabbi Menachem (Hebrew: רבי מנחם יודפאה, romanized: ribbi Mənaḥēm Yoḏp̄āʾā, lit. 'Rabbi Mənaḥem the Yoḏp̄āite', Zevahim 110b:4). It flourished for another 300 years before being destroyed.

=== Modern era ===
Modern Yodfat was established in 1960 by graduates of the Hebrew Reali School of Haifa. It is currently an agricultural Jewish community, located about 1 km north-west of the ancient ruins.

The modern village was built by traditional Jews, seeking to preserve traditional values in parallel to agricultural work. At first, the village was an observation site of the JNF, while its inhabitants were mostly the JNF employees. Later, the village became an agricultural society, with most of its residents working the nearby lands. By the 1990s, the village turned into a larger communal center, with a larger variety of professions for its residents. Today it includes 200 families. During the 2025 Twelve-Day War between Iran and Israel, an agricultural building in Yodfat was hit by shrapnel from a ballistic missile fired by Iran after the ceasefire began.

== Economy ==
In 1968, Yodfat established a flower bulb nursery which exports millions of bulbs throughout the world. The nursery employs forty people and has an R&D facility for developing new hybrids, including the Ornithogalum dubium and Cyclamen persicum. Yodfat's Jerusalem hybrid F1 anemones and Galilee hybrid F1 anemones are hand-pollinated and unique in the cut-flower trade.

A short walk from Yodfat there is the "Goats with the Wind farm", a family-run organic goat cheese farm and restaurant, founded in 1993 by former residents of Yodfat. The farm's walls and buildings were constructed over time out of stones collected from the surrounding area.

== Archaeology ==
Ancient Yodfat was first identified in 1847 by Ernst Gustav Schultz (1811–1851), Egyptologist and Prussian consul in Jerusalem, using the geographical and topographical descriptions provided by Josephus, as well as by the phonetic similarity to the adjacent ruin of Khirbet Shifat. Six excavation seasons were carried out at the site between 1992 and 2000, under the direction of Mordechai Aviam of Kinneret Academic College on behalf of the Israel Antiquities Authority and the University of Rochester. These have revealed remains of fortifications, cisterns and extensive evidence of the large scale battle which took place at Yodfat, including a mass grave containing human remains. The last season ended in November 2020. According to Aviam, the residents poured boiling oil on the Roman soldiers as they climbed the town wall on ladders.

A fragment from a storage jar bears a Jewish script inscription displaying the Hebrew letters אכ was also found at the site.

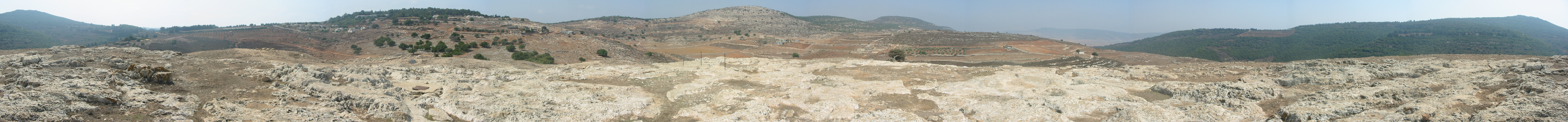
The view from Ancient Yodfat.

== See also ==
- Bersabe
- Jewish revolt against Gallus
- Tarichaea
