= Route 675 (Israel) =

Route in Israel

Route 675
- כביש 675
- Ta'anakhim Road

Route information
- Length: 13.40 km (8.33 mi)

Major junctions
- West end: HaSargel Junction
- East end: Navot Interchange

Location
- Country: Israel

Highway system
- Roads in Israel; Highways
| ← Route 672 | → Route 716 |

Route 675, (also known as the Ta'anakhim Road) is a regional road in the Jezreel Valley, Israel, that surrounds Afula from the south. From the road, there are branches to the settlements of the Ta'anakh region, hence its name.

== Junctions & Interchanges (West to East) ==
| District | Location | km | mi | Name | Destinations | Notes |
|---|---|---|---|---|---|---|
| Northern | Nir Yafe | 0 | 0.0 | צומת הסרגל (HaSargel Junction) | Highway 65 | |
| Northern | Nir Yafe; Merkaz Omen | 2.11 | 1.31 | צומת אומן (Omen Junction) | Road 6714 | |
| Northern | Dvora; Merkaz Hever | 3.46 | 2.15 | צומת חבר (Hever Junction) | Road 6724 | |
| Northern | Avital | 7.64 | 4.75 | צומת אביטל (Avital Junction) | Access road to Avital | |
| Northern | Merkaz Yael | 8.88 | 5.52 | צומת יזרעאל (Yizre'el Junction) | Road 6734 | |
| Northern | Yizre'el | 9.03 | 5.61 | צומת יזרעאל (Yizre'el Junction) | Highway 60 | |
| Northern | Yizre'el | 9.55 | 5.93 | צומת יזרעאל (Yizre'el Junction) | Access road to Yizre'el | |
| Northern | Tel Jezreel | 10.59 | 6.58 | צומת נורית (Nurit Junction) | Route 667 | |
| Northern | Kfar Yehezkel | 13.40 | 8.33 | מחלף נבות (Navot Interchange) | Highway 71 | |
1.000 mi = 1.609 km; 1.000 km = 0.621 mi

== See also ==
- List of highways in Israel
