= Merkaz Omen =

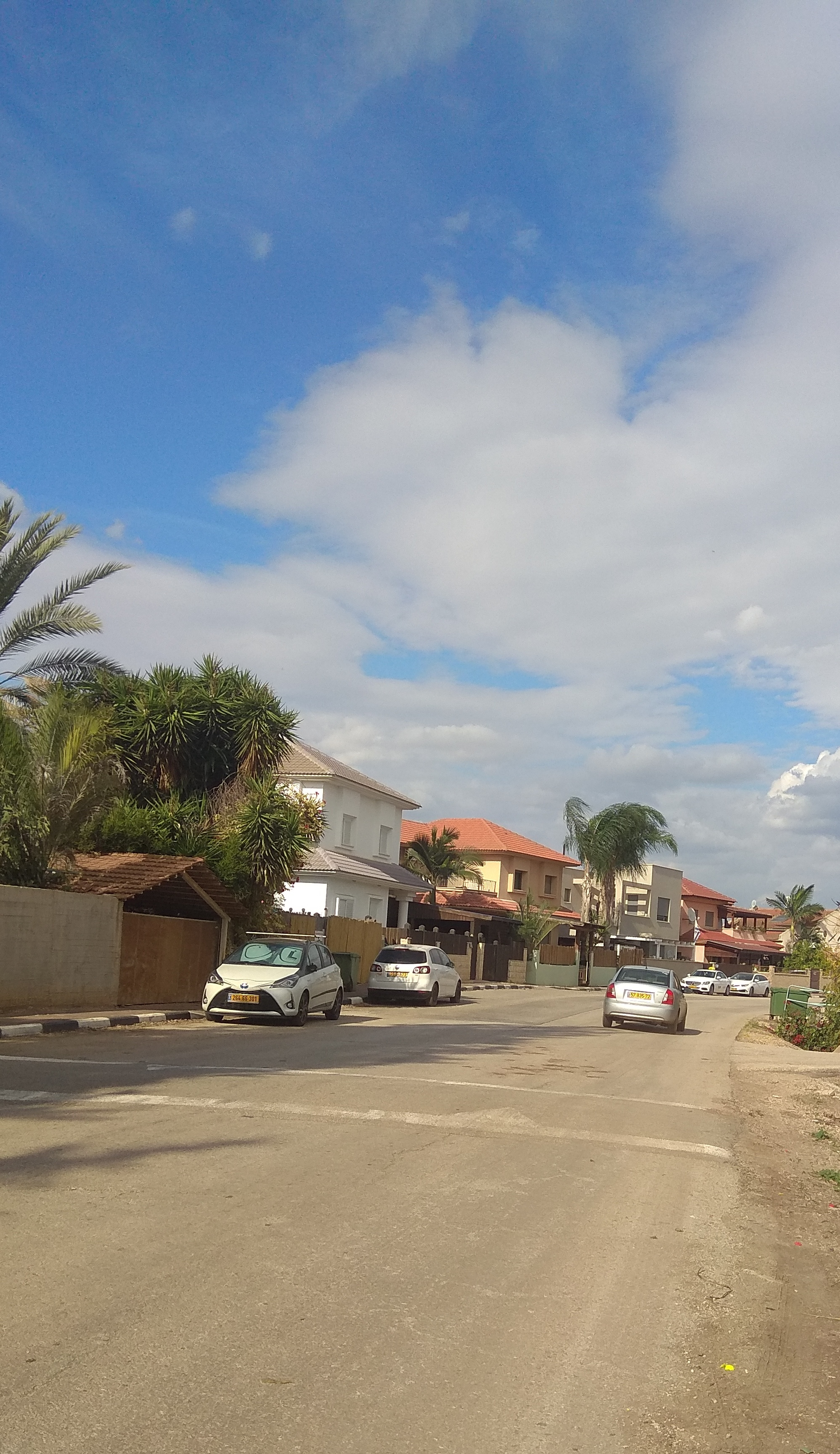

- Location within Jezreel Valley region of Israel
- Coordinates: 32°33′48″N 35°14′34″E
- Country: Israel
- District: Northern
- Subdistrict: Jezreel
- Council: Gilboa
- Founded: 1958
- Population (2024): 955

Merkaz Omen (Hebrew: מֶרְכָּז אֹמֶן), also Omen, is a community settlement in northern Israel.

== History ==
Mercaz Omen was founded in 1958 as a communal center for the nearby moshavim of Nir Yafeh, Meleah and Gadish. Located in the Ta'anakh region, it falls under the jurisdiction of Gilboa Regional Council. In 2024 it had a population of 955.
