= Kokhav Plateau Natural Region =

Coordinates: 32°36′42″N 35°25′36″E

- Natural Region
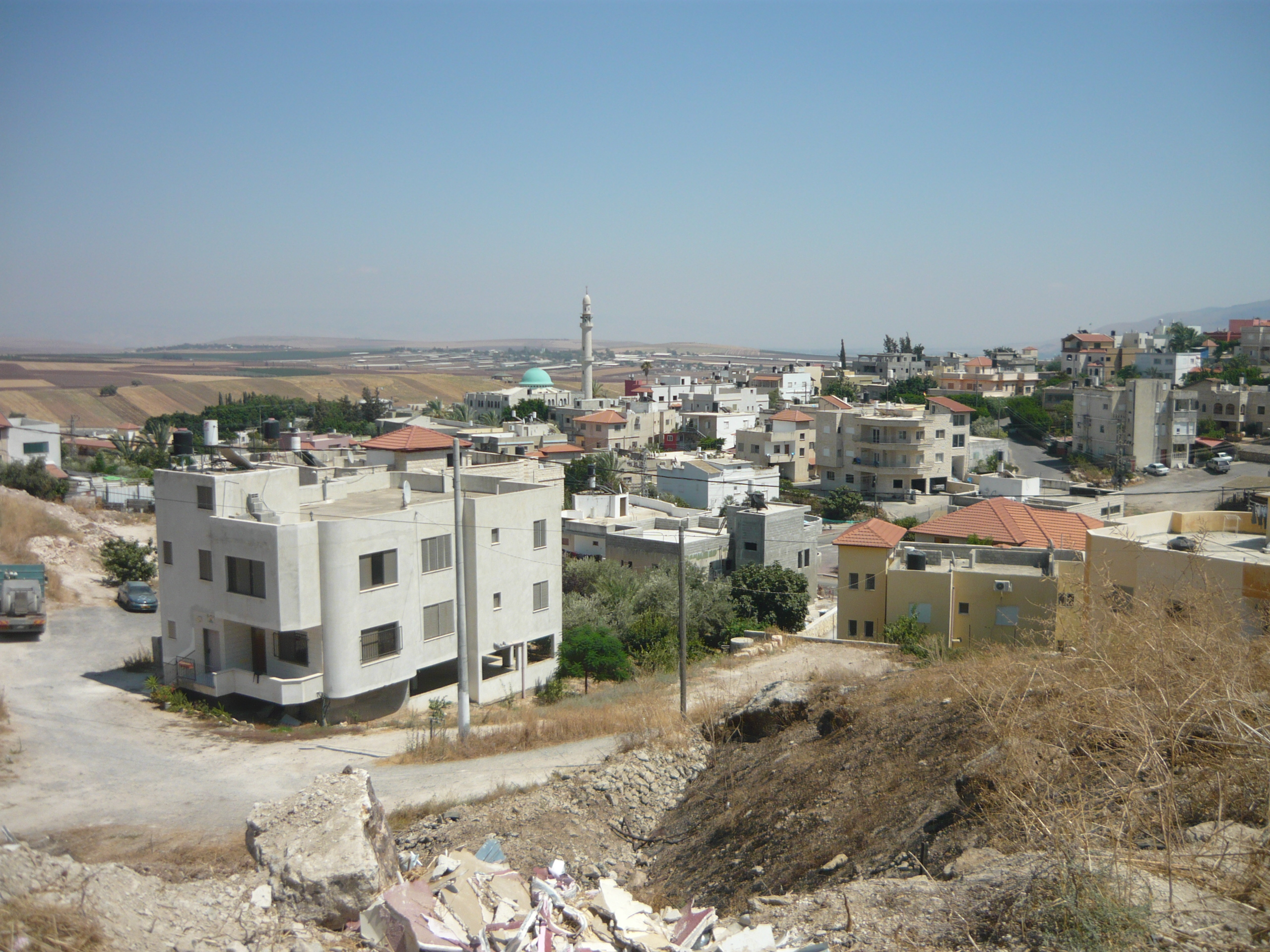
- Na'ura, one of the villages in the Kokhav Plateau Natural Region
- Interactive map of Kokhav Plateau Natural Region
- Country: Israel
- District: Northern
- Subdistrict: Jezreel
- Largest City: Kafr Misr

Area
  - Total: 154 km^{2} (59 sq mi)

Population (2024)
  - Total: 15,262

Ethnicity
  - Jews and others: 25.3%
  - Arabs: 73.5%

The Kokhav Plateau Natural Region is a natural region in the Jezreel Subdistrict, in the Northern District of Israel. Kafr Misr is the largest town in the natural region.

== Geography ==
Districts, Subdistricts and Natural Regions of the State of Israel, 2018

The natural region is located east of Afula and north of the Harod Valley. It is south of Mount Tabor, and drained mostly by Nahal Tavor and Harod Stream, both of which flow east into the Jordan River. It has an area of 154 km^{2}. It does not contain any major cities - the largest town in the natural region is the village of Kafr Misr, which contains just 18 percent of the natural region's population. It contains portions of three regional councils.

== Demographics ==
The majority of residents of the Kokhav Plateau Natural Region are Arab citizens of Israel, who constitute 74 percent of the population. 25 percent of the population consists of Jews. Of the nine towns in the natural region, five are Arab towns and four are Jewish towns.

Historical population
| Year | Pop. | ±% |
|---|---|---|
| 1972 | 3,900 | — |
| 1983 | 5,900 | +51.3% |
| 1995 | 7,700 | +30.5% |
| 2008 | 11,200 | +45.5% |
| 2022 | 14,711 | +31.3% |
| 2024 | 15,262 | +3.7% |

== Administrative local authorities ==
| Cities | Local Councils | Villages |
|---|---|---|
| [None] | [None] | Bustan al-Marj: Kafr Misr; Nein; Jezreel Valley: Ein Dor; Gazit; Gilboa: Moledet; Na'ura; Ramat Tzvi; Taibe; Tamra |

== Voting patterns ==
In the 2022 election, 50 percent of voters in the natural region voted for the Arab parties, while 43 percent voted for the parties of the center-left coalition led by Yair Lapid and 6 percent voted for the parties of the right-wing coalition led by Benjamin Netanyahu.

In the 2026 election, 61 percent of voters in the natural region voted for the Arab parties, while 33 percent voted for the parties of the center-left coalition led by Gadi Eisenkot and 4 percent voted for the parties of the right-wing coalition led by Benjamin Netanyahu. An additional 1.2 percent voted for the Reservists, and 0.5 percent voted for Amcha Yisrael. Voter turnout increased 51 percent from the 2022 election.
