= Harod Valley Natural Region =

Coordinates: 32°31′43″N 35°20′5″E

- Natural Region
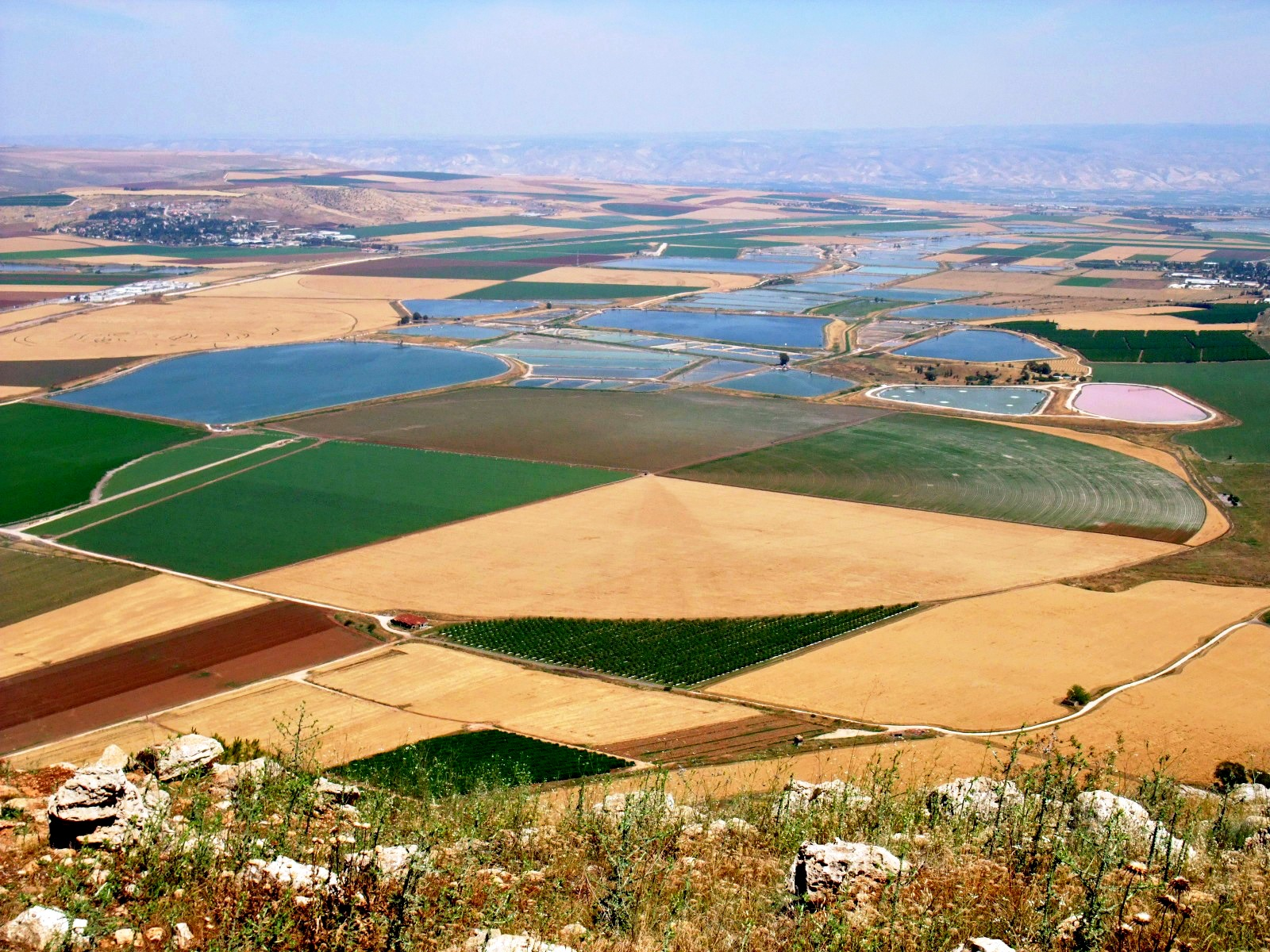
- Interactive map of Harod Valley Natural Region
- Country: Israel
- District: Northern
- Subdistrict: Jezreel
- Largest City: Gan Ner

Area
  - Total: 106 km^{2} (41 sq mi)

Population (2024)
  - Total: 12,631

Ethnicity
  - Jews and others: 83.0%
  - Arabs: 14.9%

The Harod Valley Natural Region is a natural region in the Jezreel Subdistrict, in the Northern District of Israel. Gan Ner is the largest town in the natural region.

== Geography ==
Districts, Subdistricts and Natural Regions of the State of Israel, 2018

The natural region is located in the Harod Valley, a transitional zone between the Jezreel Valley and the Beit She'an Valley. It is adjacent to the West Bank. It has an area of 106 km^{2}. It does not contain any major cities - the largest town in the natural region is the village of Gan Ner, which contains just 21 percent of the natural region's population. It is contained entirely within the Gilboa Regional Council.

== Demographics ==
Jews constitute a large majority of the population, at 83 percent. 15 percent of the population is Arab, concentrated in the town of Sandala.

Historical population
Year	Pop.	±%
1972	4,100	—
1983	5,100	+24.4%
1995	5,900	+15.7%
2008	9,700	+64.4%
2022	12,383	+27.7%
2024	12,631	+2.0%

== Administrative local authorities ==
Cities	Local Councils	Villages
[None]	[None]	Gilboa: Beit Alfa; Beit HaShita; Ein Harod (Ihud); Ein Harod (Meuhad); Gan Ner; Geva; Gidona; Heftziba; Kfar Yehezkel; Nurit; Sandala; Tel Yosef

== Voting Patterns ==
In the 2022 election, 66 percent of voters in the natural region voted for the center-left coalition led by Yair Lapid, while 23 percent voted for the parties of the parties of the right-wing coalition led by Benjamin Netanyahu and 8 percent voted for the Arab parties.

In the 2026 election, 61 percent of voters in the natural region voted for the parties of the center-left coalition led by Gadi Eisenkot, while 20 percent voted for the parties of the right-wing coalition led by Benjamin Netanyahu and 14 percent voted for the Arab parties. An additional 2.5 percent voted for the Reservists, and 1.5 percent voted for Amcha Yisrael. Voter turnout increased 21 percent from the 2022 election.
