= Merkaz Hever =

Merkaz Hever: Hebrew: מֶרְכַּז חֶבֶר (Hebrew)
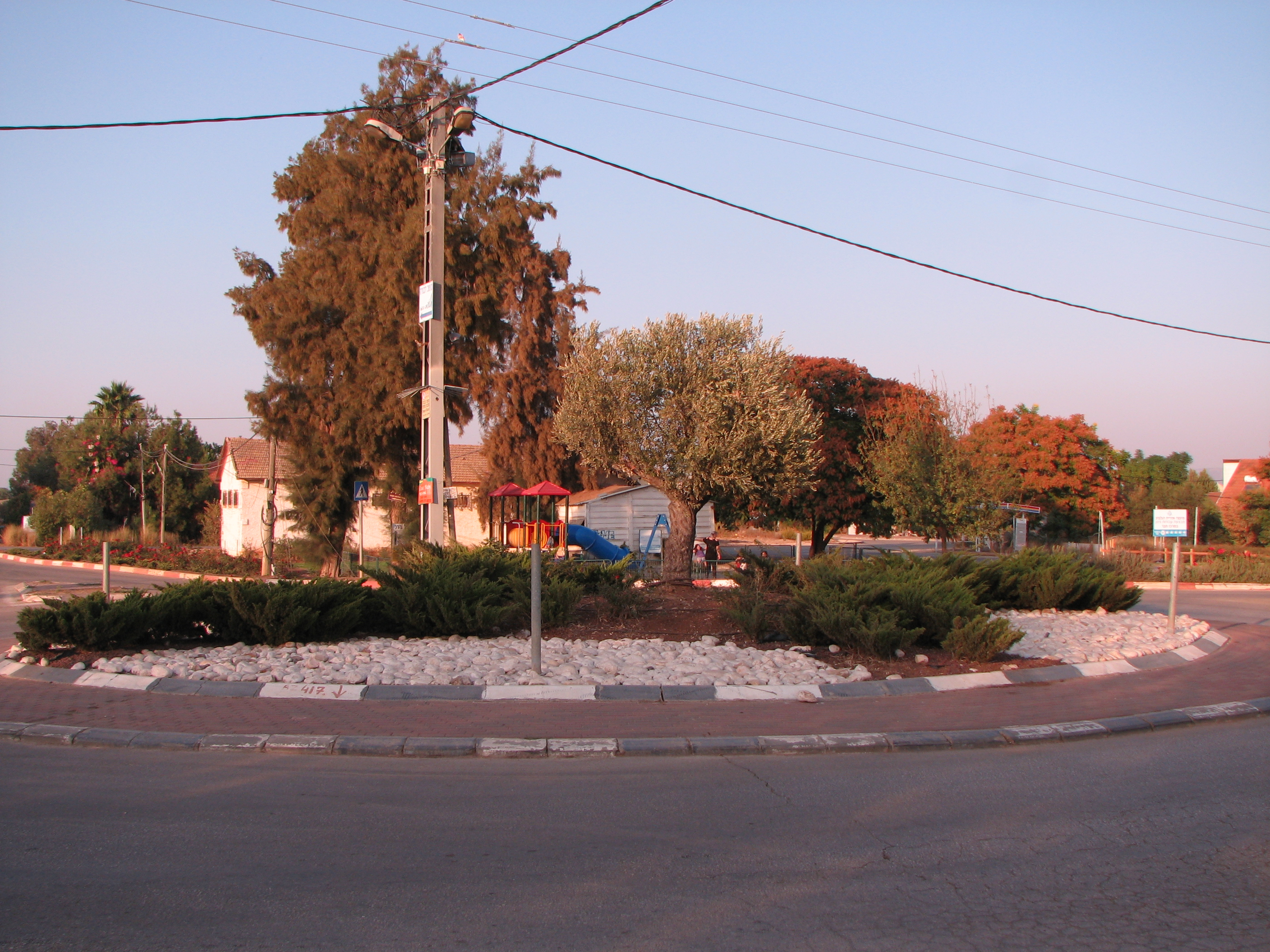

- Location within Jezreel Valley region of Israel
- Coordinates: 32°32′52″N 35°15′53″E
- Country: Israel
- District: Northern
- Subdistrict: Jezreel
- Council: Gilboa
- Founded: 1958
- Population (2024): 1,073

Merkaz Hever (Hebrew: מֶרְכַּז חֶבֶר) is a community settlement in northern Israel. Located in the Ta'anakh region, it falls under the jurisdiction of Gilboa Regional Council. In 2024 it had a population of 1,073.

== History ==
The community was founded in 1958 as a regional center for the three neighboring communities: Barak, Adirim, and Devorah. In 1982 it was expanded and converted to a communal settlement.

The name Merkaz Hever is connected to Yael, the wife of Hever the Kenite (Judges 4:17), after whom another communal settlement nearby is named (Merkaz Yael). All these five communities, mentioned above, including neighbouring Prazon got names from the same biblical story of Devorah's battle (Judges, chap 4–5), which took place in this area.
