= Magen Shaul =

Agricultural community in northern Israel

Magen Shaul: מָגֵן שָׁאוּל (Hebrew)
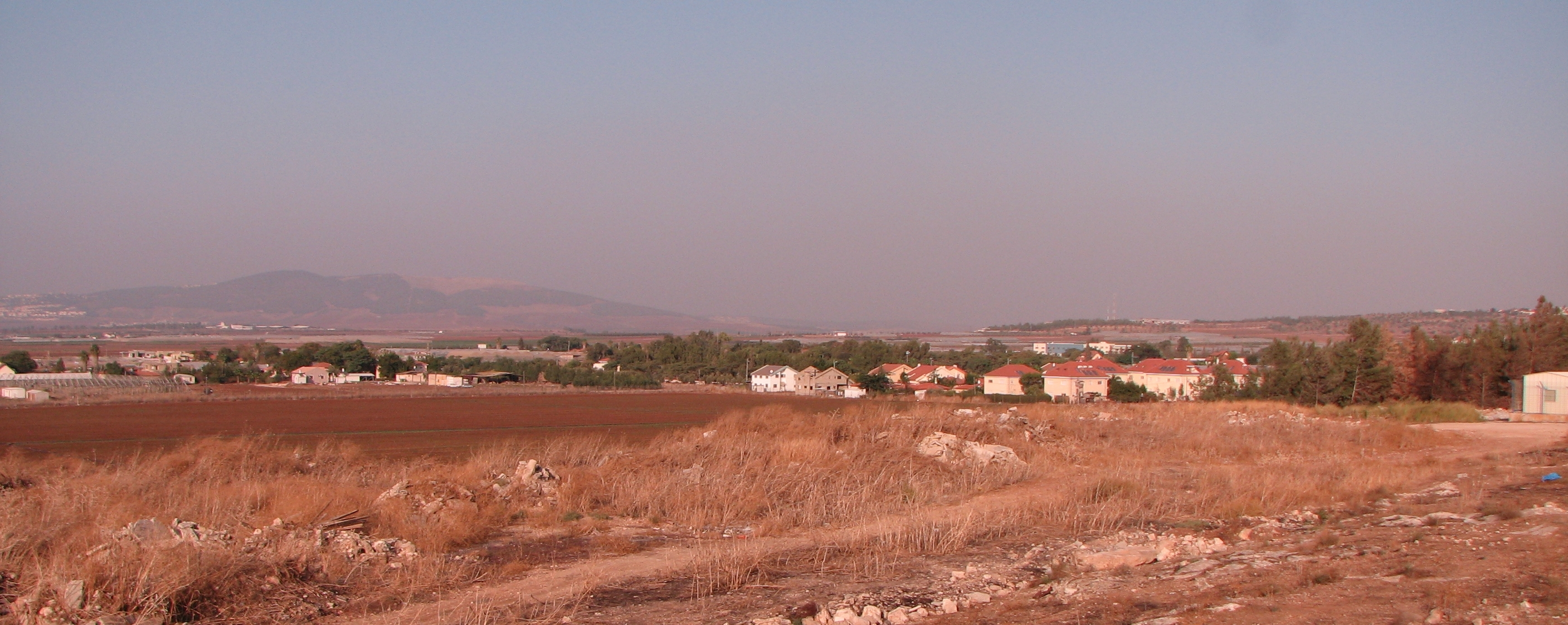

- Location within Jezreel Valley region of Israel
- Coordinates: 32°31′17″N 35°18′25″E
- Country: Israel
- District: Northern
- Subdistrict: Jezreel
- Council: Gilboa
- Affiliation: Kibbutz Movement
- Founded: 1953
- Founder: Nahal
- Population (2024): 916

Magen Shaul (Hebrew: מָגֵן שָׁאוּל) is a moshav in northern Israel. Located near Mount Gilboa, it falls under the jurisdiction of Gilboa Regional Council. In 2024 it had a population of 916.

== History ==
Magen Shaul was founded in 1976 by children of families who lived in other moshavim of the Ta'anakh region. The name "Magen Shaul" is borrowed from the elegy that David proclaimed after Saul died in a battle against the Philistines in the surrounding area. The economy was initially based on roses grown in hothouses.

In the early 2000s, ten Christian Zionist families from Canada immigrated to Israel and settled in Magen Shaul. They established Gilboa Tooling Industries, a manufacturing company that exports its products to the aerospace and medical industries around the world. They also established a vocational school to train metalworking trades in order to support the manufacturing sector of the Israeli industry.
