= Merkaz Yael =

Merkaz Yael: מרכז יעל (Hebrew)
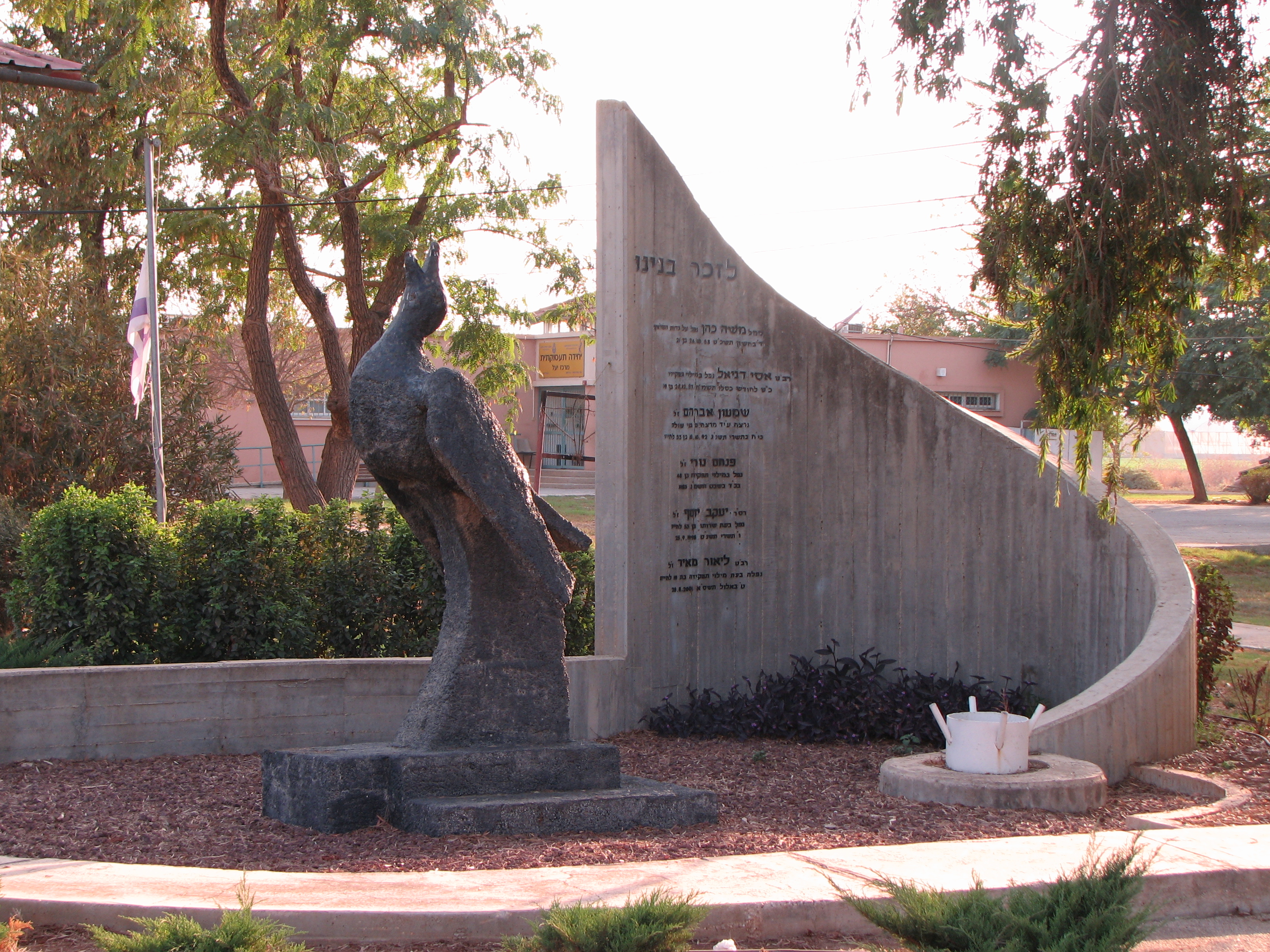

- Location within Jezreel Valley region of Israel
- Coordinates: 32°33′07″N 35°18′29″E
- Country: Israel
- District: Northern
- Subdistrict: Jezreel
- Council: Gilboa
- Founded: 1960

Merkaz Yael (Hebrew: מרכז יעל) is a community settlement in the Ta'anakh region in northern Israel. It belongs to the Gilboa Regional Council. In 2024 it had a population of .

== History ==
The village was founded in 1960 as part of the program to inhabit the Ta'anakh region. It formed a regional center for the nearby communities Prazon, Avital, and Meitav.

The name "Merkaz Yael" was inspired by Yael (Judges 4:17), the hero of the battle against Sisera in the Book of Judges and wife of Hever the Kenite, after whom another community settlement nearby is named (Merkaz Hever). This battle took place in the nearby region.
