= Oved Nur =

Israeli politician (born 1971)

- עובד נור
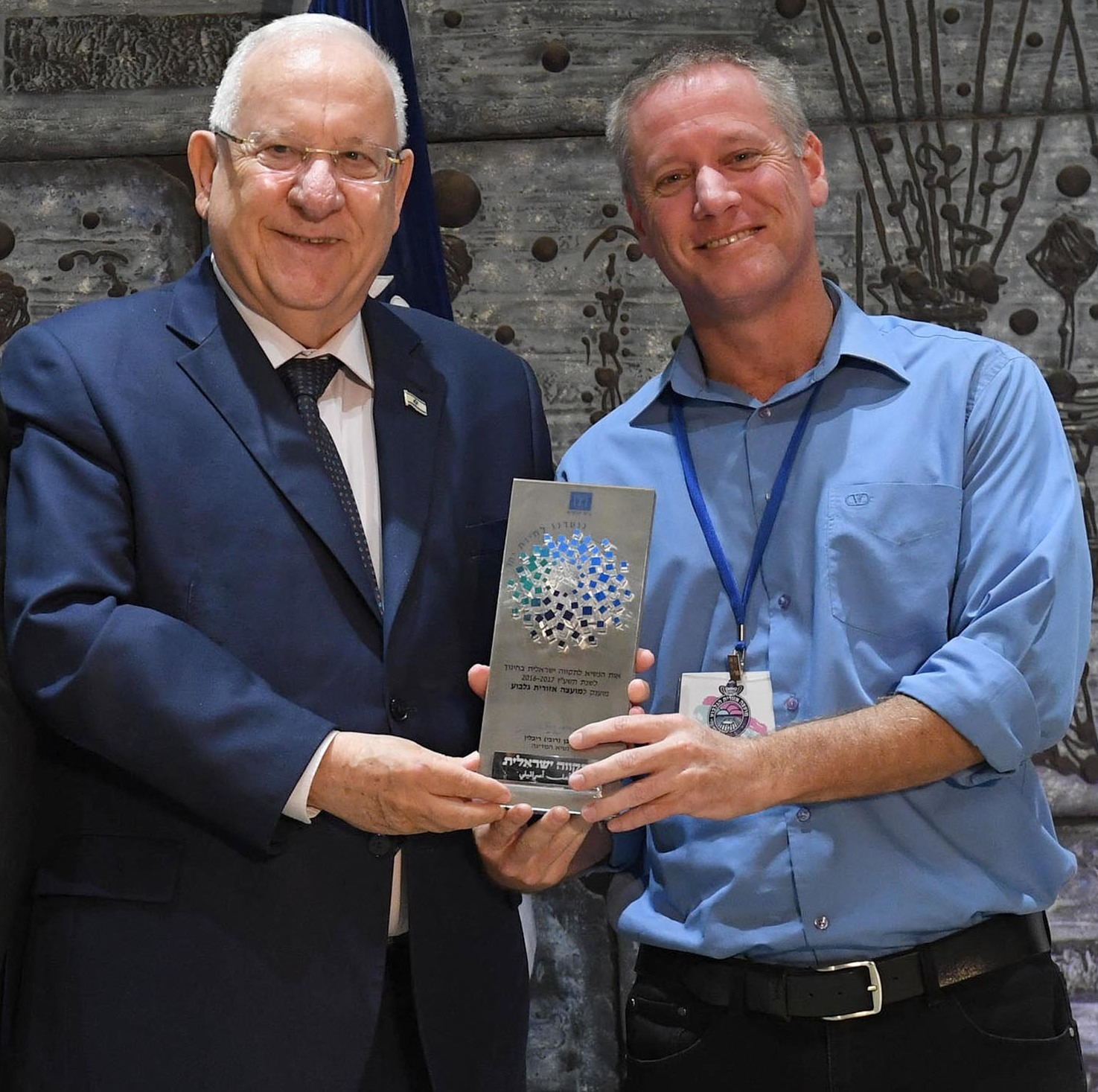
- Nur (right) receiving the President's Award for Education from Reuven Rivlin, November 2017

Head of the Gilboa Regional Council
- In office June 2015 – March 2024
- Preceded by: Danny Atar
- Succeeded by: Danny Atar

Personal details
- Born: 26 May 1971 (age 55) Ein Harod (Ihud), Israel
- Spouse: Dorit Nur
- Children: 3
- Education: Beit Berl College

Military service
- Allegiance: Israel
- Branch/service: Israel Defense Forces
- Rank: Major (reserves)

Oved Nur (Hebrew: עובד נור; born 26 May 1971) is an Israeli politician who served as head of the Gilboa Regional Council from 2015 to 2024.

== Early life and education ==
Nur was born in kibbutz Ein Harod (Ihud). He holds a bachelor's degree in education and Land of Israel studies. He served in the Israel Defense Forces as an officer in a special unit, and holds the rank of major in the reserves.

== Early career ==
Nur served two terms as chairman of the student union at Beit Berl College, where he was among the leaders of a campaign to reduce tuition fees. He later managed the Har HaNegev field school of the Society for the Protection of Nature in Israel in Mitzpe Ramon, and managed and developed the marketing operation of Egged Tours.

Before entering regional politics, Nur was the manager of the community settlement of Timrat, where he was responsible for the settlement's expansion, construction and infrastructure projects, its education system, community life and finances, and its relations with government and municipal bodies. He also served, in a voluntary capacity, as chairman of the local committee and of the cooperative association of Gan Ner, where he led a financial recovery plan and initiated youth and informal education activities.

According to a December 2013 report by the State Comptroller of Israel on the financing of that year's municipal election campaigns, Nur, who ran against incumbent Danny Atar in the November 2013 election, ended his campaign with a large surplus, having spent considerably less than the state funding allocated to him and returned the balance to the state treasury, which the report cited as an example of careful use of public funds.

== Head of the Gilboa Regional Council ==
=== Elections ===
Nur was elected head of the Gilboa Regional Council in a by-election held on 3 June 2015, following the departure of long-serving council head Danny Atar, who left to chair the Jewish National Fund. Running as a resident of Gan Ner, Nur received 47% of the vote, defeating Gil Oz of Ein Harod (Meuhad) (30%) and Moti Cohen of Gan Ner (23%). His platform emphasized investment in formal and informal education, improved service to residents, strengthening the council's constituent communities, and transparency and public participation.

He was re-elected to a second term in the 2018 Israeli municipal elections with 57% of the vote.

In February 2024, ahead of the 2024 Israeli municipal elections, which had been postponed to 27 February because of the Gaza war, Nur announced that he would not seek a third term, saying that wartime was "not a time for campaigns, factionalism and blocs". He was succeeded by his predecessor, Danny Atar, who won the election with about 70% of the vote.

=== Education ===
During his tenure the council adopted an education vision drawn up with resident participation. The council opened its first democratic elementary school, and in September 2018 a new elementary school began operating near Beit Alfa; the school's construction was completed in 2022 at a cost of more than 25 million shekels. An early-childhood centre for diagnosis, treatment and enrichment was also established.

In 2017 the council received the President's Award for Israeli Hope in Education, presented by President Reuven Rivlin to local authorities for promoting partnership between the different sectors of Israeli society; Nur spoke at the ceremony on behalf of the local authorities. The council also received a fair-play award in sport and an award for children's and youth sports activity among regional councils.

=== Agriculture ===
Agriculture is the main land use and a principal source of livelihood in the council's area. In 2017 Nur was among the leaders of a national campaign by farmers against a government decision to raise water prices for agriculture, describing it as "a battle to save settlement in Israel". He also opposed the lowering of tariffs on imported fish, which the council argued would harm local fish farmers. The council established an agricultural committee, and promoted a plan under which the size and number of agricultural plots (nahalas) in its moshavim and older communities were increased.

=== Environment and energy ===
Under Nur the council promoted a master plan for open spaces intended to preserve the area's rural character, and replaced street lighting in its communities with LED fixtures as part of an energy efficiency programme. Following a public participation process, the council adopted a policy document on new energy projects that gives preference to renewable energy while applying the precautionary principle and considering cumulative environmental impact. On the basis of that policy, Nur led regional opposition to the construction of gas-fired power stations in the area.

In 2016 Nur reversed the previous administration's approval for the relocation of a Frutarom flavour-extract plant from the Haifa Bay area to the Gilboa, citing health and environmental concerns, and put the question to a residents' referendum, described as the first of its kind in Israel. According to the council, 99.8% of participating residents voted against the plant, and Frutarom subsequently abandoned the plan.

=== Infrastructure, Arab villages and employment ===
The council obtained government funding to upgrade infrastructure in its communities, including in those where new neighbourhoods were built. Following an appeal by Nur to the prime minister, the council's Arab villages were included in Government Resolution 922, the five-year plan for economic development of the Arab sector, after it had initially been indicated that they would be excluded because they belong to a mixed regional council rather than to separate Arab local authorities. The council also initiated a planning programme to map and regularize construction in its Arab villages, beginning with a pilot in Tayibe and Na'ura.

According to the council, it raised about 300 million shekels from government ministries for projects and programmes during the first three years of Nur's tenure. In the area of employment, the council promoted five industrial zones, including the conversion of part of the Mevo'ot HaGilboa industrial park into a business park for high-tech and biotechnology firms, and a Tadiran plant was planned on the site originally intended for Frutarom. Employment and family-support centres were also opened in the council's area.

=== Transparency ===
Nur's administration emphasized transparency and public participation: resident teams were set up to draft and implement the council's education vision, public consultation processes were held on environmental and energy matters, and council plenum and local planning committee meetings were opened to the public, filmed and posted on the council's website.

== Personal life ==
Nur is married to Dorit and has three daughters. He lives in the community settlement of Gan Ner, where he was active in community affairs for many years before his election.

Political offices
Preceded by Danny Atar	Head of the Gilboa Regional Council; 2015–2024	Succeeded by Danny Atar
