= Adirim =

Adirim: אַדִּירִים (Hebrew)

Hebrew transcription(s)
  - Official: Addirim
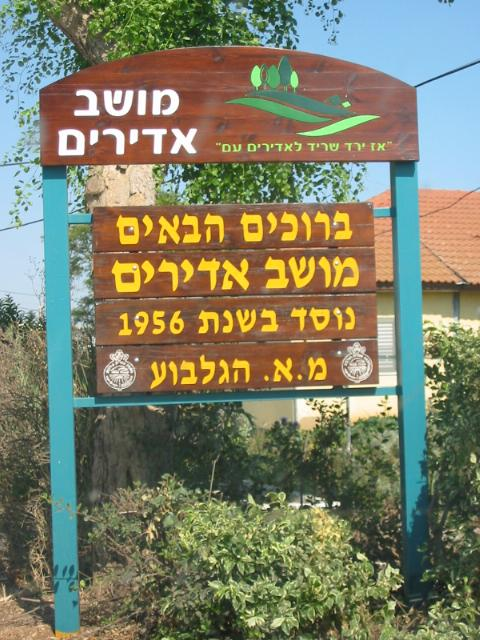
- Entrance sign
- Etymology: Lordly (plural)
- Location within Jezreel Valley region of Israel
- Coordinates: 32°32′57″N 35°16′18″E
- Country: Israel
- District: Northern
- Subdistrict: Jezreel
- Council: Gilboa
- Affiliation: Moshavim Movement
- Founded: 20 February 1956
- Founder: Moroccan Jews
- Population (2024): 428

Adirim (Hebrew: אַדִּירִים) is a small moshav in northern Israel. Located adjacent to Barak and Dvora and six kilometres south of Afula, it falls under the jurisdiction of Gilboa Regional Council. In 2024 its population was 428.

== Etymology ==
Adirim derives its name from the Bible; "Water he requested, (but) milk she gave him: in a lordly bowl she brought him cream." (Judges 5:25) Adirim is also mentioned in Judges 5:13: "Then down marched the remnant of the nobles." It commemorates the warriors of the nearby battle, led by the Biblical Deborah, as well as the Israeli soldiers who fought nearby in the War of Independence.

== History ==
The moshav founded on 20 February 1956 by immigrants from Morocco, the first of the Gush Hever moshavim. Its proximity to the Green Line made it a target for terrorist infiltrators in its early years.
