= Tamra, Jezreel Valley =

Tamra: טַמְרָה (Hebrew); طمرة (Arabic)
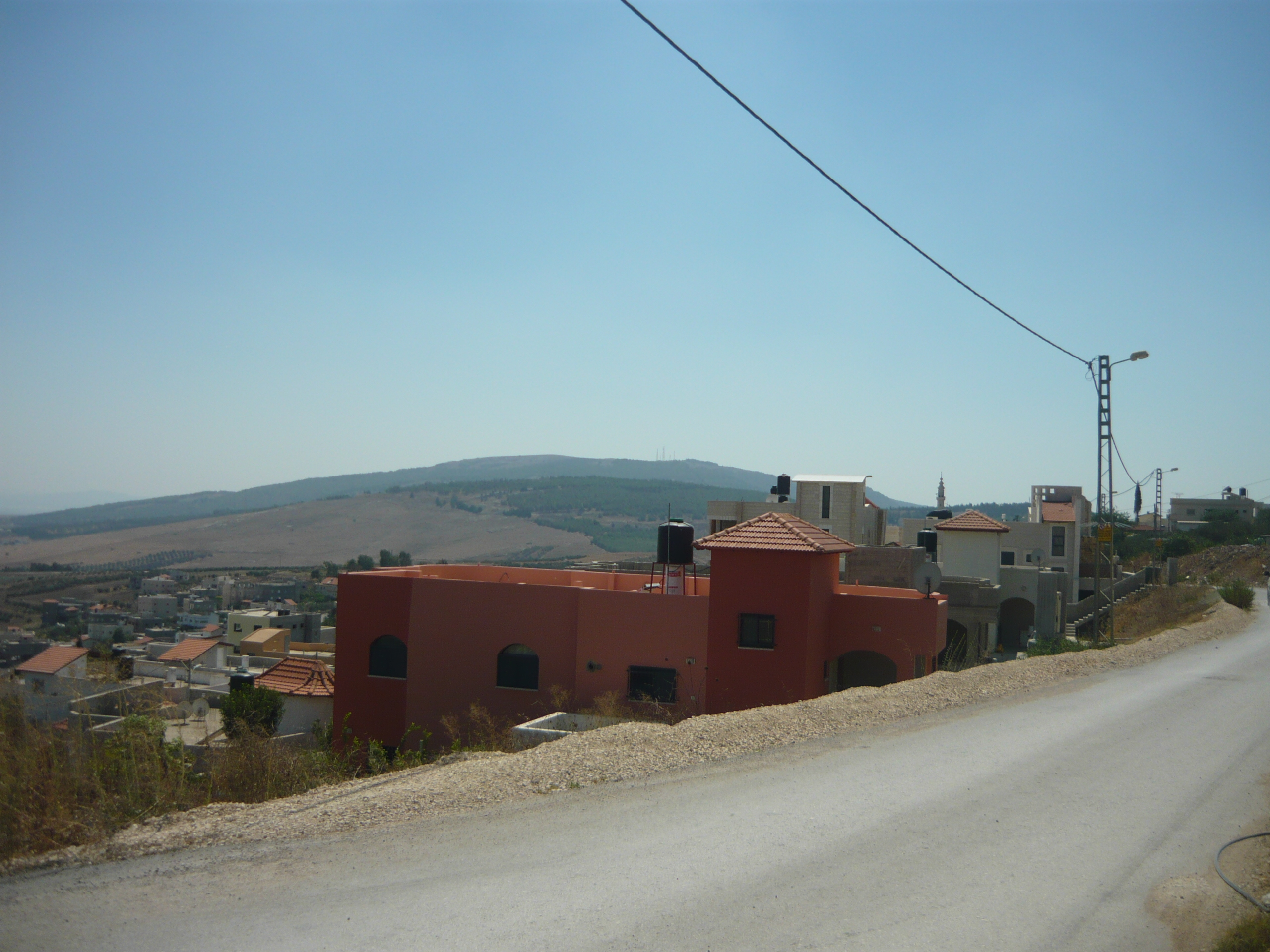
- Tamra 2010

- Location within Jezreel Valley region of Israel Location within Israel
- Coordinates: 32°38′5″N 35°24′8″E
- Grid position: 188/226 PAL
- Country: Israel
- District: Northern
- Subdistrict: Jezreel
- Council: Gilboa
- Population (2024): 1,727

Tamra (Arabic: طمرة; Hebrew: טַמְרָה or תַמְרָה) is an Arab village in north-eastern Israel. Located in the Jezreel Valley, it falls under the jurisdiction of Gilboa Regional Council. In 2024 it had a population of 1,727.

== Etymology ==
The name Tamra is derived from the Arabic to make a pit for storing corn & c.

== History ==
=== Metal ages ===
Remains from the Iron Age I era have been excavated. Remains from the Iron Age II, the Late Persian – Early Hellenistic, Roman and Byzantine periods have been found here.

=== Byzantine Empire ===
There was village at the site during the Byzantine period; tombs and remnants of two churches have been found. In the Byzantine and Early Muslim periods, there was an agricultural settlement here.

=== Caliphates ===
Remains from the Early Islamic (Umayyad & Abbasid) period have bern unearthed here, including Umayyad glass vessels and Abbasid pottery and a lamp. Remains dating to the Umayyad period (seventh–eighth centuries CE) have been excavated, together with housing remains dating to the Early Abbasid period (late eighth and early ninth centuries CE).

A basilica-style church was built here during the Umayyad period, with a dedication from 725 CE found in the middle. Mosaics belonging to the church have been excavated. The church was probably damaged in the 749 Galilee earthquake, after which its columns were replaced with square pilasters. The archaeological evidence indicates that a thriving Christian community existed here in the Umayyad and the Abbasid periods. Two complex winepress that were operated in the Umayyad and Abbasid periods have also been found, indicating widespread wine production during these periods.

Mamluk-period remains have also been found.

=== Ottoman Empire ===
Around the late 16th or early 17th centuries, during Ottoman rule, members of the Zu'biya clan settled in Tamra, where their descendants reside until today.

A map by Pierre Jacotin from Napoleon's invasion of 1799 may have noted the place, as a village.

In 1870–1871 an Ottoman census listed the village in the nahiya (sub-district) of Shafa al-Shamali. In 1875, the French explorer Victor Guérin visited Tamra and found it to be a village of about 120 inhabitants, living in adobe houses, or houses built of volcanic materials. He further noted:

This village has taken the place of an ancient town which formerly rose in an amphitheatre around an abundant spring, whose waters are received in a regular basin formerly vaulted. Everywhere considerable piles of stones, for the most part basaltic; the remains of overthrown houses strew the slopes of the hill. In the midst of these confused ruins I remarked, near the spring, the vestiges of a small church lying east and west and divided into three naves. It was ornamented with columns, of which several trunks yet remain. In the higher part of the city are still distinguished the remains of a second church, almost entirely destroyed, which was paved with mosaic, as is proven by the little cubes lying about on the ground.

In 1882, the PEF's Survey of Western Palestine (SWP) described Tumrah as "a village of middling size, perhaps 50 or 70 houses, situated on high ground, and surrounded by plough-land." They also noted that there were ruins on the south side of the village.

=== British Mandate ===
In the 1922 census of Palestine conducted by the British Mandate authorities, Thamra showed a population of 104, all Muslims, increasing in the 1931 census to 193, still all Muslims, in a total of 34 houses.

In the 1945 statistics Tamra had 240 inhabitants, 160 Arabs and 80 Jews, with a total of 9,436 dunams of land, according to an official land and population survey. Of this, 27 dunams were plantations and irrigable land, 9,090 dunams were used for cereals, while 6 dunams were built-up land.

=== Israel ===
Tamra became part of the State of Israel upon its foundation in 1948.

== See also ==
- Arab localities in Israel

== Bibliography ==
- Abu Fana, Mohammed (2009-12-30). "Tamra Final Report". Hadashot Arkheologiyot – Excavations and Surveys in Israel (121).
- Alexandre, Yardenna (2009-08-23). "Tamra Final Report". Hadashot Arkheologiyot – Excavations and Surveys in Israel (121).
- Barron, J.B., ed. (1923). Palestine: Report and General Abstracts of the Census of 1922. Government of Palestine.
- Conder, C.R.; Kitchener, H.H. (1882). The Survey of Western Palestine: Memoirs of the Topography, Orography, Hydrography, and Archaeology. Vol. 2. London: Committee of the Palestine Exploration Fund.
- Dauphin, C. (1998). La Palestine byzantine, Peuplement et Populations. BAR International Series 726 (in French). Vol. III : Catalogue. Oxford: Archeopress. ISBN 0-86054-905-4. (p. 734)
- Department of Statistics (1945). Village Statistics, April, 1945. Government of Palestine.
- Guérin, V. (1880). Description Géographique Historique et Archéologique de la Palestine (in French). Vol. 3: Galilee, pt. 1. Paris: L'Imprimerie Nationale.
- Hadawi, S. (1970). Village Statistics of 1945: A Classification of Land and Area ownership in Palestine. Palestine Liberation Organization Research Center.
- Karmon, Y. (1960). "An Analysis of Jacotin's Map of Palestine" (PDF). Israel Exploration Journal. 10 (3, 4): 155–173, 244–253. Archived from the original (PDF) on 2019-12-22.
- Mills, E., ed. (1932). Census of Palestine 1931. Population of Villages, Towns and Administrative Areas. Jerusalem: Government of Palestine.
- Mokary, Abdalla (2010-12-30). "Tamra". Hadashot Arkheologiyot – Excavations and Surveys in Israel (122).
- Palmer, E.H. (1881). The Survey of Western Palestine: Arabic and English Name Lists Collected During the Survey by Lieutenants Conder and Kitchener, R. E. Transliterated and Explained by E.H. Palmer. Committee of the Palestine Exploration Fund.
- Porat, Leea (2005-04-13). "Tamra". Hadashot Arkheologiyot – Excavations and Surveys in Israel (117).
- Porat, Leea (2007-12-16). "Tamra". Hadashot Arkheologiyot – Excavations and Surveys in Israel (119).
- Tepper, Y. (2007-08-16). "Tamra Final Report". Hadashot Arkheologiyot – Excavations and Surveys in Israel (119).
- Tepper, Y. (2011-09-11). "Tamra Preliminary Report". Hadashot Arkheologiyot – Excavations and Surveys in Israel (123).
- Tepper, Y. (2013-12-31). "Tamra Preliminary Report". Hadashot Arkheologiyot – Excavations and Surveys in Israel (125).
- Tepper, Y. (2013-12-08). "Tamra, in the Valley". Hadashot Arkheologiyot – Excavations and Surveys in Israel (125).
- Tsafrir, Y.; Leah Di Segni; Judith Green (1994). (TIR): Tabula Imperii Romani: Judaea, Palaestina. Jerusalem: Israel Academy of Sciences and Humanities. ISBN 965-208-107-8.
