= Taibe, Galilee =

Arab town in northern Israel

Taibe: טַּיִּבָּה (Hebrew); الطيبة (Arabic)
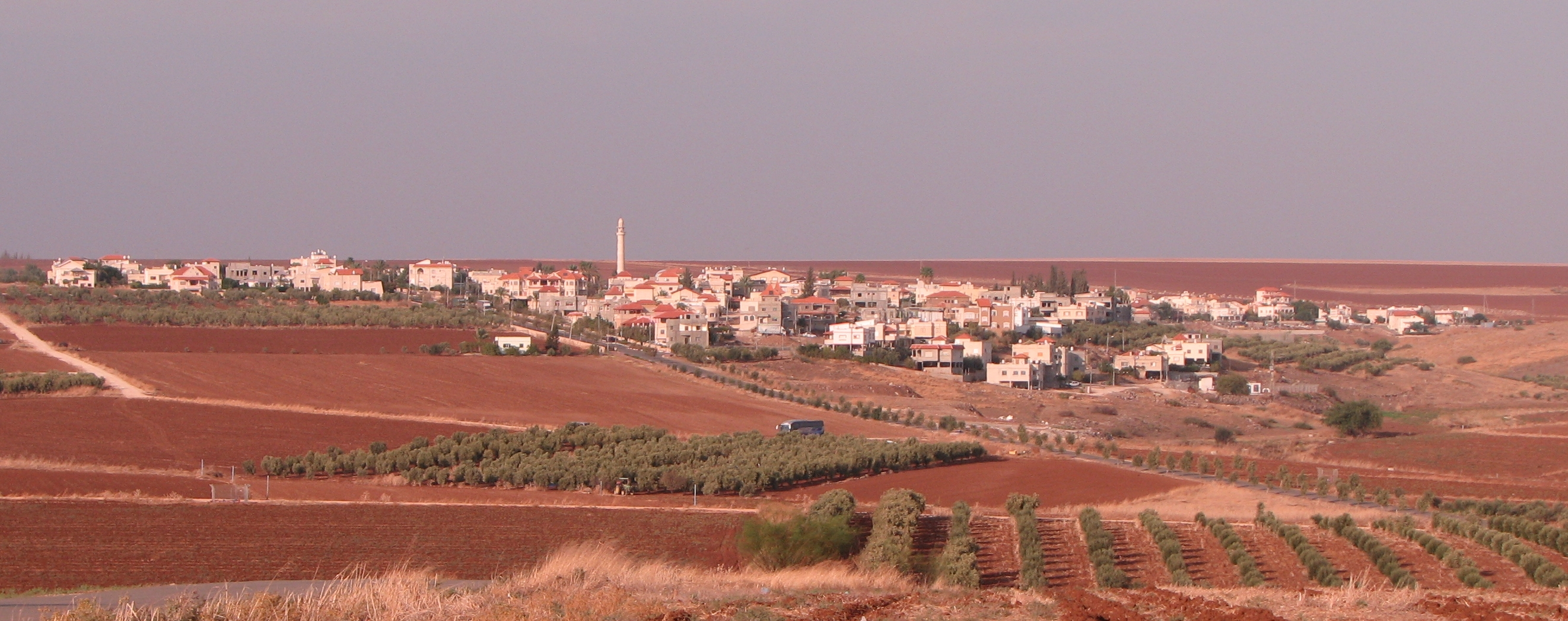
- Taibe, 2010

- Location within Jezreel Valley region of Israel
- Coordinates: 32°36′16″N 35°26′40″E
- Grid position: 192/223 PAL
- Country: Israel
- District: Northern
- Subdistrict: Jezreel
- Council: Gilboa
- Population (2024): 2,198

Taibe (Arabic: الطيبة, romanized: Al-Taybeh; Hebrew: טַּיִּבָּה), meaning "The goodly", or colloquially al-Tayiba al-Zu'biyya (الطيبة الزعبية) after its main clan, is a Muslim Arab village in northeastern Israel on the Issachar Plateau. It falls under the jurisdiction of Gilboa Regional Council. In 2024 it had a population of 2,198.

== History ==
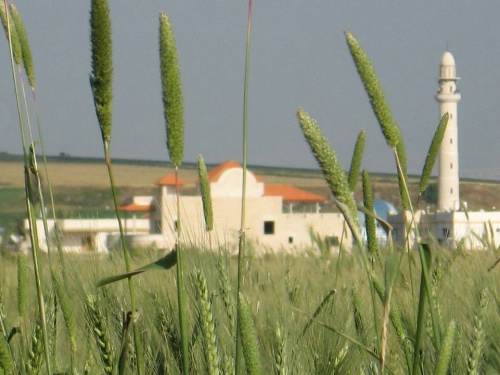
Taibe village view

Remains from the Hellenistic, Roman, Byzantine, Crusader, and Mamluk periods have been found. It has been proposed that Taibe was Tubi, listed among the places paying tribute to Thutmose III.

=== Biblical identification ===
Historical geographer Yeshayahu Press thought the site to be the biblical Hapharaim mentioned in Joshua 19:19 in connection with the tribe of Issachar, by a reversion of its name from what sounded like Afrin ("demons") to a euphemistic sound (lit. "the goodly"), as was common in other Arabic place-names.

=== Roman and Byzantine empires ===
North east of the village sarcophagus remains have been found. This area apparently functioned as a graveyard during the Roman and Byzantine eras.

In 2021, archaeologist announced the discovery of an engraved stone from the late 5th century from the frame of an entrance door of a church, with a mosaic Greek inscription. The inscription reads “Christ born of Mary."This work of the most God-fearing and pious bishop [Theodo]sius and the miserable Th[omas] was built from the foundation. Whoever enters should pray for them”. According to archaeologist Dr. Walid Atrash, Theodosius was one of the first Christian bishops and he served as the regional archbishop. This church was the first evidence of the Byzantine church’s existence in Taybeh.

=== Crusaders and Caliphates ===
During the Crusader period there was a castle here called (Le) Forbelet (in medieval Arabic: 'Afrabala). It was probably Hospitaller and dependent on nearby Belvoir. Yaqut (1179–1229) noted about the village, which he called Afrabala: "A place in the Jordan Ghaur (or low-land), near Baisan and Tabariyyah."

In July 1182 the castle was the background of the pitched large-scale Battle of Forbelet between Baldwin IV and Saladin. The castle was sacked by Saladin in 1183, and occupied by the Muslims besieging Belvoir in 1187-88. Parts of the castle keep's basement still survive, as do other installations from the Crusader period. Recent excavations indicate that new buildings were constructed alongside the partially destroyed Crusader castle in Mamluk and Ottoman times.

=== Ottoman Empire ===
Taibe was incorporated into the Ottoman Empire in 1517 with all of Palestine, and in 1596 it appeared in the tax registers under the name of Tayyibat al-Ism as being in the Nahiya of Shafa of the Liwa of Lajjun. It had a population of 13 Muslim households and paid taxes on wheat, barley, summer crops, and goats or beehives; a total of 5,300 Akçe. Pierre Jacotin named the village Taibeh on his map from 1799.

In 1870–1871 an Ottoman census listed the village as Tayiba-i Zu'bi, after its resident clan, in the nahiya (sub-district) of Shafa al-Shamali. In 1875, the French explorer Victor Guérin visited the village and described it as poor, but formerly an important city, while in 1882 the Palestine Exploration Fund's Survey of Western Palestine described Taibe as: "A straggling village, of moderate size, lying on flat ground, and containing several good stone houses. There is one in the middle of the village, belonging to the Sheikh, which is larger than the rest."

=== British Mandate ===
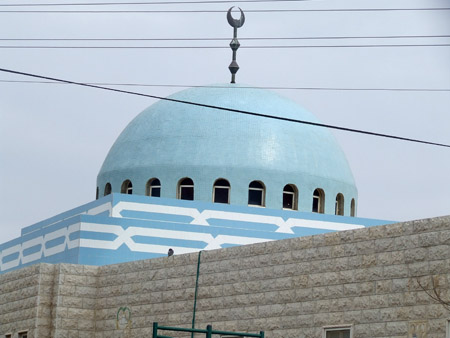
Taibe village mosque

In a census conducted in 1922 by the British Mandate authorities, Taibeh had a population of 220, all Muslim, while at the time of the 1931 census, At-Taiyiba had 43 occupied houses and a population of 186 Muslims.

In the 1945 statistics Taibe had a population of 280 Muslims counted with 150 Jews at Moledet) with 7,127 dunams of land, according to an official land and population survey. Of this, 7,103 dunams were used for cereals, while 22 dunams were built-up land.

=== Israel ===
Since 1948 Taibe has been part of the state of Israel. To mark Israel's 60th anniversary in 2008, the dome of the local mosque was painted in the Israeli colors, blue and white.

Nearly all the residents of Taibe are members of the Zuabi family, one of the larger 48-Palestinian clans.

== See also ==
- Arab localities in Israel

== Bibliography ==
- Abu Zidan, Fadi (2011-05-01). "Et-Taiyiba Final Report" (123). Hadashot Arkheologiyot – Excavations and Surveys in Israel.
- Atrash, Walid (2015-02-26). "Et-Taiyiba Final Report" (127). Hadashot Arkheologiyot – Excavations and Surveys in Israel.
- Barron, J. B., ed. (1923). Palestine: Report and General Abstracts of the Census of 1922. Government of Palestine.
- Conder, C.R.; Kitchener, H.H. (1882). The Survey of Western Palestine: Memoirs of the Topography, Orography, Hydrography, and Archaeology. Vol. 2. London: Committee of the Palestine Exploration Fund.
- Covello-Paran, Karen; Tepper, Y. (2008-08-24). "Et-Taiyiba Final Report" (120). Hadashot Arkheologiyot – Excavations and Surveys in Israel.
- Dalali-Amos, Edna (2016-07-12). "Et-Taiyiba Final Report" (128). Hadashot Arkheologiyot – Excavations and Surveys in Israel.
- Department of Statistics (1945). Village Statistics, April, 1945. Government of Palestine.
- Guérin, V. (1880). Description Géographique Historique et Archéologique de la Palestine (in French). Vol. 3: Galilee, pt. 1. Paris: L'Imprimerie Nationale.
- Hadawi, S. (1970). Village Statistics of 1945: A Classification of Land and Area ownership in Palestine. Palestine Liberation Organization Research Center.
- Hütteroth, W.-D.; Abdulfattah, K. (1977). Historical Geography of Palestine, Transjordan and Southern Syria in the Late 16th Century. Erlanger Geographische Arbeiten, Sonderband 5. Erlangen, Germany: Vorstand der Fränkischen Geographischen Gesellschaft. ISBN 3-920405-41-2.
- Karmon, Y. (1960). "An Analysis of Jacotin's Map of Palestine" (PDF). Israel Exploration Journal. 10 (3, 4): 155–173, 244–253. Archived from the original (PDF) on 2019-12-22.
- Le Strange, G. (1890). Palestine Under the Moslems: A Description of Syria and the Holy Land from A.D. 650 to 1500. Committee of the Palestine Exploration Fund.
- Mills, E., ed. (1932). Census of Palestine 1931. Population of Villages, Towns and Administrative Areas. Jerusalem: Government of Palestine.
- Mokary, Abdalla (2017-06-19). "Et-Taiyiba, Horbat Haddad" (129). Hadashot Arkheologiyot – Excavations and Surveys in Israel.
- Palmer, E.H. (1881). The Survey of Western Palestine: Arabic and English Name Lists Collected During the Survey by Lieutenants Conder and Kitchener, R. E. Transliterated and Explained by E.H. Palmer. Committee of the Palestine Exploration Fund.
- RHC Or vol. 4, 1898, Recueil des historiens des croisades (p. 345, cf p. 303)
- Pringle, D. (1997). Secular buildings in the Crusader Kingdom of Jerusalem: an archaeological Gazetter. Cambridge University Press. ISBN 9780521460101.
- Tepper, Y. (2012-04-16). "Et-Taiyiba, Survey, Final Report" (124). Hadashot Arkheologiyot – Excavations and Surveys in Israel.
- Tepper, Y.; Covello-Paran, Karen (2012-12-31). "Et-Taiyiba Final Report" (124). Hadashot Arkheologiyot – Excavations and Surveys in Israel.
