= Ram-On =

Ram-On: רָם אוֹן (Hebrew)
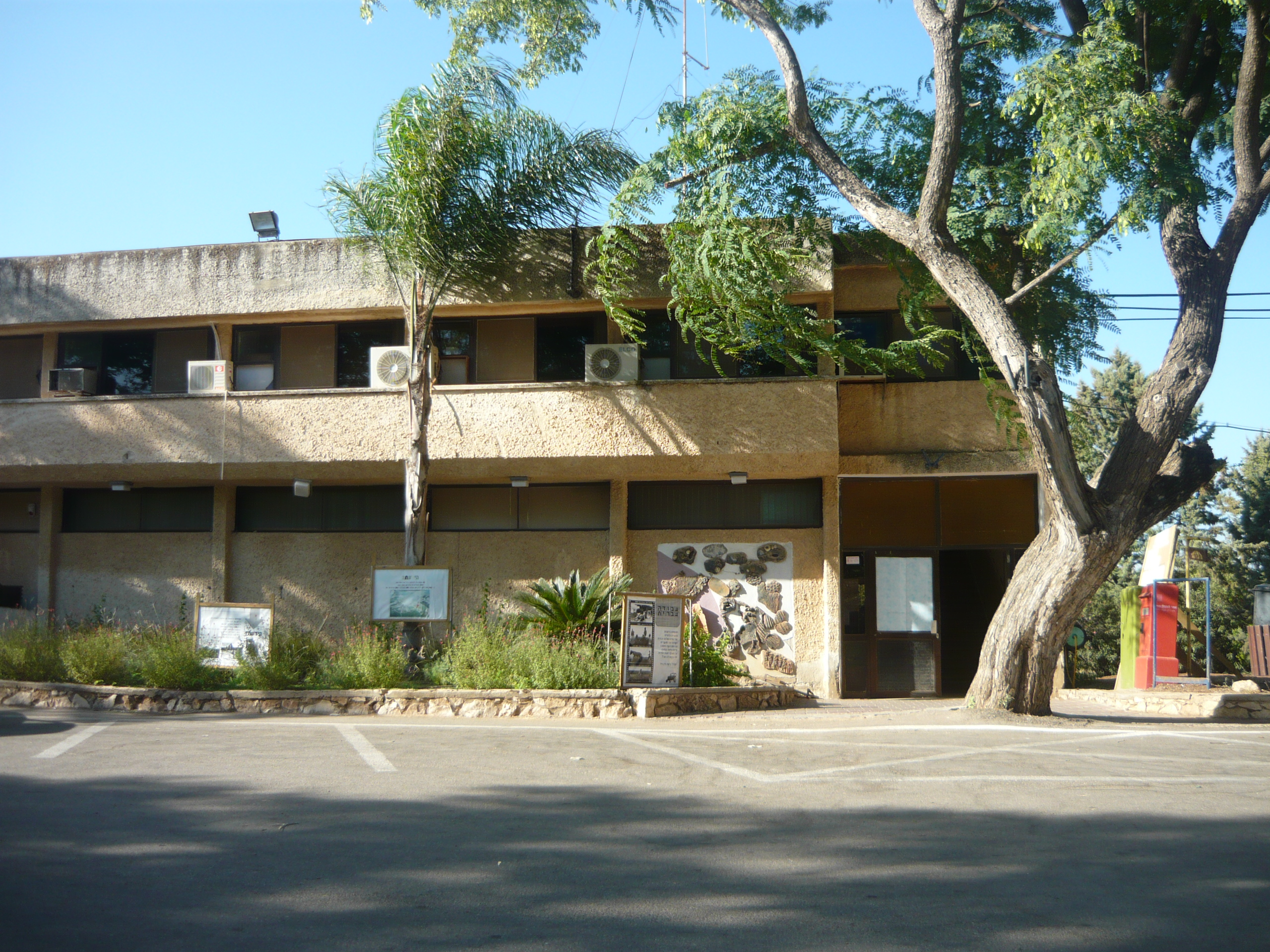

- Location within Jezreel Valley region of Israel
- Coordinates: 32°31′35″N 35°15′34″E
- Country: Israel
- District: Northern
- Subdistrict: Jezreel
- Council: Gilboa
- Affiliation: Moshavim Movement
- Founded: 1953
- Founder: Moshavniks
- Population (2024): 890

Ram-On (Hebrew: רָם אוֹן) is a moshav ovdim in northern Israel. Located in the Ta'anakh region, south of the Jezreel Valley, it falls under the jurisdiction of Gilboa Regional Council. In 2024, it had a population of 890.

== History ==
Ram-On was founded in 1953 by children of families from moshavim around Israel. They originally settled in Nurit on the Gilboa mountain, but in 1961, the community moved from Gilboa mountain to the present-day location of Ram-On. The moshav is named after Ram On Paldi, one of the founders of the community, who was killed in battle near Kerem Shalom in 1957.

== Economy ==
There is a factory in the moshav that manufactures thermoplastic materials.
