= Sandala, Israel =

Arab village in northern Israel

Sandala: צַנְדַלָה, סַנְדַלָה (Hebrew); صندلة (Arabic)
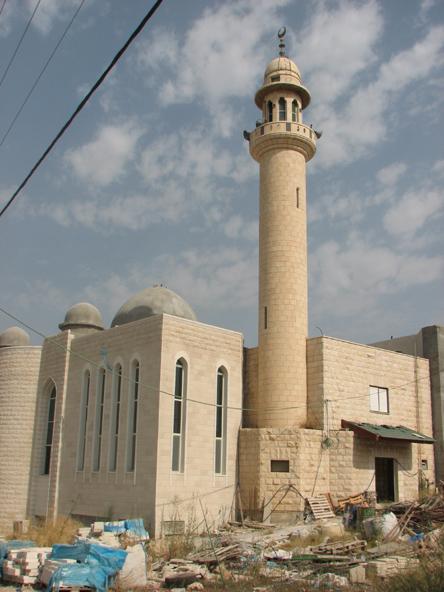
- Sandala mosque in 2007

- Location within Jezreel Valley region of Israel
- Coordinates: 32°31′21″N 35°19′25″E
- Grid position: 180/214 PAL
- Country: Israel
- District: Northern
- Subdistrict: Jezreel
- Council: Gilboa Regional Council
- Population (2024): 1,817

Sandala (Arabic: صندلة; Hebrew: צַנְדַלָה, סַנְדַלָה) is an Arab village in the Northern District of Israel. Near Afula, it falls under the jurisdiction of Gilboa Regional Council. In 2024 its population was 1,817.

== History ==
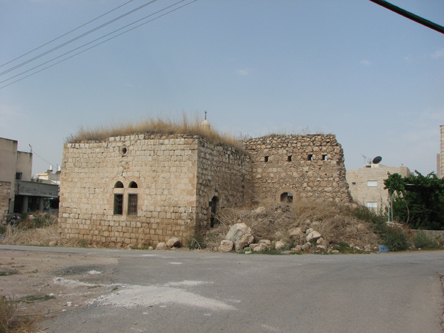
Old house in Sandala, 2007

The remains of a large building, possibly a church, from the Byzantine era have been excavated, Pottery remains from the Byzantine era have been found and pottery remains from the 7th and 8th century C.E. have been excavated.

In the nucleus of the ancient village, near the mosque, archaeological excavations have revealed pottery fragments dating to the early Islamic and Mamluk periods.

=== Ottoman Empire ===
In 1517 Sandala was incorporated into the Ottoman Empire with the rest of Palestine. During the 16th and 17th centuries, it belonged to Turabay Emirate (1517-1683), which encompassed also the Jezreel Valley, Haifa, Jenin, Beit She'an Valley, northern Jabal Nablus, Bilad al-Ruha/Ramot Menashe, and the northern part of the Sharon plain.

According to a local tradition, the present village was established in the 18th century in the late Ottoman era by two brothers from the nearby village Arranah, which is today part of the West Bank.

When Edward Robinson passed by Sandala in 1838, he described it as a "small site of ruined foundations," while Victor Guérin, who passed by in 1870, noted it as "a hamlet, situated on a mound."

In 1882 PEF's Survey of Western Palestine described it as a "small village on the edge of the plain, built of stone and mud, supplied by cisterns, and surrounded by plough-land."

=== British Mandate ===
In the 1922 census of Palestine, conducted by the British Mandate authorities, Sandala had a population of 146, all Muslims, increasing in the 1931 census to 189, still all Muslim, in a total of 36 houses.

In the 1945 statistics, Sandala had 270 inhabitants, all Muslims. They owned a total of 3,217 dunams of land, while 32 dunams were public, according to an official land and population survey. Of this, 2 dunams were plantations and irrigable land, 3,109 dunams were used for cereals, while 7 dunams were built-up land.

=== Israel ===
During the 1948 Arab–Israeli War, in March 1948, Palmach units destroyed "a number of houses" in the village. Sandala was captured by the Israeli Army and retaken by the Iraqi Army. Due to its location inside the Green Line, it became part of the State of Israel.

Andrew Petersen, an archaeologist specializing in Islamic architecture, visited the village in 1994. He described the new mosque in the center of the village, apparently constructed on older foundations. The area around the mosque formed the core of the old village, parts of which had been demolished, while the rest was scheduled for demolition. The remaining structures formed a square, containing various houses and courtyards. According to Petersen, some of the deserted houses appeared to incorporate earlier structures, including transverse arches and cross-vaulted rooms, possibly of a medieval origin.

== See also ==
- Arab localities in Israel

== Bibliography ==
- Alexandre, Yardenna (2009-09-29). "Sandala, Final Report" (121). Hadashot Arkheologiyot – Excavations and Surveys in Israel.
- Barron, J.B., ed. (1923). Palestine: Report and General Abstracts of the Census of 1922. Government of Palestine.
- Conder, C.R.; Kitchener, H.H. (1882). The Survey of Western Palestine: Memoirs of the Topography, Orography, Hydrography, and Archaeology. Vol. 2. London: Committee of the Palestine Exploration Fund.
- Dauphin, C. (1998). La Palestine byzantine, Peuplement et Populations. BAR International Series 726 (in French). Vol. III : Catalogue. Oxford: Archeopress. ISBN 0-860549-05-4.
- Department of Statistics (1945). Village Statistics, April, 1945. Government of Palestine.
- Guérin, V. (1874). Description Géographique Historique et Archéologique de la Palestine (in French). Vol. 2: Samarie, pt. 1. Paris: L'Imprimerie Nationale.
- Hadawi, S. (1970). Village Statistics of 1945: A Classification of Land and Area ownership in Palestine. Palestine Liberation Organization Research Center.
- Mills, E., ed. (1932). Census of Palestine 1931. Population of Villages, Towns and Administrative Areas. Jerusalem: Government of Palestine.
- Mokary, Abdalla (2008-10-05). "Sandala, Final Report" (120). Hadashot Arkheologiyot – Excavations and Surveys in Israel.
- Mokary, Abdalla (2012-07-16). "Sandala, Final Report" (124). Hadashot Arkheologiyot – Excavations and Surveys in Israel.
- Morris, Benny (2004). The Birth of the Palestinian Refugee Problem Revisited. Cambridge: Cambridge University Press. ISBN 978-0-521-00967-6.
- Palmer, E.H. (1881). The Survey of Western Palestine: Arabic and English Name Lists Collected During the Survey by Lieutenants Conder and Kitchener, R. E. Transliterated and Explained by E.H. Palmer. Committee of the Palestine Exploration Fund.
- Petersen, Andrew (2001). A Gazetteer of Buildings in Muslim Palestine (British Academy Monographs in Archaeology). Vol. I. Oxford University Press. ISBN 978-0-19-727011-0.
- Robinson, E.; Smith, E. (1841). Biblical Researches in Palestine, Mount Sinai and Arabia Petraea: A Journal of Travels in the year 1838. Vol. 3. Boston: Crocker & Brewster.
