= Gilboa Regional Council =

Gilboa מועצה אזורית הגלבוע
- Regional council
- Gilboa Regional Council
- Interactive map of Gilboa
- Location within Israel
- Coordinates: 32°33′01″N 35°23′42″E
- Country: Israel
- District: Northern
- Subdistrict: Jezreel
- Natural region: Harod Valley, Kokhav Plateau, Yizre'el Valley
- Established: 1949
- Administrative center: Ta'anakh intersection

Government
  - Head: Danny Atar

Area
  - Total: 252.1 km^{2} (97.3 sq mi)

Population (2024)
  - Total: 35,000
  - Density: 140/km^{2} (360/sq mi)
- Website: www.hagilboa.org.il

Gilboa Regional Council (Hebrew: מועצה אזורית הגלבוע, Mo'atza Azorit HaGilboa) is a regional council in the Northern District of Israel. The council administers 33 constituent communities with a total population of 35,000 spanning 252 km^{2} (97 sq mi) across Mount Gilboa, the Harod Valley, and the southern Jezreel Valley.

One year after the 1948 Arab–Israeli War the council was established to encompass a mix of agricultural and rural localities, including historic early 20th-century kibbutzim such as Ein Harod and Beit Alfa, planned moshavim in the Ta'anakh region established during the 1950s, several Arab villages and newer communities like Gan Ner. Gilboa has a diverse demographic composition, with Arab citizens making up roughly 40% of its residents. The regional economy focuses on agriculture, field crops, food processing, light manufacturing, and nature-based tourism centered around Mount Gilboa and Ma'ayan Harod.

== History ==
=== Antiquity and Middle Ages ===
The Gilboa ridge and the adjacent Harod and Jezreel valleys historically served as strategic transit corridors and military staging grounds. In the Hebrew Bible, Mount Gilboa was the site of the battle between the Israelites and the Philistines, in which King Saul and his sons, including Jonathan, died (1 Samuel 31). The spring at Ma'ayan Harod (the Well of Harod) is the site where the judge Gideon tested his warriors by their method of drinking water before engaging the Midianites (Judges 7).

In 1928, excavations during irrigation work at Kibbutz Beit Alfa uncovered the Beit Alfa synagogue, a 6th-century CE Byzantine-era Jewish house of worship featuring an intact zodiac mosaic pavement. In 1260, the Battle of Ain Jalut took place near the spring of Harod, in which the Mamluk Sultanate defeated the invading Mongol armies, stopping their westward advance into the Levant and Egypt.

=== Early Zionist pioneering and British Mandate (1920–1948) ===
Modern Jewish settlement in the Harod Valley began during the Third Aliyah under the British Mandate. In September 1921, members of Gdud HaAvoda established a pioneering encampment near Ma'ayan Harod, founding the collective community of Ein Harod. In December 1921, a group from the battalion branched off to establish Tel Yosef. That same month, immigrant families founded the moshav Kfar Yehezkel just west of the spring.

Throughout the 1920s and 1930s, the Jewish National Fund acquired land along the northern part of the Gilboa and across the eastern valley, which led to the establishment of several agricultural settlements. These included Geva (1921), Beit Alfa and Heftziba (1922), and Beit HaShita (1935). Members of Hashomer Hatzair and Blau-Weiss were responsible for much of the founding and development of these places. The pioneers drained seasonal malaria-infested swamps, introduced dairy farming and field crop cultivation, and developed the area into a major agrarian hub during the Mandate period.

=== Council establishment and the Ta'anakh project (1949–present) ===
After the 1948 Arab–Israeli War and the establishment of the State of Israel, the Gilboa Regional Council was officially incorporated in 1949 to administer the agricultural communities in the Harod and southern Jezreel valleys.

In the mid-1950s, the council expanded with the implementation of the Ta'anakh Project (Hebrew: מבצע תענך, Mivtza Ta'anakh), a planned regional development initiative directed by the Jewish Agency. Designed to absorb new Jewish immigrants primarily from North Africa and the Middle East, the project grouped agricultural moshavim around shared communal centers (merkazim). These were Merkaz Haver, consisting of the moshavim Adirim, Barak, and Dvora, Merkaz Yael, made up of Avital, Meitav, and Prazon and Merkaz Omen servicing Gadish, Mlea, and Nir Yafeh.

In 1952, an ideological schism within the HaKibbutz HaMeuhad movement divided the historic community of Ein Harod into two separate kibbutzim: Ein Harod (Ihud) (affiliated with Mapai) and Ein Harod (Meuhad) (affiliated with Mapam).

During the late 20th and early 21st centuries the council started developing community settlements (yishuvim kehilatiyim). In 1987, Gan Ner was established on the northwestern part of Mount Gilboa, subsequently expanding to become the council's most populous locality. The council also integrated adjacent Arab villages and, during the 2000s, pursued cross-border economic cooperation with the neighboring Jenin Governorate.

== Demographics ==
According to the Israel Central Bureau of Statistics, the population of the Gilboa Regional Council was approximately 35,000 as of the mid-2020s, distributed across 33 localities. The council possesses one of the most demographically integrated populations among Israeli regional councils, comprising roughly 60% Jewish residents and 40% Arab (predominantly Sunni Muslim) residents.

On the CBS Socioeconomic Index, which ranks local authorities on a scale of 1 (lowest) to 10 (highest), Gilboa is ranked 6.

Population breakdown by settlement type (2024 CBS data)
Settlement Category	Number of Communities	Total Population	Key Localities
Kibbutzim	8	6,758	Beit HaShita, Beit Alfa, Ein Harod (Meuhad), Heftziba, Yizre'el, Geva, Ein Harod (Ihud), Tel Yosef
Moshavim	14	9,314	Kfar Yehezkel, Moledet, Magen Shaul, Ram-On, Ramat Tzvi, Nir Yafeh, Avital
Arab villages	5	12,963	Muqeible, Na'ura, Taibe, Sandala, Tamra
Community settlements & centers	6	5,518	Gan Ner (largest locality), Merkaz Haver, Merkaz Omen, Gidona, Nurit, Merkaz Yael
Total	33	34,553	

Historical population
Year	Pop.	±%
1972	10,500	—
1983	13,600	+29.5%
1995	15,800	+16.2%
2008	24,300	+53.8%
2022	32,947	+35.6%
2024	34,420	+4.5%

== Governance and politics ==
=== Council administration ===
Gilboa Regional Council is governed by elected representatives from its 33 localities, led by the Head of the Regional Council (ראש המועצה, Rosh HaMo'atza). The council head is elected directly in a popular two-round system, while individual delegates represent specific member communities.

=== Leadership ===
Since 1949 the council has been led by eight administrations:

Heads of Gilboa Regional Council
Name	Term of Office	Home Locality / Notes
Tuvia Ben-David	1949–1959	First council head following municipal incorporation
Meir Lanir	1959–1970	Kibbutz Ein Harod
Moshe Ben-Zvi	1970–1977	Kibbutz Tel Yosef
Nahum Sarig	1977–1985	Kibbutz Beit HaShita; former commander of the Negev Brigade
Avraham Yariv	1985–1994	Kibbutz Tel Yosef
Danny Atar	1994–2015	Moshav Gan Ner / Dvora; later served as MK and Chairman of KKL-JNF
Oved Nur	2015–2024	Kibbutz Ein Harod (Ihud); elected in a 2015 special election
Danny Atar	2024–present	Returned to municipal office following the 2024 Israeli municipal elections

=== Voting patterns ===
In the 2022 Israeli legislative election, approximately 47% of voters supported parties of the center-left bloc (led by Yesh Atid and National Unity), 28% voted for the right-wing and religious bloc (led by Likud), and 24% voted for Arab parties (primarily Hadash–Ta'al and United Arab List).

In the 2026 election, approximately 39% of voters supported parties of the center-left bloc (led by Yashar and Together), 22% voted for the right-wing and religious bloc (led by Likud), and 35% voted for Arab parties (the Joint List and Ra'am). An additional 2 percent voted for the Reservists, and 1.3 percent voted for Amcha Yisrael. Voter turnout increased 36 percent from the 2022 election.

=== International partnerships ===
Through the Jewish Agency for Israel's Partnership2Gether program, the Gilboa Regional Council and the neighboring city of Afula maintain a regional and cultural partnership with the Southern New England Consortium (SNEC), encompassing Jewish communities across Connecticut and Massachusetts.

== Economy and infrastructure ==
=== Agriculture and food production ===
Agriculture is important to the regional economy. Irrigation is supplied by regional water reclamation facilities, local reservoirs, and the National Water Carrier of Israel. The primary agricultural branches include:

- Field crops and horticulture: Cultivation of wheat, cotton, tomatoes, watermelons, and citrus groves across the Harod and Jezreel valleys.
- Greenhouses and floriculture: Greenhouse farming, particularly for export vegetables, spices, and flowers, centered in the moshavim of the Ta'anakh region.
- Dairy and livestock: Dairy farming and poultry facilities concentrated in the Harod Valley kibbutzim which supply regional dairy processing centers.

=== Industry and manufacturing ===
Industrial operations are primarily concentrated in kibbutz enterprises and designated regional commercial zones:

- Specialty vehicles: Beit Alfa Technologies (BAT), founded by Kibbutz Beit Alfa, designs and manufactures specialized emergency vehicles, airport crash tenders, and internationally exported riot-control vehicles.
- Plastics and polymers: Polyram Plastic Industries, established in Kibbutz Ram-On, is an international manufacturer of high-performance thermoplastic compounds traded on the Tel Aviv Stock Exchange (TASE: PLRM). Kibbutz Heftziba operates Palgal Plastic Industries, producing polyethylene piping and cross-linked infrastructure systems.
- Food processing: Kibbutz Beit HaShita is home to the Beit HaShita food processing factory, established in 1938, which is one of Israel's largest domestic producers and exporters of pickled vegetables, canned olives, and olive oil.

=== Tourism and heritage ===
The Ma'ayan Harod National Park is a tourist destination situated at the base of Mount Gilboa. It features a natural freshwater spring, recreational parklands, the burial site of Yehoshua Hankin, and the historic Hankin House museum. The Beit Alfa Synagogue National Park is also located in this council. It preserves an excavated 6th-century CE Byzantine era synagogue featuring an intact zodiac mosaic pavement.

== List of communities ==
Gilboa Regional Council administers 33 recognized localities, categorized into kibbutzim, moshavim, Arab villages, and community settlements.

Constituent Communities of Gilboa Regional Council
Name	Hebrew Name	Type	Established	Sub-region / Affiliation	Population (2024 CBS)
Adirim	אדירים	Moshav	1956	Ta'anakh (Haver bloc)	427
Avital	אביטל	Moshav	1953	Ta'anakh (Yael bloc)	637
Barak	ברק	Moshav	1956	Ta'anakh (Haver bloc)	438
Beit Alfa	בית אלפא	Kibbutz	1922	Harod Valley	1,216
Beit HaShita	בית השיטה	Kibbutz	1935	Harod Valley	1,467
Dvora	דבורה	Moshav	1956	Ta'anakh (Haver bloc)	339
Ein Harod (Ihud)	עין חרוד (איחוד)	Kibbutz	1921 (split 1952)	Harod Valley	583
Ein Harod (Meuhad)	עין חרוד (מאוחד)	Kibbutz	1921 (split 1952)	Harod Valley	860
Gadish	גדיש	Moshav	1956	Ta'anakh (Omen bloc)	359
Gan Ner	גן נר	Community settlement	1987	Mount Gilboa slopes	2,624
Geva	גבע	Kibbutz	1921	Harod Valley	622
Gidona	גדעונה	Community settlement	1949	Harod Valley	521
Heftziba	חפציבה	Kibbutz	1922	Harod Valley	837
Kfar Yehezkel	כפר יחזקאל	Moshav	1921	Harod Valley	1,224
Magen Shaul	מגן שאול	Moshav	1976	Ta'anakh	915
Meitav	מיטב	Moshav	1954	Ta'anakh (Yael bloc)	595
Merkaz Haver	מרכז חבר	Rural center	1958	Ta'anakh (Haver bloc)	1,073
Merkaz Omen	מרכז אומן	Rural center	1958	Ta'anakh (Omen bloc)	955
Merkaz Yael	מרכז יעל	Rural center	1960	Ta'anakh (Yael bloc)	64
Mlea	מלאה	Moshav	1956	Ta'anakh (Omen bloc)	377
Moledet	מולדת	Moshav shitufi	1937	Issachar Plateau	1,211
Muqeible	מוקייבלה	Arab village	19th century	Southern plain	4,703
Na'ura	נאעורה	Arab village	16th century	Issachar Plateau	2,490
Nir Yafeh	ניר יפה	Moshav	1956	Ta'anakh (Omen bloc)	692
Nurit	נורית	Community settlement	1950 (re-est. 2010s)	Mount Gilboa ridge	281
Prazon	פרזון	Moshav	1953	Ta'anakh (Yael bloc)	420
Ram-On	רם-און	Moshav ovdim	1960	Ta'anakh	890
Ramat Tzvi	רמת צבי	Moshav	1942	Issachar Plateau	790
Sandala	סנדלה	Arab village	16th century	Southern plain	1,817
Taibe	טייבה	Arab village	18th century	Issachar Plateau	2,226
Tamra	תמרה	Arab village	Ottoman period	Issachar Plateau	1,727
Tel Yosef	תל יוסף	Kibbutz	1921	Harod Valley	546
Yizre'el	יזרעאל	Kibbutz	1948	Jezreel Valley	627
Total		33 Communities			35,090
