= Gadish =

Gadish: גָּדִישׁ (Hebrew)
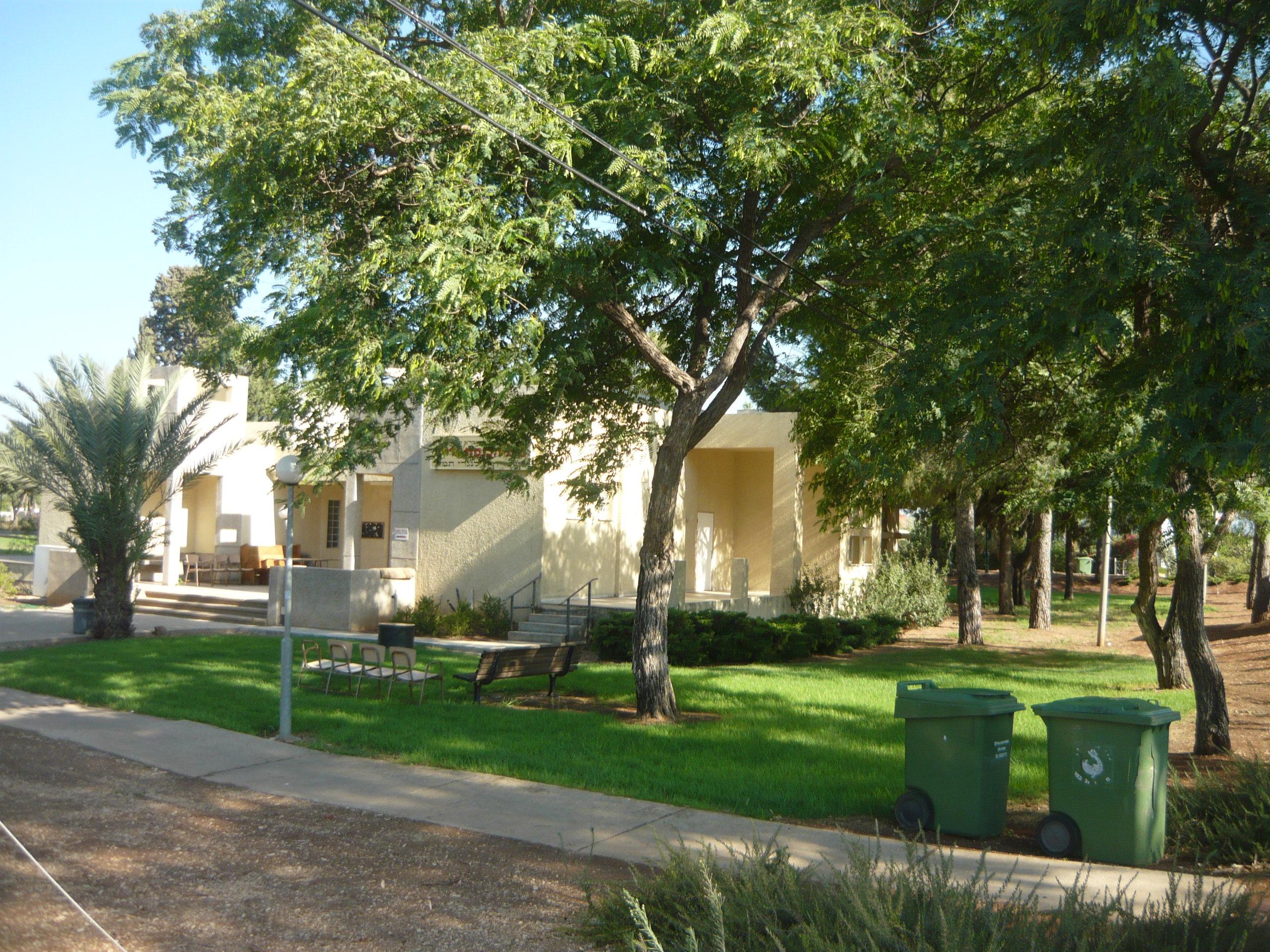
- Gadish synagogue
- Etymology: Heaping
- Location within Jezreel Valley region of Israel
- Coordinates: 32°33′35″N 35°14′41″E
- Country: Israel
- District: Northern
- Subdistrict: Jezreel
- Council: Gilboa
- Affiliation: Moshavim Movement
- Founded: 1956
- Founder: Moroccan Jews
- Population (2024): 359

Gadish (Hebrew: גָּדִישׁ) is a moshav in northern Israel. Located in the Ta'anakh region, it falls under the jurisdiction of Gilboa Regional Council. In 2024 it had a population of 359.

== History ==
The moshav was founded in 1956 by immigrants to Israel from Morocco as part of the program to settle the Ta'anakh region. The name Gadish means "heaping", in the sense that a person has more than enough agricultural produce.

On January 12, 2003, two Palestinian terrorists, armed with guns, who illegally infiltrated into Israel, entered Gadish and killed Eli Biton, an Israeli citizen. They were then killed in an exchange of fire with an IDF force.
