= Ramat Tzvi =

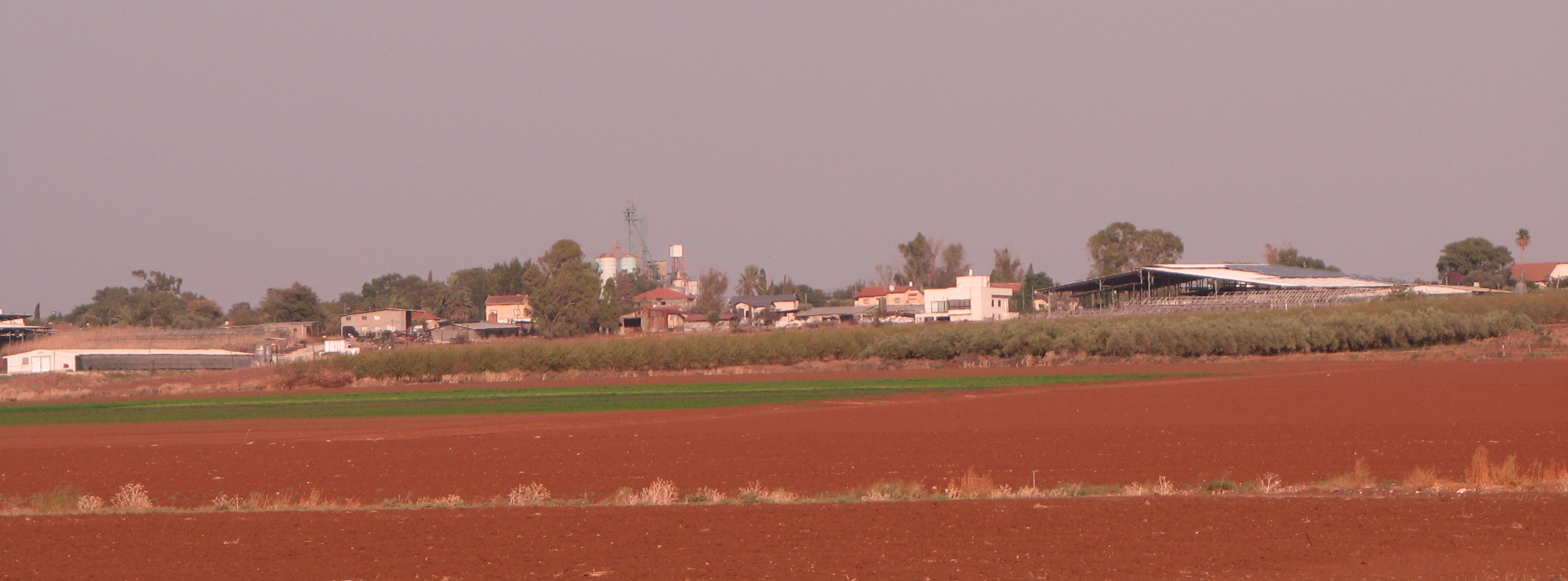

- Location within Jezreel Valley region of Israel
- Coordinates: 32°35′25″N 35°24′52″E
- Country: Israel
- District: Northern
- Subdistrict: Jezreel
- Council: Gilboa
- Affiliation: Moshavim Movement
- Founded: 1942
- Population (2024): 791
- Website: www.ramat-zvi.org.il

Ramat Tzvi (Hebrew: רָמַת צְבִי, lit. Zvi Heights) is a moshav in north-eastern Israel. Located between Afula and Beit She'an, it falls under the jurisdiction of Gilboa Regional Council. In 2024 it had a population of 791.

== History ==
The moshav was established in 1942 and was named after Henry Tzvi Monsky, an American lawyer who was the first international president of B'nai B'rith.
