= Meitav, Israel =

Meitav
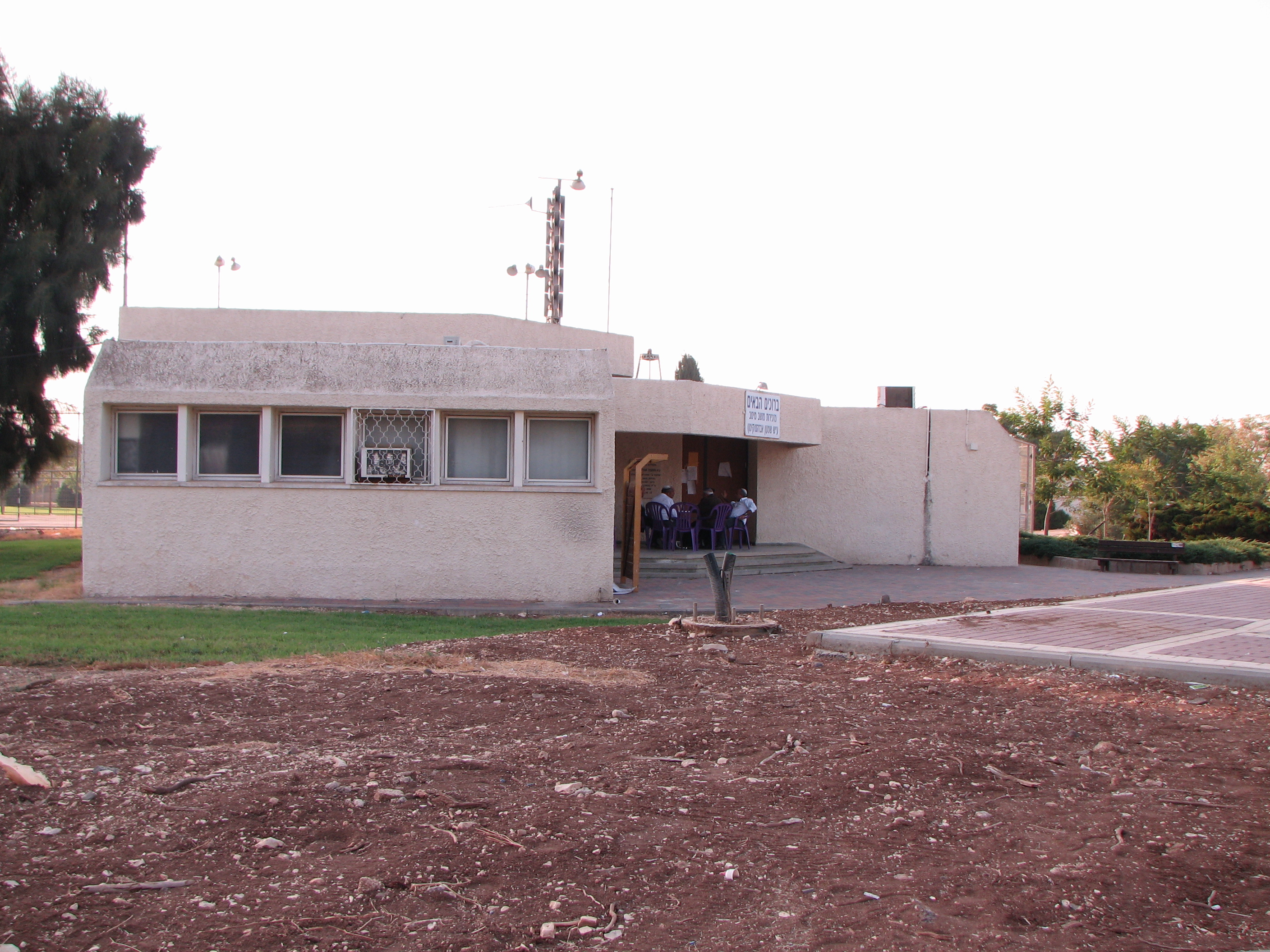
- Village office

- Location within Jezreel Valley region of Israel
- Coordinates: 32°32′48″N 35°18′2″E
- Country: Israel
- District: Northern
- Subdistrict: Jezreel
- Council: Gilboa
- Affiliation: Moshavim Movement
- Founded: 1954
- Founder: Kurdish and Iranian immigrants
- Population (2024): 595

Meitav (Hebrew: מֵיטָב, lit. Utmost, best) is a moshav in north-eastern Israel. Located in the Ta'anakh region, it falls under the jurisdiction of Gilboa Regional Council. In 2024 it had a population of 595.

== History ==
The moshav was established in 1954 by immigrants from Kurdistan and Iraq, on the land of the Palestinian village of Al-Mazar, which had been depopulated in the 1948 Arab-Israeli War. The third settlement to be founded in the Ta'anakh, it was initially named Ta'anakh Gimel (lit. Ta'anakh 3). The name derives from Bereshit/Genesis 47,11: "Joseph ... gave them property in the best part of the land."
