= Heftziba =

Kibbutz in northern Israel

Heftziba: חפציבה (Hebrew)
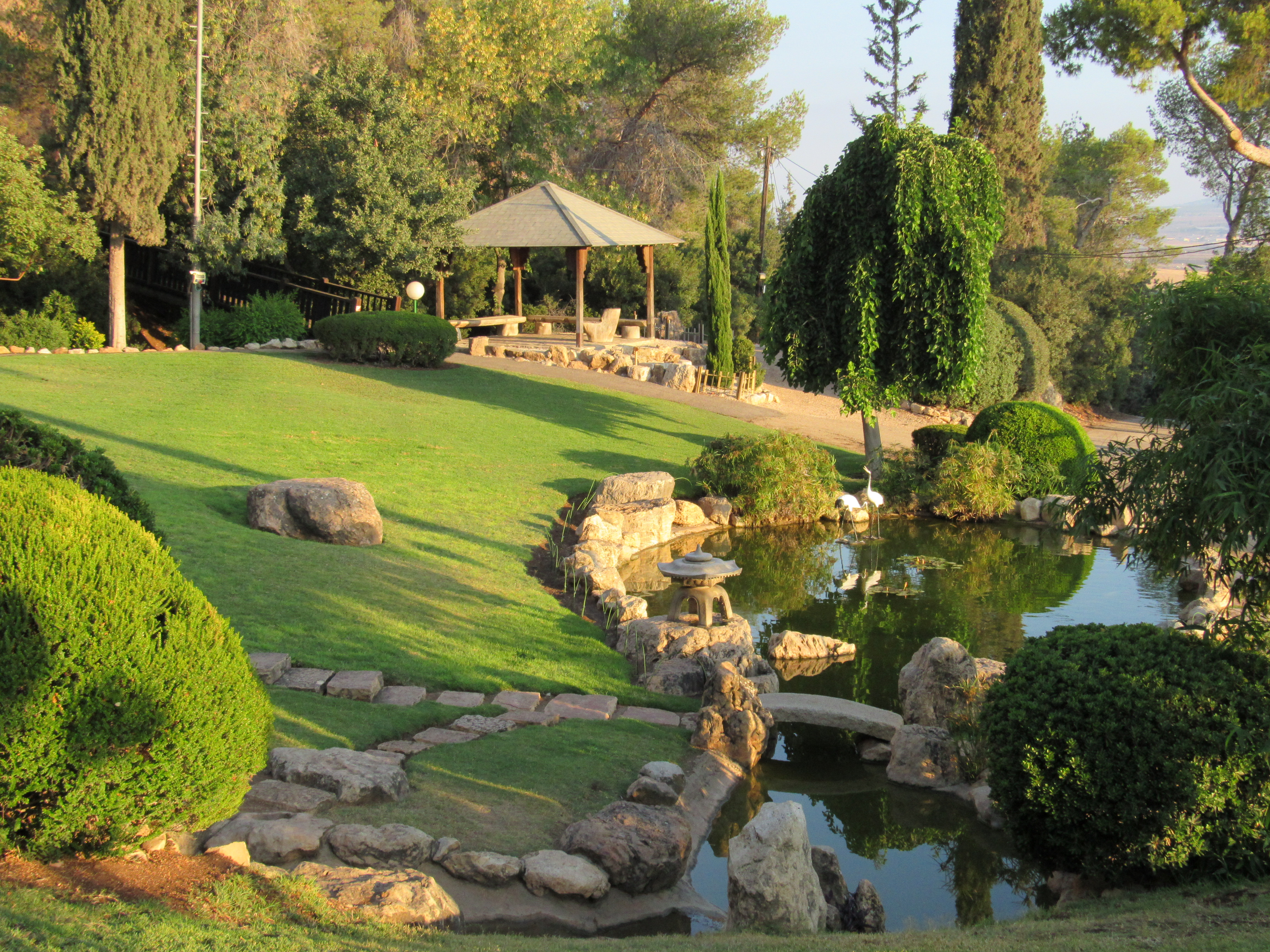

- Location within Jezreel Valley region of Israel Location within Israel
- Coordinates: 32°31′5″N 35°25′31″E
- Country: Israel
- District: Northern
- Subdistrict: Jezreel
- Council: Gilboa
- Affiliation: Kibbutz Movement
- Founded: 1922
- Founder: Czechoslovak and German Jews
- Population (2024): 836

Heftziba (Hebrew: חֶפְצִיבָּהּ) is a kibbutz in northern Israel. Located on the boundaries of the Jezreel and Beit She'an Valleys between the cities of Afula and Beit She'an, it falls under the jurisdiction of Gilboa Regional Council. In 2024 it had a population of 836.

== History ==
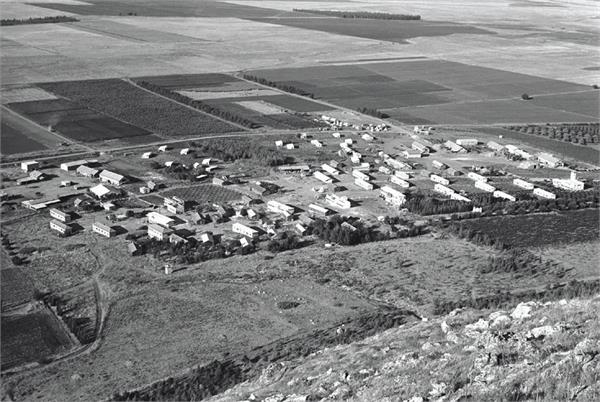
Heftziba 1937

The kibbutz was founded in 1922 by Jewish immigrants from Czechoslovakia and Germany. It was named after the farm adjacent to Hadera, where the original settlers worked before they relocated and founded the community. The name, chosen by Olga Hankin, derives from the Bible, where God speaks about his love for Israel: "My delight in her." (Isaiah 62:4).

According to the 1922 census of Palestine conducted in 1922 by the British Mandate authorities, Heftziba had a population of 125 inhabitants, consisting of 123 Jews and 2 Muslims.

On Thursday, July 31, 1986, at approximately 5:00 PM, nine teenage members of the kibbutz and their driver were killed following a head-on collision with a semi-trailer while driving back from a summer camp. The disaster left a mark of terrible sadness on the kibbutz, and a long-standing conflict between some of the kibbutz members.

== Archaeology ==
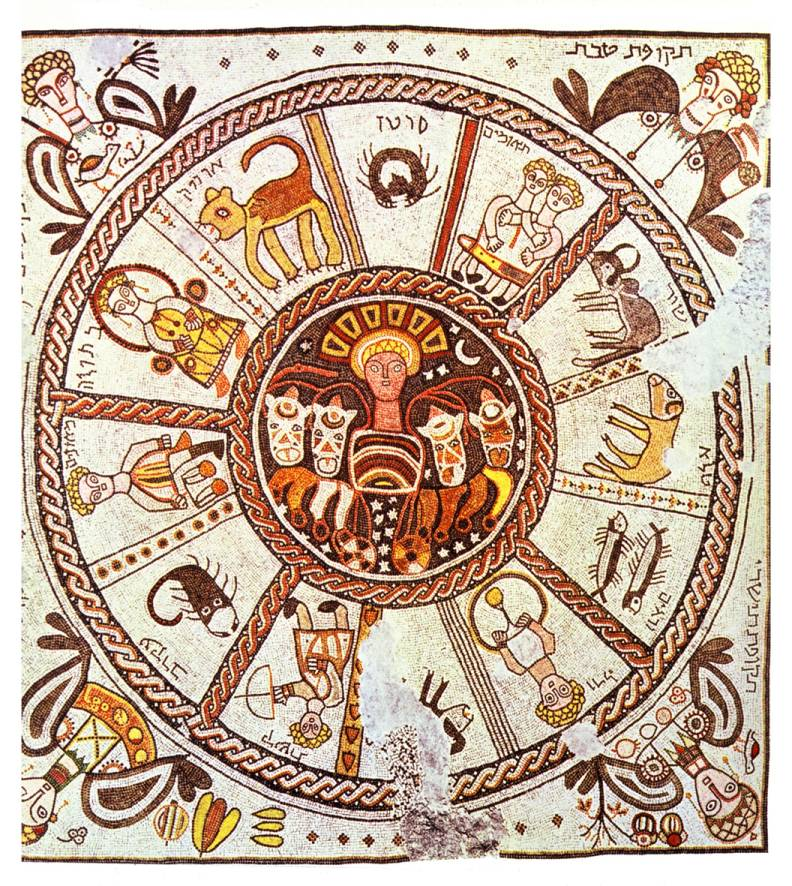
The zodiac mosaic in the 6th century Beit Alfa synagogue

The Beth Alpha Synagogue National Park is located in the kibbutz, not, as many assume, at the adjacent kibbutz with the same name, Beit Alfa. It contains an ancient Byzantine-era synagogue with a mosaic floor depicting the lunar Hebrew months as they correspond to the signs of the zodiac.

== Makuya ==
Makuya students have been sent to kibbutzim in Israel to study Hebrew and the biblical background. Some of them continue their academic studies in universities. The primary kibbutz the Makuya students stay at is Heftziba.

== Notable people ==
- Arthur Koestler was interested in joining the kibbutz, but his application was turned down.
- Keren Regal born in the Kibbutz, is the youngest Olympic participant ever for Israel.
