= Mle'a =

Mle'a: מְלֵאָה (Hebrew)
- Location within Jezreel Valley region of Israel
- Coordinates: 32°33′48″N 35°14′14″E
- Country: Israel
- District: Northern
- Subdistrict: Jezreel
- Council: Gilboa
- Affiliation: Moshavim Movement
- Founded: 1956
- Founder: Moroccan Jewish immigrants
- Population (2024): 377

Mle'a (Hebrew: מְלֵאָה, lit. whole yield) is a moshav in northern Israel. Located in the Ta'anakh region, it falls under the jurisdiction of Gilboa Regional Council. In 2024 it had a population of 377.

== History ==
It was founded in 1956 by Jewish immigrants and refugees to Israel from Morocco in the program to settle the Ta'anakh region. However, by the end of 1957 most of the original settlers moved out, with Jewish immigrants from Poland moving in to replace them. Most residents make a living from agriculture and raising livestock.

The name Mle'a relates to agriculture and is taken from the Bible: "lest the whole yield of the seed and of the fruit is forfeited to the sanctuary." (Deuteronomy 22:9)
