= Gidona =

Gidona: גִּדְעוֹנָה (Hebrew)
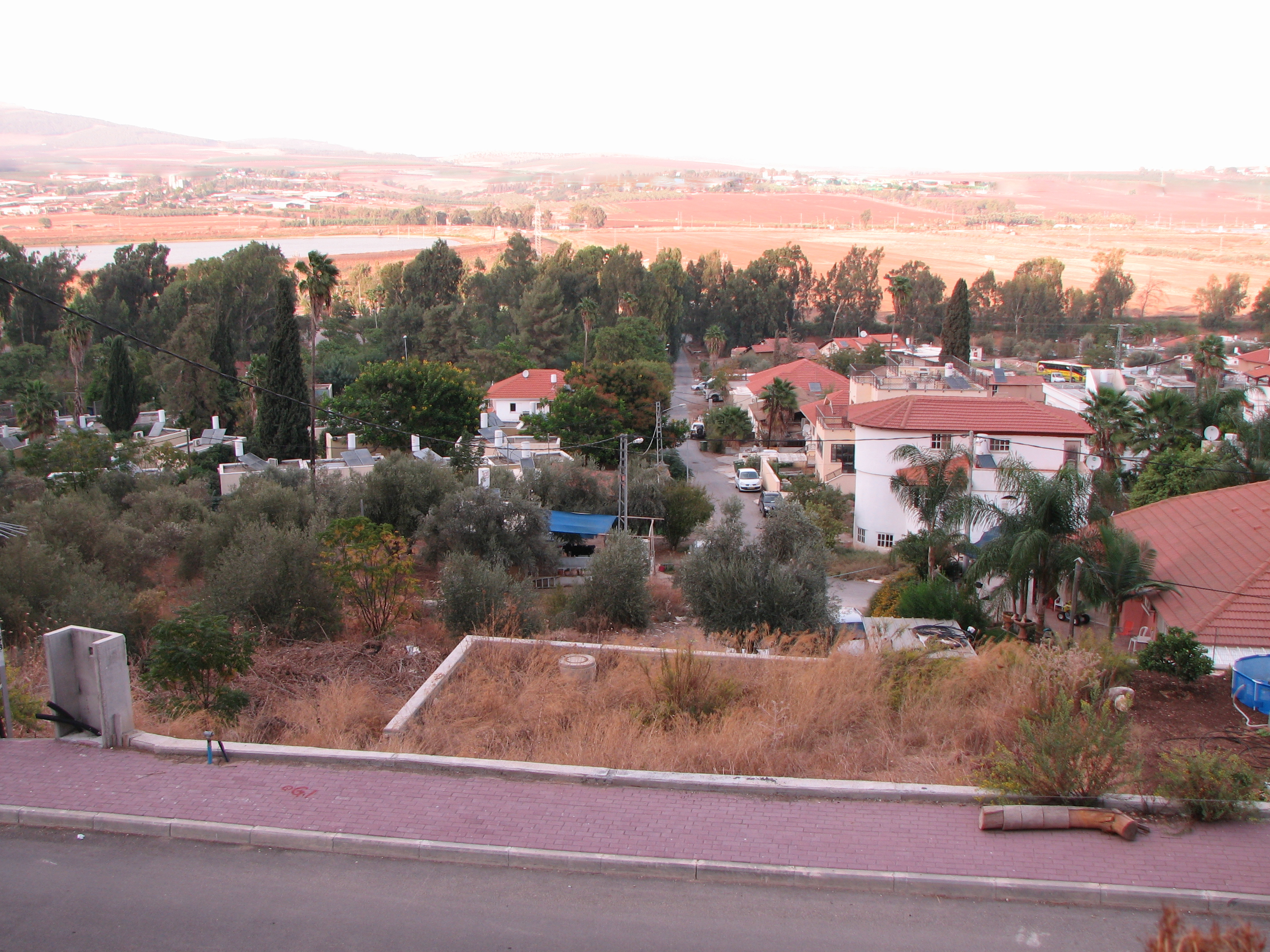

- Location within Jezreel Valley region of Israel
- Coordinates: 32°32′57″N 35°21′28″E
- Country: Israel
- District: Northern
- Subdistrict: Jezreel
- Council: Gilboa
- Founded: 1949
- Founder: Immigrants from Yemen
- Population (2024): 521

Gidona or Gid'onah (Hebrew: גִּדְעוֹנָה) is a community settlement in northern Israel. Located near Ein Harod, it falls under the jurisdiction of Gilboa Regional Council. In 2024 it had a population of 521.

== History ==
Gidona was founded in 1949 as a moshav of workers by immigrants to Israel from Yemen. The cemetery of the first settlers of Ein Harod and Tel Yosef is located nearby. In the 1960s the moshav became a community settlement.

Gidona is named after the prophet Gidon, who selected his soldiers for the war against Midyan in the nearby land, as described in the Book of Judges (f.e. chapter 7, verse 1).

An ancient quarry is located on the outskirts of Gidona, on the lower slopes of the Gilboa.
