= Nir Yafeh =

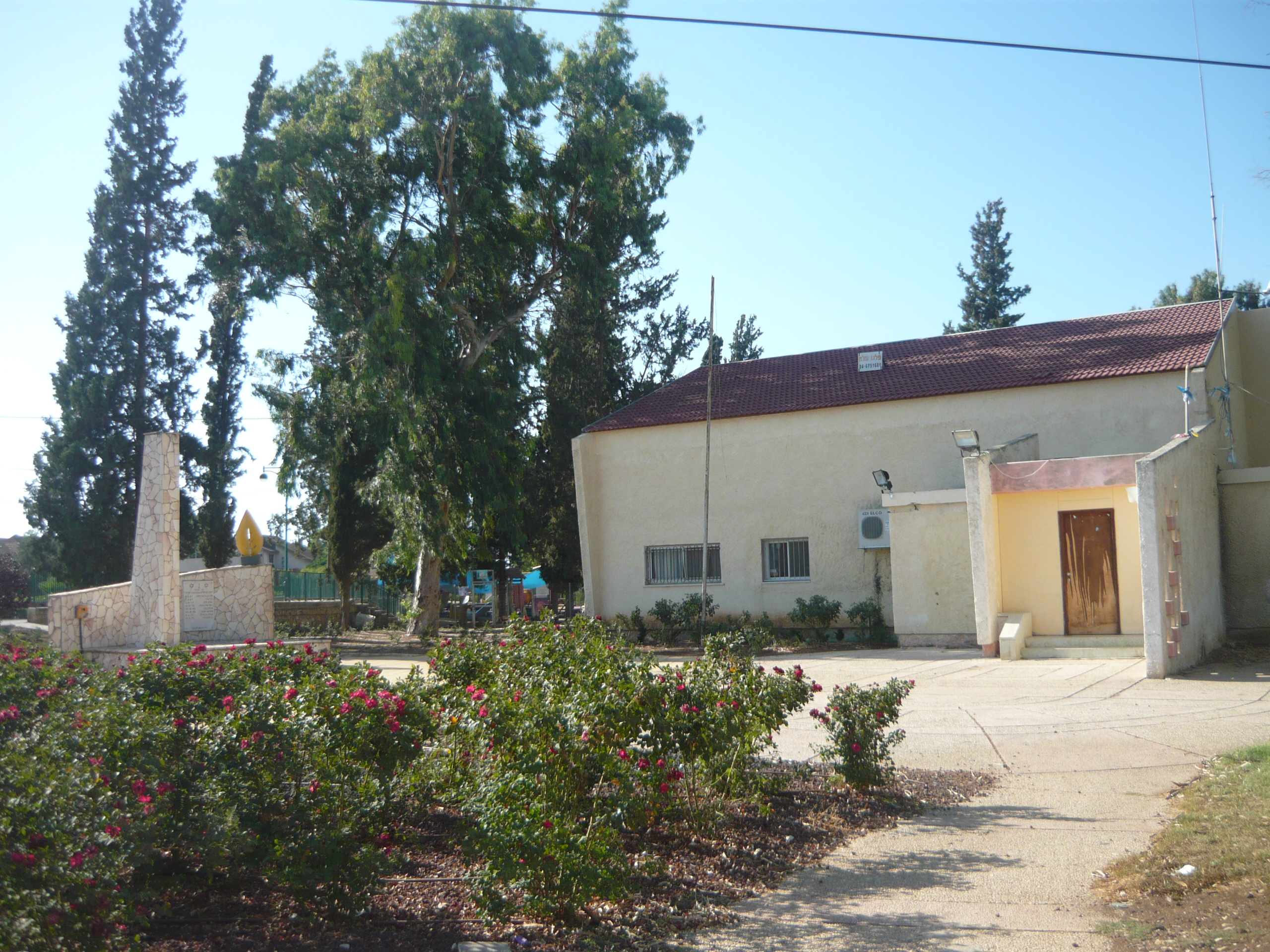

- Location within Jezreel Valley region of Israel
- Coordinates: 32°34′14″N 35°14′45″E
- Country: Israel
- District: Northern
- Subdistrict: Jezreel
- Council: Gilboa
- Affiliation: Moshavim Movement
- Founded: 1956
- Founder: Tunisian immigrants
- Population (2024): 691

Nir Yafe (Hebrew: נִיר יָפֶה) is a moshav in northern Israel. Located in the Ta'anakh region, it falls under the jurisdiction of Gilboa Regional Council. In 2024 it had a population of 691.

== History ==
It was founded in 1956 by immigrants to Israel from Tunisia as part of the program to settle the Ta'anakh region.
