= Barak, Israel =

Barak: בָּרָק (Hebrew)
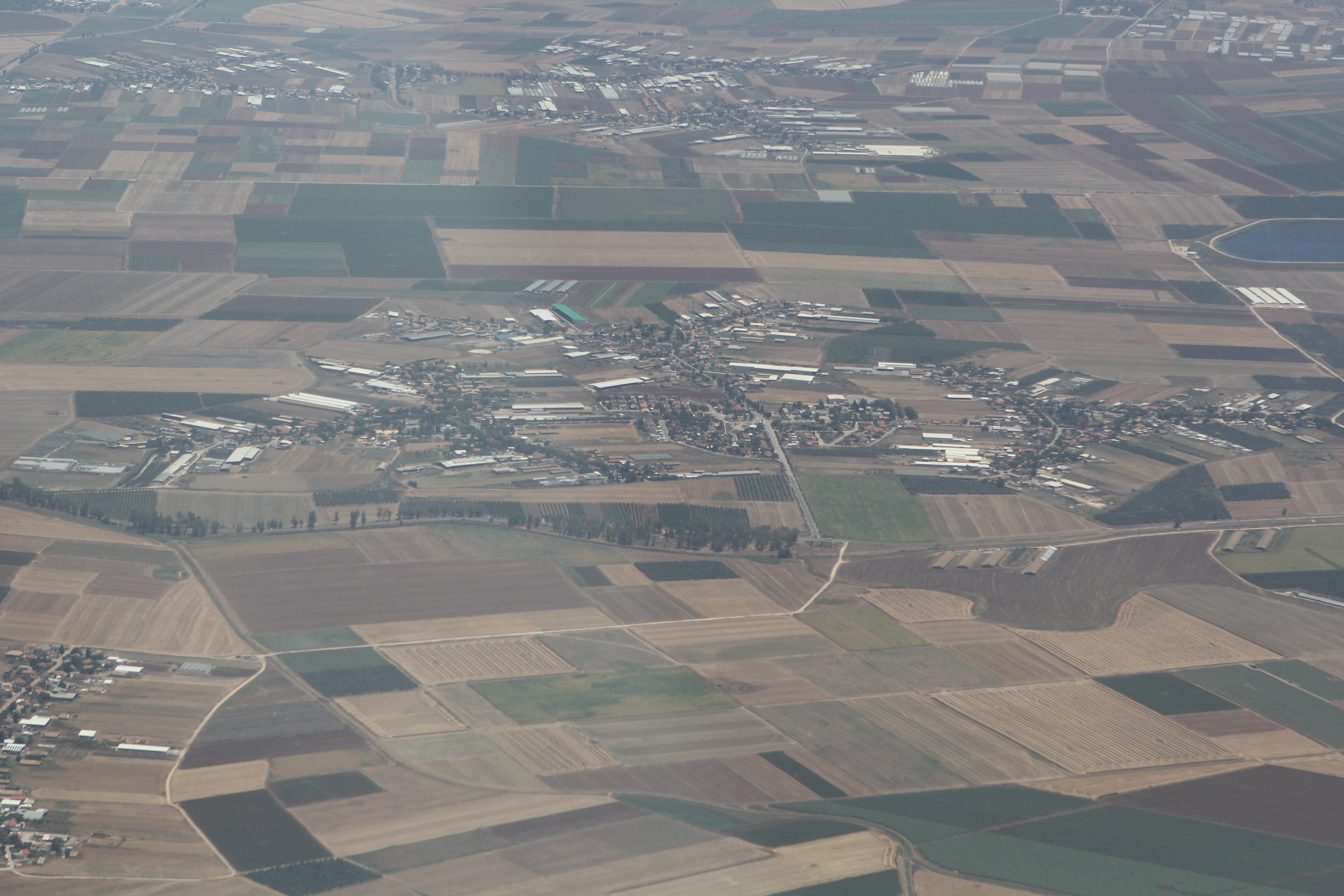
- Aerial view of Moshav Barak
- Etymology: Named after Barak
- Location within Jezreel Valley region of Israel
- Coordinates: 32°32′32″N 35°15′53″E
- Country: Israel
- District: Northern
- Subdistrict: Jezreel
- Council: Gilboa
- Affiliation: Moshavim Movement
- Founded: 1956
- Founder: Moroccan Jews
- Population (2024): 438

Barak (Hebrew: בָּרָק) is a moshav in northern Israel. Located in the Ta'anakh region, it falls under the jurisdiction of Gilboa Regional Council. As of 2024 it had a population of 438.

== History ==
The moshav was founded in 1956 by Moroccan Jewish immigrants as part of the program to settle the Ta'anakh region. The name "Barak" is derived from the character Barak in the Book of Judges (f.e. chapter 4, vers 6), who defeated the enemy king Sisera near the location of the moshav.

== Notable residents ==
- Joaquin Szuchman (born 1995), Israeli-Argentinian basketball player in the Israel Basketball Premier League
