= Avital (moshav) =

Avital: אֲבִיטַל (Hebrew)
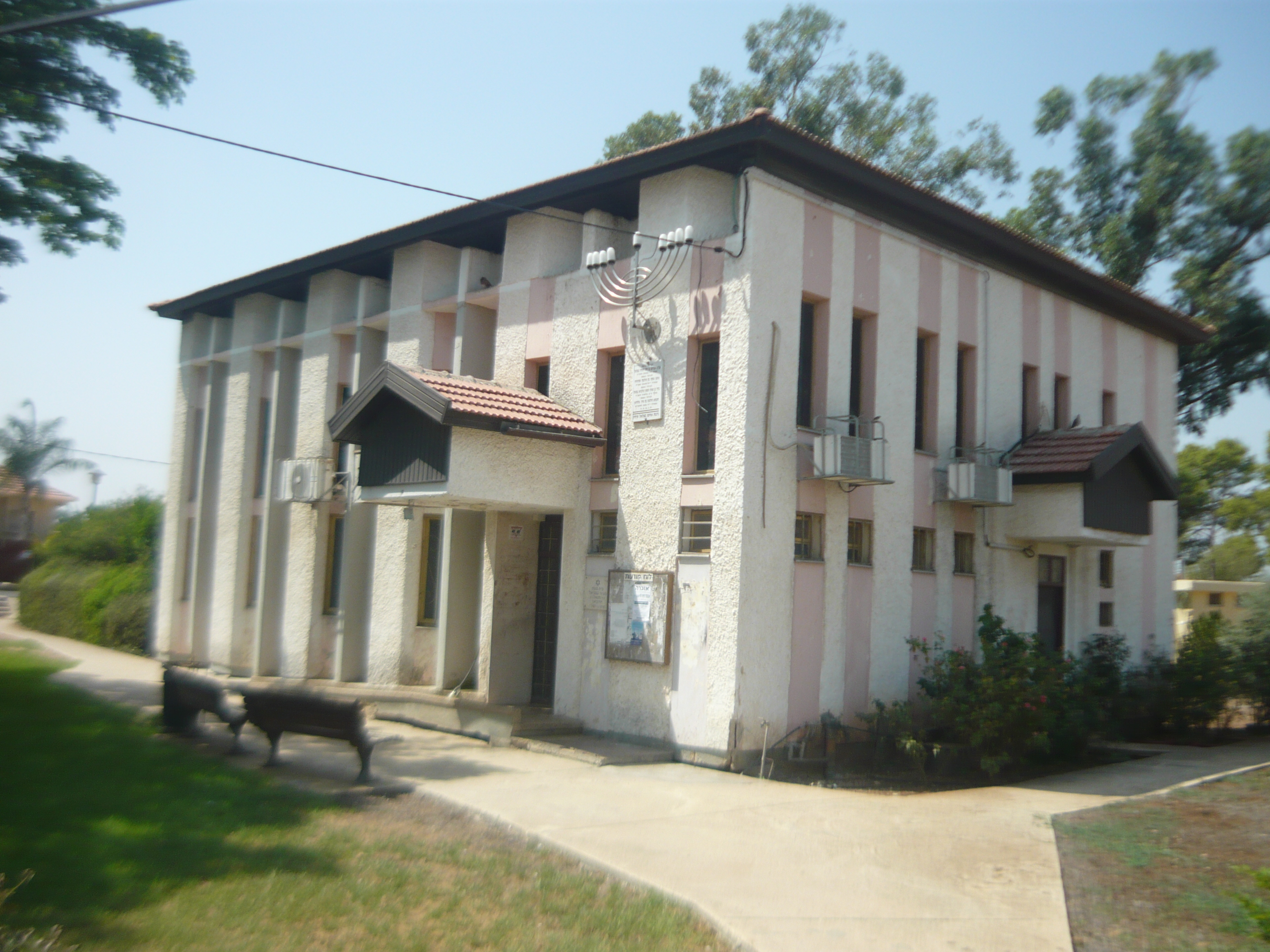
- Etymology: Named after Abital
- Location within Jezreel Valley region of Israel
- Coordinates: 32°33′29″N 35°18′21″E
- Country: Israel
- District: Northern
- Subdistrict: Jezreel
- Council: Gilboa
- Affiliation: Moshavim Movement
- Founded: 1953
- Founder: Iranian, Turkish and Kurdish Jews
- Population (2024): 637

Avital (Hebrew: אֲבִיטַל) is a moshav in northern Israel. Located ten kilometers south of Afula, it falls under the jurisdiction of Gilboa Regional Council. In 2024 its population was 637.

== History ==
The village was founded in 1953 by immigrants from Iran and Turkey as part of the Moshavim Movement.

Avital is located on land near the former Palestinian village of Zir'in.

The name is connected to King David, Avital was one of his wives (2 Samuel 3:4). But tal (eng. dew) reminds also of David's lament in this area: "O mountains of Gilboa, may You have no dew" (2 Samuel 1:21).

== See also ==
- Ta'anakh district
