= Danny Atar =

Israeli politician

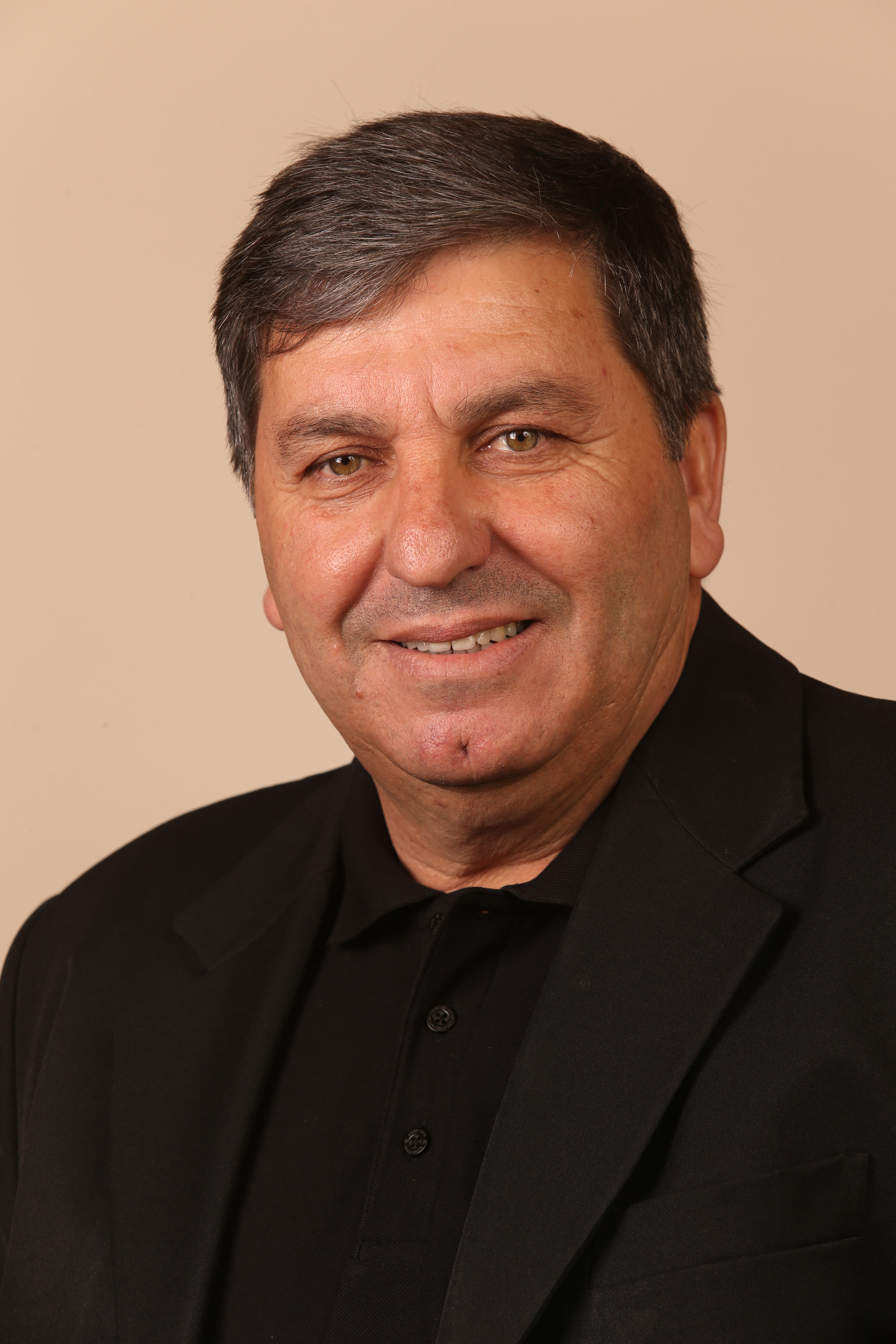
- Atar in 2015

Faction represented in the Knesset
- 2015: Zionist Union

Other roles
- 1994–2015: Head of Gilboa Regional Council
- 2015–2020: Head of the Jewish National Fund
- 2024–: Head of Gilboa Regional Council

Personal details
- Born: 5 January 1958 (age 68) Afula, Israel
- Education: University of Haifa

Daniel Atar (Hebrew: דניאל עטר; born 5 January 1958) is an Israeli politician. He was a member of the Knesset for the Zionist Union between 2015 and 2016.

== Biography ==
Atar was born in Afula, Israel, to Jewish parents who had immigrated from Morocco in 1956. During his IDF national service he served in the Golani Brigade. He fought in the 1982 Lebanon War. He continued to serve in the army reserves, becoming a lieutenant colonel.

In 1994 he was elected leader of Gilboa Regional Council. While serving in that role he ran for the interim leadership of the Labor Party in 2003, winning 21.9% of the vote. In 2009, Atar was detained and investigated along with five other municipal workers for fraudulently receiving goods and mismanagement of campaign funds.

He was placed 16th on the Labor Party list for the 2013 Knesset elections, a spot reserved for the agricultural sector, but did not become a Knesset member as the party won only 15 seats. Although he was next in line to replace Binyamin Ben-Eliezer following his retirement from politics, he gave up his seat for Raleb Majadele.

Prior to the 2015 elections he was placed 15th on the Zionist Union list, an alliance of Labor and Hatnuah. He was elected to the Knesset as the alliance won 24 seats.

In October 2015 Atar was elected head of the Jewish National Fund. He was replaced in the Knesset by Yael Cohen Paran, the head of the Green Movement. In 2020 Atar was accused of being party to the illegal spending of 100 million shekels to purchase lands in the West Bank without the permission of the Jewish National Fund Board.

== Personal life ==
Atar is married with three children and lives in Gan Ner. After years of enforcement efforts he was fined in 2020 and forced to return public lands adjacent to his home, which he had commandeered and used to construct an illegal private swimming pool.
