= Na'ura =

Arab town in northern Israel

Na'ura: נָעוּרָה (Hebrew); ناعورة (Arabic)
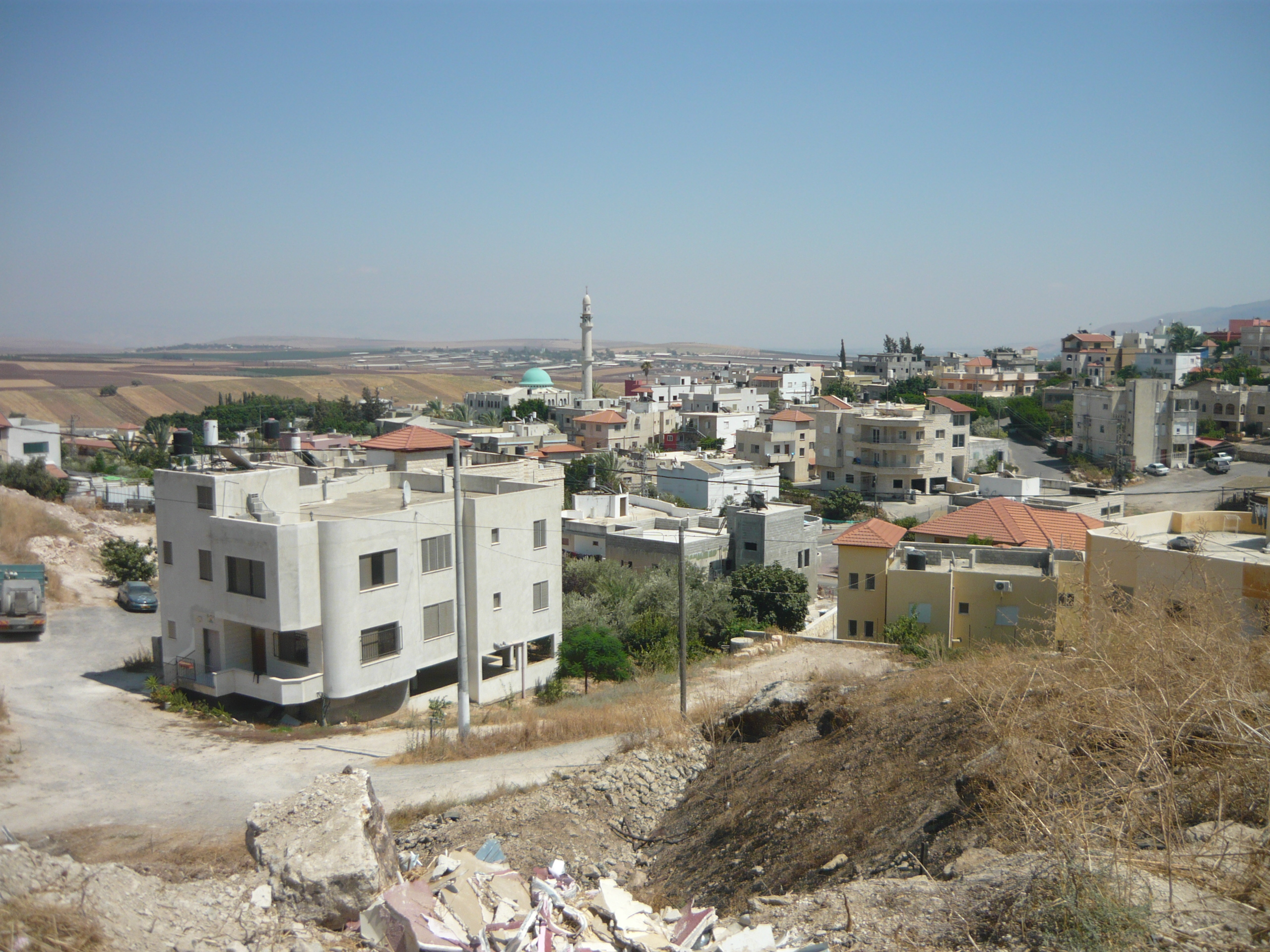
- Na'ura 2010

- Location within Northeast Israel Location within Israel
- Coordinates: 32°36′52″N 35°23′28″E
- Grid position: 187/224 PAL
- Country: Israel
- District: Northern
- Subdistrict: Jezreel
- Council: Gilboa
- Population (2024): 2,481

Na'ura (Arabic: ناعورة, Hebrew: נָעוּרָה) is an Arab village in northern Israel. Located to the east of Afula, it falls under the jurisdiction of the Gilboa Regional Council. In 2024 it had a population of 2,481.

== History ==
In 1517 Na'ura was incorporated into the Ottoman Empire with the rest of Palestine. During the 16th and 17th centuries, it belonged to the Turabay Emirate (1517–1683), which encompassed also the Jezreel Valley, Haifa, Jenin, Beit She'an Valley, northern Jabal Nablus, Bilad al-Ruha/Ramot Menashe, and the northern part of the Sharon plain.

The modern village was founded in the 18th century by members of the Zu'bi clan (Arabic: الزعبي) from the Hauran.

In 1870/1871 (1288 AH), an Ottoman census listed the village in the nahiya (sub-district) of Shafa al-Shamali.

== See also ==
- Arab localities in Israel

== Bibliography ==
- Barron, J. B., ed. (1923). Palestine: Report and General Abstracts of the Census of 1922. Government of Palestine.
- Conder, C.R.; Kitchener, H. H. (1882). The Survey of Western Palestine: Memoirs of the Topography, Orography, Hydrography, and Archaeology. Vol. 2. London: Committee of the Palestine Exploration Fund. (p. 85)
- Covello-Paran, Karen (2014-12-08). "Na'ura, Final Report" (126). Hadashot Arkheologiyot – Excavations and Surveys in Israel.
- Dalali-Amos, Edna (2007-09-11). "Na'ura, Final Report" (119). Hadashot Arkheologiyot – Excavations and Surveys in Israel.
- Dalali-Amos, Edna (2011-11-28). "Na'ura, Final Report" (123). Hadashot Arkheologiyot – Excavations and Surveys in Israel.
- Dalali-Amos, Edna (2018-03-29). "Na'ura, Final Report" (130). Hadashot Arkheologiyot – Excavations and Surveys in Israel.
- Dauphin, C. (1998). La Palestine byzantine, Peuplement et Populations. BAR International Series 726 (in French). Vol. III : Catalogue. Oxford: Archeopress. ISBN 0-860549-05-4. (p. 736)
- Department of Statistics (1945). Village Statistics, April, 1945. Government of Palestine.
- Guérin, V. (1880). Description Géographique Historique et Archéologique de la Palestine (in French). Vol. 3: Galilee, pt. 1. Paris: L'Imprimerie Nationale. (p. 124)
- Hadawi, S. (1970). Village Statistics of 1945: A Classification of Land and Area ownership in Palestine. Palestine Liberation Organization Research Center.
- Hartal, Moshe (2010-09-07). "Na'ura, Final Report" (122). Hadashot Arkheologiyot – Excavations and Surveys in Israel.
- Hütteroth, W.-D.; Abdulfattah, K. (1977). Historical Geography of Palestine, Transjordan and Southern Syria in the Late 16th Century. Erlanger Geographische Arbeiten, Sonderband 5. Erlangen, Germany: Vorstand der Fränkischen Geographischen Gesellschaft. ISBN 3-920405-41-2. (p. 157)
- Karmon, Y. (1960). "An Analysis of Jacotin's Map of Palestine" (PDF). Israel Exploration Journal. 10 (3, 4): 155–173, 244–253. Archived from the original (PDF) on 2019-12-22. (p. 169 Archived 2019-12-22 at the Wayback Machine)
- Mills, E., ed. (1932). Census of Palestine 1931. Population of Villages, Towns and Administrative Areas. Jerusalem: Government of Palestine.
- Mokary, Abdalla (2016-03-30). "Na'ura, Final Report" (128). Hadashot Arkheologiyot – Excavations and Surveys in Israel.
- Palmer, E. H. (1881). The Survey of Western Palestine: Arabic and English Name Lists Collected During the Survey by Lieutenants Conder and Kitchener, R. E. Transliterated and Explained by E.H. Palmer. Committee of the Palestine Exploration Fund. (p. 166)
- Robinson, E.; Smith, E. (1856). Later Biblical Researches in Palestine and adjacent regions: A Journal of Travels in the year 1852. London: John Murray. (Robinson and Smith, 1856, p. 338)
