= Dvora, Israel =

Dvora: דְּבוֹרָה (Hebrew)
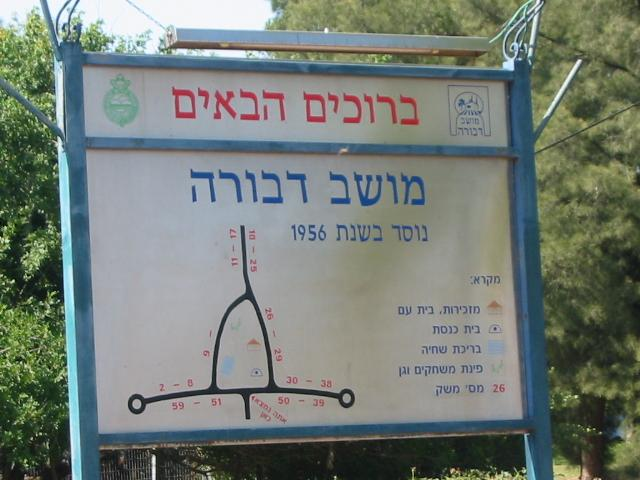
- Entrance sign
- Etymology: Named after Deborah
- Location within Jezreel Valley region of Israel Location within Israel
- Coordinates: 32°33′12″N 35°15′49″E
- Country: Israel
- District: Northern
- Subdistrict: Jezreel
- Council: Gilboa
- Founder: Moroccan Jews from Marrakesh
- Population (2024): 339

Devorah (Hebrew: דְּבוֹרָה) is a moshav in northern Israel. Located in the Ta'anakh region, near Afula, it falls under the jurisdiction of Gilboa Regional Council. As of 2024 it had a population of 339.

== History ==
The village was founded in 1956 by immigrants from Morocco as part of a program to populate the Ta'anakh region. It is named after the prophet Devorah (Deborah) (Judges 4:4), who defeated Sisera in the Book of Judges.
