= Ta'anakh =

Region in Israel

Coordinates: 32°33′12.49″N 35°16′15.31″E

The Ta'anakh region (Hebrew: חבל תענך, Hevel Ta'anakh), also known as Ta'anachim (Hebrew: תענכים), is an area to the south of Israel's Jezreel Valley and east of the Wadi Ara region. The area is named after the biblical city (Joshua 17:11), located just across the Green Line in the northwest West Bank. In the 1950s, the area was settled by immigrants from Morocco, Tunisia, Kurdistan, and Poland.

Most or all of this region is located in the Gilboa Regional Council.

== List of villages and community centers ==
- Adirim
- Avital
- Barak
- Dvora
- Gadish
- Meitav
- Merkaz Hever
- Merkaz Yael
- Mlea
- Nir Yafeh
- Prazon
- Ram-On

Six villages out of this list got names from the biblical story of Dvora's battle (Judges, chap 4–5): Adirim, Barak, Dvora, (Merkaz) Hever, Prazon and (Merkaz) Yael.

== See also ==
- Ti'inik
