= Yotam Tepper =

Israeli archaeologist

Yotam Tepper (Hebrew: יותם טפר; born c. 1987) is an Israeli archaeologist who discovered the Megiddo church complex, the oldest Christian house of worship ever discovered, under the modern Megiddo prison. Dated to around 230, it is believed to be the earliest Christian site of worship ever discovered. Countless Roman relics were discovered alongside the church.
