= Jezreel Subdistrict =

Jezreel Subdistrict נפת יזרעאל قضاء يزرعئيل
- Subdistrict
- Northern District in blue, with Jezreel Subdistrict in dark blue
- Interactive map of Jezreel Subdistrict
- Country: Israel
- District: Northern

Area
  - Total: 1,193 km^{2} (461 sq mi)

Population (2024)
  - Total: 571,398

Ethnicity
  - Jews and others: 45.7%
  - Arabs: 53.2%

The Jezreel Subdistrict is one of Israel's sub-districts in Northern District.

== History ==
The subdistrict was created by the merger of the two Mandatory Palestine subdistricts of Beisan (Beit Shan) and Nazareth.

== Demographics ==
Historical population
Year	Pop.	±%
1972	162,300	—
1983	225,300	+38.8%
1995	326,100	+44.7%
2008	444,700	+36.4%
2022	547,481	+23.1%
2024	571,398	+4.4%

== Administrative local authorities ==
Cities	Local Councils	Regional Councils
Afula; Bet She'an; Migdal HaEmek; Nazareth; Nof HaGalil; Yokneam	Basmat Tab'un; Bu'eine Nujeidat; Daburiyya; Ein Mahil; Iksal; Ilut; Ka'abiyye-Tabbash-Hajajre; Kafr Kanna; Mashhad; Ramat Yishai; Reineh; Shibli-Umm al-Ghanam; Tur'an; Yafa an-Naseriyye; Zarzir	al-Batuf (part); Bustan al-Marj; Gilboa; Jezreel Valley; Lower Galilee (part); Megiddo; Valley of Springs (formerly Beit She'an Valley)

== Voting Patterns ==
In the 2022 election, 41.7 percent of voters in the subdistrict voted for the Arab parties, while 30.5 percent voted for the parties of the right-wing coalition led by Benjamin Netanyahu and 27.8 percent voted for the parties of the center-left coalition led by Yair Lapid.

In the 2026 election, 51 percent of voters in the subdistrict voted for the Arab parties, while 23.4 percent voted for the parties of the center-left coalition led by Gadi Eisenkot and 22.6 percent voted for the parties of the right-wing coalition led by Benjamin Netanyahu. An additional 1.5 percent voted for the Reservists, and 1.1 percent voted for Amcha Yisrael. Voter turnout increased 39 percent from the 2022 election.

== Natural Regions ==
Districts, Subdistricts and Natural Regions of the State of Israel, 2018

- 231 Bet She’an Valley
  - Population (2024): 36,881
  - Largest city: Beit She'an
- 232 Harod Valley
  - Population (2024): 12,631
  - Largest city: Gan Ner
- 233 Kokhav Plateau
  - Population (2024): 15,262
  - Largest city: Kafr Misr
- 234 Yizre’el Valley
  - Population (2024): 103,799
  - Largest city: Afula
- 235 Yoqne'am
  - Population (2024): 39,268
  - Largest city: Yokneam Illit
- 236 Menashe Plateau
  - Population (2024): 6.701
  - Largest city: Ramot Menashe
- 237 Nazareth-Tir'an Mountains
  - Population (2024): 356,856
  - Largest city: Nazareth
