= Nazareth-Tir'an Mountains Natural Region =

Coordinates: 32°42′07″N 35°18′12″E

- Natural Region
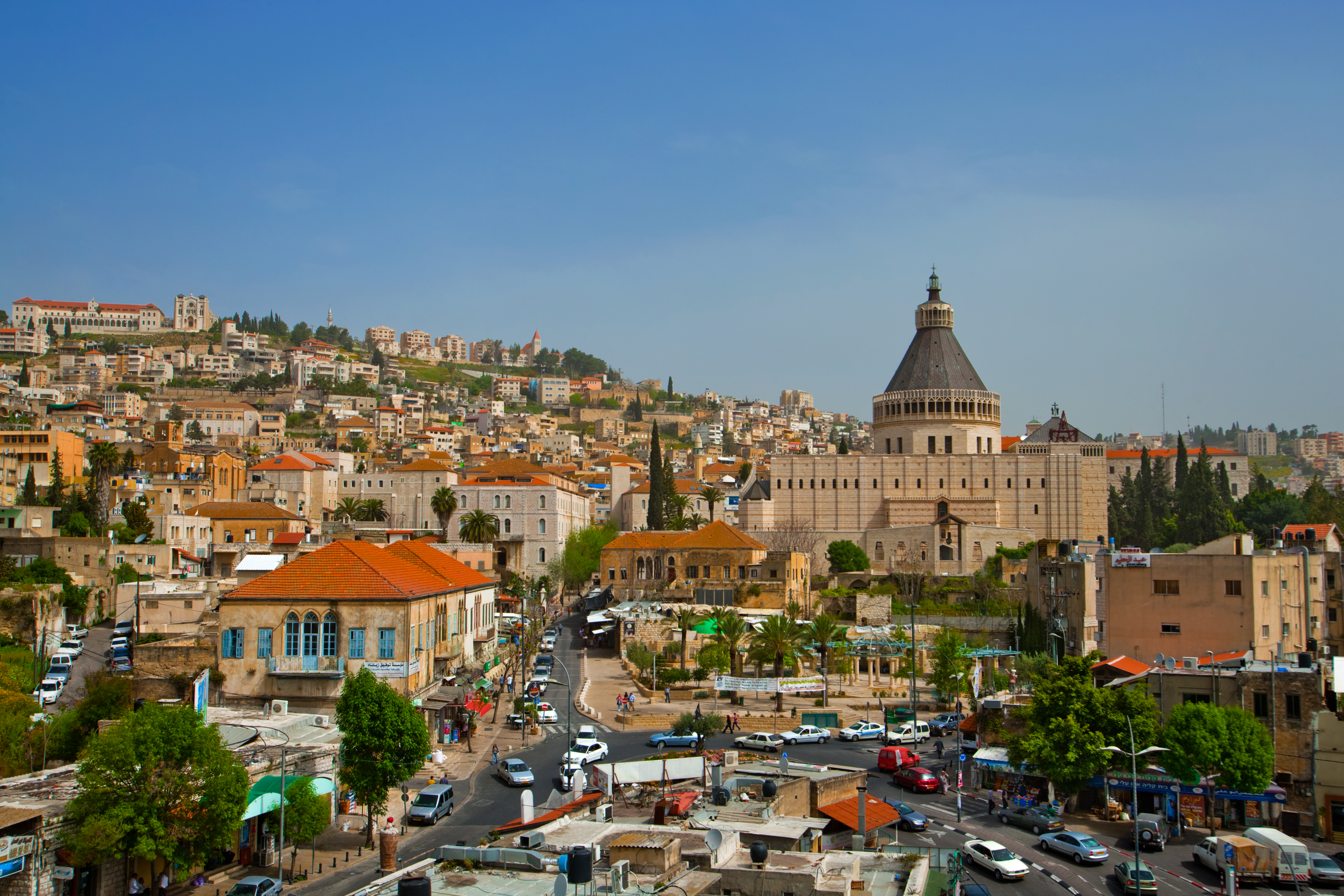
- Panorama of Nazareth
- Interactive map of Nazareth-Tir'an Mountains Natural Region
- Country: Israel
- District: Northern
- Subdistrict: Jezreel
- Largest City: Nazareth

Area
  - Total: 256 km^{2} (99 sq mi)

Population (2024)
  - Total: 356,856

Ethnicity
  - Jews and others: 20.7%
  - Arabs: 78.9%

The Nazareth-Tir'an Mountains Natural Region is a natural region in the Jezreel Subdistrict, in the Northern District of Israel. Nazareth is the largest city in the natural region.

== Geography ==
Districts, Subdistricts and Natural Regions of the State of Israel, 2018

The natural region consists of a mountainous area north of the Jezreel Valley, and contains the entire Nazareth metropolitan area as well as several nearby valleys. It has an area of 256 km^{2}. It contains Mount Tabor, the mountain where many Christians believe the Transfiguration of Jesus occurred. The natural region by itself contains a majority of the population of the Jezreel Subdistrict, and is also the most populous natural region in the entire Northern District. The Nazareth metropolitan area contains 73 percent of the natural region's population. It contains portions of the al-Batuf, Jezreel Valley, and Lower Galilee regional councils.

== Demographics ==
The natural region has a large Arab majority of 79 percent. 21 percent of the population is Jewish, concentrated in Nof HaGalil, Migdal HaEmek, and scattered kibbutzim in the area. Roughly 14 percent of Israel's Arab population lives in the natural region.

Historical population
Year	Pop.	±%
1972	95,600	—
1983	143,500	+50.1%
1995	220,000	+53.3%
2008	297,030	+35.0%
2022	344,365	+15.9%
2024	356,856	+3.6%

== Administrative local authorities ==
Cities	Local Councils	Villages
Migdal HaEmek; Nazareth; Nof HaGalil	Basmat Tab'un; Bu'eine Nujeidat; Daburiyya; Ein Mahil; Iksal; Ilut; Ka'abiyye-Tabbash-Hajajre; Kafr Kanna; Mashhad; Reineh; Shibli-Umm al-Ghanam; Tur'an; Yafa an-Naseriyye; Zarzir	al-Batuf: Rumat Heib; Rumana; Uzeir; Jezreel Valley: Adi; Alon HaGalil; Alonei Abba; Bethlehem of Galilee; Givat Ela; Hanaton; Harduf; HaSolelim; Hosha'aya; Kfar HaHoresh; Manshiyet Zabda; Suweid Hamira; Shimshit; Timrat; Tzippori; Lower Galilee: Beit Rimon; Mitzpe Netofa

== Voting Patterns ==
In the 2022 election, 67 percent of voters in the natural region voted for the Arab parties, while 17 percent voted for the parties of the right-wing coalition led by Benjamin Netanyahu and 16 percent voted for the parties of the center-left coalition led by Yair Lapid.

In the 2026 election, 75 percent of voters in the natural region voted for the Arab parties, while 13 percent voted for the parties of the center-left coalition led by Gadi Eisenkot and 10 percent voted for the parties of the right-wing coalition led by Benjamin Netanyahu. An additional 0.7 percent voted for the Reservists, and 0.6 percent voted for Amcha Yisrael. Voter turnout increased 51 percent from the 2022 election.
