= Yizre'el Valley Natural Region =

Coordinates: 32°36′23″N 35°17′17″E

- Natural Region
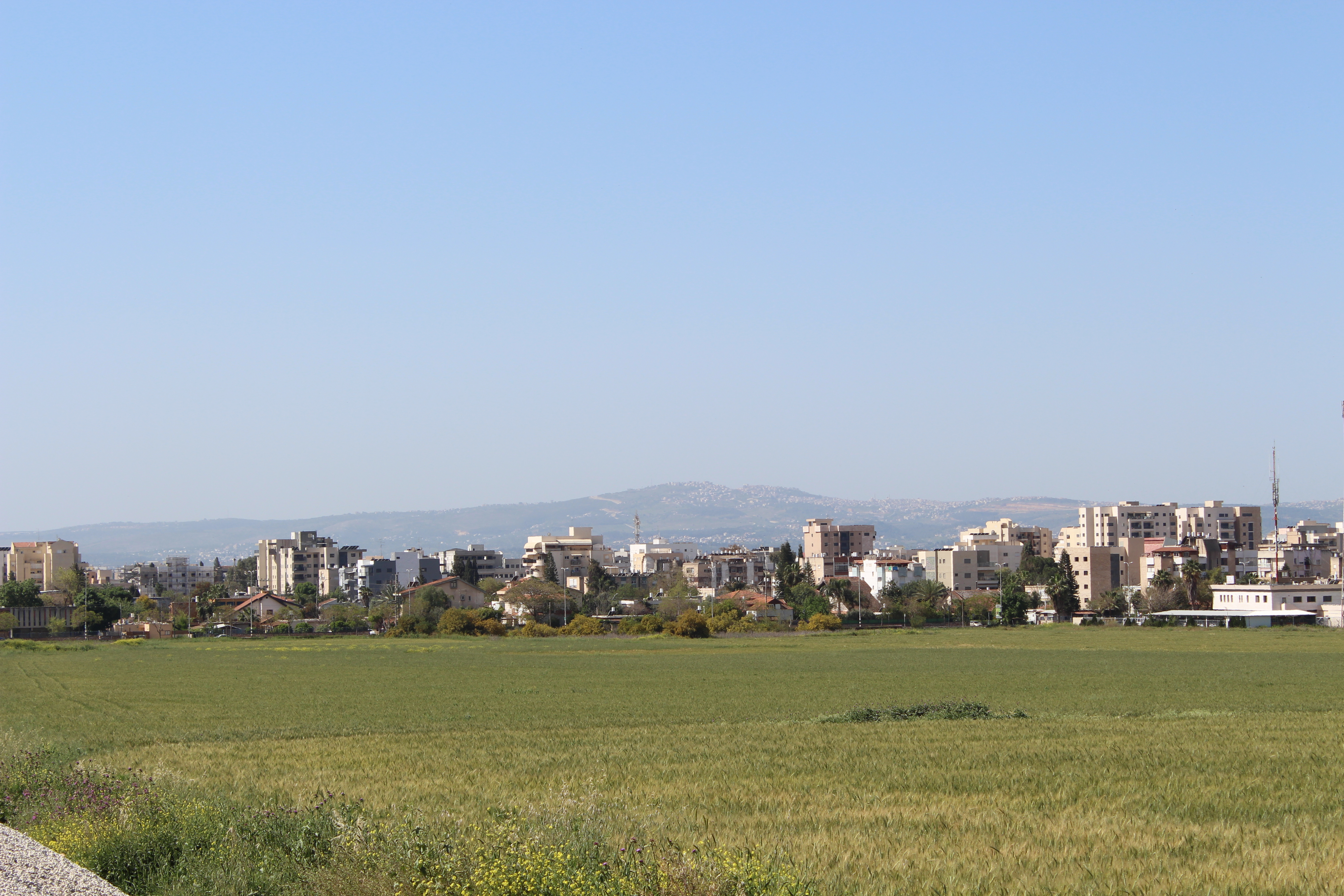
- View of Afula
- Interactive map of Yizre'el Valley Natural Region
- Country: Israel
- District: Northern
- Subdistrict: Jezreel
- Largest City: Afula

Area
  - Total: 297 km^{2} (115 sq mi)

Population (2024)
  - Total: 103,779

Ethnicity
  - Jews and others: 89.0%
  - Arabs: 8.9%

The Yizre'el Valley Natural Region or Jezreel Valley Natural Region is a natural region in the Jezreel Subdistrict, in the Northern District of Israel. Afula is the largest city in the natural region.

== Geography ==
Districts, Subdistricts and Natural Regions of the State of Israel, 2018

The natural region contains most of the Jezreel Valley, a wide, low agricultural valley drained by the Kishon River. It is adjacent to the West Bank. It has an area of 297 km^{2}. The largest city is Afula, containing 64 percent of the natural region's population. There are no other towns in the natural region with more than 5,000 inhabitants. It contains portions of the Bustan al-Marj, Gilboa, Jezreel Valley, and Megiddo regional councils.

== Demographics ==
Jews constitute a large majority of the population, at 89 percent. 9 percent of the population is Arab, concentrated in the towns of Muqeible, Sulam, and Ed-Dahi.

Historical population
Year	Pop.	±%
1972	30,000	—
1983	36,200	+20.7%
1995	49,400	+36.5%
2008	63,980	+29.5%
2022	96,503	+50.8%
2024	103,799	+7.6%

== Administrative local authorities ==
Cities	Local Councils	Villages
Afula	[None]	Bustan al-Marj; Sulam; ed-Dahi; Gilboa: Adirim; Avital; Barak; Dvora; Gadish; Magen Sha'ul; Mele'a; Meitav; Merkaz Hever; Merkaz Ya'el; Muqeible; Nir Yafe; Omen; Prazon; Ram-On; Yizre'el; Jezreel Valley: Ahuzat Barak; Balfouria; Dovrat; Gevat; Ginegar; HaYogev; Kfar Baruch; Kfar Gid'on; Merhavia (kibbutz); Merhavia (moshav); Mizra; Nahalal; Ramat David; Sarid; Tel Adashim; Yifat; Megiddo: Givat Oz; Megiddo; Midrach Oz; Mishmar HaEmek

== Voting Patterns ==
In the 2022 election, 55 percent of voters in the natural region voted for the parties of the right-wing coalition led by Benjamin Netanyahu, while 40 percent voted for the parties of the center-left coalition led by Yair Lapid and 5 percent voted for the Arab parties.

In the 2026 election, 49 percent of voters in the natural region voted for the parties of the right-wing coalition led by Benjamin Netanyahu, while 38 percent voted for the parties of the center-left coalition led by Gadi Eisenkot and 8 percent voted for the Arab parties. An additional 2.9 percent voted for the Reservists, and 1.8 percent voted for Amcha Yisrael. Voter turnout increased 24 percent from the 2022 election.
