= Highway 79 (Israel) =

Road in Israel

Coordinates: 32°47′14″N 35°12′05″E

Highway 79
- כביש 79
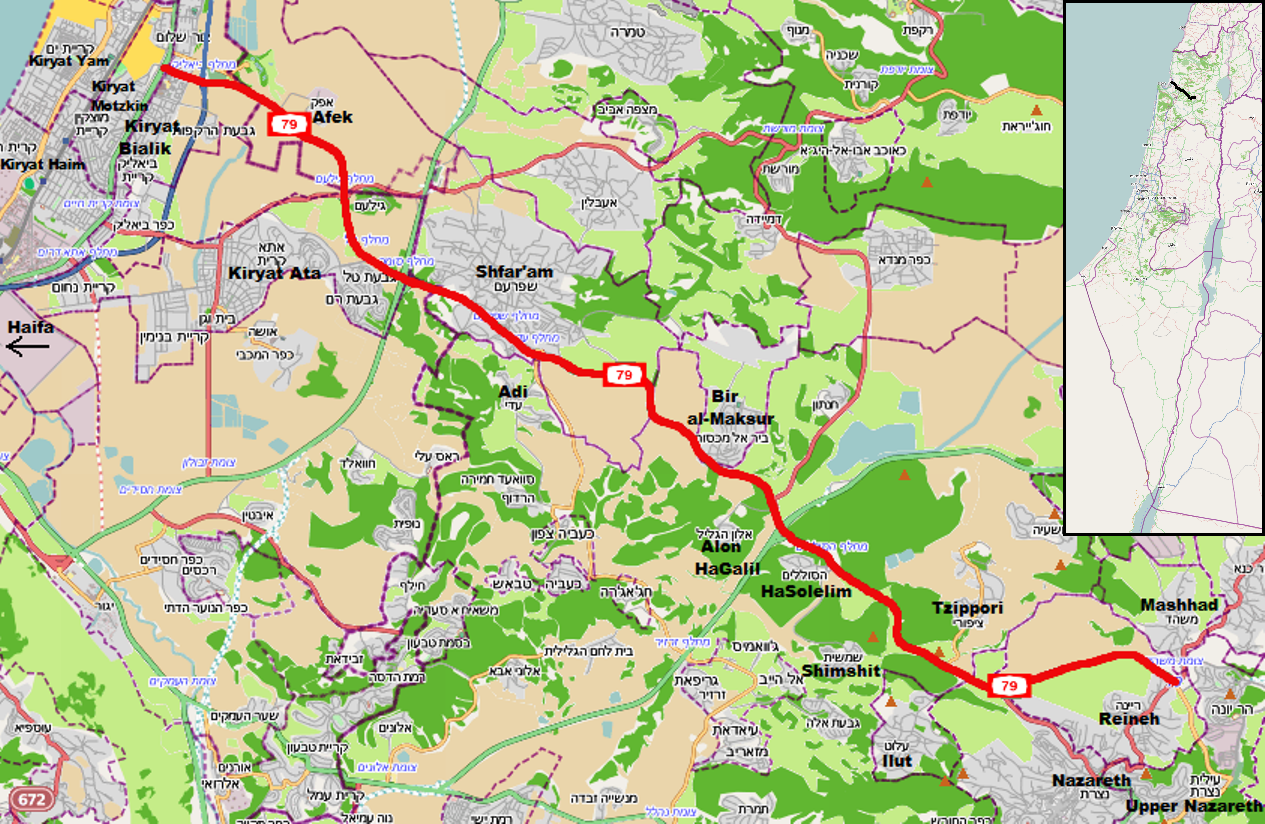

Route information
- Length: 29 km (18 mi)

Major junctions
- west end: Afek Junction
- Bialik Interchange; Gil'am Interchange; Somekh Interchange; Shfar'am Interchange; HaMovil Junction; Avihu Junction
- east end: Mashhad Interchange

Location
- Country: Israel
- Major cities: Kiryat Bialik, Kiryat Ata, Shfar'am, Nazareth

Highway system
- Roads in Israel; Highways
← Highway 77	→ Highway 80

Highway 79 is an east-west highway in northern Israel. It crosses the Zevulun Valley and the western Lower Galilee. The road leads from Kiryat Bialik to Mashhad north of Nazareth. It is 27 km long.

== Development ==
On January 19, 2009, a tender was published to widen 8.5 km of the highway next to HaMovil Junction to 2 lanes per direction, including the construction of several interchanges, at the cost of NIS 500 million.

In the future, a tram-train connecting Haifa and Nazareth is planned to be built in the highway's median along most of the highway's route.

== Junctions & Interchanges (east to west) ==
km	Name	Type	Meaning	Location	Road(s) Crossed
0	צומת עין אפק (Afek Junction)		Afek Spring	Kiryat Bialik	Highway 4 (Derech Acco)
0.2				Kiryat Bialik	HaMakabim St.
0.5	eastbound only			Kiryat Bialik	Etzel St.
0.9	מחלף ביאליק (Bialik Interchange)		Named after Hayim Nahman Bialik	Kiryat Bialik	Highway 22 (Bay Highway)
2.8	צומת אפק (Afeq Junction)		Named after biblical location	Afek	entrance road
5.5	מחלף גילעם (Gil'am Interchange)		Named after location of former Jewish refugee camp	Kiryat Ata	Route 781
6.7	מחלף תל (Tal Interchange)		Named after neighborhood of Kiryat Ata; Dew	Kiryat Ata	Toulouse-Lautrec St.
7.9	מחלף סומך (Somekh Interchange)		named for Rabbi ben Baba (buried nearby) who performed ordinations	Kiryat Ata, Shfar'am	Highway 70 Highway 6
10.5	מחלף שפרעם (Shfar'am Interchange)		several possible etymologies	Shfar'am	Mahmud Darwish St.
11.3	מחלף עדי (Adi Interchange)		Ornament	Shfar'am, Adi	Road 310, local road
13	מחלף שפרעם מזרח (Shfar'am Mizrah Interchange)		Shfar'am East	Shfar'am	Road 100
15.8	מחלף ביר אל-מכסור (Bir al-Maksur Interchange)		Broken Well	Bir al-Maksur	local road
18.3	צומת יפתחאל (Yiftah'el Junction)		named after archeological site God will open	Alon HaGalil	local road, Route 784
18.7	מחלף המוביל (HaMovil Interchange)		Aqueduct	HaSolelim	Highway 77
20	מחלף הסוללים (HaSolelim Interchange)		the road builders	HaSolelim, Shimshit	local road
23.8	צומת ציפורי (Tzippori Junction)		ult. named after ancient location	Sepphoris	Road 7926
24.3	צומת עילוט (Ilut Junction); Eliminated 2020		ult. Lot's Well	Ilut	Seforiya St.
25.2	צומת אביהוא (Avihu Junction)		my father is he	Nazareth	Route 700; Road 7928 (Seforiya St.)
29.2	צומת משהד (Mashhad Junction)		grave of a holy man (referring to Jonah)	Mashhad, Reineh, Upper Nazareth	Route 754; Road 6400

== Places of interest on Highway 79 ==
- Tel Afek
- Monument to the Bedouin soldier
- Hasolelim forest nature reserve
- Sepphoris (ancient village)

== See also ==
- List of highways in Israel
- Zevulun Valley
- Lower Galilee
