= Yokneam Natural Region =

Coordinates: 32°39′34″N 35°06′36″E

- Natural Region
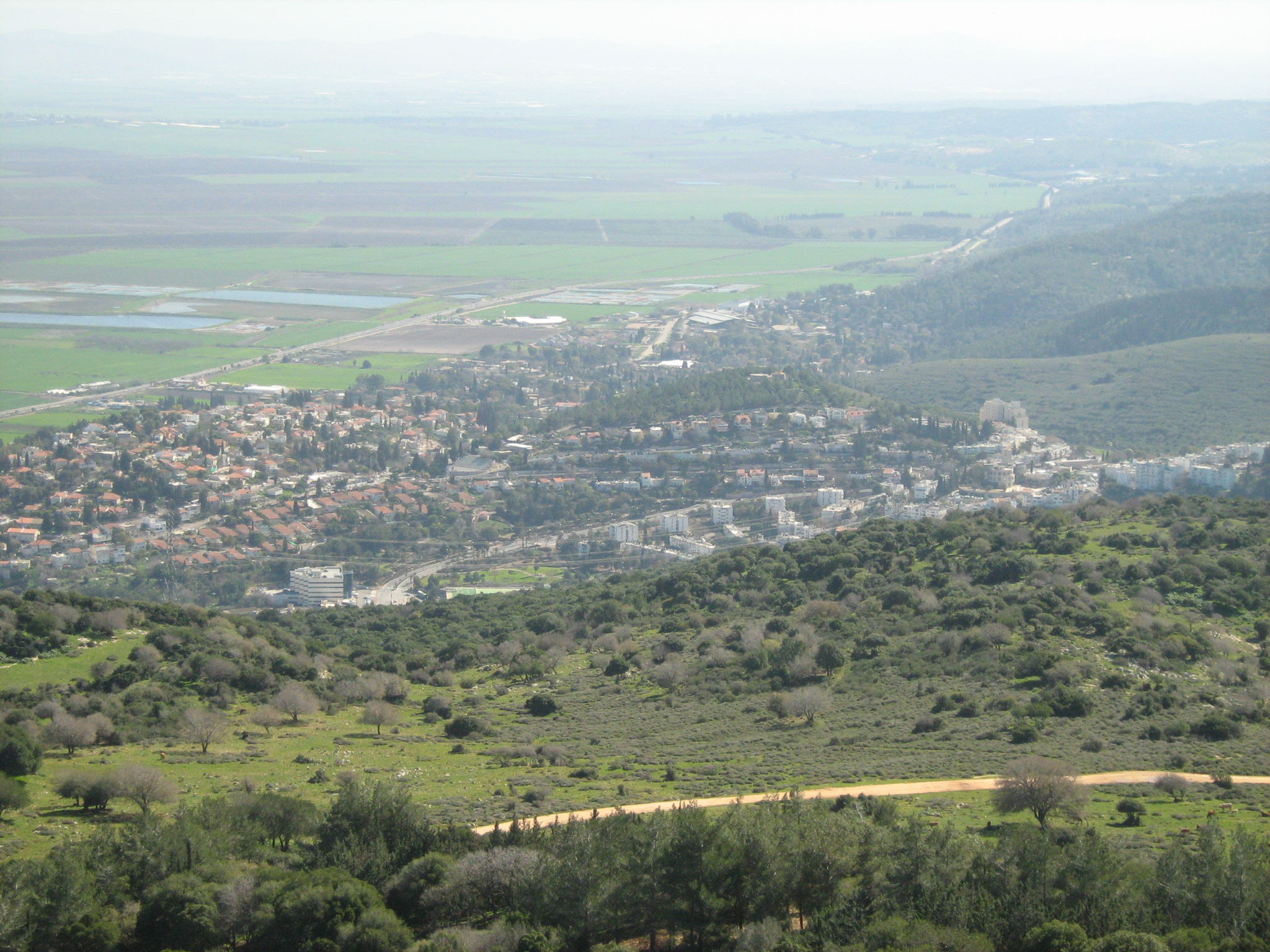
- View of Yokneam Illit
- Interactive map of Yokneam Natural Region
- Country: Israel
- District: Northern
- Subdistrict: Jezreel
- Largest City: Yokneam Illit

Area
  - Total: 62 km^{2} (24 sq mi)

Population (2024)
  - Total: 39,268

Ethnicity
  - Jews and others: 98.4%
  - Arabs: 0.2%

The Yokneam Natural Region or Yoqneam Natural Region is a natural region in the Jezreel Subdistrict, in the Northern District of Israel. Yokneam Illit is the largest town in the natural region.

== Geography ==
Districts, Subdistricts and Natural Regions of the State of Israel, 2018

The natural region is located southeast of Haifa, spanning the western Jezreel Valley and foothills of Mount Carmel. It has an area of 62 km^{2}. The largest city in the natural region is Yokneam Illit, which contains 63 percent of the natural region's population. The only other town in the natural region with more than 5,000 people is Ramat Yishai. It contains portions of the Jezreel Valley and Megiddo regional councils.

== Demographics ==
The vast majority of residents of the Yokneam Natural Region are Jews. There are no Arab towns in the region.

Historical population
| Year | Pop. | ±% |
|---|---|---|
| 1972 | 8,000 | — |
| 1983 | 10,400 | +30.0% |
| 1995 | 16,900 | +62.5% |
| 2008 | 30,390 | +79.8% |
| 2022 | 37,942 | +24.9% |
| 2024 | 39,268 | +3.5% |

== Administrative local authorities ==
| Cities | Local Councils | Villages |
|---|---|---|
| Yokneam Illit | Ramat Yishai | Jezreel Valley: Alonim; Beit She'arim; Beit Zaid; Kfar Yehoshua; Sde Ya'akov; Megiddo: HaZorea; Yokneam Moshava |

== Voting Patterns ==
In the 2022 election, 57 percent of voters in the natural region voted for the parties of the center-left coalition led by Yair Lapid, while 40 percent voted for the parties of the right-wing coalition led by Benjamin Netanyahu and 0.2 percent voted for the Arab parties.

In the 2026 election, 58 percent of voters in the natural region voted for the parties of the center-left coalition led by Gadi Eisenkot, while 35 percent voted for the parties of the right-wing coalition led by Benjamin Netanyahu and 0.2 percent voted for the Arab parties. An additional 4 percent voted for the Reservists, and 2.4 percent voted for Amcha Yisrael. Voter turnout increased 17 percent from the 2022 election.
