= Kvutzat Alon =

Kvutzat Alon: קבוצת אלון (Hebrew)
- Country: Israel
- District: Northern
- Council: Jezreel Valley Regional Council
- Affiliation: Kibbutz Movement
- Founded: August 1948
- Founder: Polish Jews
- Population (2024): 781

Kvutzat Alon (Hebrew: קְבוּצַת אַלּוֹן) is an Israeli kibbutz. Located in the Jezreel Valley in northern Israel, it falls under the jurisdiction of the Jezreel Valley Regional Council. As of 2022, it had a population of 781.

== History ==
Kvutzat Alon was founded in August 1948 as a kvutza, by a group of Polish Jews from Łódź, who immigrated to Israel, many of whom were Holocaust survivors. Kvutzat Alon was established as part of the Kibbutz movement, which aimed to establish Jewish agricultural communities in a communal way of life, sharing all material goods. Kvutzat Alon is based on the principles of socialism, agriculture, and self-sufficiency.

== Etymology ==
The name "Alon" in Hebrew translates to "oak tree", symbolizing renewal and continuity. The choice of this name stemmed from the oak tree's tall and strong characteristics, that serve as a source of strength and support for its members, and provides shelter for people around it.

The name "Alon", in the context of the kibbutz, is also used as a reference to Jews expelled from Gush Etzion by the Jordanian Arab Legion in 1948 following the Kfar Etzion massacre.

== Economy ==
The economy of Kvutzat Alon is primarily based on agriculture. The community operates its own businesses, including a dairy farm, a poultry farm, and a greenhouse complex. The kibbutz's fields grow crops such as oranges, grapefruits, avocados, olives, and vegetables like tomatoes, cucumbers, and bell peppers. The kibbutz uses both traditional farming methods and modern agricultural technologies. Some residents work in education and healthcare.
