= Highway 80 (Israel) =

Highway in Israel

Coordinates: 31°13′45″N 35°06′22″E

Highway 80
- כביש 80
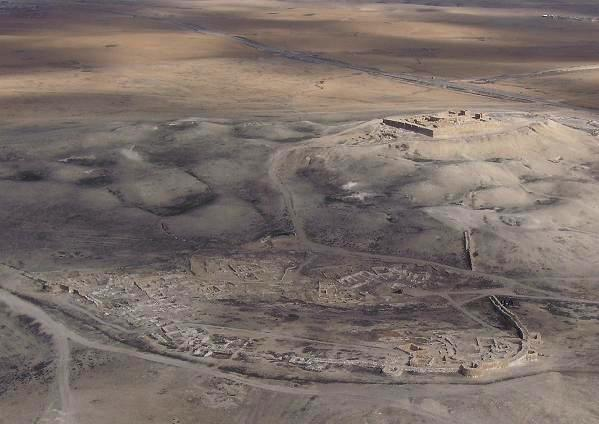
- Tel Arad and Highway 80

Route information
- Length: 34 km (21 mi)

Major junctions
- South end: Ar'ara BaNegev Junction
- North end: Amasa Junction

Location
- Country: Israel

Highway system
- Roads in Israel; Highways
← Highway 79	→ Highway 85

Highway 80 is a north-south highway in southern Israel, east of Beersheba. It connects Ar'arat an-Naqab in the south to Metzadot Yehuda in the north. It is 34 km long.

== Junctions (South to North) ==
District	Location	km	mi	Name	Destinations	Notes
Southern	Ar'ara BaNegev	0	0.0	צומת ערערה בנגב (Ar'ara BaNegev Junction)	Highway 25	
Southern	Tel Arad	21	13	צומת תל ערד (Tel Arad Junction)	Highway 31	
Southern	Beit Yatir	34	21	צומת עמשא (Amasa Junction)	Route 316	
1.000 mi = 1.609 km; 1.000 km = 0.621 mi

== See also ==
- List of highways in Israel
