= Givat Ela =

Community settlement in northern Israel

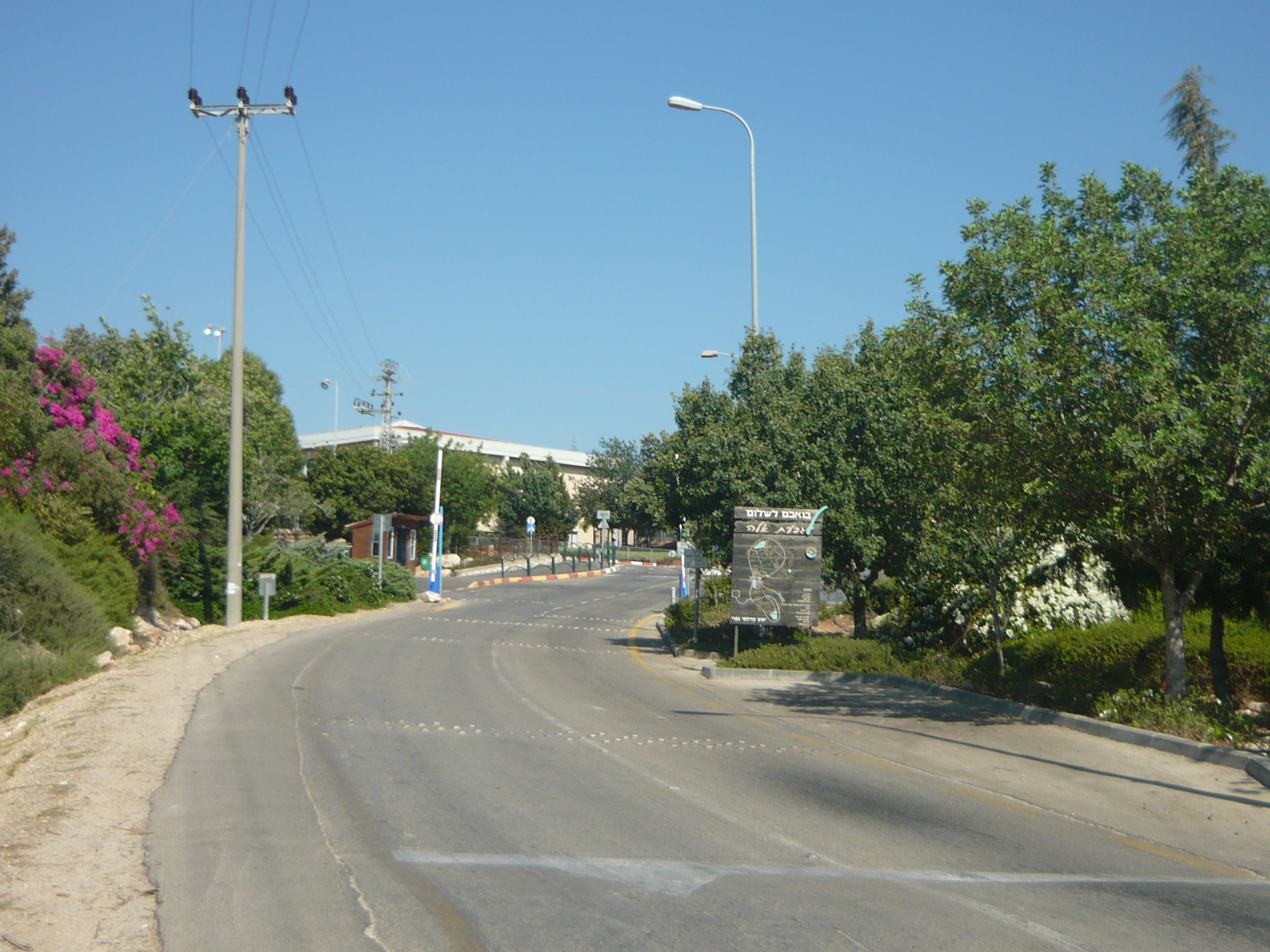

- Location within Jezreel Valley region of Israel
- Coordinates: 32°43′18″N 35°14′37″E
- Country: Israel
- District: Northern
- Subdistrict: Jezreel
- Council: Jezreel Valley
- Affiliation: HaMerkaz HaHakla'i
- Founded: 1988
- Population (2024): 1,780
- Website: www.givat-elah.org.il

Givat Ela (Hebrew: גִּבְעַת אֵלָה, lit. 'Ela Hill') is a community settlement in northern Israel. Located near Ilut and Zarzir, it falls under the jurisdiction of Jezreel Valley Regional Council. In 2024 it had a population of 1,780.

== History ==
The village was established in 1988 at the initiative of a gar'in of people from near Haifa.
