= Manshiyet Zabda =

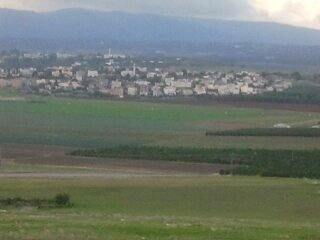

- Location within Haifa region of Israel Location within Israel
- Coordinates: 32°42′22″N 35°11′37″E
- Country: Israel
- District: Northern
- Subdistrict: Jezreel
- Council: Jezreel Valley
- Founded: 1945
- Founder: Sons of families from Ilut
- Population (2024): 1,551

Manshiyet Zabda (Arabic: منشية الزبدة; Hebrew: מנשית זבדה), also known as Manshiya Zabda, is a Muslim-majority Arab village in northern Israel. Located to the east of Ramat Yishai, it falls under the jurisdiction of Jezreel Valley Regional Council. In 2024 it had a population of 1,551.

== History ==
The village was established in 1945 by sons of families from Ilut. Over time the founders were joined by Bedouin (nomads) and fellahin (farmers) from the Galilee. The village was recognised by the authorities in 1979.

== See also ==
- Arab localities in Israel
- Bedouin in Israel
