= Suweid Hamira =

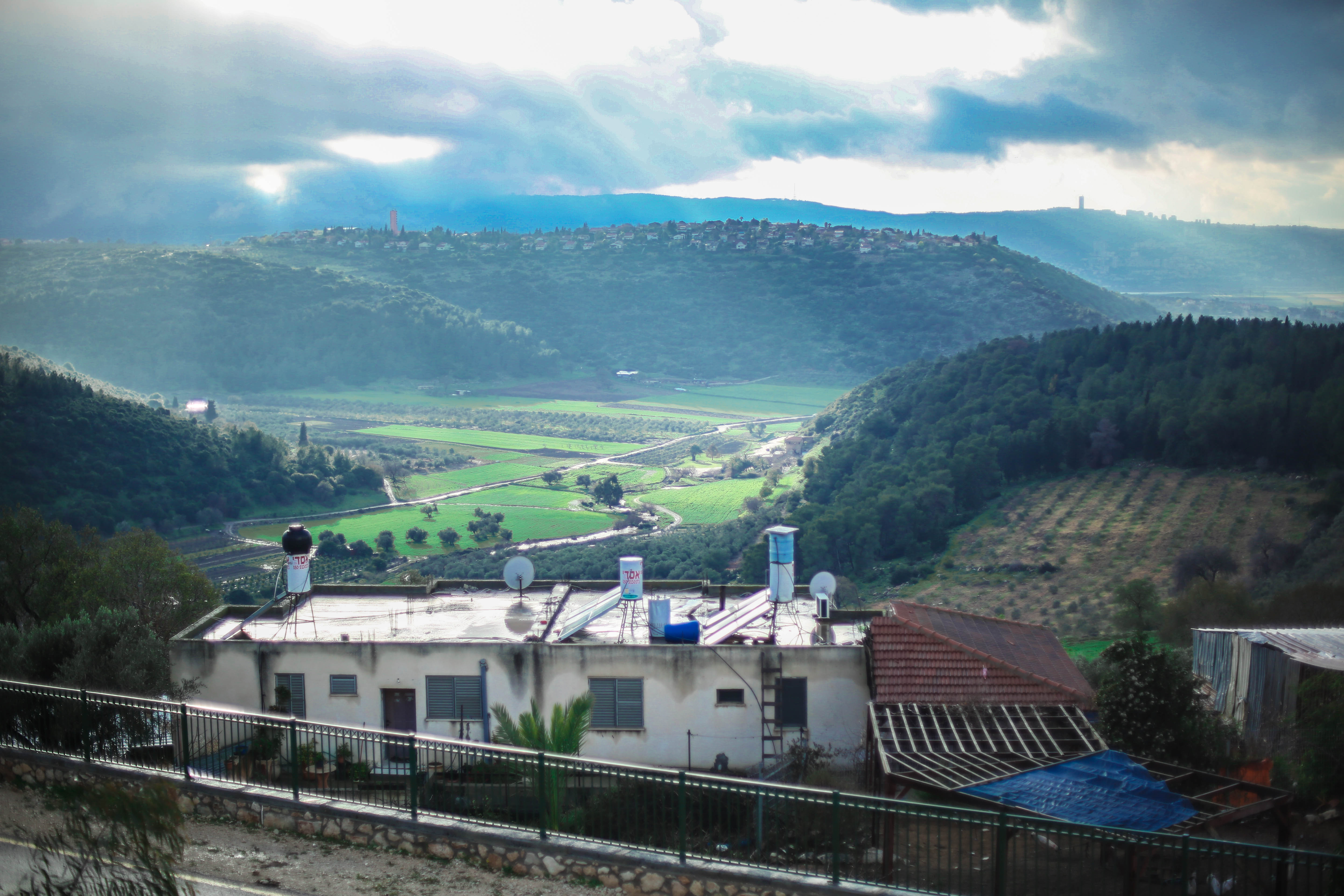

- Location within Jezreel Valley region of Israel Location within Israel
- Coordinates: 32°46′1″N 35°10′5″E
- Country: Israel
- District: Northern
- Subdistrict: Jezreel
- Council: Jezreel Valley
- Population (2024): 285

Suweid Hamira (Arabic: سواعد حميرة; Hebrew: סוויעד חמירה) is a Bedouin village in northern Israel. Located near Shefa-'Amr, it falls under the jurisdiction of Jezreel Valley Regional Council. In 2024 it had a population of 285.

The village was recognised by the state in 1996.

== See also ==
- Arab localities in Israel
- Bedouin in Israel
