= Alonim =

Kibbutz in northern Israel

Alonim: אַלּוֹנִים (Hebrew)
- Kibbutz

Hebrew transcription(s)
  - Official: Allonim
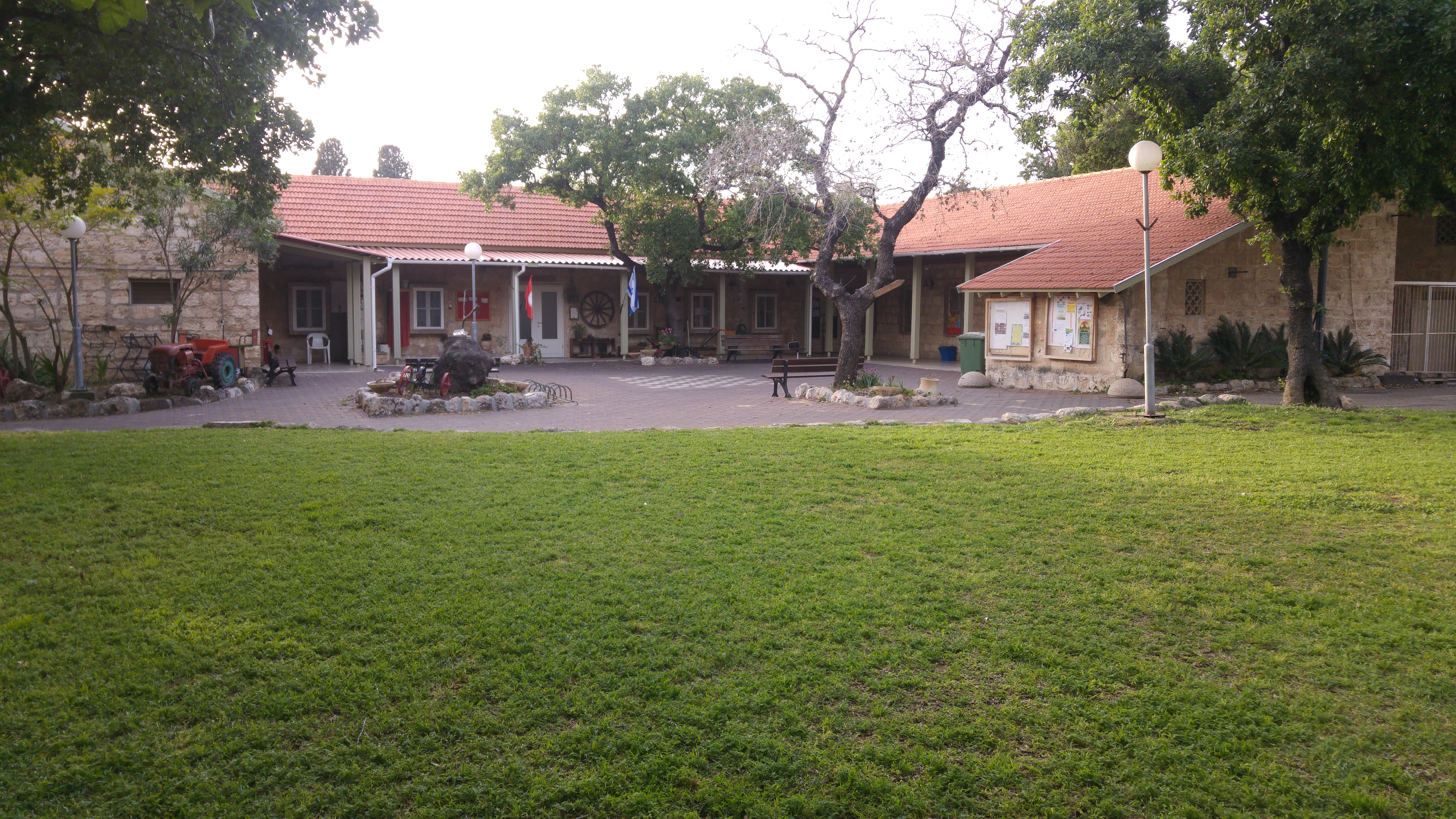

- Location within Jezreel Valley region of Israel
- Coordinates: 32°43′11″N 35°8′38″E
- Country: Israel
- District: Northern
- Subdistrict: Jezreel
- Council: Jezreel Valley
- Affiliation: Kibbutz Movement
- Founded: 26 June 1938
- Founder: German Jewish Refugees
- Population (2024): 784
- Website: www.alonim.org.il

Alonim (Hebrew: אַלּוֹנִים, lit. 'Oaks') is a kibbutz in northern Israel. Located in the Lower Galilee, it falls under the jurisdiction of Jezreel Valley Regional Council. In 2024 the kibbutz had a population of 784.

== History ==
=== Ottoman era ===
In the Ottoman era, a village called Qusqus, or Kuskus, was situated here. In 1859, the population was given as 100, with 16 feddans of tillage.

In 1875, Victor Guérin visited, and estimated that the village had 200 inhabitants. In 1881, the PEF's Survey of Western Palestine described Kuskus as an adobe village in the oak-woods on high ground.

=== British Mandate era ===
In 1925 a Zionist organisation purchased 30 feddans in Kiskis (present Alonim) and Tabon (present Kiryat Tiv'on) from the Sursuk family of Beirut. At the time, there were 36 families living there. From 1931, and lasting several years, the Jewish Agency struggled to evict the tenant farmers from Qusqus, from the land which was to become Alonim.

The kibbutz was established on 26 June 1938 as part of the tower and stockade settlement project.

During the 1936–39 Arab revolt in Palestine, Alonim was frequently attacked and three of its members were killed. It began as an orchard and dairy farm, and manufactured flutes, which were popular with Israeli children.

By 1945, al Tivon (Alonim) (previously Qusqus Taboun) had 370 Muslim and 320 Jewish inhabitants, with a total land area of 5,823 dunams. Of this land, 141 dunams were used for plantations and irrigable land, 2,038 for cereals, while 3,644 dunams were classified as non-cultivable land.

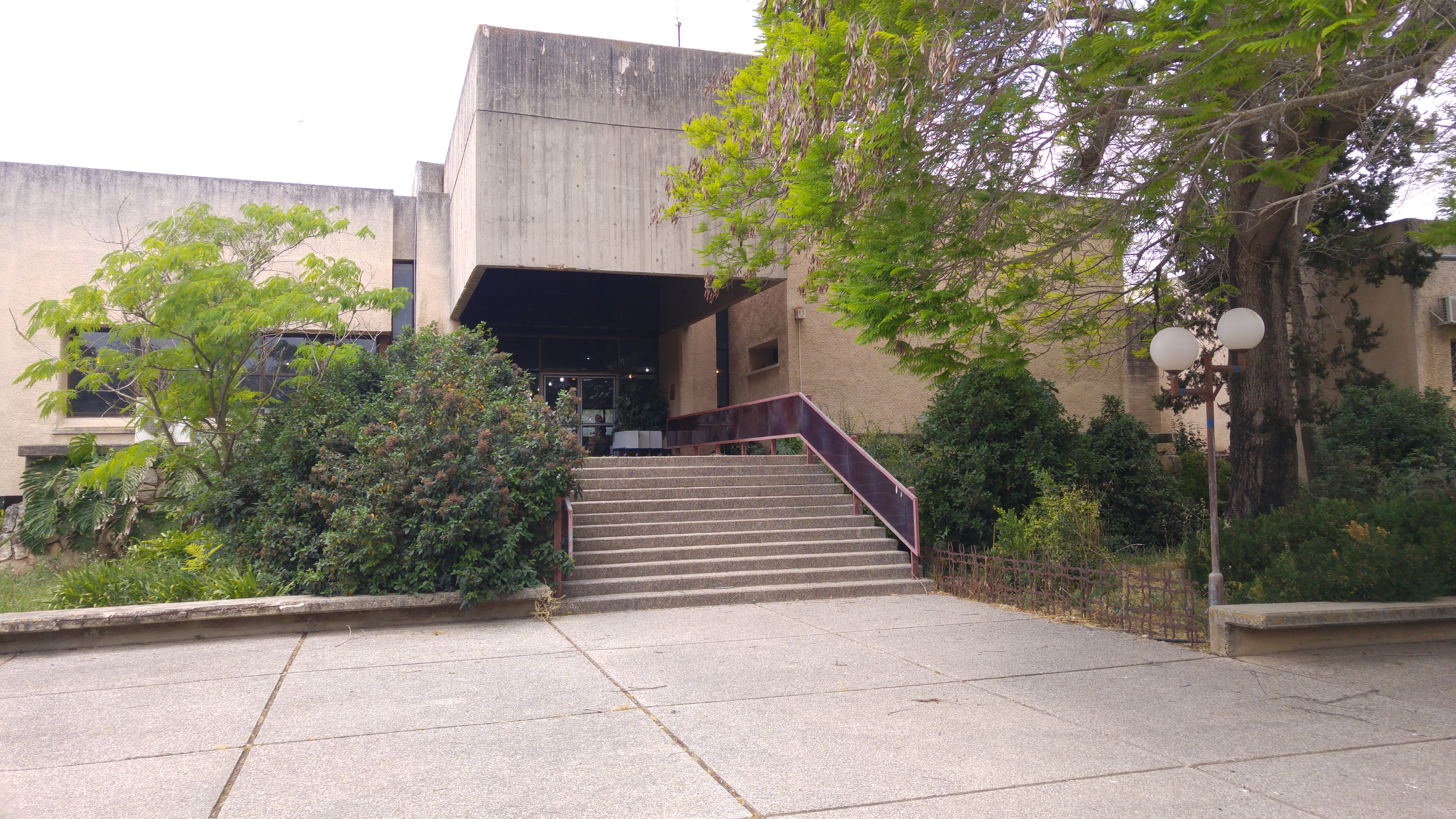
Alonim Dining Room

In 1947, Alonim had a population of over 450.

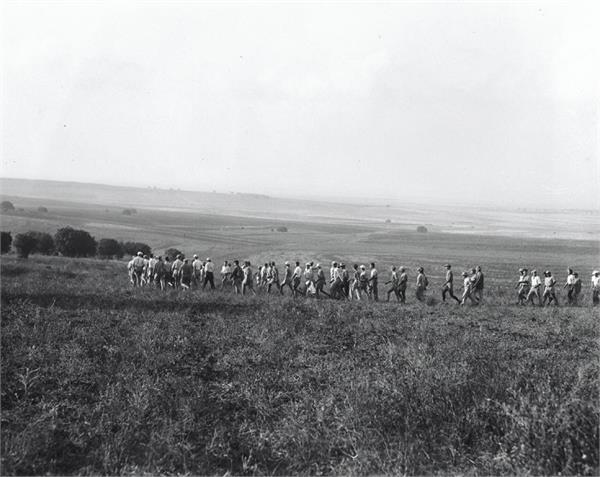
Alonim 1938. Arrival of colonists

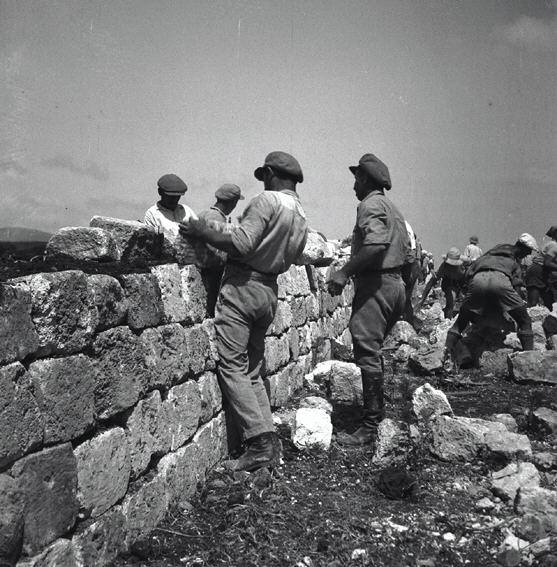
Alonim under construction, June 1938

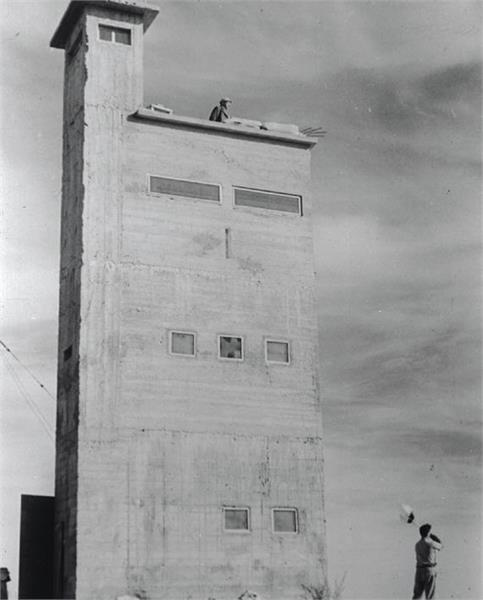
Alonim, a watchtower, 1938

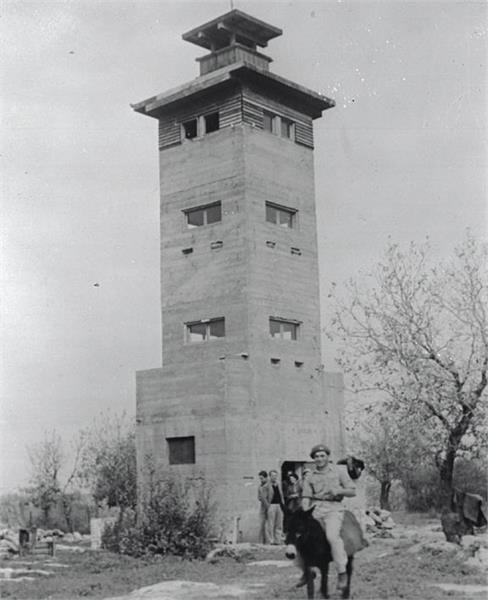
Alomin, a watchtower, 1939

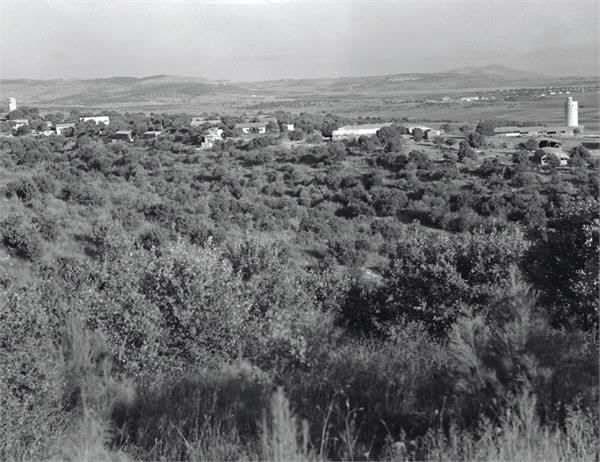
Alonim, 1945

=== State of Israel ===
The Israel National Arabian Horse Show is an annual event held at Kibbutz Alonim. As one of its economic branches, the kibbutz operates chicken coops in partnership with Kibbutz Hannaton.

== Bibliography ==
- Avneri, Arieh L. (1984). The Claim of Dispossession: Jewish Land-settlement and the Arabs, 1878-1948. Transaction Publishers. ISBN 0-87855-964-7.
- Conder, C.R.; Kitchener, H.H. (1882). The Survey of Western Palestine: Memoirs of the Topography, Orography, Hydrography, and Archaeology. Vol. 2. London: Committee of the Palestine Exploration Fund.
- Department of Statistics (1945). Village Statistics, April, 1945. Government of Palestine.
- Guérin, V. (1880). Description Géographique Historique et Archéologique de la Palestine (in French). Vol. 3: Galilee, pt. 1. Paris: L'Imprimerie Nationale.
- Hadawi, S. (1970). Village Statistics of 1945: A Classification of Land and Area ownership in Palestine. Palestine Liberation Organization Research Center. Archived from the original on 2018-12-08.
- Palmer, E.H. (1881). The Survey of Western Palestine: Arabic and English Name Lists Collected During the Survey by Lieutenants Conder and Kitchener, R. E. Transliterated and Explained by E.H. Palmer. Committee of the Palestine Exploration Fund.
