= HaYogev =

Moshav in northern Israel

HaYogev: הַיּוֹגֵב (Hebrew)
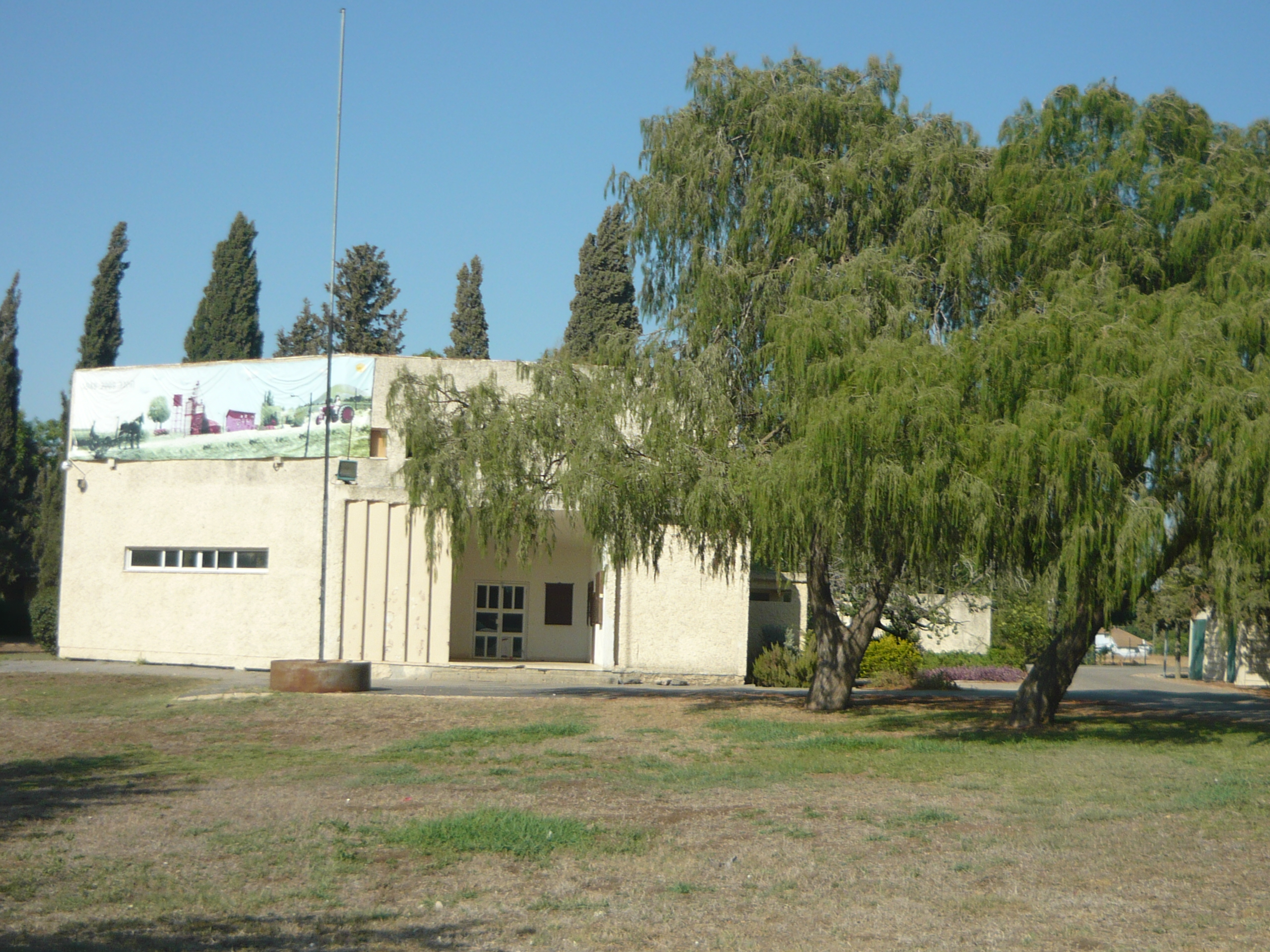
- Etymology: The Farmer
- Location within Jezreel Valley region of Israel
- Coordinates: 32°36′42″N 35°12′17″E
- Country: Israel
- District: Northern
- Subdistrict: Jezreel
- Council: Jezreel Valley
- Affiliation: Moshavim Movement
- Founded: 1949
- Founder: Moshavim Movement members
- Population (2024): 1,121

HaYogev (Hebrew: הַיּוֹגֵב, lit. 'The Farmer') is a moshav in northern Israel. Located around seven kilometres west of Afula, it falls under the jurisdiction of Jezreel Valley Regional Council. In 2024 it had a population of 1,121.

== Etymology ==
The name means "The Farmer". It consists of the Hebrew definite article Ha- ה, followed by the Hebrew word Yogev יּוֹגֵב, which means "husbandman, farmer".

== History ==
=== Antiquity ===
In September–October 2012 a trial excavation was conducted at Einot Nisanit, near HaYogev Junction. In a regional survey carried out in the area, Raban reported the presence of tombs in and around the site that date to the Middle Bronze, Iron, Persian, Hellenistic, Roman, Byzantine and Ottoman periods. In this site a well from the Neolithic period was discovered. One find during the dig was the bones of a woman around 19 years old, and a man between 30 and 40 years old, who were described as being among the "first farmers in the Jezreel Valley." In 2018, a gardener discovered a 700-year-old bronze ring while weeding a planting bed. Galilee. The intact artifact bears an image of Saint Nicholas, who is revered in Eastern Christianity as the patron saint of travelers.

=== Modern era ===
The moshav was founded in 1949 by a youth group from Austria, Germany, Romania and Israel who were members of the Beit Eshel lookout, which was destroyed during the 1948 Arab–Israeli War. It was located on land near the former depopulated Palestinian-Turkmen village of Khirbat Lid.

The access road was paved in 1951, but only part of it, which made it difficult for the inhabitants of the moshav for years until the road was completed at the end of 1956. Each farm was allocated between 65 and 70 dunams, half of it in the orchard and half in the communal groves. However, development of the moshav was stopped in the early period due to water shortages. This problem was resolved in 1955 when the moshav was connected to the wells of Mekorot in the Megiddo region. Another problem was the theft of cows and sheep by infiltrators. At the end of 1958 the moshav was connected to the electricity grid and in 1960 a post office branch was opened in the village.

The economy of the moshav is based on agriculture, including field crops, an olive press, dairy farms, poultry farms, greenhouses, as well as small businesses in various fields such as flower shops, organic crops, farm-to-table cooking workshops, horse stables which export to the Arab World and green construction. It is a home to the first free range organic-certified egg farm in Israel. The village also has an agricultural circus, a local cheese shop, a local chocolatier and a coffee stand.
