= Jezreel Valley Regional Council =

Regional council in southern Israel

Coordinates: 32°41′24″N 35°11′48″E

Jezreel Valley Regional Council מועצה אזורית עמק יזרעאל
- Regional council (from 1941)
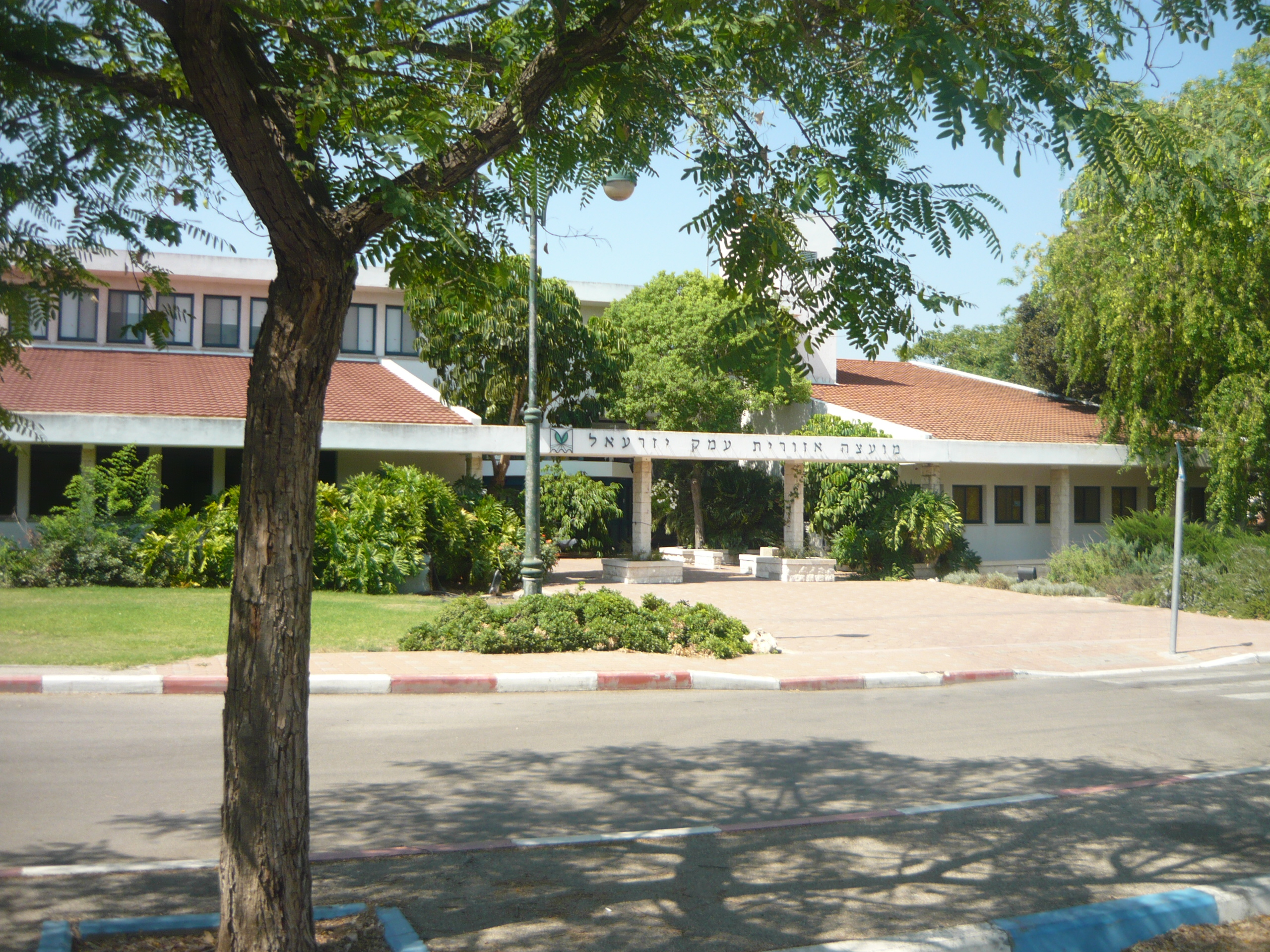
- The building of the regional council
- Interactive map of Jezreel Valley Regional Council
- Country: Israel
- District: Northern
- Subdistrict: Jezreel
- Natural region: Kokhav Plateau, Nazareth-Tir'an Mountains, Yizre'el Valley, Yokneam

Government
  - Head of Municipality: Shlomit Shihor Reichman

Area
  - Total: 333,920 dunams (333.92 km^{2}; 128.93 sq mi)

Population (2025)
  - Total: 42,212
  - Density: 126.41/km^{2} (327.41/sq mi)
- Website: www.emekyizrael.org.il

Jezreel Valley Regional Council (Hebrew: מועצה אזורית עמק יזרעאל, Mo'atza Azorit Emek Yizra'el) is a regional council in northern Israel that encompasses most of the settlements in the Jezreel Valley. It includes 15 kibbutzim, 15 moshavim, 6 community settlements and two Bedouin villages. Despite its name, some of these settlements are not located in the Jezreel Valley proper, but in the vicinity.

== History ==
The Jezreel Valley Regional Council was established at the end of 1941. It was the second regional council to be established, with the first being the Hefer Valley Regional Council. At the time of its establishment, the council included Balfouria, Ginegar, Kfar Gideon, Mahane Israel, Merhavia (kibbutz), Merhavia (moshav), Mizra, Tel Adashim and the educational institution Kfar Lidam.

Later, the council added the kibbutzim Gazit, Ein Dor, and Dovrat, which settled in the abandoned area of "Cameron Israel", and moshav HaYogev, which were founded in 1947–1949. So during the 1950s and 1960s, the council included 11 settlements.

The settlements of the western Jezreel Valley region were united with the settlements of the Megiddo region (then known as the Ephraim region) in the Gush Nahalal Committee, which at its peak included 22 settlements. With the organization of local councils, it was decided to establish three separate regional councils, partly because Nahalal and the settlements adjacent to it were in the Nazareth Subdistrict, while Beit She'arim and the settlements adjacent to it were in the Haifa Subdistrict. During the discussions regarding the municipal framework of the Gush Nahalal settlements, there was a proposal to establish three councils: the Megiddo Regional Council, the Kishon Regional Council, and the Nahalal Regional Council. The proposal was also made to attach the settlements of the Nahalal region to the Jezreel Regional Council.

However, this plan did not realize, and there was increased cooperation between the Nahalal and Kishon Councils instead. In 1957, the Nahalal and Kishon Councils were united, and were called the Kishon Regional Council.

In 1980, the Jezreel Regional Council and the Kishon Regional Council were merged, and created the Jezreel Valley Regional Council.

== List of communities ==
Kibbutzim

- Alonim
- Dovrat
- Ein Dor
- Gazit
- Gevat
- Ginegar
- Hanaton
- Harduf
- HaSolelim
- Kfar HaHoresh
- Merhavia
- Mizra
- Ramat David
- Sarid
- Yifat

Moshavim

- Alonei Abba
- Alon HaGalil
- Balfouria
- Beit She'arim
- Beit Zeid
- Bethlehem of Galilee
- HaYogev
- Kfar Barukh
- Kfar Gidon
- Kfar Yehoshua
- Merhavia
- Nahalal
- Sde Ya'akov
- Tel Adashim
- Zippori

Community settlements

- Adi
- Ahuzat Barak
- Givat Ela
- Hoshaya
- Shimshit
- Timrat

Arab villages

- Manshiya Zabda
- Suweid Hamira

== Demographics ==
Historical population
Year	Pop.	±%
1972	8,600	—
1983	10,200	+18.6%
1995	16,600	+62.7%
2008	29,400	+77.1%
2022	40,602	+38.1%
2024	41,145	+1.3%

== Voting Patterns ==
In the 2022 election, 78 percent of voters in the regional council voted for the parties of the center-left coalition led by Yair Lapid, while 19 percent voted for the parties of the right-wing coalition led by Benjamin Netanyahu and 3 percent voted for the Arab parties.

In the 2026 election, 75 percent of voters in the regional council voted for the parties of the center-left coalition led by Gadi Eisenkot, while 16 percent voted for the parties of the right-wing coalition led by Benjamin Netanyahu and 4 percent voted for the Arab parties. An additional 3.2 percent voted for the Reservists, and 2.3 percent voted for Amcha Yisrael. Voter turnout increased 15 percent from the 2022 election.
