= Kfar Baruch =

Moshav in northern Israel

Kfar Baruch: כְּפַר בָּרוּךְ (Hebrew)
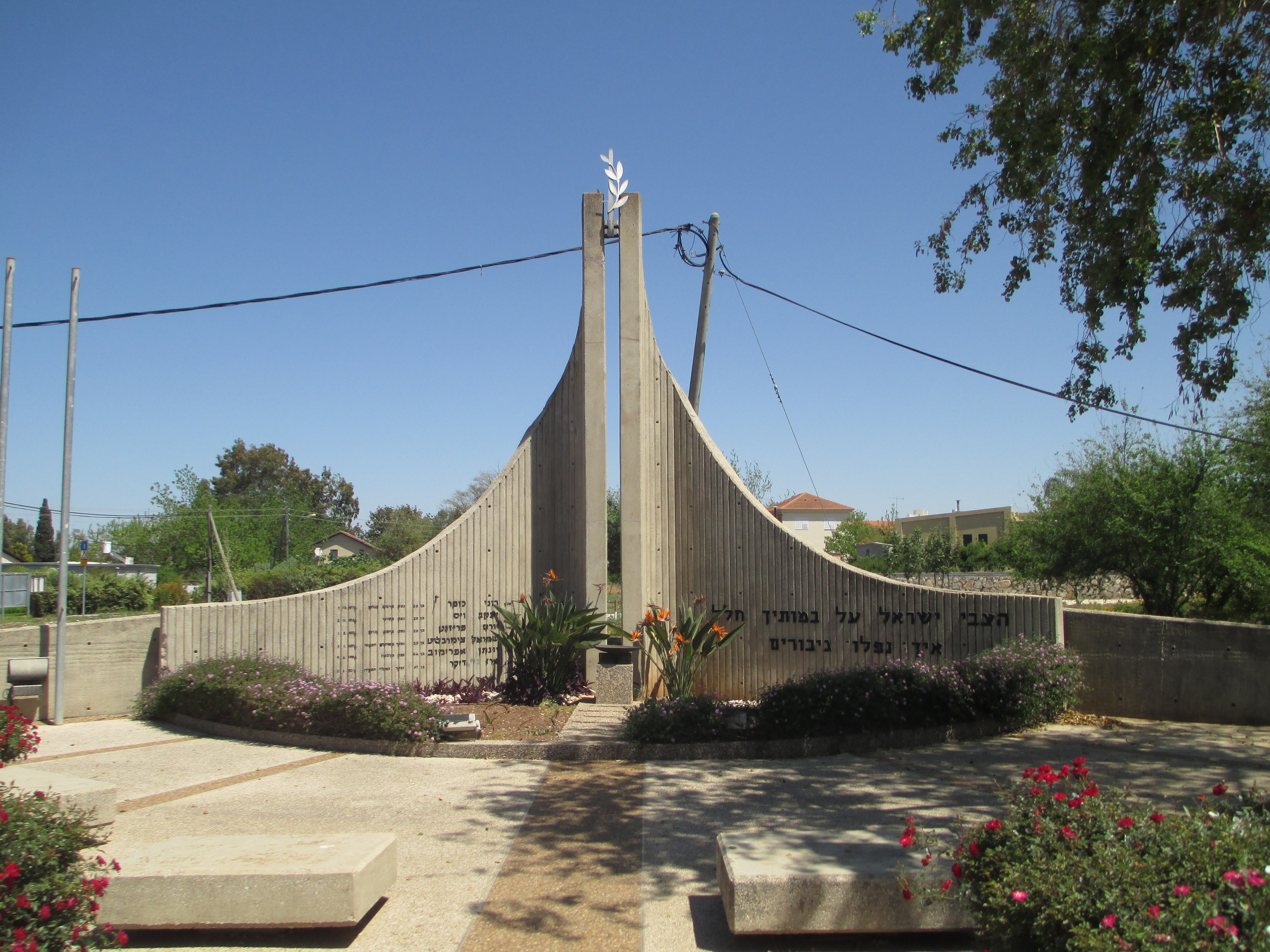
- Etymology: Baruch Village
- Location within Jezreel Valley region of Israel
- Coordinates: 32°38′47″N 35°11′22″E
- Country: Israel
- District: Northern
- Subdistrict: Jezreel
- Council: Jezreel Valley
- Affiliation: Moshavim Movement
- Founded: 1926
- Founder: New immigrants
- Population (2024): 820

Kfar Barukh (Hebrew: כְּפַר בָּרוּךְ, lit. 'Baruch Village') is a moshav in northern Israel. Located near Afula, it falls under the jurisdiction of Jezreel Valley Regional Council. In 2024 it had a population of 820.

== History ==
The moshav was founded in 1926 by immigrants from the Bulgaria, Caucasus, Kurdistan and Romania. It was named after Baruch Kahane, a Jewish philanthropist in Romania who bequeathed his assets to the village.

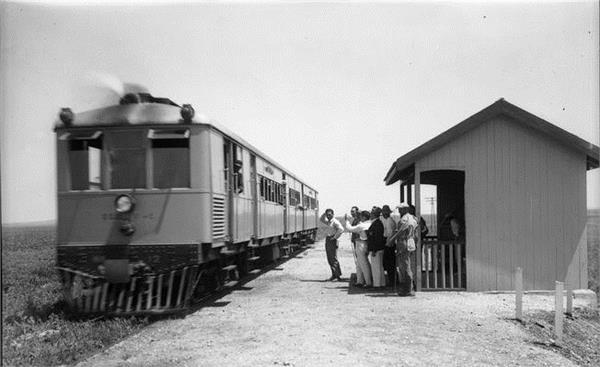
Kfar Baruch railway station 1929

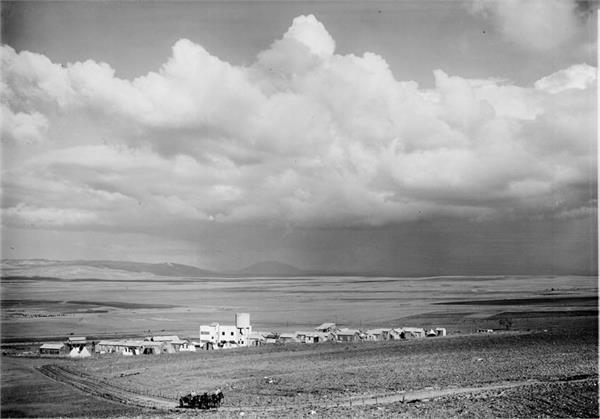
Kfar Baruch 1934

== Archaeology ==
A loculi tomb with two chambers was discovered near Kfar Baruch. Inside, an ossuary was found, with the inscription "Iudas (son) of Thaddeus". It dates back to the 1st to 2nd centuries AD.
