= Harduf =

Harduf: הרדוף (Hebrew)
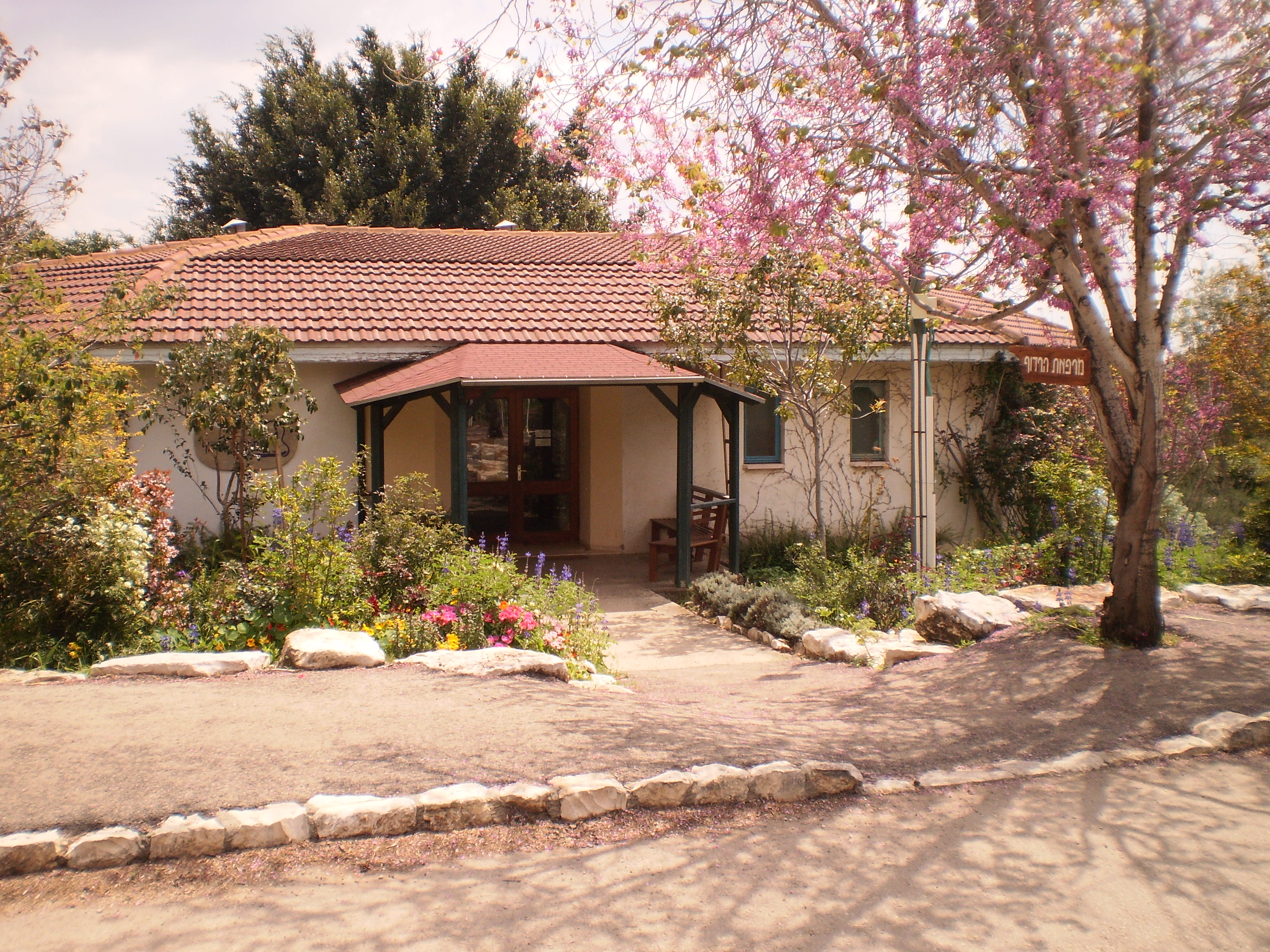
- Etymology: Oleander
- Location within Jezreel Valley region of Israel Location within Israel
- Coordinates: 32°45′49″N 35°10′26″E
- Country: Israel
- District: Northern
- Subdistrict: Jezreel
- Council: Jezreel Valley
- Affiliation: Kibbutz Movement
- Founded: 1982
- Founder: Jesaiah Ben-Aharon
- Population (2024): 844
- Website: harduf.org.il

Harduf (Hebrew: הַרְדּוּף, lit. 'Oleander') is a kibbutz in northern Israel. Located in the Lower Galilee, it falls under the jurisdiction of Jezreel Valley Regional Council. In 2024 it had a population of 844.

== History ==
The kibbutz was established in 1982 by Jesaiah Ben-Aharon and other followers of Rudolf Steiner, and was named after the oleander plants growing in the area. Kibbutz members live according to the anthroposophy philosophy. Harduf has several health centers: Beit Elisha, for rehabilitation of adults with special needs; the Tuvia community, for children and youth who have been removed from their homes and need a new foster family; and the Hiram, which seeks to help youths who suffer from emotional problems.

In 2002 Sha'ar LaAdam was founded in the adjacent forest, which also belongs to Harduf. This community is dedicated to improving and maintaining relations between Jews from the kibbutz and Arabs from the surrounding villages.

In 2007 Harduf cut off its local sewage from the national system, in order to cleanse the waste matter so it can be used for watering stalks and trees. The members plan to set up an ecological park on recycled water.

== See also ==
- Agriculture in Israel
