= Dovrat, Israel =

Dovrat
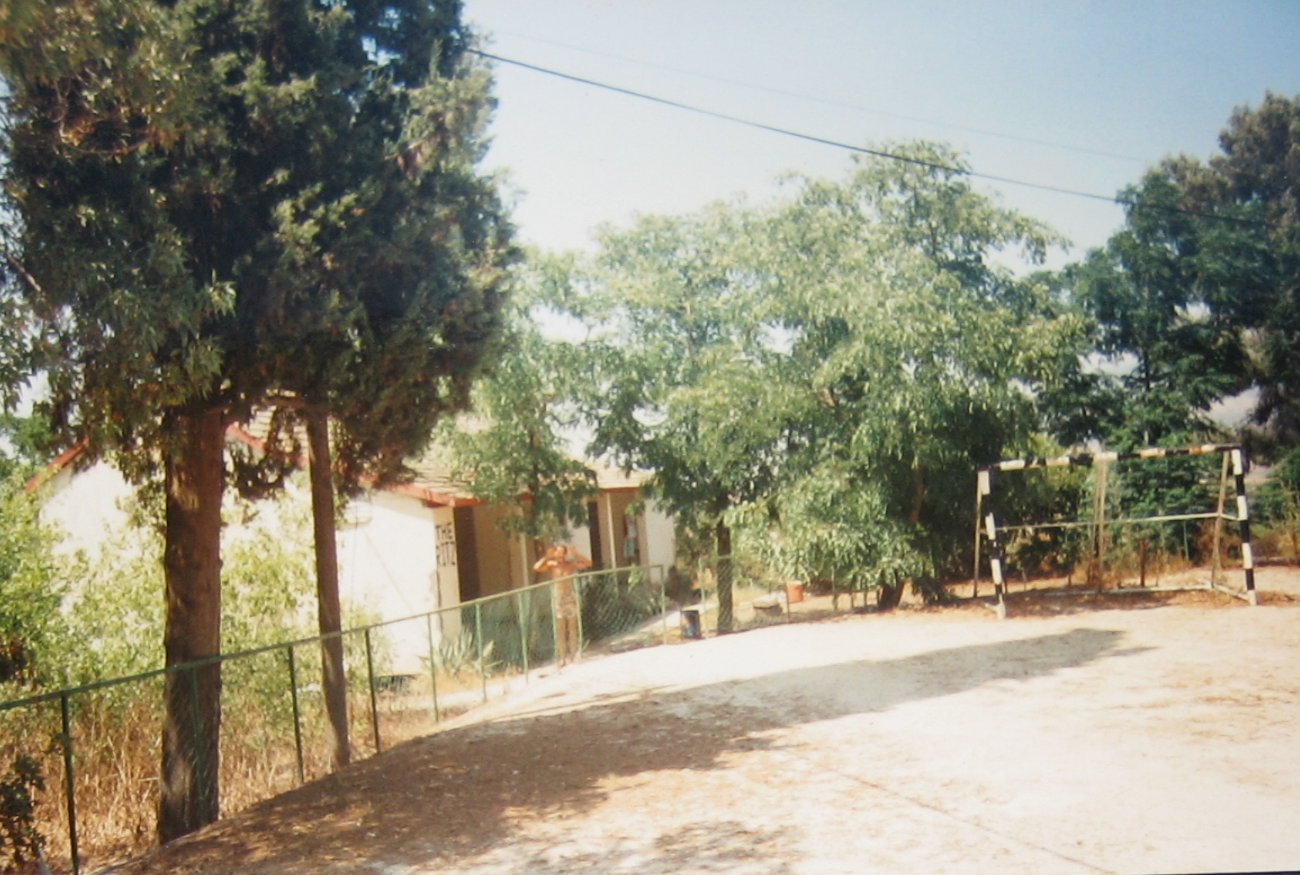

- Location within Jezreel Valley region of Israel Location within Israel
- Coordinates: 32°38′50″N 35°20′58″E
- Country: Israel
- District: Northern
- Subdistrict: Jezreel
- Council: Jezreel Valley
- Affiliation: Kibbutz Movement
- Founded: 30 October 1946
- Founder: Austrian and German Jews
- Population (2024): 614
- Website: www.dovrat.org

Dovrat (Hebrew: דָּבְרַת) is a kibbutz in northern Israel. Located near Afula, it falls under the jurisdiction of Jezreel Valley Regional Council. As of 2024 it had a population of 614.

== History ==
Kibbutz Dovrat was established on 30 October 1946 by members of the Zra'im group, mostly immigrants from Austria and Germany who arrived before the start of World War II. In 1942, the group assembled in Ein Harod to prepare for the establishment of a new kibbutz. The kibbutz was named after the Levite city of Daberath, located in the territory of the Tribe of Issachar (Joshua 21:28).

In 1947, the Jewish National Fund purchased land nearby. During the 1948 Arab-Israeli War the kibbutz was moved to the new site, initially known as Dovrat Illit (Upper Dovrat).

== Photographs of construction ==
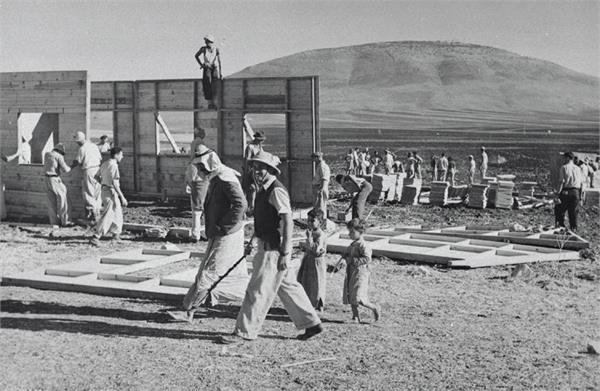

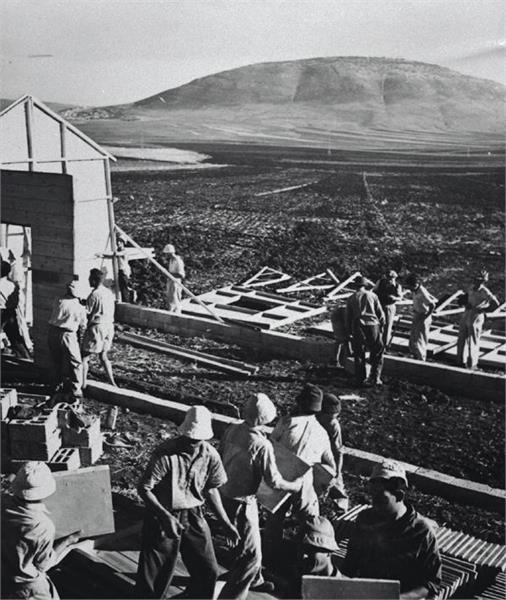

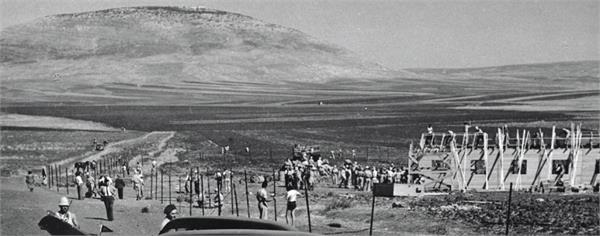

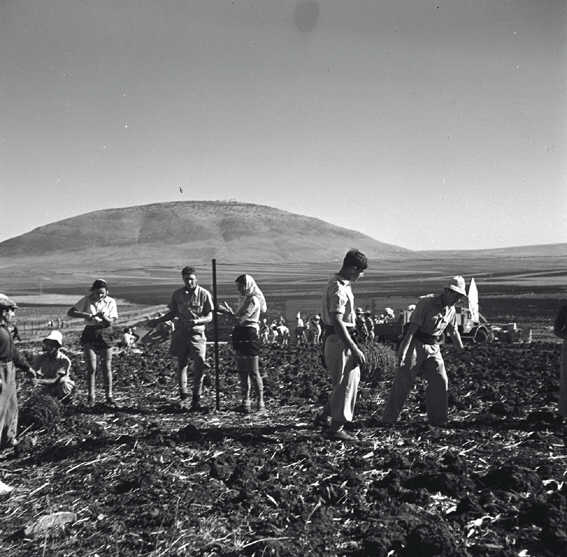

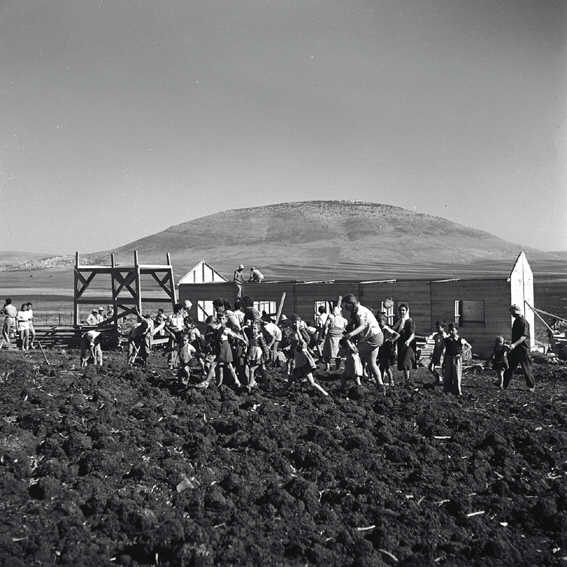

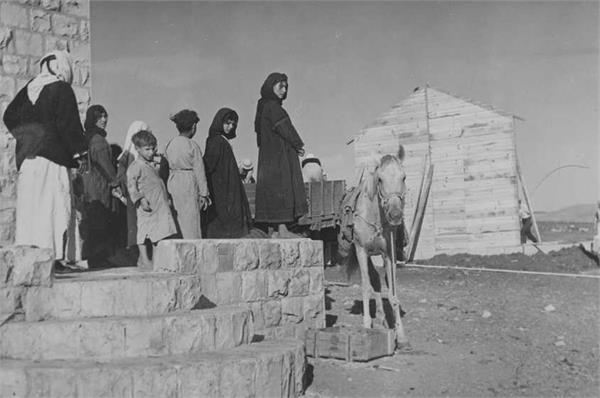

== See also ==
- Noam Dovrat (born 2002), Israeli basketball player
