= Sde Ya'akov =

Moshav in northern Israel

Sde Ya'akov: שְׂדֵה יַעֲקֹב (Hebrew)
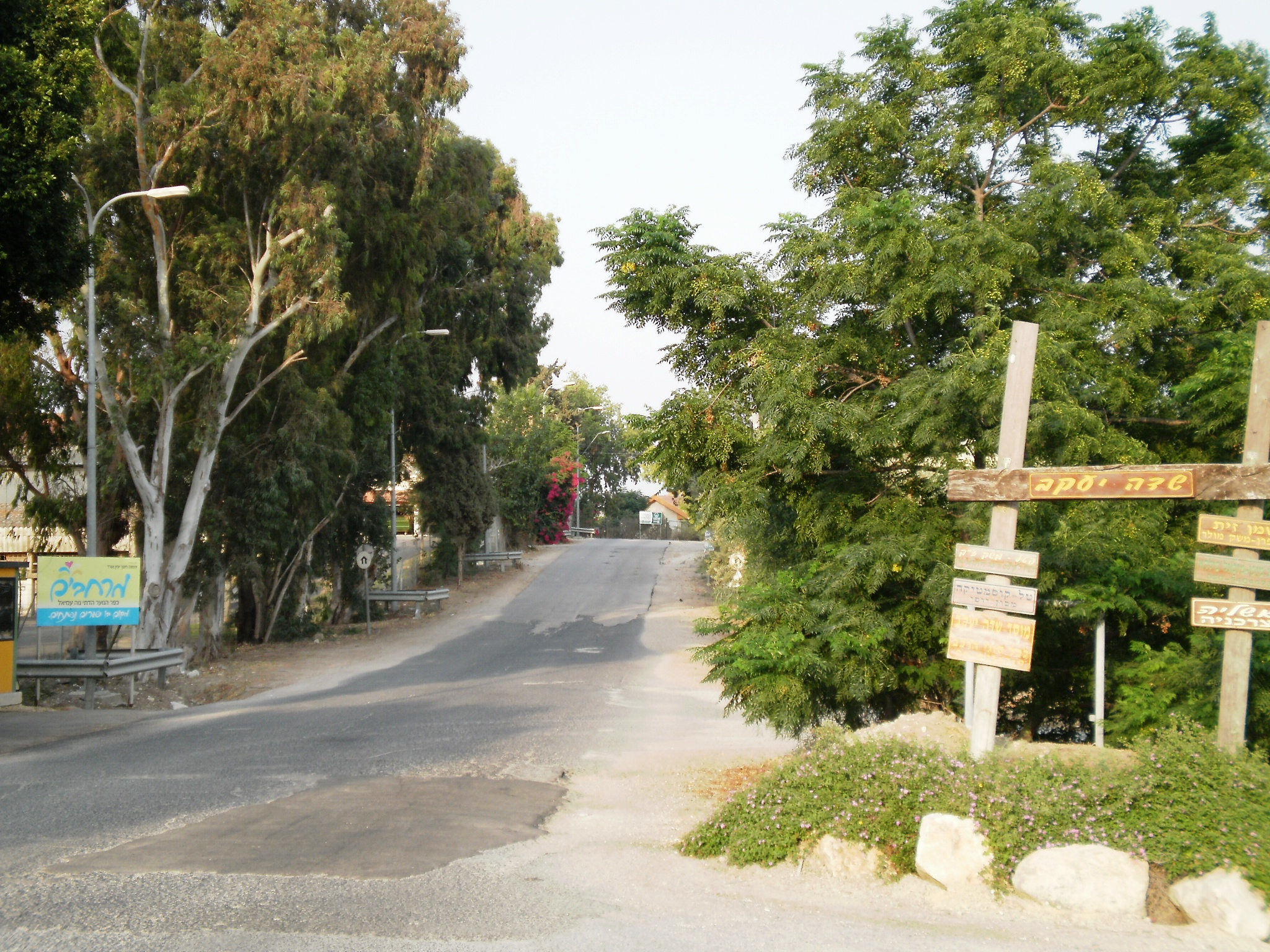
- Road entrance to Sde Ya'akov
- Etymology: Ya'akov's Field
- Location within Jezreel Valley region of Israel
- Coordinates: 32°41′48″N 35°8′28″E
- Country: Israel
- District: Northern
- Subdistrict: Jezreel
- Council: Jezreel Valley
- Affiliation: Hapoel HaMizrachi
- Founded: 1927
- Founder: Hapoel HaMizrachi Pioneers
- Population (2024): 1,082

Sde Ya'akov (Hebrew: שְׂדֵה יַעֲקֹב, lit. Ya'akov's Field) is a religious moshav in northern Israel. Located near Kiryat Tiv'on, it falls under the jurisdiction of Jezreel Valley Regional Council. In 2024 it had a population of 1,082.

== History ==
Sde Ya'akov was established in 1927 by pioneers who settled in Sheikh Abreik after its purchase by the Jewish Agency. It was the first settlement founded by Hapoel HaMizrachi and was named for Yitzchak Yaacov Reines, founder of the Mizrachi movement.

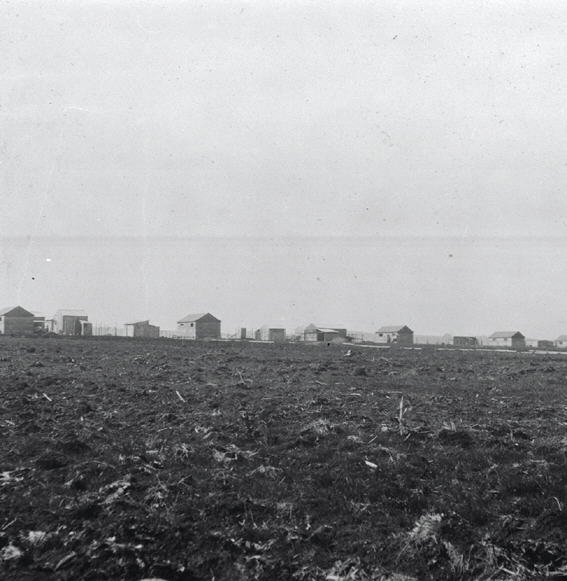
Sde Ya’akov 1928

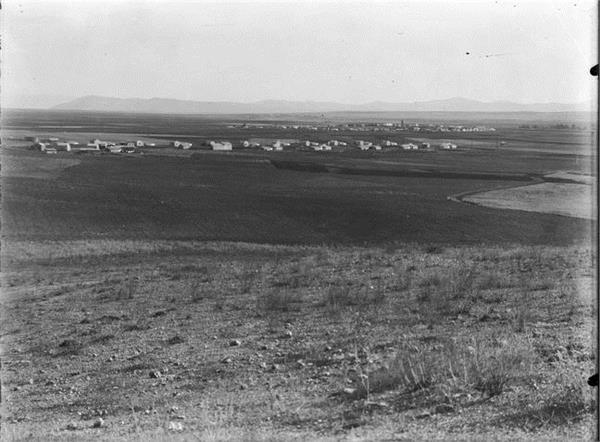
Sde Ya’akov 1935

Sde Ya’akov 1945

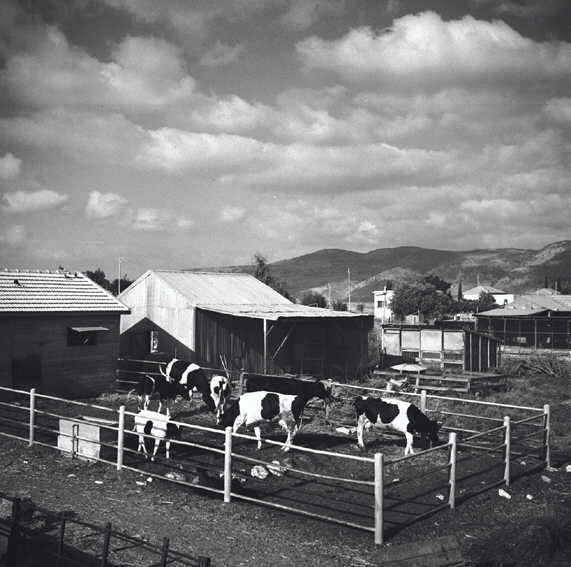
Sde Ya’akov 1947

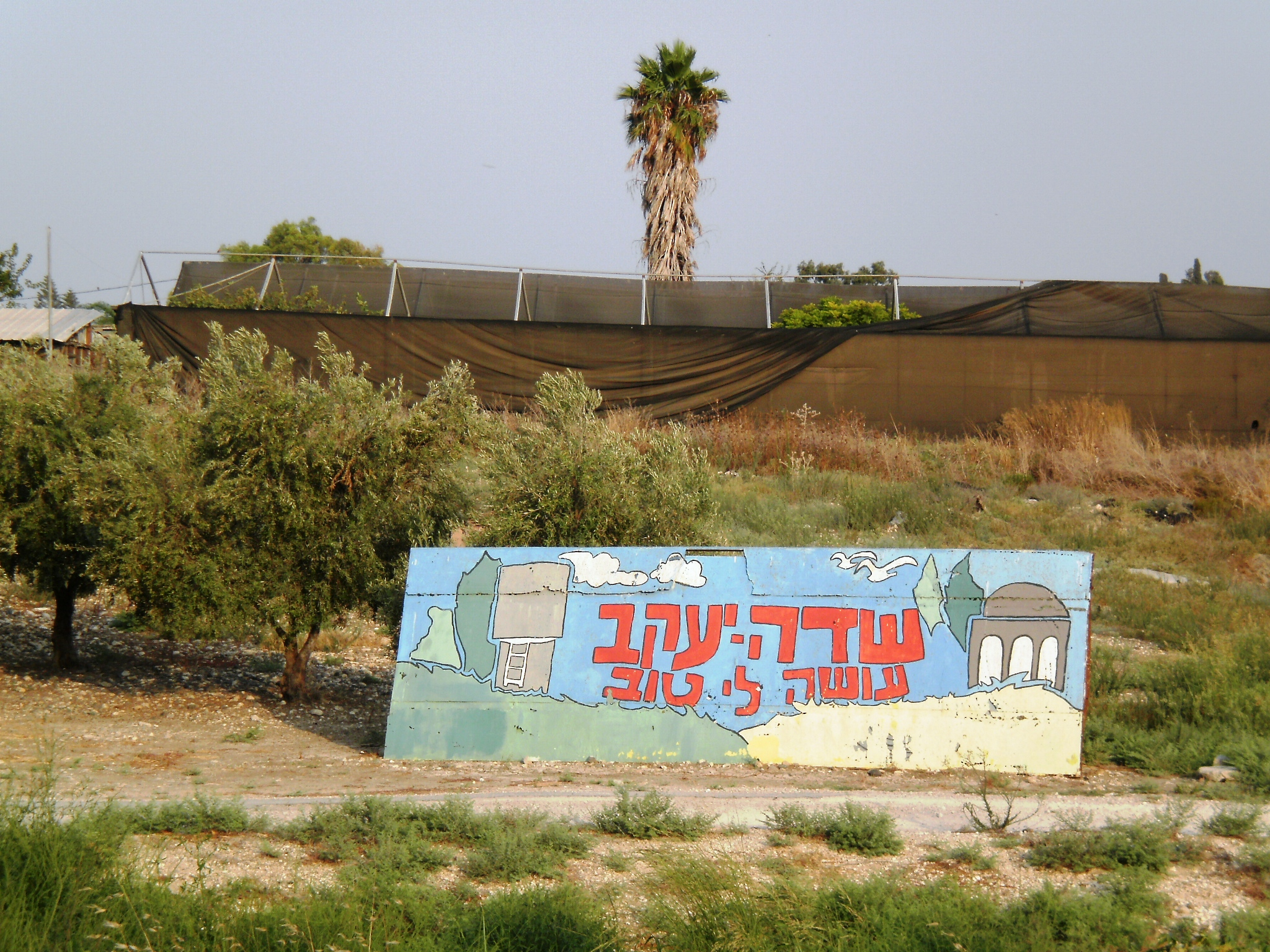
A sign at the entrance to Sde Ya'akov

== Ancient site of Tel Yizhaki ==
Several kilometers to the southwest, lies an unexcavated tell named Tel Yizhaki or Hurvat Izhaqia. Among the discoveries at this site is a column base featuring an Aramaic inscription in Hebrew script, mentioning a donor named "Yudah son of Sardah". It is believed that the inscription was part of an ancient synagogue.
