= Ginegar =

Kibbutz in northern Israel

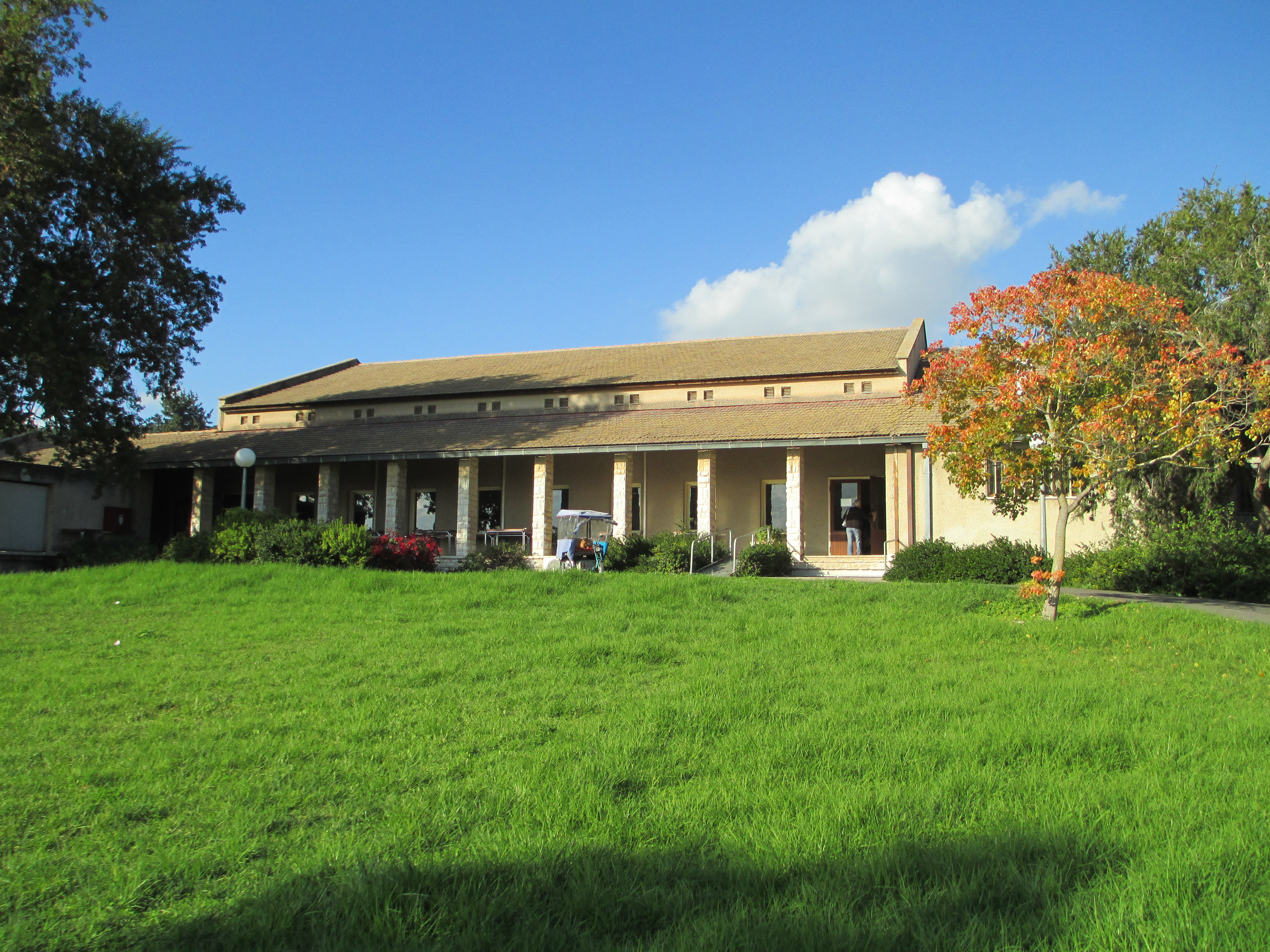

- Location within Jezreel Valley region of Israel
- Coordinates: 32°39′50″N 35°15′30″E
- Grid position: 174/230 PAL
- Country: Israel
- District: Northern
- Subdistrict: Jezreel
- Council: Jezreel Valley
- Affiliation: Kibbutz Movement
- Founded: 1922
- Founder: Polish and Russian Jews
- Population (2024): 750
- Website: www.ginegar.net

Ginegar (Hebrew: גִּנֵּיגָר), is a kibbutz in northern Israel not far from Nazareth. Located near Migdal HaEmek, it falls under the jurisdiction of Jezreel Valley Regional Council. In 2024 it had a population of 750.

== History ==
=== Ottoman period ===
In the Ottoman era, there was an Arab village here called Junjar, probably preserving the name of the ancient Jewish village Nigenar or Neginegar, traditionally considered the seat of rabbi Johanan ben Nuri. The village was mentioned in the defter (tax register) for the year 1555–6, named Junjar, located in the nahiya of Tabariyya of the liwa of Safad. The village was designated as timar land.

In 1882, the PEF's Survey of Western Palestine (SWP) described Junjar as a small adobe village, at the foot of the hills, supplied by a well. A population list from about 1887 showed that Junjar had about 125 inhabitants; all Muslims.

Gottlieb Schumacher, as part of surveying for the construction of the Jezreel Valley railway, noted in 1900 that Junjar had about 70 inhabitants living in 16 huts, a slight increase compared to the SWP findings.

=== British Mandate ===
==== Jinjar (Arab village) ====
The area was acquired by the Jewish community as part of the Sursock Purchase. In 1921, 4,000 dunums of land in Jinjar were sold to Zionist groups by the Sursock family, its absentee landlords from Lebanon. At the time, there were 25 families living there.

At the time of the 1922 census of Palestine, Jenjar had a population of 175: 13 Jews, 118 Muslims and 44 Christians, the latter comprising 31 Orthodox and 13 Roman Catholics.

==== Kibbutz Ginegar ====
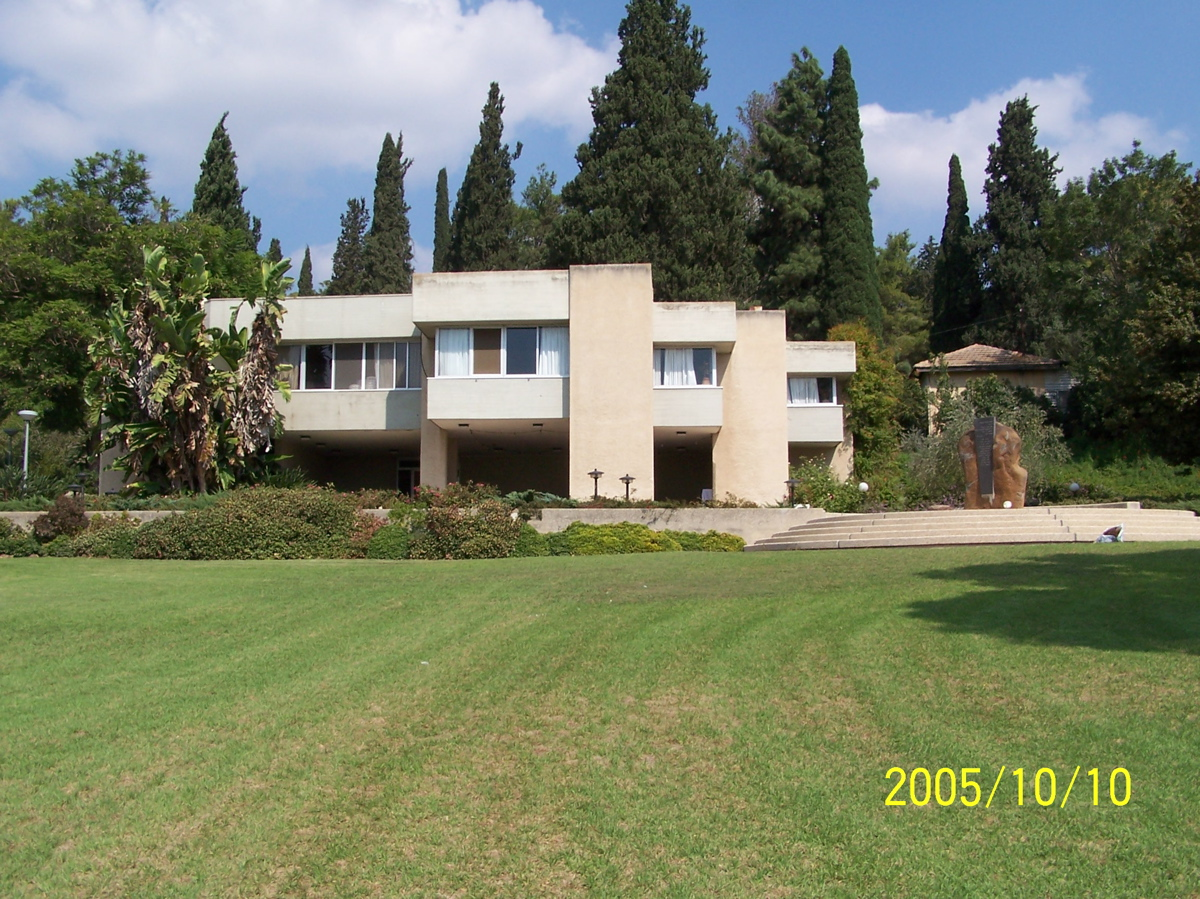
Kibbutz Ginegar's culture hall

The kibbutz was established in 1922 in the Lower Galilee on the eve of Rosh Hashanah. The kibbutz was named after the ancient well of Gingar, which can today still be found under the laundry. The kibbutz founders, working at moshavim in the area at the time, came in the Second and Third Aliyahs. They united in 1920 to establish Degania Gimel ("Degania 3") south of Degania Bet ("Degania 2"), at a site later used by kibbutz Beit Zera. From here they needed to move due to a lack of land, and so they arrived at Ginegar, which is believed to be a distortion of Nagnager, a village in the Galilee cited in the Talmud.

In 1928, the Jewish National Fund recruited members of Ginegar to plant the Balfour Forest, its first forestation project.

In the 1931 census it had a population of 109, all Jews, in a total of 17 houses.

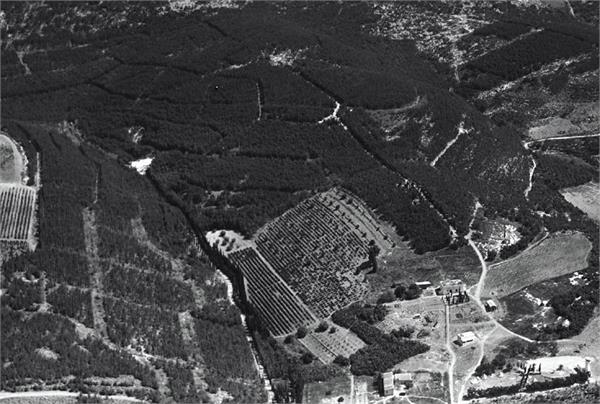
Ginegar 1939

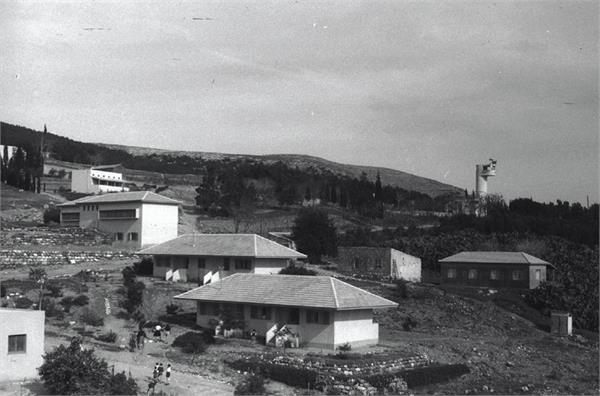
Ginegar, 1942

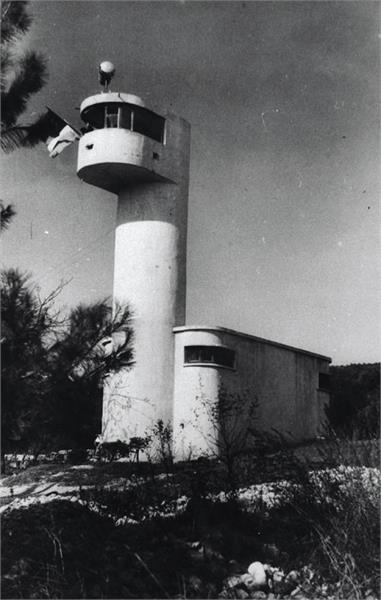
Ginegar watchtower, 1942

== Economy ==
On the kibbutz is a large plastics factory, also named Ginegar. The factory produces mainly plastic products for agriculture. Ginegar accepted volunteers who lived and worked on the kibbutz for many years, but the volunteer program was eventually phased out.

== Bibliography ==
- Barron, J. B., ed. (1923). Palestine: Report and General Abstracts of the Census of 1922. Government of Palestine.
- Conder, C.R.; Kitchener, H.H. (1882). The Survey of Western Palestine: Memoirs of the Topography, Orography, Hydrography, and Archaeology. Vol. 2. London: Committee of the Palestine Exploration Fund.
- Grootkerk, Salomon E. (2000). Ancient sites in Galilee: a toponymic gazetteer (Illustrated ed.). BRILL. ISBN 978-90-04-11535-4.
- Mills, E., ed. (1932). Census of Palestine 1931. Population of Villages, Towns and Administrative Areas. Jerusalem: Government of Palestine.
- Palmer, E.H. (1881). The Survey of Western Palestine: Arabic and English Name Lists Collected During the Survey by Lieutenants Conder and Kitchener, R. E. Transliterated and Explained by E.H. Palmer. Committee of the Palestine Exploration Fund. "beetles"; a ruined tower p. 146)
- Rhode, H. (1979). Administration and Population of the Sancak of Safed in the Sixteenth Century. Columbia University. Archived from the original on 2019-04-20.
- Schumacher, G. (1888). "Population list of the Liwa of Akka". Quarterly Statement - Palestine Exploration Fund. 20: 169–191.
- Schumacher, G. (1900). "Reports from Galilee". Quarterly Statement - Palestine Exploration Fund. 32 (4): 355–360. doi:10.1179/peq.1900.32.4.355.
