= Ahuzat Barak =

Community settlement in northern Israel

Ahuzat Barak: אחוזת ברק (Hebrew)
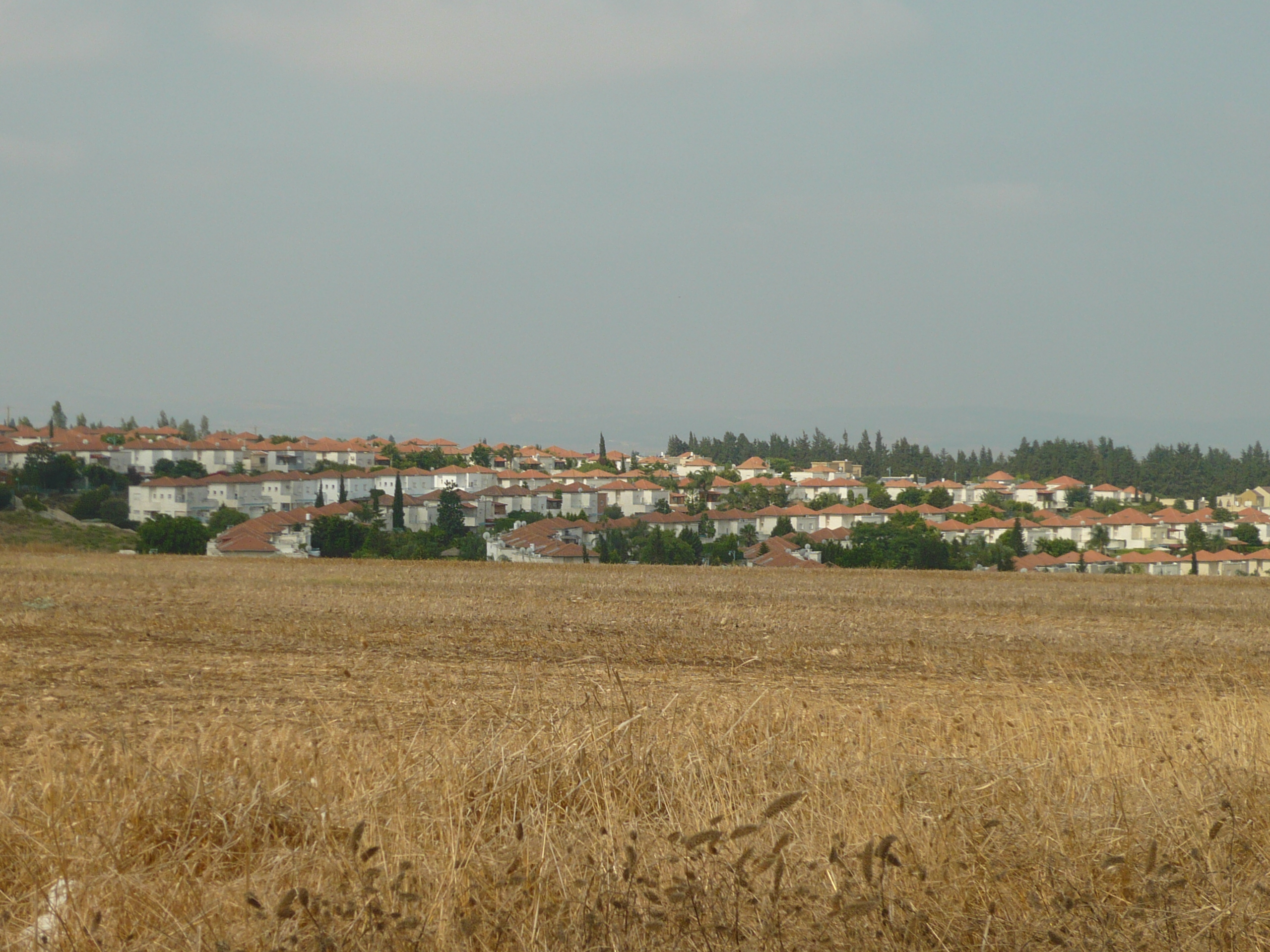
- Etymology: Barak Estate
- Location within Jezreel Valley region of Israel Location within Israel
- Coordinates: 32°38′32″N 35°20′19″E
- Country: Israel
- District: Northern
- Subdistrict: Jezreel
- Council: Jezreel Valley
- Founded: 1998
- Population (2024): 2,460
- Website: Ahuzat Barak

Ahuzat Barak (Hebrew: אחוזת ברק, lit. 'Barak Estate') is a community settlement in northern Israel. Located to the east of Afula, it falls under the jurisdiction of Jezreel Valley Regional Council. In 2024 it had a population of 2,460.

== History ==
The village was established in 1998 as a collaboration between the private sector and Jezreel Valley Regional Council. It was named after the biblical figure of Barak (Judges 4:6), who defeated the army of Jabin, king of Hazor, in the Jezreel Valley. It has absorbed several immigrants from South America.
