= Shimshit =

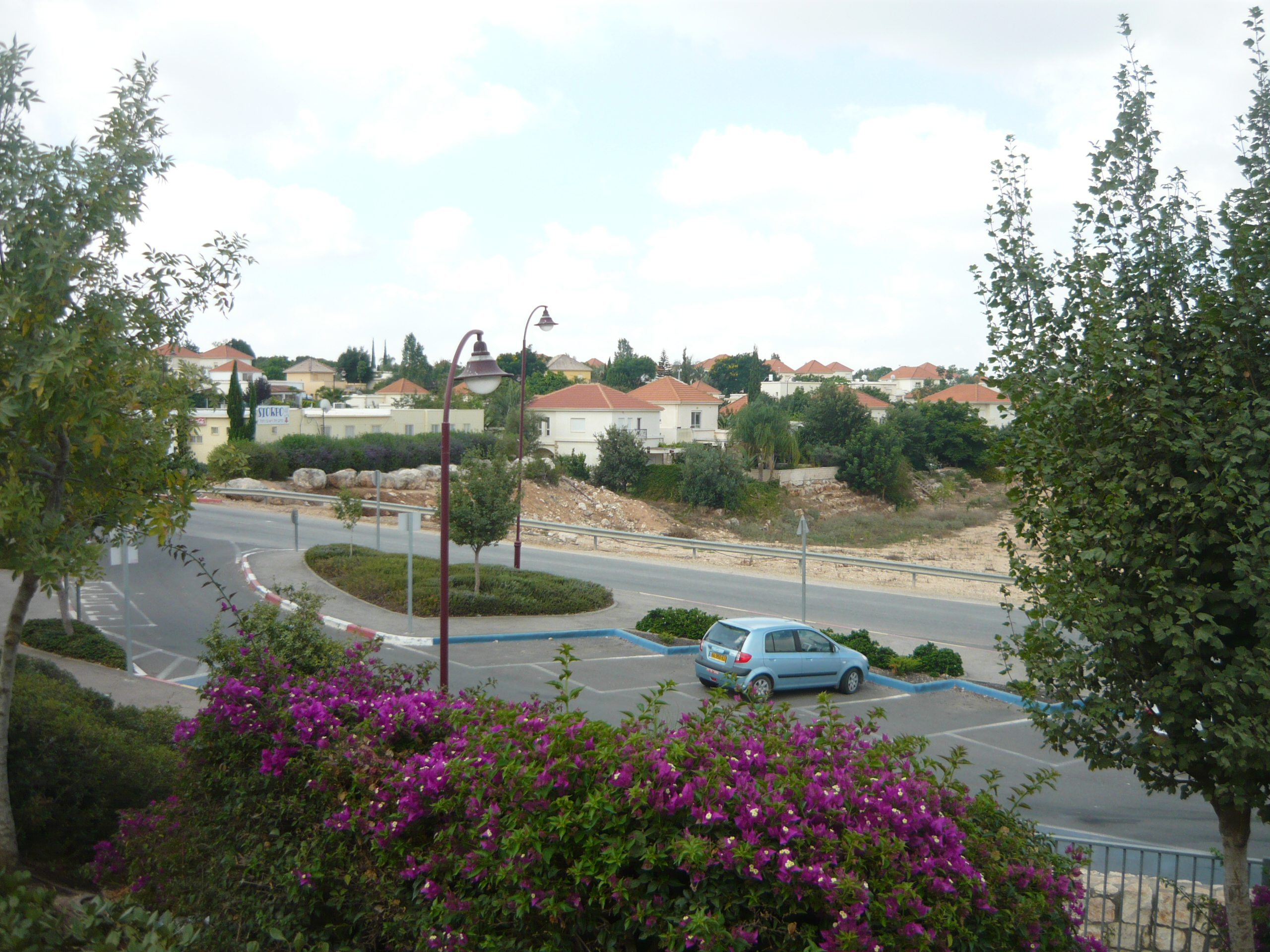

- Location within Jezreel Valley region of Israel
- Coordinates: 32°44′0″N 35°14′48″E
- Country: Israel
- District: Northern
- Subdistrict: Jezreel
- Council: Jezreel Valley
- Founded: 2000
- Founder: Tzibi Springer
- Population (2024): 2,154
- Website: www.shimshit.org.il

Shimshit (Hebrew: שִׁמְשִׁית) is a secular community settlement in northern Israel. Located to the north-west of Nazareth, it falls under the jurisdiction of Jezreel Valley Regional Council. In 2024 it had a population of 2,154.

== History ==
The village was established in the summer of 2000. The architect and entrepreneur of the village, as part of the Galilee Progress, was Tzibi Springer, who took over the tasks of planning, and managing the construction of the village after the Housing Ministry abandoned the project. Shimshit was named after the nearby archaeological tell.

Shimshit's admissions committee reviews all potential new residents and prevents Arabs from living in the community.

Most of the streets of Shimshit are named after precious stones or after water sources.

== Facilities ==
The village has an elementary school named "Reim" ('Friends'). as well as kindergartens. Children from the village generally attend high school at the Ha'Emek HaMaaravi school in kibbutz Yifat.

There is a leisure centre including basketball courts, tennis courts, a gym, class rooms, a dance studio, indoor swimming pool and a beach volleyball court.

The community is surrounded by a network of pedestrian and cycle trails.
