= Adi, Israel =

Adi: עדי (Hebrew)
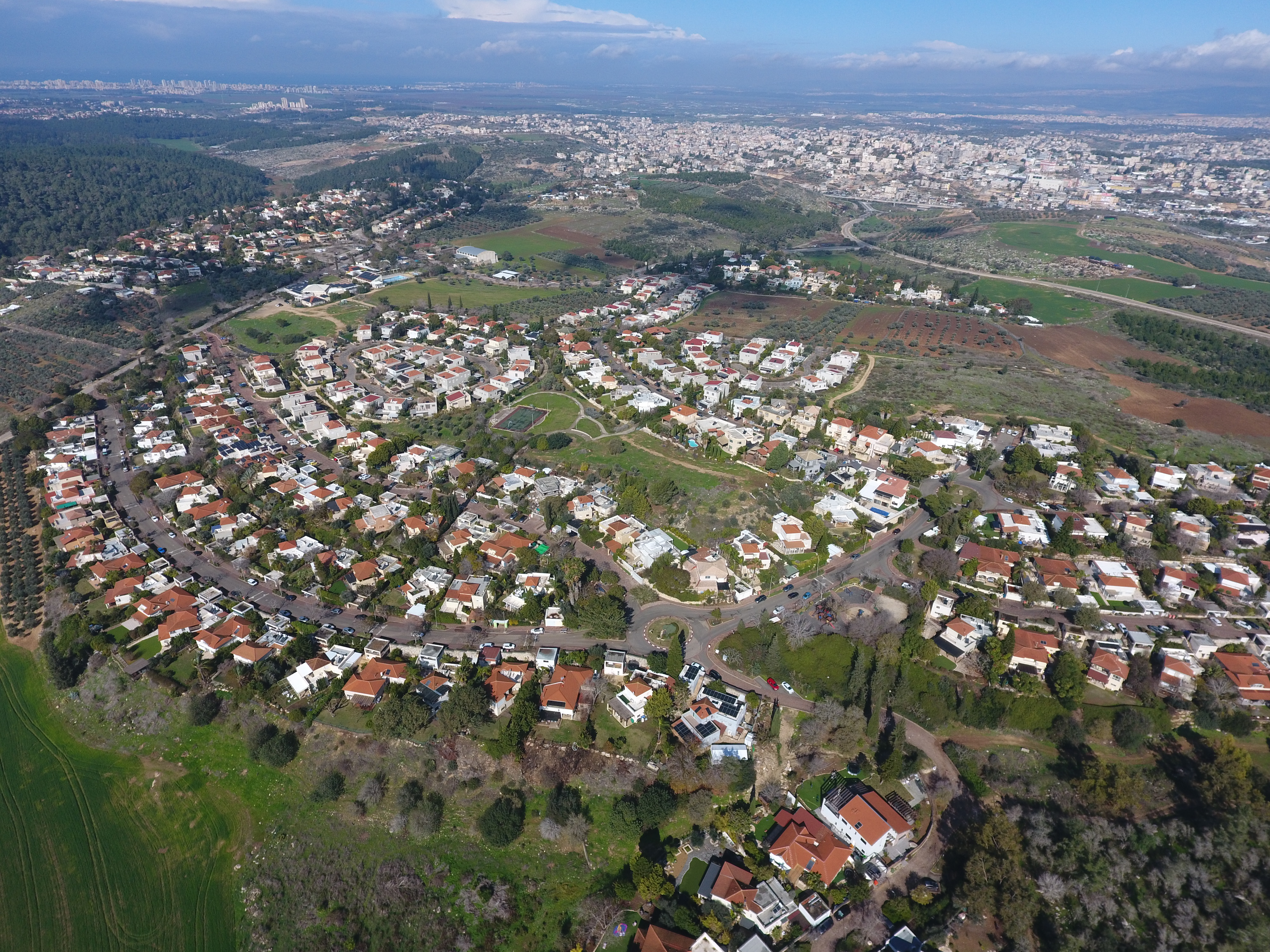
- Etymology: Ornament
- Location within Northwest Israel Location within Israel
- Coordinates: 32°47′0″N 35°10′26″E
- Country: Israel
- District: Northern
- Subdistrict: Jezreel
- Council: Jezreel Valley
- Affiliation: Hitahdut HaIkarim
- Founded: 1980
- Founder: Sabras and Soviet immigrants
- Population (2024): 1,771
- Website: www.adi.org.il

Adi (Hebrew: עדי, lit. 'Ornament') is a community settlement in northern Israel. Located near Shefa-'Amr, it falls under the jurisdiction of Jezreel Valley Regional Council. In 2024 it had a population of 1,771.

Adi is named after the archaeological site Tel Hali (Tel 'Alil) located at the Arab village of Ras Ali, 2 km to the southwest. "Adi" and "hali" both mean "adornment". Tel Hali may be the site of biblical Hali mentioned in Joshua 19:25.

The village was established in 1980 by native born Israelis and immigrants from the Soviet Union as part of the "Lookouts in the Galilee" plan.

== Notable residents ==
- Aviv Kochavi
