= HaSolelim =

- Etymology: The Road Builders
- Location within Jezreel Valley region of Israel Location within Israel
- Coordinates: 32°45′1″N 35°14′16″E
- Country: Israel
- District: Northern
- Subdistrict: Jezreel
- Council: Jezreel Valley
- Affiliation: HaOved HaTzioni
- Founded: 1949
- Founder: Maccabi Hatzair Members
- Population (2024): 965

HaSolelim (Hebrew: הַסּוֹלְלִים, lit. 'The Road Builders') is a kibbutz in northern Israel. Located near Kiryat Tiv'on, Nazareth and Shefa-'Amr, it falls under the jurisdiction of Jezreel Valley Regional Council. In 2024 it had a population of 965.

== Etymology ==
Initially named Tzippori B after the ancient site located nearby, the village was later renamed "HaSolelim" ('the Road Builders') with the name symbolising the wishes of the founders to pave the way for new settlements in the Land of Israel.

== History ==
The nearby Palestinian town of Saffuriya (which occupied the same site as the Jewish town of Sepphoris in classical antiquity) had been almost emptied of its 4,000 inhabitants in July 1948. By early January 1949 about 500 inhabitants had returned, but "neighbouring settlements coveted Saffuriya lands". The "Northern Front" ordered their eviction, which was carried out on 7 January 1949. From February the same year, the land near Saffuriya was distributed to neighbouring Jewish villages, one of which was HaSolelim.

The kibbutz HaSolelim was established in July 1949 by members of the Maccabi Hatzair movement and by members of the General Zionist Movement in America. HaSolelim is located west of the Saffuriya site.
