= Alon HaGalil =

Community settlement in northern Israel

Alon HaGalil: אלון הגליל (Hebrew)

Hebrew transcription(s)
  - Official: Allon HaGalil
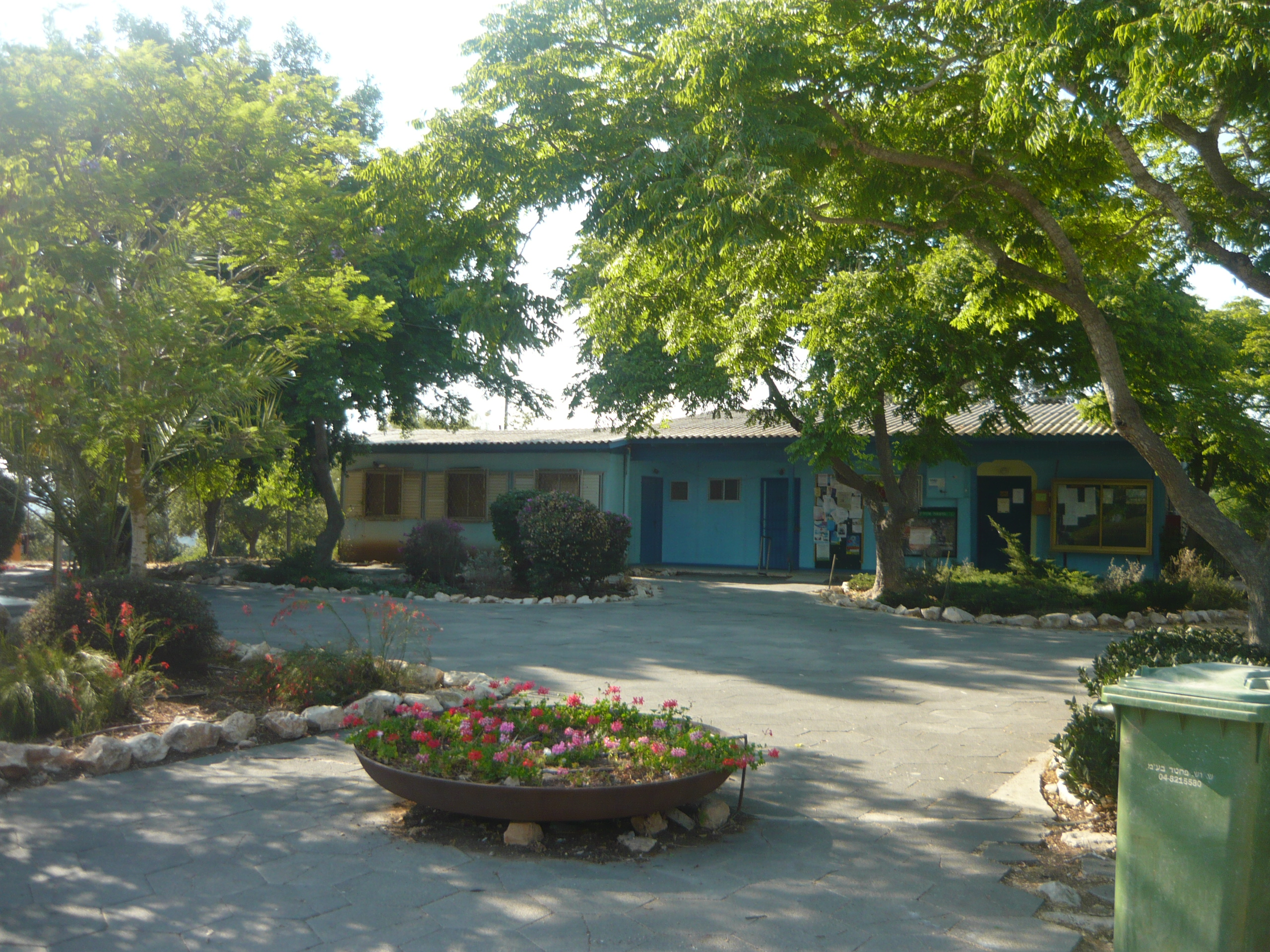
- Etymology: Oak of the Galilee
- Location within Haifa region of Israel Location within Israel
- Coordinates: 32°45′26″N 35°13′14″E
- Country: Israel
- District: Northern
- Subdistrict: Jezreel
- Council: Jezreel Valley
- Affiliation: Moshavim Movement
- Founded: 1980
- Founder: Moshavim Movement
- Population (2024): 1,058
- Website: alonhagalil.org.il

Alon HaGalil (Hebrew: אלון הגליל, lit. 'Oak of the Galilee') is a community settlement in northern Israel. Located in the Lower Galilee, it falls under the jurisdiction of Jezreel Valley Regional Council. In 2024 it had a population of 1,058.

Alon Hagalil was founded in 1980 on land that had previously belonged to the depopulated Palestinian village of Saffuriya (which had been a Jewish city during classical antiquity) before the 1948 Arab-Israeli War. Founded as a moshav, it converted to a community settlement in 1986, but remains a member of the Moshavim Movement.

== Notable residents ==
- Erel Halevi
