= Ilut =

Ilut: עִלּוּט, עילוט; عيلوط
- Local council (from 1991)
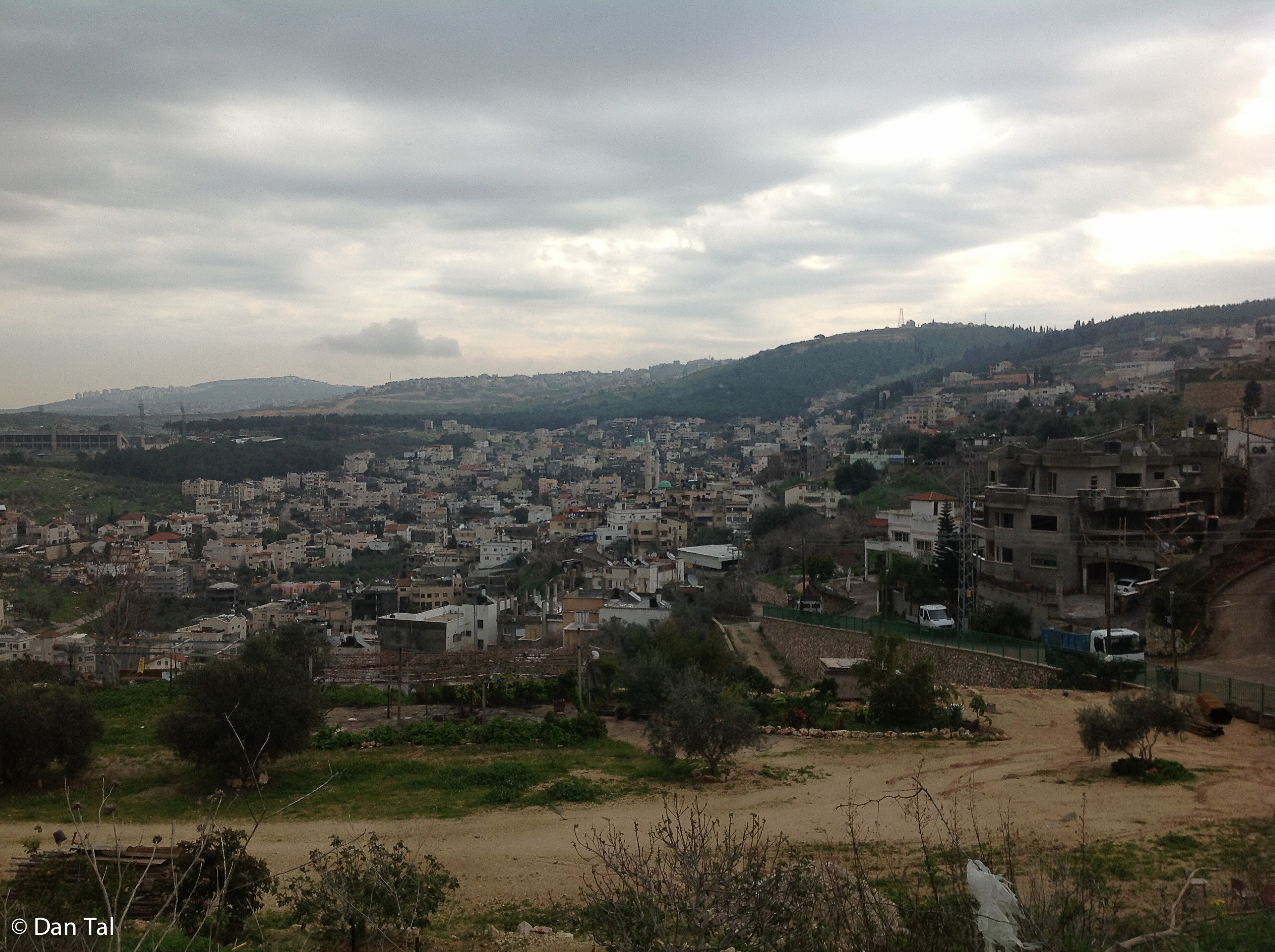
- Ilut

- Location within Jezreel Valley region of Israel
- Coordinates: 32°43′00″N 35°15′45″E
- Grid position: 174/235 PAL
- Country: Israel
- District: Northern
- Subdistrict: Jezreel
- Natural Region: Nazareth-Tir'an Mountains

Government
  - Head of Municipality: Ibrahim Abu Ras

Area
  - Total: 3,051 dunams (3.051 km^{2}; 1.178 sq mi)

Population (2024)
  - Total: 9,077
  - Density: 2,975/km^{2} (7,705/sq mi)

Ethnicity
  - Arabs: 99.99%
  - Others: 0.01%
- Name meaning: possibly from the name of a tree

Ilut, also spelt ʿAilut (Arabic: عيلوط; Hebrew: עִלּוּט), is an Arab local council in the Northern District of Israel. It was declared a local council in 1991. In 2024 its population was 9,077.

Ilut is located to the northwest of Nazareth. The town is home to the Ilut Stadium, the home ground of Maccabi Ahi Nazareth.

== History ==
Sherds from the Middle Bronze Age II and the Iron Age have been found here.

A burial cave from the Persian era have been excavated and Hellenistic (3rd–2nd centuries BCE), remains have also been found here.

Historical geographer, Samuel Klein (1886–1940), suggested identifying the village with the 2nd century town known as ‘Ayṯoh-lo, mentioned in rabbinical sources and home to one of the 24 priestly families that settled in the Galilee after the Bar Kokhba revolt.

A fish breeding pond, made in Roman era, and in use until the late Byzantine (5th–6th centuries CE) era have been excavated in the centre of Ilut, near a perennial spring. It was probably used for raising St. Peter's fish. Other building remains, pottery and coins have also been found dating from the Roman and Byzantine eras.

Remains from the Umayyad (7th–8th centuries CE) Fatimid (10th–11th centuries CE) Abbasid Crusader and Mamluk (13th–15th centuries CE) eras have also been found here.

=== Ottoman Empire ===
In 1517, the village was included in the Ottoman Empire with the rest of Palestine, and in the 1596 tax-records it appeared as 'Aylut, located in the Nahiya of Tabariyya of the Liwa of Safad. The population was 9 households, all Muslim. They paid a tax rate of 25% on agricultural products, which included wheat, barley, fruit trees, goats and beehives, in addition to occasional revenues; a total of 200 Akçe. A map from Napoleon's invasion of 1799 by Pierre Jacotin showed the place as an unnamed village.

In 1838, it was noted as a Muslim and Greek Christian village in the Nazareth district.

In 1859, the village had a population of 180 souls.

In 1875 Victor Guérin found it to have no more than 200 inhabitants. The village was situated in a valley and on the lower flanks of a mound. Some gardens surrounded it, planted with fig and olive trees and surrounded by a cactus hedge. He further noticed, near a Oualy, the site of an old church which had been completely razed. There were only five or six sections of limestone columns lying on the ground. As for the Oualy, it seemed to have been built with materials from the church. The Moslems there worshipped inside it a tomb dedicated to Neby Louth; the same person whose tomb was found in Bani Na'im.

A population list from about 1887 showed that Ailut had about 350 Muslim inhabitants.

=== British Mandate ===
At the time of the 1922 census of Palestine ʿAilut had a population of 501, all Muslims, increasing in the 1931 census to 834, still all Muslims, in a total of 165 houses.

In the 1945 statistics the population was 1,310, all Muslims, while the total land area was 17,557 dunams, according to an official land and population survey. Of this, 370 were allocated for plantations and irrigable land, 7,501 for cereals, while 30 dunams were classified as built-up areas.

=== Israel ===
In 2013, an archaeological survey of the southernmost part of the site was conducted by Edna Amos on behalf of the Israel Antiquities Authority (IAA).

== Voting Patterns ==
In the 2022 election, 93 percent of voters in Ilut voted for the Arab parties, while 3 percent voted for the parties of the center-left coalition led by Yair Lapid and 3 percent voted for the parties of the right-wing coalition led by Benjamin Netanyahu. Among the voters for the Arab parties, 39 percent voted for the Hadash–Ta'al list, while 34 percent voted for Ra'am and 27 percent voted for Balad.

In the 2026 election, 98 percent of voters in Ilut voted for the Arab parties, while 1 percent voted for the parties of the center-left coalition led by Gadi Eisenkot and 0.4 percent voted for the parties of the right-wing coalition led by Benjamin Netanyahu. Among the voters for the Arab parties, 70 percent voted for the Joint List, while 30 percent voted for Ra'am. Voter turnout increased 86 percent from the 2022 election.

== See also ==
- Arab localities in Israel

== Bibliography ==
- Alexandre, Yardenna (2005-04-11). "Ilut Final Report". Hadashot Arkheologiyot – Excavations and Surveys in Israel (117).
- Barron, J.B., ed. (1923). Palestine: Report and General Abstracts of the Census of 1922. Government of Palestine.
- Conder, C.R.; Kitchener, H.H. (1881). The Survey of Western Palestine: Memoirs of the Topography, Orography, Hydrography, and Archaeology. Vol. 1. London: Committee of the Palestine Exploration Fund.
- Dalali-Amos, Edna (2009-02-15). "'Illut Final Report". Hadashot Arkheologiyot – Excavations and Surveys in Israel (121).
- Dalali-Amos, Edna; Tepper, Y. (2017-03-27). "'Illut". Hadashot Arkheologiyot – Excavations and Surveys in Israel (129).
- Dalali-Amos, Edna (2017-12-03). "ʽIllut Final Report". Hadashot Arkheologiyot – Excavations and Surveys in Israel (129).
- Department of Statistics (1945). Village Statistics, April, 1945. Government of Palestine.
- Guérin, V. (1880). Description Géographique Historique et Archéologique de la Palestine (in French). Vol. 3: Galilee, pt. 1. Paris: L'Imprimerie Nationale.
- Hadawi, S. (1970). Village Statistics of 1945: A Classification of Land and Area ownership in Palestine. Palestine Liberation Organization Research Center.
- Hütteroth, W.-D.; Abdulfattah, K. (1977). Historical Geography of Palestine, Transjordan and Southern Syria in the Late 16th Century. Erlanger Geographische Arbeiten, Sonderband 5. Erlangen, Germany: Vorstand der Fränkischen Geographischen Gesellschaft. ISBN 3-920405-41-2.
- Karmon, Y. (1960). "An Analysis of Jacotin's Map of Palestine" (PDF). Israel Exploration Journal. 10 (3, 4): 155–173, 244–253. Archived from the original (PDF) on 2019-12-22.
- Mills, E., ed. (1932). Census of Palestine 1931. Population of Villages, Towns and Administrative Areas. Jerusalem: Government of Palestine.
- Palmer, E.H. (1881). The Survey of Western Palestine: Arabic and English Name Lists Collected During the Survey by Lieutenants Conder and Kitchener, R. E. Transliterated and Explained by E.H. Palmer. Committee of the Palestine Exploration Fund.
- Rhode, H. (1979). Administration and Population of the Sancak of Safed in the Sixteenth Century. Columbia University. Archived from the original on 2020-03-01.
- Robinson, E.; Smith, E. (1841). Biblical Researches in Palestine, Mount Sinai and Arabia Petraea: A Journal of Travels in the year 1838. Vol. 3. Boston: Crocker & Brewster.
- Schumacher, G. (1888). "Population list of the Liwa of Akka". Quarterly Statement - Palestine Exploration Fund. 20: 169–191.
- Shalev, Yiftah (2016-02-25). "'Illut Final Report". Hadashot Arkheologiyot – Excavations and Surveys in Israel (128).
