= Nahum Sarig =

Israeli Palmach and IDF commander (1914–1999)

- נחום שריג
- Sarig in 1948
- Born: Nahum Weisfish; 25 November 1914; Jerusalem, Ottoman Empire
- Died: 27 July 1999 (aged 84); Beit HaShita, Israel
- Burial place: Beit HaShita, Israel
- Military career
- Allegiance: Israel
- Branch: Haganah; Palmach; Israel Defense Forces
- Rank: Lieutenant colonel (Sgan Aluf)
- Nickname: "Sergei"
- Commands: Commander, Palmach 1st Battalion; Commander, Palmach Special Units; Commander, Negev Brigade
- Conflicts: 1948 Arab–Israeli War; Operation Yoav; Operation Horev; Operation Uvda
- Memorials: Nahum Sarig Street, Beersheba

Head of the Gilboa Regional Council
- In office 1977–1985
- Preceded by: Moshe Ben-Zvi
- Succeeded by: Avraham Yariv

Secretary-General of HaKibbutz HaMeuhad
- In office 1967–1972

Nahum ("Sergei") Sarig (born Weisfish; 25 November 1914 (Note: The Palmach Information Center gives his year of birth as 1915 and describes his family as fifth-generation Jerusalemites from the "Kerem" neighborhood, whereas the Gilboa Regional Council gives 1914.) – 27 July 1999) was one of the most prominent commanders of the Palmach and the commander of the Negev Brigade during the 1948 Arab–Israeli War. After the war he left the Israel Defense Forces and returned to his kibbutz, Beit HaShita. He later served as secretary of the HaKibbutz HaMeuhad movement and as head of the Gilboa Regional Council.

== Biography ==
Sarig was born in Jerusalem, on the edge of the Mea Shearim neighborhood, to Shraga and Yocheved Weisfish, a Haredi family that had lived in Jerusalem for seven generations and descended from Rabbi Nachum Levi of Szadek. His father left for the United States to earn a living, and Nahum grew up without him. From an early age he was drawn to the activities of the Haganah and to the secular youth movements. As a youth he joined the HaMahanot HaOlim movement, and through it went on to settle the land with the "Kvutzat HaHugim" group that founded Kibbutz Beit HaShita. He married Tikva, the daughter of Rabbi Dr. Yosef Halevi Zeliger, founder of the Tachkemoni school; she later became known as the writer Tikva Sarig.

When the Palmach was founded in 1941, Sarig joined it and served in Company A under the command of Yigal Allon, first as a platoon commander and later as commander of the company. In late 1944, during the initial organization of the Palmach companies into battalions, he was appointed commander of the 1st Battalion. He commanded the Atlit Detainee Camp Raid – the operation to free the illegal immigrants held at the detention camp on the night of 9–10 October 1945, as well as the bombings of the radar stations along the Mediterranean coast which were set up to detect immigrant ships in 1946 and 1947. He was subsequently appointed commander of the Palmach's 4th Battalion, which at the time effectively served as the headquarters of the Palmach's special units.

=== In the Israeli War of Independence ===
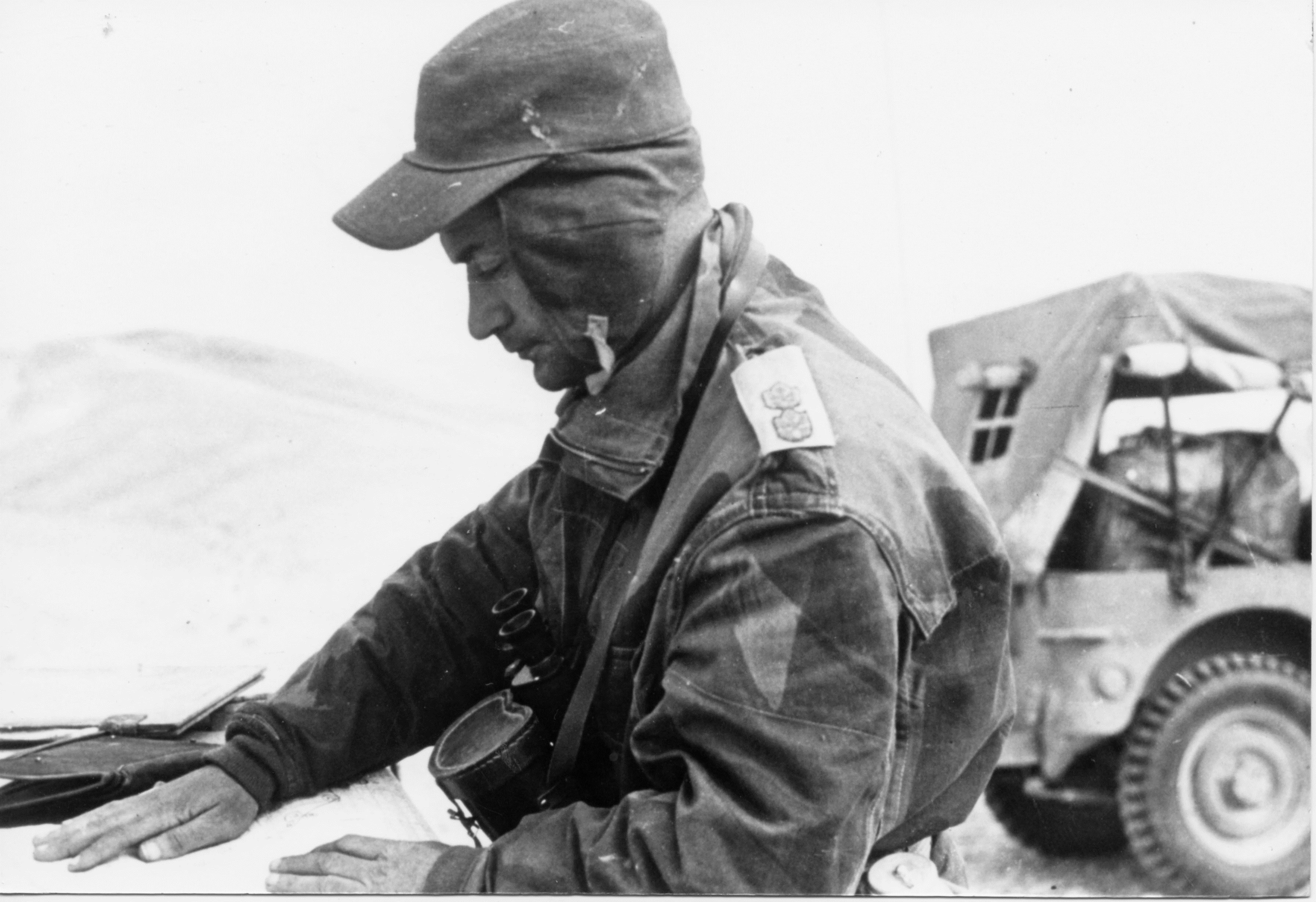
Nahum Sarig, commander of the Negev Brigade, during Operation Horev

With the outbreak of the 1948 Arab–Israeli War, Sarig was given responsibility for Palmach operations in the Negev. In March 1948 the Negev Brigade, the first Palmach brigade, was organized and he took command of it, (Note: On 25 March 1948, Ben-Gurion noted in his diary that Nahum Sarig had never been appointed commander of the Negev Brigade. Likewise, in the list of appointments issued by the Ministry of Defense on 30 June 1948, Eliyahu Ben-Hur is named as the brigade's commander. The matter is bound up with the question of subordinating the Palmach and its units to the direct command of the IDF General Staff.) remaining its commander throughout the war until his discharge in 1949. During the Egyptian invasion and the heavy fighting around the Jewish settlements in the Negev, Sarig opposed evacuating women and children from the besieged settlements, fearing that such a step would undermine the settlements' ability to hold out.

The three major operations in which the Negev Brigade took part under his command were Operation Yoav, in which the brigade's forces, together with other units, broke the siege of the Negev and captured Beersheba; Operation Horev, in which the brigade seized the Bir Asluj–Auja al-Hafir line and parts of the eastern Sinai Peninsula; and Operation Uvda, in which the southern Negev was captured as far as Eilat.

When the brigade reached the shores of the Red Sea on 10 March 1949, Sarig took part in the raising of the Ink Flag at Umm Rashrash. Finding that his troops had no flag with them as Operation Uvda drew to a close, he ordered his soldiers to improvise one, and the brigade's secretary made a flag from a white sheet and ink. Sarig handed the flag to company commander Avraham Adan ("Bren") and ordered him to advance to Umm Rashrash and raise it there; Adan's force crossed through Egyptian territory on the way, and Adan climbed the flagpole at the abandoned police station to hoist the flag. Sarig himself made his way to the site separately with two jeeps. (Note: Hebrew-language accounts add that Sarig followed Adan across the Egyptian border with the two jeeps, at the risk of a military incident, and picked up Adan and two of his soldiers so that they would be the first to reach Umm Rashrash.)

=== After the war ===
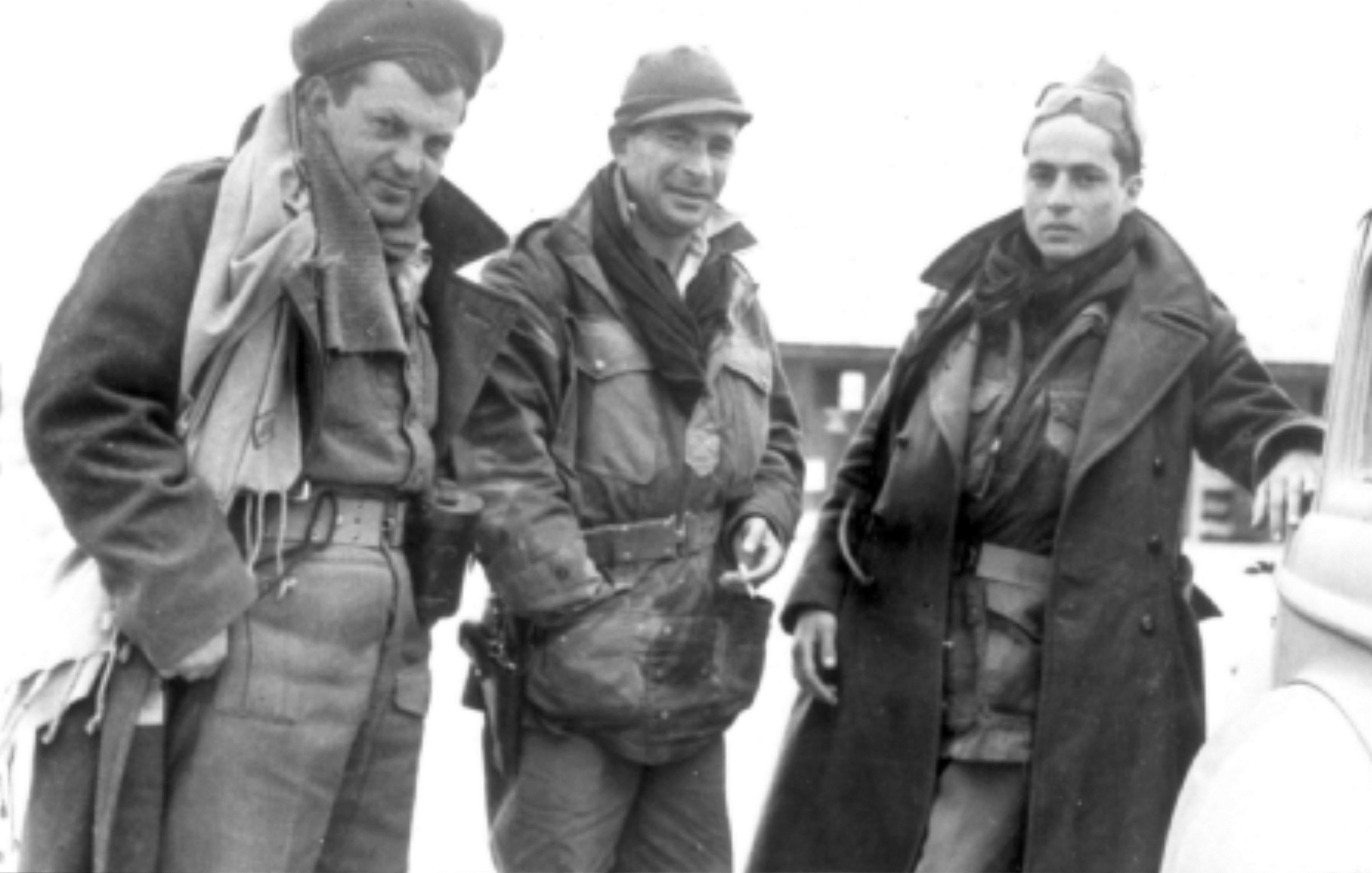
In captured Nitzana after Operation Horev. From right: Dani Agmon, Nahum Sarig, Avi Zakai

At the end of the war he was discharged from the IDF and returned to Kibbutz Beit HaShita. In 1962 he was made an honorary citizen of Beersheba.

His positions in the following years included secretary of the HaKibbutz HaMeuhad movement (1967–1972) and head of the Gilboa Regional Council, where he promoted the building of roads, electricity and clinics in the council's Arab villages. He also served ten terms as secretary of his kibbutz.

After the Yom Kippur War, in which his son, the poet and composer Yosef Sarig, was killed on the Golan Heights, he was the principal initiator of a volunteer movement then known as the "Blue Brigade", which worked at IDF bases to rehabilitate the army's logistics system. He also initiated another volunteer movement, "Avitz", to help fortify the settlements of northern Israel.

Another of his sons is Ran Sarig, commander of the 179th Brigade in the Yom Kippur War and later a deputy division commander. Sarig also had a daughter, Ruth, and two younger sons, Eyal and Yitzhak. (Note: The Palmach Information Center states that he had five children.)

In 1984 he was among the founders of the Palmach Generation Association (Dor HaPalmach), whose aim was to commemorate the Palmach's activities, and he served as its chairman until his death.

Nahum Sarig died on July, 27 1999 and was buried beside his wife Tikva at his kibbutz, Beit HaShita.

== Commemoration ==
The city of Beersheba named a street after him in the Ramot neighborhood.

An observation tower in Ramot Yissachar, above Kibbutz Beit HaShita, is named after him.
