= Al-Murassas =

Al-Murassas المرصص
- Etymology: the place of the rubble
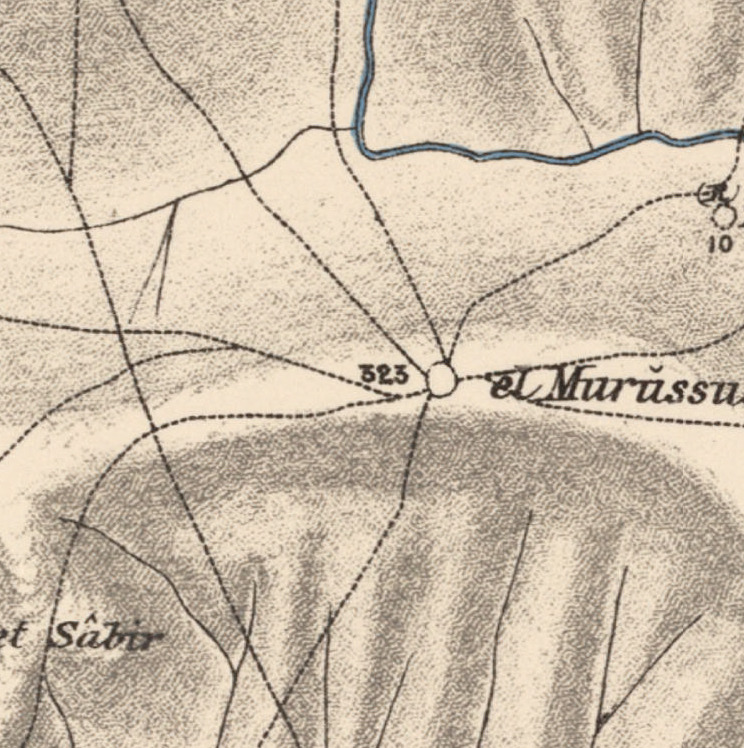
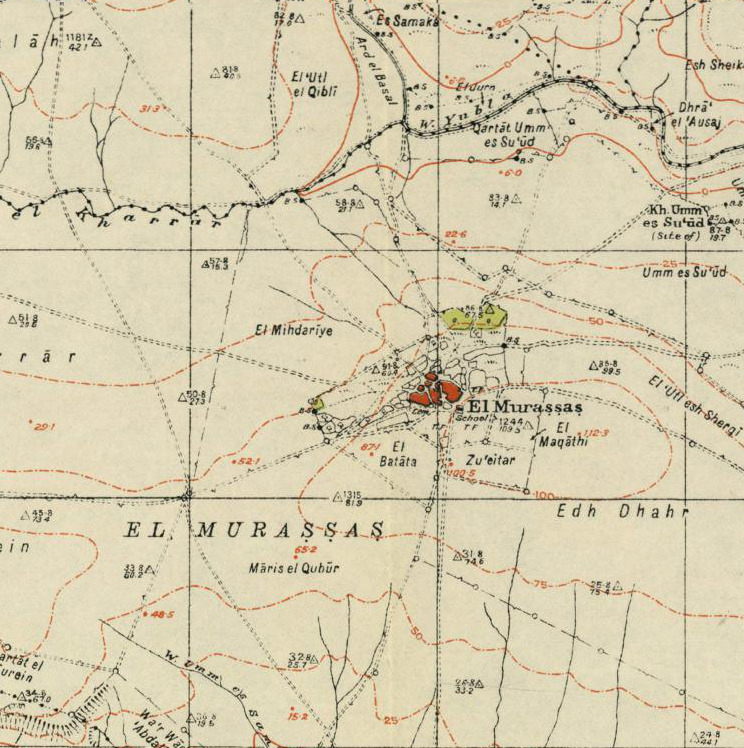
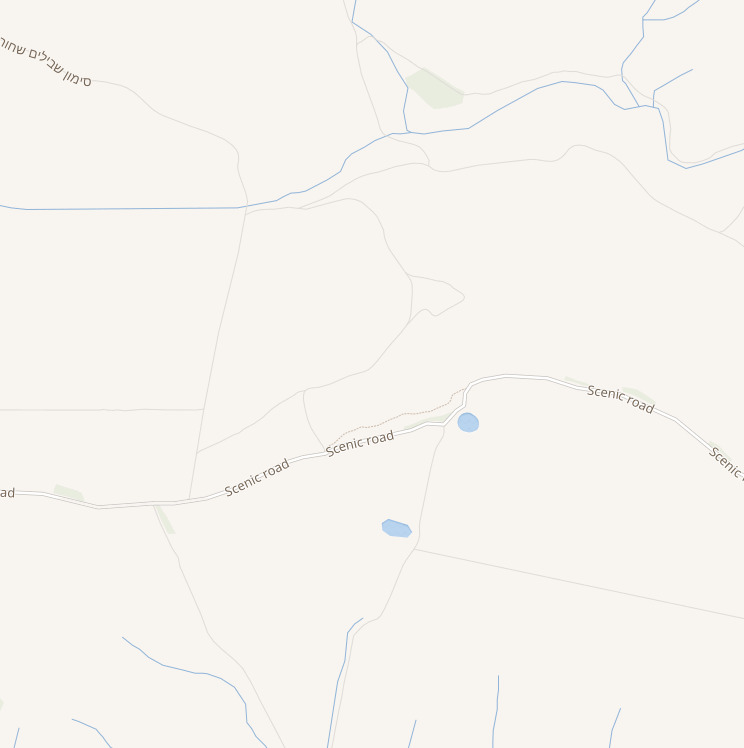
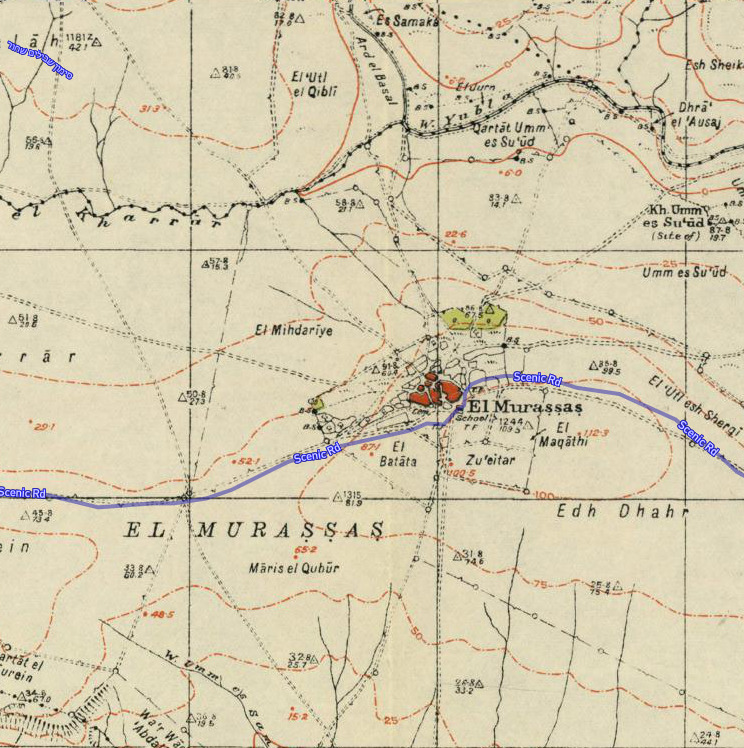
- 1870s map 1940s map modern map 1940s with modern overlay map A series of historical maps of the area around Al-Murassas (click the buttons)

- Location within Mandatory Palestine
- Coordinates: 32°33′38″N 35°28′25″E
- Palestine grid: 195/218
- Geopolitical entity: Mandatory Palestine
- Subdistrict: Baysan
- Date of depopulation: May 16, 1948

Population (1945)
  - Total: 460
- Cause(s) of depopulation: Influence of nearby town's fall

Al-Murassas (Arabic: المرصص), was a Palestinian Arab village in the District of Baysan. It was depopulated by the Israel Defense Forces during the 1948 War on May 16, 1948. The village was attacked as part of Operation Gideon.

== History ==
In 1596 Al-Murassas was a farm paying taxes to the Ottoman authorities.

Johann Ludwig Burckhardt mentions passing the village (which he called Meraszrasz) during his travels in the early 19th century.

In 1838, el-Murussus was noted as part of the Jenin District.

In 1870/1871 (1288 AH), an Ottoman census listed the village in the nahiya (sub-district) of Shafa al-Shamali.

In 1882 the PEF's Survey of Western Palestine (SWP) described the it as "A small village on high ground, entirely built of mud, and standing amid plough-land. The water supply appears to come from the valley beneath (Wady Yebla)."

=== British Mandate era ===
In the 1922 census of Palestine, conducted by the Mandatory Palestine authorities, Murassas had a population of 319 Muslims, increasing in the 1931 census to 381; 375 Muslims and 6 Christians, in a total of 89 houses.

The village had a population of 460 in the 1945 statistics; 450 Muslims and 10 Christians, while the total land area was 14,477 dunams. Of this, Arabs used 16 dunums for plantations and irrigable land, 9,897 for cereals, while 16 dunums were classified built–up (urban) land.

=== 1948, aftermath ===
On June 6, 1948, a platoon from the Israeli Barak brigade raided Danna, Al-Bira, Kafra, Yubla, Jabbul, and Al-Murassas. They would first fire "a few two-inch mortar rounds into its centre", then move in. Al-Murassas was found to be empty. The destruction of Al-Murassas was later criticised by a veteran local Israeli leader, who thought that the villagers would have been willing to cooperate with the Yishuv and "allocate part of their lands for our settlements".

In July, 1948, The Israeli kibbutz Beit HaShita took over 5,400 dunams of land from the newly depopulated Palestinian villages of Yubla and Al-Murassas.

In 1992 the village site was described: "The village site is part of an agricultural area that is exploited by the settlements of Sde Nachum and Beyt ha-Shitta. The only structures on the area are telephone poles and a small shed. A small tell on the site, surrounded by plowed fields, is littered with rubble."

== Bibliography ==
- Barron, J.B., ed. (1923). Palestine: Report and General Abstracts of the Census of 1922. Government of Palestine.
- Burckhardt, J.L. (1822). Travels in Syria and the Holy Land. London: J. Murray.
- Conder, C.R.; Kitchener, H. H. (1882). The Survey of Western Palestine: Memoirs of the Topography, Orography, Hydrography, and Archaeology. Vol. 2. London: Committee of the Palestine Exploration Fund.
- Department of Statistics (1945). Village Statistics, April, 1945. Government of Palestine.
- Fischbach, Michael R. (2012). Records of dispossession: Palestinian refugee property and the Arab–Israeli conflict (Illustrated ed.). Columbia University Press. ISBN 978-0-231-12978-7.
- Hadawi, S. (1970). Village Statistics of 1945: A Classification of Land and Area ownership in Palestine. Palestine Liberation Organization Research Center. Archived from the original on 2018-12-08.
- Khalidi, W. (1992). All That Remains: The Palestinian Villages Occupied and Depopulated by Israel in 1948. Washington D.C.: Institute for Palestine Studies. ISBN 0-88728-224-5.
- Mills, E., ed. (1932). Census of Palestine 1931. Population of Villages, Towns and Administrative Areas. Jerusalem: Government of Palestine.
- Morris, B. (2004). The Birth of the Palestinian Refugee Problem Revisited. Cambridge University Press. ISBN 978-0-521-00967-6.
- Palmer, E.H. (1881). The Survey of Western Palestine: Arabic and English Name Lists Collected During the Survey by Lieutenants Conder and Kitchener, R. E. Transliterated and Explained by E.H. Palmer. Committee of the Palestine Exploration Fund.
- Robinson, E.; Smith, E. (1841). Biblical Researches in Palestine, Mount Sinai and Arabia Petraea: A Journal of Travels in the year 1838. Vol. 3. Boston: Crocker & Brewster.
