= Ovda =

Uvda, also popularly known as Ovda (wikt:עובדה), may refer to:

== Israel ==
- Operation Uvda, a 1948 military operation establishing "facts on the ground"
- Uvda (Israel), a region in the southern Negev desert
- Uvda (TV program), an Israeli investigative and current affairs programme
- Ovda Airport, a military air base in the Uvda region of southern Israel

== Elsewhere ==
- Ovda Regio, a crustal plateau on Venus
