= Romani ambush =

1973 battle of the Yom Kippur War

Coordinates: 31.0218°N 32.6678°E

Romani Egyptian commando ambush
- Part of the Yom Kippur War
Date	October 7, 1973
Location	Northern section of the Sinai front, near the town of Romani
Result	Israeli victory

Belligerents
Egypt	Israel

Commanders and leaders
Captain Hamdy Shalaby	Colonel Nathan Nir

Strength
183rd Battalion (Sa'ka)	162nd Division

Casualties and losses
70 killed	10 killed 20 wounded

The Romani Egyptian commando ambush was a battle waged on the morning of the second day of the Yom Kippur War, between the Egyptian military and the Israel Defense Forces in the northern section of the Sinai front, near the town of Romani. It was the Egyptians' most significant attempt to delay the arrival of the IDF's reserve forces at the front. It was also the first battle of the war in which IDF reserve forces took part and the first battle waged by the IDF's 162 Division.

== Sources ==
- Avraham Adan,On both sides of the suez, Jerusalem: idanim, 1979
- Heitan Haber, Zeev Schiff, Lexicon of the Yom Kippur War, Or Yehoda: Zemora-Bitan, Devir, 2003
- Elyashiv Shimshi,The power to decide: the division commanders on the battlefield, Tel Aviv: Ministry of Defense, 2007.
