= Shatta =

Historic Palestinian village

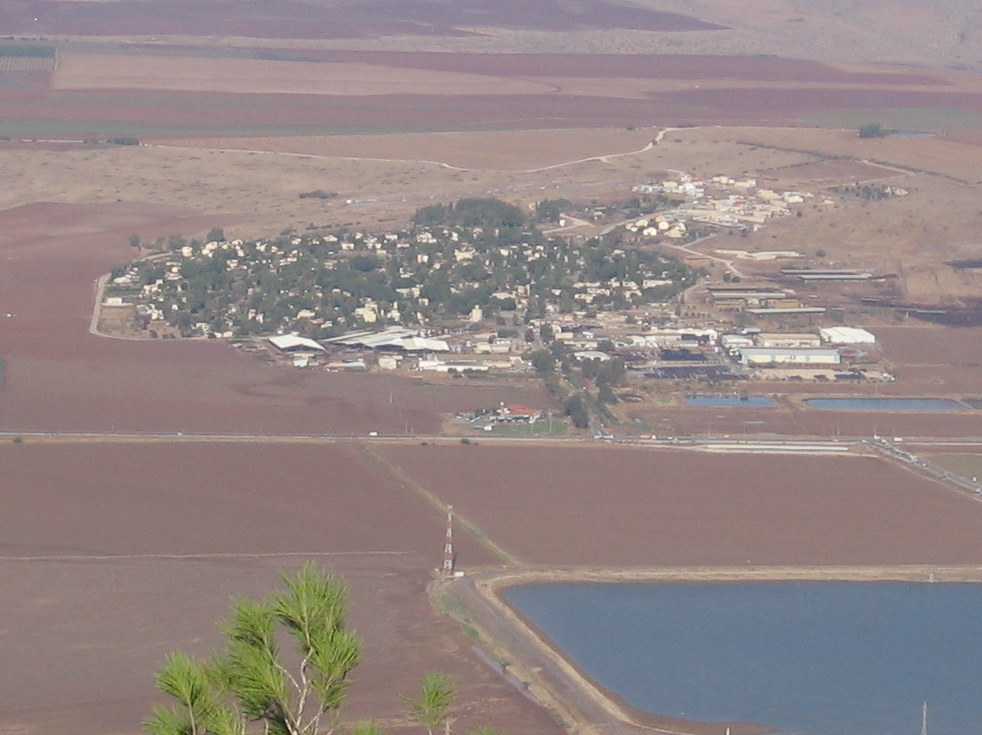
Kibbutz Bet HaShita

Shatta (Arabic: شطّة, romanized: Shaṭṭah), was a Palestinian village in Beit She'an Valley, north-west of the city of Bisan. During the British Mandate period, it was replaced by kibbutz Beit HaShita.

== Etymology ==
According the Edward H. Palmer, the name probably means 'river bank'.

== History ==
The site's early history is reflected in Byzantine pottery and coins that were found at the site.

=== Ottoman period ===
Geograper Yehuda Karmon, suggested that Shatta appear on the map Pierre Jacotin compiled in 1799, but misnamed as Naim.

While travelling in the region in 1838, Edward Robinson noted Shutta as a village in the general area of Tamra, while during his travels in 1852 he noted it as being a village north of the Jalud.

When Victor Guérin visited in 1870, he found here "a good many silos cut in the ground and serving as underground granaries to the families of the village", and "The women have to go for water to the canal of 'Ain Jalud – marked on the map as the Wady Jalud."

In 1870/1871 (1288 AH), an Ottoman census listed the village in the nahiya (sub-district) of Shafa al-Shamali.

In 1881, the Palestine Exploration Fund's Survey of Western Palestine described Shutta as a small adobe village on rising ground, surrounded by hedges of prickly pear and plough-land.

=== British Mandate era ===
In the 1922 census of Palestine, Shutta had a population of 280; 277 Muslims and 3 Orthodox Christians, decreasing in the 1931 census to 255; 2 Jews, 3 Christians and 250 Muslims, in a total of 85 houses.

The land of the kibbutz, part of the village land of Shutta including the village itself, was purchased by the Palestine Land Development Company from its Arab owners in 1931. The tenants contested the purchase, claiming to be the rightful owners, but the Bisan Civil Court ruled against them. The fate of the tenants and workers, numbering more than 200, became a matter of dispute between the government, the sellers, and the buyers. The Jewish Agency maintained that the terms of sale were for the land to be delivered free of residents, while the main seller Raja Ra'is apparently made use of loopholes in the law to provide the tenants with compensation below that to which they were entitled. The case led to a 1932 amendment of the law to better protect evicted tenants. In 2015, a grandchild of kibbutz residents, Jasmine Donahaye, published Losing Israel in which she expressed her disillusionment on learning of the eviction of Arabs on the founding of the kibbutz.

== Bibliography ==
- Barron, J.B., ed. (1923). Palestine: Report and General Abstracts of the Census of 1922. Government of Palestine.
- Conder, C.R.; Kitchener, H.H. (1882). The Survey of Western Palestine: Memoirs of the Topography, Orography, Hydrography, and Archaeology. Vol. 2. London: Committee of the Palestine Exploration Fund.
- Dauphin, C. (1998). La Palestine byzantine, Peuplement et Populations. BAR International Series 726 (in French). Vol. III : Catalogue. Oxford: Archeopress. ISBN 0860549054.
- Department of Statistics (1945). Village Statistics, April, 1945. Government of Palestine.
- Donahaye, Jasmine (2015). Losing Israel. Seren Books. ISBN 978-1781722527.
- Fischbach, Michael R. (2012). Records of dispossession: Palestinian refugee property and the Arab–Israeli conflict (Illustrated ed.). Columbia University Press. ISBN 978-0-231-12978-7.
- Guérin, V. (1874). Description Géographique Historique et Archéologique de la Palestine (in French). Vol. 2: Samarie, pt. 1. Paris: L'Imprimerie Nationale.
- Kark, R. (1997). "Mamlūk and Ottoman Cadastral Surveys and Early Mapping of Landed Properties in Palestine". Agricultural History. 71 (1): 46–70.
- Karmon, Y. (1960). "An Analysis of Jacotin's Map of Palestine" (PDF). Israel Exploration Journal. 10 (3, 4): 155–173, 244–253. Archived from the original (PDF) on 2019-12-22.
- Hadawi, S. (1970). Village Statistics of 1945: A Classification of Land and Area ownership in Palestine. Palestine Liberation Organization Research Center.
- Lieblich, A. (1981). Kibbutz Makom: Report From an Israeli kibbutz. Pantheon Books. ISBN 0-394-50724-X.
- Mills, E., ed. (1932). Census of Palestine 1931. Population of Villages, Towns and Administrative Areas. Jerusalem: Government of Palestine.
- Palmer, E.H. (1881). The Survey of Western Palestine: Arabic and English Name Lists Collected During the Survey by Lieutenants Conder and Kitchener, R. E. Transliterated and Explained by E.H. Palmer. Committee of the Palestine Exploration Fund.
- Robinson, E.; Smith, E. (1841). Biblical Researches in Palestine, Mount Sinai and Arabia Petraea: A Journal of Travels in the year 1838. Vol. 3. Boston: Crocker & Brewster.
- Robinson, E.; Smith, E. (1856). Later Biblical Researches in Palestine and adjacent regions: A Journal of Travels in the year 1852. London: John Murray.
- Stein, K. (1984). The Land Question in Palestine. University of North Carolina Press. ISBN 978-0-8078-4178-5.
