= Yubla =

Yubla يبلى Hubeleth
- Village
- Etymology: Kh. Yebla, the ruin of Yebla, p.n.
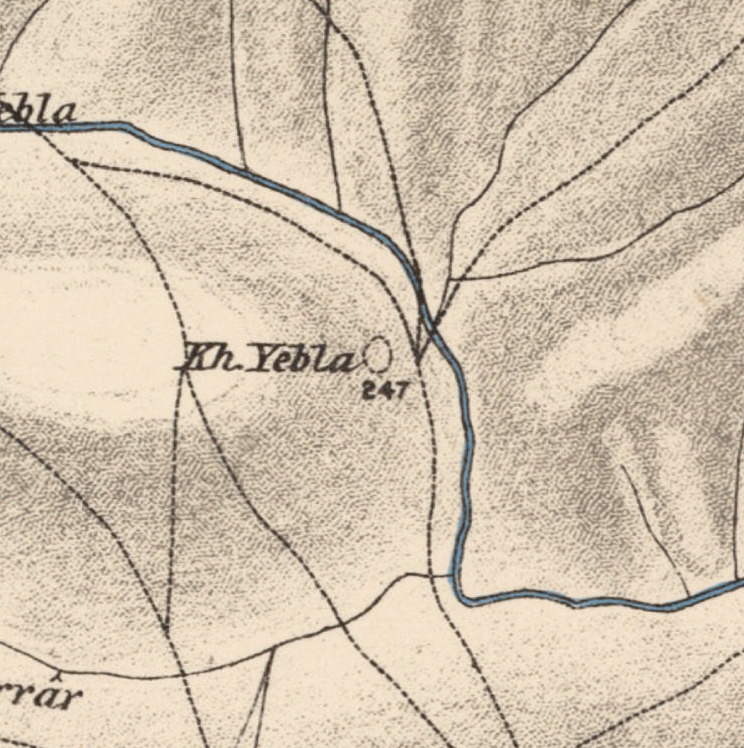
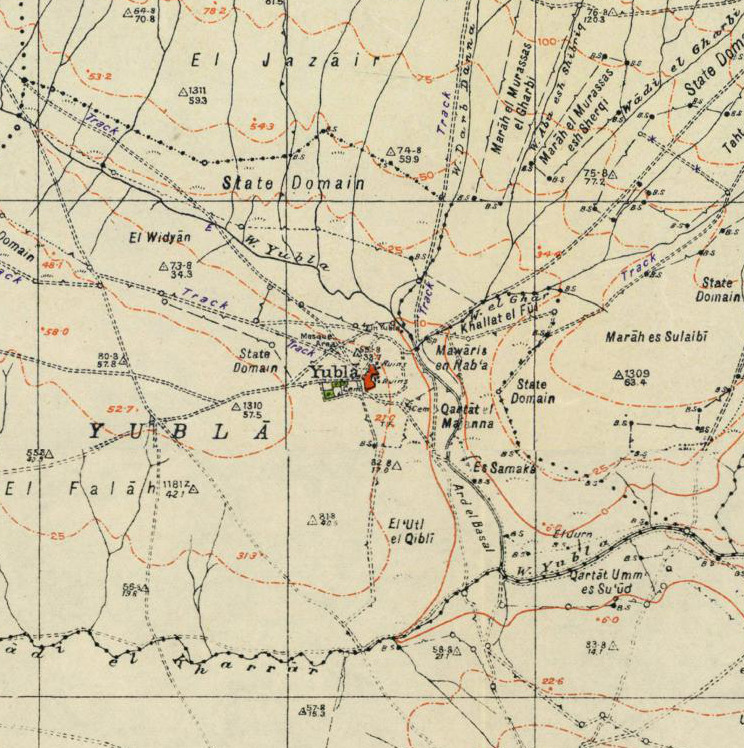
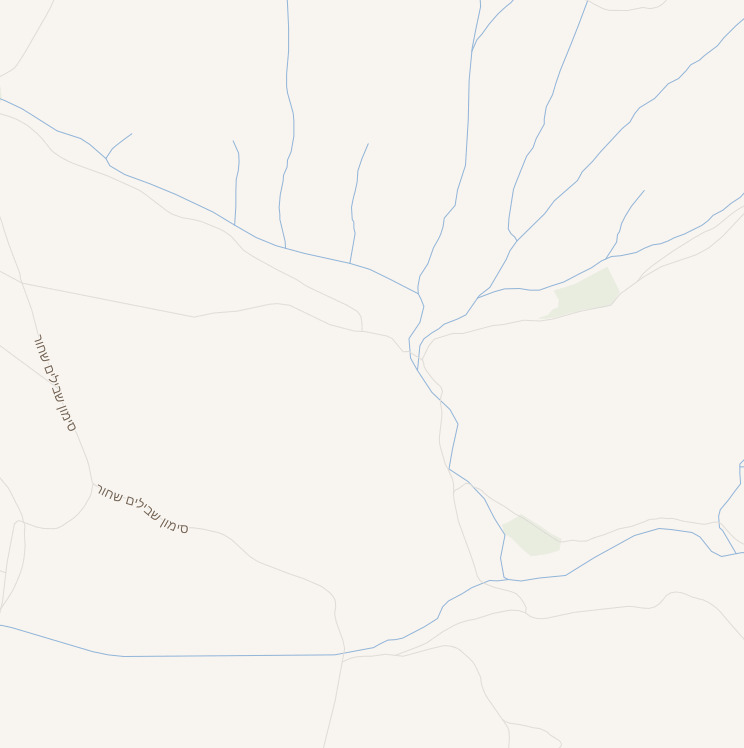
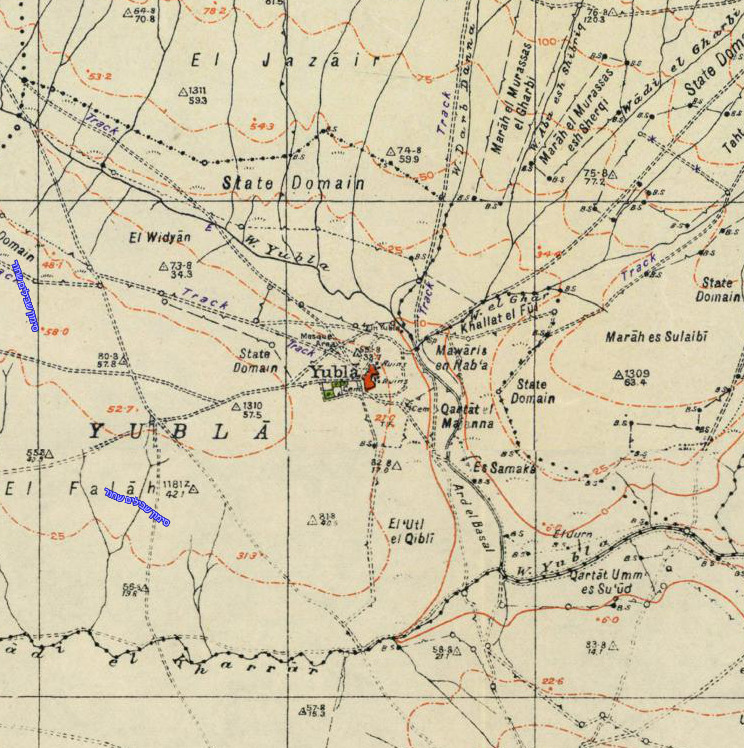
- 1870s map 1940s map modern map 1940s with modern overlay map A series of historical maps of the area around Yubla (click the buttons)

- Location within Mandatory Palestine
- Coordinates: 32°34′36″N 35°28′10″E
- Palestine grid: 194/220
- Geopolitical entity: Mandatory Palestine
- Subdistrict: Baysan
- Date of depopulation: 16 May 1948

Area
  - Total: 5,165 dunams (5.165 km^{2}; 1.994 sq mi)

Population (1945)
  - Total: 210
- Cause(s) of depopulation: Influence of nearby town's fall

Yubla (Arabic: يبلى, known to the Crusaders as Hubeleth), was a Palestinian village, located 9 kilometers north of Bisan in present-day Israel. It was depopulated during the 1948 Arab-Israeli war.

== Location ==
The village was located 9 km north-northwest of Baysan, on the southern side of a natural, shallow valley through which the Wadi al-Tayyiba flowed.

== History ==
The village was known to the Crusaders as Hubeleth, and Khirbat Umm al-Su'ud, about 1,5 km southeast of the village contained rough stone enclosures and traces of walls.

=== Ottoman era ===
In 1882, the PEF's Survey of Western Palestine found at Kh. Yebla: "Heaps of stones. No indications of date."

=== British Mandate era ===
During the period of the British Mandate of Palestine the village was classified as a "hamlet" by the Palestine Index Gazetteer. Its houses were built along the roads, especially the one to the spring Ain Yubla, north of the village.

In the 1922 census of Palestine Yubla had a population of 73 Muslims, increasing in the 1931 census to 88, still all Muslims, in 23 houses.

The villagers were working mostly in agriculture. In the 1945 statistics the village had 210 Muslim inhabitants and the total land area was 5,165 dunams. In 1944/45 a total of 25 dunums were used for citrus and bananas, 1,971 dunums were used for cereals, 37 dunums were irrigated or used for orchards, while 12 were built-up (urban) land.

=== 1948, and after ===
By the time Israel's 'Barak' troops arrived in the village on 7 June 1948, a house-to house search found the village to be completely empty. In September 1948, local kibbutzniks argued for destroying the village.

Following the war the area was incorporated into the State of Israel. Kibbutz Beit HaShita and the Gush Nuris villages were given thousands of dunams of land from Yubla and the neighbouring villages of al-Murassas, Kafra, Qumiya, and Zir'in by the Histadrut's Agicrultural Center in July and October 1948.

Moledet was established 2 km north of the village site, on land which traditionally had belonged to Taibe. Walid Khalidi notes of the former village that "The site and part of the lands are fenced in by barbed wire and are used by Israeli as a cow pasture".

In 1992 the village site was described: "The site and part of the lands are fenced in by barbed wire and are used by Israelis as a cow pasture. A number of tall date palms, some almond trees, and cactuses grow near the village stream."

== See also ==
- Depopulated Palestinian locations in Israel

== Bibliography ==
- Barron, J. B., ed. (1923). Palestine: Report and General Abstracts of the Census of 1922. Government of Palestine.
- Conder, C.R.; Kitchener, H.H. (1882). The Survey of Western Palestine: Memoirs of the Topography, Orography, Hydrography, and Archaeology. Vol. 2. London: Committee of the Palestine Exploration Fund.
- Department of Statistics (1945). Village Statistics, April, 1945. Government of Palestine.
- Fischbach, Michael R. (2012). Records of dispossession: Palestinian refugee property and the Arab–Israeli conflict (Illustrated ed.). Columbia University Press. ISBN 978-0-231-12978-7.
- Hadawi, S. (1970). Village Statistics of 1945: A Classification of Land and Area ownership in Palestine. Palestine Liberation Organization Research Center.
- Khalidi, W. (1992). All That Remains: The Palestinian Villages Occupied and Depopulated by Israel in 1948. Washington D.C.: Institute for Palestine Studies. ISBN 0-88728-224-5.
- Mills, E., ed. (1932). Census of Palestine 1931. Population of Villages, Towns and Administrative Areas. Jerusalem: Government of Palestine.
- Morris, B. (2004). The Birth of the Palestinian Refugee Problem Revisited. Cambridge University Press. ISBN 0-521-00967-7.
- Palmer, E.H. (1881). The Survey of Western Palestine: Arabic and English Name Lists Collected During the Survey by Lieutenants Conder and Kitchener, R. E. Transliterated and Explained by E.H. Palmer. Committee of the Palestine Exploration Fund.
