= Avraham Yariv =

Israeli educator and local government leader (born 1933)

- אברהם יריב

Head of the Gilboa Regional Council
- In office 1985–1994
- Preceded by: Nahum Sarig
- Succeeded by: Danny Atar

Personal details
- Born: 1933 (age 92–93) Tel Yosef, Israel
- Occupation: Educator, local government official
- Known for: Head of the Gilboa Regional Council (1985–1994)

Avraham Yariv (Hebrew: אברהם יריב; also known by the nickname Avramale; born 1933) is an Israeli educator and local government official who served as head of the Gilboa Regional Council in northern Israel from 1985 to 1994. Before entering local government he was principal of the regional Emek Harod school.

== Early life and career in education ==
Yariv was born in 1933 and was among the first children of Tel Yosef, a kibbutz in the Harod Valley founded in 1921; he remained a member of the kibbutz until 1997. As a young man he played in the Hapoel Tel Yosef wind orchestra, founded in 1926 by the conductor Shimon Shadmi.

From 1973 to 1985 Yariv was principal of the regional school at Emek Harod, situated between Tel Yosef and Ein Harod (Meuhad), which today operates as the AMAL Emek Harod multidisciplinary school.

== Head of the Gilboa Regional Council ==
Yariv became head of the Gilboa Regional Council in 1985, succeeding Nahum Sarig, and served until 1994, when he was succeeded by Danny Atar. As council head he also chaired the Gilboa local planning and building committee.

In a 1989 interview Yariv described the council as comprising 24 Jewish localities and five Arab villages with some 17,000 residents, about a third of them non-Jewish. During his term, restoration work was carried out in 1988 at the old Ein Harod cemetery near Gid'ona at his initiative, and in March 1992 he joined the Society for the Protection of Nature in Israel in opposing the establishment of a new locality in the area.

After leaving office he joined the forum of former local authority heads of the Federation of Local Authorities in Israel.

== Publications ==
- עוד חוזר הניגון [Od Hozer HaNigun; "The Melody Returns"] — a history of the Hapoel Tel Yosef wind orchestra and its founder Shimon Shadmi, compiled and prepared by Yariv and edited by Michael Peer, Afula, 2011.
- שורשיי בגלבוע [Shorashai BaGilboa; "My Roots in the Gilboa"], edited by Michael Peer.
