= Moshe Ben-Zvi =

Israeli kibbutznik, soldier and local politician (1924–2007)

- משה בן צבי

Head of the Gilboa Regional Council
- In office 1970–1977
- Preceded by: Meir Lanir
- Succeeded by: Nahum Sarig

Deputy Head of the Gilboa Regional Council
- In office 1960–1970

Personal details
- Born: Moshe Takech; 18 June 1924 Ein Harod, Mandatory Palestine
- Died: 10 September 2007 (aged 83) Ein Harod (Meuhad), Israel
- Children: 5
- Occupation: Farmer, local politician

Military service
- Allegiance: Israel
- Branch/service: Palmach, Israel Defense Forces
- Unit: Harel Brigade; Battalion 91, 9th Brigade (reserves)
- Battles/wars: 1948 Arab–Israeli War, Sinai campaign, Six-Day War, Yom Kippur War

Moshe Ben-Zvi (Hebrew: משה בן צבי; born Moshe Takech, טקץ'; 18 June 1924 – 10 September 2007) was an Israeli kibbutz member, soldier and local politician who served as head of the Gilboa Regional Council from 1970 to 1977, having previously been its deputy head under Meir Lanir from 1960 to 1970.

== Early life ==
Ben-Zvi was born Moshe Takech on 18 June 1924 to Zvi and Sheindel Takech, and grew up beside the spring at Ein Harod, one of the second generation of children born on the kibbutz. He was educated at the kibbutz school, where he was a member of its fifth graduating class.

== Military service ==
On finishing secondary school Ben-Zvi enlisted in the Haganah and the Notrim (Jewish Settlement Police). He completed a platoon commanders' course and a special intelligence course run under the direction of Ezra Danin, after which he was placed in charge of intelligence for the Gilboa and Beit She'an areas, preparing files on local villages and handling day-to-day security matters, including efforts to curb agricultural theft in the region.

During the 1948 Arab–Israeli War he fought with the Palmach's Harel Brigade in the operations on the road to Jerusalem. In the reserves he served in Battalion 91 of the 9th Brigade, with which he reached Sharm el-Sheikh during the 1956 Sinai campaign; he later fought in the Gilboa sector in the Six-Day War and in the Sinai, in the division commanded by Rafael Eitan, during the Yom Kippur War. According to his family, his reserve post in Battalion 91 was commander of the headquarters company.

Between periods of military service he worked in various branches of the kibbutz economy at Ein Harod, including the dairy, the garage and, above all, the field crops.

== Gilboa Regional Council ==
From 1960 to 1970 Ben-Zvi served as deputy to Meir Lanir, the head of the Gilboa Regional Council. After Lanir died in office in September 1969, Ben-Zvi was elected to succeed him—an outcome described as unexpected—and he headed the council for seven years, from 1970 to 1977. He was succeeded by Nahum Sarig.

== Later life and death ==
After leaving office Ben-Zvi returned to work in the fields of Ein Harod. He and his wife Tamar, who had also served in the Palmach, were both later diagnosed with cancer, from which both died; Ben-Zvi died seven years after his diagnosis and Tamar ten years after hers. (Note: The Hebrew Wikipedia article on Ben-Zvi states that it is based on a memorial volume produced by the family and held in the archive of Kibbutz Ein Harod Meuhad. The volume is unpublished and could not be consulted; statements drawn only from it are tagged accordingly.)

Ben-Zvi died on 10 September 2007 at Ein Harod (Meuhad), aged 83, and was buried there. He was survived by five children, twenty grandchildren and two great-grandchildren. (Note: The Hebrew Wikipedia article gives "about 20 grandchildren and 3 great-grandchildren"; the Palmach veterans' database entry gives twenty grandchildren and two great-grandchildren.)

== Notes ==
Political offices
Preceded by Meir Lanir	Head of the Gilboa Regional Council; 1970–1977	Succeeded by Nahum Sarig
