= Leopard Temple =

Archaeological site in Israel

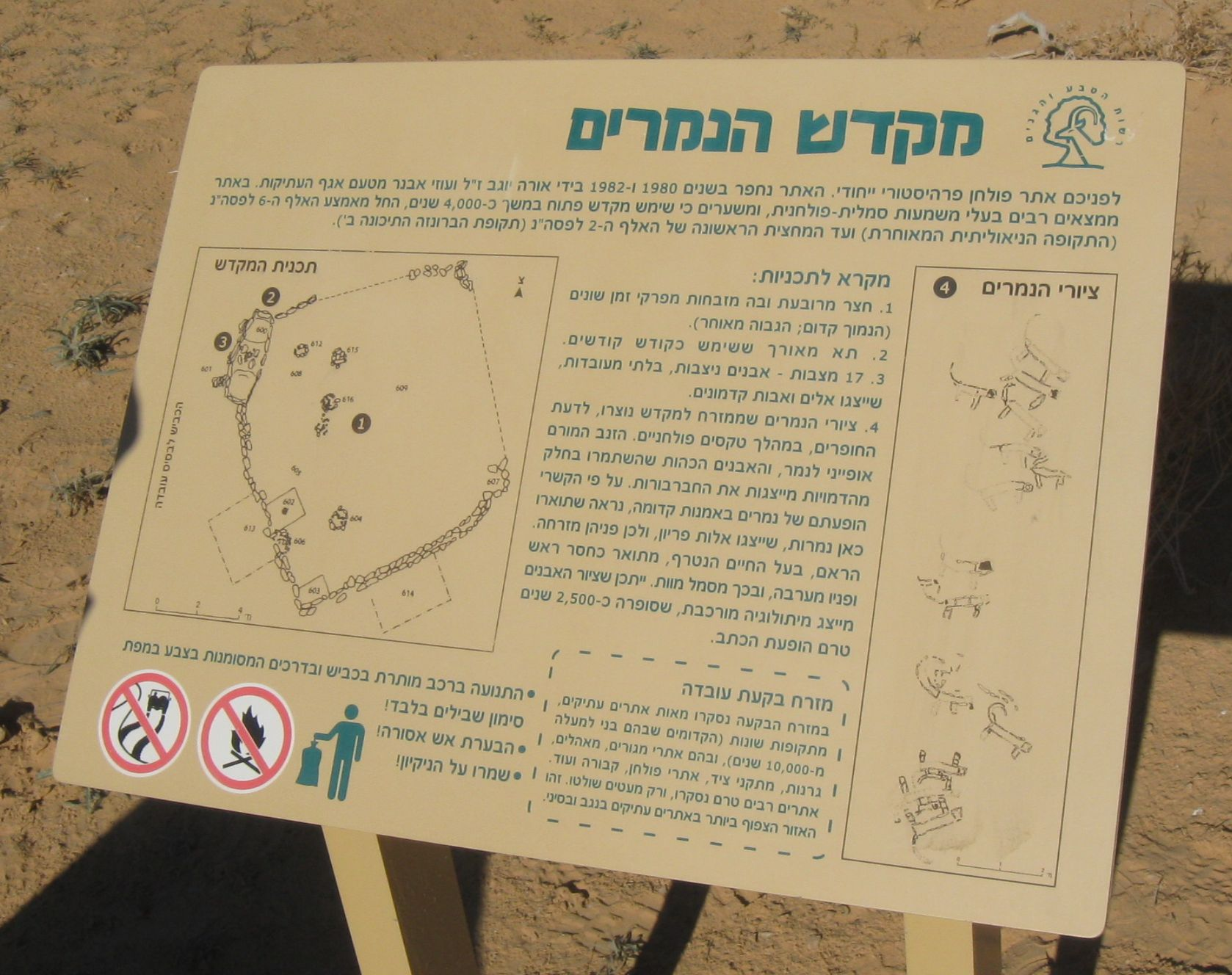
An explanatory sign on the site

The Leopard Temple (Hebrew: מקדש הנמרים) is the name of an archaeological site of a 7,000 year old temple in the Uvda basin of the Negev in southern Israel. The name refers to the Arabian leopard, which is no longer found in Israel.

The site was investigated by Uzi Avner and Ora Yogev on behalf of the Israel Antiquities Authority. It was first discovered in the early 1980s by an Israel Defense Forces (IDF) tank that passed near it; the site was accidentally destroyed by IDF tanks in the late 1980s during a military exercise.
