= Danna, Baysan =

Danna دنه
- Etymology: the Amphora
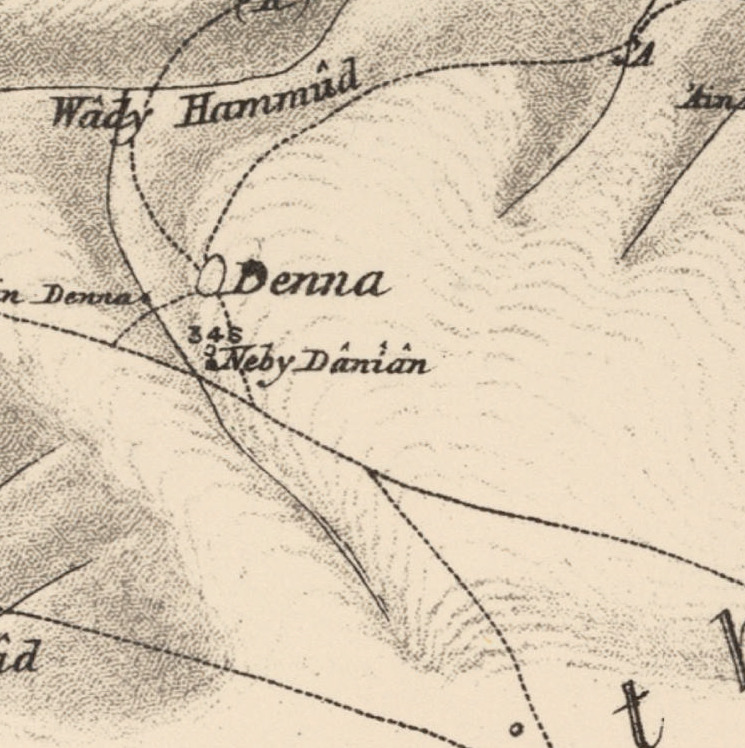
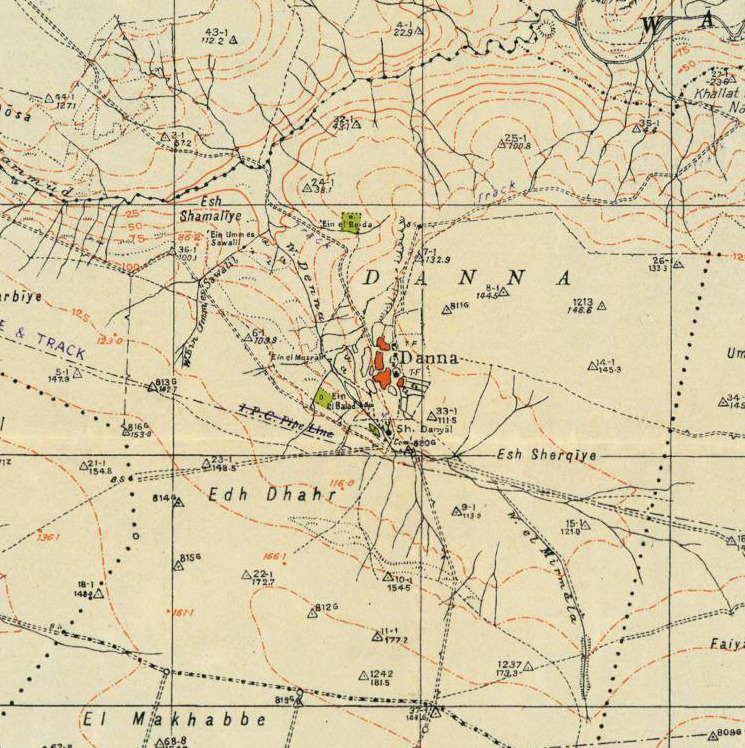
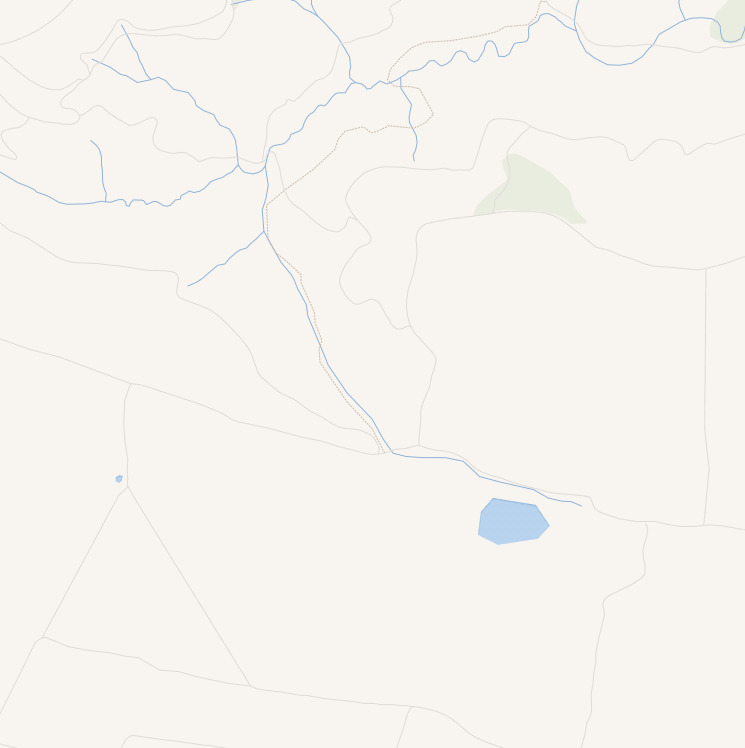
- 1870s map 1940s map modern map A series of historical maps of the area around Danna, Baysan (click the buttons)

- Location within Mandatory Palestine
- Coordinates: 32°36′47″N 35°28′28″E
- Palestine grid: 194/224
- Geopolitical entity: Mandatory Palestine
- Subdistrict: Baysan
- Date of depopulation: 28 May 1948

Area
  - Total: 6,614 dunams (6.614 km^{2}; 2.554 sq mi)

Population (1945)
  - Total: 190
- Cause(s) of depopulation: Expulsion by Yishuv forces

Danna (Arabic: دنه), was a Palestinian village 13 kilometres north of Baysan that was captured by the Israel Defense Forces during the 1948 Arab-Israeli war, and the villagers were expelled.

== History ==
=== Byzantine period ===
A basalt lintel decorated with a menorah bas-relief, dated to the 5th-6th century and discovered at Kafr Danna, is possibly the only remaining element of a Byzantine synagogue once standing there.

=== Ottoman period ===
In 1517 Danna was incorporated into the Ottoman Empire with the rest of Palestine. During the 16th and 17th centuries, it belonged to the Turabay Emirate (1517-1683), which encompassed also the Jezreel Valley, Haifa, Jenin, Beit She'an Valley, northern Jabal Nablus, Bilad al-Ruha/Ramot Menashe, and the northern part of the Sharon plain.

In 1596, Danna was part of the nahiya (subdistrict) of Shafa under the liwa' (district) of Lajjun with a population of 5 Muslim families, (estimated 28 people). It paid a fixed tax rate of 25% to the Ottoman government on a number of crops, including wheat and barley, and other types of produce, such as goats and beehives; a total of 3,500 akçe.

Johann Ludwig Burckhardt, a Swiss traveler to Palestine who passed through the area around 1817, mentioned the village without providing a description.

In 1838, Denna was noted as part of the Jenin District.

Victor Guérin described in 1875 the village as being "humble", and situated on a hill. He noted that it had once been much larger, as north of the village centre were ruins of houses. In 1882, the PEF's Survey of Western Palestine described Danna as being situated on a slope, and surrounded by farmland. There was a spring with a watering trough to the west. The village houses were built of stone and adobe.

=== British Mandate era ===
In the 1922 census of Palestine, conducted by the Mandatory Palestine authorities, Danna had a population of 176 Muslims, decreasing in the 1931 census to 149, still all Muslims, in 28 houses.

The village was shaped like a rectangle whose longer sides were aligned in a north–south direction. During this era the village expanded and new houses, constructed of stone and adobe brick, were built along the road to the nearby village of Kafra. It was classified as a hamlet in the Palestine Index Gazetteer. There were a few shops and a mosque which contained the maqam (shrine) of a Shaykh Daniyal. The village spring provided water for all the residents. The villagers worked primarily in rainfed agriculture.

In the 1945 statistics Danna had a population of 190 Muslims, with a total of 6,614 dunams of land. Of this, a total of 5,097 dunams was used for cereals; 14 dunams were irrigated or used for orchards, while 15 were built-up (urban) land. Grass and leafy vegetation grew on the slopes and peaks of the neighboring mountains and were used for grazing.

=== 1948, aftermath ===
On the 28 May 1948 the village was occupied by Israeli forces, and the villagers were expelled.

According to the Palestinian historian Walid Khalidi, 1992, the remaining structures on the village land were:

"Bushes, cactus plants, thorns, and grass now grow around piles of rubble on the village site. Thick weeds grow in the wadi and near the springs. The lands in the area are cultivated by Israeli farmers."

== See also ==
- Depopulated Palestinian locations in Israel

== Bibliography ==
- Barron, J.B., ed. (1923). Palestine: Report and General Abstracts of the Census of 1922. Government of Palestine.
- Burckhardt, J.L. (1822). Travels in Syria and the Holy Land. J. Murray.
- Conder, C.R.; Kitchener, H.H. (1882). The Survey of Western Palestine: Memoirs of the Topography, Orography, Hydrography, and Archaeology. Vol. 2. London: Committee of the Palestine Exploration Fund.
- Government of Palestine, Department of Statistics (1945). Village Statistics, April, 1945.
- Guérin, V. (1880). Description Géographique Historique et Archéologique de la Palestine (in French). Vol. 3: Galilee, pt. 1. Paris: L'Imprimerie Nationale.
- Hadawi, S. (1970). Village Statistics of 1945: A Classification of Land and Area ownership in Palestine. Palestine Liberation Organization Research Center.
- Hütteroth, W.-D.; Abdulfattah, K. (1977). Historical Geography of Palestine, Transjordan and Southern Syria in the Late 16th Century. Erlanger Geographische Arbeiten, Sonderband 5. Erlangen, Germany: Vorstand der Fränkischen Geographischen Gesellschaft. ISBN 3-920405-41-2.
- Khalidi, W. (1992). All That Remains: The Palestinian Villages Occupied and Depopulated by Israel in 1948. Washington D.C.: Institute for Palestine Studies. ISBN 0-88728-224-5.
- Mills, E., ed. (1932). Census of Palestine 1931. Population of Villages, Towns and Administrative Areas. Jerusalem: Government of Palestine.
- Morris, B. (2004). The Birth of the Palestinian Refugee Problem Revisited. Cambridge University Press. ISBN 978-0-521-00967-6.
- Palmer, E.H. (1881). The Survey of Western Palestine: Arabic and English Name Lists Collected During the Survey by Lieutenants Conder and Kitchener, R. E. Transliterated and Explained by E.H. Palmer. Committee of the Palestine Exploration Fund.
- Robinson, E.; Smith, E. (1841). Biblical Researches in Palestine, Mount Sinai and Arabia Petraea: A Journal of Travels in the year 1838. Vol. 3. Boston: Crocker & Brewster.
