= Meir Lanir =

German-born Israeli farmer and local politician (1911–1969)

- מאיר לניר

Head of the Gilboa Regional Council
- In office 1959 – 8 September 1969
- Preceded by: Tuvia Ben-David
- Succeeded by: Moshe Ben-Zvi

Personal details
- Born: Martin Wollner; 29 November 1911 Nuremberg, Kingdom of Bavaria, German Empire
- Died: 8 September 1969 (aged 57) Moledet, Israel
- Resting place: Moledet cemetery
- Spouse: Dora Steinhardt (m. 1936)
- Children: 4
- Occupation: Farmer, cooperative-movement official, local politician
- Known for: Co-founder of Moledet; initiating the Ta'anakh settlements and Ma'ayan Harod National Park

Meir Lanir (Hebrew: מאיר לניר; born Martin Wollner; 29 November 1911 – 8 September 1969) was a German-born Israeli farmer, cooperative-movement official and local politician. A co-founder of the cooperative moshav shitufi Moledet, he served as head of the Gilboa Regional Council from 1959 until his death in 1969.

== Early life ==
Lanir was born Martin Wollner in Nuremberg, in the German Empire, to Zilli (née Schloss) and Heinrich (Hanoch) Wollner. In his youth he was active in Zionist youth movements, chiefly during his years studying law at university, where he also learned Hebrew with the intention of emigrating to Mandatory Palestine. After the Nazis came to power in 1933 he abandoned his studies and immigrated in May 1933, settling at Nahalal.

At Nahalal he received his agricultural training in the household of Zvi Yehuda, whom he regarded as a model for combining farming with public service. Lanir gathered around him a group of young people who called themselves the "Wollner group" (ארגון וולנר), and who later founded the cooperative settlement of Moledet.

In 1936 Lanir married Dora Steinhardt, and the couple travelled to Germany as emissaries of the Moshavim Movement. They returned in 1937, shortly before Moledet was established as a Tower and Stockade settlement. They had four children: Yuval, Hava, Roni and Doron. (Note: The Gilboa Regional Council's biography of Lanir names three children—Hava, Roni and Doron. The Hebrew Wikipedia article names a fourth, Yuval.)

== Career ==
In Moledet's early years Lanir served as its external secretary, and became known for his determination and energy in promoting the settlement's development. As one of the originators of the moshav shitufi idea, he was called on to represent the movement at the Agricultural Centre (המרכז החקלאי), the agricultural arm of the Histadrut. In 1958 he was sent by the Ministry of Agriculture to Ghana to help develop agricultural cooperatives there.

=== Head of the Gilboa Regional Council ===
Lanir succeeded Tuvia Ben-David as head of the Gilboa Regional Council; the council dates the start of his term to 1959, and his election was reported in the press in February 1960. In office he worked to strengthen and integrate a region containing both long-established and newly founded communities—moshavim, kibbutzim and Arab villages.

He initiated the establishment of the new settlements of the Ta'anakh region and supported their settlers during their first years. He also conceived the idea of a national park at Ma'ayan Harod and began its practical implementation.

== Personal life and death ==
Lanir died in office on 8 September 1969, aged 57, and was buried in the cemetery of Moledet. He was survived by his wife Dora and their children. He was succeeded as head of the council by Moshe Ben-Zvi.

== Notes ==
Political offices
Preceded by Tuvia Ben-David	Head of the Gilboa Regional Council; 1959–1969	Succeeded by Moshe Ben-Zvi
