= Ink Flag =

Handmade Israeli flag raised at the end of the 1948 Arab–Israeli War

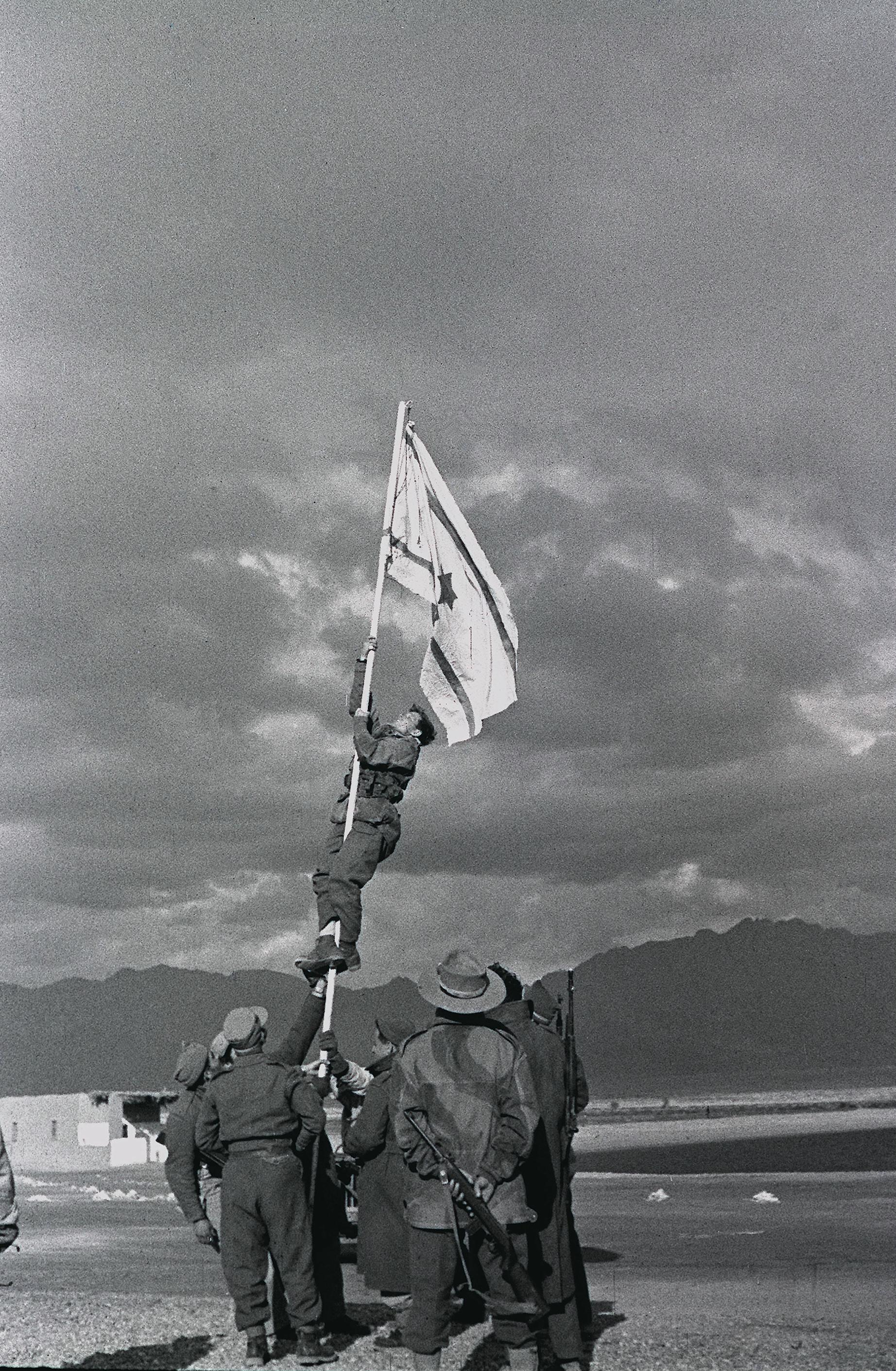
Raising of the Ink Flag, a photograph by Micha Perry. The soldier on the pole is Captain Avraham Adan.

The Ink Flag (Hebrew: דֶּגֶל הַדְּיוֹ, Degel HaDyo) was a handmade Israeli flag raised in March 1949 during the 1948 Arab–Israeli War to mark the capture of Umm Rashrash. The flag’s display in what later became the city of Eilat was replaced two hours later by an official flag when the Golani Brigade arrived. The raising of the Ink Flag is considered to be the end of the war and the birth of Israel.

== History ==
On 5 March 1949, Israel launched Operation Uvda, the last military maneuver of the 1948 Arab–Israeli War. On 10 March, the Israel Defense Forces reached the shores of the Red Sea at Umm Rashrash, west of Aqaba in the area of biblical Elath, and captured it without a battle. The Negev Brigade and Golani Brigade took part in the operation. A makeshift flag created from a white sheet inscribed with ink was raised by Captain (later General) Avraham Adan, company commander of the 8th Battalion of the Negev Brigade.

The improvised flag was made on the order of Negev Brigade commander Nahum Sarig, when it was discovered that the brigade did not have an Israeli flag on hand. The soldiers found a sheet, drew two ink stripes, and sewed on a Star of David torn off a first-aid kit.

In Eilat, a bronze sculpture by Israeli sculptor Daniel Kafri commemorates the event, unveiled on 28 February 1996. This historical place was already declared a National Heritage Site on 19 January 1994. The photo of the raising of the Ink Flag, taken by the soldier Micha Perry, bears resemblance to the 1945 American photo Raising the Flag on Iwo Jima.

== Gallery ==
Digitised rendition of the Ink Flag

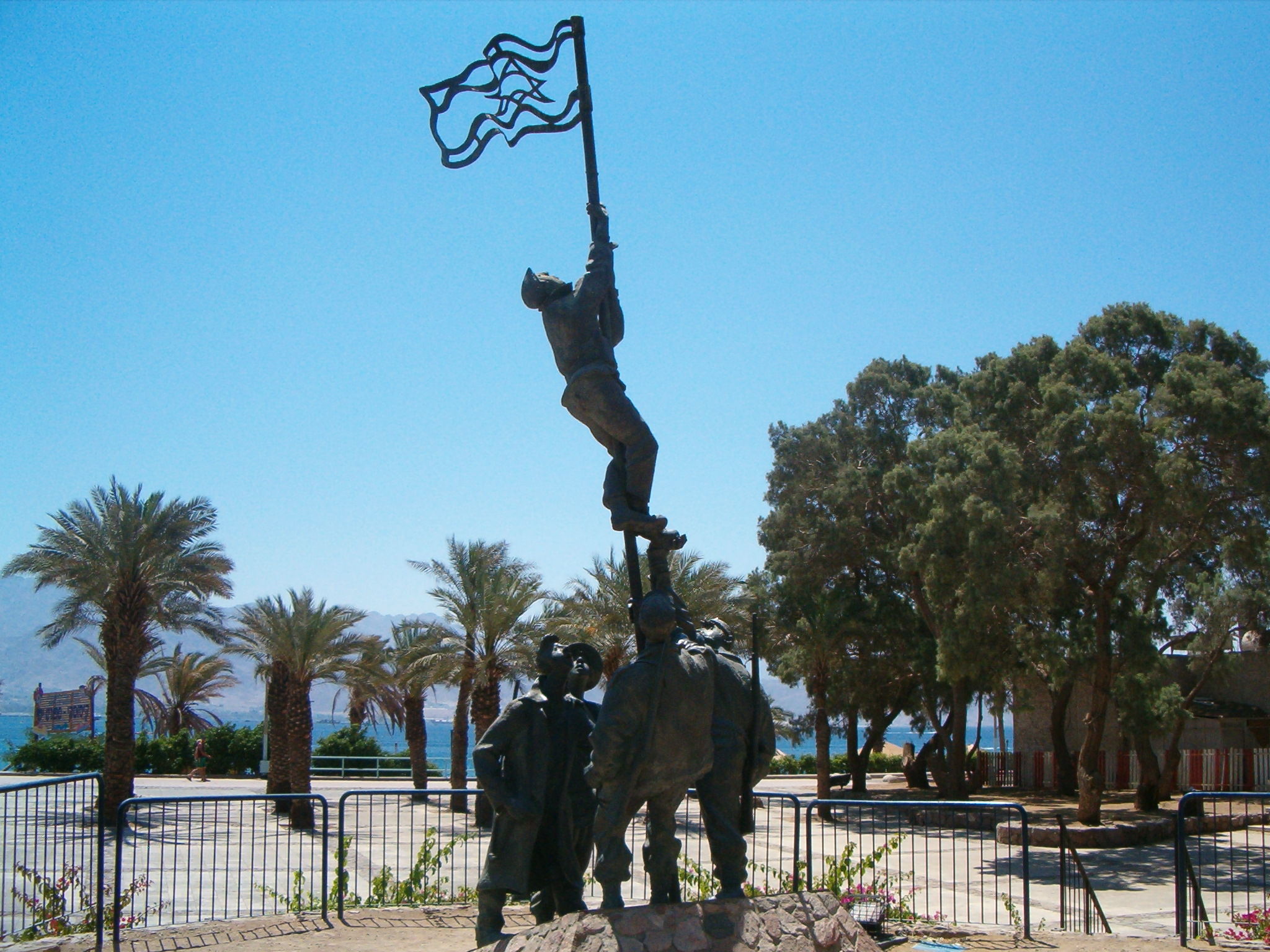
Commemorative sculpture by Daniel Kafri

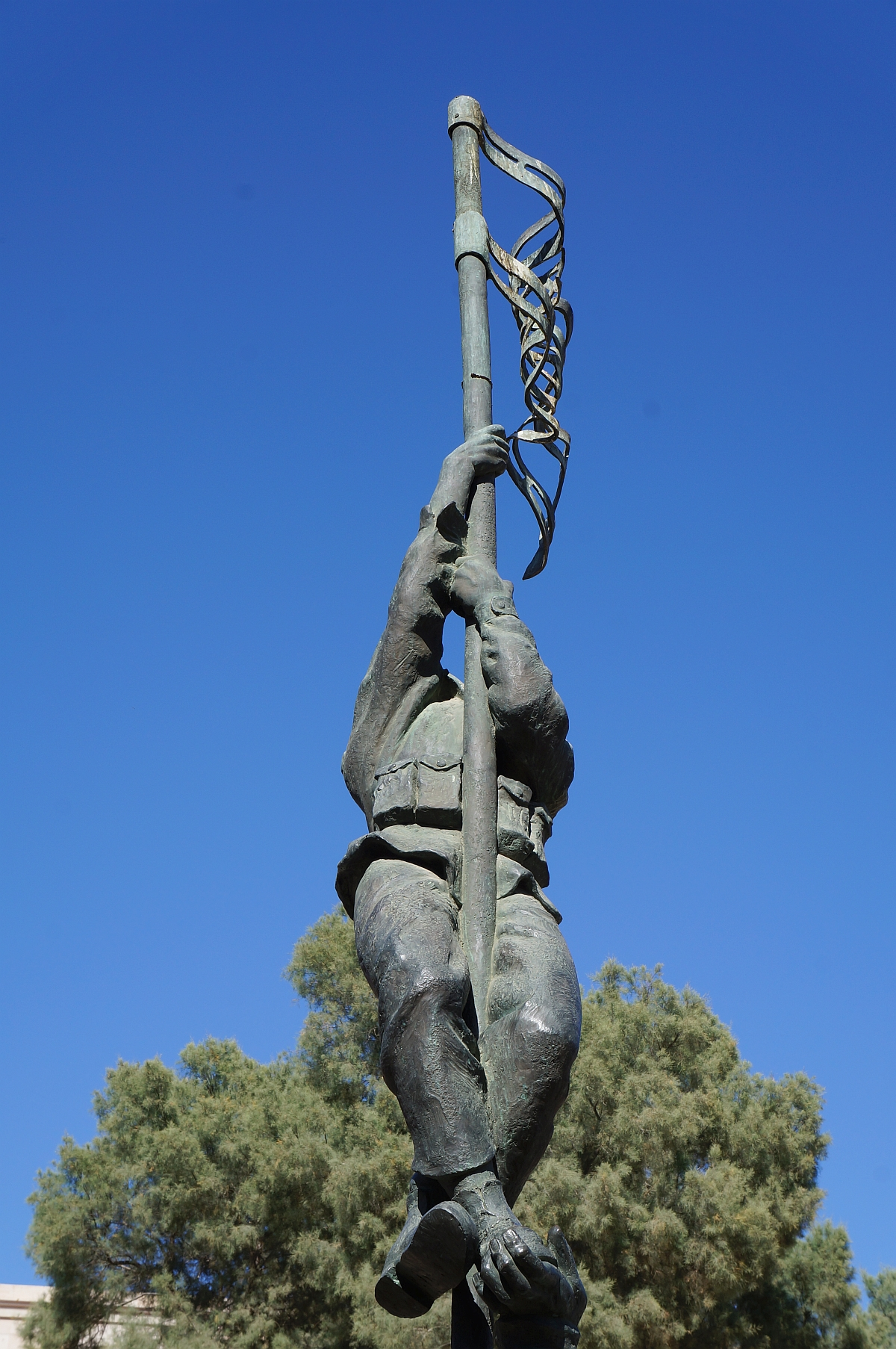
Close-up of the statue's representation of Avraham Adan, the man on the pole
