= Beit HaShita =

Beit HaShita: בית השיטה (Hebrew)
- Kibbutz
- View of Beit HaShita (1950s)
- Etymology: House of the Acacia
- Location within Jezreel Valley region of Israel Location within Israel
- Coordinates: 32°33′15″N 35°26′15″E
- Country: Israel
- District: Northern
- Subdistrict: Jezreel
- Council: Gilboa
- Affiliation: Kibbutz Movement
- Founded: 12 December 1935; 90 years ago
- Founder: Kvutzat HaHugim-HaMahanot HaOlim members
- Population (2024): 1,468
- Website: beithashita.org.il

Beit HaShita (Hebrew: בית השיטה, lit. 'House of the Acacia') is a kibbutz in northern Israel, under the jurisdiction of Gilboa Regional Council. As of 2024 it had a population of 1,468.

== Geography ==
The built-up area of Beit Hashita ranges from 70 meters below sea level to sea level.

== History ==
The kibbutz traces its origin to a group meeting held in Hadera in 1928, by "Kvuzat HaHugim" of the HaMahanot HaOlim movement from Haifa and Jerusalem. The first members lived at nearby Ein Harod until 1934, when establishment of the kibbutz began at its present location about 1 km east of Shatta.

The land of the kibbutz was purchased by the Palestine Land Development Company from its Arab owners in 1931. In 2015, a grandchild of kibbutz residents living in Wales, Jasmine Donahaye, published Losing Israel in which she expressed her disillusionment on learning of the eviction of Arabs on the founding of the kibbutz.

The kibbutz was later named after the biblical town Beit Hashita, where the Midianites fled after being beaten by Gideon (Judges 7:22), thought to be located where Shatta was. It falls under the jurisdiction of Gilboa Regional Council.

In the 1945 statistics, Beit hash Shitta had 590 inhabitants, all Jews. It was noted that Shatta was an alternative name.

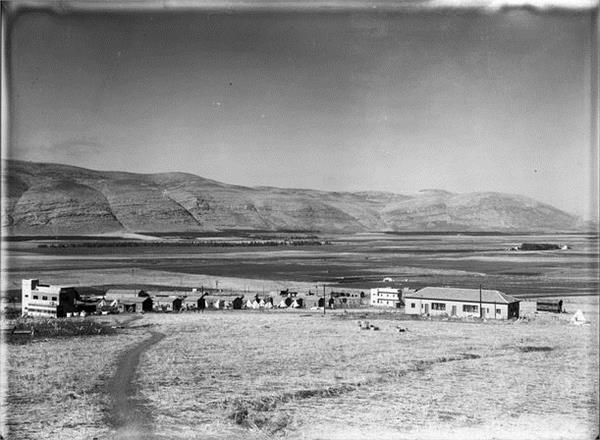
Beit HaShita 1940

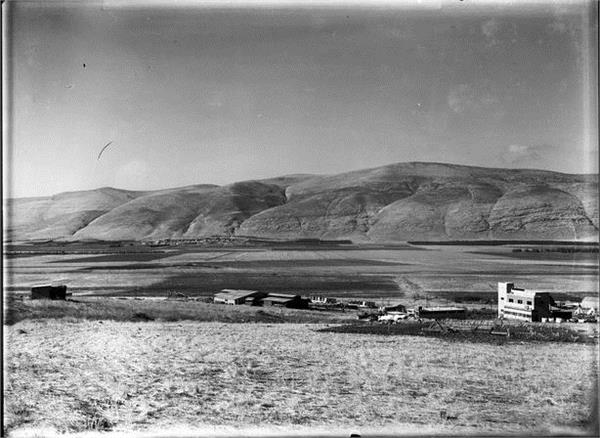
Beit HaShita 1940

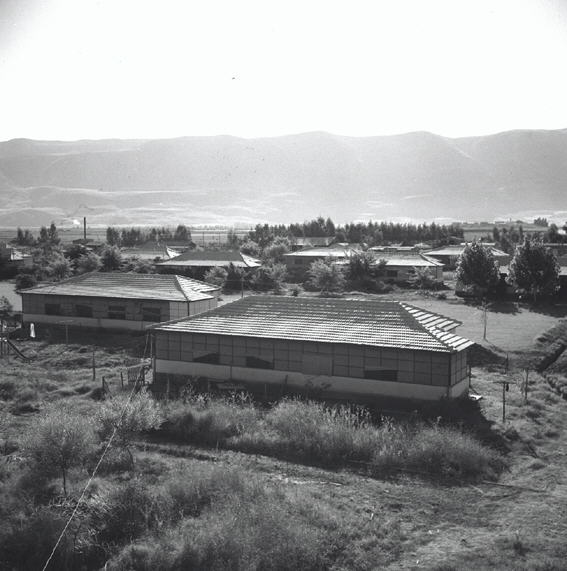
Beit HaShita 1945

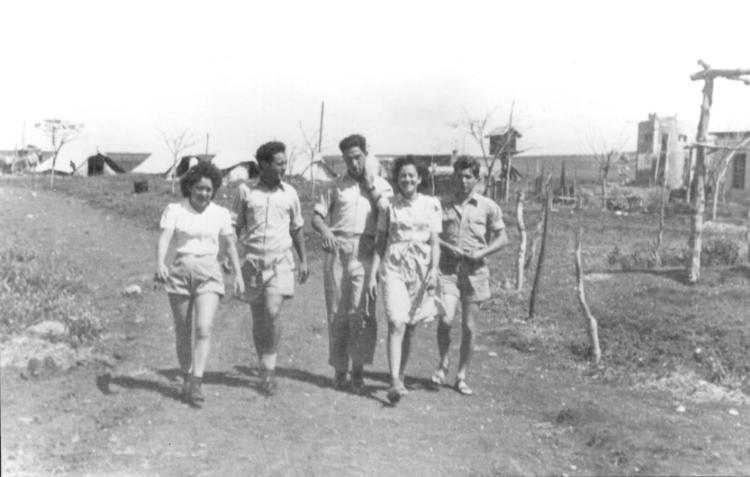
Palmach camp at Beit HaShita, 1947

=== Post-1948 ===
After the 1948 Arab-Israeli War, Beit HaShita absorbed 5,400 dunams from the lands of the newly depopulated Arab villages of Yubla and Al-Murassas.

Eleven kibbutz members fell during the 1973 Yom Kippur War, the largest number as a percentage of the population of any town in Israel.

== Economy ==
Beit Hashita produced cotton, wheat, melons, olives and citrus fruits. There was also a dairy barn, chickens and a fish farm. In the 1960s, Beit HaShita established a pickling factory which produces and markets pickles, olives and pickled vegetables under the brand name Beit HaShita. The factory also produces syrups for making juices under the brand name Vitaminchick. The factory was bought from the kibbutz in 1998 by the Israeli food manufacturer, Osem.

== Religion and culture ==
The Kibbutz Institute for Holidays and Jewish Culture, an organization that preserves the cultural heritage of the kibbutz, was established by kibbutz member Aryeh Ben-Gurion, nephew of Israeli Prime Minister David Ben-Gurion. Beit Hashita served as the basis for the 1981 English language book Kibbutz Makom, which described the kibbutz society. Many of the member families of the kibbutz are secular. There is however a small orthodox synagogue.

== Notable people ==
- Yair Rosenblum
- Azaria Alon
- Moshe Peled

== Bibliography ==
- Department of Statistics (1945). Village Statistics, April, 1945. Government of Palestine.
- Donahaye, Jasmine (2015). Losing Israel. Seren Books. ISBN 978-1781722527.
- Fischbach, Michael R. (2012). Records of dispossession: Palestinian refugee property and the Arab–Israeli conflict (Illustrated ed.). Columbia University Press. ISBN 978-0-231-12978-7.
- Kark, R. (1997). "Mamlūk and Ottoman Cadastral Surveys and Early Mapping of Landed Properties in Palestine". Agricultural History. 71 (1): 46–70.
- Hadawi, S. (1970). Village Statistics of 1945: A Classification of Land and Area ownership in Palestine. Palestine Liberation Organization Research Center.
- Lieblich, A. (1981). Kibbutz Makom: Report From an Israeli kibbutz. Pantheon Books. ISBN 0-394-50724-X.
- Mills, E., ed. (1932). Census of Palestine 1931. Population of Villages, Towns and Administrative Areas. Jerusalem: Government of Palestine.
- State of Israel (1952). Government Year-book (English ed.).
