= List of National Heritage Sites of Israel =

List of National Heritage Sites of Israel, as designated by the government of the State of Israel:

- Atlit detainee camp, Atlit: Detention center for Jewish immigrants seeking refuge in Palestine during the Mandated period.
- Um Rashrash: Memorial site in Eilat, where the Flag of Israel was raised for the first time, when the Israeli soldiers arrived on 10 March 1949.
- Hurvat Anim
- Tel Hazor
- Cave of the Patriarchs, Hebron: Traditional burial place of Abraham, Sarah, Isaac, Rebeccah, Jacob and Leah.
- Qumran Caves
- Rachel's Tomb, Bethlehem: Traditional burial place of the Hebrew matriarch Rachel.
