= Operation Uvda =

1949 Israeli military operation

- Part of the 1948 Arab–Israeli War
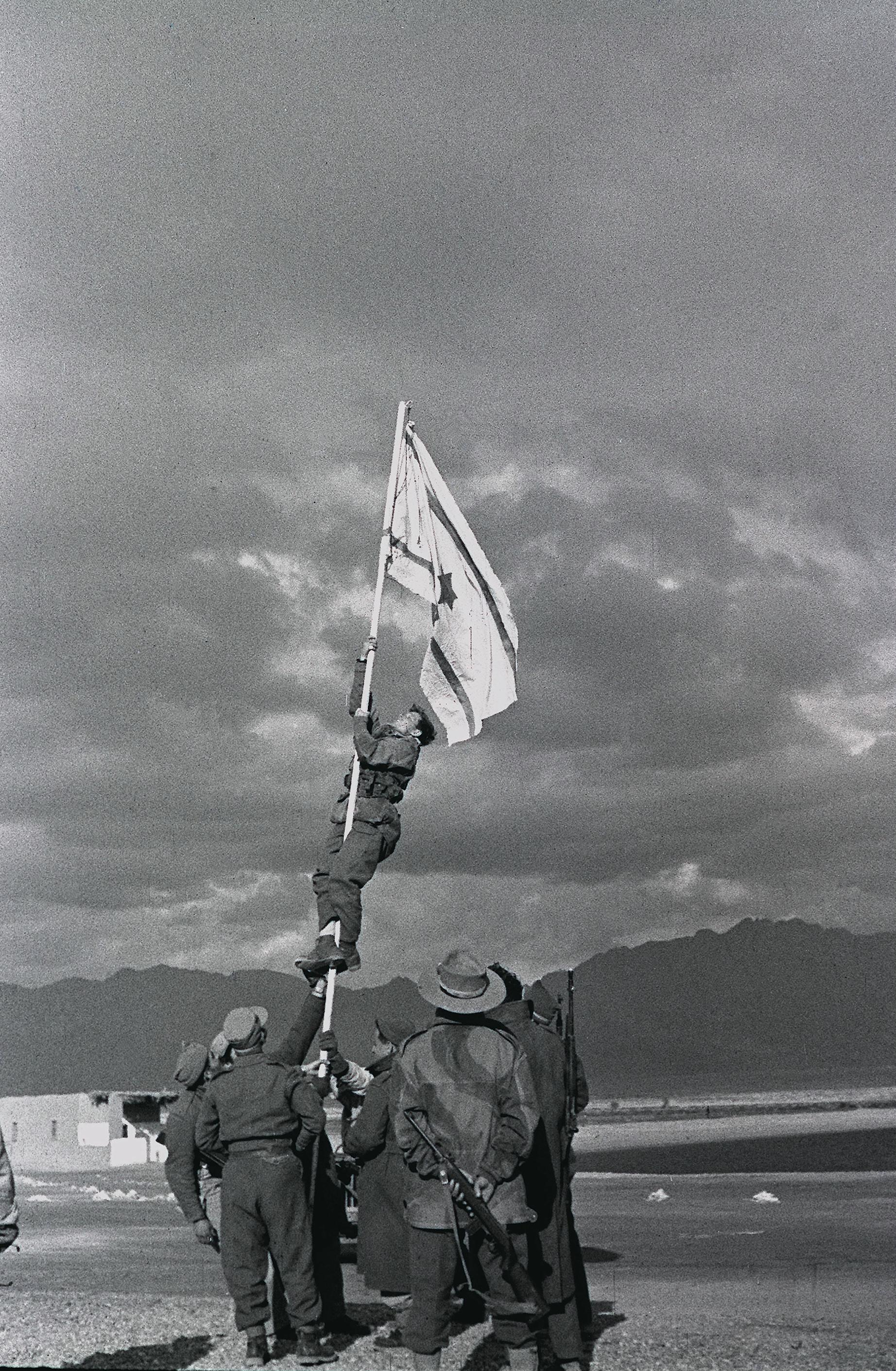
- Captain Avraham "Bren" Adan raising the Ink Flag at Umm Rashrash (a site now in Eilat), marking the end of the war
Date	5–10 March 1949
Location	Umm Rashrash (Eilat), Israel 29°33′0″N 34°57′0″E
Result	Israeli victory

Belligerents
Israel	Transjordan

Commanders and leaders
(Israel) Yigal Allon (Israel) Avraham Adan (Israel) Moshe Dayan (Israel) Yitzhak Rabin (Israel) Nahum Sarig	Habis Majali (WIA); Glubb Pasha (POW)

Strength
2,500 troops	Unknown
- Location within Israel

Operation Uvda (Hebrew: מבצע עובדה, Mivtza Uvda) was an operation conducted by the Israel Defense Forces during the 1948 Arab–Israeli War, from 5 March to 10 March 1949. It was the last campaign undertaken by the IDF during the war and its objective was to capture the southern Negev desert, which was claimed by the Kingdom of Jordan to be under Jordanian control in the armistice talks of 1949.

The southern Negev was designated to be part of the Jewish State in the 1947 UN Partition Plan. The name uvda (עובדה) is Hebrew for "fact", referring to the operation's objective to establish de facto Israeli sovereignty over the territory in question, rather than actually conquer it. As such, the Israeli forces did not meet significant resistance on their way. The region claimed during this operation is now referred to as Uvda.

The Negev, Golani and Alexandroni brigades participated in the operation, as well as a number of smaller units.

== Prior reconnaissance ==
In January 1949, slightly over a month before the operation, a small unit was dispatched to reconnoiter the southern Negev, with limited resources and no ability to receive tactical aid. The unit's mission was to map the region, as the best available map of the time was a GSGS map scaled 1:250,000. The unit was reinforced by reconnaissance aircraft and heavy use was made of aerial photography stereoscopic imaging.

The unit moved in two parts: one through the center of the Negev and one through the Arava. It was strictly forbidden to engage the Jordanian Arab Legion or enter the Sinai. The unit encountered Bedouins in Ras al-Naqb and immediately set out to return to Beersheba using a different route. As a result, the Arab Legion again manned posts at Ras al-Naqb, which had previously been abandoned.

== Timeline of the operation ==
On 5 March 1949, (4 Adar 5709) Negev Brigade forces set out from Beersheba to the Ramon Crater, through Bir 'Asluj. Golani forces simultaneously set out from Mamshit to Ein Husub.

On 6 March, the Negev Brigade travelled to Sde Avraham and began to clear land for an airfield there.

In the night of 6 March, 7th Brigade reinforcements from the Gahal platoon arrived by air in the newly cleared airfield. They carried supplies and fuel vital to continue the operation.

On 7 March, Golani forces conquered the village Ein Harouf. On the same day, the Alexandroni Brigade moved from Beersheba through Mamshit towards Sodom. From there it made an amphibious landing near Ein Gedi through the Dead Sea.

On 8 March, Golani conquered Ein Ghamr. The defending Jordanian forces withdrew. Simultaneously, Negev forces moved towards Umm Rashrash through the Valley of Fingers. At night, the Alexandroni Brigade set sail from Sodom on the Dead Sea and landed at Ein Gedi before dawn. This was called Operation Itzuv ("Stabilization").

On 8-9 March, the Alexandroni Brigade split into three groups, one of which captured Ein Gedi and the southern group captured Masada. During that time the Negev Brigade stayed at the Valley of Fingers for two days, looking for a roundabout way to reach Ras al-Naqb.

On 9 March, Golani forces captured Gharandal and proceeded to Ein Ghadyan (now Yotvata).

In the morning of 10 March, an aerial photographer discovered that the police station guarding Ras al-Naqb was abandoned. The Negev Brigade set out towards Umm Rashrash through Ras al-Naqb.

Negev and Golani Brigades actively competed on who would reach the Red Sea first, and on 10 March at 15:00, the Negev Brigade accomplished the feat, reaching the abandoned police station at Umm Rashrash (where the city of Eilat was later built). The Golani Brigade arrived two hours later.

Because Operation Uvda was the last military operation during the war, the raising at the police station of the hand-drawn Israeli flag (popularly known as the Ink Flag) on 10 March at 16:00 is considered to have ended the war.

The front commander sent this telegram at the conclusion of the campaign: "On Hagana day, the 11th of Adar, the Palmach Negev Brigade and the Golani Brigade present the Gulf of Aqaba to the State of Israel".

== Gallery ==
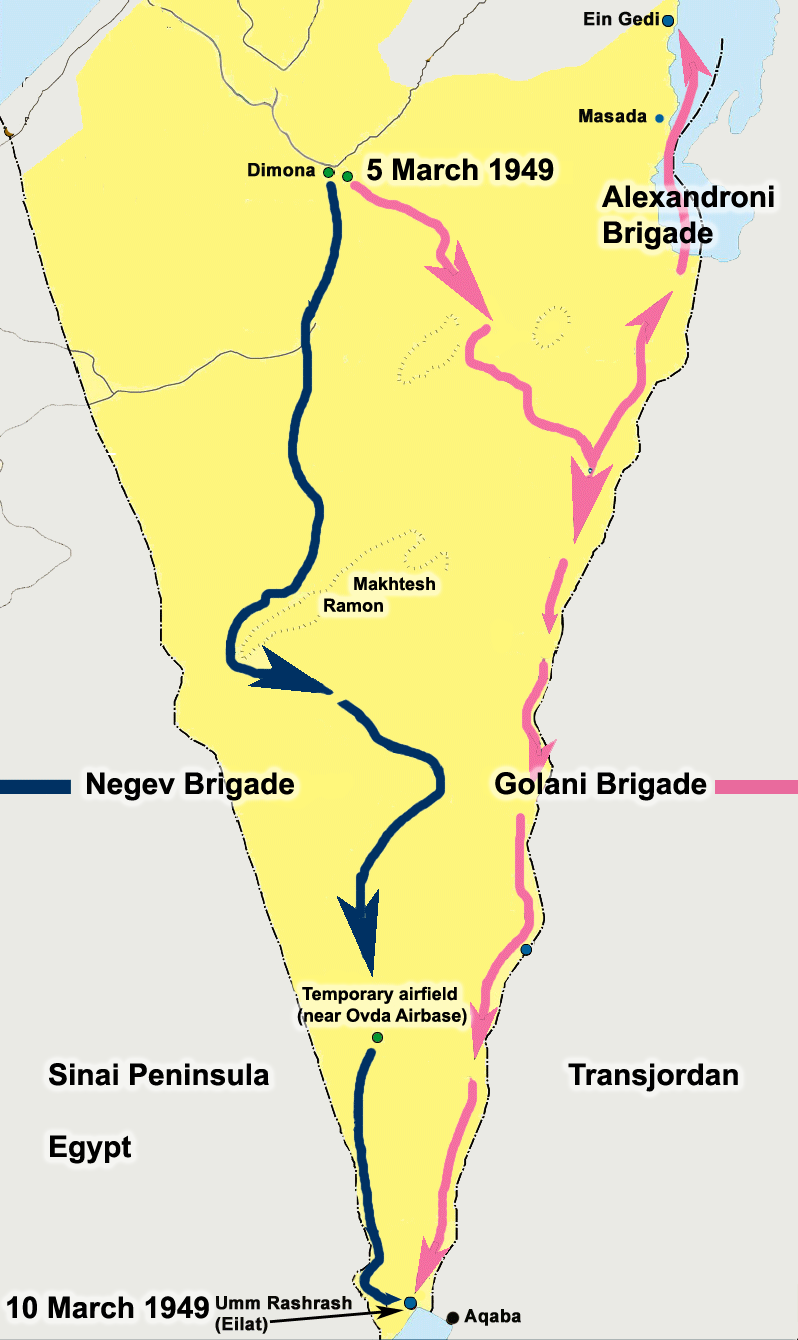
Map of Operation Uvda

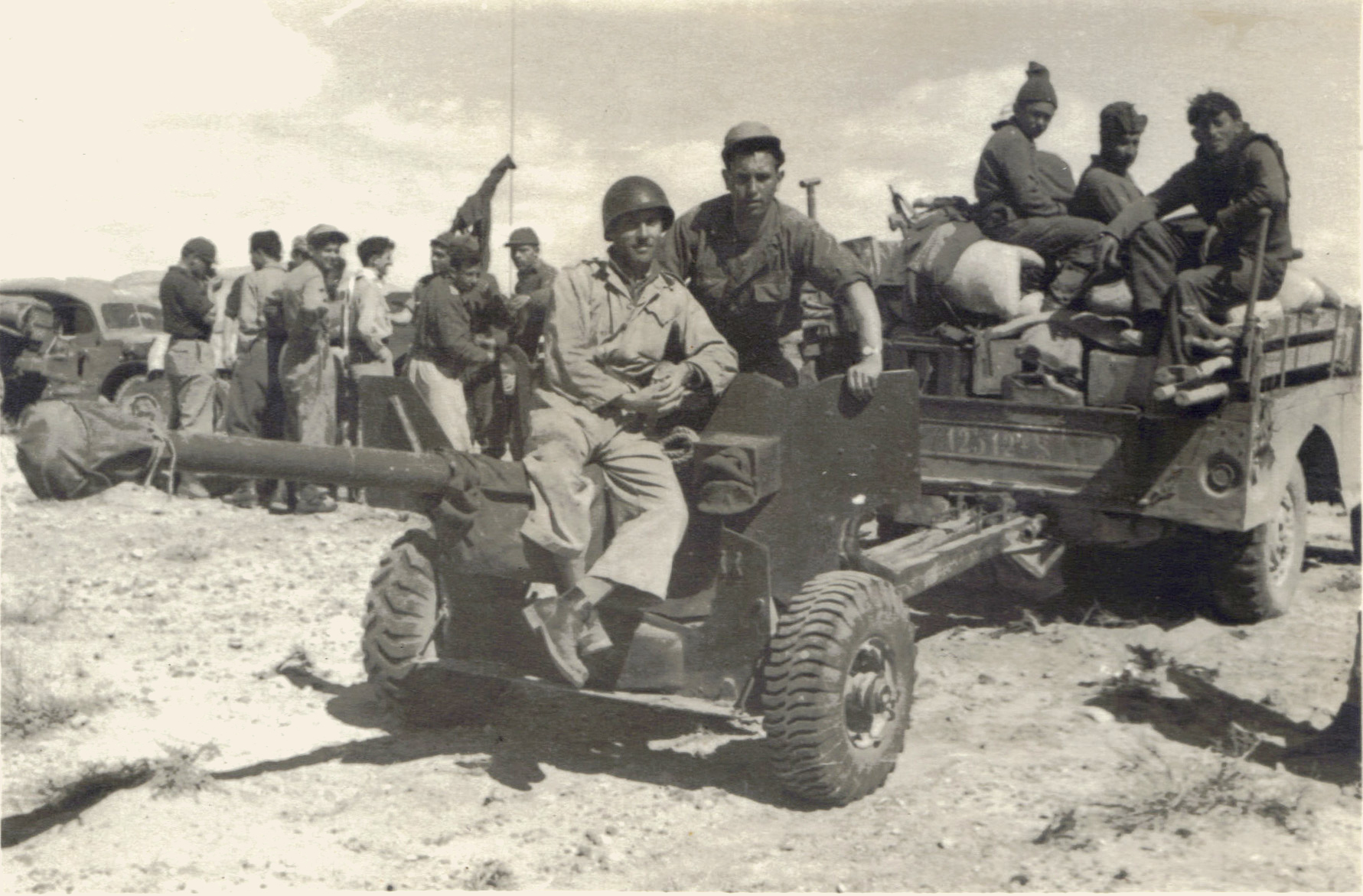
The Golani Brigade during Operation Uvda 9 March 1949

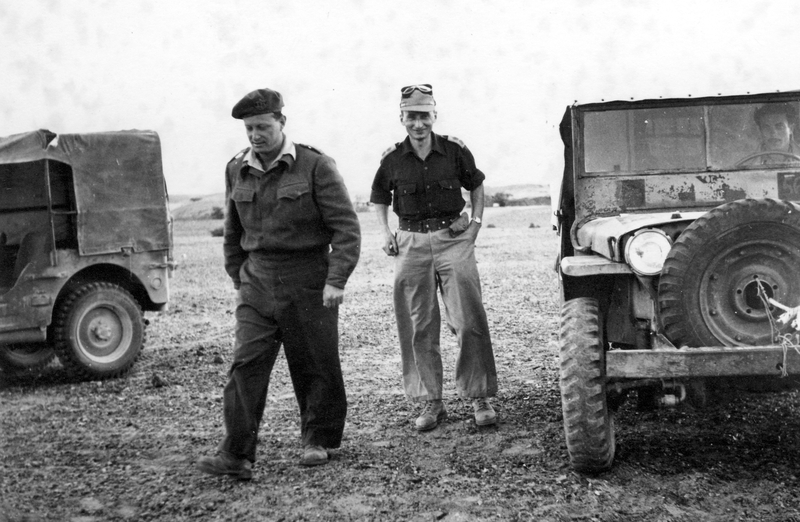
Yigal Allon (left) and Nahum Spiegel during Operation Uvda

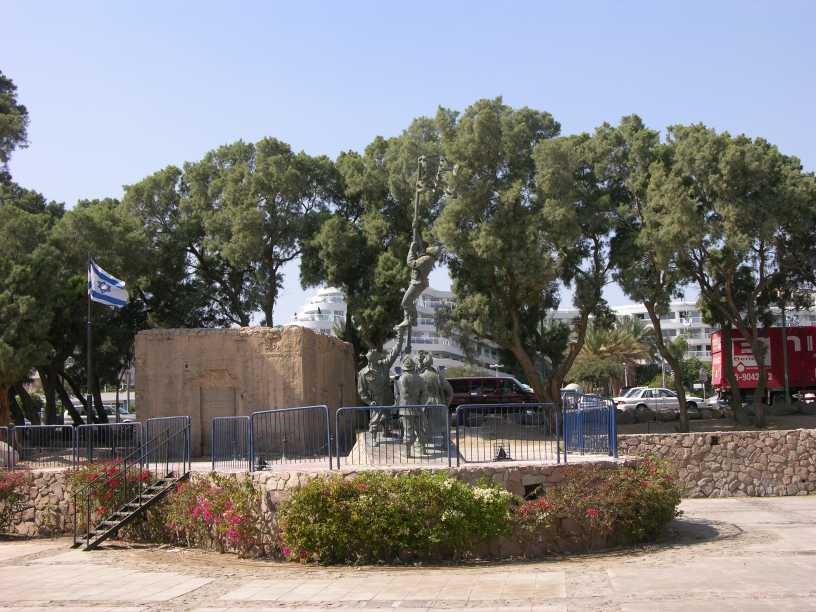
Historical model of the police station at Umm Rashrash

== See also ==
- Uvda (Israel)
- Ovda Airbase
- Operation Horev
