= HaMahanot HaOlim =

Israeli youth movement

HaMahanot HaOlim המחנות העולים
- Formation: 1926
- Type: Jewish Youth Movement
- Purpose: promoting social equality
- Members: Youth
- Website: www.hamahanot-haolim.org

HaMahanot HaOlim (Hebrew: המחנות העולים, lit. 'The Ascending (Making Aliyah) Camps') is an Israeli youth movement with a Zionist and socialist outlook. Founded in 1926, there are currently over fifty branches and over 10,000 members throughout Israel. HaMahanot HaOlim's stated aim is to better Israeli society by promoting social equality.

== History ==
The group began at the Herzliyah Gymnasium School in Herzliyah, Tel Aviv. In 1926, a group of 11 high school students formed an after-school group focused on realizing Zionist and socialist ideologies in Israel. Between the years 1926 and 1930, the group grew, spreading to Jerusalem, Haifa and other areas of Israel. During these years, various factions broke off to form or join other youth groups with varying focuses. In 1930, the group joined forces with the Legion of Scouts in Jerusalem, and in 1931 they formally established the national group, Hamahanot Haolim.

In June 2012, the group was expelled from the International Falcon Movement – Socialist Educational International "since they did not end their activities in the settlements in occupied Palestine".

== Activities ==
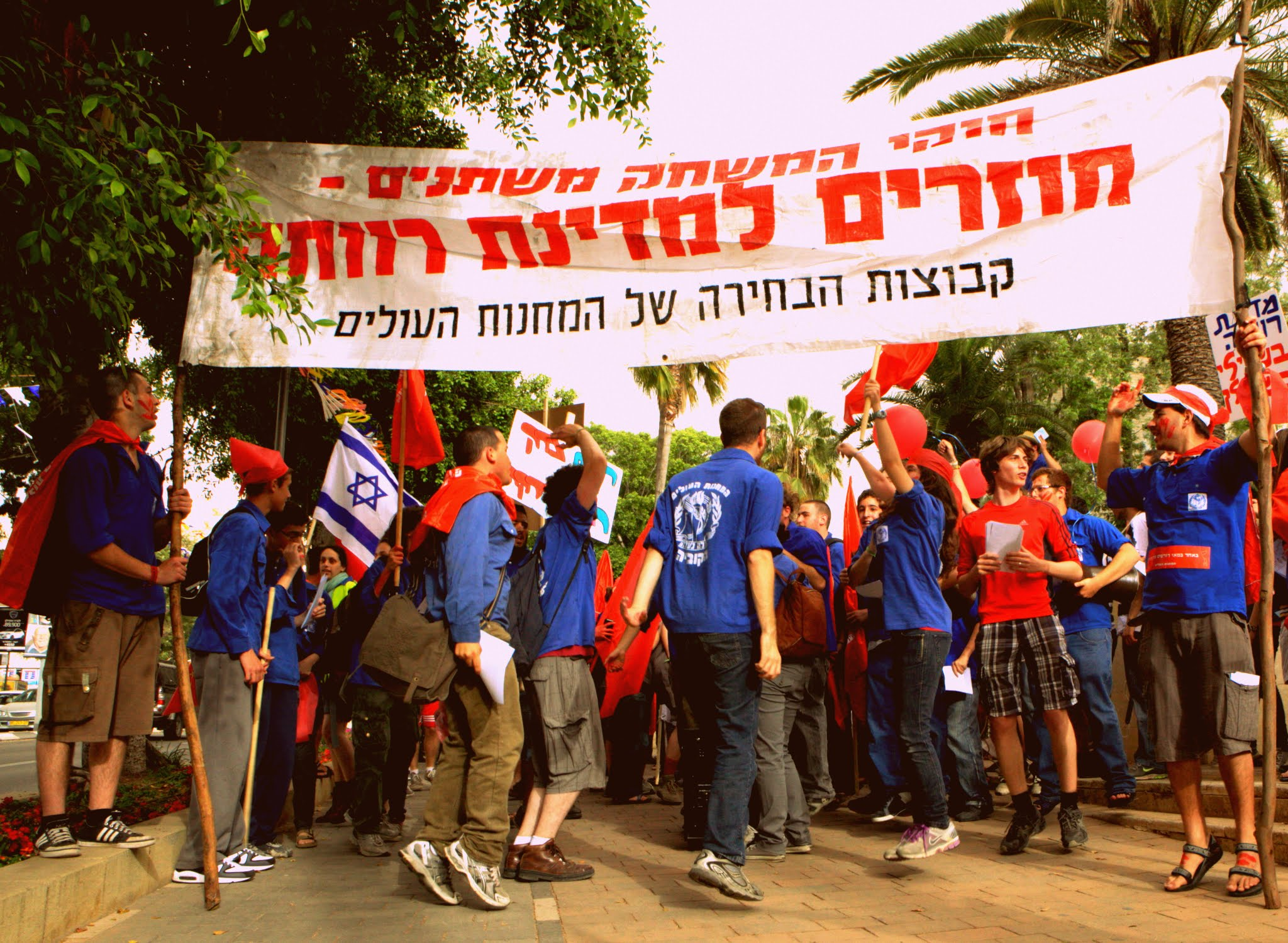
Hamahanot Haolim rally

In 1932, Hamahanot Haolim established Kibbutz Beit HaShita in the Harod Valley at the southeastern edge of the eastern part of the Jezreel Valley. Since then, it has established 41 other kibbutzim. In 1990, the group opened its first membership groups in kibbutzim.

Members are encouraged to take part in a wide variety of local, regional, and national activities such as community activities, seminars, hikes, and camping trips. They are also involved in international activities, such as a Holocaust remembrance trip to Poland.

Senior members of Hamahanot Haolim direct the activities at the various branches and the overall organization of the movement. Group leaders and senior members hold a National Conference once every four years. During the conference, they analyze past activities and discuss the implication of the present socio-political situation on future activities.
