= Uvda (Israel) =

Place in the Naqab

Coordinates: 29°56′19″N 34°56′13″E

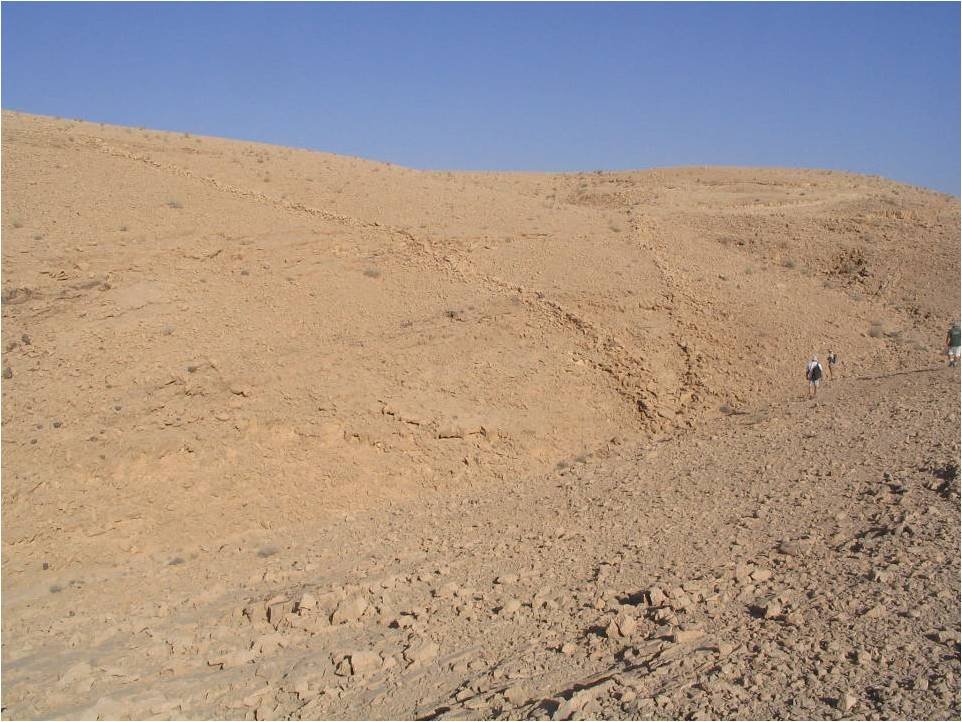
Desert kites in Uvda

Uvda (Hebrew: עובדה) is the name of a region in the southern Negev desert, directly north of Eilat in Israel.

The name derives from the Hebrew word uvda (meaning fact). The region was occupied during Operation Uvda in the 1948 Arab–Israeli War when the IDF entered the area with the stated aim of establishing 'facts on the ground', hence the name.

The Uvda Valley is known for the 7000-year-old Leopard Temple archaeological site.

== See also ==
- Ovda Airbase
- Ovda Airport
