= Amia Lieblich =

Israeli psychologist

Amia Lieblich (Hebrew: עמיה ליבליך; born 1939) is an Israeli psychologist and writer known for her work in qualitative research in psychology.

== Academic career ==
Lieblich is a professor emeritus from Hebrew University, where she has also served as dean of students. After she retired from Hebrew University she was a faculty member at the Academic College of Tel Aviv-Yafo for a few years. Lieblich heads the School of Society and the Arts at Ono Academic College.

Lieblich's research focuses on various aspects of Israeli society including military service, the Kibbutz movement, life stories of women, and the "new family" in Israel. She has written psychobiographies about creative women, among them Dvora Baron and Lea Goldberg. She has also co-edited, with Ruthellen Josselson and Dan P. McAdams, the eleven-book series "The Narrative Study of Lives."

== Published works (English) ==
- Tin Soldiers on Jerusalem Beach (Pantheon, 1978)
- Kibbutz Makom (Pantheon, 1981)
- Transition to Adulthood During Military Service (SUNY Press, 1989)
- Seasons of Captivity: the Inner World of POWs (NYU Press, 1994)
- Conversations with Dvora: An Experimental Biography of the First Modern Hebrew Woman Writer (UC Press, 1997)
- Narrative Research: Reading, Analysis, and Interpretation (With Rivka Tuval-Mashiach and Tamar Zilber, Sage, 1998)
- Learning about Lea (Athena, 2003)
- In spite of everything: The Story of a bi-national Community (2014)
- Seder Nashim: Sipurei Nashim Bamishpakha Hahadasha Beyisra'el
- Arak for Breakfast
