= Avraham Adan =

Israeli military officer and author

- אברהם אדן
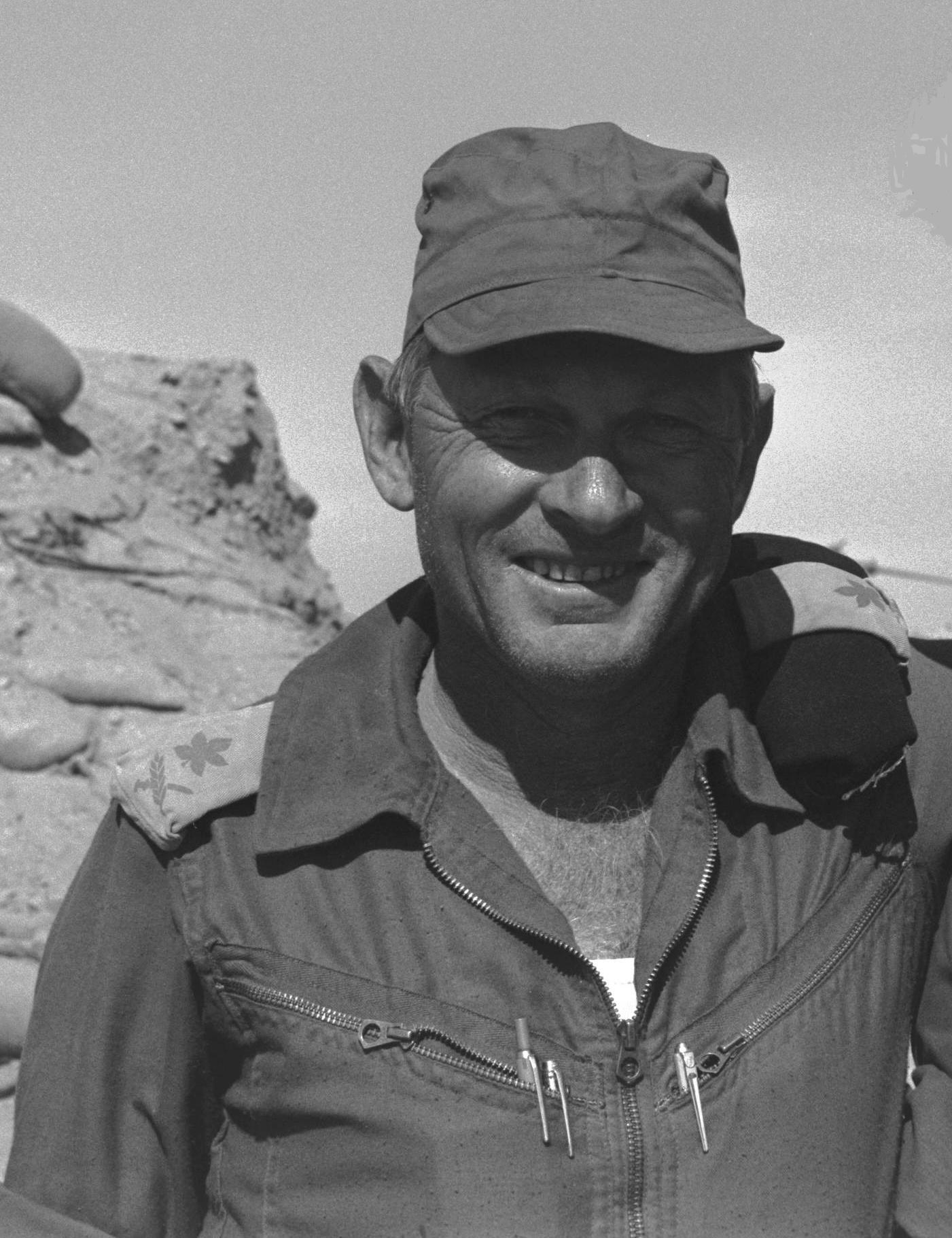
- Adan near the Suez Canal on 27 October 1973
- Born: 5 October 1926; Kfar Giladi, Mandatory Palestine
- Died: 28 September 2012 (aged 85); Ramat HaSharon, Israel
- Military career
- Allegiance: Israel
- Branch: Palmach; Israel Defense Forces
- Service years: 1943–1948 (Palmach); 1948–1977 (IDF)
- Rank: Aluf
- Nickname: Bren (ברן)
- Commands: 7th Armoured Brigade; Israeli Armoured Corps; 162nd Armoured Division; IDF Southern Command; Military attaché in Washington, D.C.
- Engagements: 1947–1949 Palestine war (1947–1949); 1948 Arab–Israeli War (1948–1949); Suez Crisis (1956); Six-Day War (1967); Yom Kippur War (1973)

Signature
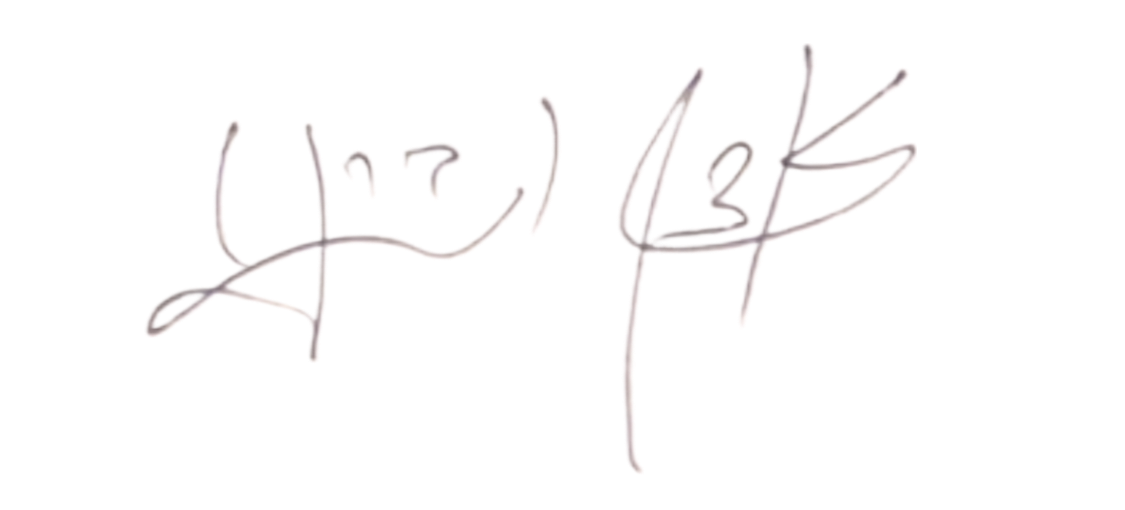

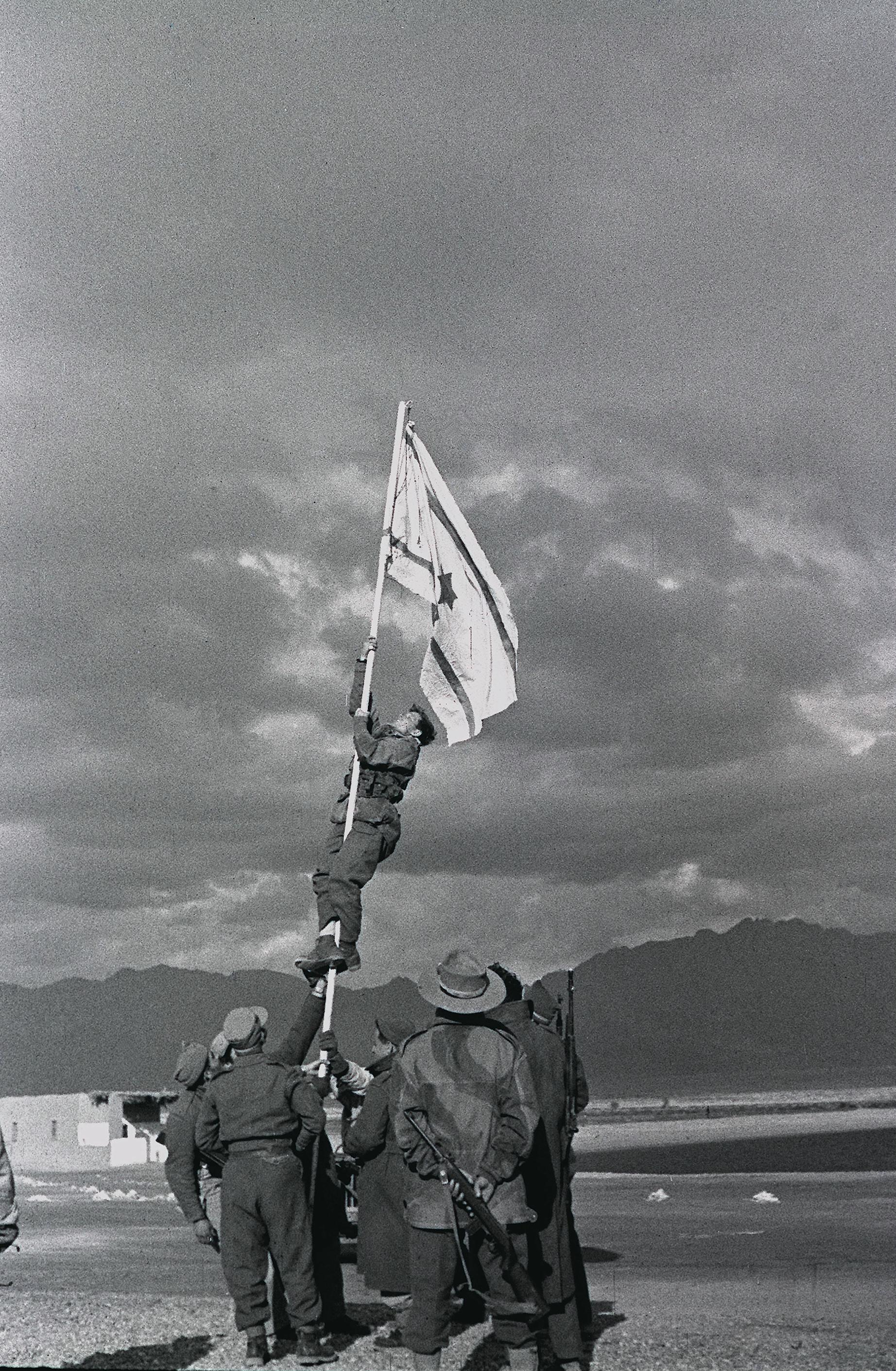
Adan (seen mounted on the flagpole) raising the Ink Flag in present-day Eilat at the end of the First Arab–Israeli War in March 1949

Avraham "Bren" Adan (Hebrew: אברהם "ברן" אדן; 5 October 1926 – 28 September 2012) was an Israeli major-general and author. Prior to Israel's independence, he served with the Palmach, an elite formation within the Haganah paramilitary force of the Yishuv community in British Mandatory Palestine. Adan fought under the Haganah and later under the newly formed Israel Defense Forces during the First Arab–Israeli War, and was photographed while raising the Israeli Ink Flag at the site of what is now Eilat to mark the end of the war. He served with the Israel Defense Forces from 1948 to 1977, and fought in all of the major Arab–Israeli wars that occurred during that period.

== Biography ==
Adan was born into a Jewish family on 5 October 1926 in Kfar Giladi, British Mandatory Palestine; he was born with the surname Eidelson, but later changed it to Adan as part of a Hebraization process. He attended Tichon Hadash high school in Tel Aviv. In 1943, he joined the Palmach, an elite force of the Haganah paramilitary organization that operated on part of the Yishuv community in British Palestine. During the First Arab–Israeli War, Adan was a company commander in the 8th battalion of the Negev Brigade, and participated in Operation Uvda, in which the brigade successfully captured the Jordanian-held outpost of Umm al-Rashrash—now known as Eilat—at the southernmost tip of the newly created country. Adan, then a captain in the newly formed Israel Defense Forces (IDF), was photographed while raising the Ink Flag of the State of Israel at the site. The photograph has since become an icon, and has been compared to Raising the Flag on Iwo Jima, an iconic photograph in which six United States Marines are raising the American flag atop Mount Suribachi during the Battle of Iwo Jima in World War II.

In 1949, Adan joined the Israeli Armoured Corps and founded the first M4 Sherman tank unit of the IDF. During the Suez Crisis of 1956, he commanded the 82nd battalion of the 7th Armoured Brigade in the Sinai Peninsula, decisively defeating Egyptian forces in the region. After the war, Adan became the operations officer of the Armoured Corps and later the commander of the 7th Armoured Brigade as well as the Armoured Corps School. During the Third Arab–Israeli War, he was the deputy commander of the Armoured Corps and of the 31st Armoured Division, where he once again engaged Egyptian forces in the Sinai. On 10 March 1969, he became the commander of the Armoured Corps.

Adan was defending the northern portion of the Suez Canal in the Sinai—occupied by Israel in its entirety during the 1967 war—when the Fourth Arab–Israeli War broke out in October 1973. During the war, he served as the commander of the 162nd Division, which suffered severe losses from 6–8 October during repeated attempts to stop the Egyptian assault and push Egyptian forces back across the canal. Later during the war, Adan led his unit across the canal and into Egyptian territory north of the Great Bitter Lake during Operation Stouthearted Men, and subsequently maneuvered his forces southward to Suez City, where they tried to surrounded the Egyptian Third Army, But subsequently suffered heavy losses in the Suez City ambush failed to capture it.

From 1974 to 1977, he served as the military attaché at the Embassy of Israel in Washington, D.C.

Adan was a co-founder of the kibbutzim of Nirim and Gvulot, located in the Negev Desert near the Palestinian Gaza Strip.

== Published works ==
- On Both Banks of the Suez (1979) – Idanim Publishing
- Up to the Ink Flag (1984) – Ministry of Defense Publishing
