= Kafra, Baysan =

Kafra كفرة
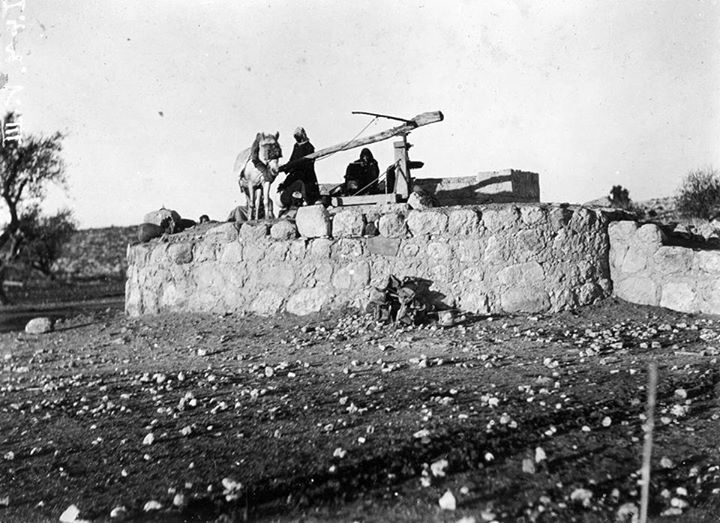
- Kafra well, ca 1920
- Etymology: "The village"
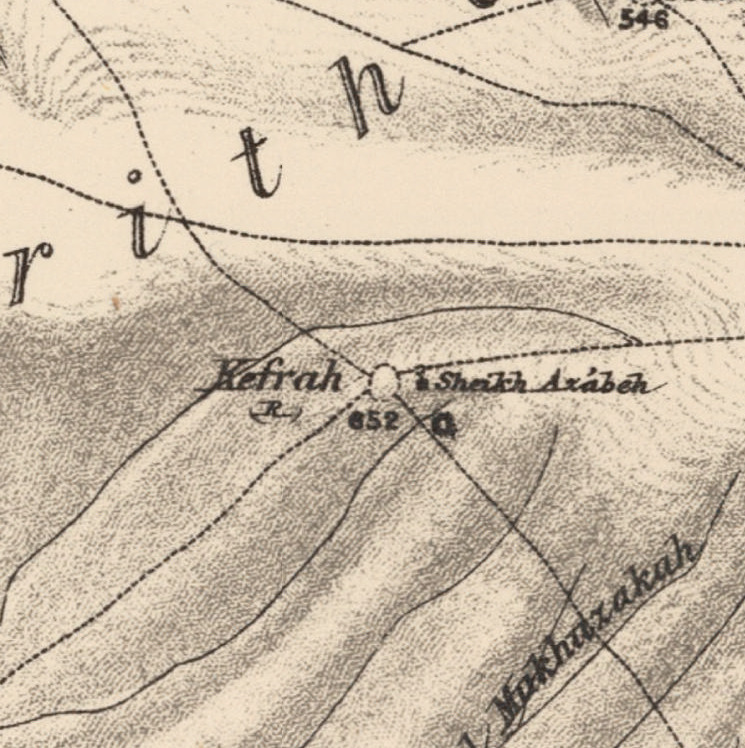
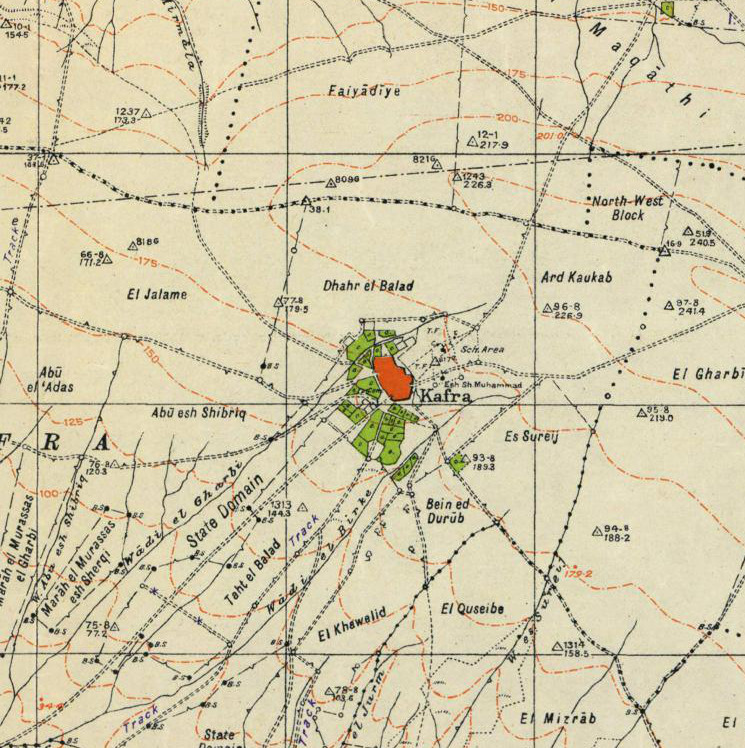
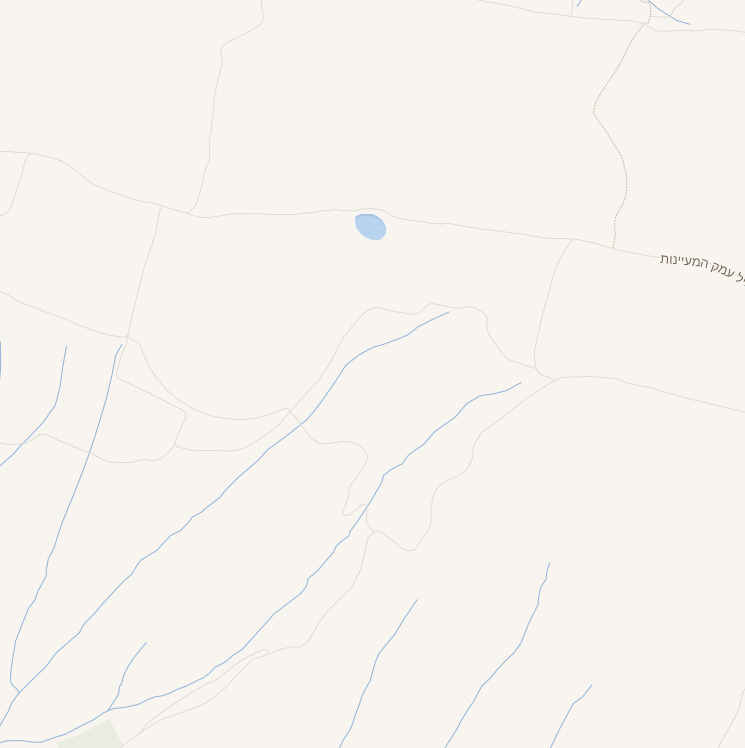
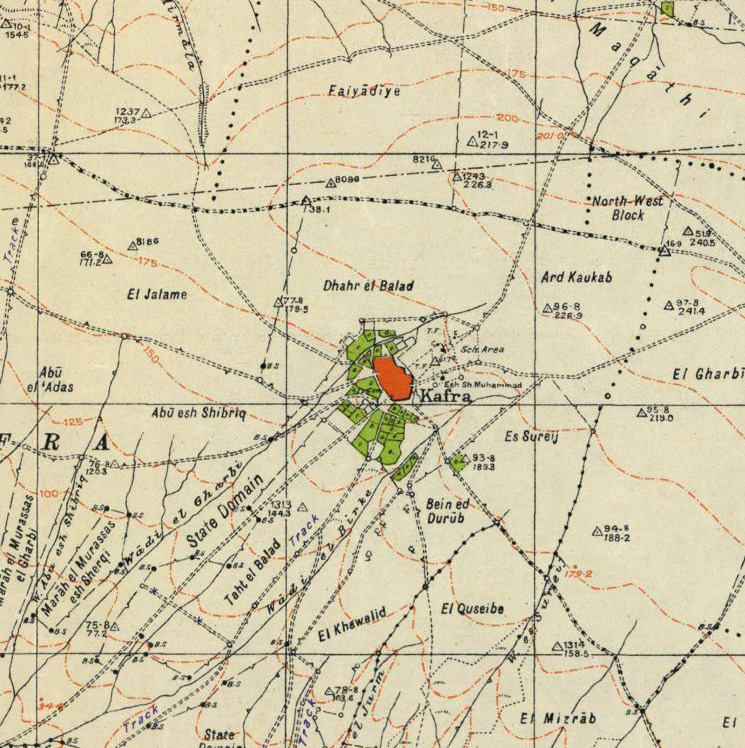
- 1870s map 1940s map modern map 1940s with modern overlay map

- Location within Mandatory Palestine
- Coordinates: 32°35′35″N 35°29′27″E
- Palestine grid: 196/222
- Geopolitical entity: Mandatory Palestine
- Subdistrict: Baysan
- Date of depopulation: May 16, 1948

Area
  - Total: 9,172 dunams (9.172 km^{2}; 3.541 sq mi)

Population (1945)
  - Total: 430
- Cause(s) of depopulation: Influence of nearby town's fall

Kafra (Arabic: كفرة), was a Palestinian Arab village located 10.5 kilometres north of Baysan. Built along both sides of the Wadi Kafra, the village had been known by this name since at least the time of the Crusades. It was depopulated by the Israel Defense Forces during the 1948 Palestine War on May 16, 1948.

== History ==
Adolf Neubauer connected it with a place mentioned in the Talmud, called Kefra.

The archaeological discoveries in Kafra include a stele inscribed in Hebrew or Aramaic, with the name "Zebediah son of Zuzi," written using the Jewish script. Discovered near an unexcavated building, believed to a synagogue with a mosaic, the stele is currently housed in the Sturman Museum at Ein Harod.

The Crusaders spelled it Cafra.

=== Ottoman era ===
In 1870/1871 (1288 AH), an Ottoman census listed the village in the nahiya (sub-district) of Shafa al-Shamali.

In 1875, Victor Guérin visited and found many basalt ruins, but the village itself was deserted.

In 1882, the PEF's Survey of Western Palestine described the village as being "a ruined village with traces of antiquity. Dr. Tristram mentions it as inhabited in 1866, and containing drafted masonry, but the ruins do not appear important."

=== British mandate era ===
In the 1922 census of Palestine, conducted by the Mandatory Palestine authorities, Kafra had a population of 273; all Muslims, increasing slightly in the 1931 census to 298; all Muslims except 1 Christian, in a total of 81 houses.

In the 1945 statistics, the population was 430 Muslims, with a total of 9,172 dunams of land. Of this, 36 dunams were for plantations and irrigated land, 7,284 for cereals, while 18 were built-up land.

== Bibliography ==
- Barron, J. B., ed. (1923). Palestine: Report and General Abstracts of the Census of 1922. Government of Palestine.
- Conder, C.R.; Kitchener, H.H. (1882). The Survey of Western Palestine: Memoirs of the Topography, Orography, Hydrography, and Archaeology. Vol. 2. London: Committee of the Palestine Exploration Fund.
- Department of Statistics (1945). Village Statistics, April, 1945. Government of Palestine.
- Guérin, V. (1880). Description Géographique Historique et Archéologique de la Palestine (in French). Vol. 3: Galilee, pt. 1. Paris: L'Imprimerie Nationale.
- Hadawi, S. (1970). Village Statistics of 1945: A Classification of Land and Area ownership in Palestine. Palestine Liberation Organization Research Center.
- Khalidi, W. (1992). All That Remains:The Palestinian Villages Occupied and Depopulated by Israel in 1948. Washington D.C.: Institute for Palestine Studies. ISBN 0-88728-224-5.
- Mills, E., ed. (1932). Census of Palestine 1931. Population of Villages, Towns and Administrative Areas. Jerusalem: Government of Palestine.
- Morris, B. (2004). The Birth of the Palestinian Refugee Problem Revisited. Cambridge University Press. ISBN 978-0-521-00967-6.
- Neubauer, A. (1868). La géographie du Talmud : mémoire couronné par l'Académie des inscriptions et belles-lettres (in French). Paris: Lévy.
- Palmer, E.H. (1881). The Survey of Western Palestine: Arabic and English Name Lists Collected During the Survey by Lieutenants Conder and Kitchener, R. E. Transliterated and Explained by E.H. Palmer. Committee of the Palestine Exploration Fund.
