= Jenin Subdistrict, Mandatory Palestine =

Administrative division of British Palestine (1920–1948)

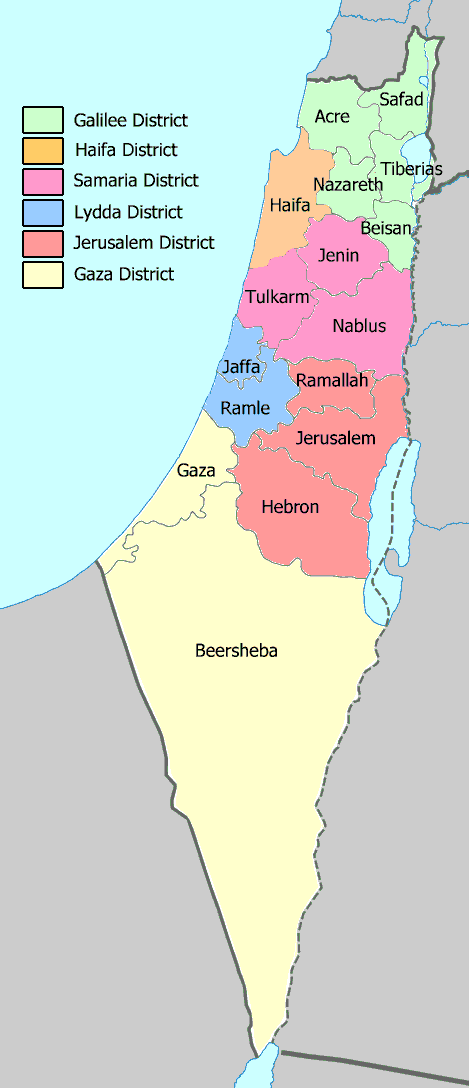
Subdistricts grouped by districts in 1945. Samaria District with Jenin Subdistrict in purple.

The Jenin Subdistrict was one of the subdistricts of Mandatory Palestine. It was located around the city of Jenin. After the 1948 Arab–Israeli War, the district disintegrated.

== Towns and villages ==
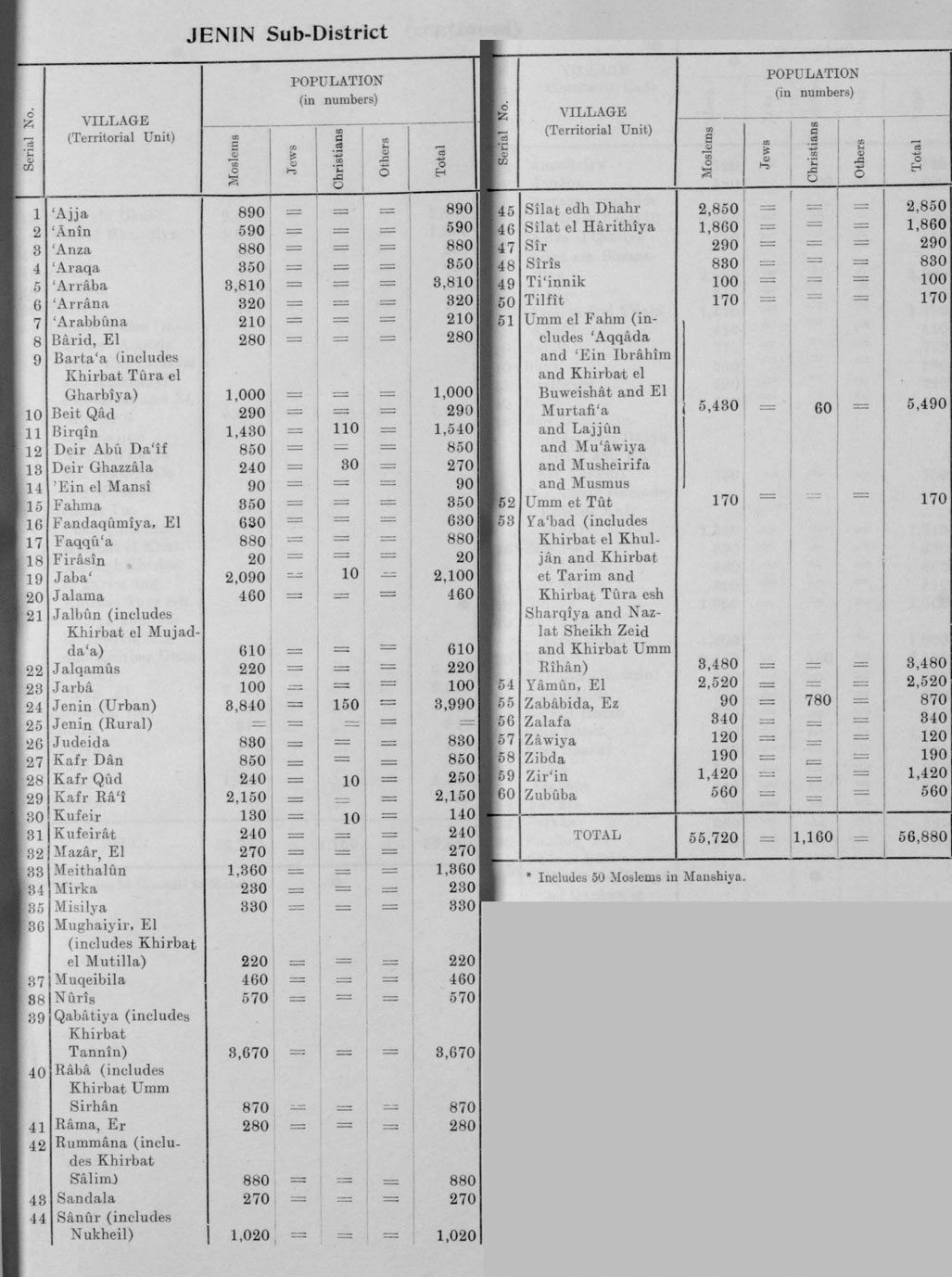
Official population statistics for the sub-district, from Village Statistics, 1945.

Jenin Sub-District – Population by Village
Village	Muslims	Jews	Christians	Others	Total
‘Ajja	890				890
‘Anin	590				590
Anza	880				880
‘Araqa	350				350
‘Arraba	3,810				3,810
‘Arrana	320				320
‘Arabbuna	210				210
Barid (El)	280				280
Barta‘a (includes Khirbat Tura el Gharbiya)	1,000				1,000
Beit Qad	290				290
Birqin	1,430		110		1,540
Deir Abu Da‘if	850				850
Deir Ghazala	240		30		270
‘Ein el Mansi	90				90
Fahma	350				350
Fandaqumiya (El)	630				630
Faqu‘a	880				880
Frasin	20				20
Jaba‘	2,090		10		2,100
Jalama	460				460
Jalbun (includes Khirbat el Mujadd‘a)	610				610
Jalamus	220				220
Jarba‘	100				100
Jenin (Urban)	3,840		150		3,990
Jenin (Rural)					
Judeida	830				830
Kafr Dan	850				850
Kafr Qud	240		10		250
Kafr Ra‘i	2,150				2,150
Kufeir	130		10		140
Kufreith	240				240
Mazra‘a (El)	270				270
Meithalun	1,360				1,360
Mirka	230				230
Misilya	330				330
Mughaiyir (El) (includes Khirbat el Mutila)	220				220
Muqeible	460				460
Nuris	570				570
Qabatiya (includes Khirbat Tannin)	3,670				3,670
Raba‘a (includes Khirbat Umm Sirhan)	870				870
Rama (Er)	280				280
Rummana (includes Khirbat Salim)	880				880
Sandala	270				270
Sanur (includes Nukheil)	1,020				1,020
Silat edh Dhahr	2,850				2,850
Silat el Harithiya	1,860				1,860
Sir	290				290
Siris	830				830
Ti‘innik	100				100
Tilfit	170				170
Umm el Fahm (includes ‘Aqqada, ‘Ein Ibrahim, Khirbat el Buweishat, El Murtafi‘a, Lajjun, Mu‘awiya, Musheirifa and Musmus)	5,430		60		5,490
Umm et Tut	170				170
Ya‘bad (includes Khirbat el Khuljan, Khirbat et Tarim, Khirbat Tura esh Sharqiya, Nazlat Sheikh Zeid and Khirbat Umm Rihan)	3,480				3,480
Yamun (El)	2,520				2,520
Zabubida (Ez)	90		780		870
Zalafa	340				340
Zawiya	120				120
Zibda	190				190
Zir‘in	1,420				1,420
Zububa	560				560
TOTAL	55,720	—	1,160	—	56,880

=== Depopulated towns and villages ===
(current localities in parentheses)

- Ayn al-Mansi
- Khirbat al-Jawfa (Ma'ale Gilboa)
- Lajjun (Megiddo)
- Al-Mazar (Gan Nir, Meytav, Perazon)
- Nuris (Nurit)
- Zir'in (Yizra'el)
