= Yizre'el RC =

Yizre'el Rugby Club
- Nickname(s): Boykies (The Boys)
- Founded: 1967
- Location: Yizre'el, Israel
- Coach(es): Alexander Tkachenko
1st kit	2nd kit

Yizre'el Rugby Club is an Israeli amateur rugby club based in Yizre'el.

== History ==
The club was founded in 1967 by a group mainly consisting of South Africans. The nickname likely refers to those origins: the '-kies' suffix (pronounced roughly like 'keys') is possibly from an Afrikaans part of speech indicating diminutive, though in most cases in Afrikaans it is spelled -tjies.

== Honours ==
- Israeli Rugby Union Championship
  - 2013
- Israeli Rugby Union Cup
  - 2013
