= Farhan al-Sa'di =

Palestinian rebel (c.1862–1937)

Farhan al-Saadi
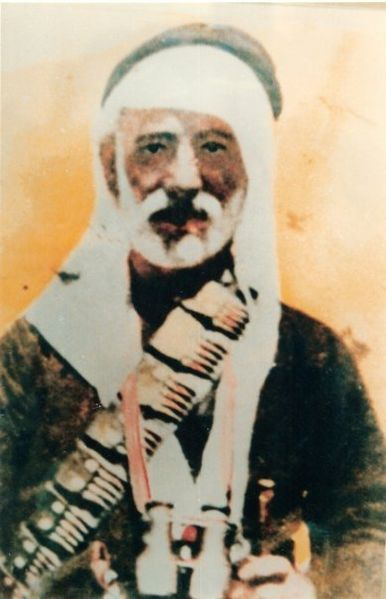
- Born: 1862 al-Mazar, Ottoman Empire
- Died: 27 November 1937 (aged 75); Acre Prison, Acre, Mandatory Palestine
- Cause of death: Execution by hanging
- Known for: 1936–1939 Arab revolt in Palestine

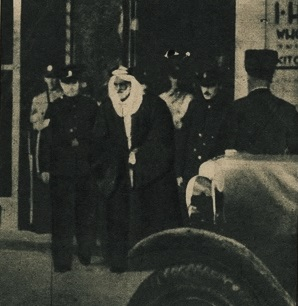
Al-Sa'di following his arrest by British Mandatory police, 1937. He was later executed.

Sheikh Farhan al-Saadi (circa 1862 – 27 November 1937) was a Palestinian rebel commander and revolutionary who rose to prominence during the 1936–1939 Arab revolt in Palestine. He participated in national conferences and demonstrations against the British Mandate of Palestine in the 1929 Palestine riots. He is thought to have been the first to use a weapon during the revolt.

Sa'adi was at one point imprisoned by the British authorities. When he was released from prison, he moved to Haifa where he met Sheikh Izz al-Din al-Qassam and joined his organisation. On 15 April 1936, a group called Ikhwan al-Qassam under al-Sa'di's leadership ambushed a bus on the Nablus-Tulkarm road. Two Jewish passengers were taken off the bus and fatally shot. This incident is seen as the starting point of the 1936–1939 Arab Revolt. For the many operations against the British, he was sentenced to death for carrying a single bullet. Sa'adi was executed on 27 November 1937, at the age of 75 during the Ramadan fast.
