= Ayn al-Mansi =

Ayn al-Mansi عين المنسي 'Ein al-Mansi
- Etymology: el Mensi= "the forgotten"
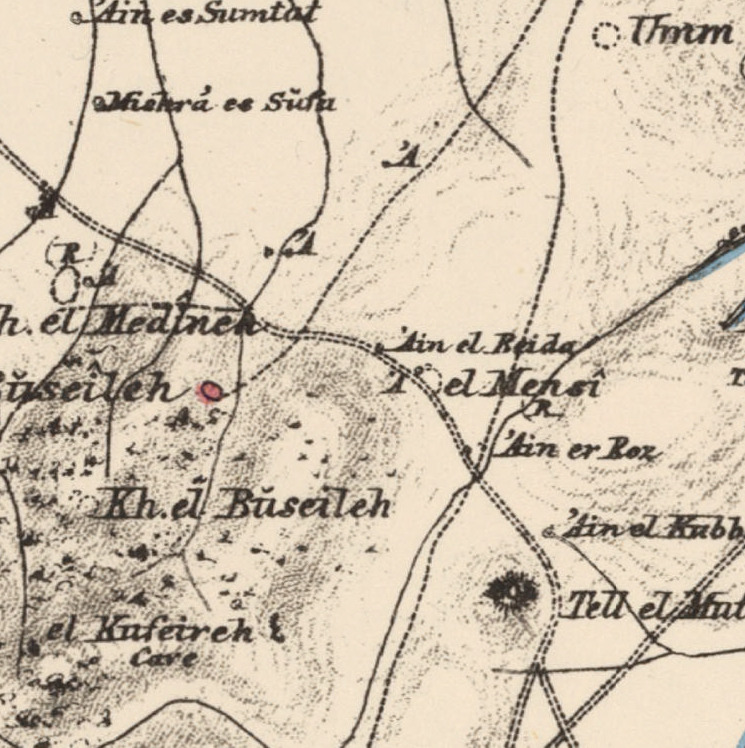
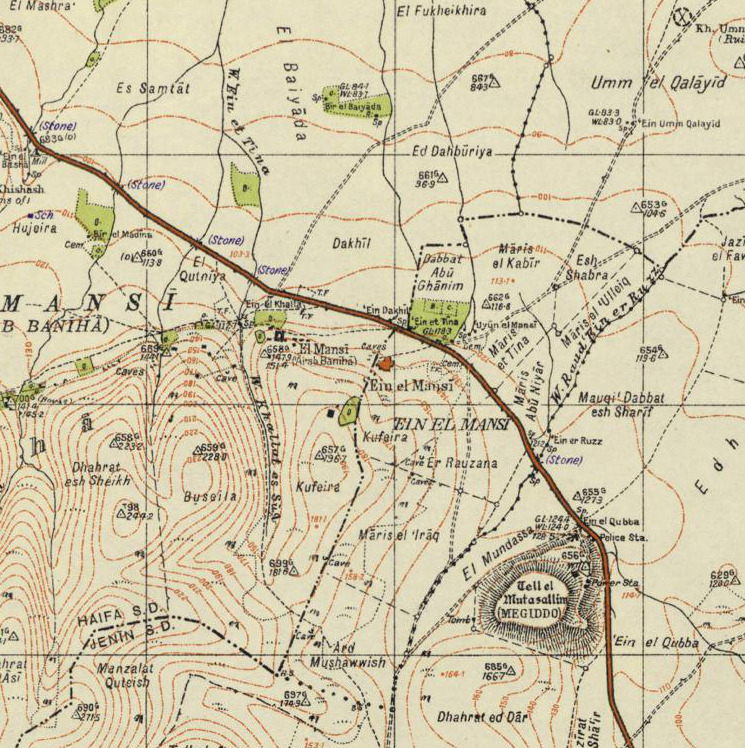
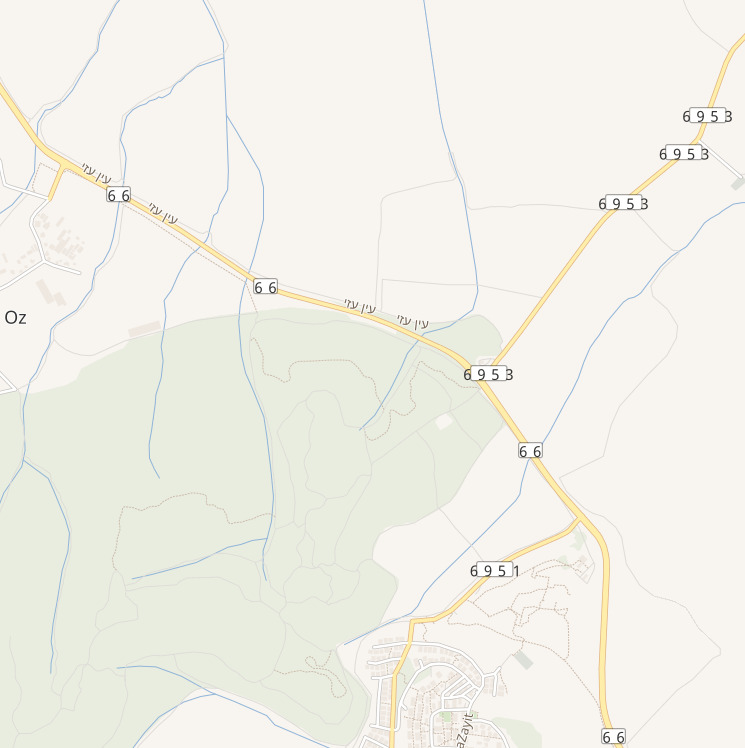
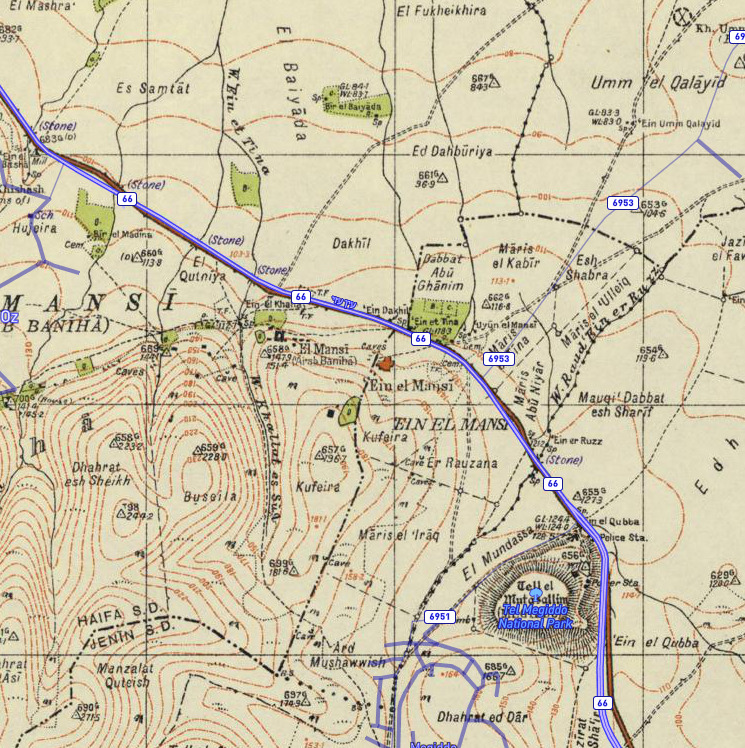
- 1870s map 1940s map modern map 1940s with modern overlay map A series of historical maps of the area around Ayn al-Mansi (click the buttons)

- Location within Mandatory Palestine
- Coordinates: 32°35′36″N 35°10′38″E
- Palestine grid: 166/222
- Geopolitical entity: Mandatory Palestine
- Subdistrict: Jenin
- Date of depopulation: mid-April 1948

Area
  - Total: 1,295 dunams (1.295 km^{2}; 0.500 sq mi)

Population (1945)
  - Total: 90
- Cause(s) of depopulation: Military assault by Yishuv forces

Ayn al-Mansi (Arabic: عين المنسي, Ein el Mansî) was a Palestinian Arab village in the District of Jenin of the Mandatory Palestine. It was depopulated as a result of a military attack in mid-April during the 1947–48 Civil War in Mandatory Palestine.

== History ==
During the 19th and first half of the 20th century, Ayn al-Mansi was one of the settlements of the so-called "Fahmawi Commonwealth" established by Hebronite clans belonging to Umm al-Fahm. The Commonwealth consisted of a network of interspersed communities connected by ties of kinship, and socially, economically and politically affiliated with Umm al Fahm. The Commonwealth dominated vast sections of Bilad al-Ruha/Ramot Menashe, Wadi 'Ara and Marj Ibn 'Amir/Jezreel Valley during that time.

In the 1882 the PEF's Survey of Western Palestine (SWP) described El Mensi as: "A small ruined village, with springs."

=== British Mandate era ===
In the 1931 census of Palestine, conducted by the British Mandate authorities, Ein el Mansi had 73 Muslim inhabitants, in a total of 15 houses.

In addition to agriculture, residents practiced animal husbandry which formed was an important source of income for the town. In 1943, they owned 13 heads of cattle, 2 horses, 10 donkeys, 270 fowls, and 10 pigeons.

In the 1945 Village Statistics, Ayn al-Mansi's population was estimated at 90 Muslims, and the jurisdiction of the village was 1,295 dunams of land. Of this, 186 dunams were used for plantations and irrigable land, 868 dunams were used for cereals, while 2 dunams were built-up (urban) land.

=== 1948 and aftermath ===
Ayn al-Mansi became depopulated after Military assault in mid-April 1948.

== Bibliography ==
- Conder, C.R.; Kitchener, H.H. (1882). The Survey of Western Palestine: Memoirs of the Topography, Orography, Hydrography, and Archaeology. Vol. 2. London: Committee of the Palestine Exploration Fund.
- Government of Palestine, Department of Statistics (1945). Village Statistics, April, 1945.
- Hadawi, S. (1970). Village Statistics of 1945: A Classification of Land and Area ownership in Palestine. Palestine Liberation Organization Research Center.
- Khalidi, W. (1992). All That Remains: The Palestinian Villages Occupied and Depopulated by Israel in 1948. Washington D.C.: Institute for Palestine Studies. ISBN 0-88728-224-5.
- Mills, E., ed. (1932). Census of Palestine 1931. Population of Villages, Towns and Administrative Areas. Jerusalem: Government of Palestine.
- Morris, B. (2004). The Birth of the Palestinian Refugee Problem Revisited. Cambridge University Press. ISBN 978-0-521-00967-6.
- Palmer, E.H. (1881). The Survey of Western Palestine: Arabic and English Name Lists Collected During the Survey by Lieutenants Conder and Kitchener, R. E. Transliterated and Explained by E.H. Palmer. Committee of the Palestine Exploration Fund.
