= Nuris =

Nuris نورِس Noori
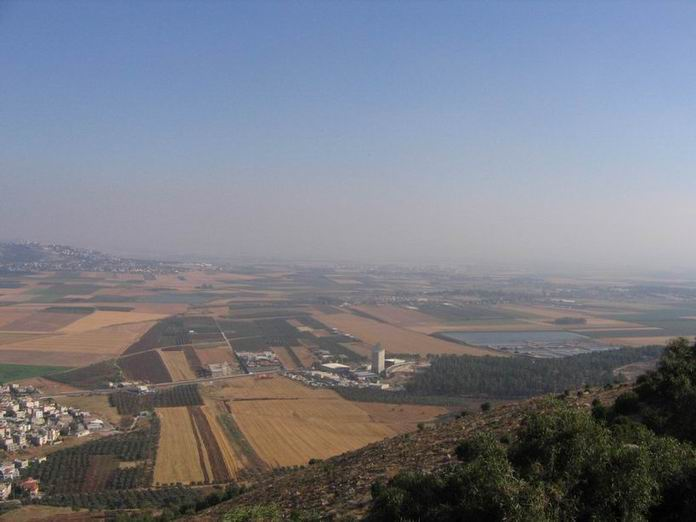
- The Jezreel Valley today
- Etymology: from personal name
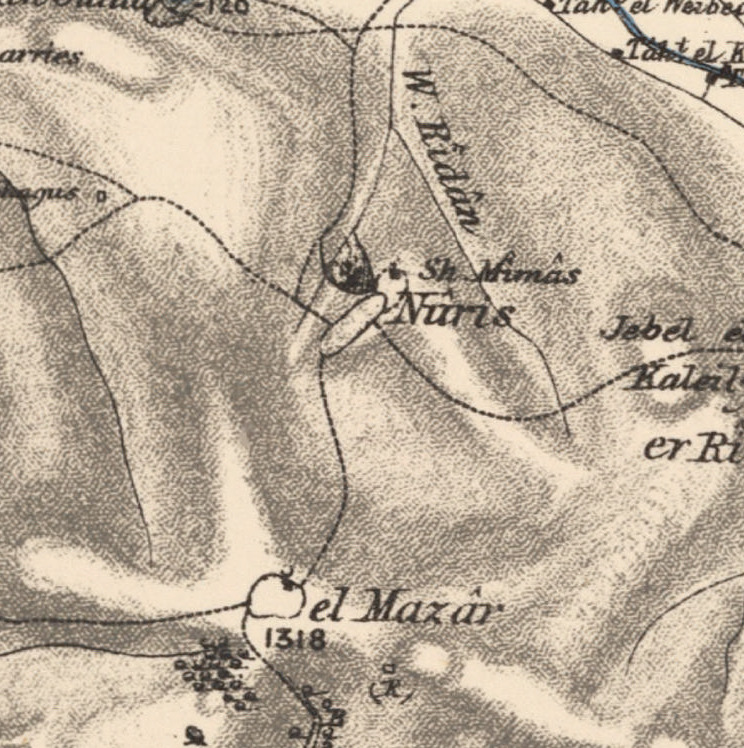
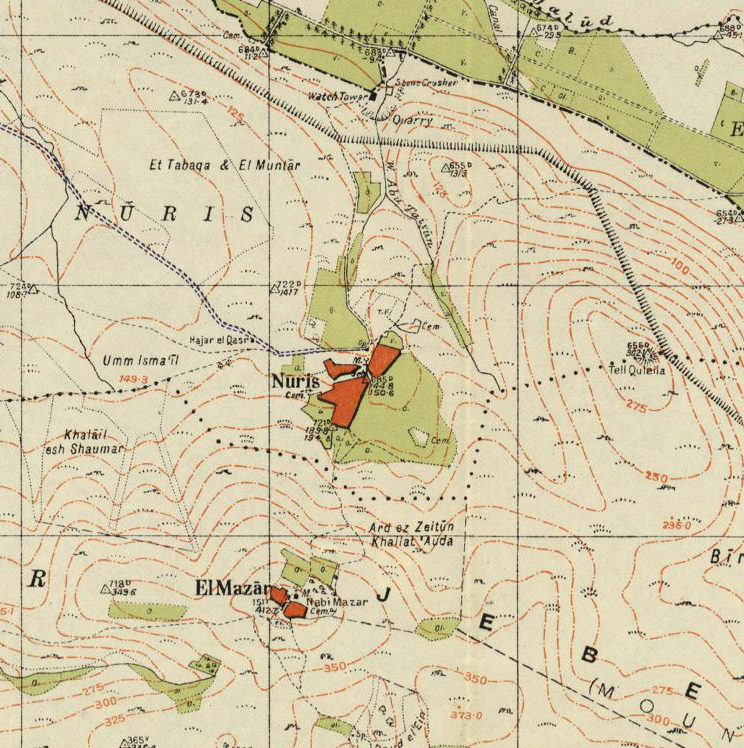
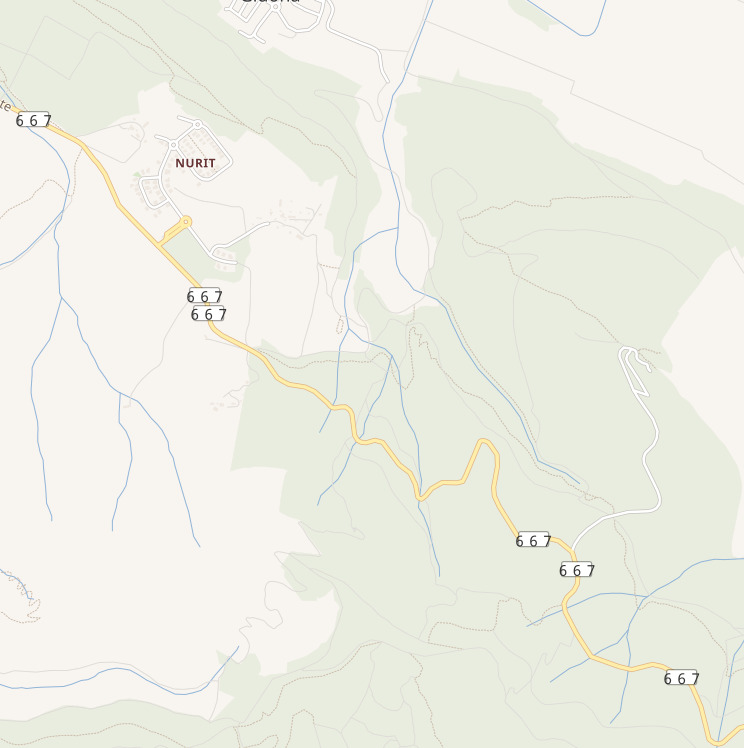
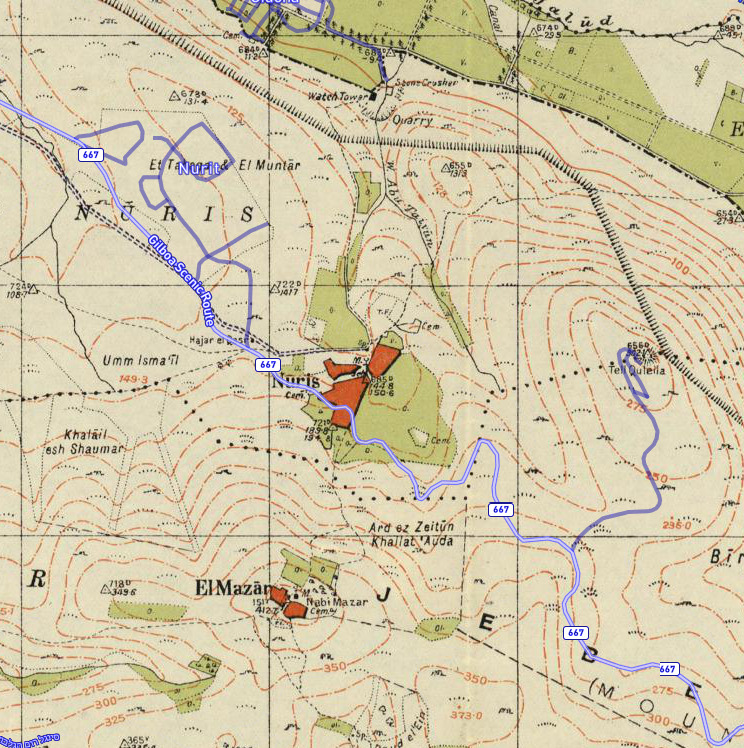
- 1870s map 1940s map modern map 1940s with modern overlay map A series of historical maps of the area around Nuris (click the buttons)

- Location within Mandatory Palestine
- Coordinates: 32°32′06″N 35°21′49″E
- Palestine grid: 184/215
- Geopolitical entity: Mandatory Palestine
- Subdistrict: Jenin
- Date of depopulation: May 29–30, 1948

Area
  - Total: 6,256 dunams (6.256 km^{2}; 2.415 sq mi)

Population (1945)
  - Total: 570
- Cause(s) of depopulation: Military assault by Yishuv forces
- Secondary cause: Fear of being caught up in the fighting

Nuris (Arabic: نورِس) was a Palestinian Arab village in the District of Jenin. In 1945, Nuris had 570 inhabitants. It was depopulated during the 1948 War on 29 May 1948 under Operation Gideon. The Israeli moshav of Nurit was built on Nuris' village land in 1950.

== Location ==
Nuris was located in the Jezreel Valley, 9 kilometers (5.6 mi) northeast of Jenin and southwest of the Jezreel Valley railway. It was linked by dirt roads to the villages of Zir'in and Al-Mazar.

There were several springs north of Nuris, most importantly the 'Ain Jalut, one of the largest in Palestine.

== History ==
Remains from the Bronze Age have been found here, as has pottery from the Byzantine era.

Nuris was referred to by the Crusaders as "Nurith." Nearby, the Mamluks defeated the Mongols in the Battle of Ain Jalut (1260).

=== Ottoman era ===
In 1517, the village was included in the Ottoman Empire with the rest of Palestine. During the 16th and 17th centuries, it belonged to the Turabay Emirate (1517-1683), which encompassed also the Jezreel Valley, Haifa, Jenin, Beit She'an Valley, northern Jabal Nablus, Bilad al-Ruha/Ramot Menashe, and the northern part of the Sharon plain.

In the 1596 tax-records Nuris appeared part of the nahiya (subdistrict) of Jenin under the liwa' (district) of Lajjun, with a population of 16 Muslim households; an estimated 88 persons. They paid a fixed tax rate of 25% on a number of products, including wheat, barley, olives, and goats and beehives; a total of 7,500 akçe.

The village was captured and burned by Napoleon's troops, after the Battle of Mount Tabor in 1799. Pierre Jacotin named the village Noures on his map from that campaign.

British traveller James Silk Buckingham visited the site in the early 19th century. Buckingham remarked that there were several other settlements in sight, "all inhabited by Mohammedans." In 1838 Edward Robinson noted Nuris during his travels in the region, located in the District of Jenin, also called "Haritheh esh-Shemaliyeh".

In 1870/1871 (1288 AH), an Ottoman census listed the village in the nahiya (sub-district) of Shafa al-Qibly.

In 1882, the PEF's Survey of Western Palestine described the village as being small, situated on rocky ground, much hidden between the hills, about 600 ft (180 m) above a valley. Nuris had an elementary school for boys, which was founded under the Ottomans in 1888, and a mosque. Some ancient ruins remained unexplored as of 1992.

=== British Mandate era ===
In the 1922 census of Palestine, conducted by the British Mandate authorities, Nuris had a population of 364, all Muslims.

Part of the area was acquired by the Jewish community as part of the Sursock Purchase. In 1921, the village reportedly had 38 tenant families, and 224 people out of a total population of 364 (1922 census) cultivated 5,500 dunums out of a village area of 27,018. That year, the Sursock family sold some of the village lands to the Palestine Land Development Company. A group of 35 young Jews began to farm the land, which became the core of Kibbutz Ein Harod.

Some of the villagers of Nuris received monetary compensation and left the village. Those who remained leased a block of land for a period of six years with the opportunity to purchase when the lease expired. They paid rental at 6% of the published sale offer on the land, but later, at the request of the farmers in Nuris, this was changed to one-fifth of the total yield in agricultural output of the land. After the original six-year lease was up, reports in 1928 showed that no villagers had bought the land leased to them. The leases were extended for three years while the ownership was transferred to the Jewish National Fund. In 1921 the average farmer cultivated 24 dunums, by 1929 this had drastically reduced to 4.4, although the population grew significantly. In the 1931 census, Nuris had a population of 429 people and a recorded 106 houses were located in the village.

In the 1945 statistics, Nuris had 570 Muslim inhabitants with 163 houses, although the area was much smaller than it had been before 1920, with an area of 6256 dunums. The inhabitants, were mainly employed in cereal farming, although some land was allocated to irrigation and growing olives.

=== 1948 War and aftermath ===
On 19 April 1948, Palmach headquarters ordered the destruction of "enemy bases at Al-Mazar, Nuris and Zir'in". Israeli historian Benny Morris notes that destroying the villages was "part and parcel" of the Haganah operations at this time, however, he also writes that Nuris was not finally depopulated until the end of May.

Following the war the area was incorporated into the State of Israel. A moshav, Nurit, was established to the northwest of the village site in 1950. Palestinian historian Walid Khalidi described the village in 1992: "The site, overgrown with pine and oak trees, is strewn with piles of stones. Part of the surrounding land is fenced in and is used as a grazing area, while another part is cultivated. Cactuses and olive and fig trees grow near the site."

== Bibliography ==
- Barron, J.B., ed. (1923). Palestine: Report and General Abstracts of the Census of 1922. Government of Palestine.
- Buckingham, J.S. (1821). Travels in Palestine Through the Countries of Bashan and Gilead, East of the River Jordan, Including a Visit to the Cities of Geraza and Gamala in the Decapolis. Longman, Hurst, Rees, Orme and Brown.
- Cline, E.H. (2002). The Battles of Armageddon: Megiddo and the Jezreel Valley from the Bronze Age to the Nuclear Age. University of Michigan Press. ISBN 0-472-06739-7.
- Conder, C.R.; Kitchener, H.H. (1882). The Survey of Western Palestine: Memoirs of the Topography, Orography, Hydrography, and Archaeology. Vol. 2. London: Committee of the Palestine Exploration Fund. p. 125
- Dauphin, C. (1998). La Palestine byzantine, Peuplement et Populations. BAR International Series 726 (in French). Vol. III: Catalogue. Oxford: Archeopress. ISBN 0-860549-05-4.
- Hadawi, S. (1970). Village Statistics of 1945: A Classification of Land and Area ownership in Palestine. Palestine Liberation Organization Research Center.
- Hütteroth, W.-D.; Abdulfattah, K. (1977). Historical Geography of Palestine, Transjordan and Southern Syria in the Late 16th Century. Erlanger Geographische Arbeiten, Sonderband 5. Erlangen, Germany: Vorstand der Fränkischen Geographischen Gesellschaft. ISBN 3-920405-41-2.
- Karmon, Y. (1960). "An Analysis of Jacotin's Map of Palestine" (PDF). Israel Exploration Journal. 10 (3, 4): 155–173, 244–253. Archived from the original (PDF) on 22 December 2019.
- Khalidi, W. (1992). All That Remains: The Palestinian Villages Occupied and Depopulated by Israel in 1948. Washington D.C.: Institute for Palestine Studies. ISBN 0-88728-224-5.
- Mills, E., ed. (1932). Census of Palestine 1931. Population of Villages, Towns and Administrative Areas. Jerusalem: Government of Palestine.
- Morris, B. (2004). The Birth of the Palestinian Refugee Problem Revisited. Cambridge University Press. ISBN 978-0-521-00967-6.
- Palmer, E.H. (1881). The Survey of Western Palestine: Arabic and English Name Lists Collected During the Survey by Lieutenants Conder and Kitchener, R. E. Transliterated and Explained by E.H. Palmer. Committee of the Palestine Exploration Fund.
- Robinson, E.; Smith, E. (1841). Biblical Researches in Palestine, Mount Sinai and Arabia Petraea: A Journal of Travels in the year 1838. Vol. 3. Boston: Crocker & Brewster.
- Stein, K.W. (1987). The Land Question in Palestine, 1917-1939. UNC Press. ISBN 0-8078-4178-1.
- Sternhell, Z. (2009). The founding myths of Israel: nationalism, socialism, and the making of the Jewish state. Princeton University Press. ISBN 978-1-400-82236-2.
- Sufian, Sandra (1993). Healing the Land and the Nation: Malaria and the Zionist Project in Palestine, 1920-1947. Chicago: University of Chicago Press. ISBN 0-226-77935-1.
- Tepper, Y. (7 July 2009). "Nuris" (121). Hadashot Arkheologiyot – Excavations and Surveys in Israel.
- Village Statistics, April, 1945. Government of Palestine, Department of Statistics. 1945.
