= Avraham (Pachi) Shapira =

Israeli scholar of secular Jewish culture

Avraham (Pachi) Shapira (Hebrew: אברהם שפירא; born 1935) is an Israeli scholar of secular Jewish culture. He was a professor of Jewish History at Tel Aviv University and editor of the kibbutz movement journal Shdemot.

== Biography ==
Avraham (Pachi) Shapira grew up in Haifa. He served in the Nahal brigade and eventually settled on Kibbutz Yizra'el where he had been stationed. He studied at Hebrew University of Jerusalem. Shapira was the co-editor of The Seventh Day: Soldiers' Talk About the Six-Day War with Amos Oz. He was one of the founders of a group of kibbutzniks who raised questions about Jewish and Israeli identity and their underlying values.
