= Al-Mazar, Jenin =

Al-Mazar المزار
- Village
- Etymology: "shrine", "a place one visits"
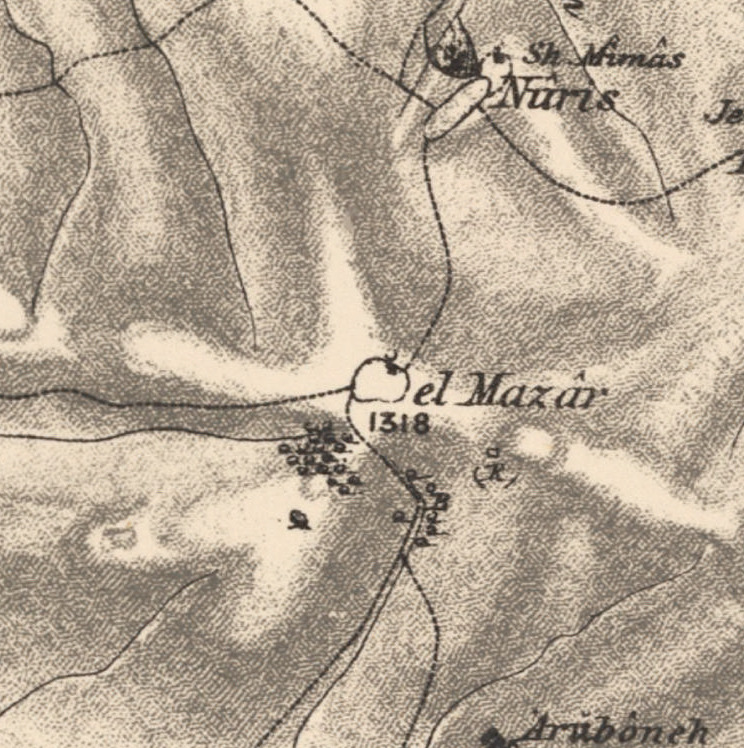
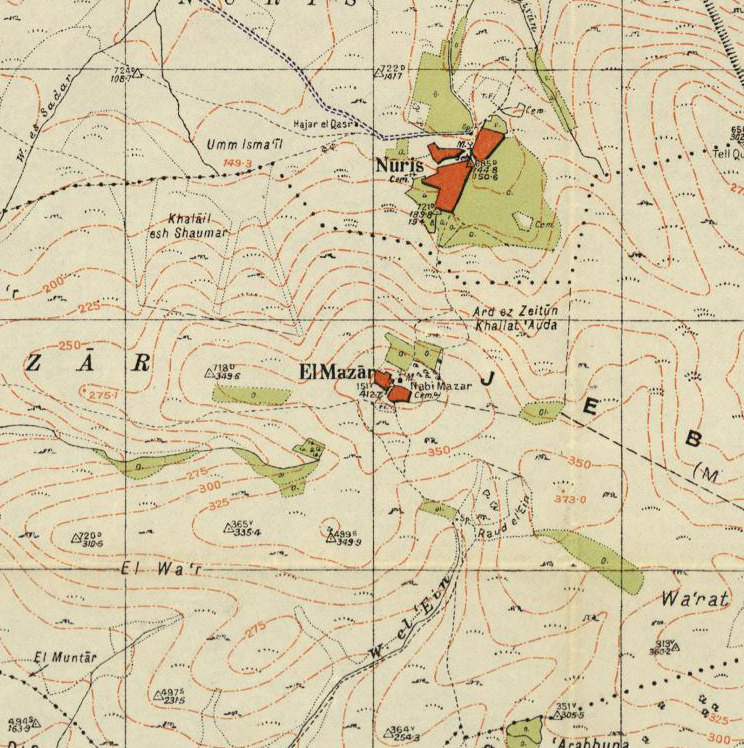
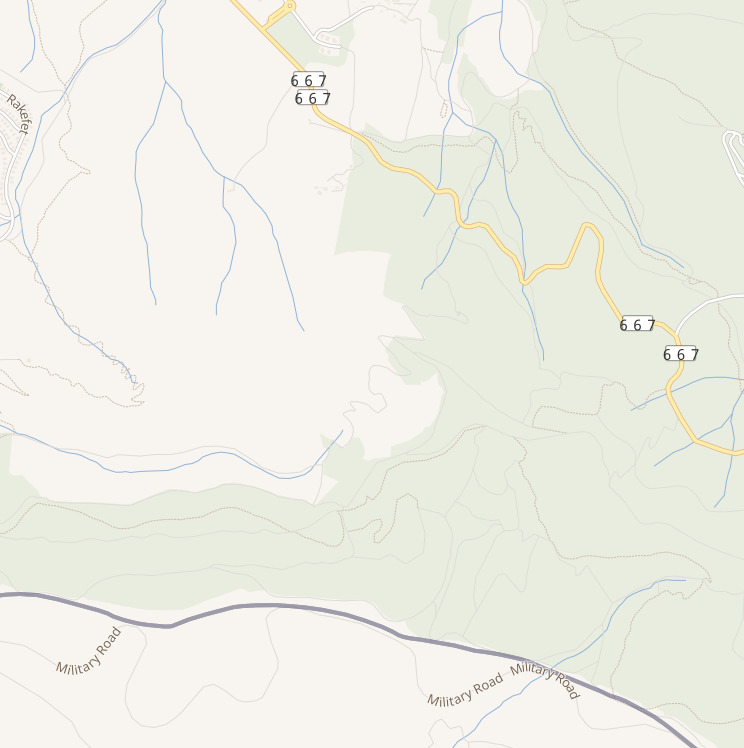
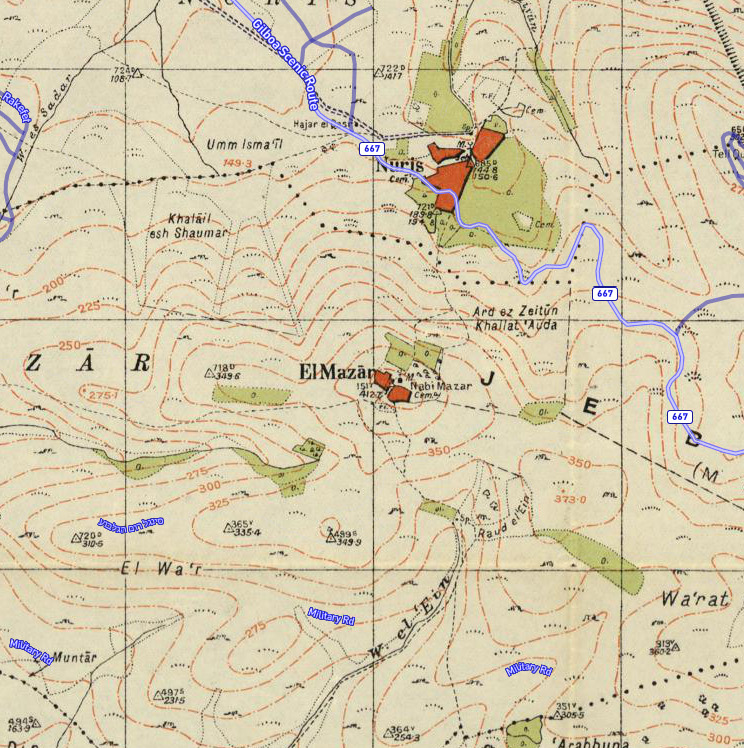
- 1870s map 1940s map modern map 1940s with modern overlay map A series of historical maps of the area around Al-Mazar, Jenin (click the buttons)

- Location within Mandatory Palestine
- Coordinates: 32°31′38″N 35°21′33″E
- Palestine grid: 184/214
- Geopolitical entity: Mandatory Palestine
- Subdistrict: Jenin
- Date of depopulation: 30 May 1948

Area
  - Total: 14,501 dunams (14.501 km^{2}; 5.599 sq mi)

Population (1945)
  - Total: 270
- Cause(s) of depopulation: Military assault by Yishuv forces
- Current Localities: Prazon, Meitav, and Gan Ner

Al-Mazar (Arabic: المزار) was a Palestinian Arab village in the District of Jenin. Situated on Mount Gilboa, its history stretched back to the period of Mamluk rule over Palestine (13th century). An agricultural village, its villagers traced their ancestry to nomads descended from a Sufi mystic from Jaba', Syria.

Al-Mazar was depopulated during the 1948 Palestine war, and incorporated into the newly established state of Israel. The Israeli villages of Prazon, Meitav, and Gan Ner were established on al-Mazar's former lands.

== Location ==
The village was located on the flat, circular peak of the mountain known in biblical scripture as Mount Gilboa, and locally as Mount al-Mazar or Djebel Foukou'ah ("Mount of Mushrooms"), with steep slopes on all sides excepting the southeast. It was joined to the neighbouring village of Nuris by a dirt path.

== History ==
The village may have been named al-Mazar (Arabic for "shrine", "a place one visits") because it was a burial place of many of those who fell in the Battle of Ain Jalut between the Mamluks and the Mongols in 1260.

The villagers traced their origins to the al-Sadiyyun nomads, who in turn were descended from Shaykh Sad al-Din al-Shaybani (died 1224), a prominent Sufi mystic from the Jaba' village on the Golan. Another tradition traces their ancestry to Libya.

=== Ottoman era ===
During the period of Ottoman rule over Palestine, al-Mazar was captured and burned by Napoleon's troops in April 1799 during the Syrian leg of his military campaign in Egypt. Pierre Jacotin named the village Nazer on his map from that campaign.

In 1870, V. Guérin visited al-Mazar, describing it as a village with about 500 inhabitants, situated at the peak of Djebel Foukou'ah, and surrounded by a belt of gigantic cactus plants. Numerous wells carved in the rock were said to point to the antiquity of the village. From the village, he could see the whole of Djebel Foukou'ah, which he identifies as the Mount Gilboa of biblical scripture, as well as the Jezreel Valley, the Little Hermon (actually Djebel Dhahy), Mount Tabor, and further north, the snowy peaks of Mount Hermon. Also seen from the village to the west and northwest were the Plain of Esdraelon and the Carmel Mountains; to the south, the mountains around Jenin; and to the east, before the Jordan River, what he calls the ancient country of Galaad. He notes that the name of Mount Gilboa is preserved in the name of the village of Djelboun, also situated on the mountain. Descending the mountain towards the west-southwest, at the base of the village of al-Mazar, he notes the presence of a spring of the same name, Ain el-Mezar, and on the slopes of this side of the mountain, which are less steep, there were olive trees and wheat being cultivated.

In the 1882 the PEF's Survey of Western Palestine (SWP) described the place as: "a village on the summit of the mountain. It is principally built of stone, and has a well to the south-east. A few olives surround the houses. The site is very rocky. It is inhabited by Derwishes, and is a place of Muslim pilgrimage."

=== British Mandate era ===
In the 1922 census of Palestine, conducted by the British Mandate authorities, al-Mazar had a population of 223, all Muslims, increasing slightly in the 1931 census to 257, still all Muslims, in a total of 62 inhabited houses. The village was home to Sheik Farhan al Sadi, a prominent leader in the 1936 Arab revolt in Palestine. In 1937, at the age of 75, he was executed by the British authorities for his participation in the revolt.

Agriculture was the backbone of the village economy, which was based on grain, fruit, legume, and olive cultivation. In the 1945 statistics the population of Al-Mazar was 270 Muslims, with a total of 14,501 dunams of land. Of this, 5,221 dunums were used for cereals, 229 dunums were irrigated or used for orchards, of which 68 dunums were for olives, while 9 dunams were built-up (urban) land.

Farhan al-Sa'di (1856–1937) was born in al-Mazar. He is thought to be the first to use a weapon during the 1936 revolt.

=== 1948 and aftermath ===
On 19 April 1948, Palmah HQ (headquarters) ordered the OC (operational command) of the First Battalion to, "destroy enemy bases in Mazar, Nuris and Zir'in [..] Comment: with the capture of Zir'in, most of the village houses must be destroyed while [some] should be left intact for accommodation and defence." According to Benny Morris, the Israeli historian, the policy of destroying the Palestinian villages was characteristic of Haganah attacks in April–May 1948, just before the outbreak of the 1948 Arab–Israeli war. However, the specific orders for al-Mazar were either not acted upon, or did not succeed at once, as the village was not occupied until 30 May 1948. By that time, it had been captured after an attack by Israeli soldiers from the Golani Brigade, along with the village of Nuris, which lay at the foot of the mountain.

Following the war, the area was incorporated into the State of Israel and three villages were subsequently established on the land of al-Mazar; Prazon in 1953, Meitav in 1954, and Gan Ner in 1987. The Palestinian historian Walid Khalidi described what remained of al-Mazar in 1992:

The site is overgrown with thorns and cactuses and strewn with stone rubble. None of the village houses or landmarks remains. Almond trees and cactuses grow on parts of the village lands. The hilly lands are used as grazing areas, and other parts are covered with forest.

== Folklore ==
According to local tradition, the ancestral mother of the local al-Sadiyyun clan, Halima al-Sa'adi, was a Bedouin woman who breastfed the Islamic Prophet Muhammad. It is said that the prophet's mother entrusted the infant to a Bedouin woman to breastfeed him. Members of the clan say Halima nursed Muhammad in the house of his uncle following his mother's death when Muhammad was six years old.

== Bibliography ==
- Barron, J.B., ed. (1923). Palestine: Report and General Abstracts of the Census of 1922. Government of Palestine.
- Cline, E.H. (2002). The Battles of Armageddon: Megiddo and the Jezreel Valley from the Bronze Age to the Nuclear Age. University of Michigan Press. ISBN 0-472-06739-7.
- Conder, C.R.; Kitchener, H.H. (1882). The Survey of Western Palestine: Memoirs of the Topography, Orography, Hydrography, and Archaeology. Vol. 2. London: Committee of the Palestine Exploration Fund.
- Government of Palestine, Department of Statistics (1945). Village Statistics, April, 1945.
- Guérin, V. (1874). Description Géographique Historique et Archéologique de la Palestine (in French). Vol. 2: Samarie, pt. 1. Paris: L'Imprimerie Nationale.
- Hadawi, S. (1970). Village Statistics of 1945: A Classification of Land and Area ownership in Palestine. Palestine Liberation Organization Research Center. Archived from the original on 2018-12-08.
- Karmon, Y. (1960). "An Analysis of Jacotin's Map of Palestine" (PDF). Israel Exploration Journal. 10 (3, 4): 155–173, 244–253. Archived from the original (PDF) on 2017-12-01.
- Khalidi, W. (1992). All That Remains: The Palestinian Villages Occupied and Depopulated by Israel in 1948. Washington D.C.: Institute for Palestine Studies. ISBN 0-88728-224-5.
- Mills, E., ed. (1932). Census of Palestine 1931. Population of Villages, Towns and Administrative Areas. Jerusalem: Government of Palestine.
- Morris, B. (2004). The Birth of the Palestinian Refugee Problem Revisited. Cambridge University Press. ISBN 978-0-521-00967-6.
- Palmer, E.H. (1881). The Survey of Western Palestine: Arabic and English Name Lists Collected During the Survey by Lieutenants Conder and Kitchener, R. E. Transliterated and Explained by E.H. Palmer. Committee of the Palestine Exploration Fund.
