= Zir'in =

Zir'in زرعين Zer'en
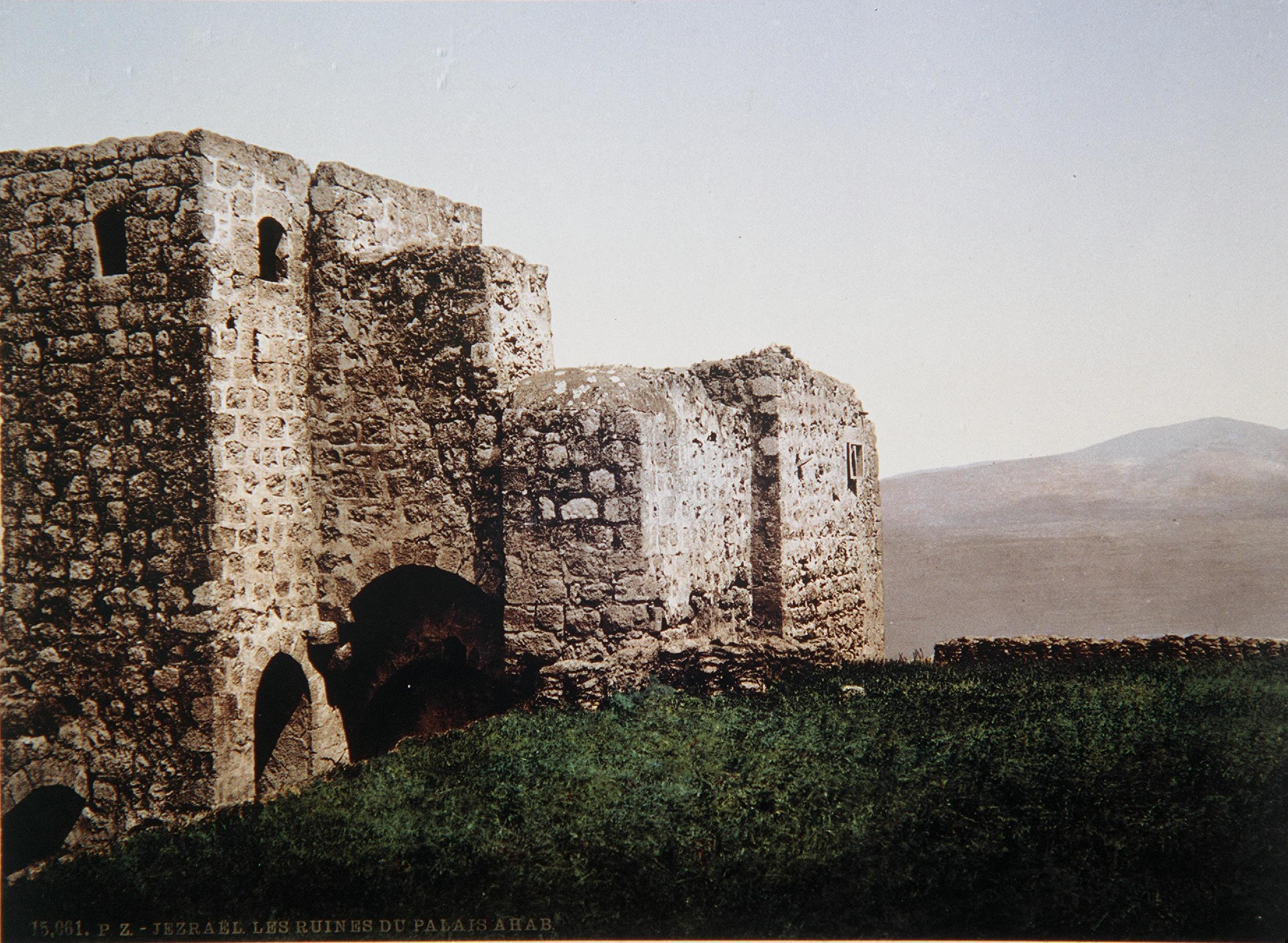
- The Tower House of Zir'in, by Felix Bonfils, before 1885.

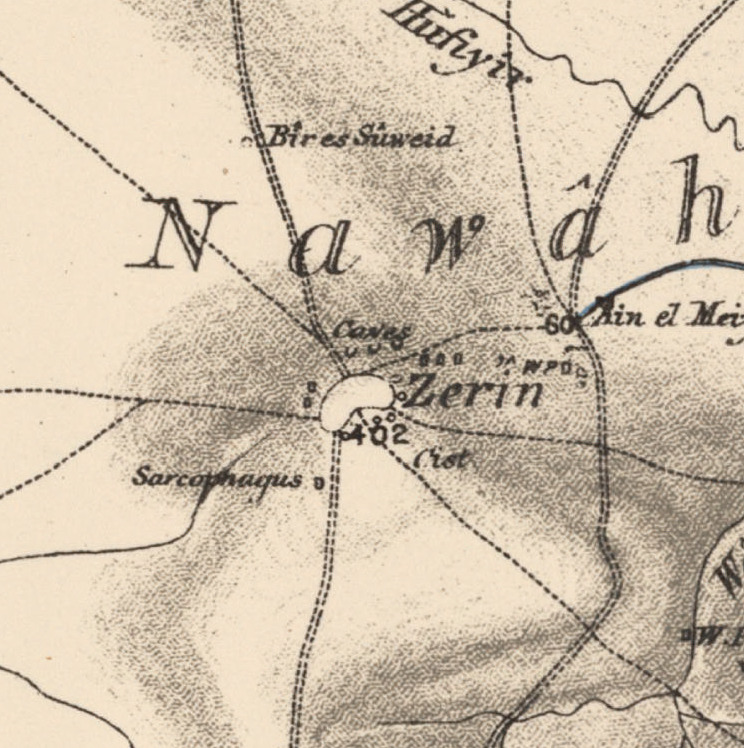
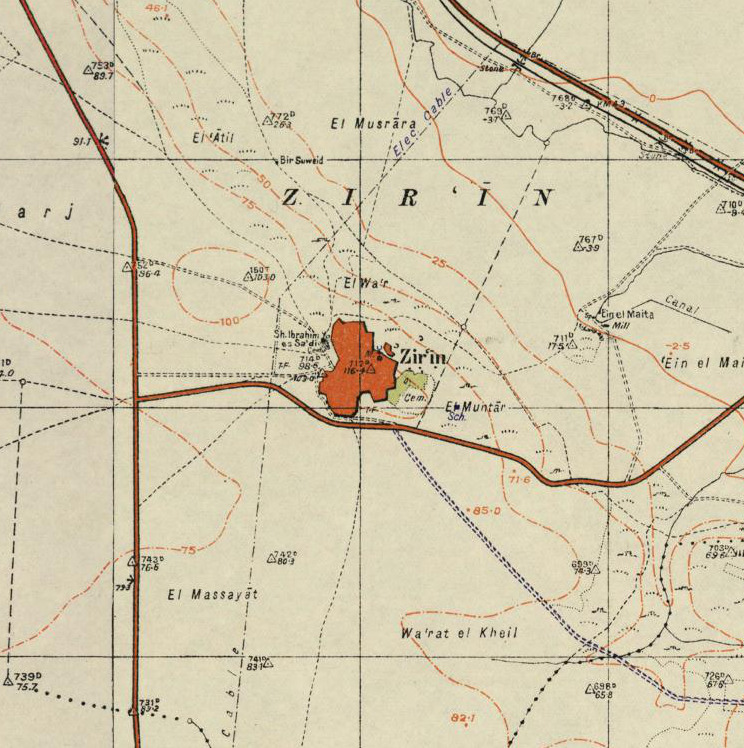
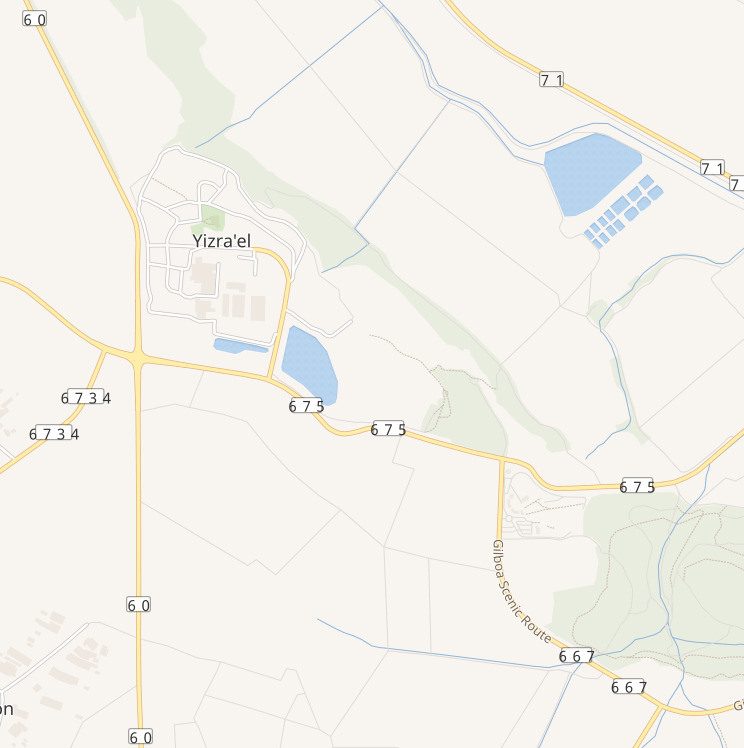
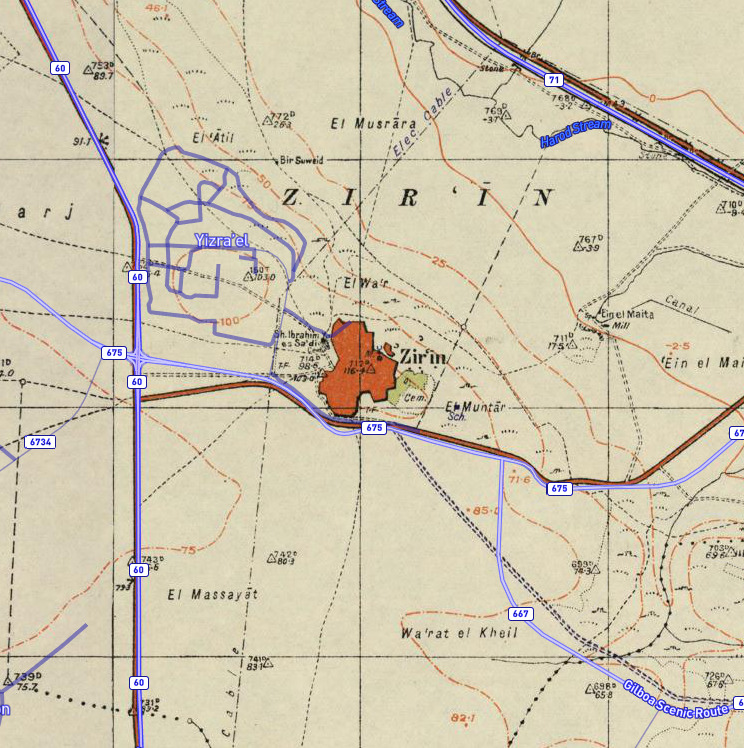
- 1870s map 1940s map modern map 1940s with modern overlay map A series of historical maps of the area around Zir'in (click the buttons)

- Location within Mandatory Palestine
- Coordinates: 32°33′27″N 35°19′40″E
- Palestine grid: 181/218
- Geopolitical entity: Mandatory Palestine
- Subdistrict: Jenin
- Date of depopulation: May 28, 1948

Area
  - Total: 23,920 dunams (23.92 km^{2}; 9.24 sq mi)

Population (1945)
  - Total: 1,420
- Cause(s) of depopulation: Military assault by Yishuv forces
- Current Localities: Yizre'el, Avital

Zir'in (Arabic: زرعين), also spelled Zerin and Zerein, was a Palestinian Arab village of over 1,400 in the Jezreel Valley, located 11 kilometers (6.8 mi) north of Jenin. Identified as the ancient town of Yizre'el (Jezreel), it was known as Zir'in during Islamic rule, and was near the site of the Battle of Ain Jalut, in which the Mamluks halted Mongol expansion southward. Under the Ottomans, it was a small village, expanding during the British Mandate in the early 20th century. After its capture by Israel in 1948, Zir'in was destroyed. The Israeli kibbutz of Yizre'el was established shortly after on the village lands of Zir'in.

== Etymology ==
Derived from a common Canaanite root meaning to "sow", Yizre'el translates in Hebrew as "God give seed" and its Arabic name "Zir'in" has a similar connotation.

The Crusaders referred to it as "le Petit Gerin" or "the Little Jenin" to distinguish it from Jenin, which they called "le Grand Gerin". In Latin literature of the time it was called "Gezrael", "Iezrael", "Parvum Gerinum" or "Zarain".

== History ==
=== Bronze and Iron Ages ===
Zir'in is identified with the Canaanite and Israelite town of Yizre'el (or Jezreel) mentioned in the Bible, when it was a major royal fortress of the Kingdom of Israel. The site has been extensively excavated by various archaeologists, including Norma Franklin.

=== Crusader period ===
A vaulted building and other structures remain from a castle that belonged to the Templars by the 1180s. During the Battle of al-Fule, Saladin has sent skirmishers to raid then Crusader-held Zir'in in October 1183. In September 1184, Saladin and his Ayyubid forces passed through the village on their way to Nablus.

=== Mamluk period ===
After the Mamluks took control of the area in the late 13th century, the Mamluk sultan Zahir Baybars defeated the Mongols in the Battle of Ain Jalut in 1260, at a site just west of Zir'in. After the battle, Baybars ordered the renovation of the village mosque. During the Mamluk period the village was one of the stops on the postal route between Jenin and Irbid.

=== Ottoman period ===
In 1517, Zir'in was incorporated into the Ottoman Empire along with the rest of Palestine. During the 16th and 17th centuries, it belonged to the Turabay Emirate (1517-1683), which encompassed also the Jezreel Valley, Haifa, Jenin, Beit She'an Valley, northern Jabal Nablus, Bilad al-Ruha/Ramot Menashe, and the northern part of the Sharon plain.

In 1596 Zir'in was a part of the nahiya ("subdistrict") of Jinin, a part of Sanjak Lajjun. A village of 4 Muslim households, it paid a fixed tax rate of 25% on wheat, barley, beehives, and goats; a total of 5,000 akçe. In the 17th and 18th centuries the village was most likely under the control of the Turabay, an Arab tribe that ruled part of northern Palestine on behalf of the Ottomans at the time. In 1799, Pierre Jacotin named the village Zezin on his map from the French campaign in Egypt and Syria.

In 1838, Edward Robinson said Zir'in contained about 20 houses.

In 1870/1871 (1288 AH), an Ottoman census listed the village in the nahiya (sub-district) of Shafa al-Qibly.

In 1882, the PEF's Survey of Western Palestine found Zir'in as consisting of about thirty houses, with the most prominent family living in a tall, tower-like house in the village center. A spring and well supplied Zir'in with water. The Ottomans founded a boys' school in the village.

=== British Mandate ===
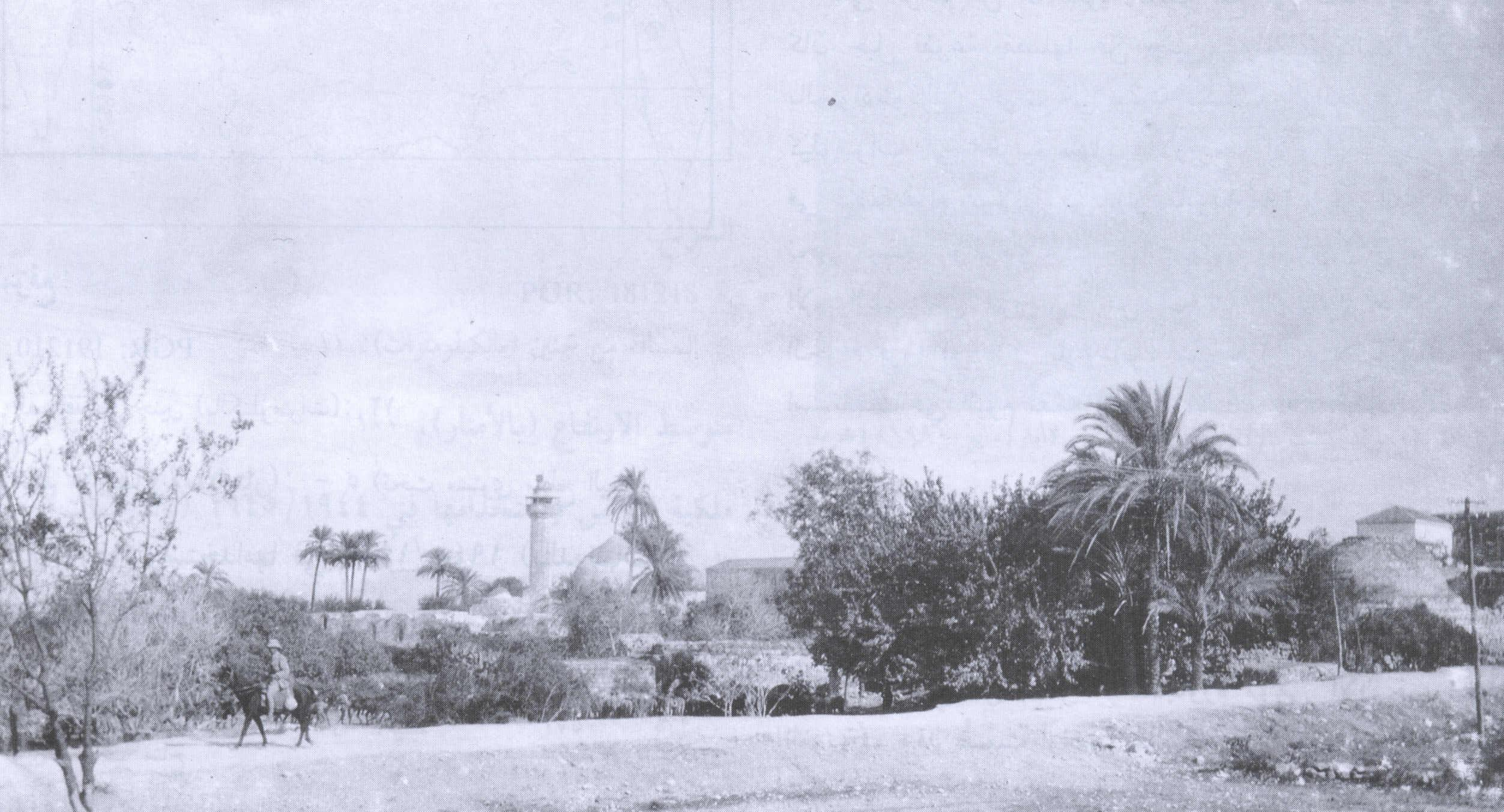
General view of Zir'in with its mosque in background, 1918

In the 1922 census of Palestine, conducted by the British Mandate authorities, Zir'in had a population of 727; 723 Muslims and 4 Christians, all 4 Christians were Orthodox. In the 1931 census this had increased to a population of 978 persons; 975 Muslims and 3 Christians, in 239 inhabited houses.

In the early 20th century, Zir'in was the birthplace of Mahmud Salim, a leader of the 1936-39 revolt in Palestine. The majority of the village's houses were constructed of mud and were clustered together, but house building and renovation also expanded. The commercial center of Zir'in consisted of the Mosque of Baybars, a marketplace, and the Ottoman school. Residents mainly cultivated grains, fruits, and vegetables.

In the 1945 statistics, the population was 1,420, all Muslims, with a total of 23,920 dunams of land. In 1944/45 a total of 22,595 dunums of village land was allocated to cereals, while 81 dunams were built-up (urban) areas.

=== 1948 war ===
Prior to the 1948 Arab-Israeli War, in March 1948, Zir'in's defenders, the Arab Liberation Army (ALA), reported that the Haganah had attempted several times to capture the village, but their assaults were suspended for ten days after heavy losses. On April 19, Zir'in was briefly captured, and most of the village houses were ordered destroyed, while the remainder were to be used to accommodate Jewish troops.

Controlled by the ALA, Zir'in was located in a strategic commanding position overlooking the towns of Afula and Baysan. The fear of Iraqi forces from Gesher in the east and Jenin in the south to form a "spearhead" and capture the Baysan and Jezreel valleys convinced the Jews to take Zir'in. After a mortar barrage to soften its defense, the village was captured on May 28 by the Thirteenth Battalion of the Golani Brigade with "little resistance". Women and children fled weeks prior to its capture, and after word had spread of its capture, the residents of nearby Nuris and al-Mazar also abandoned their villages. The ALA unsuccessfully attempted to recapture Zir'in two days later.

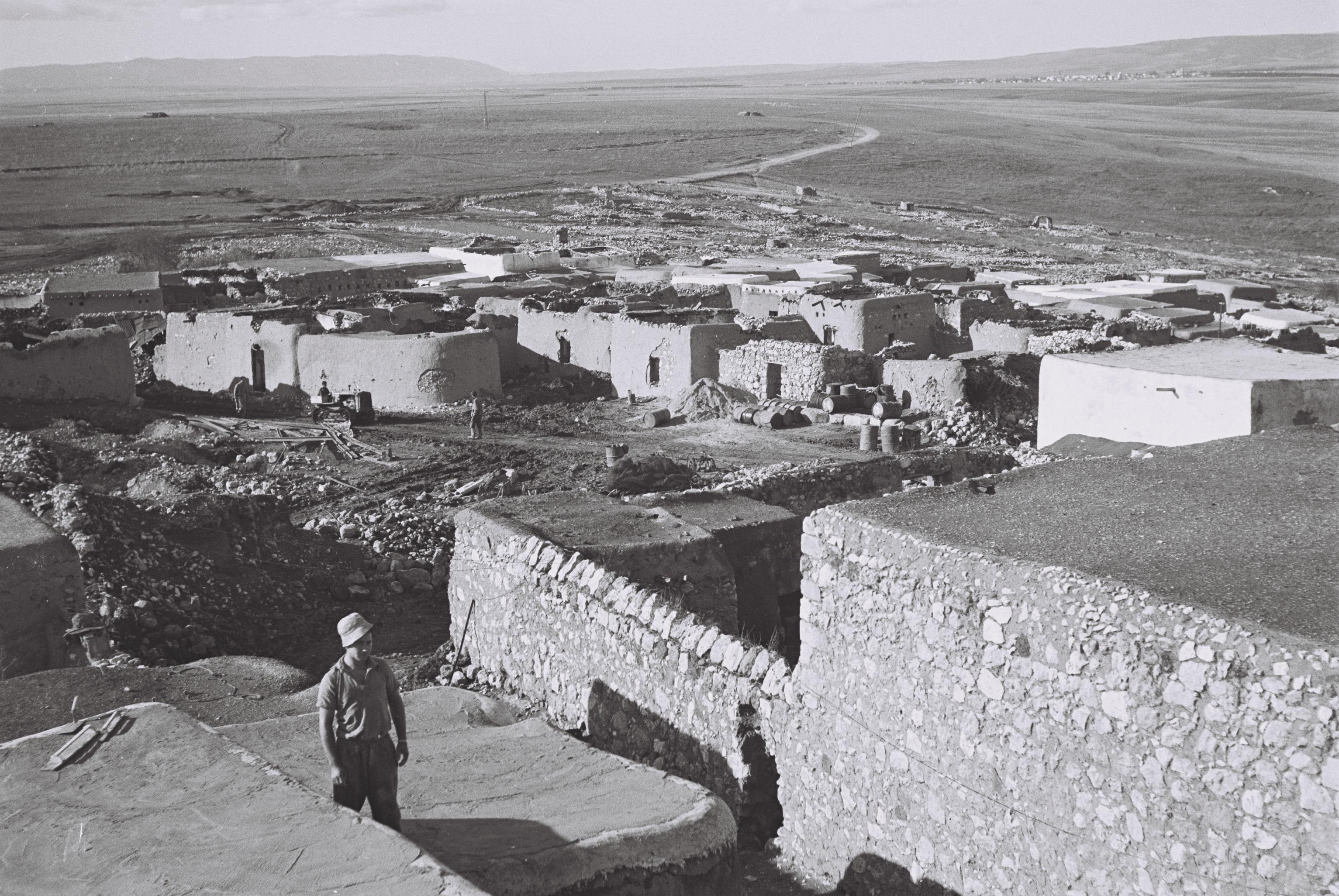
Zir'in, after occupation, on 30 January 1949

On July 10, the Iraqi Army based in Jenin, intended to recapture the village, but were unable to break through Israeli lines, followed by another unsuccessful attempt on July 19, after the second truce of the war. The final armistice line was drawn just to the south of Zir'in.

=== Israel ===
Following the war, the area was incorporated into the State of Israel. The kibbutz of Yizre'el was established on the northwestern side of Zir'in in August 1948.

== The tower house ==
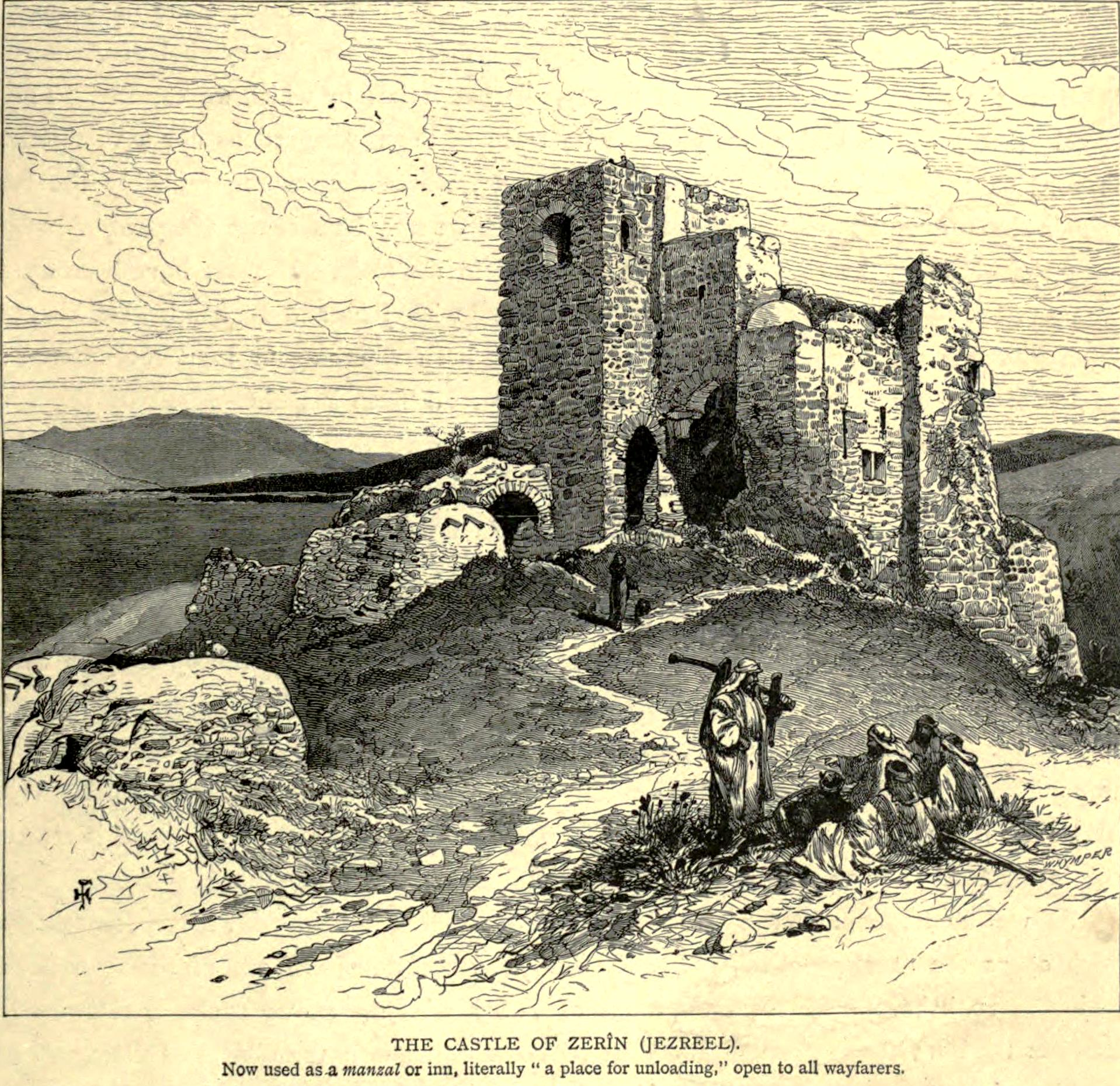
The Tower House, early 1880s

In the 19th century this was described as the Castle of Zir'in, which was used as an inn (manzil) for travellers. A representative for the Palestine Antiquities Museum (PAM), Mr Husseini, visited Zir'in in 1941, and noted: "S-E. of Church in a lane a part of a wall about 8m. long with two rough courses of masonry...S. within house of Abdul Karim Abdul Hadi in an open yard more building foundations are visible to N. two medieval vaults known as el-Uqud." Denys Pringle believes the vaults are part of the destroyed Crusader castle, but according to Petersen, they could equally well be from Mamluk times. Petersen, who inspected the place in 1994, notes that the appearance of the building indicate that it was constructed over a long period of time.

== Geography ==
Situated on a plateau off the Mount Gilboa, Zir'in was not much higher than the surrounding Jezreel Valley at its southern and western sides, with an average elevation of 100 meters (330 ft) above sea level. To the north and east was Wadi al-Jalut. Located 11 kilometers (6.8 mi) north of Jenin, it was the northernmost locality in the Jenin District, and alongside a lateral road linking two highways; one towards Jenin, the other towards Baysan.

Nearby localities included Nuris to the southeast, Sandala to the south, Zububa to the southwest, Sulam to the north, and Qumya to the northeast. In 1945, it consisted of 23,920 dunams. The majority of the village lands (20,964 dunams) were allocated for cereals, while the built-up area of Zir'in consisted of 81 dunams.

== Demographics ==
Zir'in had a population of 22 in 1596 according to Ottoman records. In 1922, a British Mandate survey recorded a population of 722, rising to 978 in the 1931 census. According to Sami Hadawi's population survey, Zir'in had a population of 1,420, an increase of roughly 1.5% since 1931. All of the inhabitants were Muslims. Refugees from Zir'in and their descendants numbered 10,116 in 1998.

== Bibliography ==
- Barron, J.B., ed. (1923). Palestine: Report and General Abstracts of the Census of 1922. Government of Palestine.
- Conder, C.R.; Kitchener, H.H. (1882). The Survey of Western Palestine: Memoirs of the Topography, Orography, Hydrography, and Archaeology. Vol. 2. London: Committee of the Palestine Exploration Fund.
- Government of Palestine, Department of Statistics (1945). Village Statistics, April, 1945.
- Guérin, V. (1874). Description Géographique Historique et Archéologique de la Palestine (in French). Vol. 2: Samarie, pt. 1. Paris: L'Imprimerie Nationale. (pp.311 - 323)
- Hadawi, S. (1970). Village Statistics of 1945: A Classification of Land and Area ownership in Palestine. Palestine Liberation Organization Research Center.
- Hütteroth, W.-D.; Abdulfattah, K. (1977). Historical Geography of Palestine, Transjordan and Southern Syria in the Late 16th Century. Erlanger Geographische Arbeiten, Sonderband 5. Erlangen, Germany: Vorstand der Fränkischen Geographischen Gesellschaft. ISBN 3-920405-41-2.
- Karmon, Y. (1960). "An Analysis of Jacotin's Map of Palestine" (PDF). Israel Exploration Journal. 10 (3, 4): 155–173, 244–253. Archived from the original (PDF) on 2019-12-22.
- Khalidi, W. (1992). All That Remains: The Palestinian Villages Occupied and Depopulated by Israel in 1948. Washington D.C.: Institute for Palestine Studies. ISBN 0-88728-224-5.
- Lyons, Malcolm Cameron; Jackson, D.E.P. (1984). Saladin: the Politics of the Holy War. Cambridge University Press. ISBN 978-0-521-31739-9.
- Mills, E., ed. (1932). Census of Palestine 1931. Population of Villages, Towns and Administrative Areas. Jerusalem: Government of Palestine.
- Morris, B. (2004). The Birth of the Palestinian Refugee Problem Revisited. Cambridge University Press. ISBN 978-0-521-00967-6.
- Palmer, E.H. (1881). The Survey of Western Palestine: Arabic and English Name Lists Collected During the Survey by Lieutenants Conder and Kitchener, R. E. Transliterated and Explained by E.H. Palmer. Committee of the Palestine Exploration Fund. (p.172)
- Petersen, Andrew (2001). A Gazetteer of Buildings in Muslim Palestine (British Academy Monographs in Archaeology). Vol. I. Oxford University Press. ISBN 978-0-19-727011-0.
- Pringle, D. (1993). The Churches of the Crusader Kingdom of Jerusalem: A-K (excluding Acre and Jerusalem). Vol. I. Cambridge University Press. ISBN 0-521-39036-2. (pp. 276-278)
- Pringle, D. (1997). Secular buildings in the Crusader Kingdom of Jerusalem: an archaeological Gazetter. Cambridge University Press. ISBN 0521-46010-7.
- Pringle, D. (2009). The Churches of the Crusader Kingdom of Jerusalem: The cities of Acre and Tyre with Addenda and Corrigenda to Volumes I-III. Vol. IV. Cambridge University Press. ISBN 978-0-521-85148-0. ( pp. 269-272)
- Robinson, E.; Smith, E. (1841). Biblical Researches in Palestine, Mount Sinai and Arabia Petraea: A Journal of Travels in the year 1838. Vol. 3. Boston: Crocker & Brewster.
- Tal, D. (2004). War in Palestine, 1948: Strategy and Diplomacy. Routledge. ISBN 0-7146-5275-X.
- Wilson, C.W., ed. (c. 1881). Picturesque Palestine, Sinai and Egypt. Vol. 2. New York: D. Appleton.
