= Prazon =

Prazon: פְּרָזוֹן (Hebrew)
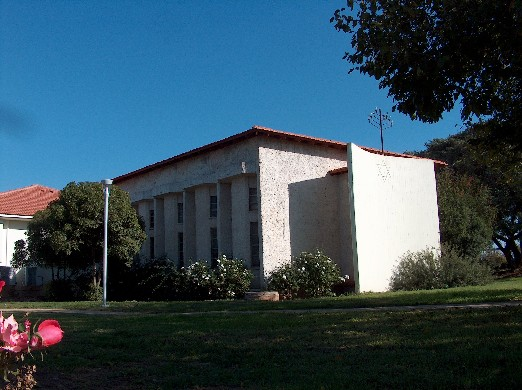
- The synagogue at the center of the settlement, 2006

- Location within Israel Location within Jezreel Valley region of Israel
- Coordinates: 32°32′41″N 35°18′42″E
- Country: Israel
- District: Northern
- Subdistrict: Jezreel
- Council: Gilboa
- Affiliation: Moshavim Movement
- Founded: 1953
- Founder: Kurdish Jews
- Area: 2,200 dunams (2.2 km^{2}; 0.85 sq mi)
- Population (2024): 420
  - Density: 190/km^{2} (490/sq mi)

Prazon (Hebrew: פְּרָזוֹן) is a moshav in northern Israel founded by Kurdish Jews in the early 1950s. Located in the Ta'anakh region, it falls under the jurisdiction of Gilboa Regional Council. The moshav has historically been an agricultural community, with farming as the backbone of its economy. In 2024 it had a population of 420.

== Etymology ==
The name "Prazon" (פרזון), meaning "rural population" or "unwalled villagers," is derived from a verse in the Book of Judges: "The villagers ceased in Israel, they ceased until I Deborah arose (Judges 5:7)."

The Hebrew word prazon appears in this verse and has been interpreted by classical commentators such as Rashi to mean inhabitants of unwalled, vulnerable settlements, reflecting the hope of the moshav's founders to establish a peaceful rural community in the same region where the biblical story occurred. Before receiving the name Prazon, the moshav was initially called Ta'anakh Bet.

== History ==
Prazon was founded in 1953 by Jewish immigrants to Israel from Kurdistan who had arrived in Israel in the early 1950s. Prazon was the second settlement in the Ta'anakh, following the founding of nearby Avital earlier that year. Many spent their first years in Israel at the Megiddo ma'abara (transit camp) before moving to the new moshav in 1953. In total about 60 families formed the core of Prazon's original community.

The moshav was established on the lands of the former Palestinian village of Al-Mazar, which was depopulated during the 1948 Arab-Israeli War. In the years between 1948 and the start of the Ta'anakh settlement project in 1953 the area stood desolate and abandoned.

In its early years, Prazon faced typical challenges of new immigrant moshavim. The residents initially lived in rudimentary huts and tents with limited infrastructure. Water had to be fetched from a nearby kibbutz until shared taps were installed, and electricity was absent in the beginning. The settling institutions specifically recruited Jewish immigrants from rural backgrounds in the mountains of Kurdistan, believing their origins would help them adapt to the severe physical demands of reclaiming the land and establishing a new agricultural frontier.

Prazon, together with Avital and Meitav (est. 1954), formed the Yael bloc of moshavim in Ta'anakh – all founded by Kurdish Jewish immigrants. In later years, additional moshavim in the region were founded by Moroccan Jews, Tunisian Jews, Persian Jews, and others, with Prazon remaining predominantly Kurdish in character.

== Geography and demographics ==
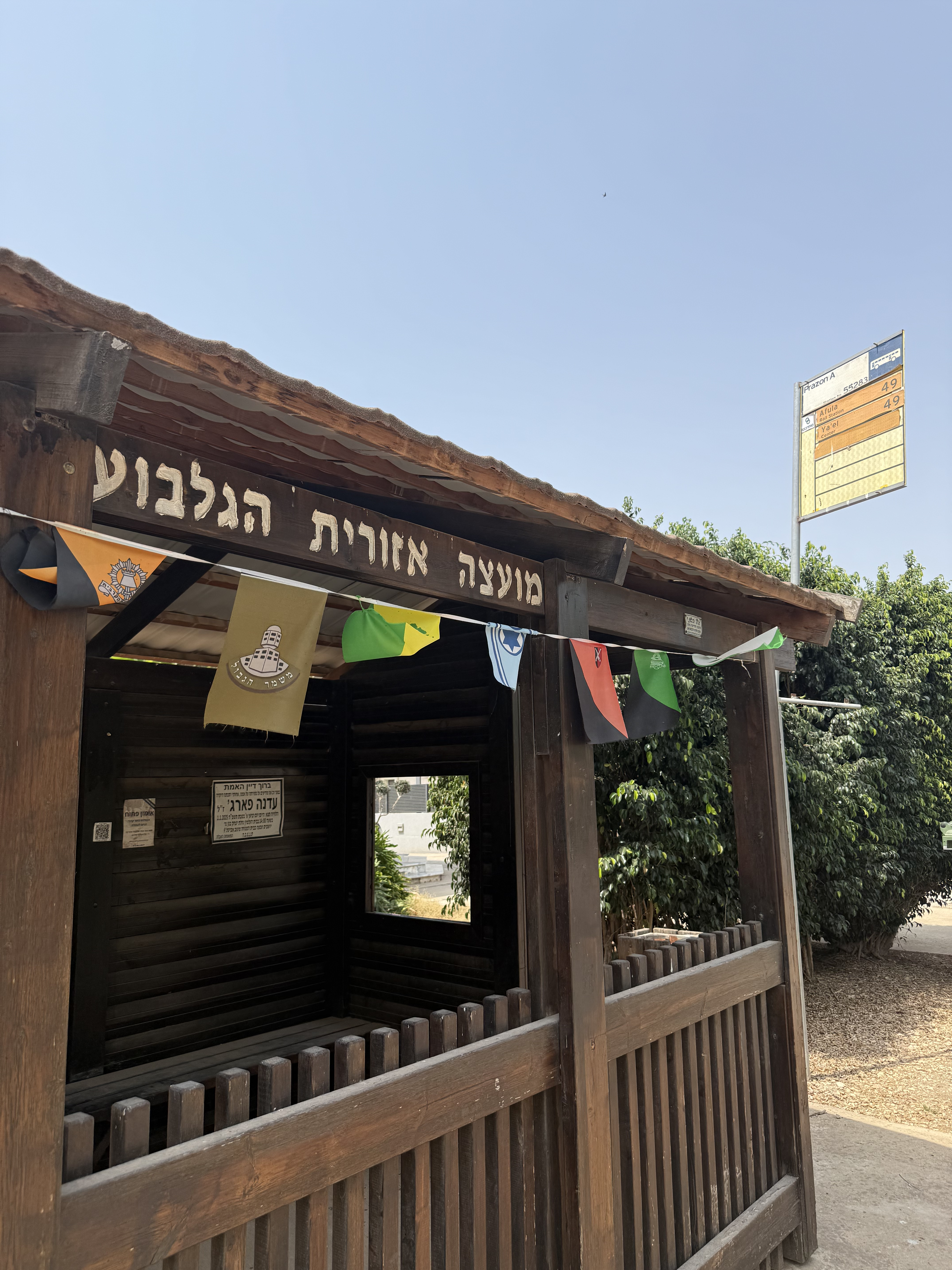
A public transit bus stop serving Moshav Prazon.

Prazon is located in the Northern District of Israel, in the Gilboa Regional Council jurisdiction. It lies in the Ta'anakh region, a cluster of agricultural villages south of Afula in the Yizre'el Valley area. West of the village runs the seasonal stream Nahal Gilboa, and the surrounding landscape is characterized by fertile farmland of the Yizre'el Valley. Prazon is about 7 km south of Afula and roughly 30 km southwest of the Sea of Galilee. The population of Prazon is Jewish, like all the villages in this regional bloc (nearby exceptions being the Arab villages of Sandala and Muqeible about 3 km to the south).

Prazon's population is mostly Jewish, and has fluctuated over the decades, in 1972 it had around 500 inhabitants, while by the end of 2023 the Israel Central Bureau of Statistics estimated that the population of Israeli residents was approximately 398.

In August 2025, the Gilboa Regional Council unveiled a plan to increase the regional population, which included an allocation of 63 new housing units to be built in Prazon over the coming decade.

== Economy and agriculture ==
Agriculture has been the backbone of Prazon's economy since its establishment. Upon arrival, the Kurdish immigrant families were each allocated a small farm plot (nahala) and received basic tools and work animals from the Jewish Agency. In the early years, they focused on crop farming: the moshav's farmers grew vegetables and field crops such as watermelons, onions, garlic, and sugar beets, learning new farming methods with guidance from government instructors. Two families shared a single horse and wooden plow for tilling the land, and they would transport their produce by horse-drawn wagon to sell in the market of Afula, which was then a small town. he Israeli Ministry of Agriculture under Moshe Dayan initially encouraged only crop cultivation in the area and was hesitant about dairy farming;, the villagers insisted on keeping dairy cows to supplement their livelihood.

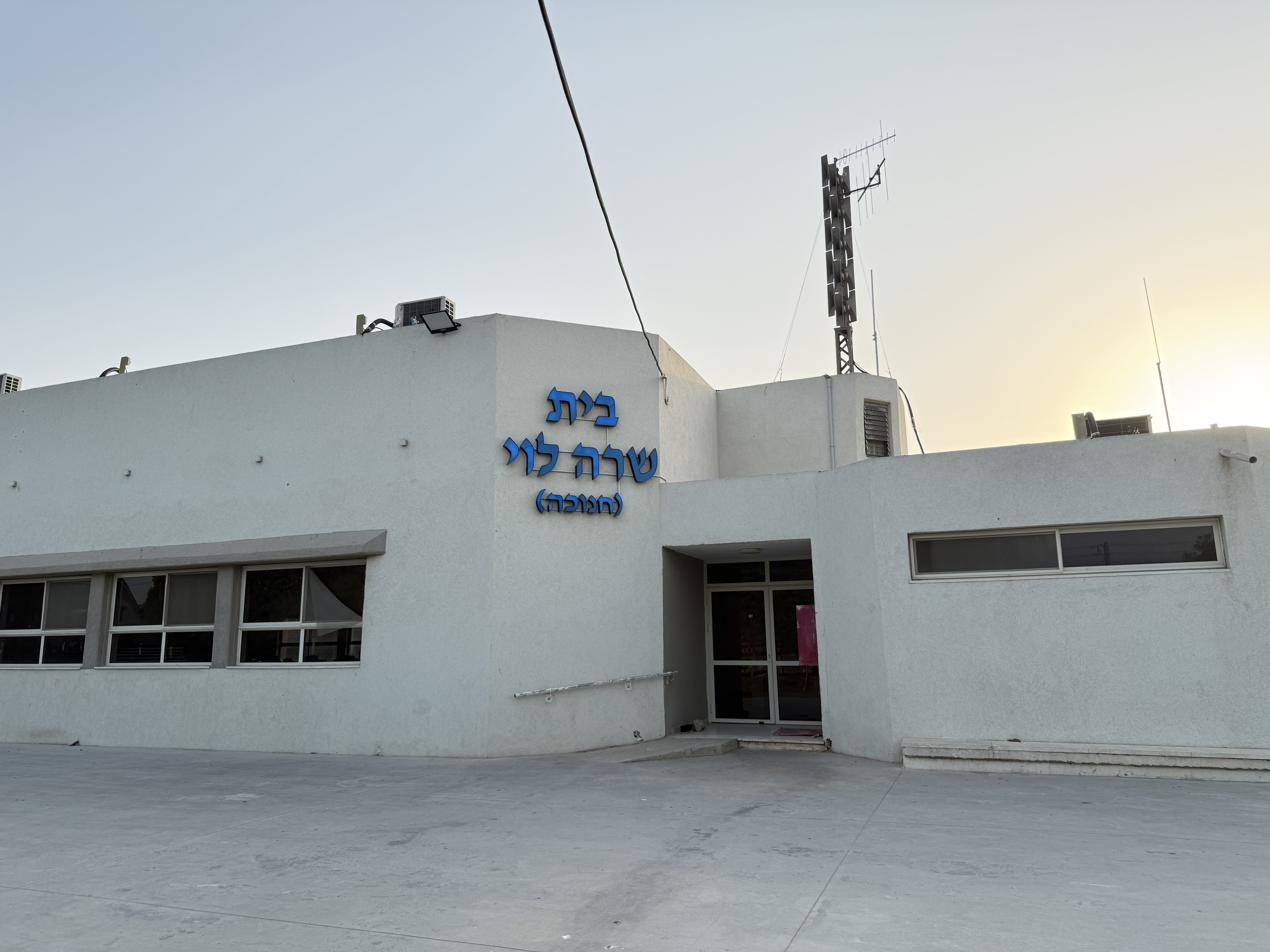
The moshav secretariat building.

Small-scale dairy farming soon became a significant part of Prazon's economy. Each family acquired a cow or two, and milk was milked daily by the women and children in the family. Over time the dairy operations modernized – once the village got electricity, farmers acquired mechanized milking machines and expanded their herds. By the 1970s–80s, Prazon had dozens of family-run cow sheds producing milk for the national market. In 2005 there were still 27 active dairy farms in Prazon, a number which since declined due to nationwide dairy sector reforms. As of the mid-2010s, fewer than 10 farms continued to raise dairy cattle in the moshav, with the remaining families each managing larger herds to stay economically viable.

In addition to dairy and field crops, Prazon's residents historically engaged in poultry and other farm branches. In the 1960s, many families maintained chicken coops (for eggs and meat) as part of a diversification effort; eggs were collected and sold through the cooperative store serving the Ta'anakh villages.

Cooperative frameworks have supported Prazon's economy since its founding. The village is a moshav ovdim meaning each family maintains its own farm but members cooperate in purchasing supplies and marketing produce. For decades Prazon had a cooperative purchasing organization and shared farm machinery services via the regional council. A central packing house and milk cooling station was operated jointly with neighboring moshavim in the Yael bloc in the early years.

== Culture ==
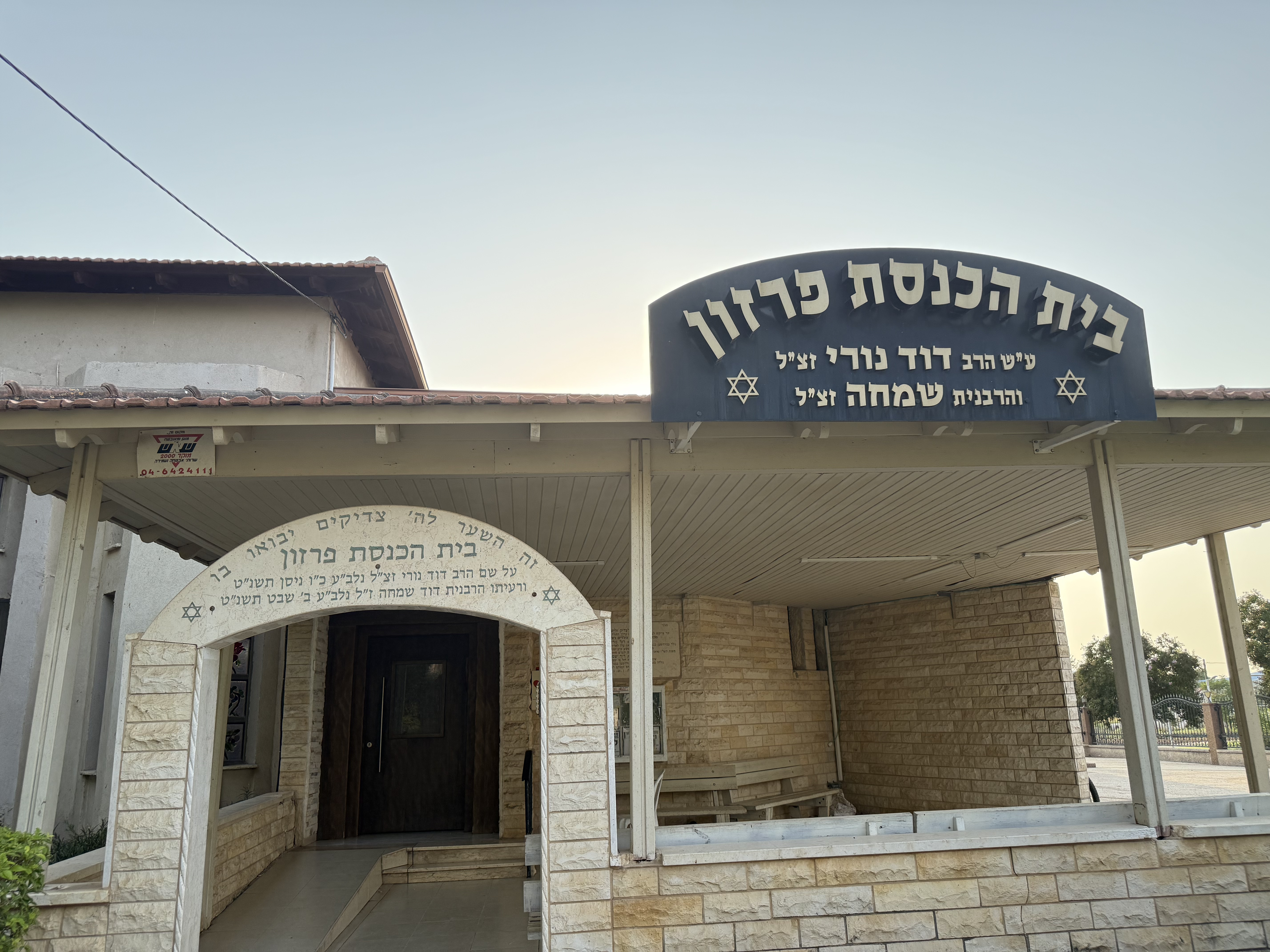
Entrance to the synagogue at the center of Prazon.

Religion plays a significant role in community life. Prazon is a Jewish village with a traditional religious character, though it is not officially ultra-orthodox or affiliated with a religious movement. A central synagogue stands at the heart of the village, serving as a focal point for prayer and gatherings. The synagogue (often simply called Beit Knesset) was established in the moshav's early years and has daily prayer services in the mornings and evenings for those who attend, as well as larger turnouts on Sabbaths and holidays.

The founding families, coming from Kurdistan, brought with them distinctive religious customs, including religious Jewish music and holiday foods, which have been maintained to some extent by their descendants. Prazon's synagogue follows the Sephardi/Mizrahi rite (common among Kurdish Jews) and holds special celebrations on holidays such as Mimouna (a North African Jewish festivity adopted regionally) and communal Passover seders. Next to the synagogue is a small community center hall where public meetings, lectures, and celebrations like bar/bat mitzvahs and weddings take place. In earlier times, this hall also hosted movie nights and Jewish dances for young people.

One important tradition for Kurdish Jews, the Seharane (a joyous nature festival originally celebrated in Kurdistan after Passover), has occasionally been revived in the region, with Prazon families joining larger regional Seharane events in the Galilee

== Infrastructure ==
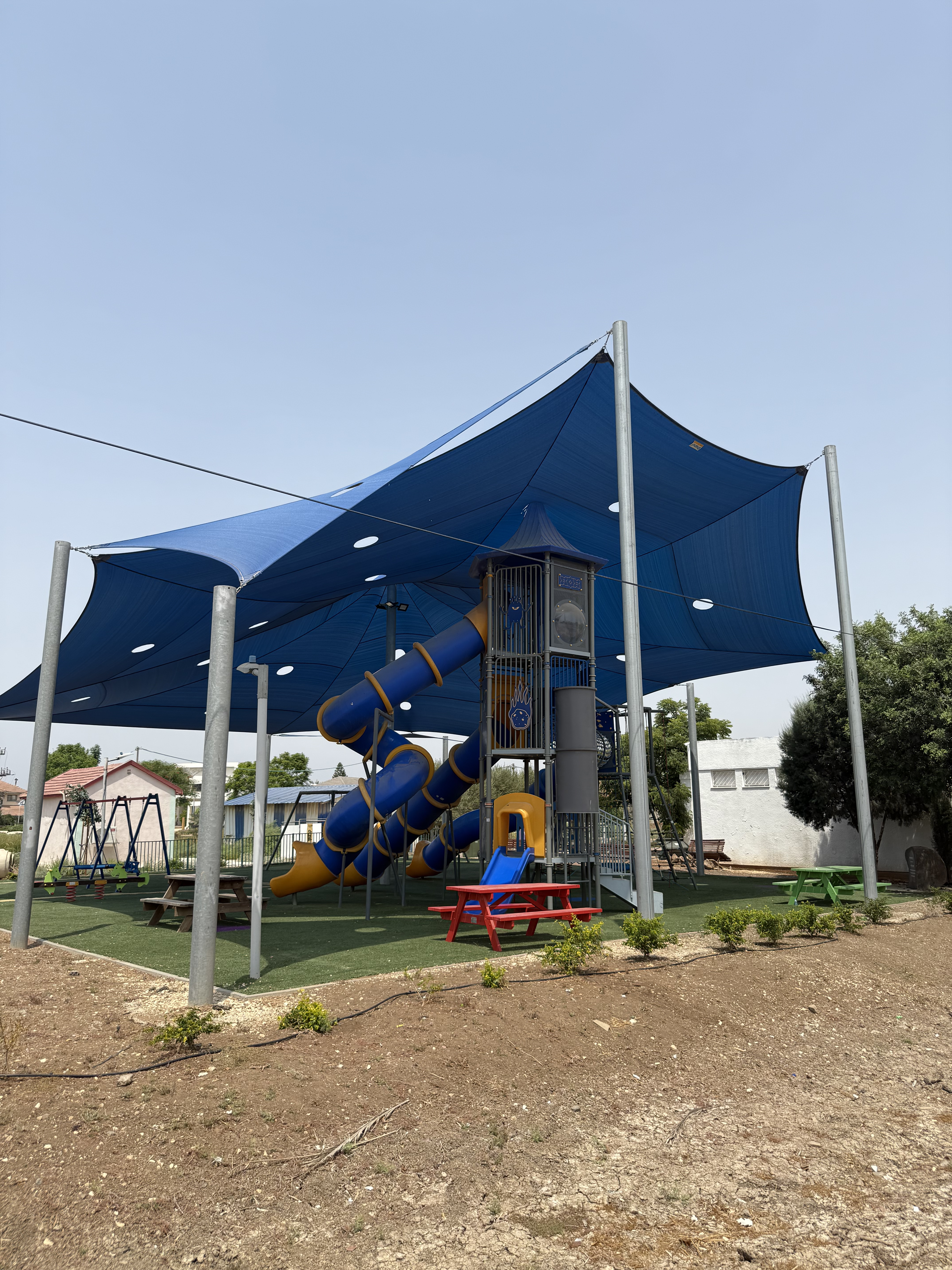
A playground at the center of Moshav Prazon.

Prazon features the regional "cluster" planning model designed by the Jewish Agency to efficiently absorb new immigrants and pool agricultural resources. Prazon, along with Avital and Meitav form the "Yael bloc." These three settlements share a rural center, Merkaz Yael.

Like many mid-century Israeli agricultural settlements, Prazon's layout reflects mid-century Zionist planning ideals where public facilities such as the central synagogue and communal administrative buildings are situated at the center of the village. A network of paved lanes connects this central hub to individual family farmsteads.

In accordance with the Ta'anakh planning model, each founding family was allocated a primary residential and agricultural parcel (known as "Plot A"), typically spanning 5 to 7 dunams. These plots were designed to contain both the family residence and adjacent agricultural structures, allowing each household to maintain a private farmstead while relying on the centralized infrastructure of Merkaz Yael.

== Notable people ==
The professional footballer Yonatan Levi grew up in the moshav and began his youth career with the local team, Hapoel Asi Gilboa.
