= Nurit =

Nurit: נורית (Hebrew)
- Location within Jezreel Valley region of Israel
- Coordinates: 32°32′27″N 35°21′35″E
- Country: Israel
- District: Northern
- Subdistrict: Jezreel
- Council: Gilboa
- Founded: 1950
- Population (2024): 281

Nurit (Hebrew: נורית) is a community settlement in northern Israel. Located on Mount Gilboa, it falls under the jurisdiction of Gilboa Regional Council.

== History ==
The village was established as a moshav in 1950 by immigrants to Israel from Yemen and was named after the nearby Arab village Nuris, which lay in the adjacent valley. The Arab village was captured on 29 May 1948, during the 1948 Arab–Israeli War. However, the residents abandoned the moshav after nine years, except for one woman who continued to live there until the early 1990s. In June 1958 a gar'in that went on to establish Ram-On was based in the village.

In 1962 the site became a Gadna army base, which was subsequently closed in 1994. In 2010 the Gilboa Regional Council started making plans to re-establish the settlement as an ecovillage, with a village committee formed in 2015.
