= Yizre'el =

Yizre'el: יִזְרְעֶאל (Hebrew)
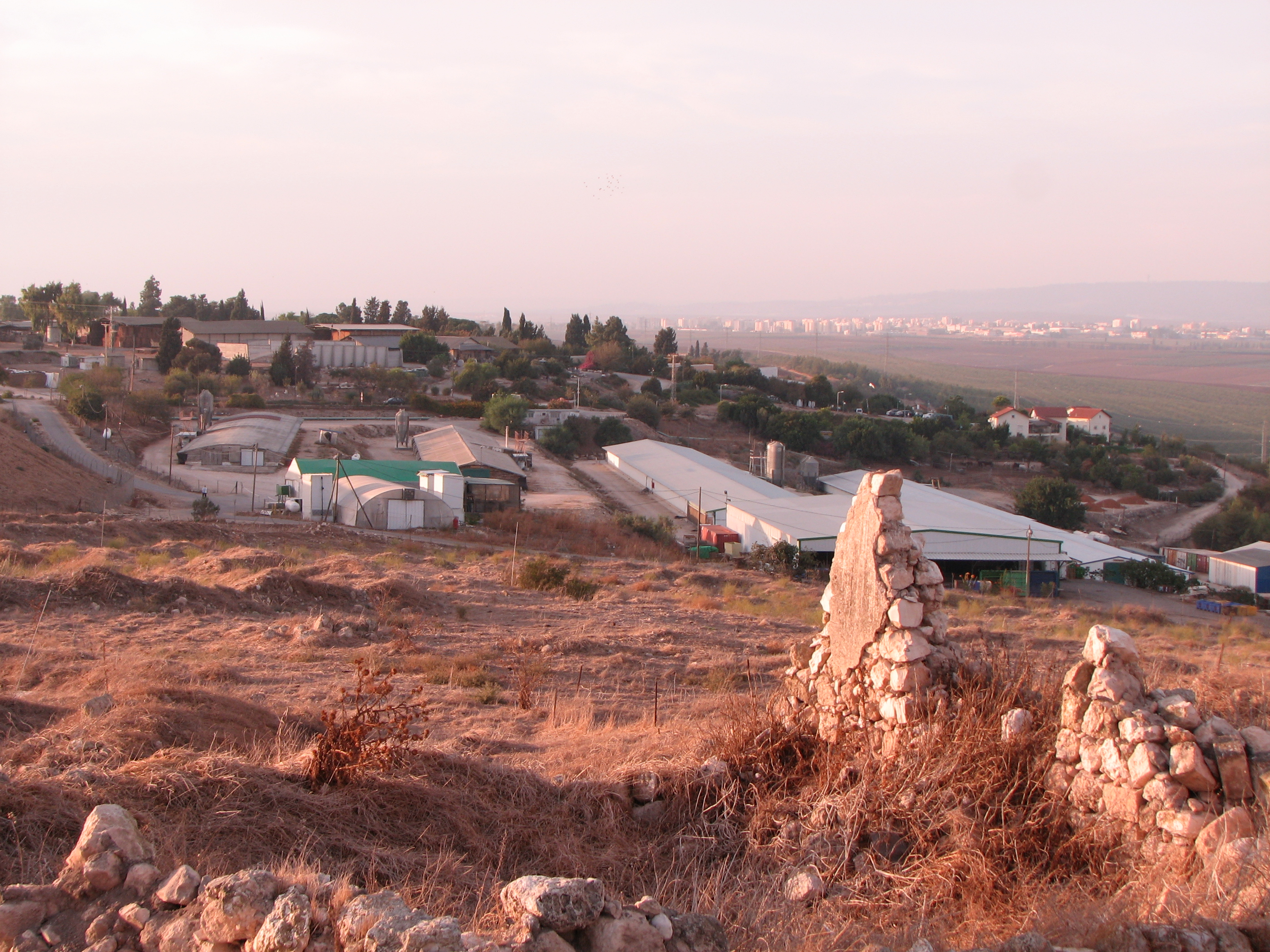

- Location within Jezreel Valley region of Israel
- Coordinates: 32°33′42″N 35°19′20″E
- Country: Israel
- District: Northern
- Subdistrict: Jezreel
- Council: Gilboa
- Affiliation: Kibbutz Movement
- Founded: 20 August 1948
- Founder: Demobilised Palmach soldiers
- Population (2024): 627
- Website: Kibbutz Yizre'el website

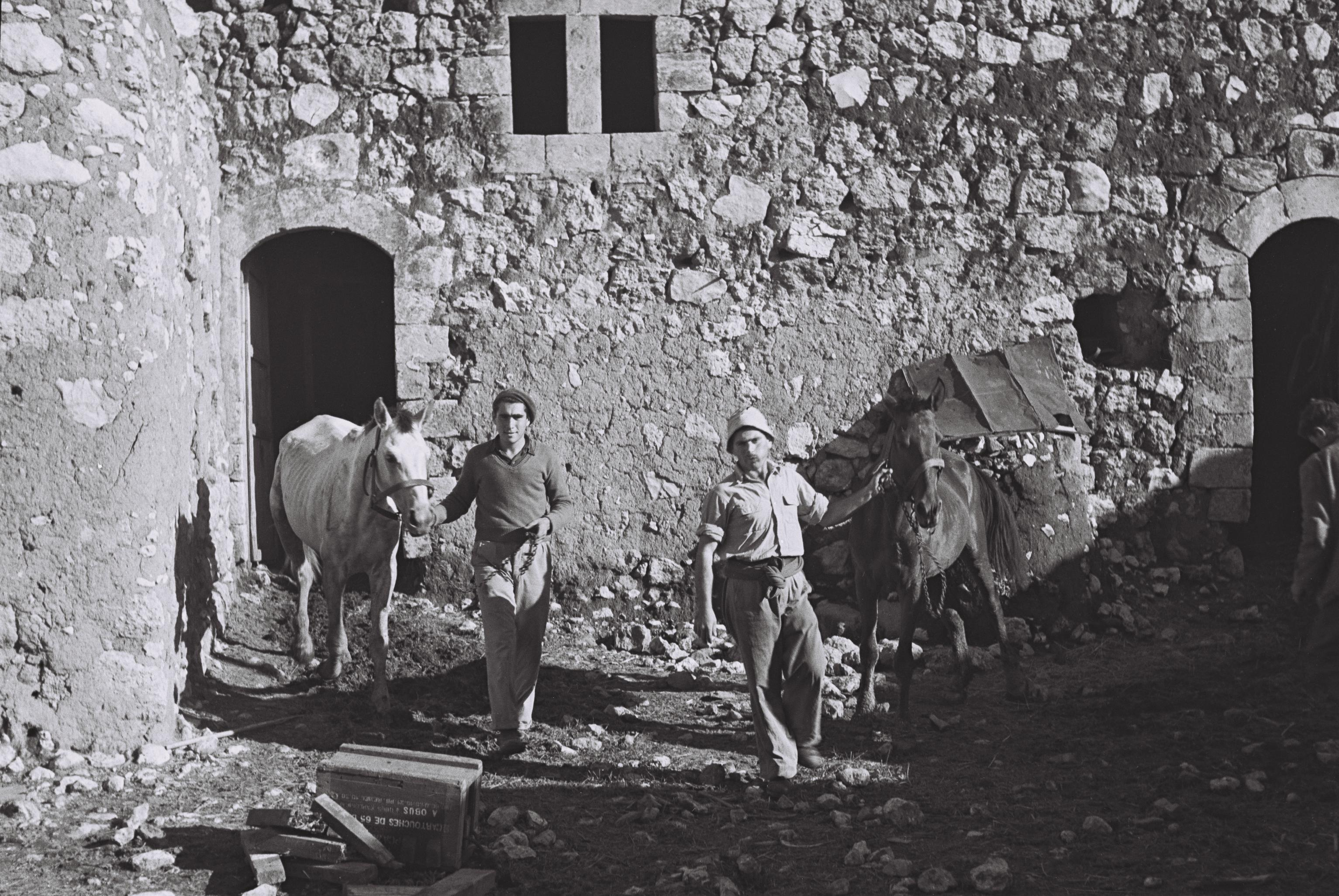
Kibbutz stable in 1949, former house in Zir'in

Yizre'el (Hebrew: יִזְרְעֶאל) is a kibbutz in north-eastern Israel. Located in the Jezreel Valley near Afula, it falls under the jurisdiction of Gilboa Regional Council. In 2024 it had a population of 627.

== History ==
After the Mamluks took control of the area in the late 13th century, the Mamluk sultan Zahir Baybars defeated the Mongols in the Battle of Ain Jalut at a site just west of what was then Zir'in, where Yizre'el now stands.

The kibbutz was established in August 1948 by demobilised Palmach soldiers on the lands of the depopulated Palestinian village of Zir'in. In 1950, it moved North-West of the Zir'in village site. It was one of the first kibbutzim to abandon the system of children sleeping in communal houses, instead allowing them to live with their parents.

It was named after the ancient city of Jezreel, which was located in the area allotted to the tribe of Issachar (Joshua 19:18).

== Economy ==
A major branch of the kibbutz economy is Maytronics, which manufactures a robot swimming pool cleaner exported to over 34 countries. Maytronics also has a division for pool safety, including pool alarms and automatic pool covers.

Yizre'el has been a major centre for rugby union in Israel since the 1970s, when a group of local South Africans helped give the national game a major push.

== Sports ==
- Yizre'el RC

== Notable people ==
- Amit Peled (born 1973), Cellist, conductor, pedagogue
- Inbal Pezaro (born 1987), Paralympic swimmer
- Avraham (Pachi) Shapira
