= Thomas Hoegh =

Norwegian investor and entrepreneur (born 1966)

Thomas Hoegh is a Norwegian artist, investor and entrepreneur who oversees a portfolio of high-growth businesses in the creative sectors. Thomas directs films and theatre under the name Torstein Blixfjord. He was born in Oslo in 1966.

== Career ==
Hoegh graduated from Northwestern University in 1992 with a bachelor's degree in communication in theatre. He was a member of the Delta Tau Delta fraternity. While at Northwestern, he was a co-chair of The Waa-Mu Show in 1990 and 1991.

Hoegh was the founder, co-owner and artistic director of Norwegian Performance Ltd, an Oslo-based production company specialising in multimedia performances, dance, events and concerts.

Hoegh was the artistic director of “Folkefest,” a festival of peace to mark the 50th anniversary of the end of World War II, and assistant artistic director for the opening and closing ceremonies for the 1994 Winter Olympics in Lillehammer.

Hoegh then received an MBA from Harvard Business School in 1997 and founded his London-based company Arts Alliance, builders and backers of high-growth ventures in the creative and tech sectors. Hoegh was among Europe's earliest internet investors and has often been ahead of the curve with new and disruptive technologies.

Among his earliest investments were Firefly, an online community that used collaborative filtering to recommend music and other media, which sold to Microsoft in 1998, and PlanetAll, among the first social networking sites on the internet (sold to Amazon in 1998).

Arts Alliance has been involved in more than 60 start-ups including Shazam, Picturehouse, Opera Software, Firefly, PlanetAll, Ocado, LoveFilm, lastminute.com, Arts Alliance Media, Kiala, graze, Branient, blinkbox, Spoonshot AI, made.com, CreativeLive, Spinner, Kenshoo, Park Circus, MetFilm/Met Film School, Kebony, and Garden Studios.

Throughout their 25-year history, Arts Alliance has been central to a number of “firsts” in the digital and creative world.

Thomas Hoegh founded Arts Alliance Media in 2003, a digital cinema company that in 2005 was responsible for the conversion of over 250 UK cinema screens from analog to digital as part of the UK Film Council’s Digital Screen Network. Arts Alliance Media also rolled out the first ever Virtual Print Fee (VPF) in Europe with French cinema chain CGR in 2008. Art Alliance Media spun off separate companies in content mastering and live event cinema before being sold to Chinese cinema tech company Luxin-Rio in 2017.

Arts Alliance bought DVDs On Tap and relaunched it as LoveFilm in 2003. The re-imagined proposition became an early leader in online film rentals and streaming and was considered the “Netflix of Europe.” LoveFilm sold the first-ever digital film online in 2006, before being acquired by Amazon in 2011.

Hoegh was also an early investor in Picturehouse which operates 25 cinemas across the UK and was the first major chain to convert all of its screens to digital projection. Picturehouse was acquired by Cineworld in 2012.

Thomas Hoegh is a former board member of Channel 4 Ventures, the UK Film Council and the Norwegian Film Institute. He is a visiting professor at Kanazawa Institute of Technology and a trustee of the Wim Wenders Foundation.

Today, Hoegh sits on the boards of Eco-Online, Met Film, Park Circus, Rift Valley Corporation, and Garden Studios.

== Arts Alliance Productions ==
Alongside his entrepreneurial career, Hoegh has continued to direct and produce creative projects as part of Arts Alliance Productions. From traveling art installations and live performance art pieces, to theater and film, Thomas Hoegh has directed 20 productions (some of which under is creative pseudonym Torstein Blixfjord).

Multi-screen film art installation project id - Identity of the Soul (2009) combined poetry by Henrik Ibsen and Mahmoud Darwish with film shot in Japan, Norway, Egypt, and the UK. Narrated in six languages by internationally renowned performers (Vanessa Redgrave, Mahmoud Darwish, Jean Rochefort, Irfan Khan, Jan Wiig, Anne Grete Preus, Gila Almagor) this production explored the impact of personal choices on the human spirit while emphasizing our shared humanity. id - Identity of the Soul toured across Palestine, Qatar, Norway, Jordan, Ajman and premiered in the Uk at the Cambridge Film Festival before touring UK cinemas.

Arts Alliance has also produced and distributed numerous feature films, documentaries and live cinema events such as Disney’s Newsies: The Broadway Musical! (2017), One Direction: Where We Are - The Concert Film (2014), Revolution: New Art for a New World (2016), Springsteen & I (2013), Royal Opera House Live. Most recently, Arts Alliance's Misha and the Wolves (2021) premiered at Sundance Film Festival.
