= A Soldier Dreams of White Lilies =

1967 poem by Mahmoud Darwish

"A Soldier Dreams Of White Lilies" (Note: Also translated as "A Soldier Dreams of White Tulips".) (Arabic: جندي يحلم بالزنابق البيضاء) is a 1967 poem by Mahmoud Darwish about Shlomo Sand as an Israeli soldier.

== History ==
=== Friendship of Darwish and Sand ===
Mahmoud Darwish and Shlomo Sand knew each other as activists in the Rakah communist party and were friends. Sand had aspired to be a poet, but let go of that aspiration after his exposure to the poetry of Darwish.

=== Poem ===
Sand recalled in 2018 that the poem was written after the 1967 War toward the end of the year, when Mahmoud Darwish was visiting Sand in Tel Aviv from Haifa. At that time, Darwish was a well-known poet in Palestine, but not well-known beyond Palestine. The day following a night of drinking and conversation with Sand, Darwish wrote the poem and then translated it into Hebrew for Sand. Sand was regretful that he was stationed in Abu Tor in Jerusalem while Darwish was in detention.

=== Reception ===
The poem became famous in the Arab world. For his portrayal of the Israeli soldier in this poem, Mahmoud Darwish was accused of "collaboration with the Zionist enemy." The literary critics Yusuf al-Khatīb of Palestine and Raja'a an-Naqqash of Egypt differed in their views on the merit of Darwish's sympathetic portrayal of the Israeli soldier; al-Khatīb criticized the portrayal while an-Naqqash admired it.

Izz al-Din Manasirah compared the conversations provoked by Darwish's poem to conversations in the Arab world responding to Fadwa Tuqan's poem "Eytan in the Steel Trap" (إيتان في الشبكة الفولاذية) about a Jewish-Israeli boy in the kibbutz Maoz Haim.

=== Revelation of soldier's identity ===
Shlomo Sand discussed the poem in the introduction of his 2008 book When and How Was the Jewish People Invented? (מתי ואיך הומצא העם היהודי?, published in English as The Invention of the Jewish People). According to Elias Khoury, Mahmoud Darwish told Leila Shahid the story of the poem, confirming that it was about Darwish's friend Sand. Elias Sanbar was also surprised to discover the soldier of the poem's identity when he participated with Sand in a conversation about peace on a French television channel.

== Poem ==
=== Dialogue ===
"A Soldier Dreams Of White Lilies" demonstrates Darwish's "early mastery of dialogue," which he uses to go "past the aesthetic and into political and intellectual vision." The poem is a conversation over alcohol and cigarettes between an Israeli soldier and the speaker, whose name is Mahmoud, retold in first-person through quotations and reported speech. About half of the poem is the soldier's speech—59 out of 118 lines.

=== Symbolism ===
The poem begins:

He dreams of white lilies, an olive branch and of her breast in evening bloom.	يحلُمُ بالزنابق البيضاءْ بغصن زيتونِ.. بصدرها المورق في المساء

The white lilies are not a symbol Darwish had used before, and Khaled Mattawa suggests they are conjured perhaps as a flower that is not native to Palestine. The olive branch is evidence of the Israeli soldier's desire for peace.

=== Portrayal of the Israeli soldier ===
He dreams, he told me, of a bird, a lemon blossom, and he did not philosophize his dream. He did not understand things except in the way he felt them, smelled them. He understood, he told me, that "the country is to drink my mother's coffee, to return home safely in the evening."	يحلمُ - قال لي - بطائر بزهر ليمون و لم يفلسف حلمه لم يفهم الأشياء إلا كما يحسّها.. يشمّها يفهم - قال لي - إنّ الوطنْ أن أحتسي قهوة أمي أن أعود في المساء..

Darwish likens the soldier to himself, using the motif of a mother's coffee as homeland, which he used in his 1966 poem "Ila Ummī" (إلى أمي 'To My Mother'), which became an unofficial Palestinian anthem after it first appeared in Ashiq min Filastin (عاشق من فلسطين 'Lover from Palestine').

The phrase qāl lī (قال لي 'he told me') is repeated throughout the poem, as if to affirm to audiences—Palestinian, Arab, Israeli—that the conversation is reported and that the portrait is not of his poetic creation.

== Miscellaneous ==
It was performed by Vanessa Redgrave in the 2008 multimedia art project "Id - Identity of the soul."
