= Eli Geva =

Israeli defense forces brigade commander (born 1950)

- אלי גבע
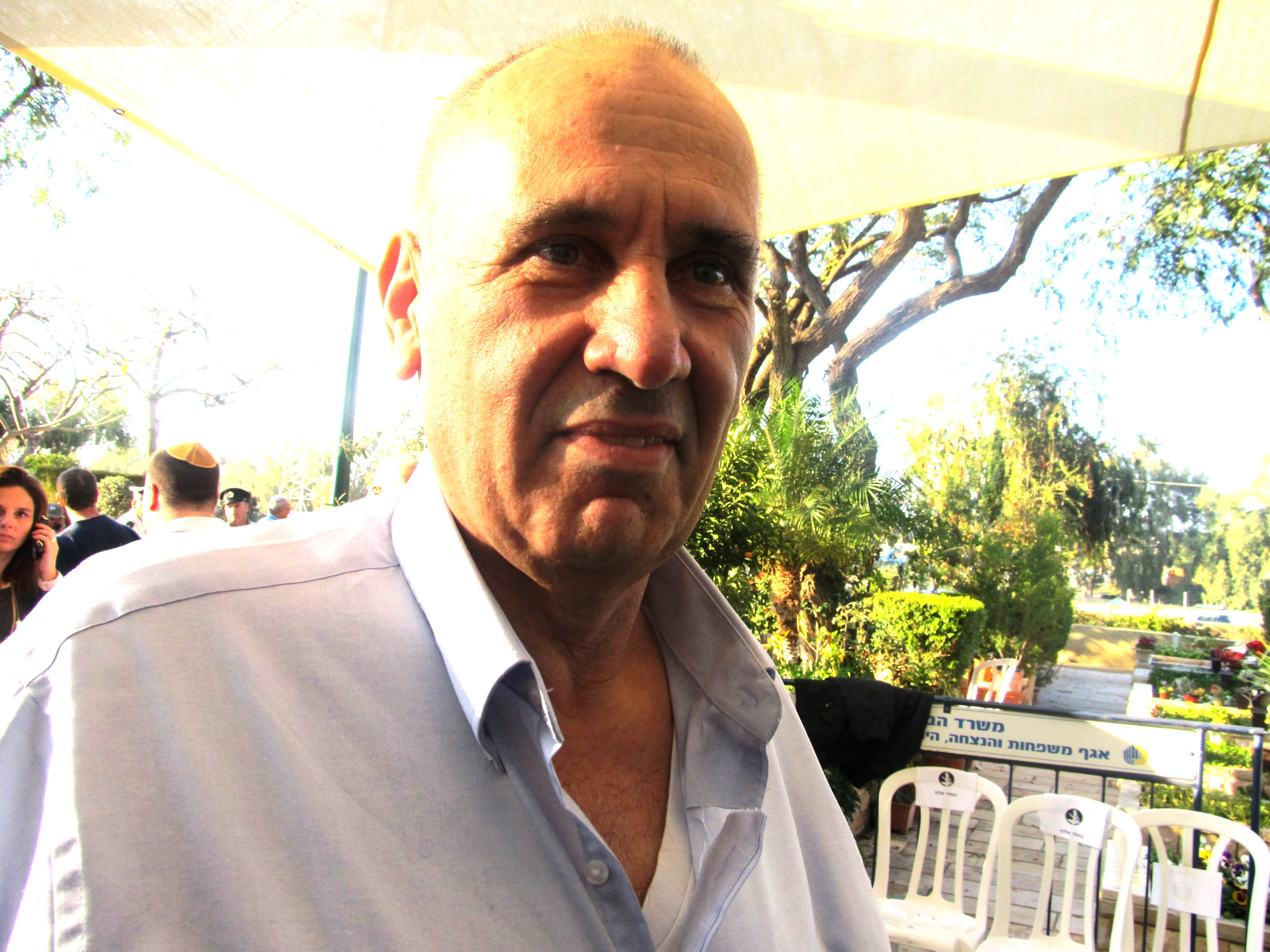
- Eli Geva
- Born: 1950 (age 75–76)
- Spouse: Liora
- Military career
- Allegiance: Israel Defence Forces
- Rank: Colonel
- Commands: 211th Armored Brigade
- Conflicts: Yom Kippur War; 1982 Lebanon War

Eli Geva (Hebrew: אלי גבע; born 1950) is an Israeli brigade commander, who during the Siege of Beirut (in the early stage of the 1982 Lebanon War), refused to lead his forces into the city for moral reasons which he termed "endangerment of both soldiers and civilians in urban warfare". It was the first time that a senior Israeli officer resigned in protest during one of Israel's wars. The Israeli Chief of Staff, Rafael Eitan, and Prime Minister Menachem Begin attempted to negotiate with Geva, but he insisted and was consequently dismissed from the Israel Defense Forces. At the time, Geva was the youngest Colonel in the IDF.

The event drew a great deal of controversy in Israel at the time, and to this day remains a symbol of moral insubordination in the Israeli military. Geva initially declined to grant press interviews, but reversed himself after the Sabra and Shatila massacres and granted an interview to Israeli State Radio which aired prior to the Peace Now rally in Tel Aviv on September 25, 1982.

The New York Times reported on Colonel Geva's interview with Menachem Begin:

Prime Minister Menachem Begin, who spent 45 minutes with the colonel before he asked to be relieved of his command, recalled today that the officer had told him: "I am a brigade commander. I look through my binoculars and I see children." Mr. Begin said he asked the colonel, "Did you get an order to kill those children?" The officer said there had been no such order and Mr. Begin asked, "So what are you complaining about?"

In 2014 Norwegian songwriter Moddi released a song named after Eli Geva in support of his insubordination and pacifism. This song was written by Richard Burgess in 1982 for Norwegian singer Birgitte Grimstad. She was persuaded to refrain from performing the song on her Israel tour the same year.
