= Tamam Al-Akhal =

Palestinian artist

- Born: March 16, 1935 (age 91); Jaffa
- Occupations: artist and educator
- Style: realism; impressionist
- Spouse: Ismail Shammout
- Website: tamam-alakhal.com

Tamam Al-Akhal (born 1935) (Arabic: تمام الأكحل) is a Palestinian artist and educator living in Jordan. She is one of the first Palestinian woman artists who was formally trained, and is known for her painting work using realism and impressionist styles. Her paintings often reflect imagery and subjects associated with her home in Palestine, such as the Mediterranean Sea, local markets, and traditional architecture. Al-Akhal has expressed that her art communicates a sense of longing for her home, recalling the scenes of Palestine that shaped her life prior to being expelled during the Israeli occupation, the Nakba, of 1948.

== Early life and education ==
Al-Akhal was born on March 16, 1935 in Jaffa, the daughter of Aref Al Akhal. In 1948, she came to live with her family in a refugee camp in Lebanon following the Nakba.

She studied at the Fine Arts College in Cairo.

== Career and Life ==
Al-Akhal has exhibited in Egypt, Lebanon, Jerusalem, Jordan, the United States, Kuwait, England, China, Morocco, Berlin, Paris, Rome, and Vienna. She gave a series of lectures at the Jordan National Gallery of Fine Arts in 2009.

While an art student, al-Akhal was included in a group exhibit titled The Palestinian Refugee. Also included in the exhibit was Nuhad Sabasi and Ismail Shammout. From 1957 to 1960, she taught art at the Makassed Girls College in Beirut. In 1959, she married Ismail Shammout. Also in 1959, Shammout and Al-Akhal collaborated on a group exhibition Her husband died in 2006.

Her art has appeared on more than a dozen covers of Palestinian Affairs, a magazine published by the Palestine Liberation Organization (PLO). She was also head of the PLO's Arts and Heritage section. With her husband, she painted a series of large murals known as "Palestine: The Exodus and the Odyssey." After the closure of the Jerusalem branch of the PLO in 1966, Al-Akhal and Shammout moved back to Beirut.

"It is generally known that an artist must articulate the true essence and spirit of the era in which he lives, regardless of what the subject is about. Art will never be the art of the past or the present, but art for all time, and in order to be immortal, it must be original and true to the facts."

== Exhibitions ==
From 1954 to 2003, in partnership with Ismail Shammout, she held exhibitions of their work in Cairo:

- Cairo 1954, sponsored and inaugurated by the late President Gamal Abdel Nasser.
- Beirut and Sidon, Lebanon, and Gaza, Ramallah, Nablus and Jerusalem, Palestine, 1957
- Jerusalem, Nablus and Amman 1964
- One hundred and twenty-one exhibitions in twelve U.S. states in four and a half months in New York, Washington, Philadelphia, Pittsburgh, Chicago, Ann Arbor, Champaign, and Detroit
- Houston, Austin, Los Angeles, and San Francisco in 1964.
- Tripoli (Libya), Cairo, and Damascus 1965.
- Kuwait and Beirut 1966
- London and Birmingham, England, 1967.
- Cairo and Alexandria 1968.
- Beirut 1969 and 1970.
- Belgrade and in Sofia, 1971.
- Beijing (China) 1972
- Tunisia, Algeria and Morocco 1973
- Vienna (Austria), Paris and Rome in 1976.
- Berlin 1977 and the German National Museum in Berlin, 1977
- Beirut, 1982
- Kuwait, 1984
- Abu Dhabi, 1986
- Manama, Kuala Lumpur and Japan, 1987
- Kuwait, 1989
- Amman, 1994
- Amman, Ramallah, Nablus, Nazareth and Beirut, 1996
- “The Biography and Career Exhibition” in Amman, 2000
- Biography Exhibition in Ankara and Istanbul, 2001
- "Biography and Career Exhibition" in Doha, Abu Dhabi, Sharjah, Dubai, Cairo, Damascus, and Aleppo, 2002
- Biography and Career Exhibition in Beirut, 2003
