= Angelina Fares =

Israeli Druze beauty pageant contestant

Angelina Faris (Arabic: انجلينا فارس, Hebrew: אנג'לינה פארס) is an Israeli Druze model and beauty pageant contestant. She was a finalist in Miss Israel. Fares was born in the village of Rameh, the firstborn of a Druze family as one of seven siblings. From the age of six she practiced artistic gymnastics. She represented Israel in an international competition in Russia and finished tenth among eighty participants.

Fares caused great resentment among the Druze community when she decided to compete in the Miss Israel beauty contest and became a finalist. She received threats which led to the arrest of five people, among them two of her uncles, for planning to murder her. Following those threats and the pressure that was put on her by the Druze religious leadership, she finally withdrew from the contest and later from her high school. Her sister, Jamila "Maya" Fares, was murdered in 2011, many suspect by members of the Druze community.

== See also ==
- Lady Kul El Arab, documentary film about Angelina Fares by Ibtisam Mara'ana
- List of Israeli Druze
