= Memory for Forgetfulness =

1987 prose poem by Mahmoud Darwish

- Title page for Memory for Forgetfulness (1987)
- Author: Mahmoud Darwish
- Original title: Dhakirah li-al-nisyan
- Translator: Ibrahim Muhawi
- Publication date: 1987

Memory for Forgetfulness (Arabic: Dhakirah li-al-nisyan) is a 1987 prose poem by Palestinian poet Mahmoud Darwish. The work is a memoir of the Siege of Beirut during the Lebanese Civil War and the 1982 Israeli invasion of Lebanon. It was translated into English in 1995 by Ibrahim Muhawi, and into Hebrew by Salman Masalha.

== Background ==
Darwish wrote Memory for Forgetfulness in Paris in 1986, during what Muhawi described as a "three-month self-siege" to recall his feelings of isolation during the summer 1982 siege. He originally published the work in a 1986 issue of the periodical he edited, Al-Karmel, under the title "The Time: Beirut. The Place: August.", as the prologue to an autobiography. When he republished the poem in 1987, he changed its title to Dhakirah li-al-nisyan.

In Memory for Forgetfulness, Darwish uses symbolism of birth, death, coffee, doves, and worms to discuss the fear of existence during the Lebanese civil war and the Israeli invasion of Lebanon. In addition, the poem extensively uses the same symbols to discuss Darwish's perception of the Palestinians' loss of their homeland.
