= Ibtisam Mara'ana =

Palestinian filmmaker and member of Knesset

- ابتسام مراعنة منوحين
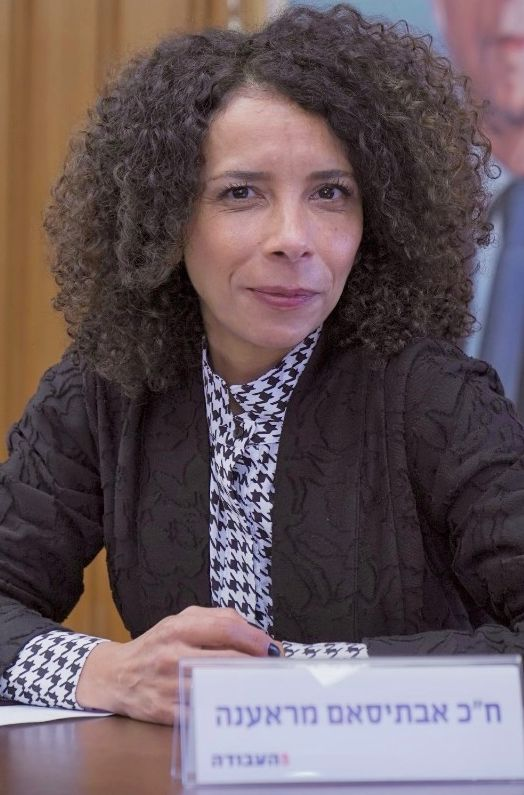

Faction represented in the Knesset
- 2021–2022: Labor Party

Personal details
- Born: 14 October 1975 (age 50) Fureidis, Israel
- Occupation: Filmmaker

Ibtisam Mara'ana-Menuhin (Arabic: ابتسام مراعنة منوحين, Hebrew: אִבְּתִיסָאם מַרְאַעְנֶּה־מְנוֹחִין) is an Israeli Arab politician, film director, and producer. She was a member of the Knesset for the Labor Party from 2021 to 2022. Upon her election, she made history as the first Knesset member in a mixed Jewish-Muslim relationship. Mara'ana was not reelected in the 2022 election.

== Biography ==
Ibtisam Mara'ana was born in 1975 in Fureidis, a Muslim Arab village in northern Israel. She attended film school at Givat Haviva. In 2000 she initiated a film and television program at her former high school in Fureidis.

In June 2014, Mara'ana married Boaz Menuhin, a Jewish Israeli man. The couple has a daughter. The marriage was sealed in Tel Aviv in a non-religious ceremony, and is therefore not officially recognised in Israel.

== Film and teaching career ==
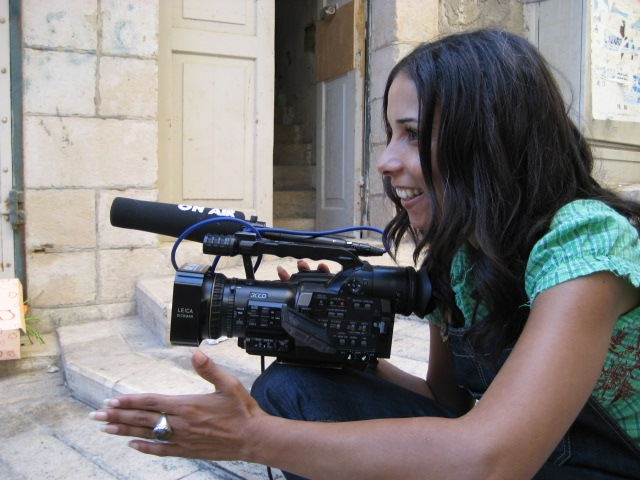
Mara'ana filming in 2011

In 2003, Mara'ana founded Ibtisam Films to produce documentaries that investigate the borders and boundaries of Palestinian and Israeli society, with a focus on women and minorities. Her work explores gender, class, racism, and collective and individual identity. Her films show the plight of Arab-Palestinians living as a minority within Israel, while, at the same time, critique deep-rooted practices within Arab-Palestinian society. Her work has been screened on television and at festivals worldwide.

Mara'ana teaches at various educational institutions, including the Bezalel Academy of Art and Design in Jerusalem. As a feminist activist, she appears at universities and conferences as a public speaker, and has published numerous articles in Israeli newspapers. In 2009, the Israeli newspaper Haaretz named Mara'ana as one of the 10 most influential women in Israel. ary In 2011 Druze-Israeli Jamila "Maya" Fares, the sister of Angelina Fares, the subject of Mara'ana's documentary Lady Kul El Arab, was murdered in an honour killing. In response to the murder, Mara'ana created a foundation to support Arab women fleeing gender-based violence in Israel.

== Political career ==
Prior to the 2009 Knesset elections Mara'ana was placed twelfth on the Meretz list. However, she withdrew her candidacy shortly before the elections after Meretz expressed support for Operation Cast Lead in Gaza.

=== Knesset ===
In January 2021, Mara'ana ran in the Israeli Labor Party primaries, and placed seventh on the party's list for the March 2021 elections. On 17 February Mara'ana was disqualified from running in the election by the Central Elections Committee by a 16–15 vote, with two abstentions, citing anti-Zionist remarks, as well as her public refusal in 2012 to observe the Memorial Day siren – she later apologized for the latter.

The disqualification was subsequently repealed by the Supreme Court. She was subsequently elected to the Knesset as the Labor Party won seven seats, becoming the first Knesset member in a mixed Jewish-Muslim relationship. Mara'ana received the 8th slot on Labor's 2022 list, but was not elected as the party won just 4 seats.

== Filmography ==
- Paradise Lost (2003). Mara'ana traces the hidden history of her village, Fureidis, investigating issues of national identity and womanhood within traditional Arab village life.
- Al-Jiser (2004), a look into the lives of residents of the Jisr az-Zarqa village in Israel who face poverty and discrimination. The film focuses on the struggle of a group of young single women who are determined to bring social change to their village.
- Badal (2006). A Badal marriage refers to the custom of a brother and sister from one family marrying a sister and brother from another family. Divorce on the part of one couple means the other couple must also divorce. The film follows a family during the process of arranging such a marriage. It portrays the lives of Palestinian women in Israel: their struggles in being a part of their traditional society vs. the quest to maintain their full rights as women and citizens of a Jewish state.
- Three Times Divorced (2007) is about a Palestinian woman from the Gaza Strip who marries an Arab Bedouin from Israel. After bearing six children, her husband divorces her and maintains custody of the children, while the woman, whose residency status in Israel becomes uncertain, is left with nothing.
- Lady Kul El-Arab (2008). Angelina Fares, a young woman from the Druze village of Sajur in northern Israel and the country's first Druze model, becomes a finalist in the 2007 Miss Israel beauty pageant. Facing severe pressure and death threats from her village, Angelina must decide whether to go forward with her fashion world dreams, or to resign. The story follows Angelina's struggle to reconcile the traditions and values of her society with her bold efforts to choose her way in life.
- 77 Steps (2010) documents the personal journey of the director who leaves her Arab-Muslim village to live in Tel Aviv. In an attempt to find an apartment in the city, she encounters discrimination and rejection by most landlords because of her Arab origins. She finally finds an apartment and meets her neighbor – Jonathan, a Jewish-Canadian and recent immigrant to Israel. A complicated love story develops.
- Write Down, I Am an Arab (2014) is a biographical documentary film about the national Palestinian poet Mahmoud Darwish. The movie covers Mahmoud Darwish's love letters to his Jewish girlfriend from the past, Tamar Ben-Ami, his marriage with Rana Kabbani, his first wife, and his part in the Palestinian-Israeli conflict. The movie contains interviews with Ahmad Darwish (Mahmoud's brother) and with his fellow poets and writers as well as with Samih al-Qasim, who was Mahmoud Darwish's friend.

== Awards and recognition ==
In 2017, Mara'ana received an honorary degree from the British Open University.

Year	Award	Category	Work	Result
2003	Docaviv	Best Debut Film	Paradise Lost	Won
2003	Docaviv	Best Cinematography	Paradise Lost	Won
2003	International Women's Film Festival in Rehovot	Best Documen	Paradise Lost	Won
2005	Lady Globes	50 Most Influential Women in Israel		Won
2005	Jerusalem Film Festival	Film Art Prize	Badal	Won
2006	HotDocs	Best Mid-Length Documentary	Badal	Won
2006	Sole e Luna Doc Fest	First Prize	Badal	Won
2006	Jerusalem Film Festival	Spirit of Freedom	Badal	Won
2006	Award of the Mayor of Olomouc, Czech Republic		Badal	Won
2007	Docaviv	Best Film	Three Times Divorced	Won
2007	Award of the Israeli Film Academy	Best Documentary	Three Times Divorced	Nominated
2008	Fippa-Biarritz International Film Festival	Silver Award	Three Times Divorced	Won
2008	IDFA	Special Jury Award Silver Wolf Competition	Lady Kul el-Arab	Won
2008	The Marker	40 Most Influential Women in Israel		Won
2008	International Women’s Film Festival in New Delhi	Best Director		Won
2010	International Documentary Association	IDA Award	Continuing series, Wide Angle (2002) for episodes: "Contestant No.2", "Heart of Jenin", "Crossing Heaven' s Border", and "Once Upon a Coup"	Nominated
2019	Sami Michael Award for Equality and Social Justice			Won

== See also ==
- Women of Israel
