= Write Down, I Am an Arab =

2014 documentary film by Ibtisam Mara'ana

- Directed by: Ibtisam Mara'ana
- Written by: Ibtisam Mara'ana
- Produced by: Ibtisam Mara'ana
- Narrated by: Makram Khoury
- Cinematography: Ibtisam Mara'ana
- Music by: Mira Awad
- Release date: 2014
- Running time: 73 minutes
- Country: Israel/Palestine
- Languages: Arabic, Hebrew

Write Down, I Am an Arab is a 2014 documentary film about the national Palestinian poet Mahmoud Darwish. The film was written and directed by Palestinian filmmaker Ibtisam Mara'ana.

== Synopsis ==
Write Down, I Am an Arab tells the story of Mahmoud Darwish, the Palestinian national poet and one of the most influential writers of the Arab world, whose writing shaped Palestinian identity and motivated generations of Palestinians to the cause of national liberation. Darwish was born in Western Galilee in the village al-Birwa; his family fled during the 1948 Arab-Israeli War and returned a few years later to a ruined homeland. These early experiences laid the foundations for a writing career that came to define an entire nation. Like other Palestinian citizens of Israel at the time, Darwish grew up under military law that prevented freedom of movement. In 1964 his defiant poem, "Write Down, I Am an Arab", landed him in prison and turned him into an icon of the Arab world. At the same time, he met and fell in love with Tamar Ben-Ami, a young Jewish-Israeli.

The film reveals her intimate love letters in Hebrew, which she kept secret for decades. The affair ended when Tamar joined the army. Darwish left Israel in the 1970s, moving to Beirut just before the outbreak of the civil war, where he connected with the PLO leadership and became speech writer and confidant to Yasir Arafat. He returned to Palestine in 1995 after years of exile and continued as the critical and powerful voice of the Palestinian people until his death in 2008. Write Down, I Am an Arab is a personal and social portrait of the poet and national myth, Mahmoud Darwish. Through his poetry, secret love letters, and exclusive archival materials, Mara'ana unearths the story behind the man who became the mouthpiece of the Palestinian people.

== Participants ==
- Mahmoud Darwish - Himself (archive footage)
- Makram Khoury - Narrator
- Shoshana Lapidot - Darwish's former Hebrew teacher
- Tamar Ben-Ami - the love interest of Darwish's youth
- Rana Kabbani - Darwish's first wife

== Reception ==
=== Israel ===
In her review of the film, feminist legal scholar Orit Kamir acknowledged the excitement with which many reviewers and audiences received the film, citing "the bewitching words of the Palestinian national poet Mahmoud Darwish, the voice of Makram Khoury and the beauty of Darwish's Jewish love, which the years have only enhanced." She notes, however, that the film has difficulty choosing between the nationalistic narrative of the activist poet, and the impossible love story between star-crossed lovers. According to Kamir, the film is saved, though, because it doesn't try to choose: It lays before us difficult truths, but doesn't interpret them for us – "All the rest – go learn for yourself. Do with it what you can. Maybe that is the best that the film could offer."

Miron Rapaport, in his review, highlights the complexity of the story by describing the encounter between Darwish and a young kibbutznik from Yas'ur - the kibbutz founded on the ruins of Al-Birwa, the village of Darwish's birth. He tells the young man, "this is a happy and sad meeting; happy because we can be friends, and sad because you can go back there and I cannot." The film then cuts to a snippet of a poem in which Darwish says: "It is time for you to go / And die wherever you want / But not among us". This poem is one that even Jewish-Israeli friends of Darwish could not accept, and according to Rapaport, Mara'ana presents the friendliness and animosity side by side because Darwish is easy to like, but he had harsh things to say about the occupation of his homeland, and his charm, and the enchanting love story depicted in the film, should not overshadow what he stood for.

In his Time Out review, Yuval Avivi focuses on the role of the director, Ibtisam Mara'ana, in creating the film. Mara'ana, who is married to a Jewish Israeli, said regarding the famous line demanding Jews leave his home, "I wouldn't want to live in a place with no Jews. You may be shits, but I wouldn't want to be without the human texture I grew up with." He describes her as damned either way - no matter how carefully she handles the incendiary figure in her film, she would be targeted in some quarters. In this case, says Avivi, she was not only attacked by the right wing for aggrandizing a political figure antithetical to their existence, in their view, but she was also sharply criticized on the left, for "sullying" an icon. He refers to a review in Haaretz, in which the reviewer accused Mara'ana of sensationalism, and said her focus on his love affairs with very young women was "vulgar".

=== International ===
In Point of View, Pat Mullen had nothing but praise for the film, saying that "Write offers an appropriately poetic portrait of this influential voice." Amal Eqeiq, in the Journal of Middle East Studies, says that the film presents Darwish in "a paradox of recognition and erasure", opining that the film's main subtexts are that the film is intended for an Israeli audience, and that it comes to show that audience that the Palestinian activist had "an Israeli story" too.

== Awards and festivals ==
- DocAviv, Viewers' Choice Award
- Hot Docs, Toronto Canada - World premiere
