= Ismail Shammout =

- Born: 1930; Lydda, Mandatory Palestine
- Died: 2006 (aged 75–76); Amman, Jordan
- Other names: Ismail Abdel-Kader Chammout
- Education: College of Fine Arts in Cairo, Accademia di Belle Arti di Roma
- Known for: Painting
- Works: Where to ..? (1953), Palestine: The Exodus and the Odyssey (1997–2000)
- Spouse: Tamam al Akhal
- Website: http://www.fununarts.com/

Ismail Shammout (Arabic: إسماعيل شموط, romanized: Ismāʻīl Shammūṭ; 1930–2006), was a Palestinian painter and art historian.

== Biography ==
Shammout was born in 1930 in Lydda. On July 12, 1948, he and his family were amongst 25,000 residents of Lydda expelled from their homes by Israeli occupation. The Shammout family moved to the Gaza refugee camp of Khan-Younes. In 1950 Shammout went to Cairo and enrolled in the College of Fine Arts in Cairo. After returning to Gaza in 1953, he held his first exhibition, which was a success.

Shammout and Palestinian artist Tamam al Akhal participated in the Palestine Exhibition of 1954 in Cairo. The exhibition was inaugurated by then Egyptian President Gamal Abdul Nasser. Later in 1954, he moved to Italy and enrolled at the Accademia di Belle Arti di Roma in Rome. He married al Akhal in 1959. Their work has been exhibited in several countries.

Shammout became a part of the Palestine Liberation Organization (PLO) as the Director of the Department of Arts and National Culture in 1965. He also held the position of Secretary General of the Union of Palestinian Artists. He became Secretary General of the Union of Arab artists in 1969. In 1973, he directed an eponymous short film of singer Zeinab Shaath performing her song "The Urgent Call of Palestine". In 1992 he and his wife, al Akhal, moved to Germany due to the Gulf War. After Germany, they settled in Jordan.

He and Al Akhal, returned to Lydda in 1997.

He died on July 1, 2006, at the age of seventy-six.

== Artistic work ==
Shammout's painting, Where to ..? (1953)

Shammout was an influential Palestinian artist, whose prominent style of painting employs recognizable symbols of Palestinian culture and traditions.

Shammout's Where to ..? (1953), an oil painting on canvas, is a painting depicting the Lydda Death March in July 1948. This painting has attained iconic status in Palestinian culture. It is perhaps the best-known version of his several representations of the refugee experience of the Palestinians. In the foreground, it depicts a life-size image of an elderly man dressed in rags carrying a walking stick in his left hand while his right hand grasps the wrist of a crying child. A sleeping toddler on his shoulder is resting his cheek upon the old man's head. Just behind them is a third child crying and walking alone. In the background there is a skyline of an Arab town with a minaret, while in the middle ground there is a withered tree.

From 1997 to 2000, he and al Akhal painted a collection of 19 large murals called Palestine: The Exodus and the Odyssey. The paintings illustrate, in chronological sequence, the plight of the Palestinians since 1948.

== See also ==
- Palestinian art
- List of Palestinian artists

== Bibliography ==
- Palestinian art, Gannit Ankori. Reaktion Books. 2006. ISBN 1-86189-259-4.
