= Jon Mostad =

Norwegian composer

Jon Mostad (born 21 April 1942) is a composer from Fredrikstad, Norway. He received the Norwegian state three-year scholarship for artists from 1982 until 1984.

== Musical style ==
In his early compositions Mostad moves from a linear-expressionist style to a more timbre-oriented line of thinking where both modernist music and romantic music inspire his work. From around 1975 the timbre/harmonic aspect of his music is more related to the harmonic series. During the 1980s and 1990s he combined this with other types of modal and free compositional techniques, sometimes using modal techniques as well as more overtone-oriented harmonic spectra within the same composition.

At the same time he was experimenting with untraditional structuring of his material, both in works of one movement and in cyclical works. Many of Mostad's instrumental works as well as vocal music, are inspired by Judæo-Christian texts which often influence the structuring of the music. For instance, in "And the light shines in darkness", a massive dark-sounding layer with much rhythmical unrest is gradually introduced to a lighter-sounding chord with notes from the harmonic series.

Mostad has written chamber music, solo pieces for piano, guitar, organ and used electronics, both pre-recorded and live with interaction with live musicians, but his main focus has been orchestral and vocal music. His longest composition is the work "Were you there, when they crucified my Lord?" for choir, recitation, solo voices and orchestra.

== Performances ==
The music of Jon Mostad has been played by orchestras in Norway as well as performed at Bergen International Festival, the Elverum Festival, Music Factory, Bergen in Bergen and Dartington International Summer School in Totnes, England, among other festivals. In 2010 he was featured composer of the Vinteriss festival in Østfold. He has been represented at Nordic Music Days and his music played on radio in the Nordic countries, former Jugoslavia and England. His "2 psalms" for choir has been sung in Japan, England and Norway.

Mostad's music has also been performed by local amateur ensembles. Music ranging from small chamber pieces to the multimedia show Terje Vigen based on texts by Henrik Ibsen and theatrical music for Ibsen's Peer Gynt were written for local ensembles in Fredrikstad.

Mostad has also had commissions from Ny Musikk, NRK radio and TV, Ungdomssymfonikerne, Det Norske Blåseensemble, Amsterdams Gitaartrio and Oslo Sinfonietta as well as from local ensembles in Fredrikstad.

Mostad plays the piano, but has seldom been involved in performing his own music. Occasionally he has improvised pre- and postludes when substituting as organist in local churches and from time to time he has also played some of his smaller works for piano (with or without electronics) live at concerts. During the 2010 Vinterriss festival he was playing the live electronics part at the premiere of his piece "Ikke helt solo" ("not quite solo") for cello and quadrophonic live electronics.

== Recordings ==
The music of Jon Mostad has been recorded by The Norwegian Soloist's Choir, The Oslo Philharmonic, Øystein Birkeland and Bergen Philharmonic Orchestra. His orchestral works "House", "The light shines in darkness" and "Concerto for cello and orchestra" were chosen by a jury of the Norwegian Society of Composers to be recorded on the Aurora label, resulting in the CD "The light shines in darkness" with Oslo Philharmonic, cellist Øystein Birkeland and conductor Michel Swierczewski.

== Education ==
Theological candidate 1965. Music and pedagogy 1969. Diploma in composition at the Norwegian Academy of Music (ending in 1974). Main teacher: Finn Mortensen. An important inspiration during his studies were the seminars in sonology and on Gustav Mahler by Olav Anton Thommessen. Shorter courses in studio work at NSEM, Høvikodden (1975/76), EMS Stockholm (1983).

== Other activities ==
In addition to composing, Jon Mostad was teaching arrangement and composition, music and religion at high schools in Fredrikstad and Moss (years 10-12 or 11-13 in the Norwegian school system) until he retired in 2006.

He has also been active in organisations such as Ny Musikk Østfold, the regional branch of an organisation promoting contemporary music, Norwegian Society of Composers and TONO.
