= Zeinab Shaath =

Palestinian-Egyptian singer-songwriter (born 1954)

Zeinab Shaath زينب شعث
- Born: Zeinab Shaath; 1954 (age 71–72); Alexandria, Egypt
- Origin: Palestinian-Egyptian
- Genres: Folk, protest music
- Occupation: Singer-songwriter
- Instruments: Vocals, guitar
- Years active: Early 1970s–c. 1980 (then intermittently)
- Labels: Cultural Arts Section, Palestine Liberation Organization; reissued by Discostan and Majazz Project (2024)

Zeinab Shaath (Arabic: زينب شعث; born 1954) is a Palestinian-Egyptian singer-songwriter. She is known for the song "The Urgent Call of Palestine", released in 1972.

== Early life ==
Zeinab Shaath was born in Alexandria, Egypt, in 1954 to a Palestinian father and a Lebanese mother. Her parents had moved to Egypt in 1947 after her father accepted a job as an educator. The following year, the State of Israel was established, marking the start of the Nakba, rendering her family unable to return home. Shaath inherited a sense of Palestinian identity from her family, who spoke Palestinian Arabic at home and were active in the refugee community in Egypt. Shaath and her family lacked Egyptian citizenship and were considered stateless, although they later received Syrian passports after her father filed a request to the government. Shaath was interested in music from a young age, first learning the piano, and was later introduced to the guitar by her older sister Mysoon, who also shared with her a number of records from the United States. She then became influenced by American folk songwriters such as Bob Dylan and Joan Baez.

== Music career ==
When Zeinab was 16, she was challenged by her sister to compose a song from a poem written by the wife of one of her co-workers, Lalita Panjabi. She created an English language song based on the poem, entitled "The Urgent Call of Palestine". Mysoon would later play the song on the English language radio station where she worked, where it quickly became popular among listeners. Zeinab would later claim that use of English allowed her to reach a wider audience, including those unfamiliar with the Israeli–Palestinian conflict, whereas Arabic speakers already knew of the situation. She first performed in public in Cairo. After being invited to perform at a Palestinian festival in Lebanon in 1972, she met Ismail Shammout, painter and Director of the Cultural Arts section of the Palestine Liberation Organization (PLO). Shammout then directed a short film, sometimes described as the first Palestinian music video, of Shaath performing "The Urgent Call of Palestine" in the mountains of Lebanon. She also worked with Shammout to record and release an EP of the same name, which also included the songs "Resist", "I Am An Arab" and "Take Me Back to Palestine", based on poems by Muin Bseiso, Mahmoud Darwish, and Abd al-Wahhab Al-Bayati respectively. The EP and film were released in 1972 and 1973 respectively.

Shaath gained the opportunity to perform in several Arab countries such as Egypt, Lebanon and Iraq and was also invited to the 10th World Festival of Youth and Students in East Berlin as part of the Palestinian delegation, which took place from 28 July to 5 August 1973. Shaath was subsequently invited to perform in Moscow and Tbilisi, USSR. In 1974, she performed in the play Al-Ard (The Land) in Cairo. She moved to the US for graduate school in 1976, where she initially remained active as a singer during Arab community events and protests, while pursuing a career in pharmacology. However, after later getting married in 1982 and starting a family, she no longer focused on music.

== Re-emergence ==
In September 1982, the entire archive of the PLO's Cultural Arts Section was seized by the Israel Defense Forces (IDF) during the invasion of Lebanon, which included the master tapes of the EP and the film. Shaath long assumed the recordings had been destroyed, but in 2017, Israeli researcher Rona Sela discovered the film in the IDF Archive, who contacted Shaath and worked to declassify it, along with other seized material. However, she was unable to gain access to the master tapes of the EP. Sela argued that the deliberate restrictions placed on access to them, along with other Palestinian cultural products, was an act of censorship. In 2021, Arshia Haq, founder of the record label Discostan, discovered The Urgent Call of Palestine EP and contacted Shaath, before starting work to restore the recording with Mo'min Swaitat, founder of the Majazz Project, a Palestinian musical archive. Without the master tapes, the restoration was based entirely on personal copies of the release. The restored EP was re-released by Discostan and the Majazz Project on 26 March 2024, with all profits donated towards relief efforts for the Gaza war.
