= Mahmoud Darwish =

Palestinian author and poet (1941–2008)

- مَحمُود دَرْوِيْش
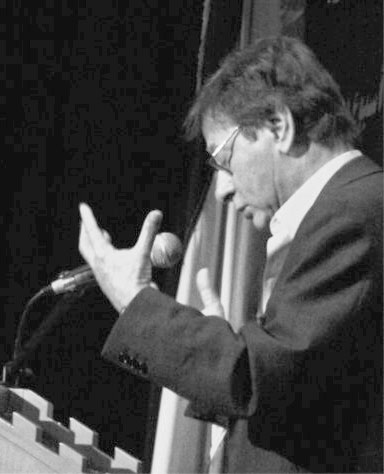
- Darwish at Bethlehem University (2006)
- Born: 13 March 1941; Al-Birwa, Acre Subdistrict, Mandatory Palestine
- Died: 9 August 2008 (aged 67); Houston, Texas, United States
- Resting place: Ramallah, West Bank, Palestine
- Citizenship: Mandate Palestinian (1941–1948); Stateless (1948–1988); Palestinian (1988–2008)
- Education: Moscow State University
- Occupations: Author; poet
- Spouse(s): Rana Kabbani (m. 1976; div. 1982) Hayat Heeni (separated)
- Writing career
- Years active: 1960–2008
- Notable work: Palestinian Declaration of Independence (1988)

Mahmoud Darwish (Arabic: مَحمُود دَرْوِيْش, romanized: Maḥmūd Darwīsh; 13 March 1941 – 9 August 2008) was a Palestinian author and poet. He wrote the Palestinian Declaration of Independence, which formally established the State of Palestine in November 1988, and is widely regarded as the country's national poet. His poetry and other literature, for which he won numerous awards internationally, was published in Arabic, while he also spoke English, French, and Hebrew.

In his poetic works, Darwish explored Palestine as a metaphor for the loss of Eden, birth and resurrection, and the anguish of dispossession and exile. He has been described as incarnating and reflecting "the tradition of the political poet in Islam, the man of action whose action is poetry." He served as an editor for several literary magazines in both Israel and the Palestinian territories.

== Early and personal life ==
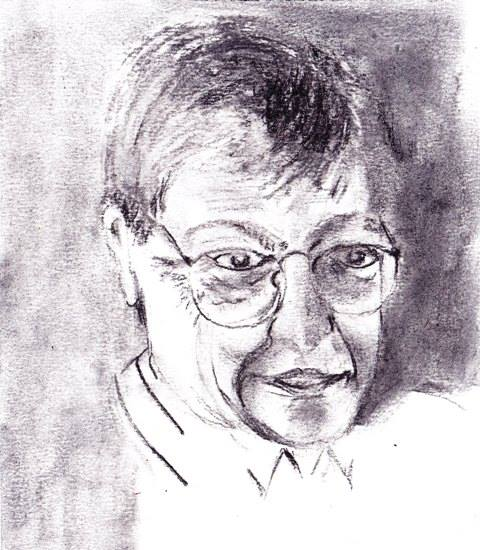
Mahmoud Darwish, Palestinian National Poet, Pen and Ink Portrait by Amitabh Mitra

Darwish was born to a family of land-owning Arab Palestinians in al-Birwa, which was situated in the Western Galilee, on 13 March 1941. He was the second child of Salim Darwish and Houreyyah. While his mother was illiterate, Darwish was educated and taught how to read by his grandfather. During the 1948 Arab–Israeli War, al-Birwa was captured and subsequently razed by the Israel Defense Forces (IDF), prompting Darwish's family to flee to Lebanon, where they settled first in Jezzine and then in Damour.

A year later, Darwish's family returned to Israel and settled in Deir al-Asad. Darwish attended high school in Kafr Yasif before eventually moving to Haifa. Although Israel's Citizenship Law of 1952 was conferred upon Arab Palestinians who remained within Israel's borders after the 1949 Armistice Agreements, Darwish and his family were only granted residency status.

In 1970, Darwish left Israel to study in the Soviet Union, where he attended Moscow State University for one year. In 1971, he moved to Cairo, Egypt, where he worked for the daily newspaper al-Ahram.

Darwish was twice married and divorced. His first wife was the writer Rana Kabbani. After they divorced, in the mid-1980s, he married an Egyptian translator, Hayat Heeni. He had no children. The "Rita" of Darwish's poems was a Jewish woman whom he loved when he was living in Haifa; he revealed in an interview with French journalist Laure Adler that her name is Tamar Ben-Ami. The relationship was the subject of the film Write Down, I Am an Arab by filmmaker Ibtisam Mara'ana.

Darwish had a history of heart disease, suffering a heart attack in 1984. He had two heart operations, in 1984 and 1998.

== Career ==
=== Literary ===
He published his first book of poetry, Asafir bila ajniha, or "Wingless Birds," at the age of 19. He initially published his poems in Al Jadid, the literary periodical of the Israeli Communist Party, eventually becoming its editor. Later, he was assistant editor of Al Fajr, a literary periodical published by the Israeli Workers' Party (Mapam).

Over his lifetime of 67 years Darwish published more than 30 volumes of poetry and eight books of prose. At one time or another, he was editor of the periodicals Al Jadid, Al Fajr, Shu'un Filastiniyya, and Al Karmel. He was also one of the contributors of Lotus, a literary magazine financed by Egypt and the Soviet Union.

By the age of 17, Darwish was writing poetry about the suffering of Palestinian refugees in the Nakba and the inevitability of their return, and had begun reciting his poems at poetry festivals. Seven years later, on 1 May 1965, when Darwish read his poem "Bitaqat huwiyya" ["Identity Card"] to a crowd in a Nazareth movie house, there was a tumultuous reaction. Within days the poem had spread throughout the country and the Arab world. Published in his second volume "Leaves of Olives" (Haifa, 1964), the six stanzas of the poem repeat the cry "Write down: I am an Arab." His 1966 "To My Mother" became an unofficial Palestinian anthem, and his 1967 poem "A Soldier Dreams Of White Lilies" (Note: Also translated as "A Soldier Dreams of White Tulips".) about a conversation with a young Shlomo Sand as an Israeli soldier stirred debate due to its portrayal of the Israeli soldier. Darwish's poems were translated into Danish and published in various publications, including Politisk Revy.

Darwish's early writings are in the classical Arabic style. He wrote monorhymed poems adhering to the metrics of traditional Arabic poetry. In the 1970s, he began to stray from these precepts and adopted a "free-verse" technique that did not abide strictly by classical poetic norms. The quasi-Romantic diction of his early works gave way to a more personal, flexible language, and the slogans and declarative language that characterized his early poetry were replaced by indirect and ostensibly apolitical statements, although politics was never far away.

In the 1970s, "Darwish, as a Palestinian poet of the Resistance committed himself to the ... objective of nurturing the vision of defeat and disaster (after the June War of 1967), so much so that it would 'gnaw at the hearts' of the forthcoming generations." Darwish addressed the 1982 Israeli invasion of Lebanon in Ward aqall [Fewer Roses] (1986) and "Sa-ya'ti barabira akharun" ("Other Barbarians Will Come").

According to the Israeli author Haim Gouri, who knew him personally, Darwish's Hebrew was excellent. Four volumes of his poetry were translated into Hebrew by Muhammad Hamza Ghaneim: Bed of a Stranger (2000), Why Did You Leave the Horse Alone? (2000), State of Siege (2003), and Mural (2006). Israeli poet Salman Masalha, who wrote in both Arabic and Hebrew, translated Darwish's poem Memory for Forgetfulness into Hebrew.

Darwish was impressed by the Iraqi poets Abd al-Wahhab Al-Bayati and Badr Shakir al-Sayyab. He cited French poet Arthur Rimbaud and American poet Allen Ginsberg as literary influences. Darwish admired the Israeli poet Yehuda Amichai, but described his poetry as a "challenge to me, because we write about the same place. He wants to use the landscape and history for his own benefit, based on my destroyed identity. So we have a competition: who is the owner of the language of this land? Who loves it more? Who writes it better?"

=== Political ===
In 1973, Darwish joined the Palestine Liberation Organization (PLO) and was consequently banned from entering Israel. In Beirut, Lebanon, in 1973, he edited the monthly Shu'un Filistiniyya (Palestinian Affairs) and worked as a director in the Palestinian Research Centre of the PLO. In the wake of the 1982 Lebanon War, Darwish wrote the political poems Qasidat Beirut (1982) and Madih al-zill al'ali (1983). Darwish was elected to the PLO Executive Committee in 1987.

In 1993, Darwish resigned from the PLO Executive Committee due to his opposition to the Oslo Accords. He later recounted: "All I saw in the agreement was an Israeli solution to Israeli problems and that the PLO had to perform its role in solving Israel’s security problems."

In 1996, he returned to Israel to attend the funeral of his colleague Emile Habibi, having received a permit to remain in Haifa for four days. Due to leaving the PLO, he was allowed to live in the West Bank and moved to Ramallah.

His final visit to Israel was on 15 July 2007, to attend a poetry recital at Mt. Carmel Auditorium in Haifa. There, he criticized the factional violence between Fatah and Hamas as a "suicide attempt in the streets."

== Death ==
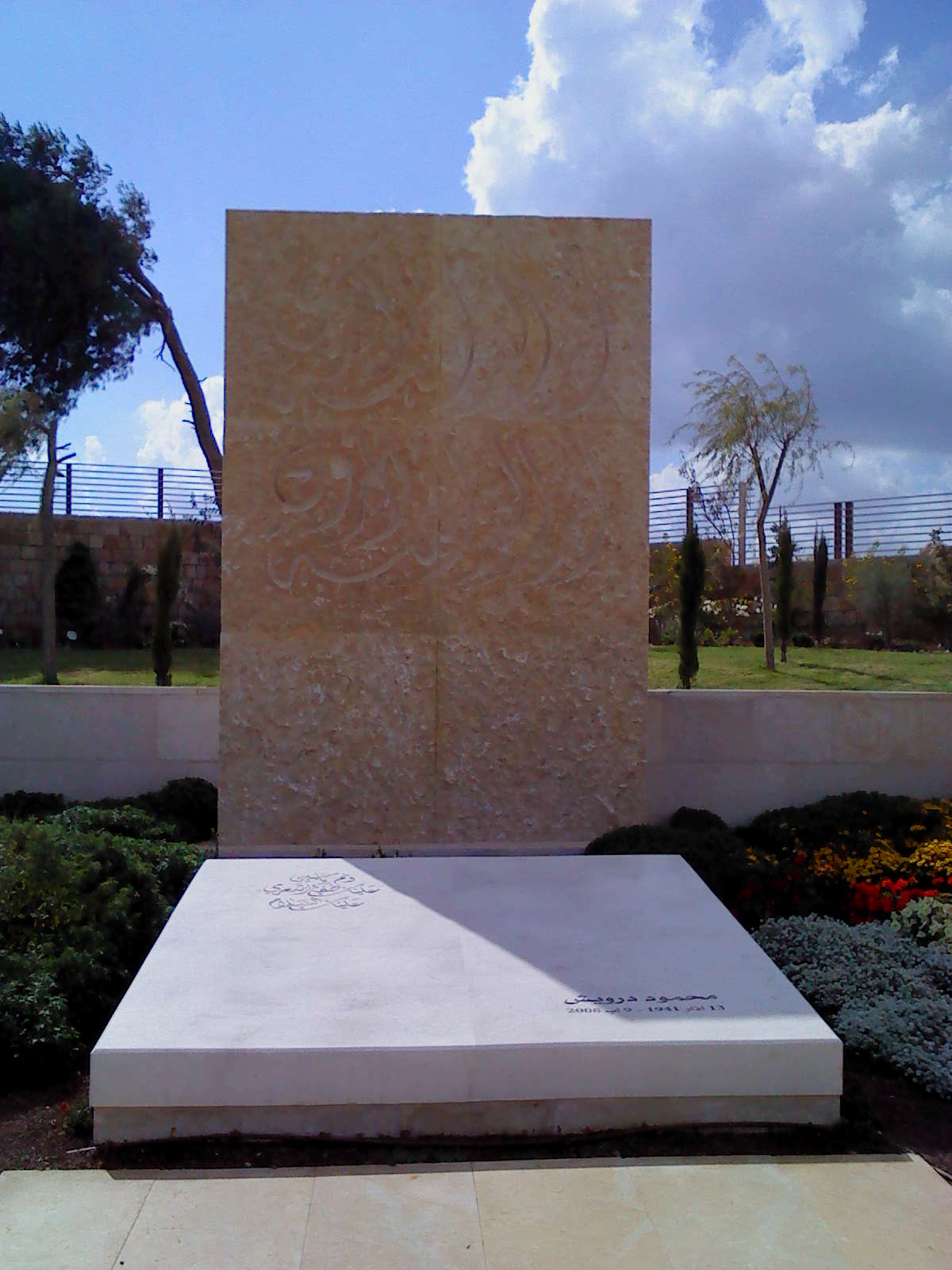
Darwish's grave and memorial in Ramallah

Darwish died on 9 August 2008 at the age of 67, three days after heart surgery at Memorial Hermann Hospital in Houston, Texas. Before surgery, Darwish had signed a document asking not to be resuscitated in the event of brain death. According to Ibrahim Muhawi, the poet, though suffering from serious heart problems, did not require urgent surgery, and the day set for the operation bore a symbolic resonance. In his Memory for Forgetfulness, Darwish centred the narrative of Israel's invasion of Lebanon and 88-day siege of Beirut on 6 August 1982, which was the anniversary of the atomic bombing of Hiroshima during World War II. A new bomb had been deployed, which could collapse and level a 12-storey building by creating a vacuum. Darwish wrote: "On this day, on the anniversary of the Hiroshima bomb, they are trying out the vacuum bomb on our flesh and the experiment is successful." By his choice of that day for surgery, Muwahi suggests, Darwish was documenting: "the nothingness he saw lying ahead for the Palestinian people."

Early reports of his death in the Arabic press indicated that Darwish had asked in his will to be buried in Palestine. Three locations were originally suggested; his home village of al-Birwa, the neighboring village Jadeida, where some of Darwish's family still resides, or in the West Bank city of Ramallah. Ramallah Mayor Janet Mikhail announced later that Darwish would be buried next to Ramallah's Palace of Culture, at the summit of a hill overlooking Jerusalem on the southwestern outskirts of Ramallah, and a shrine would be erected in his honor. Ahmed Darwish said "Mahmoud doesn't just belong to a family or a town, but to all the Palestinians, and he should be buried in a place, where all Palestinians can come and visit him."

Palestinian President Mahmoud Abbas declared three days of mourning to honor Darwish and he was accorded the equivalent of a State funeral. A set of four postage stamps commemorating Darwish was issued in August 2008 by the PA.

Arrangements for flying the body in from Texas delayed the funeral for a day. Darwish's body was then flown from Amman, Jordan for the burial in Ramallah. The first eulogy was delivered by Palestinian President Mahmoud Abbas to an orderly gathering of thousands. Several left-wing Knesset members attended the official ceremony; Mohammed Barakeh (Hadash) and Ahmed Tibi (United Arab List-Ta'al) stood with the family, and Dov Khenin (Hadash) and Jamal Zahalka (Balad) were in the hall at the Mukataa. Also present was the former French prime minister and poet Dominique de Villepin. After the ceremony, Darwish's coffin was taken in a cortege at walking pace from the Mukataa to the Palace of Culture, gathering thousands of followers along the way.

On 5 October 2008, the International Literature Festival Berlin held a worldwide reading in memory of Mahmoud Darwish.

== Views ==
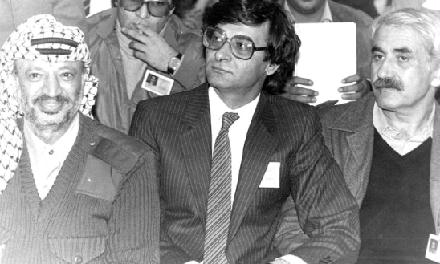
Yasser Arafat, Mahmoud Darwish & George Habash (pictured in 1980)

=== On the Israeli–Palestinian peace process ===
Darwish opposed the Oslo Accords.

Despite his criticism of both Israel and the Palestinian leadership, Darwish believed that peace was attainable. "I do not despair," he told the Israeli newspaper Haaretz. "I am patient and am waiting for a profound revolution in the consciousness of the Israelis. The Arabs are ready to accept a strong Israel with nuclear arms – all it has to do is open the gates of its fortress and make peace."

=== On antisemitism ===
Darwish rejected accusations of antisemitism: "The accusation is that I hate Jews. It's not comfortable that they show me as a devil and an enemy of Israel. I am not a lover of Israel, of course. I have no reason to be. But I don't hate Jews." Darwish described Hebrew as a "language of love." He considered himself to be part of the Jewish civilization that existed in Palestine and hoped for a reconciliation between the Palestinians and the Jews. When this happens, "the Jew will not be ashamed to find an Arab element in himself, and the Arab will not be ashamed to declare that he incorporates Jewish elements."

=== On the Fatah–Hamas conflict ===
In 2005, outdoor music and dance performances in Qalqiliya were suddenly banned by the Hamas-led municipality, with authorities saying that such events were forbidden by Islam. The municipality also prohibited the playing of music in the Qalqiliya zoo. In response, Darwish warned that "There are Taliban-type elements in our society, and this is a very dangerous sign."

In July 2007, Darwish visited Israel for the first time in over 35 years and spoke at an event sponsored by the Hadash coalition. In his speech, he expressed his dismay because Hamas had recently defeated Fatah in the Gaza civil war and taken complete control of the Gaza Strip: "We woke up from a coma to see a monocolored flag (of Hamas) do away with the four-color flag (of Palestine)." Additionally, he criticized the ongoing conflict between Hamas and Fatah as "a public attempt at suicide" and a barrier to Palestinian statehood: "Gaza won its independence from the West Bank. One people now have two states, two prisons."

== Legacy ==
=== In Palestinian society ===
Darwish is widely perceived as a Palestinian symbol and a spokesman for Palestinians. Darwish's work has won numerous awards and been published in 20 languages. A central theme in Darwish's poetry is the concept of watan or homeland. The poet Naomi Shihab Nye wrote that Darwish "is the essential breath of the Palestinian people, the eloquent witness of exile and belonging..." He has inspired the work of Libyan textile artist Nour Jaouda.

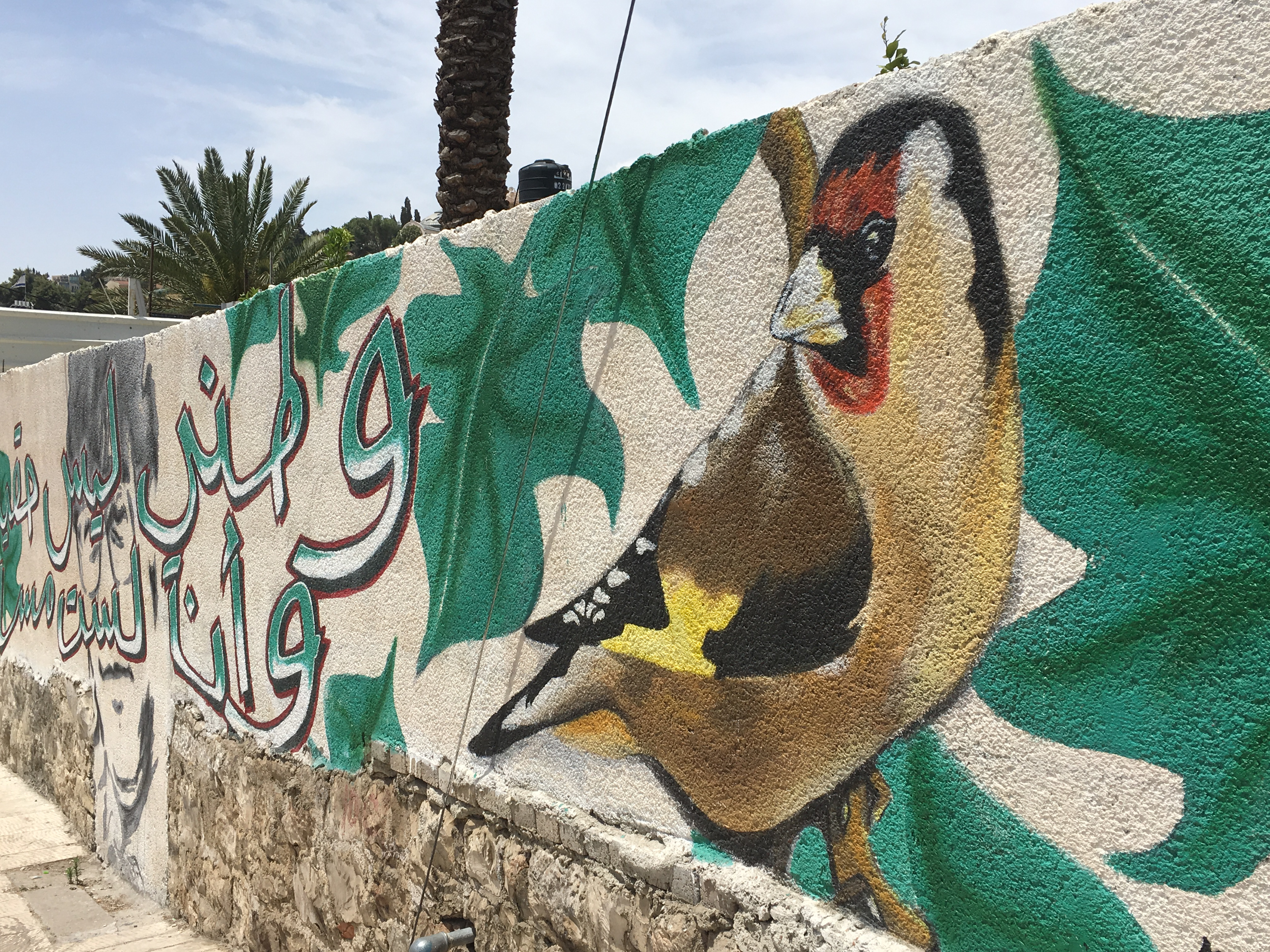
Part of the I Witness Silwan art installation includes the text "My homeland is not a suitcase and I am no traveler".

A line from Darwish's poem Diary of a Palestinian wound was incorporated into an art installation in Silwan in East Jerusalem. The installation, I Witness Silwan, was a collaboration between Art Forces, the Madaa-Silwan Creative Center, and the Wadi Hilwa Information Centre.

==== Mahmoud Darwish Award for Creativity (2008) ====
The Mahmoud Darwish Foundation was established on 4 October 2008 as a Palestinian non-profit foundation that "seeks to safeguard Mahmoud Darwish's cultural, literary and intellectual legacy." The foundation administers the annual Mahmoud Darwish Award for Creativity granted to intellectuals from Palestine and elsewhere.

South African poet and writer Breyten Breytenbach won the prize in 2010.

In 2017, Palestinian historian Maher Charif, Egyptian novelist and critic Salwa Bakr, and Indian novelist and activist Arundhati Roy were co-winners of the prize.

=== In Israeli society ===
==== "Those Who Pass Between Fleeting Words" controversy (1988) ====
In 1988, one of his poems, "Those Who Pass Between Fleeting Words", was angrily cited in the Knesset by Yitzhak Shamir. Written during the First Intifada, the poem includes the text: "Live anywhere but do not live among us... and do not die among us". It was interpreted by many Jewish Israelis as demanding that they leave the 1948 territories, although Darwish said that he meant the West Bank and Gaza. Adel Usta, a specialist on Darwish's poetry, said the poem had been misunderstood and mistranslated. Poet and translator Ammiel Alcalay wrote that "the hysterical overreaction to the poem simply serves as a remarkably accurate litmus test of the Israeli psyche ... (the poem) is an adamant refusal to accept the language of the occupation and the terms under which the land is defined."

==== On integration into Israel's school curriculum (2000) ====
In March 2000, Yossi Sarid, the Israeli education minister, proposed that two of Darwish's poems be included in the Israeli high school curriculum. Prime Minister Ehud Barak rejected the proposal on the grounds that the time "is not ripe" to teach Darwish in schools. It has been suggested that the incident had more to do with internal Israeli politics in trying to damage Prime Minister Ehud Barak's government than with poetry. With the death of Darwish, the debate about including his poetry in the Israeli school curriculum was re-opened in 2008.

"Although it is now technically possible for Jewish students to study Darwish, his writing is still banned from Arab schools. The curriculum used in Arab education is one agreed in 1981 by a committee whose sole Jewish member vetoed any works he thought might 'create an ill spirit'."

==== "Identity Card" contrversy (2016) ====
In July 2016 a controversy erupted over the broadcasting of Darwish's poem "Bitaqat hawiyya" ("Identity Card") on Israeli radio station Galei Tzahal. Written in 1964, it includes the lines: “Write down on the top of the first page: / I do not hate people / And I do not steal from anyone / But if I starve / I will eat my oppressor’s flesh / Beware, beware of my starving / And my rage."

Israeli defence minister Avigdor Lieberman condemned the broadcast in a statement, stating that "according to this same logic," the radio station could "glorify during a broadcast the literary marvels of Mein Kampf".

=== In the Arab world and Europe ===
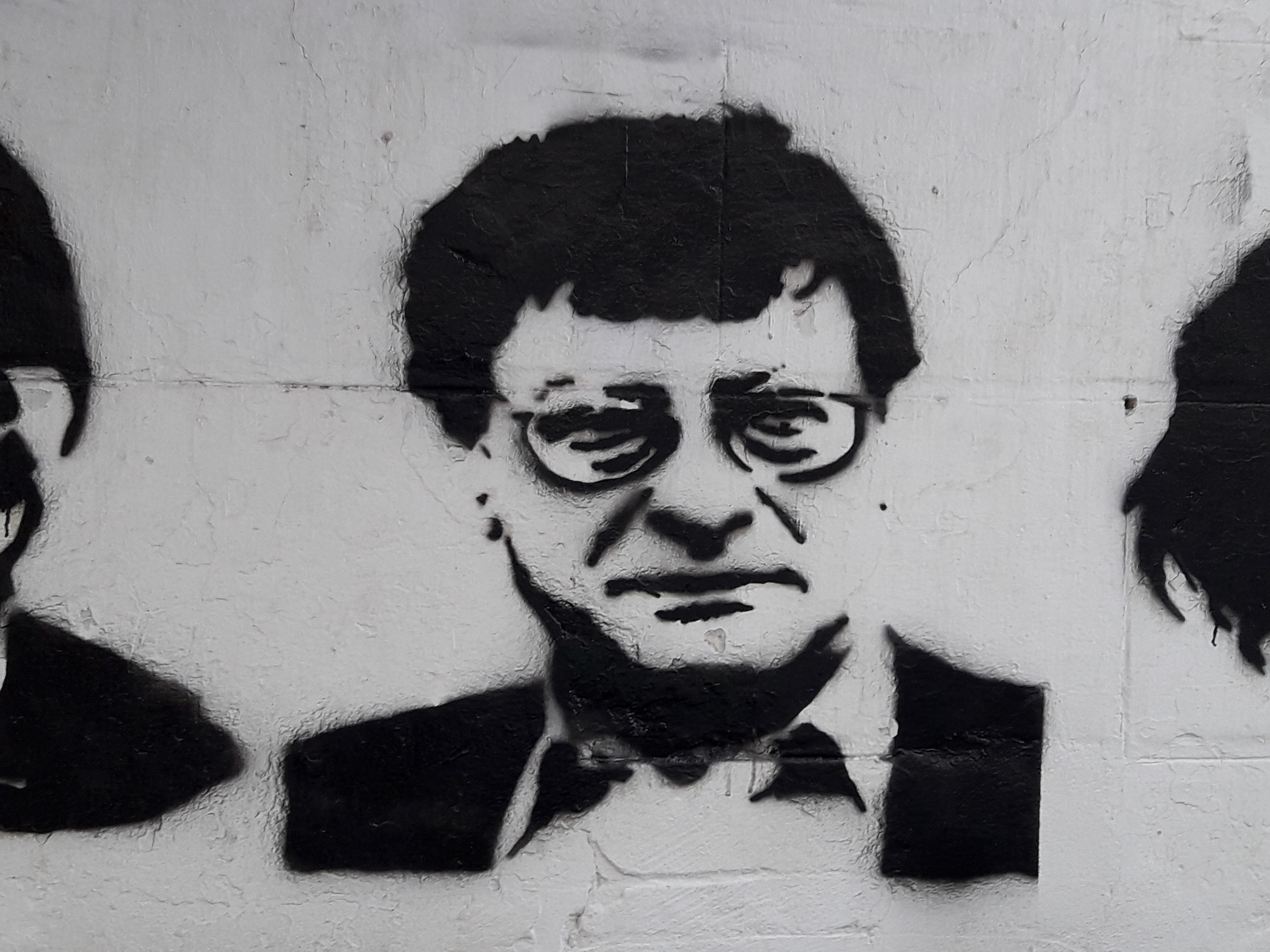
Mahmoud Darwish Portrait.

==== Poetry and musical productions ====
Many of Darwish's poems were set to music by Arab composers, among them Marcel Khalife, Reem Kelani, Majida El Roumi and Ahmad Qa'abour. The most notable are "Rita and the Rifle," "I lost a beautiful dream," "Birds of Galilee" and "I Yearn for my Mother's Bread." They have become anthems for at least two generations of Arabs. In the 1980s, Sabreen, a Palestinian music group in the 1948 territories, recorded an album including versions of Darwish's poems "On Man" and "On Wishes."

The composer Marcel Khalife was accused of blasphemy and insulting religious values, because of his song entitled "I am Yusuf, oh my father," which he based on Darwish's lyrics, and which cited a verse from the Qur'an. In this poem, Darwish shared the pain of Yusuf (Joseph), who was rejected by his brothers and fear him, because he is too handsome and kind. "Oh my father, I am Yusuf / Oh father, my brothers neither love me nor want me in their midst." Darwish presents the story of Joseph as an allegory for the rejection of the Palestinians by the Israelis.

In 1976, Egyptian-born Palestinian singer Zeinab Shaath adapted his poem "Identity Card" into an English-language song, titled "I Am An Arab," from her EP The Urgent Call of Palestine. The master copy was seized by Israeli forces during the 1982 invasion of Lebanon, but was recovered and re-issued in March 2024.

Israeli-American composer Tamar Muskal incorporated Darwish's "I Am From There" into her composition "The Yellow Wind," which combines a full orchestra, Arabic flute, Arabic and Israeli poetry, and themes from David Grossman's book The Yellow Wind.

In 2002, Swiss composer Klaus Huber completed a large work entitled "Die Seele muss vom Reittier steigen...", a chamber music concerto for cello, baritone and countertenor that incorporates Darwish's "The Soul Must Descend from its Mount and Walk on its Silken Feet."

In 2008, Mohammed Fairouz set selections from State of Siege to music. In his third symphony Poems and Prayers of 2012, in addition to the lyrics of Mahmoud Darwish, poems by the Arab poet Fadwa Touqan and the Israeli poet Yehuda Amichai are sounded.

In 2009 Egin, a patchanka band from Italy, published a song setting the poem "Identity Card" to music.

In 2011, the Syrian composer Hassan Taha created the musical play "The Dice Player", based on the poems and lyrics of Mahmoud Darwish. Their premiere took place at the experimental Center for Contemporary Music Gare du Nord in Basel, Switzerland.

In 2014, Finnish composer Kaija Saariaho set Darwish's poem "The Last Train Has Left" (from the collection Fewer Roses) within her work for baritone and orchestra True Fire, "a profound, important work" according to the L.A. Times.

Inspired by the attempted suppression of Khalife's composition "I am Yusuf, oh my father," the Norwegian singer-songwriter Moddi composed a fresh melody to the poem. The song is titled "Oh my father, I am Joseph," from his 2015 album Unsongs.

In 2016, his poem "We Were Without a Present" served as the basis for the central song, "Ya Reit" by Palestinian rapper Tamer Nafar in the film "Junction 48". Additionally, one of his poems was read as part of Nafar's speech during the Ophir Awards.

In 2017, his poem "Think of Others" was set to music by a South African artist and 11-year-old Palestinian youth activist, Janna Jihad Ayyad.

In 2017, British musician Roger Waters set to music an English translation of Darwish's "Lesson From the Kama Sutra (Wait for Her)" on his album Is This the Life We Really Want? in a song titled "Wait for Her."

==== Films and documentaries ====
In 1997, a documentary entitled Mahmoud Darwish was produced by French TV, directed by French-Moroccan director Simone Bitton.

Darwish appeared as himself in Jean-Luc Godard's Notre Musique (2004).

In 2008 Darwish starred in the five-screen film id – Identity of the Soul from Arts Alliance Productions, in which he narrates his poem "A Soldier Dreams of White Lilies" along with Ibsen's poem "Terje Vigen." Id was his final performance. It premiered in Palestine in October 2008, with audiences of tens of thousands. In 2010, the film was continuing an international screening tour.

In the Presence of Absence (2011), a Syrian television series directed by Najdat Anzour that tells the biography of Darwish

== Awards and honours ==
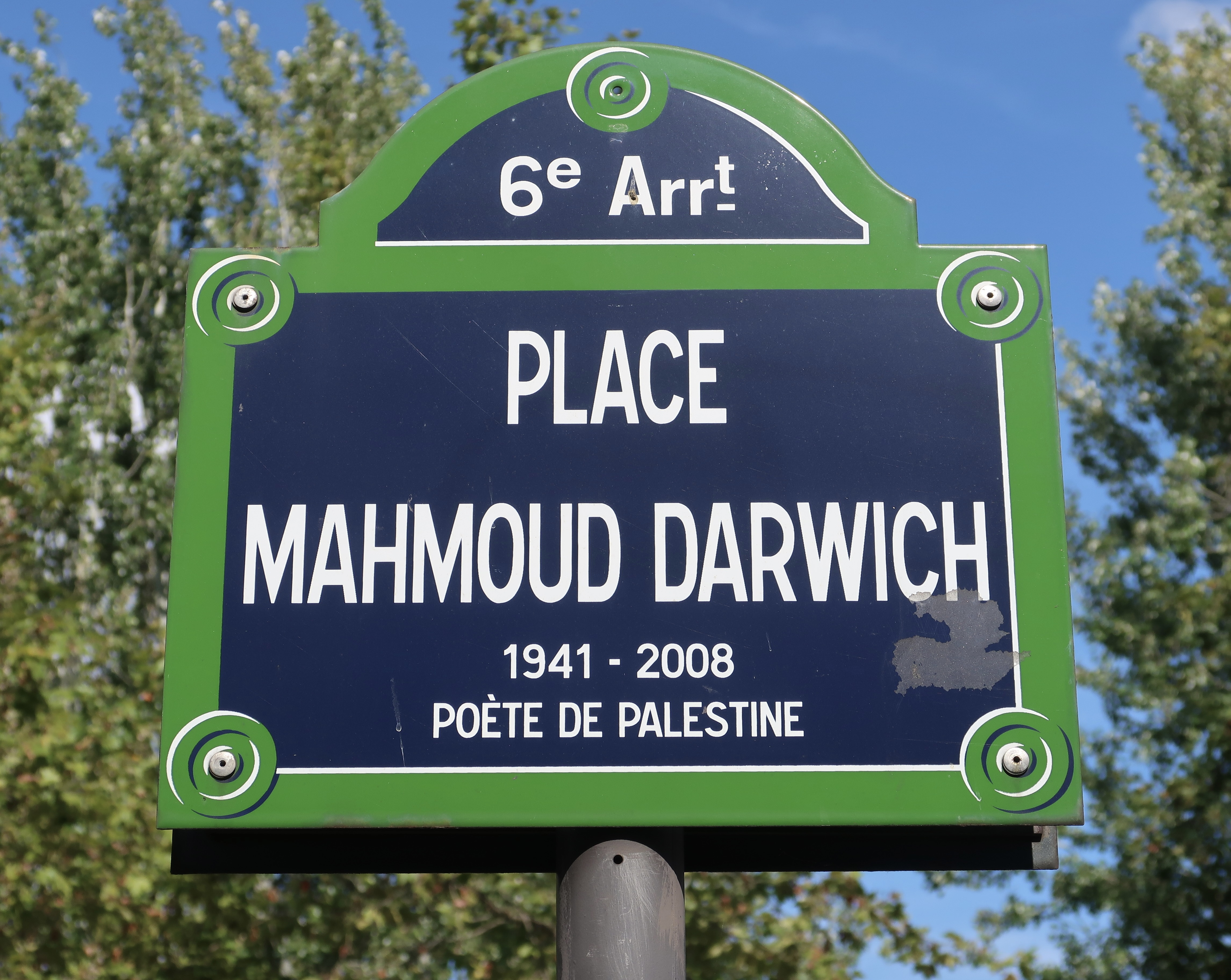
Place Mahmoud Darwich at Paris.

- Lotus Prize for Literature (1969; from the Afro-Asian Writers' Association)
- Lenin Peace Prize (1983; from the USSR)
- The Knight of the Order of Arts and Letters (1993; from France)
- Grand Cordon of the National Order of Merit of Tunisia (2000)
- The Lannan Foundation Prize for Cultural Freedom (2001)
- Al Owais Award (2002–2003)
- Prince Claus Awards (2004)
- "Bosnian stećak" (2007)
- Golden Wreath of Struga Poetry Evenings (2007)
- The International Forum for Arabic Poetry prize (2007)
- The Argana International Poetry Prize (2008; from Morocco)
- Grand Cordon of the Order of Civil Merit of the Syrian Arab Republic
- Commander of the National Order of Merit (Algeria)

== Published works ==
=== Poetry ===
- Asafir bila ajniha (Wingless birds), 1960
- Awraq Al-Zaytun (Leaves of olives), 1964
- Bitaqat huwiyya (Identity Card), 1964
- 'Asheeq min filasteen (A lover from Palestine), 1966
- Akhir al-layl (The end of the night), 1967
- Yawmiyyat jurh filastini (Diary of a Palestinian wound), 1969
- Habibati tanhad min nawmiha (My beloved awakens), 1969
- al-Kitabah 'ala dhaw'e al-bonduqiyah (Writing in the light of the gun), 1970
- al-'Asafir tamut fi al-jalil (Birds are Dying in Galilee), 1970
- Mahmoud Darwish works, 1971. Two volumes
- Mattar na'em fi kharif ba'eed (Light rain in a distant autumn) 1971
- Uhibbuki aw la uhibbuki (I love you, I love you not), 1972
- Jondiyyun yahlum bi-al-zanabiq al-baidaa' (A soldier dreaming of white lilies), 1973
- Complete Works, 1973. Now al-A'amal al-jadida (2004) and al-A'amal al-oula (2005).
- Muhawalah raqm 7 (Attempt number 7), 1974
- Tilka suratuha wa-hadha intihar al-ashiq (That's her image, and that's the suicide of her lover), 1975
- Ahmad al-za'tar, 1976
- A'ras (Weddings), 1977
- al-Nasheed al-jasadi (The bodily anthem), 1980. Joint work
- The Music of Human Flesh, Heinemann 1980, Poems of the Palestinian struggle selected and translated by Denys Johnson-Davies
- Qasidat Bayrut (Ode to Beirut), 1982
- Madih al-zill al-'ali (A eulogy for the tall shadow), 1983
- Hissar li-mada'eh al-bahr (A siege for the sea eulogies), 1984
- Victims of a Map, 1984. Joint work with Samih al-Qasim and Adonis in English.
- Hiya ughniyah, hiya ughniyah (It's a song, it's a song), 1985
- Sand and Other Poems, 1986
- Ward aqall (Fewer roses), 1986
- Ma'asat al-narjis, malhat al-fidda (Tragedy of daffodils, comedy of silver), 1989
- Ara ma oreed (I see what I want), 1990
- Ahad 'asher kaukaban (Eleven planets), 1992
- Limadha tarakt al-hissan wahidan (Why Did You Leave the Horse Alone?), 1995. English translation 2006 by Jeffrey Sacks (Archipelago Books) (ISBN 0-9763950-1-0)
- Psalms, 1995. A selection from Uhibbuki aw la uhibbuki, translation by Ben Bennani
- Sareer al-ghariba (Bed of a stranger), 1998
- Then Palestine, 1999 (with Larry Towell, photographer, and Rene Backmann)
- Jidariyya (Mural), 2000
- The Adam of Two Edens: Selected Poems, 2000 (Syracuse University Press and Jusoor) (edited by Munir Akash and Carolyn Forche)
- Halat Hissar (State of siege), 2002
- Unfortunately, It Was Paradise: Selected Poems, 2003. Translations by Munir Akash, Caroyln Forché and others
- La ta'tazer 'amma fa'alta (Don't apologize for what you did), 2004
- al-A'amal al-jadida (The new works), 2004. A selection of Darwish's recent works
- al-A'amal al-oula (The early works), 2005. Three volumes, a selection of Darwish's early works
- Ka-zahr el-lawz aw ab'ad (Almond blossoms and beyond), 2005
- The Butterfly's Burden, 2007 (Copper Canyon Press) (translation by Fady Joudah)

=== Prose ===
- Shai'on 'an al-wattan (Something about the homeland), 1971
- Youmiat muwaten bala watan (Diary of a Citizen without a Country), 1971, translated as The Palestinian Chalk Circle
- Wada'an ayatuha al-harb, wada'an ayuha al-salaam (Farewell, war, farewell, peace), 1974
- Yawmiyyat al-hozn al-'aadi (Journal of an ordinary grief), 1973. Turkish translation, 2009, by Hakan Özkan
- Dhakirah li-al-nisyan (Memory for Forgetfulness), 1987. English translation, 1995, by Ibrahim Muhawi
- Fi wasf halatina (Describing our condition), 1987
- al-Rasa'il (The Letters), 1990. Joint work with Samih al-Qasim
- Aabiroon fi kalamen 'aaber (Bypassers in bypassing words), 1991
- Fi hadrat al-ghiyab (In the presence of absence), 2006. English translation, 2011, by Sinan Antoon
- Athar alfarasha (A River Dies of Thirst: journals), 2009. English translation by Catherine Cobham

== See also ==
- Palestinian literature
- Arabic poetry
- Abd al-Karim al-Karmi
- Refaat Alareer
