= Salman Masalha =

Israeli Druze poet (born 1953)

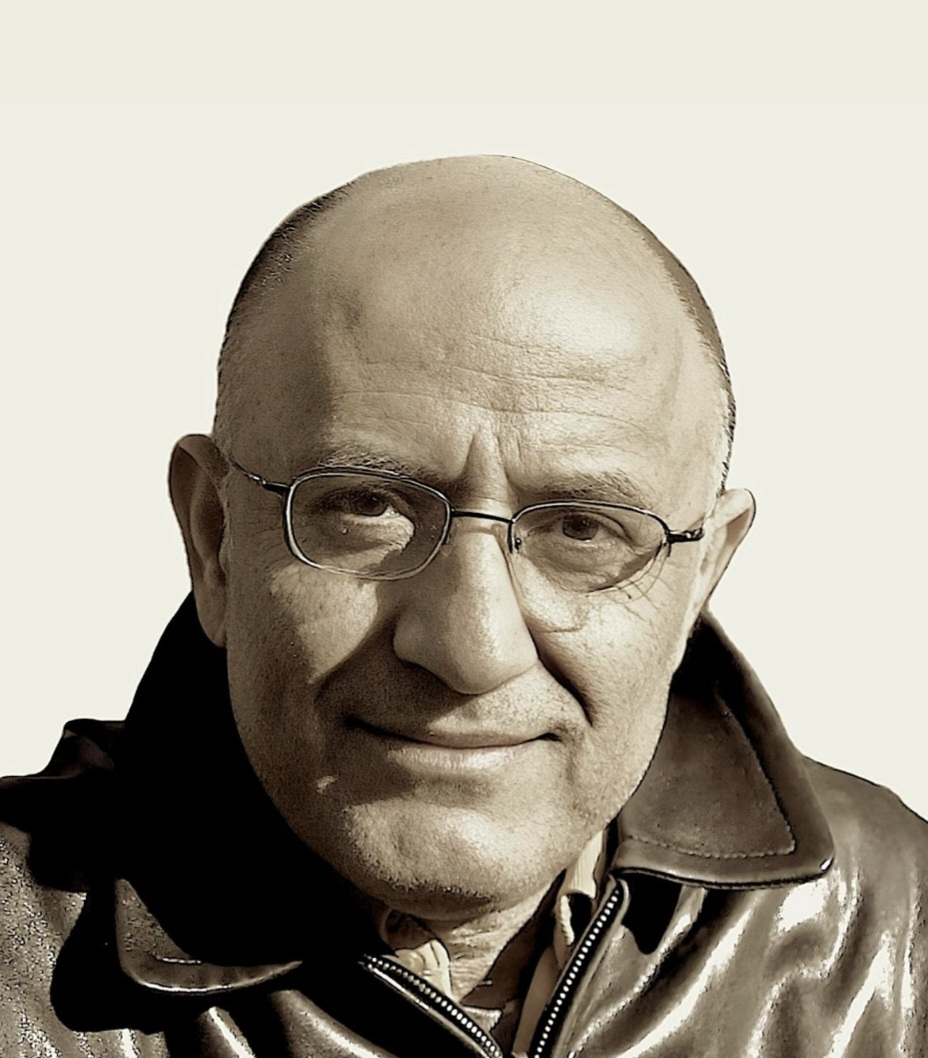

Salman Masalha (Arabic: سلمان مصالحة, Hebrew: סלמאן מצאלחה; born November 4, 1953) is an Arab-Israeli poet, writer, essayist and translator. Masalha is a bilingual writer who writes in Arabic and Hebrew, and publishes in both languages. His poetry has also appeared in other languages. Masalha is a frequent contributor to left-leaning Israeli newspaper Haaretz.

== Biography ==
Masalha was born on November 4, 1953, to a Druze family in Maghar, a village in the Galilee in northern Israel. After graduating from high school he moved to Jerusalem, where he has been living since 1972. Masalha studied at the Hebrew University of Jerusalem and holds a Ph.D. degree in Arabic literature. He wrote his thesis on the mythological elements of ancient Arabic poetry. He taught Arabic language and literature at the Hebrew University and served as co-editor of the Concordance of Early Arabic Poetry. One volume of the concordance titled Six Early Arab Poets: New Edition and Concordance was published in 1999.

== Writing career ==
Masalha is the author of eight volumes of poetry. Some of his Arabic and Hebrew poems have been performed to music and recorded by leading Israeli and Palestinian musicians, including Marwan Abado, Kamilya Jubran, Micha Shitrit, and Yair Dalal.

In 2006, Masalha was awarded the Israel's President's Prize for Literature for his collection of Hebrew poetry In Place.

After first declaring he intended to boycott the 2015 general election, he ultimately endorsed Meretz.

== Writing ==
=== Essays ===
- "The City of the Walking Flower". World Literature Today. Autumn 2021.
- "No light at the end of the tunnel". Haaretz. 19 January 2011. Archived from the original on 19 January 2011.
- "He made a homeland of words". Haaretz. 5 September 2008. Archived from the original on 18 September 2008.
- "The Apache War". Haaretz. 4 August 2006.
- "The Arab Man is the Problem". MEMRI. 28 October 2004.

=== Research ===
- Fahm al-Mantuq فهم المنطوق [Between the Lines] (PDF) (in Arabic). Elaph Library. 2010. Archived from the original (PDF) on 14 July 2011.
- Six Early Arab Poets, new edition and concordance, (co-author), Institute of Asian and African Studies at the Hebrew University of Jerusalem, The Max Schloessinger Memorial Series, Jerusalem 1999
- אספקטים מיתולוגיים בשירה הערבית הקדומה [Mythological Aspects in Ancient Arabic Poetry] (Ph.D thesis thesis). The Hebrew University of Jerusalem. 1998.

=== Poetry ===
- Ishq Mu'ajjal (Deferred Love, Arabic: عشق مؤجل), Raya Publishing House, Haifa 2016
- Fi al-Thara, Fi al-Hajar (In Dust, In Stone, Arabic: في الثرى، في الحجر), Raya Publishing House, Haifa 2013
- Lughat Umm (Mother Tongue, Arabic: لغة أم), Zaman Publications, Jerusalem 2006
- Ehad Mikan (In Place, Hebrew: אחד מכאן), Am Oved Publications, Tel Aviv 2004
- Khana Farigha, (Blank Space, Arabic: خانة فارغة), Zaman Publications, Jerusalem 2002.
- Rish al-Bahr (Sea Feathers, Arabic: ريش البحر), Zaman Publications, Jerusalem 1999
- Maqamat Sharqiyya (Oriental Scales, Arabic: مقامات شرقيّة), Jerusalem 1991
- Ka-l-'Ankabut bila Khuyut (Like a Spider without Webs, Arabic: كالعنكبوت بلا خيوط), Jerusalem 1989
- Maghnat Ta'ir al-Khuddar (Green Bird Song, Arabic: مغناة طائر الخضّر), al-Katib Publications, Jerusalem 1979

=== Op-Ed ===
- Israeli apartheid exposed at the airport, Haaretz, Jun. 5, 2014 (article screen-shot is reproduced at falkland-islands Tumblr).

=== Translations ===
Arabic into Hebrew

- Mahmoud Darwish, Memory for Forgetfulness, also known: Beirut Diary (Arabic: ذاكرة للنسيان, Hebrew: זכר לשכחה), with commentary and epilogue, Schocken Publications, Tel Aviv 1989
- Sahar Khalifah, Wild Thorns (Arabic: الصبّار, Hebrew: הצבר), Galileo Publications, Jerusalem 1978

Hebrew into Arabic

- Efraim Sidon, Uzu and Muzu (Hebrew: אוזו ומוזו מכפר קאקרוזו, Arabic: أوزو وموزو من كفر كاكاروزو), Nazareth 2000
- Jerusalem, Historical Studies (Arabic: القدس، دراسات في تاريخ المدينة), ed. Amnon Cohen, Yad Izhak Ben-Zvi Publications, Jerusalem 1990
- Dror Green, The Intifadah Tales (Hebrew: אגדות האינתפאדה, Arabic: حكايا الانتفاضة), Jerusalem 1989
- Haim Gouri, "Selected Poems, with an Introduction" (Arabic: خلخال ينتظر الكاحل), Masharef, No. 30, pp 204–231, 2007
- Aharon Shabtai, "Schizophrenic Homeland" (Arabic: شيزوفرينيا الوطن), selected poems with an introduction, Masharef, No. 23, pp 94–118, 2004
- Agi Mishol, "Selected Poems", Masharef, No. 17, pp 159–169, 2002

English into Arabic

- Breyten Breytenbach, "selected poems", Masharef, No. 15, Haifa-Jerusalem, pp. 7–18 (1997)
- Wislawa Szymborska, "selected poems", Masharef, No. 13, Haifa-Jerusalem, pp. 82–96 (1997)
- Seamus Heaney, "selected poems", Masharef, No. 5, Haifa-Jerusalem, pp. 111–116, 1995

=== Editing ===
- Biblical Stories in Islamic Paintings (Arabic: قصص التّوراة في الرسومات الإسلامية), Israel Museum 1992
