= Torstein Blixfjord =

Norwegian artist

Torstein Blixfjord is a Norwegian artist who works with film, performance, poetry and photography. He began directing theatre in 1990 with a series of adaptations of plays by Strindberg and Ibsen, to whose work Blixfjord has often returned. Following these productions, he went on to work with multimedia, and later to direct film in 2000. He is best known as a film director and producer.

== As Film Director ==
2014	Darwish: A Soldier Dreams Of White Lilies, a final performance by Mahmoud Darwish
2012	Bird in a Box
2009	id - Identity of the Soul at the Museum of Islamic Art in Qatar
2008	Christmas Eve, a film based on Henrik Wergeland's poem of the same name for the opening of the Wergeland Year

== Multimedia Work ==
2008	id - Identity of the Soul on a 9 date tour of the West Bank
2006	Terje in Yokohama, Japan
2000	Fisk at Grimstad Shortfilm Festival with Paal Schjerven and Olav Celius
1999	Fountain House Blues at Fountain House, New York City, with images by Charlie Gross and music by Briggan Krauss
1996	Telefonterroristen - Radiodrama
1994	Shalom-Salaam Peace Concert in Oslo Spektrum
1994	Terje Vigen by Henrik Ibsen at the National Theatre (Director of Multimedia)

== As Theatre Director ==
1993	The Evangelic Poets at the Agder Theatre
1992	Easter by August Strindberg at the Black Box Theatre
1991	The Wild Duck by Henrik Ibsen at Northwestern University Theatre
1991	The Vikings at Helgeland by Henrik Ibsen at Tyrili Teatret, Oslo
1990	Mother Love by August Strindberg at Northwestern University Theatre

== Producer ==
In 2012 Blixfjord produced Jorgen Friband's feature documentary Shakespeare: The Hidden Truth, which premiered in Norway on 14 April 2012, and will be released in the UK later this year.

In 2004 Blixfjord was Executive Producer of Brixton Stories- a series of short films that featured the London borough of Brixton. Brixton Stories was produced by Arts Alliance and Insight News Television.
