= PlanetAll =

Defunct social networking site

- Company type: Private
- Industry: internet
- Founded: November 1996
- Defunct: July 2, 2000
- Headquarters: Cambridge, Massachusetts, USA, Cambridge, MA
- Key people: Warren Adams and Brian Robertson
- Products: social networking
- Website: www.planetall.com

PlanetAll was a social networking, calendaring, and address book site launched in November 1996. It was founded by a group of Harvard Business School and MIT graduates including Warren Adams and Brian Robertson. Their company, Sage Enterprises, was based in Cambridge, Massachusetts and was the winner of the 1996 New Business of the Year Award from the Cambridge Chamber of Commerce.

== Background ==
PlanetAll was possibly the first social networking site on the Internet. The site had more than 100,000 groups, organized around real-world counterparts such as academic institutions and employers. When the user entered the name of his or her university, the service would list the user's classmates who were also members of the service. Users could exchange authorization to access each other's contacts. Many sites at the time offered web-based address books and calendars, but PlanetAll.com combined the two: when a user entered travel plans into the calendar, the service would cross-reference the destination with the address book, as well as the user's contacts' travel plans; the site would then notify users when they would cross paths with their contacts.

On August 4, 1998, Amazon.com announced that it had agreed to acquire PlanetAll. Under terms of the agreement, Amazon.com acquired 100 percent of PlanetAll in exchange for 800,000 shares. Amazon.com founder and CEO Jeff Bezos said, "PlanetAll is the most innovative use of the Internet I've seen. It's simply a breakthrough in doing something as fundamental and important as staying in touch. The reason PlanetAll has over 1.5 million members—and is growing even faster than the Internet—is simple: it creates extraordinary value for its users. I believe PlanetAll will prove to be one of the most important online applications."

Less than two years later, Amazon.com shut down PlanetAll.com. On July 2, 2000, they told PlanetAll members, "We are pleased to announce that we have completed the integration of the key e-commerce related features of PlanetAll.com into our main site at Amazon.com ... Although PlanetAll.com will be going away, you'll still be able to enjoy some of the tools that help you keep in touch with like-minded folks."

Amazon's "Purchase Circles" feature was based on PlanetAll, and some of PlanetAll code was used to improve Amazon's Friends and Favorites area. The only calendar feature that appears to have remained, however, is the date reminder. Amazon spokeswoman Patty Smith said after Amazon had absorbed the technology, it did not see the need to maintain PlanetAll. "It seemed really superfluous to have it running beside Friends and Favorites," she said.

Many of the 1.5 million members were upset by the loss of the utility; one internet journalist wrote later that year that she was "in mourning" for the service.

== Social Networking Patent ==
On June 15, 2010, the United States Patent and Trademark Office awarded Amazon.com a patent for "Social Networking System" based on its ownership of PlanetAll. The patent describes a Social Networking System as

A networked computer system provides various services for assisting users in locating, and establishing contact relationships with, other users. For example, in one embodiment, users can identify other users based on their affiliations with particular schools or other organizations. The system also provides a mechanism for a user to selectively establish contact relationships or connections with other users, and to grant permissions for such other users to view personal information of the user. The system may also include features for enabling users to identify contacts of their respective contacts. In addition, the system may automatically notify users of personal information updates made by their respective contacts.

The patent has garnered attention due to its similarity to the initial features of popular social networking site Facebook.

== See also ==
- Facebook
- MySpace
- LinkedIn

== Co-branded sites ==
- InfoSpace
- GeoCities
- Monster (website)
