= Anne Grete Preus =

Norwegian rock singer (1957–2019)

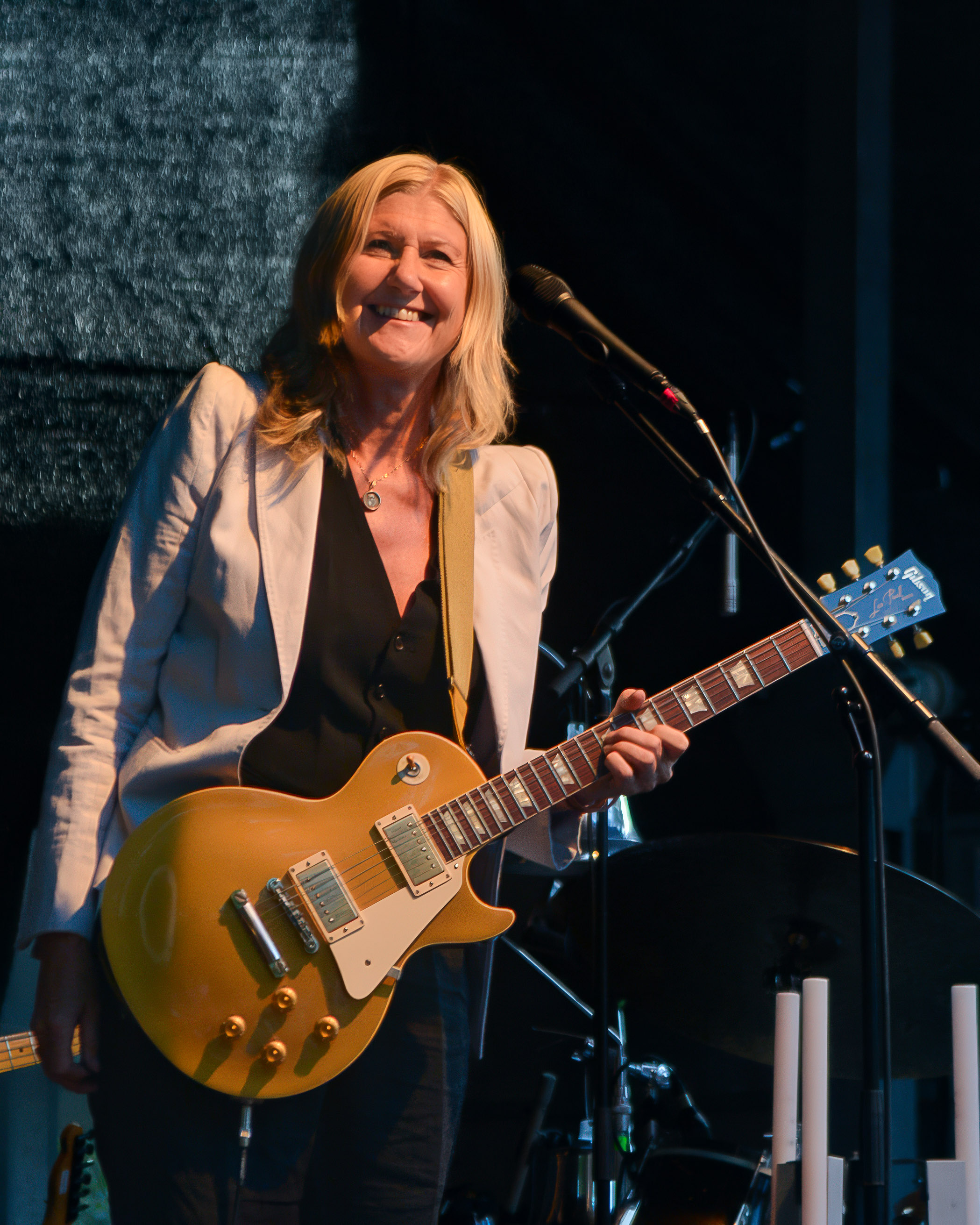
- Anne Grete Preus performs in July 2014

Background information
- Born: 22 May 1957; Haugesund, Norway
- Died: 25 August 2019 (aged 62)
- Occupation: Singer
- Instruments: Vocals, guitar, bass guitar, keyboards, piano, harmonica, mandolin, Hammond organ, dobro

Anne Grete Preus (22 May 1957 – 25 August 2019) was a Norwegian rock singer in Norway in the 1980s and 1990s, first as member of the bands Veslefrikk and Can Can and later as a solo act. She released nine solo albums and won the Spellemannprisen multiple times. In 2008 she appeared as a narrator in an Arts Alliance production, id - Identity of the Soul. She contracted liver cancer in 2007. In early 2019 she had to cancel the planned concerts for the summer due to illness.

== Awards and honors ==
- Gammleng Award i åpen klasse i 1992
- Kardemommestipendiet i 1992
- Spellemannprisen 1994 i klassene kvinnelig artist for Millimeter
- Spellemannprisen 1994 i klassen årets album for Millimeter
- Spellemannprisen 1994 i klassen årets hit for Millimeter
- Tekstforfatterfondets ærespris i 2006
- Norsk Artistforbund Ærespris i 2007
- Prøysenprisene i 2007
- Edvardprisen i klassen populærmusikk for albumet Om igjen for første gang

== Bibliography ==
- Stråets lengde. Skisser fra et liv ["the length of the straw. Sketches from a life"] (2020, posthumous). The collection of texts by Preus, was written with an autobiography in mind, according to media.

== Discography ==
- 1984: Snart 17 (Transmission)
- 1988: Fullmåne (Warner)
- 1989: Lav Sol! Høy Himmel (Warner)
- 1991: Og Høsten Kommer Tidsnok (Warner)
- 1994: Millimeter (Warner)
- 1994: Anne Grete Preus (Warner)
- 1996: Millimeter (Warner)
- 1996: Vrimmel (Warner)
- 1999: Verden Er Et Vakkert Sted (Virgin Music)
- 2001: Alfabet (Warner)
- 2004: Når Dagen Roper (Worner)
- 2007: Om Igjen For Første Gang (Warner)
- 2009: Nesten Alene (Warner)
- 2013: Et Sted Å Feste Blikket (Warner)

Awards
Preceded by Sidsel Endresen	Recipient of the Open class Gammleng-prisen; 1992	Succeeded by Mari Boine
Preceded by No Female artist award	Recipient of the Female artist Spellemannprisen; 1994	Succeeded by Lynni Treekrem
Preceded by No This year's song award	Recipient of the Spellemannprisen for This year's song 1994	Succeeded by Morten Harket & Håvard Rem
Preceded by No This year's album award	Recipient of the Spellemannprisen for This year's album 1994	Succeeded by Morten Harket
