= Terje Vigen =

1862 poem written by Henrik Ibsen

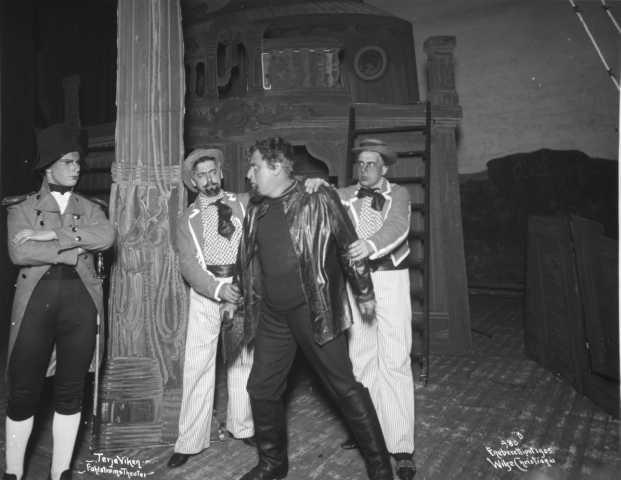
A scene from Terje Vigen being played out at Fahlstrøms Theater in 1905 - Terje being captured.

Terje Vigen is a poem written by Norwegian writer Henrik Ibsen and published in 1862. It follows the life of Terje Vigen, a fictional Norwegian man who lives in the town of Grimstad, during the early 19th century. During the Gunboat War, Grimstad is under a British naval blockade, and Vigen decides to travel to Denmark to acquire essential goods for his family in a small rowboat in 1809. However, his boat is captured by a Royal Navy corvette, and Vigen is sent as a prisoner of war to England, where he remains until the war is over. Returning to Grimstad in a Swedish Navy frigate in 1814, Vigen discovers that his wife and daughter have died. Becoming a maritime pilot, years later Vigen rescues a yacht in distress. He discovers that the yacht's captain was the commander of the corvette who took him prisoner, but decides against vengeance and rescues the Englishman along with his wife and child.

== Inspiration ==
In Grimstad, Henrik Ibsen was inspired by the stories of Norwegian maritime pilots. He became a close friend to one of the oldest and most experienced pilots, who had lived a remarkable life and had exciting stories to tell the young writer. His name was Svend Hanssen Haaø, from the island of Haaø (in modern Norwegian Håøya). The story of his life is often thought to be an important source for Ibsen when he wrote his famous poem Terje Vigen. See article "Who was Terje Vigen?"

Haaø's life contains many of the essential elements of the story of Terje Vigen. He made several trips by rowboat to Denmark past the British blockade of Norway between 1807 and 1814 to transport essential goods back to his family and associates in Grimstad. British ships captured him as many as four times, and some of his crewmates were taken to Britain as prisoners of war. It is well documented that Henrik Ibsen and Haaø became close friends. They made a lot of visits to each other, both at Svend’s house at the Haaø Island, and in Ibsen’s department at Grimstad Pharmacy.

Henrik Ibsen never revealed if he had a model when he wrote the story of Terje Vigen. However, the most important specialists on Henrik Ibsen’s life in Grimstad, were convinced that Ibsen’s friendship with Svend and Svend’s remarkable life as a pilot at the coast was the most important inspiration for Ibsen. Ibsen painted Svend sitting at Haaø Island. The painting is called The Pilot from Haaø Island. This painting is placed in Ibsen's house in Grimstad, and is owned by Grimstad Museum.

== Reception ==
In his biography of Ibsen, Edmund Gosse indicates:

"He was perhaps momentarily saved by the publication of Terje Vigen, which enjoyed a solid popularity. This is the principal and, indeed, almost the only instance in Ibsen's works of what the Northern critics call "epic," but what we less ambitiously know as the tale in verse. Terje Vigen will never be translated successfully into English, for it is written, with brilliant lightness and skill, in an adaptation of the Norwegian ballad-measure which it is impossible to reproduce with felicity in our language."

"Among Ibsen's writings Terje Vigen is unique as a piece of pure sentimentality carried right through without one divagation into irony or pungency. It is the story of a much-injured and revengeful Norse pilot, who, having the chance to drown his old enemies, Milord and Milady, saves them at the mute appeal of their blue-eyed English baby. Terje Vigen is a masterpiece of what we may define as the "dash-away-a-manly- tear" class of narrative. It is extremely well written and picturesque, but the wonder is that, of all people in the world, Ibsen should have written it."

The poem and the character of Terje Vigen has become a core icon of Norwegian coastal culture and a sense of a national identity. Every year the poem is read at festivals and included in dance and music performances. Best known are the wood boat festival at Risør and the Ibsen festival in Grimstad. Norwegian Broadcasting Corporation, NRK, broadcasts on the radio a reading of Terje Vigen on New Year's Eve at midnight.

== Notable adaptations ==
In 1917, Victor Sjöström directed an eponymous Swedish film based on the poem, retitled A Man There Was in English-speaking territories. A German remake of 1933, Das Meer ruft aka The Lake Calls, starred Heinrich George and was set on a fictional Baltic island under Russian occupation during the First World War.

The Norwegian composer Guttorm Guttormsen wrote his Terje Vigen for bass soloist and orchestra in 1977. In 1994/5, Jon Mostad wrote music for Terje Vigen for recitation, choir (SSA) and symphonic wind band.

Film maker Torstein Blixfjord directed a major multimedia adaptation in Yokohama, Japan in November 2006. The production involved a film projected across five cinema screens set up on Shinko Pier, which was accompanied by dancers. The film featured the poem narrated by Masato Ibu. The project formed the basis of Blixfjord's 2008/9 project Id - Identity of the Soul, which also featured contributions from the great Palestinian poet Mahmoud Darwish.

Also in 2006, composer and producer Kjell-Ole Haune developed Terje Vigen into a multimedia musical. This production went on tour in Norway and USA in 2006 and 2007 and was staged in London's West End in 2008.
