= Siege of Beirut =

Israeli military siege during the 1982 Lebanon War

Coordinates: 33.8897°N 35.5003°E

- Part of the 1982 Lebanon War and the Lebanese Civil War
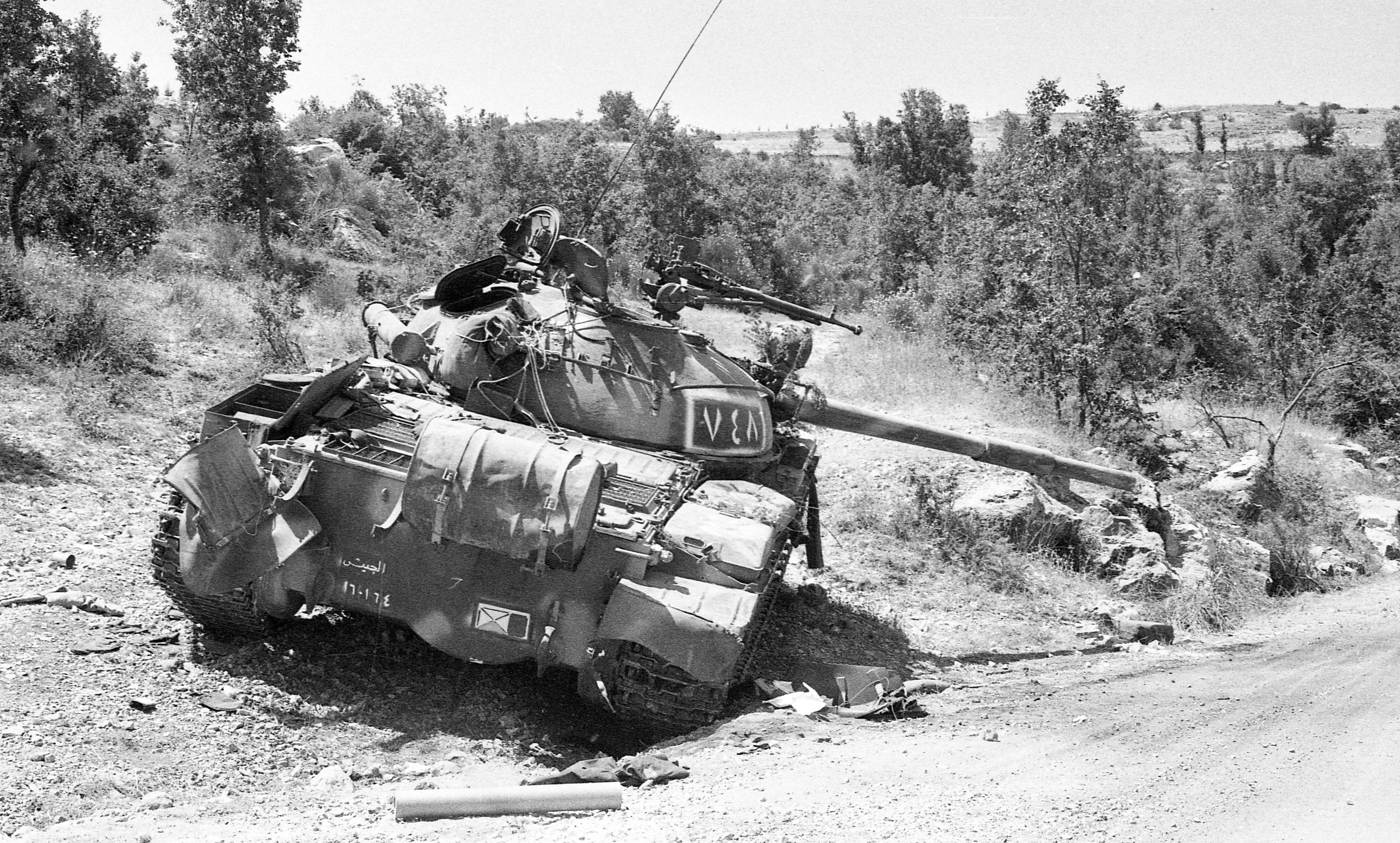
- Syrian T-62 tank destroyed by the IDF in Beirut area, 1982
Date	14 June – 21 August 1982
Location	West Beirut, Lebanon
Result	Israeli victory: Palestinian militants evacuated after peace settlement; Destruction of much of Beirut

Belligerents
Israel; SLA	PLO (Ba'athist Syria) Syria; LNRF: LCP; SSNP; ASBP; CAOL; INM; ASALA; PKK

Commanders and leaders
Menachem Begin; Ariel Sharon; Rafael Eitan; Saad Haddad	Yasser Arafat; Saad Sayel; Abu Jihad; Salah Khalaf; George Habash; Abu Khalid; Nayef Hawatmeh; Hafez al-Assad; Mustafa Tlass; Hikmat al-Shihabi; George Hawi; Elias Atallah; Inaam Raad; Assem Qanso; Mohsen Ibrahim; Ibrahim Kulaylat; Monte Melkonian; Mahsum Korkmaz

Strength
76,000	12,000

Casualties and losses
Unknown	Unknown
- 4,000–5,000 Lebanese civilians killed

During the 1982 Lebanon War, the city of Beirut was besieged by Israel following the breakdown of the ceasefire that had been imposed by the United Nations amidst the Lebanese Civil War. Beginning in mid-June, the two-month-long siege resulted in thousands of civilian deaths and the expulsion of the Palestine Liberation Organization (PLO) from Beirut and the rest of Lebanon.

== Background ==
=== PLO's expulsion from Jordan and relocation to Lebanon ===
The PLO moved its primary base of operations to Beirut in the early 1970s, after Black September in Jordan. The presence of Palestinian forces was one of the main reasons that led to a conflict in Lebanon in 1975–1976 which ended with the occupation of Lebanon by peacekeeping forces (the United Nations Interim Force in Lebanon). Over the next few years, the Syrians and the PLO gained power in Lebanon, surpassing the ability of the official Lebanese government to curtail or control their actions. Throughout this time, artillery and rocket attacks were launched against Israel. Israel bombed targets in Lebanon and in 1978 launched a military invasion into Southern Lebanon codenamed "Operation Litani".

=== Israel in Lebanon and the United Nations ceasefire ===
In 1978, and again in 1981 and early 1982, the United Nations sponsored a ceasefire, and Israeli troops were withdrawn. In 1982 Israel re-invaded Lebanon following the attempted assassination of its ambassador in London, despite being aware that the attack had been carried out by the Abu Nidal faction, which was at war with Yasser Arafat's PLO. The architect of the war, Ariel Sharon (then Defense Minister), presented it to the Israeli government as a limited incursion into Southern Lebanon but took his troops to Beirut. The invasion was code-named "Operation Pines" or "Peace for Galilee", and was intended to weaken or evict the PLO and impose Bachir Gemayel, head of the Christian Phalange party, as President of Lebanon in order to get Lebanon to sign a peace treaty with Israel and bring the country into Israel's sphere of influence. This plan failed when Gemayel was assassinated not long after being elected President by the Lebanese parliament under Israeli pressure.

=== Israeli assault on the PLO and Syrian troops ===
The Israeli forces invaded in a three-pronged attack. One group moved along the coastal road to Beirut, another aimed at cutting the main Beirut-Damascus road, and the third moved up along the Lebanon-Syria border, hoping to block Syrian reinforcements or interference. By the 11th of June, Israel had gained air superiority after shooting down a number of Syrian aircraft; Syria called for a cease-fire, and the majority of PLO guerrillas fled Tyre, Sidon, and other areas for Beirut.

== Siege ==
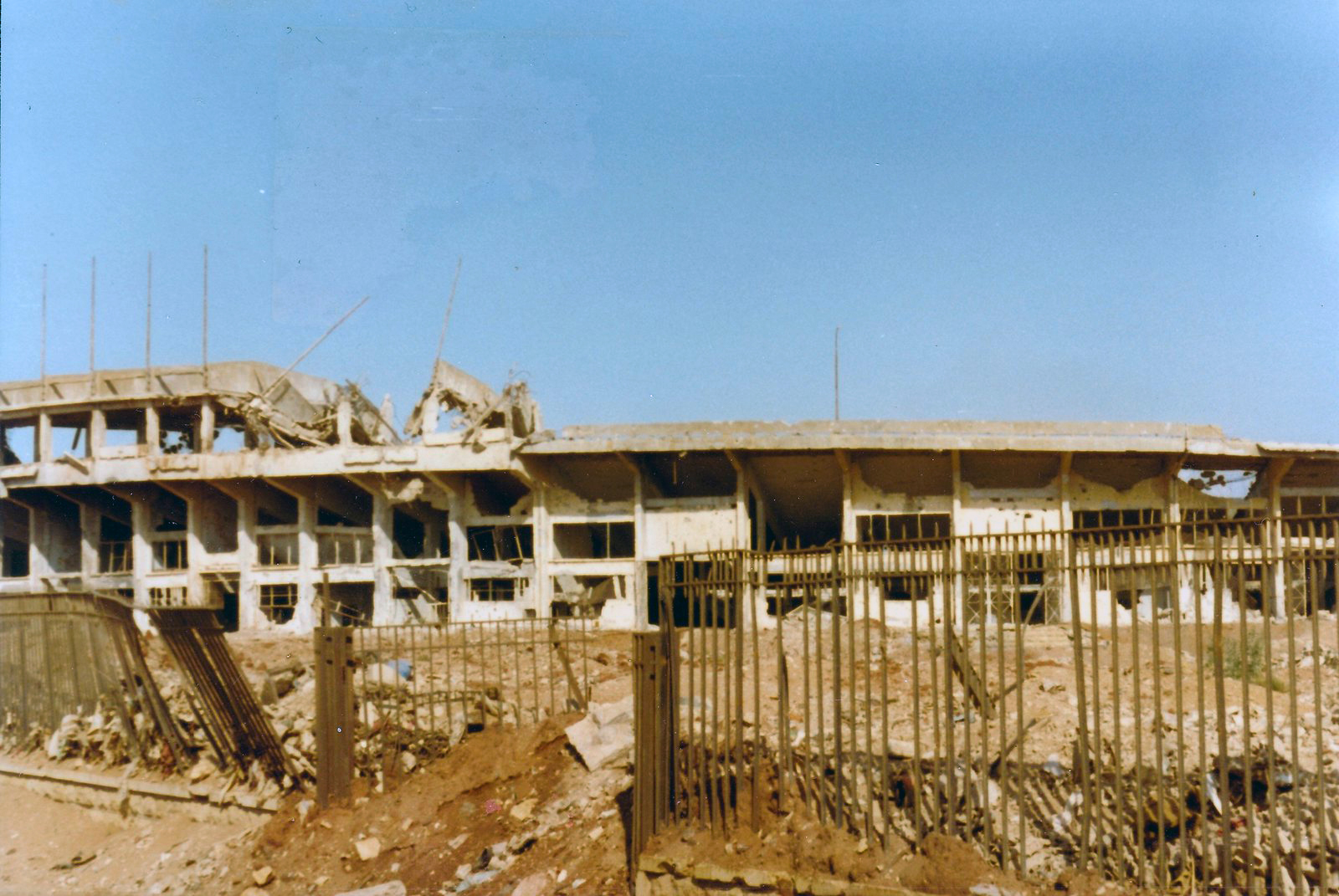
Camille Chamoun Stadium in 1982 after being bombed

=== Peace negotiations by the United States ===
The ring around Beirut was closed by 13 June 1982, 7 days after the start of Israeli invasion to Lebanon. PLO and part of Syrian forces were isolated in the city.

Israel hoped to complete the siege as quickly as possible; their goal all along in invading Lebanon was for a quick and decisive victory. In addition, the United States, through their representative Philip Habib, was pushing for peace negotiations; the longer the siege took, the greater Arafat's bargaining power would be.

=== Role of Lebanese Christian militias ===
At first Israelis thought that Maronite forces would eradicate the PLO quasi-government in Beirut, but it turned out that the Maronites were not prepared to undertake this task. For the IDF, the capture of Beirut in street-to-street fighting would have involved unacceptable level of casualties. This is why the method chosen, was the combination of military pressure and psychological warfare to persuade the PLO that the only alternative to surrender was total annihilation.

=== Israeli attacks on Palestinian leaders ===
For seven weeks, Israel attacked the city by sea, air, and land, cutting off food and water supplies, disconnecting the electricity, and securing the airport and some southern suburbs, but for the most part coming no closer to their goals. As with most sieges, thousands of civilians in the city were killed alongside PLO guerrillas. Israel was roundly accused of indiscriminately shelling the city in addition to the other measures taken to weaken the PLO. By the end of the first week of July 500 buildings had been destroyed by Israeli shells and bombs.

On 14 July, Sharon and chief of staff Rafael Eitan obtained Prime Minister Begin's support for a large scale operation to conquer West Beirut in order to achieve the eviction of the PLO. But the plan was rejected on 16 July by the full Israeli cabinet, out of concern for heavy loss of life. Some parties threatened to leave the ruling coalition if the plan was adopted.

At the end of July, with negotiations still deadlocked and a 27 day lull in fighting, the IDF intensified its attacks. Mossad, using their Phalangist contacts, sent Arab agents into Beirut with car bombs in order to terrorize the Palestinians into submission and the Lebanese to increase pressure for their departure. Dozens of people were killed in these bombings. Some of the Israeli agents were caught and ultimately confessed.

The Israeli Air Force intensified missions specifically designed to assassinate Palestinian leaders – Yassir Arafat, Abu Jihad and Salah Khalaf (Abu Iyad). The Israelis were assisted by agents with transmitters on the ground. Although a number of apartment houses were destroyed with hundreds of Palestinians and Lebanese killed or wounded, the leaders managed to evade bombings.

=== American-brokered peace agreement ===
On 10 August, when American envoy Philip Habib submitted a draft agreement to Israel, Sharon, probably impatient with what he regarded as American meddling, ordered a carpet bombing of Beirut, during which at least 300 people were killed. That bombing was followed by a protest to the Israeli government by President Ronald Reagan. Within 20 minutes of a phone call between Reagan and Begin, in which the former said the bombings were going too far and needed to stop, Begin ordered the bombings stopped. On 12 August, the Israeli cabinet stripped Ariel Sharon of most of his powers; he was not allowed to order the use of air force, armored force and artillery without agreement of the cabinet or prime minister.

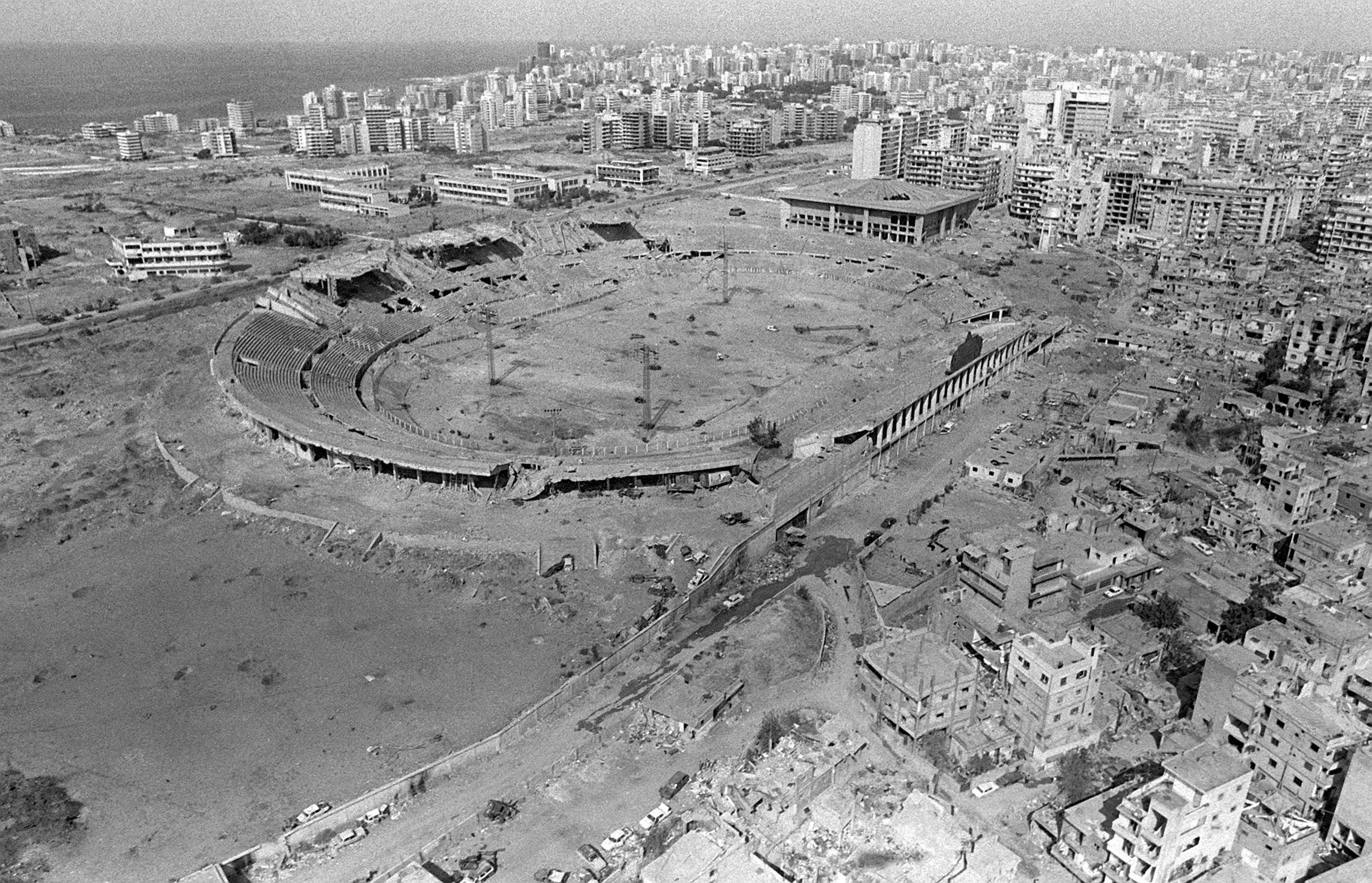
Aerial view of the Camille Chamoun Sports City Stadium, used by the Palestinians as an ammunition depot amidst armed confrontations with the Israelis

During the siege, the Israelis secured several key locations in other parts of Lebanon, but did not manage to take the city before a peace agreement was finally implemented. Although Syria had agreed on 7 August, Israel, Lebanon, and the PLO finally agreed, with US mediation, on the 18th. On 21 August, 350 French paratroopers arrived in Beirut, followed by 800 US Marines and Italian Bersaglieri plus additional international peacekeepers (for a total force of 2,130) to supervise the removal of the PLO, first by ship and then overland, to Tunisia, Yemen, Jordan, and Syria. Altogether 8,500 PLO men were evacuated to Tunisia, and 2,500 by land to other Arab countries.

== Results ==
In the end, Israel succeeded in ending the rocket attacks for a very short period, and routed the PLO from Lebanon. The siege also saw the insubordination and subsequent dismissal of the 211th Armor Brigade commander, Eli Geva, who refused to lead his forces into the city, arguing this would result in "the excessive killings of civilians."

The conclusion to the conflict has been portrayed by analyst Jonathan F. Keiler as a tactical victory for Israel, but a strategic victory for the PLO.

== International reaction ==
- United States: The siege was condemned by Israel's traditional close ally, the United States, who warned Israel that weaponry provided by the United States was only to be used for defensive purposes. The U.S. government at one point even considered threatening sanctions against Israel in order to stop Israel from launching an assault on West Beirut in August 1982. It was reported by the Ottawa Citizen (originally from a New York Times interview) that during one of two phone conversations on 12 August between US president Ronald Reagan and Israeli Prime Minister Menachem Begin, Reagan angrily described the bombing of West Beirut as a "holocaust".
- Israel: While Prime Minister Begin did not deny that civilians were hurt, and he reportedly expressed regrets over the loss of innocent life, he stressed that their deaths were "...not the Israelis' fault".
- Soviet Union: The Soviet Union tried to pass a United Nations resolution calling for a worldwide arms embargo on Israel, which was vetoed by the U.S.

== Aftermath ==
=== Sabra and Shatila massacre ===
Bachir Gemayel, the Lebanese president-elect, was killed in Eastern Beirut a few weeks after the withdrawal of PLO forces. His death resulted in the Lebanese Forces entering the Sabra and Shatila refugee camps and slaughtering almost two thousand Palestinian civilians, mostly women, children and the elderly. This occurred under the supervision of Israeli troops who illuminated the areas with flares and provided bulldozers for mass burials of the victims.

=== PLO retreat from Lebanon ===
Following the siege of Beirut, Arafat left for Greece, and then Tunis, establishing a new headquarters there. PLO fedayeen continued to operate out of Yemen, Algeria, Iraq, and the Sudan, as well as within Israeli-controlled territory.

In late 1983, 4,000 Arafat loyalists were evacuated from Tripoli on five Greek vessels.

=== Osama bin Laden's rationale for the 9/11 attacks ===
Decades later, the siege was cited by Osama bin Laden as a major reason for the September 11, 2001 attacks.

God knows it did not cross our minds to attack the Towers, but after the situation became unbearable—and we witnessed the injustice and tyranny of the American-Israeli alliance against our people in Palestine and Lebanon—I thought about it. And the events that affected me directly were those of 1982 and the events that followed—when America allowed the Israelis to invade Lebanon, helped by the U.S. Sixth Fleet. As I watched the destroyed towers in Lebanon, it occurred to me to punish the unjust the same way: to destroy towers in America so it could taste some of what we were tasting and to stop killing our children and women.

— Osama bin Laden, 2004

== See also ==
- United Nations Interim Force in Lebanon
- Memory for Forgetfulness
