= Id - Identity of the soul =

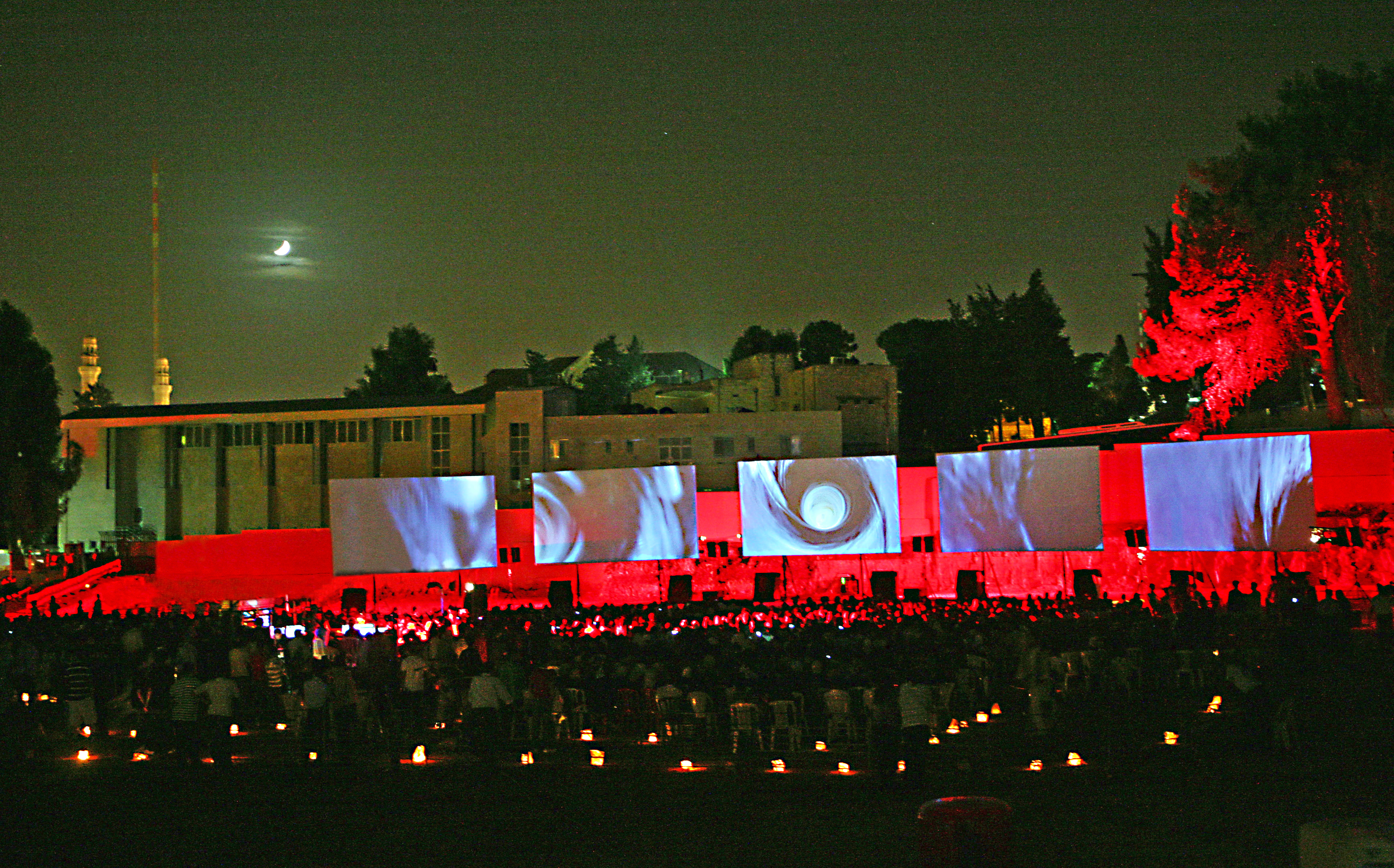
Performance in Ramallah, 2008

id - Identity of the Soul is a work of performance art produced by Martine Rød and directed by Thomas Hoegh. The first version of this work, Terje, was performed in Yokohama, Japan, in 2006 with Paal Ritter Schjerven as co-director and director of cinematography. The latest version premiered in Palestine in 2008. In 2009 the show then toured to Doha, Qatar, in May and to the Teater Ibsen in Skien, Norway, in June. The studio version of id (a smaller, more portable version of the production) had its English premiere at the Cambridge Film Festival on 17 September 2009 and is currently touring the UK.

Based on Norwegian playwright Henrik Ibsen's poem 'Terje Vigen' and Palestinian poet Mahmoud Darwish's "A Soldier Dreams of White Lilies", id is a combination of music and poetry along with film projected onto five separate screens. The soundtrack was composed by Paul Noble and Dan Berridge, and is a fusion of traditional Scandinavian and Arabic music with contemporary electronic rhythms.

Translations
Language	Narrator
English	Vanessa Redgrave
French	Jean Rochefort
Arabic	Mahmoud Darwish
Urdu	Irrfan Khan
Hebrew	Gila Almagor
Norwegian	Anne Grete Preus and Jan Wiig

== World Tour ==
id has been performed in several cities since 2006, and continues its world and UK tour

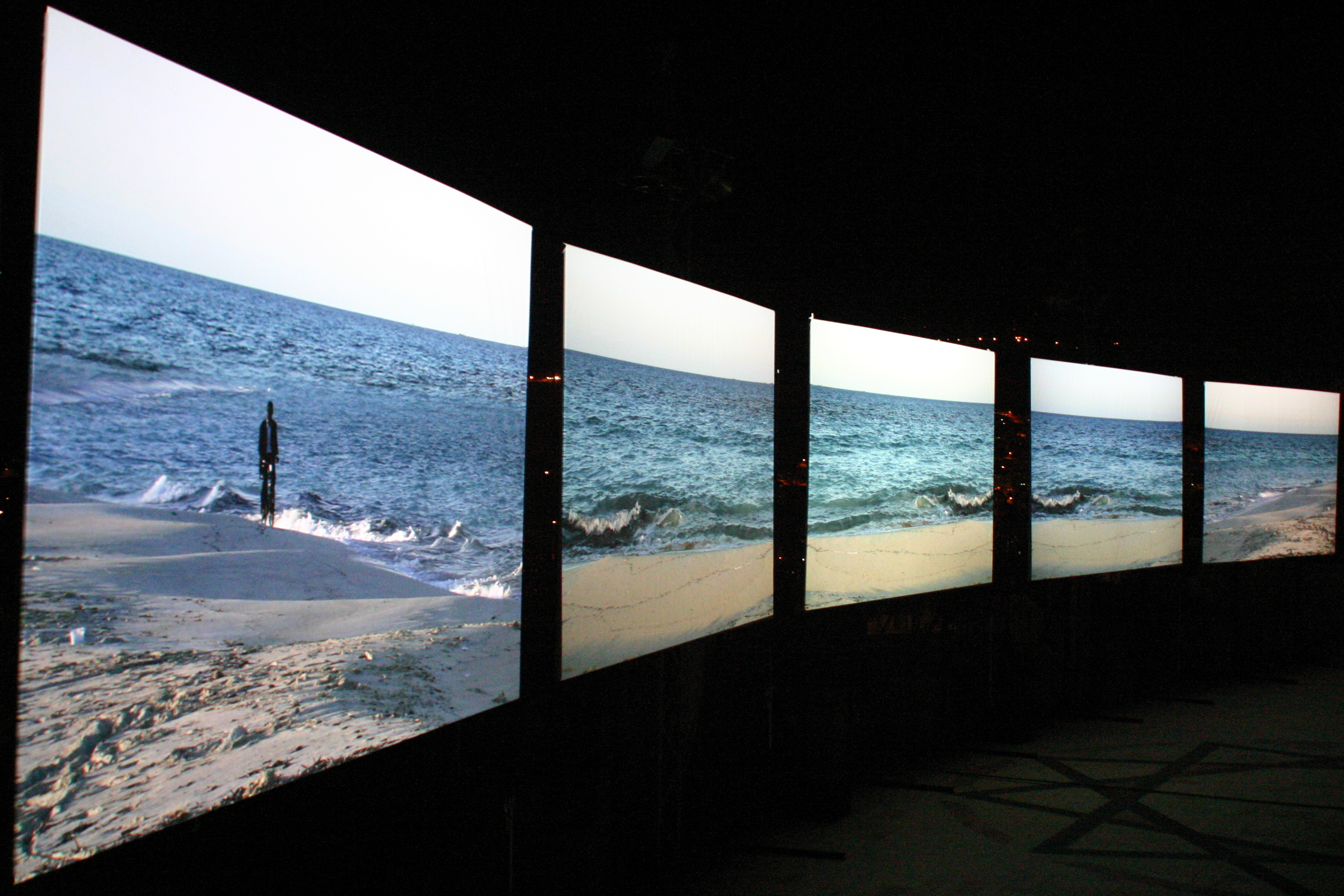
West Bank Tour

Year	Location
2006	Yokohama, Japan
2008	West Bank: Ramallah, Nablus, Bethlehem, Jerusalem, Hebron/Halhul, Qalqilya, Jericho and Jenin
March 2009	Doha, in Qatar
June 2009	Skien, in Norway
August 2009	Amman, in Jordan
September 2009	Cambridge Film Festival, Picturehouse Cinemas Curzon Cinema, Mayfair, London; Ritzy Cinema, Brixton, London, in Britain
October 2009	Picturehouse Cinemas Duke of York's Picturehouse, Brighton; Exeter Picturehouse; Harbour Lights Picturehouse, Southampton
November 2009	Picturehouse Cinemas Cameo Picturehouse, Edinburgh; Scala Cinema, Prestatyn; Chapter Cinema, Cardiff; Regal Picturehouse, Henley
January 2010	7pm Thursday 21 January, Birmingham Library Theatre
February 2010	2.30 pm Saturday 13 February, Pictureville National Media Museum, Bradford
March 2010	3pm, 5pm, 7pm 21 March, The Drum (Arts Centre), Birmingham
