= Muin Bseiso =

Palestinian poet (1926–1984)

Mu'in Bseiso
- Born: October 10, 1926; Gaza, Mandatory Palestine
- Died: January 23, 1984 (aged 57); London, United Kingdom
- Occupation: Poet

Mu'in Tawfiq Bseiso (October 10, 1926 – January 23, 1984; Arabic: معين بسيسو) was a Palestinian poet and playwright based in Egypt.

== Biography ==
He finished his primary and secondary education in Gaza in 1948. He started publishing his work in the Jaffa-based magazine al-Hurriya (Arabic: الحرية, 'Liberty'), where he published his first poems in 1946. Two years later, in 1948, he enrolled in the American University in Cairo and subsequently graduated in 1952. His dissertation was titled "The Spoken or Head Word in Lower Eastern Broadcast Media", analyzed the borders between radio and TV as well as printed newspaper media.

On January 27, 1952, he published his first work titled al-Ma'raka (Arabic: المعركة, 'The Battle'). He published several other volumes of poetry: Palestine in the Heart (1964), Trees Die Standing (1966). He was "closely associated with the Palestine Liberation Organization," including serving as cultural counselor to Yasser Arafat in 1981.

Bseiso was imprisoned in Egyptian jails in Gaza twice: 1955 to 1957 and 1959 to 1963. In one of them he met his future wife, Sahbaa al-Barbari, one of the first women Communists in Gaza.

He died due to heart failure in London in 1984. His body was buried near Cairo in Arba'inat Cemetery after Israel would not allow his family to bring him back to Gaza.

== Significant achievements ==
His works have been translated into English, French, German, Russian, Azeri, Uzbek, Italian, Spanish, Japanese, Vietnamese, and Persian. Mu'in Bseiso was awarded the Afro-Asian Lotus Prize for Literature and was the vice Editor in Chief of the Lotus magazine issued by the Afro-Asian Writers' Association. Additionally, he was the 1979 recipient of the Palestine Liberation Organization Dir' Al-Thawra (Arabic: درع الثورة, 'Revolution Shield').
