= Makoto Oda =

Japanese novelist and peace activist

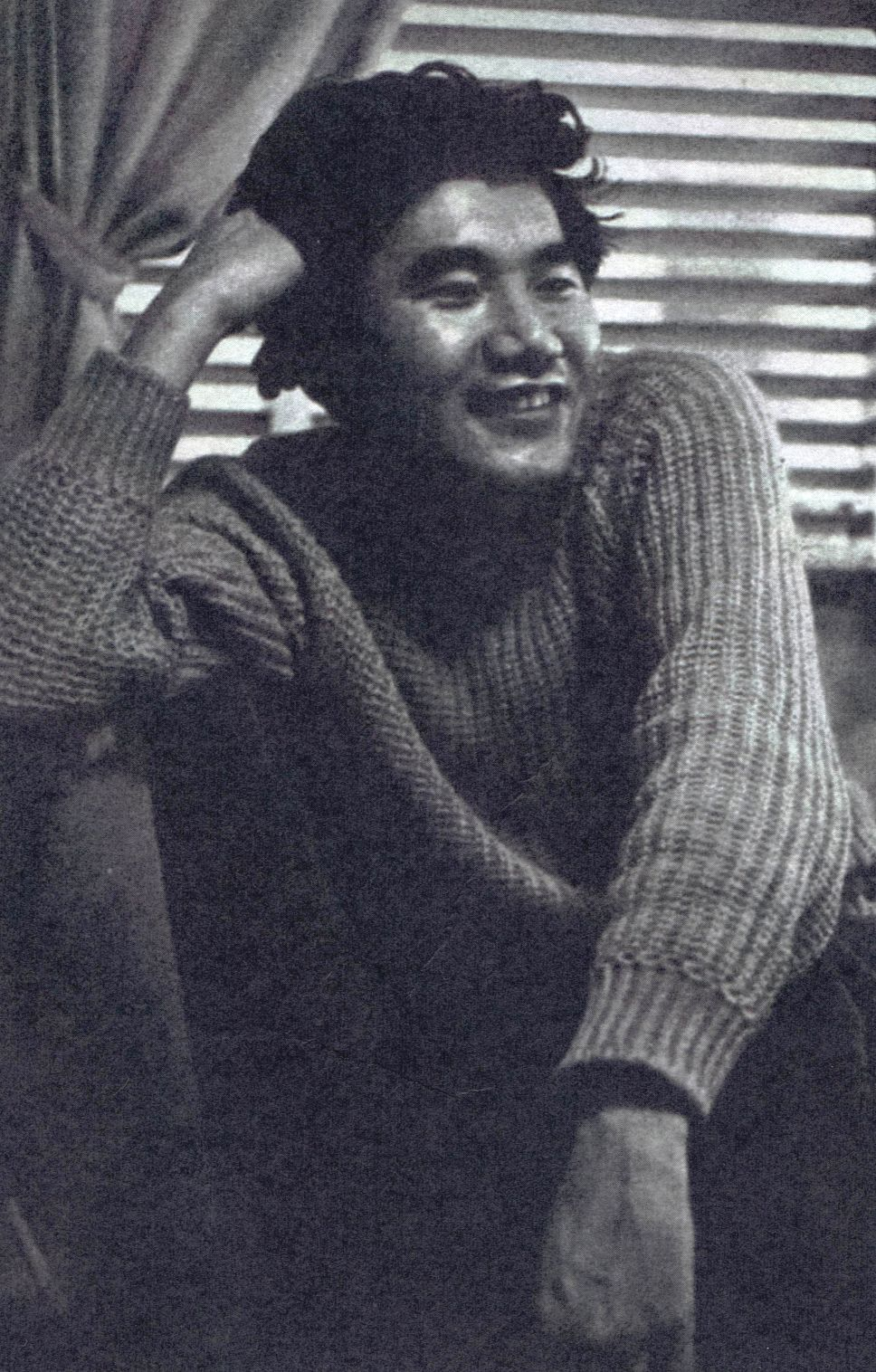
Oda in 1962.

Oda Makoto (小田 実, Oda Makoto; June 2, 1932 – July 30, 2007) was a Japanese novelist, peace activist, academic and Time Asian Hero.

== Early life and career ==
Oda was born in Osaka in 1932 and graduated from the University of Tokyo's Faculty of Letters program, majoring in classical Greek philosophy and literature. He won a Fulbright Scholarship to Harvard University in 1958.

== Writing ==
His travels through Europe and Asia on a budget of a dollar a day formed the basis of his 1961 bestseller Nandemo Mite yaro ("I'll go and see everything"). His first book Asatte no Shuki ("The Notebook of the Day After Tomorrow") was published in 1951. It was based on experiences during World War II and the Korean War. His first full-length novel, "Amerika" ("America") was published in 1962.

Oda won the Lotus Prize in 1981 of the Afro-Asian Writers' Association for his book Hiroshima. This led to a 1990 English translation as well as translations in French, Arabic, Italian, Korean and Russian. It was written about the atomic bombing of Hiroshima and Nagasaki not only in Japan but on the Hopi Indians and Americans who lived near the testing sites.

He won the Kawabata Yasunari Prize for Aboji o Fumu ("Stomping Father"), published in 1998. Oda's novel The Breaking Jewel was published in English in 2003. It was about Japanese forces on a South Pacific island facing an American invasion at the end of World War II.

== Activism ==
In 1965, he co-founded Beheiren (Citizens' League for Peace in Vietnam) with philosopher Shunsuke Tsurumi and writer Takeshi Kaiko to protest against the Vietnam War. He was an inaugural member of the Article 9 Association set up to protect Article 9 of the Constitution of Japan which renounces Japan's right to wage war. Oda was a prolific writer on political topics starting with Heiwa o tsukuru genri ("The Principles of Peace") in 1966.

Oda was also instrumental in the formation of Japanese war memory in the late '60s and early '70s. He was the first of his generation of peace activists to begin to question the then-dominant narrative of Japan as a victim of war aggression, rather than as victimizer, during the Second World War.

Oda died of stomach cancer in July 2007, aged 75.

His memorial service was held on August 4, 2007 at the Aoyama Sogisho funeral hall in Tokyo and was attended by about 800 people, including well-known persons in the political, literary and activist fields in Japan. Afterward, an estimated 500 people held a peace march in Oda's memory, marching through the streets of downtown Tokyo and vowing to carry on Oda's anti-war activist efforts.
