= Suheil Kiwan =

Palestinian journalist and novelist

- Born: 1956 (age 69–70)
- Occupations: Journalist, novelist, playwright
- Writing career
- Notable awards: – Tawfiq Zayyad Institution Award – Award of recognition from Al-Midan Theater – National Award from Anna Lindh Foundation for children's literature

Suheil Kiwan (Arabic:سهيل كيوان) is a Palestinian journalist and novelist. He won the Tawfiq Zayyad Institution Award in 2002 for his critical study titled ‘Ghassan Kanafani: Al-Jamal Al-Hazeen wa Al-‘Ata’ Al-Mutawahij'.

== Early life ==
He was born in Majd al-Krum in the Western Galilee in 1956. He studied primary school in his village, and continued his secondary studies in the Agricultural High School. He studied Philosophy for a year in Eastern Berlin. He worked as a literary editor in Al-Arabi magazine, which issues from Nazareth, from 1998 till 2014. In 1983, he started working in Al-Jadid magazine, which issues from Haifa, and in Al-Ittihad newspaper. He also writes for Al-Quds Al-Arabi newspaper, which is issued in London, and Arab 48 website. He published novels, story collections, children's stories, and plays. He works with the Academy of the Arabic Language and Al-Salla Al-Thaqafiya program which host him as a writer, where he meets students. He won the Tawfiq Zayyad Institution Award in 2002 for a critical study titled ‘Ghassan Kanafani: Al-Jamal AL-Hazeen wa Al-‘Ata’ Al-Mutawahij’ in Ghassan Kanafani's literature.

== Works ==
=== Novels ===
- Asi Al-Dam’, 1997, Dar Al-Aswar, Acre, Palestine
- Maqtal Al-Tha’er Al-Akheer, 1998, Dar Al-Aswar, Acre, Palestine
- Al-Mafqood Raqam 2000, Dar Al-Aswar, Acre, Palestine
- Balad Al-Manhoos, 2018, Kul Shee Library, Haifa, Palestine

=== Studies ===
- Homeros min Al-Sahra’: Dirasat fi Shi’r Samih al-Qasim, (co-operative work), 2000
- Ghassan Kanafani: Al-Jamal AL-Hazeen wa Al-‘Ata’ Al-Mutawahij, 2002, Palestinian Organisation for National Guidance

=== Plays ===
- El-Ardh Bet’thel Tdor, (performed in Al-Risala Theatre in Majd Al-Krum), (not published), 1982
- Sitta ‘Ala Sitta, a satirical play which won an award of recognition from Al-Midan Theater in Haifa
- Awraq Fat’hiya Al-A’far, (a play in vernacular), published in acts in Kul Al-Arab newspaper in 2004
- Ma’a Fa’eq Al-Ihtiram, Al-Karma Theater, directed by Nabil Azir
- Mamlakat Al-Maraya, first edition published in 2008, followed by multiple reprints, illustrated by Anna Forlati, Dar Al-Aswar, Acre, Palestine. The play was performed in Beit Al-Karama in Haifa, Palestine

=== Children's stories ===
- Al-Qird Al-Shareh, first edition published in 1995, illustrated by Irina Karkabi, Children's literature Center
- Al-Asafeer Al-Tayiba, 1998, illustrated by Juhaina Habibi Qandilfit, Children's literature Center, Haifa, Palestine
- Kharboosha wa Awladuha, 2005, Elizabeth Mahameed, Children's literature Center, Nazareth, Palestine
- Zafaf Haleeb wa Shokolata, 2012, illustrated by Vita Tenniel, Dar Al-Huda
- Aghla min Al-Thahab bi Katheer, 2013, illustrated by Nawar Abu Khidra Rashid, Al-Kitab wa Al-Maktabat Centre in Palestine, Arabic Children's Literature
- ‘Ilbat Halawa, illustrated by Manar N’eerat, 2015, Dar Al-Aswar, Acre, Palestine
- Fi Qaryatina Intikhabat, 2016, Dar Al-Aswar, Acre, Palestine
- Mamlakat Al-Maraya, first edition published in 2008, followed by multiple reprints, illustrated by Anna Forlati, Dar Al-Aswar, Acre, Palestine. The play was performed in Beit Al-Karama in Haifa, Palestine

=== Story collections ===
- Al-Mubaraza, 1991, Dar Al-Aswar, Acre, Palestine
- Ahzan Al-Nakheel, 1993
- That Sat’h Al-Hibr, 2005, Dar Al-Majid, Ram’Allah
- Madih Likhazooq ‘Akhar, 2013, Dar Al-Raya, Haifa
- Masra’ Hatem Tai, 2018, Kul Shee Library, Haifa

== Awards ==
- Tawfiq Zayyad Institution Award in 2001 for a critical study titled ‘Ghassan Kanafani: Al-Jamal AL-Hazeen wa Al-‘Ata’ Al-Mutawahij’ in Ghassan Kanafani's literature
- Award of recognition from Al-Midan Theater in Haifa for his play Sitta ala Sitta
- National Award from Anna Lindh Foundation for children's literature for his play Mamlakat Al-Maraya, which was produced by Qasim Sha’ban, and published by Dar Al-Aswar lil Tifl, Acre
