= Mroue =

Mroue, also spelt Mroué, Mroueh and Muruwwa, is a Lebanese surname. Notable people with the surname include:

- Husayn Muruwwa (also spelt Hussein Mroue or Mroueh) (c. 1909–1987), Lebanese philosopher, journalist, author, and literary critic
- Nizar Mroue (also spelt Neezar Mroue or Mururwwah) (1931–1992), Syrian-born Lebanese music critic
- Rabih Mroué (born 1967), Lebanese stage and film actor, playwright, and visual artist
