= Vietnam war refugees =

Vietnam war refugees refers to people forced to flee from their countries and become refugees in relation to the Vietnam War.

== Refugees ==
- Vietnamese boat people, refugees that fled Vietnam after the Vietnam War.
- Vietnam War resisters in Canada, American refugees who fled to Canada to avoid service in the Vietnam War.
- Vietnam War resisters in Sweden, American refugees who fled to Sweden to avoid service in the Vietnam War.

== Events ==
- Indochina refugee crisis, outflow of refugees due to insurgencies in Indochina.
