= American refugees =

American refugees refers to refugees that are from or chose to reside in the United States, such as:

== Refugees from the United States ==
- "Black Refugee", African-American slaves who fled to Canada during the War of 1812.
- Exodusters, African Americans fleeing to Kansas after the Reconstruction Era.
- "Loyalist refugees", loyalist refugees expelled after the American Revolution.
- Underground Railroad, networks of slaves fleeing to Canada.
- Vietnam War resisters in Canada, Americans fleeing military service in Canada.
- Vietnam War resisters in Sweden, Americans fleeing military service in Sweden.

== Refugees in the United States ==
- Asylum in the United States, American policy of accepting refugees.
