= Lotus Prize for Literature =

International literary award

The Lotus Prize for Literature (also known as Lotus International Reward for Literature or The Lotus Prize for African and Asian Literature) is a literary award presented annually to African and Asian authors by the Afro-Asian Writers' Association (also known as Association of Asian and African Writers). It was established in 1969 but cancelled in 1988. During this period, the Soviet Union was the sponsor of the prize. After this lengthy hiatus, in November 2019, it was reinstated following the renaming of the institution as the Writers' Union of Africa, Asia, and Latin American (WUAALA).

The Bureau, as the association was initially known, was founded in Sri Lanka in 1958. In 1962, it moved to Cairo, with Yusuf Sibai elected general secretary. The Bureau began to publish a magazine, Lotus, a forum for short stories, poetry, book reviews, and literary essays. The inaugural Lotus Prize was given in 1969 to Alex La Guma, who was living in exile in London at the time. After the assassination of its secretary general, the Bureau moved to Beirut, then Tunisia, and finally back to Cairo. Former Arab League secretary general Lutfi El-Kholi became its secretary general and when he died, the movement began to falter.

== Selected winners ==
- 1969 Alex La Guma
- 1969 Mahmoud Darwish
- 1970 Waleed Seif
- 1971 Sonomyn Udval
- 1972 Hiroshi Noma
- 1973 Ngũgĩ wa Thiong'o
- 1974 Yusuf Sibai
- 1975 Kim Chi-Ha
- 1975 Ghassan Kanafani
- 1975 Chinua Achebe
- 1976 Faiz Ahmed Faiz
- 1977 Subhas Mukhopadhyay
- 1978 Meja Mwangi
- 1978 Abd Alkareem Alkarmi (Abu Salma)
- 1979 Antonio Jacinto
- 1980 Hussein Morowah (also spelled as Mroué)
- 1981 Bhisham Sahni
- 1981 Makoto Oda
- 1982 Ataol Behramoglu
- 1983 José Craveirinha
- 1986 Abdulaziz Al-Maqaleh
