= Japan's Threepenny Opera =

1959 novel by Takeshi Kaikō

Japan's Threepenny Opera (日本三文オペラ, Nihon Sanmon Opera) is a novel by Takeshi Kaiko published in 1959.

The name was derived from Bertold Brecht's Threepenny Opera and in a way is its variant, in the Japanese setting.

The novel is based on actual events. It is set in post-World War II Japan. In the middle of Osaka there are ruins of the Imperial Arsenal demolished by American bombing, full of scrap metal. While the metals are precious in the destroyed economy of Japan, state bureaucracy is extremely slow to recover them. A settlement of outcasts, lumpen proletariat, spontaneously organize themselves into teams, using this circumstance as an opportunity to sneak into the Arsenal and scavenge the scrap. Reporters dubbed them "Apaches", after the Native American Apache tribe, and they accepted the name.

The novel seemingly has no positive heroes, it is intentionally anti-aesthetical, but the reader feels sympathy for these people struggling for life in the miniature copy of the capitalist society with all its attributes: division of labour, exploitation, hard toil and the dream to get rich quick.

After this novel the term "apache" entered the Japanese language to denote scavengers of recyclables, e.g., of scrap paper.
