= Military history of African Americans in the Vietnam War =

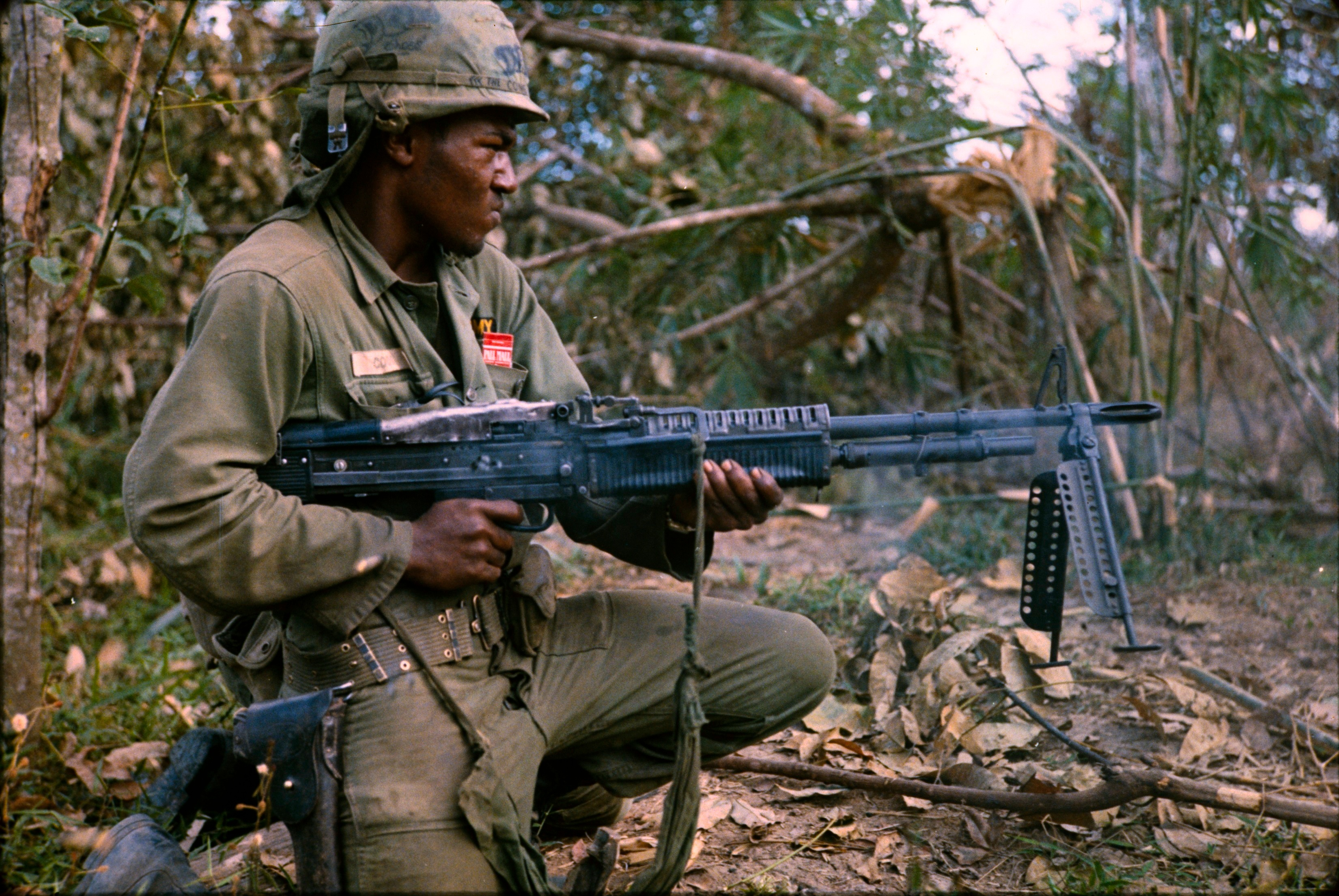
A Black American soldier during Operation Cedar Falls, 1967

African Americans played a prominent role in the Vietnam War. The Vietnam War was the first American war in which Black and White troops were not formally segregated, and even saw significant growth in the number of African Americans engaged in battlefield combat, though some de facto segregation still occurred.

== Background ==
African Americans have always been involved in United States military service since its inception despite official policies of racial segregation and discrimination. In 1948 President Harry S. Truman abolished discrimination on the basis of race, color, religion or national origin. By 1953, the final black only unit was abolished.

== Draft ==
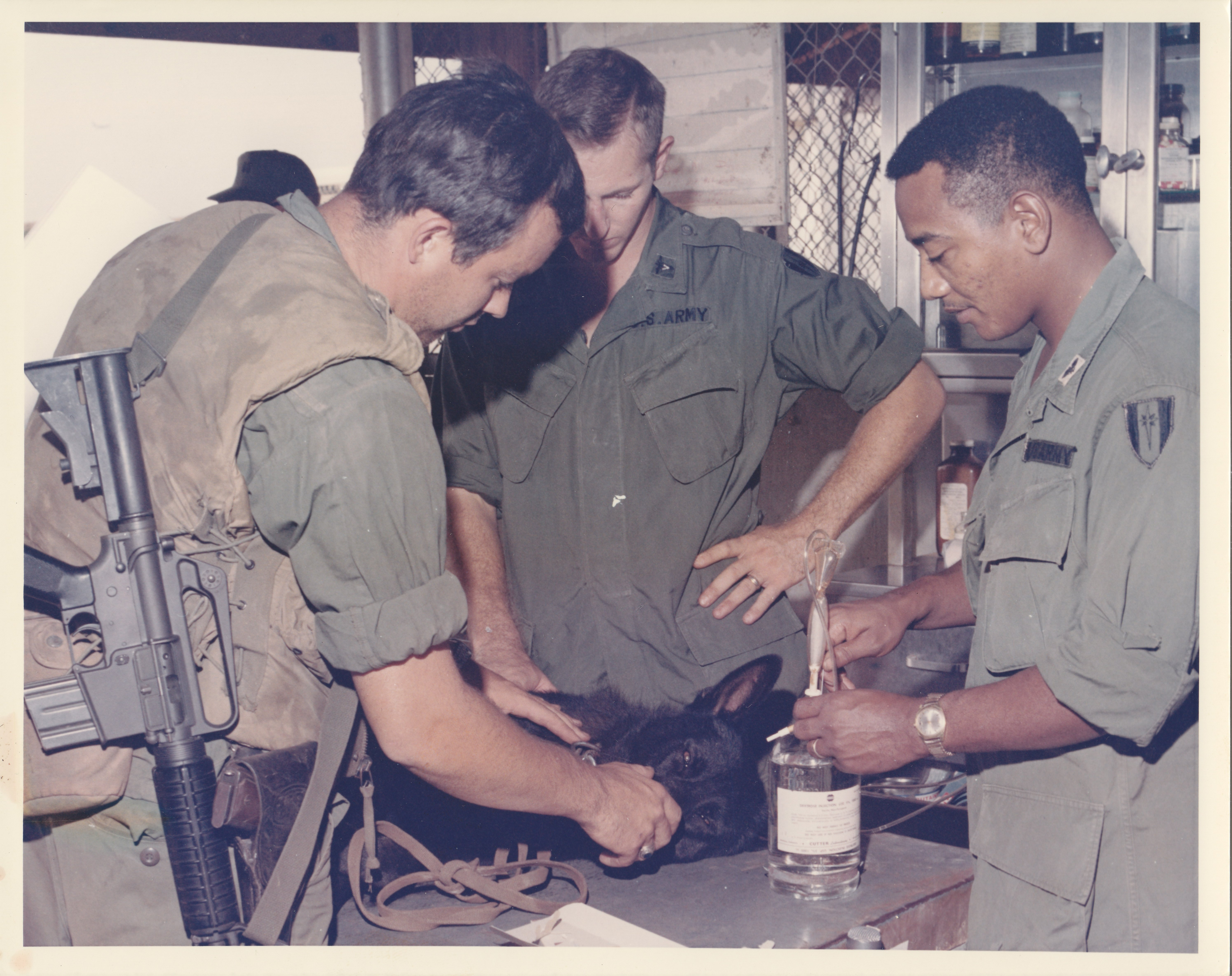
Capt. William T. Watson, aids injured dog.

Black Americans were more likely to be drafted than White Americans. The Vietnam War saw the highest proportion of African-American soldiers in the US military up to that point. Though comprising 11% of the US population in 1967, African Americans were 16.3% of all draftees.

During the period of the Vietnam War, well over half of African American draft registrants were found ineligible for military service, compared with only 35-50% of white registrants. For example, in 1967, 29% of African Americans were found eligible for military service, compared to 63% of whites; the armed services drafted 64% of the eligible African American registrants, in comparison to 31% of the eligible white registrants. Project 100,000, which helped dramatically increase US troop presence in Vietnam from 23,300 in 1965 to 465,600 two years later, sharply increased the number of African American troops drafted. By lowering the education standards of the draft, an estimated 40% of the 246,000 draftees of Project 100,000 were Black. A total of 300,000 African-Americans served in Vietnam. According to Daniel Lucks the reason behind the high turnout was the pay, which for many, was more than they had ever made in their lives, and that young African Americans "perceived military service as a vocational opportunity, and they had the additional incentive to enlist to prove on the battlefield that they were worthy of their newly acquired civil rights."

Some activists in the US speculated that the uneven application of the draft was a method of Black genocide. From the years, 1966 to 1969, opinion of the draft grew increasingly negative. A 1966 poll from Newsweek found that 25% of African Americans thought of the laws as unfair. A similar poll in 1969 saw the number rise to 47%. Black people were starkly under-represented on draft boards in this era, with none on the draft boards of Louisiana, Mississippi, Alabama, or Arkansas. In Louisiana, Jack Helms, a Grand Wizard of the Ku Klux Klan, served on the draft board from 1957 until 1966. In 1966, 1.3% of the US draft board members were African American with only Delaware having a proportionate number of African American board members to the African American population. In 1967, the NAACP Legal Defense Fund and the American Civil Liberties Union filed a lawsuit in South Carolina demanding that South Carolina halt the drafting of African Americans on the grounds of their absence on the state's draft boards. By 1970, the number of African Americans on the draft boards grew from 230 to 1,265, though this still only represented 6.6% of all draft board members.

== Service ==
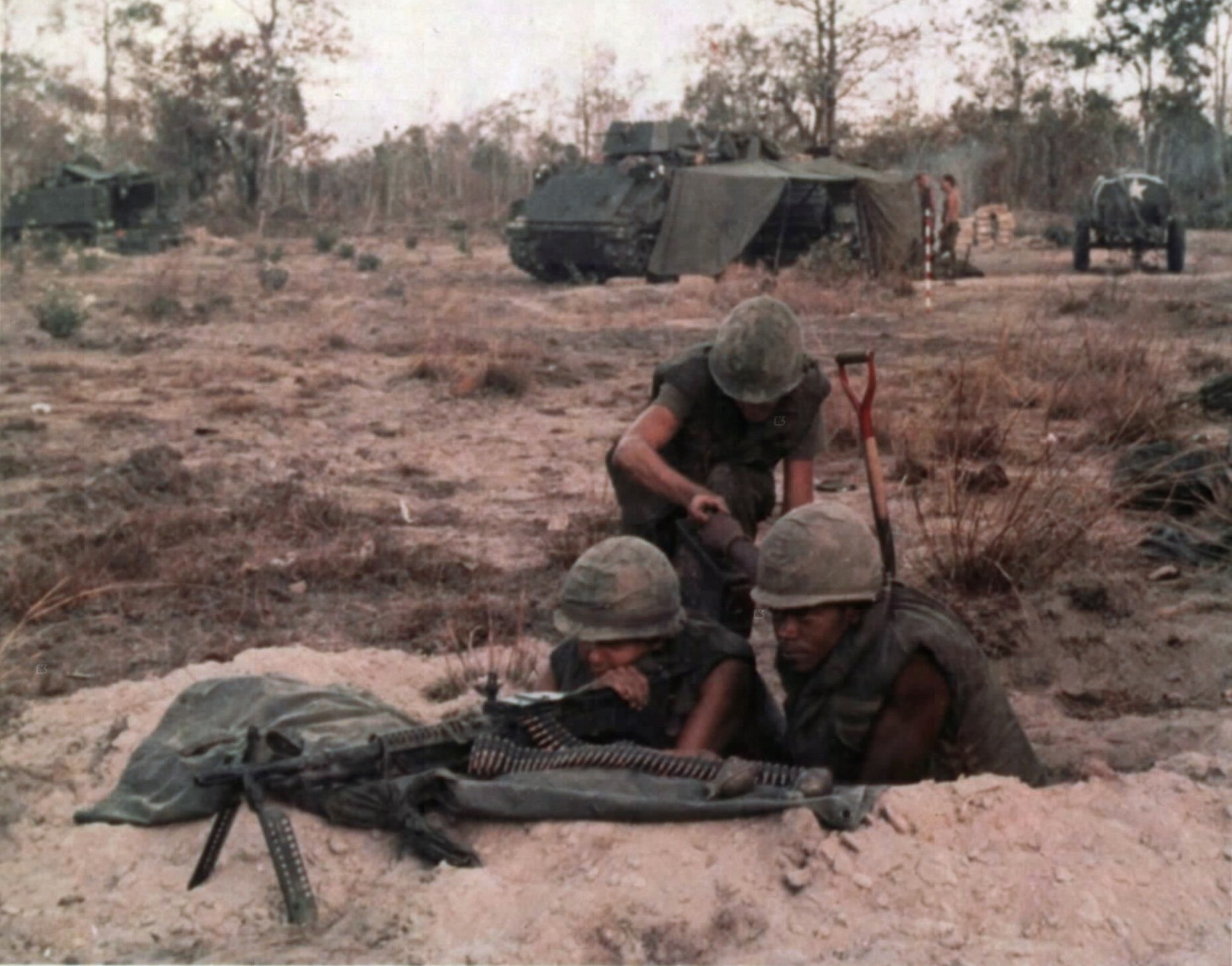
Members of the 2nd Platoon, Company A, 1st Battalion, 50th Infantry (Mechanized), set up an M-60 machine gun position during a search and clear mission

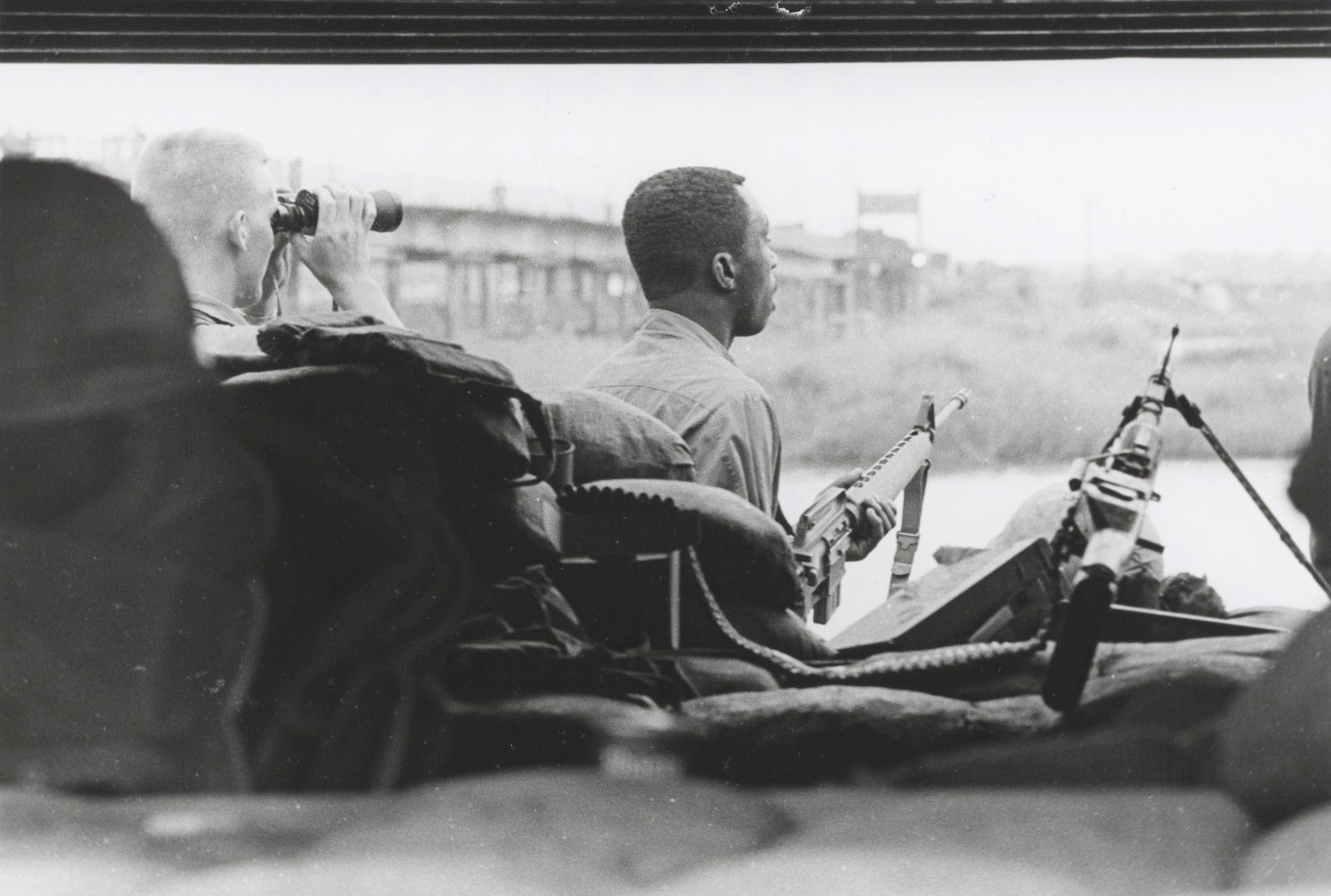
Company D, 1st Military Police Battalion Marines keep watch on the Cam Le Bridge

Across all branches of the military, African Americans composed 11% of all troops. However, a disproportionately small number were made officers, with only 5% of Army officers African American, and 2% across all branches. In 1968, out of the 400,000 officers, there were only 8325 African American officers. Out of the 1342 admirals and generals, there were only 2 African Americans generals – Lieutenant General Benjamin O. Davis and Brigadier General Frederic E. Davison – and no African-American admirals.

African American troops were more likely to be assigned to combat units: 23% of such troops in Vietnam were African Americans. In some airborne units African Americans composed 45-60% of troops. Racism against African Americans was particularly pronounced in the Navy. Only 5% of sailors were Black in 1971, with less than 1% of Navy officers African American. From 1966 to 1967, the reenlistment rate for African Americans was 50%, twice what it was for white soldiers. It would rise to 66.5% in 1967 but then drop to 31.7% in 1968. The growth in African Americans serving in battlefield combat during the Vietnam war was considered a shift in the attitude from previous wars that black men were not meant to serve in combat.

=== Discrimination ===
Overt racism was typical in American bases in Vietnam. Although initially uncommon at the start of the war, after the Assassination of Martin Luther King Jr., overt racism occurred at a higher rate. Following the assassination, some White troops at Cam Ranh Base wore Ku Klux Klan robes and paraded around the base. At least three instances of cross burning were confirmed to have happened. Da Nang Air Base flew the Confederate flag for three days in response. In addition to being used in response to King's murder, Confederate flags and icons were commonly painted on jeeps, tanks, and helicopters; bathroom graffiti proclaimed that African Americans, not the Vietnamese, were the real enemy. Black troops were discouraged from taking pride in Black identity, with one troop ordered to remove a "Black is beautiful" poster from his locker. Following complaints from African American soldiers, Confederate flags were briefly banned but soon allowed after resistance from Southern politicians objected. Black identity publications and speeches were restricted, with some commanders banning recordings of speeches by Malcolm X or the newspaper The Black Panther. Despite segregation being abolished in the military, it still affected troops.

According to journalists Wallace Terry and Zalin Grant by 1968, racial incidents in Danang, Cam Ranh Bay, Dong Tam, Saigon, and Bien Hoa happened on an "almost daily basis" and had become "commonplace". Similar reports came from official channels with there being at least 33 incidents of racial violence in the two months between December 1969 and January 1970. In 1970 there were 1,060 reported cases of violent racial conflict. Racial incidents also affected the Navy and Air Force. Following King's death race riots and conflicts occurred at Long Binh jail and Camp Lejuene. The former was the worst race riot in the U.S. Army's history and the latter garnered national attention due to 44 African-American soldiers being arrested but no white soldiers. It also inspired an investigation and creation of a committee to study racial bias and African American militancy in the armed forces. Grant once claimed that the "biggest threat" to the U.S. military was "race riots, not the Vietcong."

Many African American soldiers claimed that they were unfairly targeted for punishment, including being denied for promotion and disproportionately assigned menial tasks. A 1970 Army study of the 197th Infantry Brigade reported that African Americans soldiers frequently complained that “white NCOs always put black soldiers on the dirtiest details.” L. Howard Bennett, the deputy assistant secretary of defense for civil rights in the Lyndon Johnson and Richard Nixon administrations noted a similar occurrence, that African Americans soldiers would "complained that they are discriminated against in promotions ... that they will stay in grade too long, that they will train and teach whites who come in and pretty soon their trainees pass them by and get the promotion." These complaints were rarely taken serious. From 1968 to 1969 only 10 out of 534 were deemed legitimate. During this time period (1966–1969) a study commissioned by the Army found that, commanders had failed to report 423 allegations of racial discrimination.

Black culture and norms were also not initially acknowledged on bases. Black troops did not have access to Black haircare products, soul music tapes, nor books or magazines about Black culture and history. Instead, the Armed Forces Radio Network mostly played country music. Military barbers frequently had no experience cutting Black hair, and received no formal training on how to do so.

The Armed Forces took some action to make Black troops feel more included, including adding more diverse music to club jukeboxes, hiring Black bands and dancers for events, and bringing over Black entertainers to perform, such as James Brown, Miss Black America, and Miss Black Utah. Base exchanges began to stock Black haircare products and garments like dashikis, while books about Black culture and history were added to base libraries. By 1973, military barbers had been trained on how to cut Black hair. Mandated race relations training was introduced and soldiers were encouraged to be more accepting. Ultimately, many of these changes were made towards the end of the war when personnel had been greatly reduced, meaning that a majority of Black troops who served during the Vietnam War did not benefit from these reforms.

=== Internal resistance ===
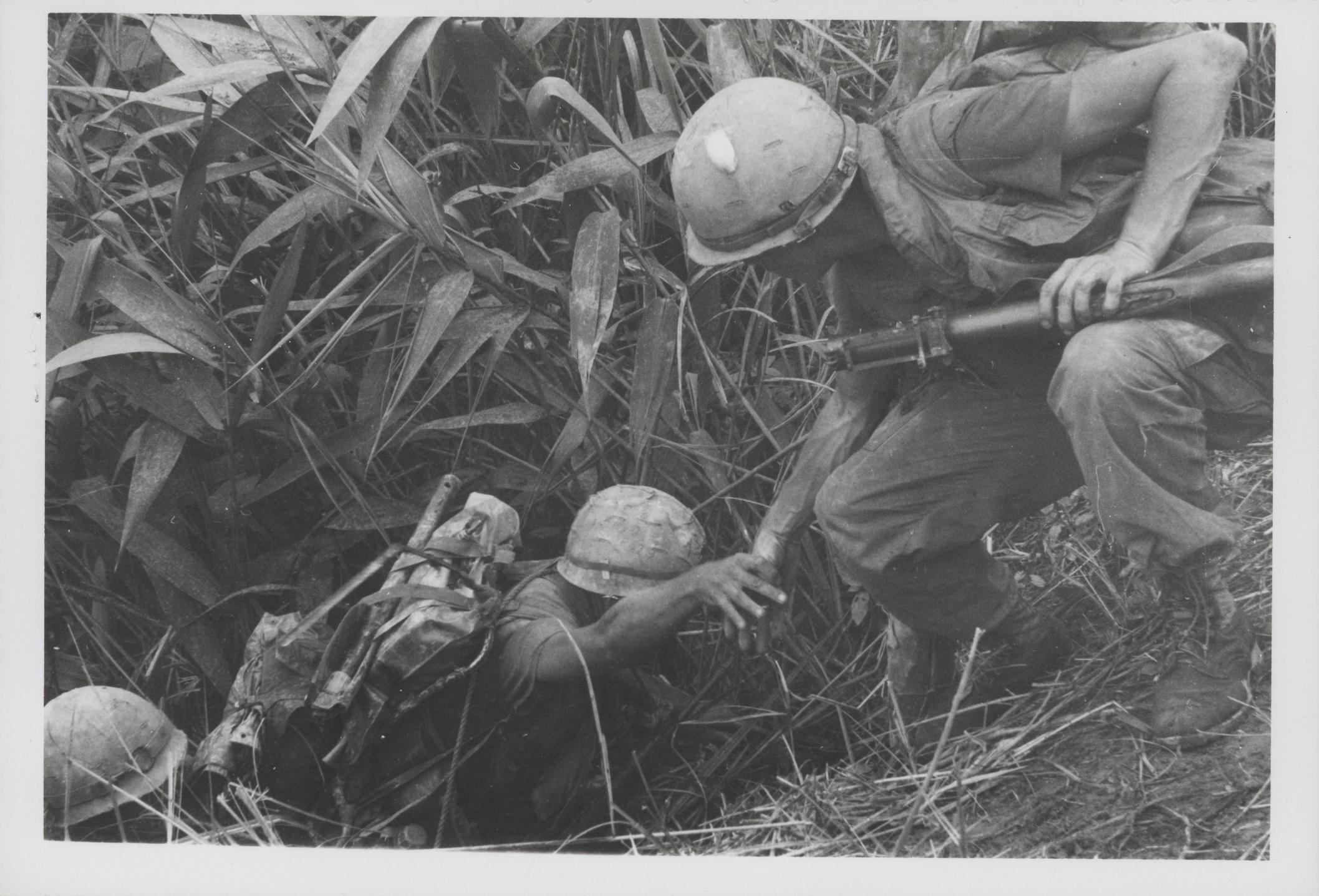
White soldier helps black soldier climb ravine.

Racial tensions created internal divisions, causing Black soldiers to sometimes refuse to fight. One such incident near the A Sầu Valley caused fifteen Black soldiers to refuse to report for combat patrol the following day. Almost 200 Black troops who were imprisoned at Long Bình Jail staged a work strike for more than a month following a riot. In another incident, a race riot occurred on the USS Kitty Hawk, after the ship was forced to cancel its trip home and return to Vietnam. Black and White sailors attacked each other with chains and pipes, resulting in the arrest of twenty-five Black sailors, though no White ones. On the USS Constellation, Black sailors organized to investigate the application of non-judicial punishment among White and Black sailors. Six of the organizers were given less-than-honorable discharges, with rumors that up to 200 Black sailors would receive the same punishment. On November 3, 1972, about 100 Black sailors and a few White sailors staged a sit-in protest on the ship's deck. Many of the dissidents were ultimately reassigned from the ship, with a few discharged.

Several Black troops deserted their posts. A few were smuggled through the USSR into Sweden, while up to 100 lived in a region of Saigon known as Soul Alley.

=== Solidarity ===
Black identity movements within Vietnam War troops grew over time, with Black troops drafted from 1967 – 1970 calling themselves "Bloods". Bloods distinguished themselves by wearing black gloves and amulets, as well as bracelets made out of boot laces. Dap handshakes, or complex ritualized handshakes, originated among Black troops of the Vietnam War. The dap varied among units. Black troops and officers acknowledged each other in public with a Black Power salute, which is raising a fist. By 1969 a "new African American" soldier had arisen, categorized by "a new sense of African American pride and purpose."

The Black Liberation Front of the Armed Forces was a Black solidarity group formed by Eddie Burney. In 1971, Burney and other Black troops stationed in Vietnam held a demonstration in response to King's assassination. Within the Air Force, at least twenty-five Black solidarity groups had formed by 1970, many of which were based in the US. Another group formed on the USS Constellation, known as The Black Fraction. Other groups that formed included Minority Servicemen's Association, the Concerned Veterans Association, Black Brothers United, the Zulu 1200s, the Black Liberation Front of the Armed Forces, Blacks In Action, the Unsatisfied Black Soldiers, the Ju Jus, and the Mau Maus.

=== Friendly white and black relations ===
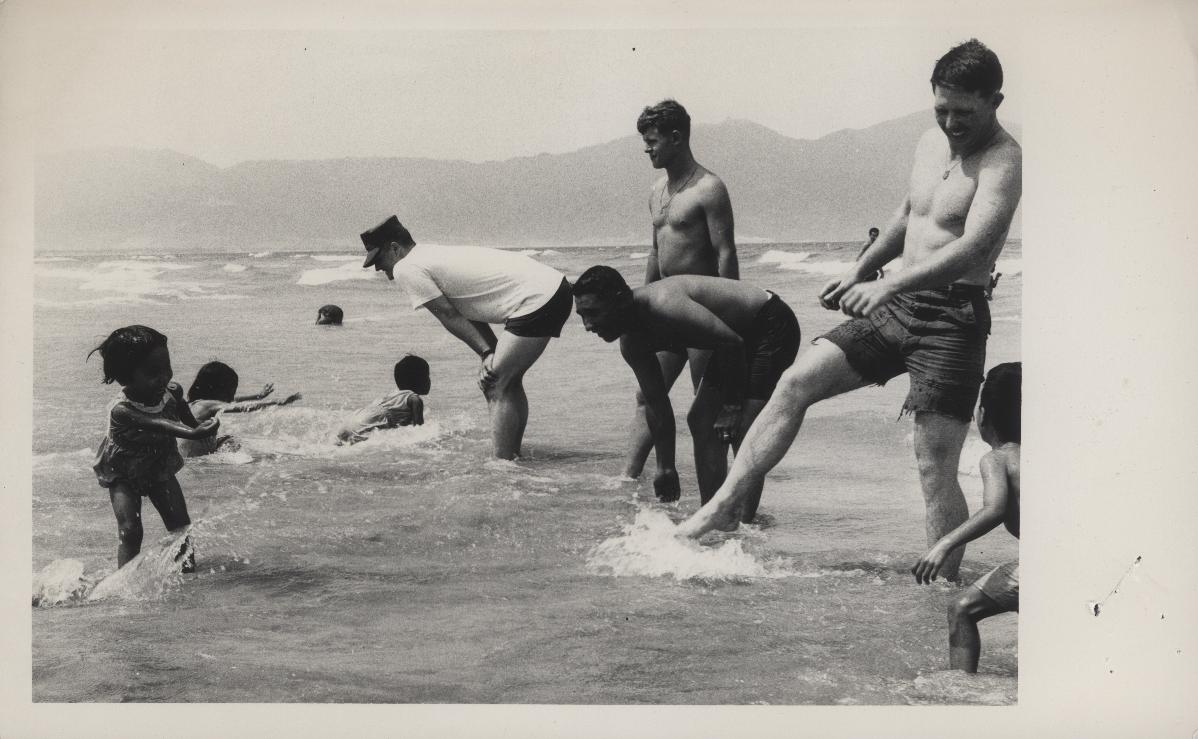
Black and white Marines play with children from an orphanage.

During the Vietnam War, many black and white soldiers formed close friendships. NBC journalist Frank McGee, who spent nearly a month living with soldiers of the 101st Airborne Division recalled that "Nowhere in America have I seen Negroes and whites as free, open and uninhibited with their associations. I saw no eyes clouded with resentment." African American Sergeant Lewis B. Larry shared similar sentiments stating that "There's no racial barrier of any sort here". Many fellow African American soldiers echoed McGee's beliefs; in 1989 Wallace Terry stated that "the front lines of Vietnam" was the only place where Martin Luther King Jr's dream of "sons of former slaves and sons of slave owners [sitting] at the same table [came true]". He did however acknowledge beforehand that "[there is] another war being fought in Vietnam — between black and white Americans."

== Punishment and casualties ==
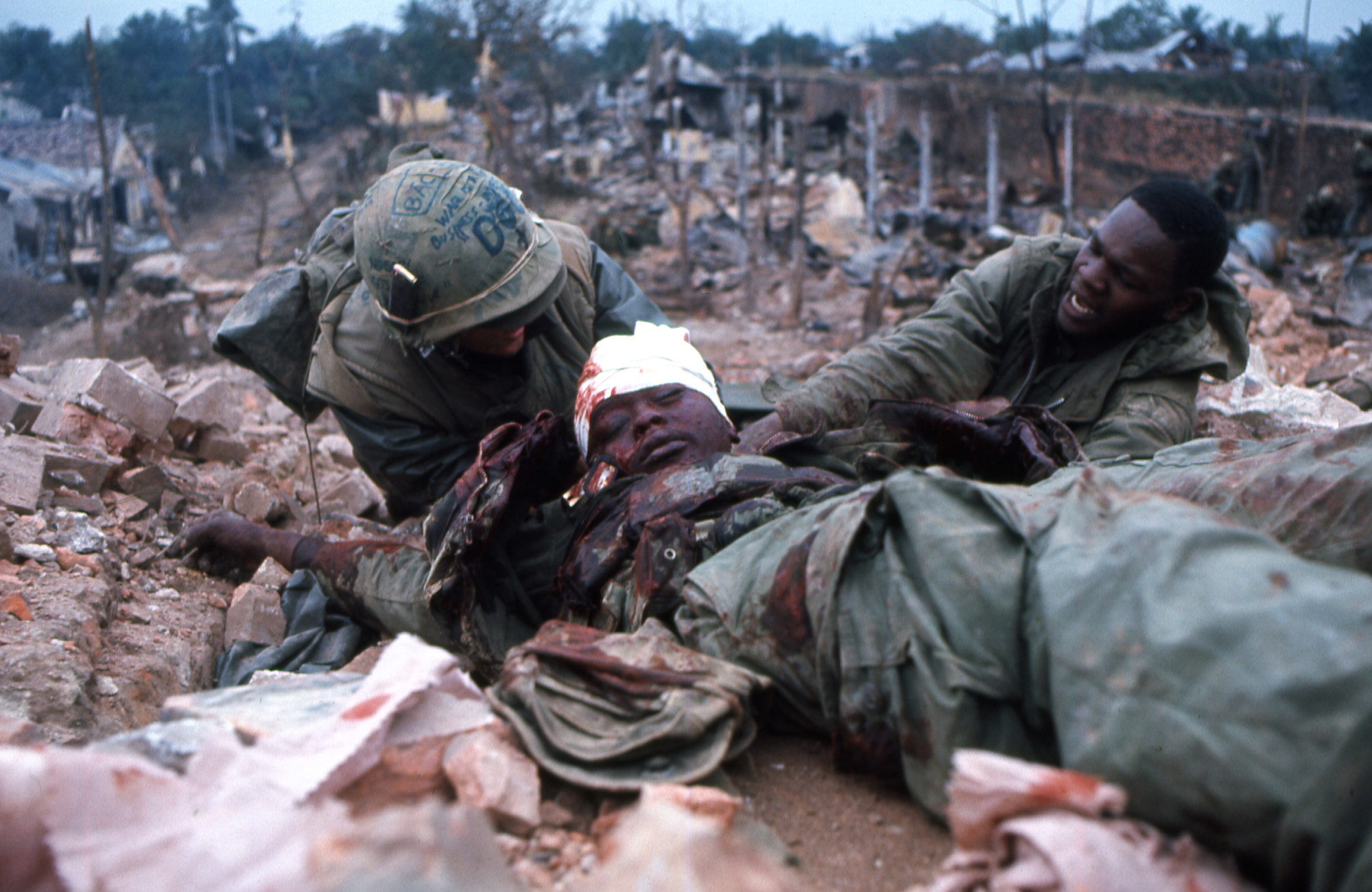
Two Marines help severely wounded Marine.

African American troops were punished more harshly and more frequently than White troops. A Defense Department study released in 1972 found that Black troops received 34.3% of courts-martial, 25.5% of nonjudicial punishments, and comprised 58% of prisoners at Long Bình Jail, a military prison. It further remarked, "No command or installation...is entirely free from the effects of systematic discrimination against minority servicemen." Black troops were also almost twice as likely as White troops to receive a punitive discharge. In 1972, African-Americans received more than one-fifth of the bad-conduct discharges and nearly one-third of the dishonorable discharges.

In the Vietnam War, African American troops initially had a much higher casualty rate than other ethnicities, though this declined somewhat throughout the course of the conflict. In 1965, nearly a quarter of troop casualties were African American. By 1967, it had fallen to 12.7%. In total, 7,243 African Americans died during the Vietnam War, representing 12.4% of total casualties. The refusal, by some southern communities, to bury dead African American soldiers in unsegregated cemeteries was met with outrage by African American communities.

== Views on the war ==
While at the start of the war the vast majority of African American soldiers "believed America was protecting the sovereignty of the democratically constituted government in South Vietnam and halting the spread of communism in Southeast Asia" King's opposition to the Vietnam War and death saw disillusionment and anti-war rhetoric grow among African American soldiers. The Project 100,000 and racism within the military also furthered the anger of African American soldiers. By the summer of 1968, correspondent Deckle McLean reported that few African-American soldiers supported the war.

== After the war ==
In the mid-1980s, African American veterans of the Vietnam War were twice as likely as White veterans to experience posttraumatic stress disorder (PTSD), at a prevalence of 40%. Reasons for the disparity in PTSD prevalence could include social and racial discord during the war, institutional racism within the military, and racism after the war. Black troops were also more likely than White troops to relate to the Vietnamese people as an impoverished, non-white group. Additionally, Black troops were less likely to rationalize brutal violence employed against the Vietnamese, and were significantly more disturbed by it than White troops. It has been speculated that White troops were more able to dehumanize the Vietnamese than Black troops.

According to psychologists Richard Strayer and Lewis Ellenhorn, African American veterans struggled more than other veterans with a return to civilian life and unemployment on the basis of their race.

Black veterans were much less likely to write memoirs about their experiences. A 1997 paper noted that, of almost 400 such memoirs by participants in the Vietnam War, only seven were by African American veterans (less than 2%):

- GI Diary by David Parks (1968)
- The Courageous and the Proud by Samuel Vance (1970)
- Memphis-Nam-Sweden: The Autobiography of a Black American Exile by Terry Whitmore (1971)
- Just Before the Dawn: A Doctor's Experiences in Vietnam by Fenton Williams (1971)
- A Hero's Welcome: The Conscience of Sergeant James Daly versus the United States Army by James A. Daly (1975)
- Yet Another Voice by Norman A. McDaniel (1975)
- Thoughts about the Vietnam War by Eddie Wright (1984)

Both James A. Daly and Norman A. McDaniel were prisoners of war, publishing their respective memoirs within two years of their releases. Of Daly and Whitmore's respective works, American literature scholar Jeff Loeb noted:

...their overall quality, perspective, and degree of self-reflection should have, in my opinion, long since earned them a place among the very best books about Vietnam by veterans, white or black, as well as having firmly ensconced them in the canon of contemporary African American autobiography. The sad fact is, however, that not only are these books barely mentioned in critical works but both were allowed to go out of print, though Whitmore's has recently been reissued.

According to Daniel Lucks, African American soldiers hold a "nightmarish remembrance of the war." New York Times correspondent Thomas A. Jackson reported that “Bitterness and disappointment in America [were] typical of Negro veterans". A 1981 survey by the House Committee on Veterans Affairs found that only 20% of African Americans thought of their time as positive. After the Vietnam War, the number of African American officers in key positions throughout the armed forces rose.

== Awards and recognition ==
It has been investigated whether or not Black troops are less likely to be nominated for a Medal of Honor than White troops; out of 3,500 recipients, only 92 have been Black men. As of 2023, the most recent Black Medal of Honor recipient from the Vietnam War was Paris Davis, who received his Medal on 3 March 2023. Twenty-three Black men have received the Medal of Honor for actions undertaken during the Vietnam War:

- Webster Anderson
- Eugene Ashley Jr., Killed in Action
- William Maud Bryant, Killed in Action
- Paris Davis
- Lawrence Joel
- Dwight H. Johnson
- Garfield M. Langhorn, Killed in Action
- Matthew Leonard, Killed in Action
- Donald Russell Long, Killed in Action
- Melvin Morris
- Milton L. Olive III, Killed in Action; the first African American Medal of Honor recipient of the Vietnam War
- Riley Pitts, Killed in Action
- Charles C. Rogers
- Ruppert L. Sargent, Killed in Action
- Clarence E. Sasser
- Clifford Chester Sims, Killed in Action
- John E. Warren Jr., Killed in Action
- James Anderson Jr., Killed in Action
- Oscar P. Austin, Killed in Action
- John L. Canley
- Rodney Maxwell Davis, Killed in Action
- Robert H. Jenkins Jr., Killed in Action
- Ralph H. Johnson, Killed in Action

== See also ==
- African Americans in the Revolutionary War
- Buffalo Soldier
- Da 5 Bloods
- Military history of African Americans
- Military history of African Americans in the American Civil War
- The Anderson Platoon
