= Husayn Muruwwa =

Lebanese communist author and ex-ayatollah (c.1909–1987)

Doctor Husayn Muruwwa
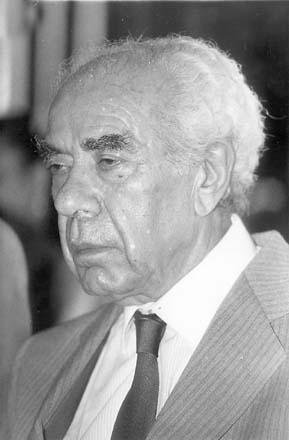
- Born: حسين مروة; 1908 or 1910; Haddatha, Lebanon
- Died: February 17, 1987 (aged 78–79); Beirut, Lebanon
- Cause of death: Assassination by gunshot

Education
- Education: Najaf Seminary, Moscow State University

Philosophical work
- Era: 20th century
- Region: Arab world
- Main interests: Islamic philosophy, Marxism
- Notable works: Materialist Tendencies in Arabic-Islamic Philosophy

Husayn Muruwwa (also spelt Hussein Mroue or Mroueh; Arabic: حسين مروة) (c. 1909 – 17 February 1987) was a Lebanese Marxist philosopher, journalist, author, and literary critic. His longest and most famous work, "Materialist Tendencies in Arabic-Islamic Philosophy" (2 vols., 1979), was a Marxist interpretation of traditional Arab texts. Muruwwa was born in Haddatha, a small village in Lebanon, studied in Iraq, taught in Syria, completed his higher education in the USSR, and was martyred in Lebanon. Up to his adulthood, he was groomed to be a sheikh like many generations of men before him, but after years, even decades, of intellectual reconciliation, he converted to Marxism which led to his expulsion from Iraq. He spent the second half of his life in between Beirut and Moscow. In Beirut he published books and wrote hundreds of articles for newspapers and magazines on numerous issues from a Marxist point of view. Muruwwa completed his doctoral thesis in Moscow. He also played a key role in the Lebanese Communist Party (LCP) and many of its administrative branches. However, due to his revolutionary activity, he was assassinated in his house in Beirut on 17 February 1987 during the Lebanese Civil War.

== Life ==
=== Childhood ===
According to the Lebanese population registers, the date of birth of Husayn Muruwwa is 1920. However, his father wrote that his actual date of birth was 1326 AH, which would mean that he was born in 1908 AD. He was born in the southern Lebanese village of Haddatha, which was at the time part of the Ottoman Empire. His father, Ali Muruwwa, had settled there after returning from his education in Najaf (modern-day Iraq). Coming from a longer line of religious scholars, combined with his work ethic in cultivating the land he acquired, he earned a good reputation as a sheikh amongst the villagers of Haddatha. His mother, referred to as Om Husayn, ("Husayn's mother" in Arabic) was a kind woman, who despite having Husayn as her only child, raised him strictly just like her husband, who brought up Husayn in the hope that he would succeed him in his work as a religious cleric. Husayn described his father's upbringing as depriving him of his childhood; he was forced to wear the traditional robe of a Shi'i scholar (black robes and a turban) at the age of eight, which his classmates constantly ridiculed him for. Before receiving his elementary education in the public school of Haddatha where he learned how to read and write, Husayn studied the Qu'ran for three months. Ali Muruwwa died when Husayn was 12 and Om Husayn died in his arms when Husayn was 20.

=== Education in Najaf ===
After Ali Muruwwa’s death, which left the family in financial ruin, Husayn's hopes of pursuing his religious studies in Najaf seemed non-existent. But eventually, in 1924, at the age of 16, following the intervention of Shaykh ‘Abd al-Husayn Sharraf al-Din, and the help of Muruwwa's cousin Ahmad, enough money was gathered from family members to send Muruwwa to study in Iraq. On his trip to Najaf, Muruwwa recalled his first visit to Beirut at the time. After that, he stayed in a hotel in Damascus near the Sanjakdar Mosque, then he headed to Baghdad where he spent 2 weeks after which he finally arrived in Najaf. His education in there was cut short when his professor sheykh Ali Al Zein, whom he deeply admired, had to return to Lebanon due to illness. After that, he headed to Badkoobeh School where he met up with 2 of his fellow students from Bint Jbeil and stayed with Sheykh Muhammad Al Kanji whom Muruwwa described as having changed the course of his entire life. One of these changes was a sudden realization that he was unwillingly thrown into a series of conflicts he wasn't prepared for; the other was his participation in a weekly book auction which led him to purchase a collection of works and poems (Arabic: ديوان) belonging to 19th-century Iraqi poet Ibrahim Al Tabtaba'ee. However, when he was seen reading the book by his colleagues and professors, Muruwwa was met with harsh criticism and resistance. Despite this, his interest in literature deepened, and the more it deepened, the more he was shamed for it. Also around this time, Muruwwa was acquainted with many ideas that conflicted with his teachings such as Marxism, atheism, and Darwinism introduced to him by authors such as Taha Husayn and Shibli al-Shumayyil. These ideas sowed the first seeds of doubt within his worldview which is when he started to wear white clothing in the summer instead of the required yellow clothing. He famously noted about this period that: "In Najaf, Marx entered my life." What is more, a year after arriving in Najaf, on one of his short visits to Bint Jbeil, he met and expressed his love for his future wife, Fatima Bazzi. On top of that, during this period he also expressed public support for the controversial al-Shabiba al-‘Amiliyya al-Najafiyya (the Najafi-‘Amili Youth), which even further alienated him from his peers. All of this combined with his rough mental state developed into another internal conflict, but rather than being based on his studies, this conflict challenged and shook his entire belief system to its core. He was chosen to take part in a campaign to diminish the influence of the Protestant church in Al-Amarah (Damascus) by running a library in the area. He took his new job as an opportunity to cope with his struggles. However, not long after, he was fired from this job for "spreading heresy and atheism across the student body". This devastated him, and shortly after his return to Baghdad, he planned to end his studies. He started teaching in several schools, first in Baghdad and Damascus, then back in Lebanon where he married his wife Fatima Bazzi in 1929, but after due consideration and persuasion from his peers in addition to receiving financial support from family in Argentina, he decided to commence his studies in 1934 and after 4 gruelling years, he completed his education in 1938, officially becoming a mujtahid.

=== Political Activities and Expulsion from Iraq ===
Shortly after completing his education, he removed his religious garb, started teaching Arabic literature in Baghdad, and expressed interest in Marxist ideas after being lent The Communist Manifesto and The State and Revolution by Husayn Muhammad Al-Shabibi, who was one of the founders of the Iraqi Communist Party (ICP). However, Muruwwa's proper transition into communist thought began in 1948 after observing the essential role of the ICP in the success of the Al-Wathbah uprising which was an uprising against the Portsmouth Treaty in Iraq. During these protests, Muruwwa wrote in the newspaper Al-Ra'iy Al-'am about the martyrs of the uprising, which for him was the tipping point to his proper transition to communism. During this time he read Stalin's Dialectical and Historical Materialism and taught in a Jewish high school where one student described Muruwwa as a "progressive gentleman who showed no ethnic discrimination" who was "a nationalist who hated the British influence in Iraq". However, one year after the success of Al-Wathbah uprising, the pro-British government in Iraq took back power and executed many members and associates of the ICP (including the aforementioned Husayn Muhammad Al-Shabibi who was hanged), consequently, Muruwwa was expelled from Iraq and stripped of his nationality.

=== Political Activities in Lebanon ===
With help from the Lebanese ambassador in Iraq, Muruwwa returned to Lebanon in 1951 where he found a job as a writer at the magazine Al-Hayat, and later with assistance from Muhammad Dakroub and Faraj Allah Al-Hilo, Muruwwa launched the newspaper Al-Thaqafah al-Wataniyyah (Arabic: الثقافة الوطنية) which was sold around the Arab world and sold thousands of copies in Cairo alone. After launching the newspaper, he formally became a member of the Lebanese Communist Party (LCP), and later, a partisan of peace (a movement in collaboration with the World Peace Council). For 7 years Muruwwa wrote regularly for both Al-Hauat and Al-Thaqafah al-Wataniyyah until 1957, when he quit his job at Al-Hayat after the assassination of Nasib Al Matni. Although essential, Muruwwa's work in the LCP was mostly intellectual and relating to the partisans of peace so he rarely took part in administrative issues.

=== Political Activities and Studies in the USSR ===
In December 1954, Muruwwa attended the Second Congress of Soviet Writers in Moscow as a representative of the Lebanese branch of the Arab Writers’ Association. This was his first trip to the USSR and it deeply resonated with him: he remarked that the relationship between the people and literature that he had witnessed there constituted “a unique interaction unprecedented in the history of humanity”, he was struck by how Soviet writers were “of the people” and therefore their essential style was that of socialist realism. In 1968 he would visit Moscow again, but this time he would begin work on his doctoral thesis, an accumulation of decades worth of knowledge, a historical materialist interpretation of Arabic-Islamic heritage. He returned to Moscow again in 1971 with his wife and spent 3 more years finishing up his thesis in the USSR which he would complete in 1974. Muhruwwa's work on his thesis would ultimately develop into his most famous work, what he described as his magnum opus, the 2-volume book entitled Materialist Tendencies in Arabic-Islamic Philosophy (Arabic: النزعات المادية في الفلسفة العربية الإسلامية).

=== Activities during the Lebanese Civil War ===
Like most Lebanese-Marxist intellectuals at the time, Muruwwa remained in Beirut throughout the Lebanese Civil War (1975-1990). At the time, the LCP was allied with Kamal Jumblatt's Lebanese National Movement which made it a target of other factions. Despite this, Muruwwa continued writing even in the harshest circumstances and conditions in the LCP-owned newspaper Al Nida. Additionally, in the early 80s Muruwwah played a key role in establishing the Lebanese National Resistance Front following the Israeli invasion in 1982 which until Hezbollah was the only armed resistance group to Israel.

=== Death ===
On 17 February 1987, two well-dressed, armed men knocked on Muruwwa’s door to which his wife answered; she was told they had important news from the LCP. She reluctantly told them he was ill in bed and led them to his room where one of the men sat him up, put a silenced pistol to his head, and shot; Muruwwa died instantly. The men fled and were never charged. Prior to and after his assassination, over 40 other members of the LCP were also killed in similar conditions.

== Thought ==
Throughout his eventful life, Husayn Muruwwa contributed extensively to the intellectual thought of the Arab world. Particularly his Materialist Tendencies in Arabic-Islamic Philosophy has been influential in studying the early days of Islam in a materialist way. Mirroring his life story, he draws both on his education in Najaf as well as on his adoption of Marxist thought.

=== Colonialism and Revolution ===
Muruwwa's background in Jabal Amil, the very landscape of which was shaped by resistance and occupation, as well as his time in Iraq, shaped his perspective on colonialism and independence. Like many scholars of his time, he was influenced by the July 14 Revolution in Iraq and the Algerian Revolution of the late 1950s and early '60s, which he supported in their pursuit of national independence and democratic freedom.

=== Thoughts on Islamic History ===
Muruwwa argues that the genesis of Islam has to be seen in the sociopolitical developments of the Arabian Peninsula during the period of Muhammad's revelation. In doing so, he moves away from an, in his eyes, idealistic presentation of Islam as portrayed by the traditional ulama. He is, however, also critical of orientalist scholarship in that he rejects the notion that Islam is solely emerging from Christian and Jewish thought. He argues that looking for the origins of Islam is a flawed pursuit that will lead to nowhere. He argues that Islam was not the victory of "one man against all odds," but also that the Islamic event is not merely the accumulation of historical developments. Instead, he places the revelation of the prophet within the context of a broader development of tribes in the Peninsula that unified against the settled elites, particularly the Quraish, as well as the prevalence of Hanifs in the formulation of monotheism that lay at the foundation of Islamic tawhid.

=== New Realism ===
Being a writer at heart, Muruwwa saw literature as an important vehicle for social change. Therein, he was influenced by trends within Socialist Realism, particularly the reformation of that literary school after the second congress of the Union of Soviet Writers in 1954. This congress moved away from the realism of the Soviet Union under Stalin which has been described as a "practice of manufacturing a surrogate reality" that valorized Soviet developments. Rather, the participants of the second congress sought to more accurately depict the reality of divergent peoples in the Soviet world, taking into account the difficulties of their lived experiences. Informed by this development in Socialist realism, Muruwwa developed his concept of "New Realism" (Ar. al-waqi'iyya al-jadida) that was based on both Arab and European thinkers and sought a continuity of realist thought within the Arab literary tradition. Socialist Realism, according to Muruwwa, was only applicable in a socialist society whereas his New Realism allowed for the incorporation of thinkers that were not explicitly socialist, yet did reflect its principles.

== Work ==
=== Writings ===
- Ma’a Al-Qafilah (مع القافلة) 1952. Translates to "With the Caravan" and is a collection of some of Muruwwa's articles in the Al-Hayat magazine.
- Literary Issues (قضايا أدبية)1956.
- The Iraqi Revolution (الثورة العراقية) 1958.
- Critical Studies in Light of Realistic Methodology (دراسات نقدية في ضوء المنهج الواقعي) 1965.
- Materialist Tendencies in Arabic-Islamic Philosophy (النزعات المادية في الفلسفة العربية الإسلامية) 1978. In these two volumes, rather than using the traditional religious, idealistic lens that was used to interpret these texts for a thousand years, he portrayed these early Islamic and Arab traditional texts from a purely scientific, dialectical and historical materialistic Marxist point of view by highlighting the trends in the early golden age Islamic societies, that could be considered by today's standards, Marxist. Here are some comments on the book:
  - "The book contains a dizzying array of information and analysis that display not only Muruwwah’s immense knowledge of turath but also his detailed familiarity with the contributions Soviet orientalists made to the study of early Islamic history."
  - "The book introduces a method of dealing with the Arab and Islamic heritage that adopts a scientific methodology that is still taking its first steps to the Arab library by other Arab authors, revealing what progressive values and material tendencies were found in that philosophical heritage while defining the stages of Arab thought."
- Studies in Islam (دراسات في الاسلام) 1980.
- On Heritage and Shariʿah (في التراث و الشريعة) 1984.
- Our Heritage, How we Know it (تراثنا... كيف نعرفه) 1985.
- Born a Sheykh, I'll Die a Child: Autobiography in a discussion with Abbas Baydoun (ولدت شيخاً وأموت طفلاً: سيرة ذاتية في حديث اجراه مع عباس بيضون) 1990.
- Studies in Thought and Literature (دراسات في الفكر والأدب) 1993.

== Family ==
With his wife Fatima Bazzi, Muruwwa had nine children and thirty grandchildren, many of whom have worked in similar fields ranging from the arts, such as music, theatre and film (see Rabih Muruwwa and Nizar Muruwwah), to the sciences such as math and physics.

== Awards ==
- In 1980, Muruwwa won the Lotus Prize for Literature which was a literary award presented annually to African and Asian authors by the Afro-Asian Writers' Association, also known as Association of Asian and African Writers.

== Main Source ==
- Born a Sheykh, I'll Die a Child: Autobiography in a discussion with Abbas Baydoun (ولدت شيخاً وأموت طفلاً: سيرة ذاتية في حديث اجراه مع عباس بيضون) 1990. https://bostan-ekotob.com/bostan/18/801.pdf
