= Wafa =

Palestinian state-run official news agency

Palestinian News & Information Agency
- وكالة الأنباء الفلسطينية
- Abbreviation: WAFA
- Formation: April 1972; 54 years ago
- Founder: Ziyad Abdel Fattah
- Type: News agency
- Headquarters: Ramallah, West Bank, Palestine
- Region served: Worldwide
- Products: Wire service, news, photos, videos
- Official language: Arabic, Hebrew, English, French
- Key people: Ahmad Assaf (Chairman), Khuloud Assaf (Editor-in-Chief)
- Parent organization: Palestinian National Authority
- Staff: 260
- Website: english.wafa.ps

Wafa (Arabic: وفا, lit. 'trust', an acronym of وكالة الأنباء الفلسطينية, Wikalat al-Anba al-Filastiniya, 'Palestinian News Agency'), also referred to in English as the Palestine News Agency and the Palestinian News & Info Agency, is the official state-run news agency of the Palestinian National Authority (PNA). Before the formation of the PNA in 1994, Wafa was the official news agency of the Palestine Liberation Organization.

Wafa, like the PNA's other media outlets, are considered to be aligned with Fatah.

Wafa provides daily news from Palestine, Israel and the Middle East, and is available in English, Arabic, French and Hebrew.

== History ==
=== Early years (1972–1994) ===
Following a decision at the Palestinian National Council's special session in Cairo in April 1972, the Executive Committee of the Palestine Liberation Organization announced the establishment of Wafa as the official news agency of the Palestinians, based in Beirut on June 5, 1972. While initially Wafa focused on publishing "the official version of news about Palestinian affairs," especially military statements of its revolutionary leadership, Wafa's work gradually expanded. It began issuing felasteen el-thawra (meaning "Palestinian revolution"), a weekly magazine headed by Ahmed Abdel-Rahman.

During PLO's presence in Lebanon, Wafa was frequently quoted by foreign correspondents and news agencies. According to Kenneth R. Timmerman, writing for Commentary, Wafa was instrumental in shaping the Western narrative of the 1982 Lebanon War:

The information supplied by WAFA on the number of victims and their category - civilian or military - provided the basis for the dispatches leaving West Beirut, in the absence of other sources. The "Lebanese police" so often quoted in this context had ceased to function in West Beirut early in the siege. With deadlines to meet and under the risk of falling bombs, most journalists were content with what they got. This, then, was one source of the wild exaggeration in the figures of civilian dead reported throughout the war and especially during the siege of Beirut. ... First there was the press pass issued by WAFA with the bearer's photograph, a duplicate of which remained in WAFA's offices. Without this pass, no journalist could hope to circulate in West Beirut; caught photographing, or taking notes, he would be immediately arrested if not shot on sight.

Following the PLO's ouster from Lebanon during the 1982 Lebanon War, Wafa resumed its activities in Cyprus and Tunis from November 1982.

=== Under the PA (1994–2005) ===
As a consequence of the Oslo Accords in 1994, the PLO's media institutions transferred to the aegis of the Palestinian Authority. Wafa opened offices in Gaza City and Ramallah.

=== Under Mahmoud Abbas (2004–present) ===
In April 2005, Mahmoud Abbas transferred the PNA's media assets, including Wafa, to the Palestinian Ministry of Information under Nabil Shaath. At the same time, he merged the General Information Commission into Wafa. Wafa was previously under the PA presidency and the PLO Executive Committee. Palestinian journalists had complained about the PNA's strict control over official media outlets, and the move was seen as an attempt to improve the official media's independence.

Hamas won the 2006 Palestinian legislative election and to preempt Hamas from asserting control of the media assets, Abbas transferred them back to the presidential office.

In September 2006, gunmen stormed Wafa's offices in Khan Younis and smashed equipment and beat up one reporter.

In 2015, Abbas appointed Khoulud Asaf as the new head of WAFA, the first female head of the organization. The president of the PA appoints WAFA's head, and the organization is viewed an arm of the Palestinian government, rather than an independent agency that criticizes the Palestinian government.

On December 10, 2018, Israeli soldiers raided Wafa's offices in Ramallah and fired tear gas into the building as part of a manhunt for gunmen involved in a December 9 attack that wounded seven Israeli civilians. The Palestinian Journalists' Union, the Palestinian Foreign Ministry, the Organisation of Islamic Cooperation, and the International Federation of Journalists condemned the Israeli action.

In 2019, Wafa won the Federation of Arab News Agencies award for best report, a regional organization of national news agencies in the Arab World.

== Foreign language editions ==
In October 2005, Wafa re-launched its French service. The French service had previously operated in Tunisia until 1994.

In 2009, Wafa launched a Hebrew version of its website; the content of this service would also focus on Arab citizens of Israel. It also started mailing a daily newsletter to Israeli members of the Knesset and Hebrew media outlets. Wafa ceased its Hebrew service in 2016.

In 2022, Wafa relaunched its Hebrew service in order to "convey the Palestinian point of view to Israeli society", according to Wafa's editor-in-chief.

== See also ==
- Palestinian Information Center
- Ma'an News Agency
- Federation of Arab News Agencies (FANA)
