= Samih al-Qasim =

Palestinian Druze poet (1939–2014)

Samīħ al-Qāsim
- سميح القاسم
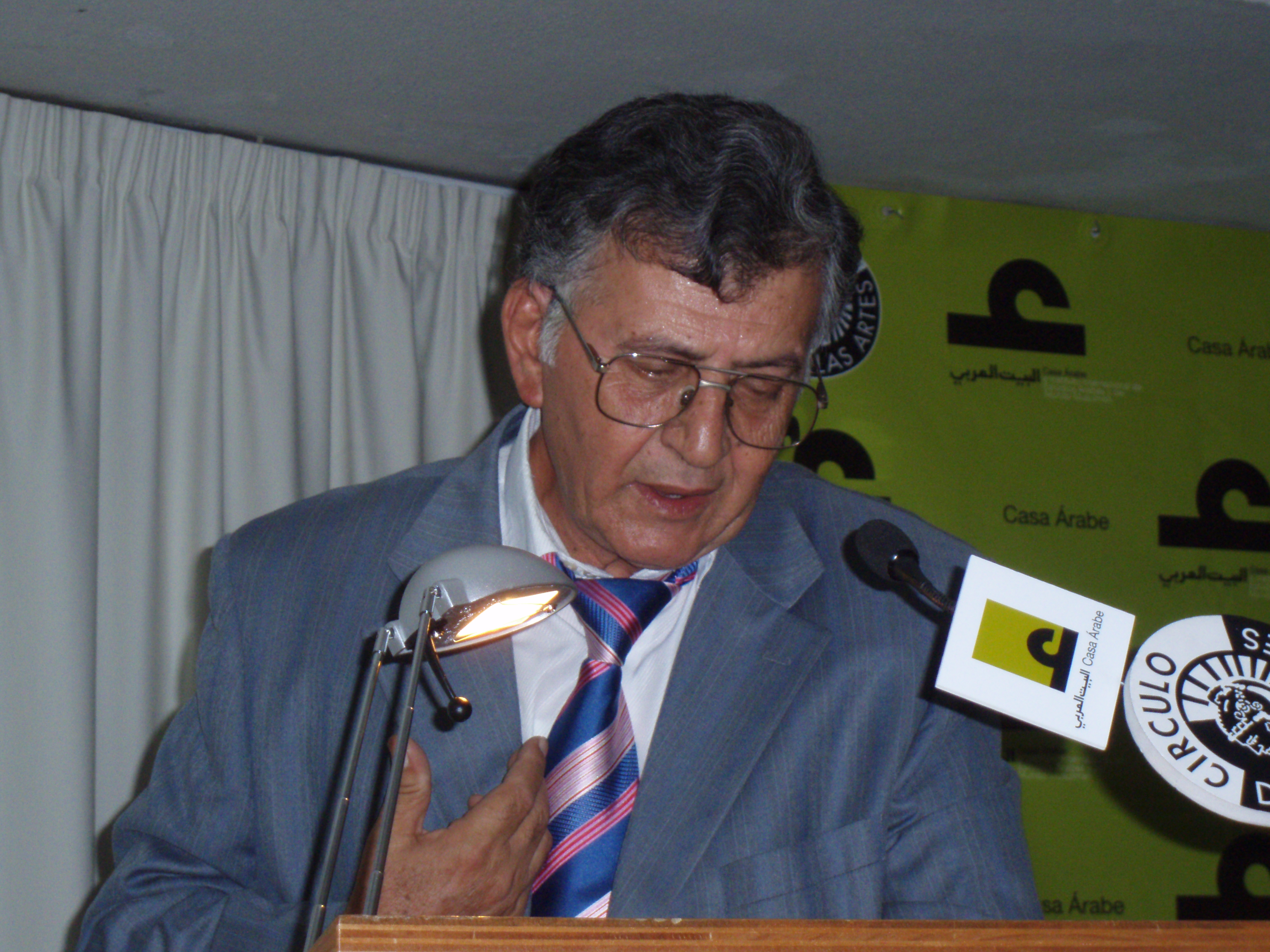
- Samīħ al-Qāsim in Madrid
- Born: May 11, 1939; Zarqa, Emirate of Transjordan (now Jordan)
- Died: August 19, 2014 (aged 75); Safed, Israel
- Occupations: Poet and writer
- Writing career
- Period: 1958-2014
- Genres: Nationalist, tragedy

Samīħ al-Qāsim al Kaissy (Arabic: سميح القاسم; Hebrew: סמיח אל קאסם; 1939 – August 19, 2014) was a Palestinian poet with Israeli citizenship whose work is well known throughout the Arab world. He was born in Transjordan and later lived in Mandatory Palestine and Israel. Before the Six-Day War in 1967, he was mainly influenced by Arab nationalism; after the war he joined the Israeli Communist Party.

== Early life ==
Al-Qasim was born in 1939 to a Druze family in the Emirate of Transjordan (now Jordan), in the northern city of Zarqa, while his father served in the Arab Legion of King Abdullah. He came from a Druze family from the town of Rameh in the Upper Galilee. Al-Qasim attended primary school there and then later graduated from secondary school in Nazareth. His family did not flee Rameh during the 1948 Palestinian expulsion and flight (Nakba), which occurred in the midst of the invasion of multiple Arab armies aiming to defend the fleeing Palestinians. In his book About Principles and Art, he explains:

While I was still at primary school the Palestinian tragedy occurred. I regard that date as the date of my birth, because the first images I can remember are of the 1948 events. My thoughts and images spring from the number 48.

== Professional career ==
Al-Qasim starts his professional career as a government teacher at primary schools in Galilee and al-Karmel. He was dismissed by the Israeli Education Minister due to his activism for the Palestinian people. He would go on to work odd after his dismissal. He would go on to become a journalist in the 1960s. Al-Qasim would eventually join al-Ittihad, a Communist Party influenced daily newspaper. Al-Qasim will go on to become an elected member of the party's central committee. Al-Qasim would later work for the Communist Party published magazine, al-Jadid, in the early 1970s. He would later leave the magazine due to a dispute with the Communist Party leadership on its attitude towards Mikhail Grobachev led Soviet Union.

== Life as a poet and journalist ==
Al-Qasim would begin composing poetry early in life. His first publication of poems, Peagents of the Sun, was published when he was nineteen years old. By 1984, al-Qasim had written twenty-four volumes of nationalist poetry and published six collections of poems. His poems in general are relatively short, some being no more than just two verses. Some of his famous poems include:

- Slit Lips
- Sons of War
- Confession at Midday
- Travel Tickets
- Bats
- Abandoning
- The Story of a City
- Conversation between Ear of Corn and Jerusalem Rose Thorn
- How I became an Article
- Story of the Unknown Man
- End of a Discussion with a Jailer
- The Will of a Man Dying in Exile
- The Boring Orbit
- The Clock on the Wall

Al-Qasim contributed to the journals of Al-Ittihad, Al-Jadid, Index and others. He was among the regular contributors of the Lotus magazine of the Afro-Asian Writers Association.

He claimed that the pan-Arab ideology of Nasserism impressed him during the nationalist post-1948 era. Most of his poetry relates to the change of life before and after the Nakba, the Palestinian and broader Arab struggle to free their lands from foreign influence, Arab nationalism, and various Arab tragedies. In 1968, he published his first collection of poetry, Waiting for the Thunderbird. Al-Qasim wrote about these subjects while they were at the climax of their popularity among the Arab population in the later half of the 20th century. When asked by his Iraqi friend, poet Buland al-Haidari if he had visited Baghdad, he replied by saying he did not have to, since he views any Arab city as equal to his own Arab residence.

== Political influence ==
Al-Qasim claimed that the pan-Arab ideology of Nasserism impressed him during the nationalist post-1948 era. He was jailed several times for his political activities that involved advocacy for Palestinian rights and dissent against government policies, starting in 1960 for refusal to enlist in the Israeli army which is required of Israeli Druze. He was held under house arrest from 1963 until 1968. He joined the Israeli Communist party Hadash in 1967 and was detained along with other members of the party at the outbreak of the Six-Day War. He was sent to al-Damoun prison (official name: Damon Prison) in Haifa. During this time, he virtually lost his nationalistic emotions upon hearing Israeli radio announcing its territorial gains after their victory.

== Life in Israel ==
Al-Qasim worked as a journalist in Haifa where he ran the Arabesque Press and the Folk Arts Centre and was the editor-in-chief of the Israeli Arab newspaper Kul al-Arab. He would recite many of his poems to large audiences at monthly gatherings in the Arab towns and cities of the Galilee. Al-Qasim refused to leave Israel; in an interview with Index he is quoted as saying "I have chosen to remain in my own country not because I love myself less, but because I love my country more".

Al-Qasim visited Syria in 1997 and in 2000. He was prevented by Israeli authorities from leaving to Lebanon for a poetry event in 2001.

== Death ==
Al-Qasim died on August 19, 2014 in Safed Hospital, after a long battle with cancer. His funeral was held on August 21, 2014, in Rameh where it was attended by thousands.
