= Ziyad Abdel Fattah =

Palestinian politician and writer

- زياد عبد الفتاح
- Born: Ziyad Jamil Abdel Fattah زياد جميل عبد الفتاح; March 3, 1939 (age 87); Tulkarm, Tulkarm Subdistrict, Mandatory Palestine
- Education: Al-Fadiliya School
- Occupations: politician, writer, journalist and novelist
- Title: Founder and President of the Palestinian News Agency (Wafa)
- Term: June 5, 1972 – May 26, 2005
- Movement: Fatah movement
- Honours: Order of Palestine for Culture, Science and Arts (2020)
- Website: http://ziadabdelfattah.net/arabic/

Ziyad Jamil Abdel Fattah (Arabic: زياد جميل عبد الفتاح; born March 3, 1939) is a Palestinian politician, writer, journalist and novelist, born in Tulkarm, Palestine. He is one of the leaders of the Fatah movement, founder of the Palestinian News Agency, a member of the Palestinian National Council in the Palestine Liberation Organization for several sessions, and the former president of Federation of Arab News Agencies (FANA), the Palestinian General Authority for Consultations, and the Palestinian National Library. Abdel Fattah was very close to late president Yasser Arafat, and he witnessed all the events on his side. Abdel Fattah has been dubbed "the legend of the Palestinian revolution media."

== Personal life ==
Ziyad Jamil Abdel Fattah was born in the city of Tulkarm in the West Bank on March 3, 1939. he received his primary, preparatory and secondary education in the schools of his city, Tulkarm, and finished high school in the ancient Al-Fadhilia school in the city. He obtained a diploma in education and psychology, and worked as a teacher for three years in a number of schools. Later on, he moved to Kuwait where he worked as a teacher for five years, and the Fatah movement emerged in that period. Abdel Fattah joined the movement, and the Palestinian leadership asked him in the year 1968 to go to Egypt to establish "al-Asifah Radio" in Cairo.

During working in Cairo, Ziyad joined Ain Shams University with to major in law, where he graduated and obtained a university degree later in 1975. In 1971 he founded Daraa Radio in Syria, nine months later he moved to Beirut, where he established the Palestinian News Agency ''Wafa'' in the year 1972, and took charge of leading it according to a decision issued by the Palestine Liberation Organization on June 5, 1972. He was also the editor-in-chief of the "Palestine Revolution magazine", which is the central magazine of the Palestine Liberation Organization. In 1974, he became the head of the Palestinian media team in New York City, where he accompanied Yasser Arafat to the United Nations General Assembly, and in 1978 he headed the Union of Arab News Agencies. In 1982, he established "Al-Maaraka" newspaper in Beirut during war and he escaped death in more than one accident. After that, he left with President Yasser Arafat to Tunisia, and there he continued to head al-Wafa News Agency until the signing of the Oslo Agreement, he then returned to Palestine in 1994. Later on President Yasser Arafat assigned him again to head al-Wafa Agency after arriving to his homeland and establishing the Palestinian National Authority. On February 12, 1996 a presidential decree was issued by President Yasser Arafat to establish the Palestinian Information Service, and Abdel Fattah was assigned to lead it as its first president in addition to his duties in al-Wafa. In 1997 a presidential decree was issued to establish the Palestinian National Library, and Abdel Fattah was also its first president. He was also the editor-in-chief of "Ruya Magazine", which is concerned with the Palestinian issue, issued in 2000 by the State Information Service. On May 26, 2005, he ended his chairmanship of the Palestinian News Agency and the Palestinian Information Authority.

Abdel Fattah participated in a large number of international and cultural conferences, including the Cairo International Book Fair. In addition, he visited most countries of the world during his literary and media work. He also served as editor-in-chief of the literary magazine Lotus speaking on behalf of the Asia and Africa Writers Union for five years. He is one of the founders of the General Union of Palestinian Writers and Journalists, and a member of the General Secretariat of the Union of Arab Journalists.

== Works ==
- A Private Communiqué of an Ordinary Man (original title: Balaagh Khas li Ahad al-Rijal al-Adeyin) a collection of stories, issued in 1976.
- Moon on Beirut (original title: Qamar Ala Beirut) a collection of short stories, 1982, published by Dar Al-Awda.
- A Black Cat in the Last Street (original title: Qetta Sawdaa fi al-Share' al-Akheer) published in 1984.
- White Teeth (original title: al-Asnan al-Baydaa) issued in 1986.
- Farewell Maryam (original title: Wadaan Maryam) issued on January 1, 1992, by Ibn Rushd Publishing House in Beirut.
- The Crossing (original title: al-Maabar) a novel, published in 2002, by Dar Al-Hilal Printing Press in Cairo.
- What We Have (original title: Ma Alayna) is a novel, published in 2004 by Dar Al-Hilal in Cairo.
- House of the Army (original title: Dar al-Jaysh) a novel, published in 2010, Cairo.
- Silk Paper (original title: Waraa Hareer) a novel, published in 2014, by Merit Publishing House in Cairo.
- The Sea Gets Angry (al-Bahr Yaghdab) a collection of short stories, 2014, by the Shepherds Publishing House.
- Displaced Villages (original title: al-Qora al-Mohajjara) a book published in 2015.
- Al-Ratno, a novel, was published on December 12, 2017, by Kol Shay Publishing house, in the presence of the Palestinian Minister of Culture Ihab Bseiso, and it is 324 pages long.
- Diamond Polisher (original title: Saqel al-Almas) a book published in 2019, by Kol Shay Publishing House. The book consists of 308 pages. Abdel Fattah revealed information published for the first time about his close friend, the poet Mahmoud Darwish. It is reported that Abdel Fattah wrote all the speeches of President Yasser Arafat accompanied by Mahmoud Darwish.

== Honours ==
On February 25, 2020, Palestinian President Mahmoud Abbas gave him the Order of Culture, Science and Arts in the level of brilliance, one of the highest Palestinian medals, in appreciation of his national, literary and media career. This took place at the Palestinian Presidency "Mukataa" and in the presence of a number of Palestinian leadership.
