= Terry Whitmore =

Black military deserter and resister during the Vietnam War

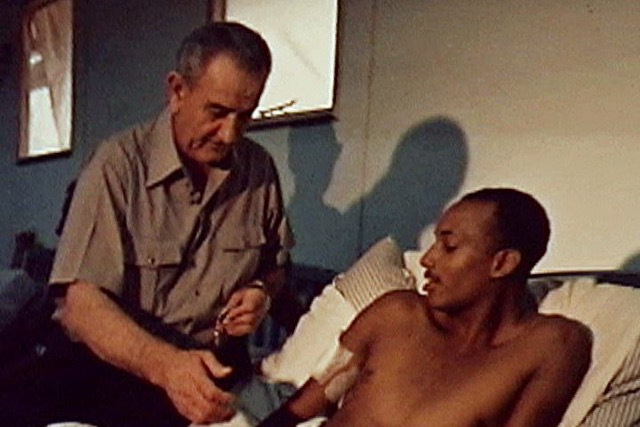
- Terry Whitmore receiving Purple Heart from President Johnson December 23, 1967.
- Born: Terry Marvell Whitmore; March 6, 1947; Memphis, Tennessee
- Died: 11 July 2007 (aged 60); Memphis, Tennessee

Terry Marvell Whitmore (March 6, 1947 – July 11, 2007) was an American soldier, deserter and actor.

A Black Marine, he was one of 503,926 soldiers and sailors who deserted from the United States military during the Vietnam War. He wrote about it in Memphis-Nam-Sweden: The Autobiography of a Black American Exile, one of the few memoirs of that war by a Black author. He also appeared in two documentaries about GI resistance to the war. His autobiography, which was first published in 1971 and republished in 1997, has been called "an important addition to the canons of Viet Nam War literature and…also to that of African American autobiography." In addition to the two documentaries, while in exile he appeared in four Swedish fiction films as an actor.

== Early life ==
Terry Whitmore was born on March 6, 1947 and grew up in Memphis, Tennessee. Writing about this in his memoir, he described a difficult early childhood but never thinking about being Black – "It just doesn't occur to you...because you're around black all the time." As he grew older and had to go "outside the neighborhood": "This is where you really start to feel it," he said of the racism he experienced. "They do hate us. Just plain hate us." He graduated from high school and then enlisted in the Marines in fall of 1966 hoping to find something better. He felt he would have been drafted anyway, so he voluntarily enlisted which allowed him to stay home for one more Christmas.

== Military service ==
After enlisting, Whitmore was sent overseas to fight in Vietnam. He was promised non-combat duty on a ship, but told an interviewer he had been cheated out of this by the Marines. By late 1967, he was a lance corporal operating with his unit near the DMZ (Vietnamese Demilitarized Zone). His memoir describes seeing U.S. troops engaging in atrocities, killing women and children and burning villagers' huts in Quảng Trị Province. Even though he participated in some of these actions with his unit, he believed that some of the North Vietnamese combatants intentionally spared his life, instead shooting the White troops he was with. In a later battle he was severely wounded in action by gunfire and shrapnel near Con Thien. He was transferred to the U.S. military hospital at Cam Ranh Bay where he described being wrapped in bandages from head to foot "like an Egyptian mummy". It soon became clear he needed more advanced treatment so he was sent to Japan for further care.

During his hospitalization, he had lots of time to think about what he had done and about the war in general. Appearing in the film Sir! No Sir!, about the GI resistance to the Vietnam War, he described seeing news coverage of the assassination of Martin Luther King, Jr. and the subsequent riots in numerous cities in the U.S. He talked about seeing tanks and dogs in the streets of Memphis – armed men "wearing the same kind of uniform that I got", occupying his hometown neighborhood where he had a baby daughter. "They're beating up on people." He was struck by the realization that as U.S. soldiers were beating up on people in Vietnam, they were also beating up on Black people at home. As he recovered, he began dating a Japanese woman named Taki who had a photo of Martin Luther King in her apartment and a political cartoon of U.S. President Johnson with the caption "Hey, hey, LBJ, how many kids did you kill today?" The more time he spent with her, and the more questions she asked him, the more difficult it became for him to explain or justify what he was doing. In his memoir, Whitmore credited Taki with opening his eyes. He also wrote, "Nobody can ever tell me that the war in Vietnam is not immoral. It was disgusting and I'm none too proud that I was once a part of killing women and their children when my country was supposed to be there to help them."

While he was recovering, he was told he would not have to return to Vietnam. Once he got well, however, he was ordered back. By this time he felt he couldn't go back to killing the Vietnamese people. With the help of Taki and the Japanese anti-war group Beheiren, he instead traveled across the Soviet Union to Sweden, where he sought asylum. He became one of over 100 Black U.S. GI's who deserted to Sweden during that war – one of nearly 1,000 American war resisters who went to Sweden in those years.

== Controversy ==
There is some historical debate and controversy about Whitmore's account of the massacre he described as taking place in Quảng Trị Province in late 1967. Whitmore described the complete destruction of a large unnamed hamlet consisting of a number of smaller unnamed villages composed of unarmed Vietnamese, men, women and children, including their livestock. Elements of his story, and the approximate timing, match the military records of an investigation, courts martial and murder charges directed at several marines who were eventually acquitted by the military, but no clear evidence has surfaced to confirm (or disprove) his full story or the larger massacre he described. What is clear is that at least six and perhaps as many as a dozen unarmed villagers were killed by U.S. marines in the operation Whitmore probably participated in. In addition, the general area was subjected to intense aerial bombardment and artillery fire, and much of the "ville" itself had been burned by U.S. troops just a few days prior to the reported killings. More, Quảng Trị Province was the most bombed province in South Vietnam with its capital district "saturated with 3,000 bombs per square kilometer". Some of what Whitmore described could have been the results of bombs and other earlier activity. One historian has called Whitmore a liar while acknowledging that the Marine hearing officer during the military investigation stated “The evidence reveals that some horrible acts were committed". Another historian who studied the same events is much more in line with Whitmore's descriptions. Nick Turse, who wrote the award winning Kill Anything That Moves: The Real American War in Vietnam based on secret Pentagon archives and interviews with American veterans and Vietnamese survivors, quoted two separate Marines as saying their orders were to leave nothing alive, "kill everyone in the ville and burn it down."

== Personal life ==
Whitmore married before enlisting and his first child, a daughter, was born while he was overseas. In Sweden, he was married again to a Swedish woman with whom he had two sons. While there, he also joined a basketball team founded by American deserters of the Vietnam War, the Stockholm Stars. In 1977, after President Jimmy Carter signed an executive order granting amnesty to draft evaders of the Vietnam War era, Whitmore returned to the US to meet his daughter for the first time, who was being raised by his mother. In Sweden, he worked for awhile as a script writer for the Swedish Film Institute, and then got more permanent work as a bus driver and a buyer for a large company. Whitmore returned permanently to Memphis in 2001, and died in 2007.

== Works and films ==
Whitmore was one of the few Black Vietnam War veterans to write a memoir about his experience: Memphis-Nam-Sweden: The Autobiography of a Black American Exile, published in 1971 and republished in 1997. He was the subject of the 1970 Swedish documentary Terry Whitmore, for Example, and appeared in the 2005 documentary Sir! No Sir! about the GI resistance to the Vietnam War. He also appeared in four Swedish fiction films as an actor: Deserter USA (1969), The Gladiators (1969), Georgia, Georgia (1972), and The Trap (1975).

== Awards and honors ==
In 1967, he was awarded the Purple Heart by President Lyndon B. Johnson. He was also awarded the Bronze Star Medal.

== See also ==
- Military history of African Americans in the Vietnam War
- A Matter of Conscience
- Brian Willson
- Court-martial of Howard Levy
- Donald W. Duncan
- FTA Show - 1971 anti-Vietnam War road show for GIs
- F.T.A. - documentary film about the FTA Show
- Fort Hood Three
- GI's Against Fascism
- GI Coffeehouses
- Movement for a Democratic Military
- Opposition to United States involvement in the Vietnam War
- Presidio mutiny
- Sir! No Sir!, a documentary about the antiwar movement within the ranks of the United States Armed Forces
- The Spitting Image, a 1998 book by Vietnam veteran and sociology professor Jerry Lembcke which disproves the widely believed narrative that American soldiers were spat upon and insulted by antiwar protesters
- Stop Our Ship (SOS)
- Veterans For Peace
- Vietnam Veterans Against the War
- Waging Peace in Vietnam
- Winter Soldier Investigation
