= Takeshi Kaikō =

Japanese writer

Kaikō Takeshi 開高 健
- Kaikō Takeshi
- Born: 30 December 1930; Tennoji-ku, Osaka, Japan
- Died: 9 December 1989 (aged 58); Chigasaki, Kanagawa, Japan
- Occupations: Writer, journalist
- Writing career
- Genres: Novels, short stories, essays

Takeshi Kaikō (開高 健, Kaikō Takeshi; 30 December 1930 – 9 December 1989), also known as Ken Kaikō, was a Japanese novelist, short-story writer, essayist, literary critic, and television documentary writer. He was distinguished by his knowledge, intellect, sense of humor and conversational skills, and although his style has been criticized as wordy and obtuse, he was one of the more popular Japanese writers in the late Shōwa period.

== Early life ==
Kaikō was born in the Tennoji Ward of Osaka as the son of an elementary school teacher. In 1948, he enrolled in the Law Department of Osaka City University, but was often absent from class, as he had to take a variety of part-time jobs in order to pay for his tuition. While in school, rather than study law he was sidetracked by the works of Motojirō Kajii, Mitsuharu Kaneko and Atsushi Nakajima. He also translated the works of Sherwood Anderson and Louis Aragon into Japanese. He graduated in 1953 and moved to Tokyo, where he took a job with Kotobukiya (the present Suntory), where he worked in the public-relations department.

He married Yōko Maki, a poet.

== Literary career ==
Kaikō published his first work, Na no nai machi (Nameless City, 1953) in the literary magazine Kindai Bungaku soon after his move to Tokyo. It was largely ignored by critics. However, his second work, a short story titled Panniku (Panic, 1957) published in the Shin Nippon Bunkaku, caused a sensation for its unusual concept and style. It was a story about a dedicated forester in a rural prefecture of Japan, who struggles against government incompetence and corruption. Kaikō wrote the story as a satirical allegory comparing human beings to mice.

Kaikō won the prestigious Akutagawa Prize in 1957 with his Hadaka no ōsama (The Naked King), a story critical of the pressures placed on school children by Japan's educational system.

Kaikō is considered a leftist activist, respected in many Indochinese countries, in particular, for his vocal opposition to Japan's support of the United States' policies in Indochina in the 1960s. He was one of the founders of the Beheiren (Betonamu ni heiwa wo! Shimin rengo), or the Citizen's League for Peace in Vietnam. This activity was related to his experience as a war correspondent in Vietnam with the Asahi Shimbun; he was briefly imprisoned by the Viet Cong. These experiences translated into his novel, Kagayakeru yami (Into a Black Sun, 1968), an account of a Japanese journalist experiencing first-hand the life of the Americans and South Vietnamese troops in Vietnam. The novel won the prestigious Mainichi Book Award.

However, Kaikō had a wide range of topics in his repertory. Natsu no yami (Darkness in Summer, 1971) was essentially a romance between a reporter and an expatriate Japanese woman living in Europe.

Kaikō enriched the Japanese language with the word "apache", to denote scavengers of recyclables, described in his novel, Japan's Threepenny Opera.

Considered a gourmet, in his later years, Kaikō wrote numerous essays on food and drink, as well as appearing on food-related or fishing-related TV shows and in TV commercials.

He died of esophageal cancer. His grave is at the Shorei-in sub-temple of the Engaku-ji Temple complex, Kamakura, Kanagawa.

== Legacy ==
His former house in Chigasaki, Kanagawa has been preserved as a memorial museum.

== Bibliography ==
- Japan's Threepenny Opera, 1959.
- English translations
  - Into a Black Sun, (English language edition: Kodansha America (1981). ISBN 0-87011-428-X
  - Five Thousand Runaways Dodd, Mead (1987)
  - Darkness in Summer (with Cecilia Segawa Seigle), Peter Owen (1989). ISBN 0-7206-0725-6
  - Giants and Toys, in: Made in Japan and Other Japanese Business Novels, transl.: Tamae K. Prindle. (1990). ISBN 0-87332-772-1
  - A Certain Voice in: Mother of Dreams and Other Short Stories, ed. by Makoto Ueda
