= Beheiren =

Japanese peace activist group (1965–1974)

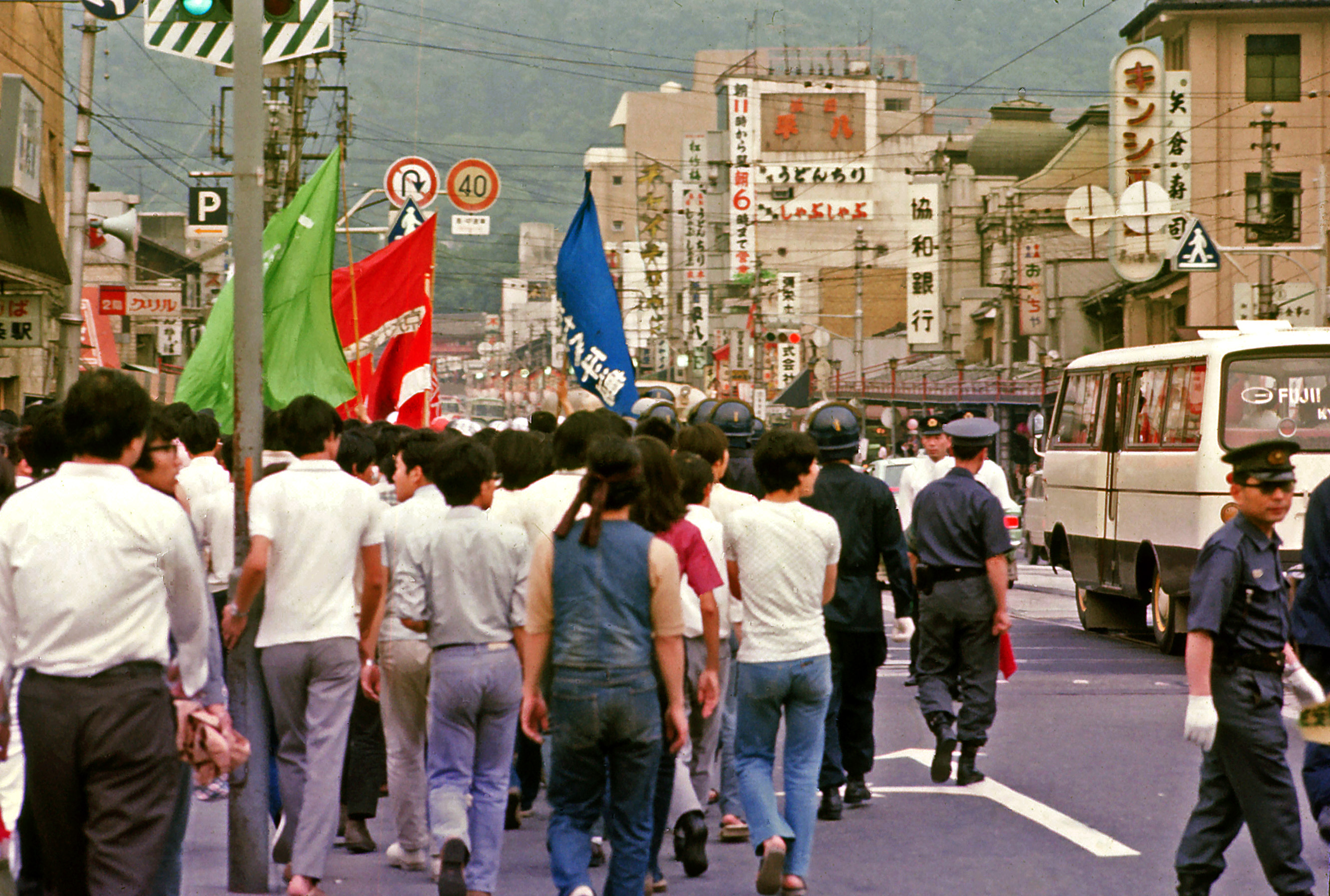
Beheiren at a demonstration in Kyoto, 1971

Beheiren (ベ平連; short for Betonamu ni Heiwa o! Shimin Rengo (ベトナムに平和を！市民連合), lit. "The Citizen's League for Peace in Vietnam") was an antiwar Japanese "New Left" activist group that existed from 1965 to 1974 which protested Japanese assistance to the United States during the Vietnam War.

Beheiren claims to have helped 20 U.S. soldiers to desert, in some cases providing them with false passports and other paperwork and helping them escape to Sweden via the Soviet Union. They also used shareholder activism techniques — buying single shares of Mitsubishi stock so that they could address shareholders meetings about the company's support for the American war effort. The group also assisted American soldiers who were publishing and distributing underground papers and pamphlets in Japan. They helped the Intrepid Four desert and seek asylum in Sweden in 1967 and later helped Terry Whitmore desert in 1968.

Members included Makoto Oda (official spokesperson), Yuichi Yoshikawa (Secretary-General), Michitoshi Takabatake, Osamu Kuno, Amon Miyamoto, Ichiyo Muto, Shinobu Yoshioka, Takeshi Kaiko, Yoshiyuki Tsurumi and Shunsuke Tsurumi.

== History ==
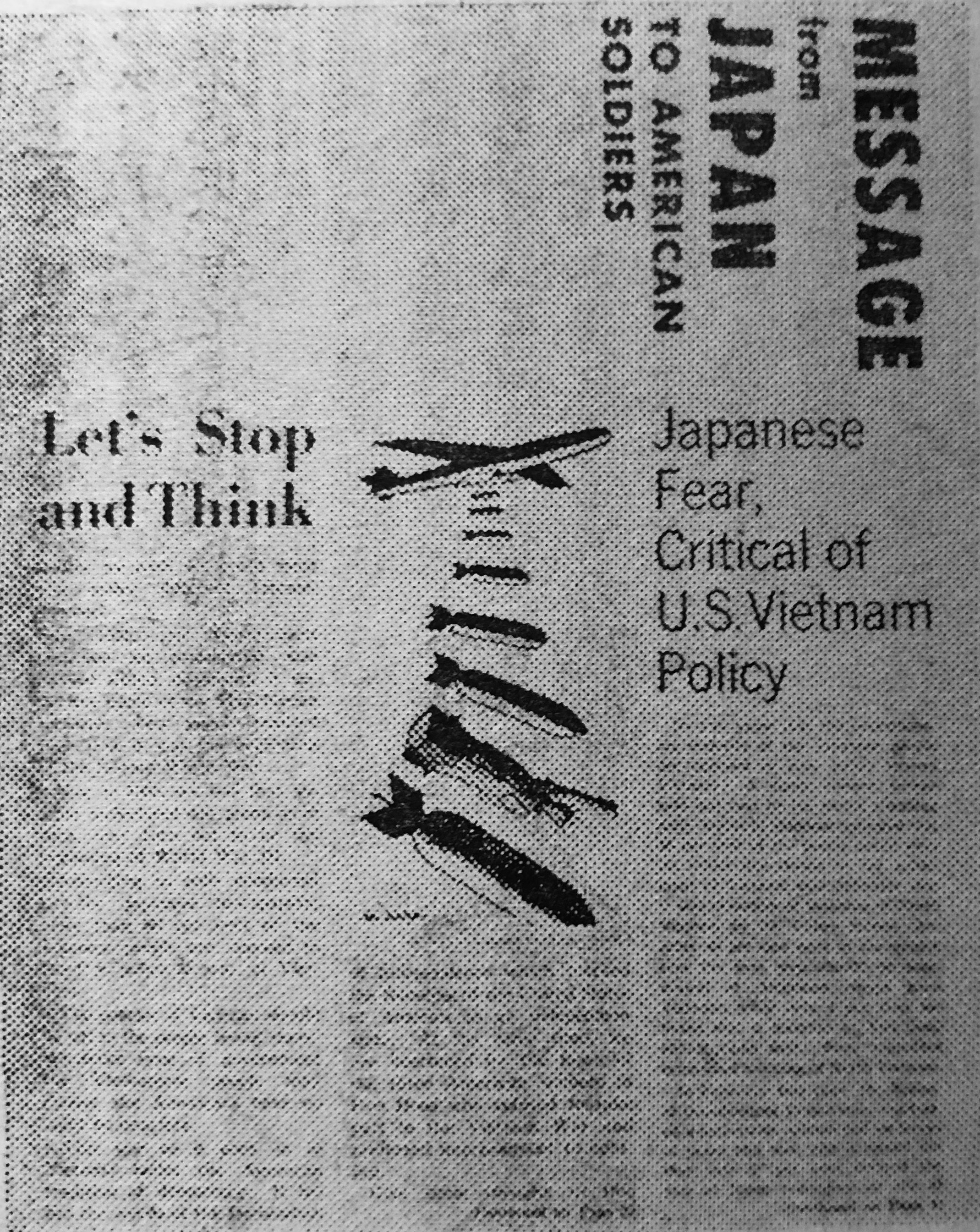
Beheiren pamphlet targeted towards U.S. soldiers

Beheiren was organized with the assistance of the "Science of Thought" research group led by Shunsuke Tsurumi, which sought to create a new type of autonomous Japanese "citizen" (shimin) capable of "spontaneously" organizing to form "grassroots" protest movements without guidance from hierarchical "Old Left" political parties and organizations. As a supposedly "nonideological" organization that "anyone can join," Beheiren grew out of, and was modeled after, the similar "Voiceless Voices Society" (Koe Naki Koe no Kai) that Tsurumi and the Science of Thought group had organized to take part in the 1960 Anpo protests against renewal of the U.S.-Japan Security Treaty. However, historian Simon Avenell has argued that the concept of the autonomous, self-organizing "shimin" was a "myth" that sometimes proved useful for organizing protest movements but rarely if ever reflected the actual structure and organization of such movements.

In March 1965, political scientist Michitoshi Takabatake approached Tsurumi about the possibility of creating a new organization along the lines of the Voiceless Voices to protest against Japan's involvement in the Vietnam War. Tsurumi agreed, and the two approached novelist and travel writer Makoto Oda to become the new group's official spokesperson. Oda agreed, and on April 24, Beheiren was officially established as an offshoot of the existing Voiceless Voices Society.

Oda traveled extensively around Japan and the world to promote national and international movements against the Vietnam War. In particular, he pressed Japanese New Left activists to overcome their consciousness as helpless "victims" (higaisha) of defeat in World War II and recognize their role as "victimizers" (kagaisha) as citizens of a country that was deriving economic benefit from supporting the U.S.-led war in Vietnam.

In 1970, Beheiren took a leading role in organizing large-scale protests against the automatic renewal of the U.S.-Japan Security Treaty, which allowed U.S. troops fighting in Vietnam to be based on Japanese soil. However, these "1970 Anpo protests" failed to prevent automatic renewal, as the government of conservative prime minister Eisaku Satō simply opted to allow the treaty to continue as is.

Beheiren continued its activities until the U.S. announced its withdrawal from South Vietnam in 1974. A final closing ceremony was held in Tokyo on January 26, 1974. In a farewell address, Tsurumi Shunsuke told an audience of around 1,000 activists that although Beheiren was ending, "another day I think Beheiren—although not as Beheiren—will want to make an appearance once again. Beheiren is dissolved. Long live Beheiren!"

== See also ==
- Peace movement
