= Vietnam War resisters in Sweden =

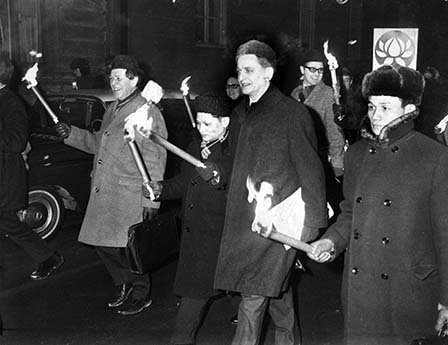
Swedish Prime Minister Olof Palme demonstrates side by side with the North Vietnamese Moscow ambassador Nguyễn Thọ Chân protesting the war in Vietnam.

Vietnam War resisters in Sweden were Americans who fled to Sweden to avoid service in the Vietnam War between 1967 and 1973. Among the roughly 1,000 American exiles were around 800 military deserters and draft dodgers. Unlike other nations like Canada that discreetly harbored Vietnam War resisters, the Swedish government granted war resisters asylum status and the public openly welcomed them. This unique acceptance and Swedish politicians' open protests against American involvement in the Vietnam War caused a rift in relations between Sweden and the United States.

== History ==
During the Vietnam War, 503,926 desertions occurred in the United States military. Most deserted in the United States, but some fled to other countries. During the war American servicemen were often stationed in or took retreats to Japan, and had trouble deserting while there due to the language barrier. Activists from the Japanese leftist group Beheiren devised a way to reach out to servicemen and assist them in deserting. Sweden became the target destination for deserters because it was the only Western country that openly granted asylum to Vietnam War deserters.

Sweden's granting of asylum to deserters worsened relations between Sweden and the United States. In 1969, the United States recalled its ambassador to Sweden in protest.

Of the roughly 1,000 American war resisters who came to Sweden, two-thirds were deserters rather than draft evaders. Very few stayed in Sweden for the rest of their lives, and the few who remained assimilated into Swedish society. Those who remained over the years typically did so because of a distaste for American politics or because of careers and family now in Sweden.

== People ==
=== Deserters ===
Most deserters reported their decision to desert was spontaneous. Around 100 Black Americans deserted to come to Sweden, but had little plans to live for long in Sweden, and most eventually left the country. Many deserters had trouble navigating Swedish culture, guilt with abandoning their army compatriots, and had trouble keeping relationships with people in the United States, usually due to geographic distance or controversy from their decision to desert.

=== Draft evaders ===
Draft evaders typically had an easier time adapting to Swedish life because unlike deserters, most were college educated and familiar with the anti-war movement. They also had fewer troubles finding ways to immigrate, unlike military deserters who had to escape from the U.S. military.

== See also ==
- Opposition to United States involvement in the Vietnam War
- Sweden–United States relations
- Terry Whitmore
