= Lotus (magazine) =

Trilingual political magazine in the Middle East (1968–1991)

- Editor: Yusuf Sibai; Faiz Ahmad Faiz; Ziyad Abdel Fattah
- Categories: Political magazine; Cultural magazine
- Frequency: Quarterly
- Founder: Afro-Asian Writers' Association
- Founded: 1968
- First issue: March 1968
- Final issue: 1991
- Country: Egypt; Lebanon; Tunisia; German Democratic Republic
- Based in: Cairo; Beirut; Tunis
- Language: Arabic; English; French
- OCLC: 269235327

Lotus was a trilingual political and cultural magazine which existed between 1968 and 1991. The magazine with three language editions was published in different countries: Egypt, Lebanon, Tunisia and German Democratic Republic. It contained one of the early postcolonial literary criticisms employing non-Eurocentric modes.

== History and profile ==
The first issue of the magazine appeared in March 1968 with the title Afro-Asian Writings. The magazine was established by the Afro-Asian Writers' Association (AAWA). Its foundation was first proposed at the Association's inaugural meeting held in Tashkent, Soviet Union, in 1958. The goal of the magazine was to support the Afro-Asian solidarity and nonalignment which had been stated in the Bandung Conference in 1955. It was published on a quarterly basis and had three language editions: Arabic, English, and French. Of them the English edition was started first and the Arabic edition was initially headquartered in Cairo. The other two were published in the German Democratic Republic. The magazine was financed by Egypt, the Soviet Union and the German Democratic Republic. In 1970 the magazine was renamed as Lotus with the subtitle Afro-Asian Writings from the sixth issue. The permanent bureau of the AAWA in Cairo was its publisher until 1973.

Lotus contained the sections of "studies", "short stories", "poetry", "art", "book reviews" and "documents. The first issue of the magazine featured an article by Léopold Sédar Senghor and Yusuf Sibai, founding editor of the magazine, which was about the meaning of the African identity. The magazine published the text of a talk by Ghassan Kanafani on resistance literature presented at the Soviet-sponsored Afro-Asian Writers' Association conference held in Beirut in March 1967.

On 18 February 1978 Yusuf Sibai was assassinated in Nicosia, Cyprus, and Pakistani writer Faiz Ahmad Faiz assumed the post. He remained as the editor of the Lotus until his death in 1984 and was succeeded by Ziyad Abdel Fattah in the post. Fattah edited the magazine until its closure.

The headquarters of the Arabic edition was in Cairo until October 1978 and was moved to Beirut following the sign of the Camp David Accords. In Beirut the Union of Palestinian Writers published the magazine which remained there until the Israeli invasion of Lebanon in 1982. Then the magazine together with the Palestine Liberation Organization moved to Tunis, Tunisia, but soon after was relocated to Cairo. The English and French editions of the magazine disappeared in the mid-1980s. The Arabic edition of Lotus folded in 1991 after the collapse of the Soviet Union ending its financial support.

=== Contributors ===
Although the contributors were mostly Arab writers from Palestine, Lebanon, Egypt, Algeria and Sudan who were the members of the Afro-Asian Writers' Association, there were also non-Arab editors from various countries, including Pakistan, Senegal, South Africa, Japan, India, Mongolia and the Soviet Union. Major contributors of Lotus included Mahmoud Darwish, Ghassan Kanafani, Samih Al Qasim, Adunis, Edward El Kharrat, Mulk Raj Anand, Ousmane Sembène, Alex La Guma, Hiroshi Noma, Anatoly Sofronov, Ahmed Sékou Touré and Agostinho Neto.

=== Views and legacy ===
Lotus billed itself as a "militant" periodical opposing the "cultural imperialism" and attempting to achieve a "revolution of construction." Its contributors considered the 20 century as a period of the new colonialism which made use of the commodification of culture accompanied by the expansion of the global marketplace. They opposed the economic imperialism which had penetrated into the cultural sphere. The magazine fully supported the view that the Soviet Union should be modeled by other nations in that it achieved a cultural and social condition which minority groups and their cultural heritage were respected. It was also argued that the Soviet Union had higher levels of educational and economic development, gender equality and respect for artists.

Lotus paid a special attention to the Vietnamese and Palestinian writing and emphasized the similarity between them in terms of revolutionary movements.

Some issues of the Arabic edition have been archived at American University of Beirut.

In 2016 a magazine with the same title was launched by the Association of African, Asian and Latin American Writers in Lebanon.

== See also ==
- Lotus Prize for Literature
