= Kul al-Arab =

Israeli Arabic-language newspaper

Kul al-Arab كل العرب

- Type: Weekly newspaper
- Owner(s): Mussa Hassadiya (40%); Fayez al-Shtiwi, and others
- Founded: 1987
- Language: Arabic
- Headquarters: Nazareth
- Country: Israel
- Circulation: 38,000
- Price: four shekels
- Website: http://www.alarab.com/

Kul al-Arab (Arabic: كل العرب, meaning All of the Arabs) is an Israeli Arabic-language weekly newspaper, founded in 1987.

Based in Nazareth, the paper is Israel's most influential and widely read Arabic-language periodical. It is also distributed in the West Bank. Kul al-Arab has 70 employees and a circulation of 38,000. According to the BBC the paper "is known primarily as a Christian paper" but "is trying to expand its Muslim audience." Most of the paper's revenue comes from advertising, and it is sometimes given away for free as a result. For some time the paper was edited by the poet Samih al-Qasim, who remained its honorary editor until 2014.

In 2005, the BBC stated that the paper "is scathing of Israeli and US policies, but can be equally critical of the Palestinian Authority." It has referred to convicted terrorists and suicide bombers as Martyrs.

The paper was founded by an advertising agency, al-Bustenai, then-managed by Mussa Hassadiya. As of 2008 Hassadiya owns 40% of the paper, with the rest owned by Fayez and "a group of Israeli-Arab businessmen." For a time Yedioth Ahronoth Group and Legal Tender Initiative each owned 25% of the paper, with Hassadiya and Shtiwi owning the other half. However, the two groups came into conflict, resulting in a court case in 2006 and Yediot and Legal Tender being bought out two years later.

The paper's publishing company also owns a women's magazine, Lady Kul al-Arab, and a website, al-Arab, which is visited by 45,000 people per day. Kul al-Arab also sponsors an annual Israeli Arab beauty contest with a $10,000 prize.
