= Nizar Mroue =

Arab music critic

- Born: 1931; Damascus, Syria
- Died: 1992 (aged 60–61); Beirut, Lebanon
- Other names: Neezar Mroue, Mururwwah
- Education: American University of Beirut
- Occupations: Musician, music critic
- Children: 2

Nizar Mroue (also spelt Neezar Mroue or Mururwwah) (1931-1992) was one of the most important contemporary Arabic music critics. Despite being a mathematician by training and having few writings on music criticism, his critical outlook on Lebanese musicians made his presence strong and felt throughout the world of music. His position in the field of music criticism enhanced his interest in other cultural fields. He practised artistic criticism in theatre, film, literature and plastic art. His first writings on music criticism go back to the early fifties in the magazine “Al-Thaqafa Al-Watania” (in Arabic: "لثقافة الوطنية", co-launched by his father, Hussein Mroue) when he had a section on music, history and criticism. Then he moved to various media outlets, especially the newspapers "Al-Nida" and "Al-Akhbar", and he supervised, respectively, the cultural page in each of them. Then he started broadcasting on “Sawt Al Watan” and “Sawt Al Shaab” radio programs, educating the listener on the history of Arab and international music and highlighting its greatest symbols. And in the last years of his life, he became managing editor of "Al-Tareeq" magazine.

== Life ==
Nizar Mroue was born in Damascus in 1931 to Lebanese parents. His father is the Lebanese thinker, Marxist intellectual, and martyr Hussein Mroue, and the author of several books on Arab heritage and literary criticism. Nizar lived his first youth in Iraq. In 1949, after his father's expulsion from Iraq due to revolutionary activity, he returned with his family to Lebanon with a high school diploma and joined the American University of Beirut (AUB) where he majored in mathematics and became fluent in English. But eventually, his life-long interest in the arts (especially music) won over him. Being a self-taught player of several musical instruments such as the flute Nizar expressed admiration for the musical arts (growing fond of Mozart's music especially) which later developed into an outstanding career that spanned several artistic fields. He spent the second half of his life practising artistic criticism in theatre, cinema, and literature, leaving a permanent mark on Lebanon's cultural and artistic history that remains present to this day. During his final years, he became an editor of "Al-Tareeq" magazine and took interest in more philosophically and politically inclined issues. He died in 1992.

== Legacy ==
Nizar Mroue's legacy remains present not only with his family, but also in his writings, critiques, and the works that he influenced including the plays of the Rahbani Brothers, Lebanon's most distinguished musicians and playwrights, whom he developed a mutual admiration with; in the words of Karim Mroue: "Nizar developed a deep respect for the Rahbanis. And they admired him, trusted his opinions, and benefited from his critical remarks. And often they made some adjustments in their works based on his critical opinions."Ziad Rahbani also remarked: "No one in Lebanon understands musical criticism like Nizar Mroueh. He talks about every musical note and click, and how a specific click fell from a specific note and he names that note exactly. He tells you: When they hit that "Fa", it comes of crooked! We had a guy who really understood music and knew how to play an instrument."
