= Yusuf Sibai =

Egyptian journalist and politician (1917–1978)

Youssef El Sebai
- يوسف السباعي
- Born: June 17, 1917; Cairo, Kingdom of Egypt
- Died: February 18, 1978 (aged 60); Nicosia, Cyprus
- Cause of death: Assassination
- Resting place: Cairo, Egypt
- Education: Egyptian Military Academy (1937)
- Occupation: Writer • politician
- Spouse: Dawlat El Sebai
- Children: Ismail and Nafissa
- Writing career
- Pen name: Youssef El Sebai
- Language: Egyptian Arabic

Minister of Culture
- In office 27 March 1973 – 18 February 1978

Yusuf Mohamed Mohamed Abdel Wahab Al-Sibai (Egyptian Arabic: يوسف السباعي; June 17, 1917 – February 18, 1978) was an Egyptian writer, soldier, and politician.

== Early life and education ==
Sibai was born in 1919. He graduated at the Egyptian Military Academy in 1937. Since then, he assumed many positions, including teaching at the Egyptian Military Academy.

In 1940, he taught at the Cavalry Corps in the Academy, and later became a professor of military history in 1943, and then in 1949 he was elected manager of the Military Museum. He later finally reached the rank of Brigadier General.

== Literary and journalistic positions ==
Sibai was an Egyptian writer. He became the Minister of Culture in 1973 and remained in that position until he was assassinated in Cyprus on February 18, 1978, because of his support for President Anwar Sadat's initiative to make peace with Israel after the president's visit to Jerusalem in 1977. He was also the chairman of the Al-Ahram establishment and the head of Egyptian Journalists Syndicate. He wrote 22 short stories and dozens of novels, the latest being Life Is A Moment in 1973. He was awarded the State Award in the Arts in 1973 alongside numerous other decorations.

Sibai was the chief editor of some Egyptian magazines, including Al Risala Al Jadida, Akher Saa, Al Musawar, and Al-Ahram. He also served as the editor of Lotus magazine from its start in 1968 to his assassination in 1978.

== Literary and monetary value of his work ==
Some of Sibai's works became best-sellers. Some of his novels were adapted into films, which were described by critics as more important than the novels themselves. However, the importance of his work began to decline especially when Naguib Mahfouz's work started to draw most of the critics attention. Although many critics avoid referring to his work as the end of the Romantic Era in Egyptian literature, as it touches upon the needs of a specific age group of young readers.

In the introduction to his book Yusuf Sibai: The Knight of Romanticism, Mursi Saad Eddin mentions that Sibai was not just a romantic writer but one who expresses a political and social vision in his depiction of the events in Egypt.

In addition, Abdel Karim says that his role in the Egyptian culture is of no less importance than his role as a writer and refers to the description of the late Egyptian critic Muhammad Mandur that Sibai "is not a writer who isolates himself in an ivory tower, but a man who goes to markets and walks through alleys and streets".

Yusuf Sibai is held as a phenomenon in the Egyptian cultural life. However, critics avoid dealing with his work save literary historians. Nowadays, the mention of his name is only limited to the film adaptations of his work, including "I'm going away", "Give Back My Heart", "In the ruins", "We Do Not Sow Thorns", "The Land of Hypocrisy" and "Al Saghamat". The Egyptian Television also produced a TV series about his life entitled Fares Ar-Romancia "The Romantic Knight".

== Assassination ==
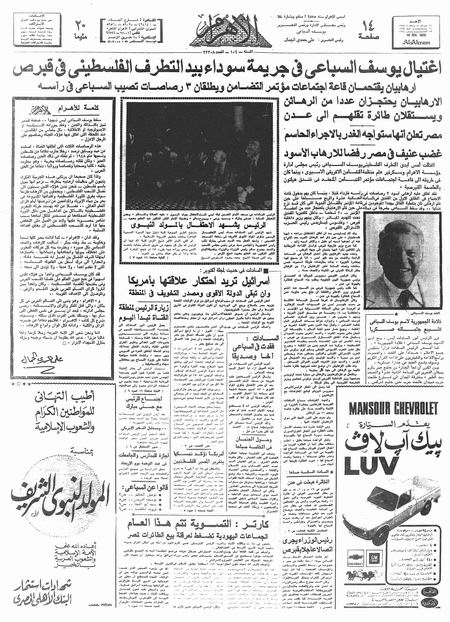
News of the assassination in Al-Ahram newspaper

Sibai was assassinated in the Hilton Hotel in Nicosia, Cyprus on February 18, 1978, while he was attending an Asian-African conference there. This murderous event had a negative effect on the Egyptian – Cypriot relations and forced Egypt to cut ties with Cyprus, particularly after an Egyptian special military unit landed at Larnaca International Airport to arrest the assassins without informing the Cypriot authorities. After the assassination, the two murderers took about thirty hostages of the members of the delegations participating in the Solidarity Conference and imprisoned them in the hotel cafeteria. They threatened that they would kill the hostages by grenades unless the Cypriot authorities promised to fly them out of the country. The Cypriot authorities finally yielded to their request and it was resolved to take them on board of a DC8 Cypriot plane to escape outside Cyprus. The plane took off from Larnaca International Airport. The battle between the special Egyptian force and the Cypriot army had led to the deaths of several members of the Egyptian force while many were injured on both sides. The crime was later blamed on Abu Nidal Organization (ANO), a militant Palestinian splinter group.

== His works ==
- The Deputy of Azrael – a novel (1947).
- Spectra (1947).
- Twelve Women (1948).
- Deep Hidden Secrets (1948).
- O Ye Nation Who Laughed – A book consisting of symbolic short stories (1948).
- The Land of Hypocrisy – a novel (1949).
- Twelve Men (1949).
- In The Parade of Passion (1949).
- From The Unknown World (1949).
- I'm going away – a novel (1950).
- These Souls (1950).
- Between Abu El-Rish And Namish Park – stories (1950).
- Lovers' Weeping Place – (1950).
- Virtue for Sale – a film (1950)
- Umm Ratiba – a play (1951).
- Al Saghamat – a novel (1952).
- Sheikh Zo'rob And Others – stories (1952).
- Dying For You, Night! – a novel (1953).
- Searching for a Body – (1953).
- Among The Ruins – a novel (1953).
- Give Back My Heart – a novel (1954).
- The Way Back – a novel (1956).
- Return My Heart – a film (1957).
- Among The Ruins – a film (1959).
- Nadia – a novel (1960).
- The Comic Society for Killing Wives – a film (1962).
- Dried Tears – a novel (1962).
- A Night with an End – a novel (1963).
- Stronger Than Time – a play (1965).
- We Do Not Sow Thrones – a novel (1969).
- You're Not Alone – a novel (1970).
- Smile on His Lips – a novel (1971).
- Life Is A Moment – a novel (1973).

== See also ==
- List of Egyptian writers
- List of Arabic-language writers
