= Afro-Asian Writers' Bureau =

Organization promoting Afro-Asian writers' cultural exchange and solidarity

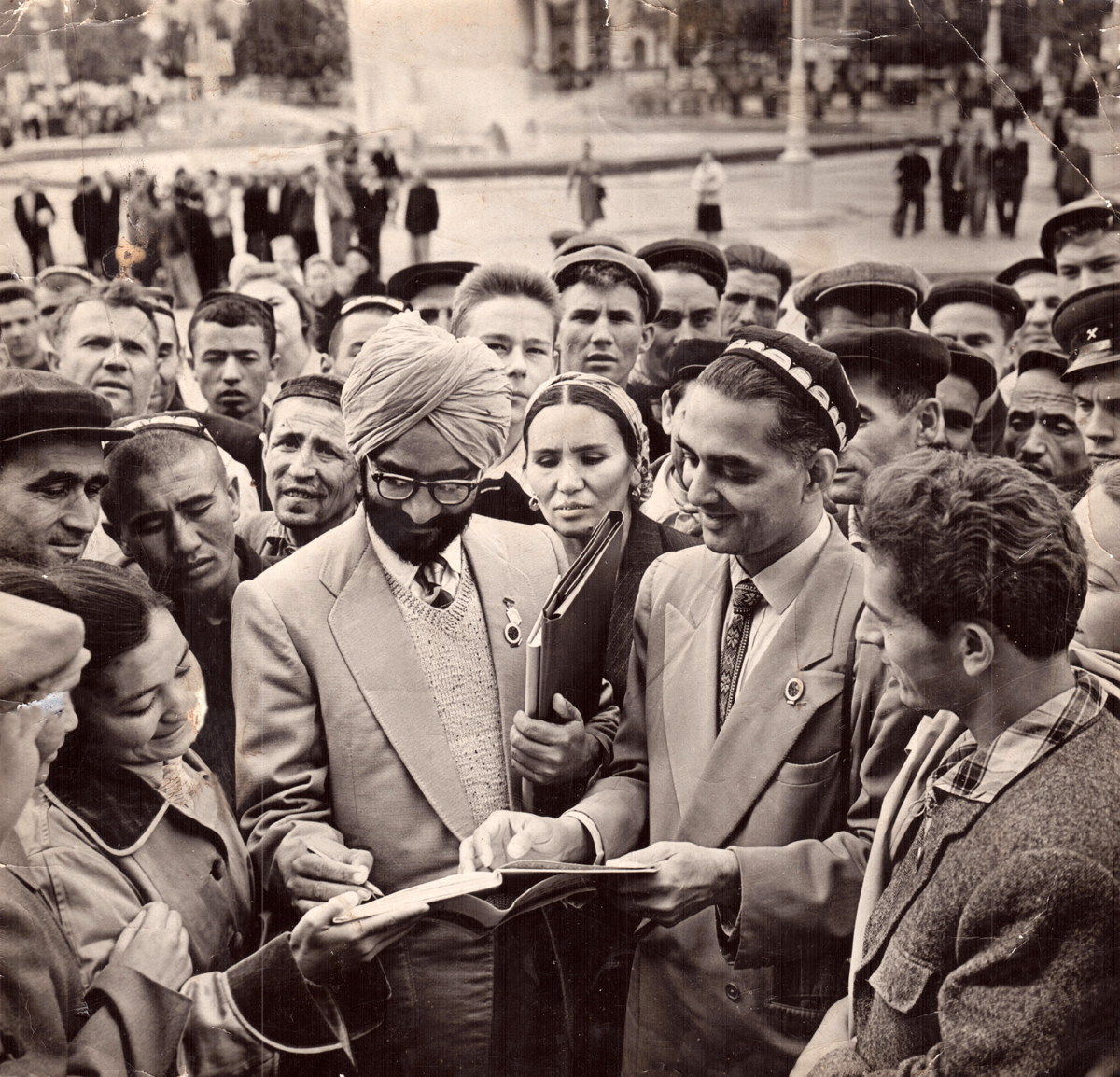
- First Afro-Asian Writers' Conference in Tashkent, Uzbek Soviet Socialist Republic, 1958
- Abbreviation: AAWB
- Successor: Writers’ Union of Africa, Asia, and Latin American
- Formation: 1957
- Dissolved: 1990s
- Purpose: Promotion of Afro-Asian cultural exchange and solidarity
- Location: Sri Lanka
- Region served: Africa, Asia, Middle East
- Members: Soviet Union, People's Republic of China, Egypt
- Secretary General: Ratne Deshapriya Senanayake

The Afro-Asian Writers' Bureau (AAWB), also known as the Afro-Asian Writers Association, and the Permanent Bureau of Afro-Asian Writers, was a transcultural, intellectual, and political organization that sought to challenge Eurocentric narratives by fostering solidarity among writers from formerly colonized nations.

== History ==
The AAWB emerged from the Bandung Conference in 1955. Influenced by Maoism and global socialist movements, such as the Soviets and Nasserism, the organization's members aimed to be actors of cultural decolonisation.

Decolonisation in the Cold War era sparked a rise in literary writing committed to anticolonial politics. From 1957 to the late 20th century, the AAWB served as a forum for transnational solidarity among anticolonial writers, resisting the uneven political and economic structures of the existing world through artistic collaboration. With prominent members like Mao Dun, Faiz Ahmad Faiz, Kofi Awoonor, Nazim Hikmet, Yusuf Sibai, Efua Sutherland, W.E.B. Du Bois, Zhou Yang, and Ratne Deshapriya Senanayake, the AAWB played a pivotal role in promoting literary and political exchange among decolonizing nations.

The Soviet Union and China competed for control of the AAWB as a tool for cultural diplomacy, a strategy which China continues to build on in the twenty-first century. Despite these conflicts, the AAWB saw transnational collaboration on major conferences and international recognition for publications such as Lotus, The Call, and the Afro-Asian Poetry Anthology series. The AAWB provided a platform for cultural exchange, anti-colonial discourse, and the redefinition of modernity from an Afro-Asian perspective.

In 2019, the AAWB would be revived as the Writers’ Union of Africa, Asia, and Latin American.

== See also ==
- Afro-Asian People's Solidarity Organisation (AAPSO)
- Bandung Conference
- Lotus (magazine)
- Lotus Prize for Literature

== Bibliography ==
- Fatima, Maryam. “Institutionalizing Afro-Asianism: Lotus and the (Dis)Contents of Soviet-Third World Cultural Politics.” Comparative Literature Studies 59, no. 3 (August 2022): 447–67.
- Han, Gül Bilge. “Nazım Hikmet's Afro-Asian Solidarities.” Safundi 19, no. 3 (July 2018): 284–305.
- Holt, Elizabeth M. “Cairo and the Cultural Cold War for Afro-Asia.” In The Routledge Handbook of the Global Sixties, edited by Jian Chen, Martin Klimke, Masha Kirasirova, Mary Nolan, Marilyn Young, and Joanna Waley-Cohen. 1st ed., 480–493. Routledge, 2018.
- Nabolsy, Zeyad el. “Lotus and the Self-Representation of Afro-Asian Writers as the Vanguard of Modernity.” Interventions 23, no. 4 (May 2021): 596–620.
- Vanhove, Pieter. “China and the Restaging of Afro-Asian World Literature.” In World Literature after Empire : Rethinking Universality in the Long Cold War. 1st ed., 27–50. Routledge, 2022.
- Vanhove, Pieter. “‘A World to Win’: China, the Afro-Asian Writers’ Bureau, and the Reinvention of World Literature.” Critical Asian Studies 51, no. 2 (April 2019): 144–65.
- Yoon, Duncan M. “‘Our Forces Have Redoubled’: World Literature, Postcolonialism, and the Afro-Asian Writers’ Bureau.” Cambridge Journal of Postcolonial Literary Inquiry 2, no. 2 (May 14, 2015): 233–52.
