= Sha'ab, Israel =

Arab town in northern Israel

Sha'ab: שַׁעַבּ; شعب
- Local council

Hebrew transcription(s)
  - ISO 259: Šaˁḅ
  - Also spelled: Sha'av (unofficial)
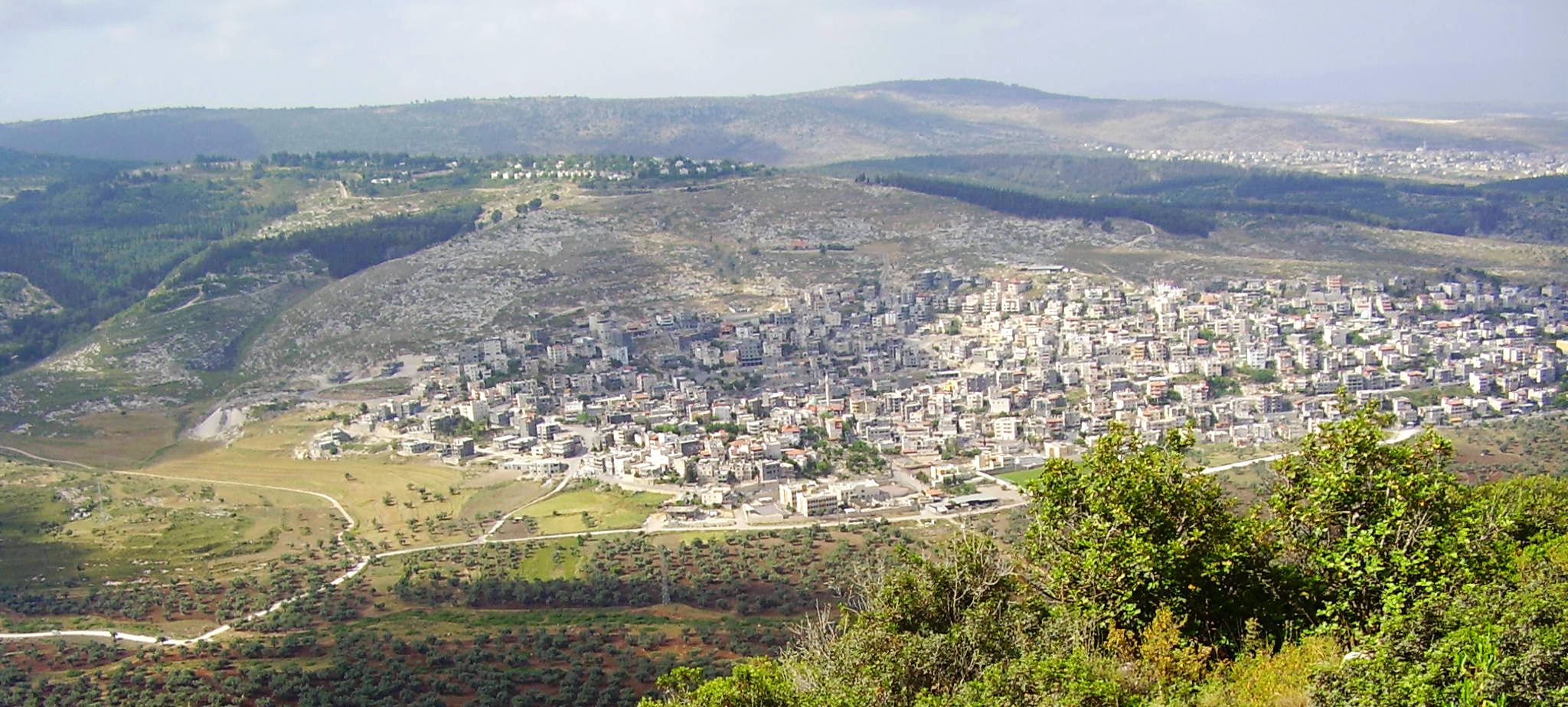

- Location within Israel Location within Northwest Israel
- Coordinates: 32°53′22″N 35°14′19″E
- Grid position: 172/254 PAL
- Country: Israel
- District: Northern
- Subdistrict: Acre
- Natural Region: Shefar'am

Area
  - Total: 5,442 dunams (5.442 km^{2}; 2.101 sq mi)

Population (2024)
  - Total: 7,789
  - Density: 1,431/km^{2} (3,707/sq mi)

Sha'ab (Arabic: شعب; Hebrew: שַׁעַבּ; meaning "The spur") is an Arab town and local council in the Northern District of Israel. It has an area of 5,442 dunams (6.4 km^{2} (2.5 sq mi)) of land under its jurisdiction. In 2024 its population was 7,789.

== History ==
=== Roman period ===
French scholar Victor Guérin associated Sha'ab with Saab, a place mentioned by 1st-century Jewish historian Josephus. The Midrash Rabba (Leviticus Rabba s. 20,9) mentions a certain Rabbi Mani of Sha'ab, together with Yehoshua of Sakhnin and Rabbi Johanan bar Nappaha.

=== Mamluk period ===
In the 14th century, the tax income from the village was given to the wakf of the madrasah and mausoleum of the Shafi'i Manjaq in Egypt.

=== Ottoman period ===
In 1517, Sha'ab was incorporated into the Ottoman Empire along with the rest of Palestine. In 1548–1549 or 1596, the village appeared in Ottoman tax registers as being in the nahiya (subdistrict) of Acre, part of Safad Sanjak, with a population of 102 households and 37 bachelors, all Muslims. The villagers paid a fixed tax rate of 33,3% on wheat, barley, fruit trees, "goats and bees", in addition to "occasional revenues"; a total of 14,354 akçe. Three quarters of the revenue went to a waqf. In 1573, the men of Sha'ab and neighboring villages (Majd al-Krum, Yarka, Julis and Kafr Yasif) allied with the Shihabs and Mansur Furaykh of the Beqaa Valley and raided other nearby villages (Rameh, Buqei'a, Beit Jann, Jarmaq, Meirun, Hurfeish and Suhmata), ending with the deaths of fifty to sixty people.

According to local tradition, the village started to flourish under anti-Ottoman rebel Daher al-Umar (c. 1768). Daher's chief imam, Ali ibn Khalid, hailed from Sha'ab (c. 1754) In 1859, the population was estimated to be 1,500. Some were Catholic, the majority Muslim. The cultivated fields were estimated to be 80 feddans. Guérin visited in the 1870s, and wrote that the village of Sh'aib consisted of four quarters. The inhabitants, he wrote, were for the most part Muslim, about 800, and some 20 "Schismatic Greek" families. The Muslims had two Mosques and two walis. In 1881, Sha'ab was described as being in a valley with fine olive groves, while part of the hill behind it was cultivated in corn.

A population list from about 1887 showed that Sha'ab had about 1,430 inhabitants; 1,345 Muslims and 85 Greek Catholics.

=== British Mandate era ===
In the 1922 census of Palestine conducted by the British Mandate authorities, Sha'ab had a population of 1,206; 1,166 Muslims and 40 Christians, where the Christians were 15 Orthodox and 25 Melkites. The population increased slightly in the 1931 census to 1,297; 1,277 Muslims, 19 Christians and 1 Jew, in a total of 284 houses.

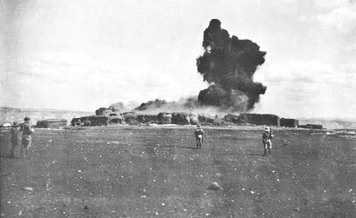
The demolition of houses in Sha'ab by British forces during the 1936–1939 revolt, 1936

During the 1936 revolt in Palestine, the British Army attacked Sha'ab, demolishing 190 houses in the village. According to an eyewitness account, the British collectively punished the village for harboring a rebel who allegedly set off a roadside explosive that killed four British soldiers and injured three. A day prior to the demolition of the homes, the army rounded up around 200 of its adult male residents and led them to a valley outside the village. As they were being lined up, a rebel fighter positioned on a nearby hill began yelling and firing into the air, confusing the soldiers and causing Sha'ab's detained men to disperse chaotically. One resident named Hassan Hajj Khatib was killed.

In the 1945 statistics, Sha'ab had 1,740 inhabitants; 30 Christians and 1,710 Muslims. They owned a total of 17,870 dunams of land, while 121 dunams were public. 3,248 dunams were used for plantations and irrigable land, 6,602 dunams for cereals, while 231 dunams were built-up (urban) land.

=== State of Israel ===
Sha'ab was captured by the Israel Forces (IDF) on 19 July 1948 during the 1948 Arab–Israeli War. The villagers surrendered without a fight. In December 1948, the residents were ordered to leave by the Oded Brigade. The village was the headquarters and hometown of Abu Is'af, who led Arab resistance groups during the war and was viewed as a hero. Many of the original residents settled in nearby Arab villages, predominantly in Majd al-Krum and Sakhnin while refugees from al-Birwa, al-Damun and Mi'ar relocated to Sha'ab after the war. Refugees from Kirad al-Ghannam and Kirad al-Baqqara in the Hula Valley joined them in 1953. The original residents launched a campaign to return to their homes soon after the war. Refugees from the Hula Valley and al-Birwa sympathized with them but those from al-Damun and Mi'ar were opposed. By 1950, roughly 10% of Sha'ab's original inhabitants returned to the village and eventually many more obtained permission to return.

== Demographics ==
Historical population
Year	Pop.	±%
1972	1,800	—
1983	2,300	+27.8%
1995	3,800	+65.2%
2008	5,800	+52.6%
2022	7,445	+28.4%
2024	7,790	+4.6%

In 2022, 100% of the population was Muslim.

== Notable buildings ==
=== Mosque of Daher al-Umar ===
The mosque of Daher al-Umar is situated in the centre of the old village. In 1933 it was inspected by Na'im Makhouly from the Palestine Antiquities Museum, who found that the mosque dated from the time of Daher al-Umar. In 1933 the mosque was in disrepair. Pictures from the time show two arcades: one had four arches connected with the side wall, with two columns in the centre. A reused Ionic capital could be seen, and above the doorway was a reused Roman lintel (first noticed by Guérin in the 1870s).

Andrew Petersen, an archaeologist specialising in Islamic architecture, surveyed the mosque in 1994. He found that the present mosque, built in the 1980s, encased the old building. The old part is the prayer hall, has an entrance to the north. This hall is square, covered with a dome. The dome rests on large squinches, which are supported by corbels. According to Petersen, the domed prayer hall is consistent with an 18th-century construction date.

=== Tomb of Shaykh Alami ===
The Maqam Shaykh Alami is situated south of the mosque, within its enclosure. It is built at a slope, where the ground rises to the south. On the east side there are two entrances; to the maqam, and to an underground cistern.

The building is rectangular, 10 x 20 m, with an interior divided into two. The southern part contains a mihrab and is covered with a barrel vault. The northern end is covered with a dome, and has two large cenotaphs. According to Petersen, the buildings appear medieval.

== Voting Patterns ==
In the 2022 election, 93 percent of voters in Sha'ab voted for the Arab parties, while 6 percent voted for the parties of the center-left coalition led by Yair Lapid and 1 percent voted for the parties of the right-wing coalition led by Benjamin Netanyahu. Among the voters for the Arab parties, 49 percent voted for the Hadash–Ta'al list, while 33 percent voted for Ra'am and 18 percent voted for Balad.

In the 2026 election, 97 percent of voters in Sha'ab voted for the Arab parties, while 1 percent voted for the parties of the center-left coalition led by Gadi Eisenkot and 0.2 percent voted for the parties of the right-wing coalition led by Benjamin Netanyahu. Among the voters for the Arab parties, 69 percent voted for the Joint List, while 31 percent voted for Ra'am. Voter turnout increased 47 percent from the 2022 election.

== See also ==
- Arab localities in Israel
- Depopulated Palestinian locations in Israel

== Bibliography ==
- Barron, J.B., ed. (1923). Palestine: Report and General Abstracts of the Census of 1922. Government of Palestine.
- Cohen, Hillel (2010). Good Arabs: The Israeli Security Agencies and the Israeli Arabs, 1948-1967. University of California Press. ISBN 9780520944886.
- Conder, C.R.; Kitchener, H.H. (1881). The Survey of Western Palestine: Memoirs of the Topography, Orography, Hydrography, and Archaeology. Vol. 1. London: Committee of the Palestine Exploration Fund.
- Department of Statistics (1945). Village Statistics, April, 1945. Government of Palestine.
- Ghandour, Zeina B. (2009). A Discourse on Domination in Mandate Palestine: Imperialism, Property and Insurgency. Routledge. ISBN 9781134009633.
- Guérin, V. (1880). Description Géographique Historique et Archéologique de la Palestine (in French). Vol. 3: Galilee, pt. 1. Paris: L'Imprimerie Nationale.
- Hadawi, S. (1970). Village Statistics of 1945: A Classification of Land and Area ownership in Palestine. Palestine Liberation Organization Research Center.
- Heyd, Uriel (1960). Ottoman Documents on Palestine, 1552–1615. Oxford: Oxford University Press.
- Hütteroth, W.-D.; Abdulfattah, K. (1977). Historical Geography of Palestine, Transjordan and Southern Syria in the Late 16th Century. Erlanger Geographische Arbeiten, Sonderband 5. Erlangen, Germany: Vorstand der Fränkischen Geographischen Gesellschaft. ISBN 3-920405-41-2.
- Heyd, Uriel (1960): Ottoman Documents on Palestine, 1552-1615, Oxford University Press, Oxford.
- Mills, E., ed. (1932). Census of Palestine 1931. Population of Villages, Towns and Administrative Areas. Jerusalem: Government of Palestine.
- Morris, B. (1987). The Birth of the Palestinian refugee problem, 1947-1949. Cambridge University Press. ISBN 0-521-33028-9.
- MPF: Ipsirli and al-Tamimi (1982): The Muslim Pious Foundations and Real Estates in Palestine. Gazza, Al-Quds al-Sharif, Nablus and Ajlun Districts according to 16th-Century Ottoman Tahrir Registers, Organisation of Islamic Conference, Istanbul 1402/1982.
- Palmer, E.H. (1881). The Survey of Western Palestine: Arabic and English Name Lists Collected During the Survey by Lieutenants Conder and Kitchener, R. E. Transliterated and Explained by E.H. Palmer. Committee of the Palestine Exploration Fund.
- Petersen, Andrew (2001). A Gazetteer of Buildings in Muslim Palestine (British Academy Monographs in Archaeology). Vol. I. Oxford University Press. ISBN 978-0-19-727011-0.
- Reichmuth, Stefan (2009). The World of Murtada Al-Zabidi: 1732-91 Life, Networks and Writings. Oxford and Exeter: Gibb Memorial Trust. ISBN 978-0-906094-60-0.
- Rhode, H. (1979). Administration and Population of the Sancak of Safed in the Sixteenth Century (PhD). Columbia University. Archived from the original on 2020-03-01.
- Robinson, E.; Smith, E. (1841). Biblical Researches in Palestine, Mount Sinai and Arabia Petraea: A Journal of Travels in the Year 1838. Vol. 1. Crocker & Brewster. ( p. 268)
- Robinson, E.; Smith, E. (1841). Biblical Researches in Palestine, Mount Sinai and Arabia Petraea: A Journal of Travels in the year 1838. Vol. 2. Boston: Crocker & Brewster. p. 257, 279, 305
- Schumacher, G. (1888). "Population list of the Liwa of Akka". Quarterly Statement - Palestine Exploration Fund. 20: 169–191.
- Tsafrir, Y.; Leah Di Segni; Judith Green (1994). (TIR): Tabula Imperii Romani: Judaea, Palaestina. Jerusalem: Israel Academy of Sciences and Humanities. ISBN 965-208-107-8.
