= Al-Khidr Festival =

Druze community festival

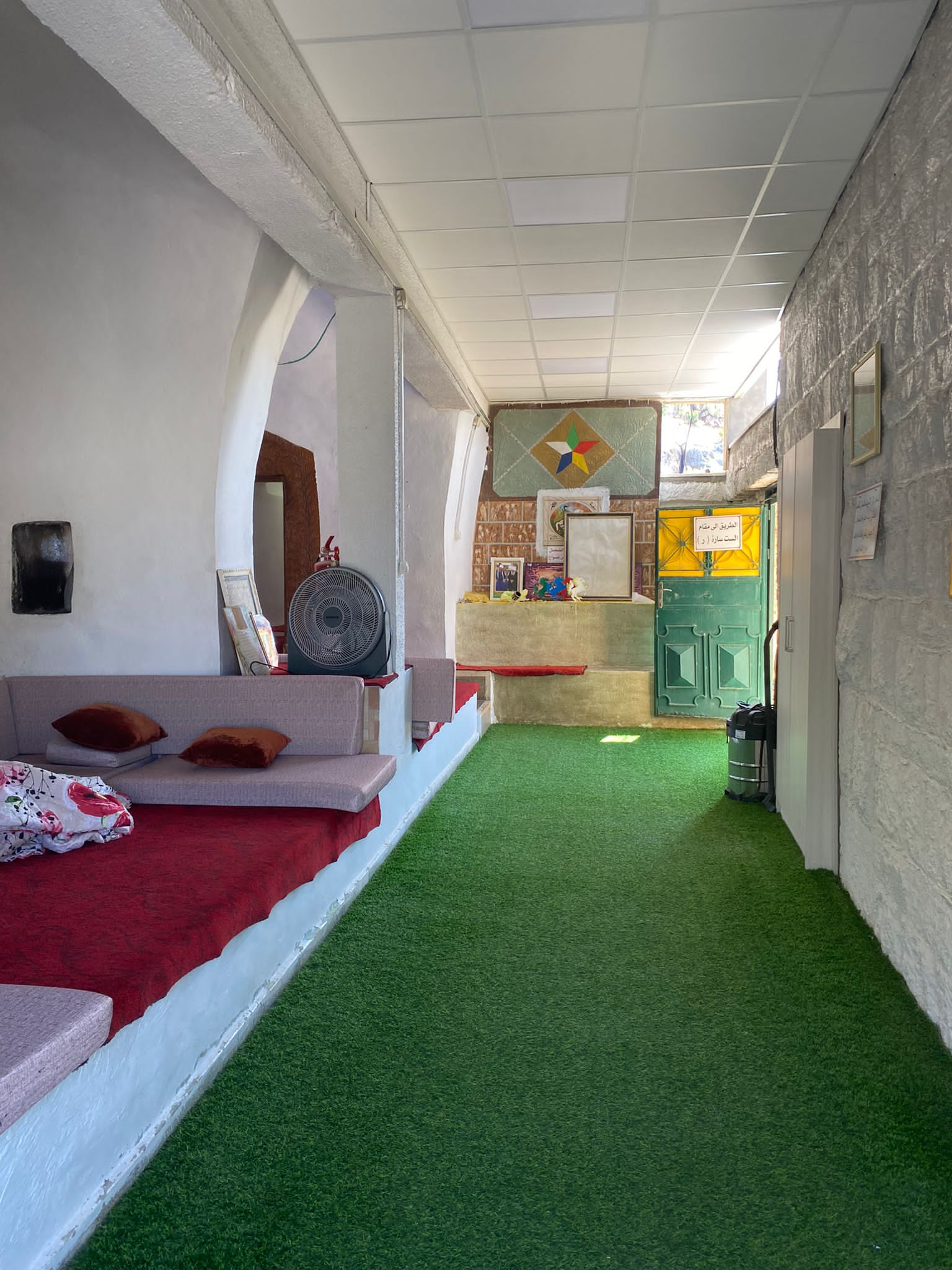
Maqam Al-Khidr

Al-Khidr Festival (in Arabic: زيارة سيدنا النبي الخضر) is a festival of the Druze community in Israel celebrated on 25 January. It includes a pilgrimage (زيارة) by community members to the Maqam Al-Khidr in the Kfar Yassif near Acre.

On the morning of the festival, it is customary to hold festive meals with traditional dishes such as Ka'ak Al-Ajweh (date cookies) and Baba Ghanoush (eggplant with tahini). The way to greet the celebrants is with "Ziara Makbula".

In Israel, Druze employees are entitled to take time off from work during the festival without loss of pay.

== Nabi Al-Khidr ==
Sidna Abu Ibrahim, also known as Nabi Al-Khidr (the Green One), is identified with Elijah the prophet. According to Druze belief, he is one of the founders of their religion. The nickname El-Khidr (the Green One) comes from the belief that his memory will always be fresh like a green plant.

Another interpretation is based on a Muslim legend identifying Elijah the prophet with Khidr, who was the vizier of Alexander the Great. According to the legend, Khidr was immortal and possessed extraordinary wisdom after drinking from the Fountain of Life.

Saint George is described as a prophetic figure in Druze sources; and in some sources he is identified with Elijah (Mar Elias), and in others as al-Khidr. The Druze version of the story of al-khidr was syncretized with the story of Saint George and the Dragon. Druze, like some Christians, believe that Elijah came back as John the Baptist, since they believe in reincarnation and the transmigration of the soul, Druze believe that El Khidr and John the Baptist are one and the same; along with Saint George.

== Prophet's Place ==
Until 1958, the prophet's site was not a holy place but a private house of a Druze family from Buq'ata. In 1958, Sheikh Abu Muhammad Akab Al-Mu'Arabi had a night vision, in which he saw that the prophet Al-Khidr had stayed in this house. Following the revelation of this vision to Sheikh Al-Mu'Arabi, he dedicated himself to establishing a Maqam for Nabi Al-Khidr in Buq'ata. After the death of Sheikh Abu Muhammad, Sheikh Abu Ali Hussein Abu Shaheen continued building the Maqam.
