= Rameh =

Rameh: רָמָה, ראמה; الرامه
- Local council (from 2005)

Hebrew transcription(s)
  - ISO 259: Ráma
  - Also spelled: Rame (official) al-Rama (unofficial)
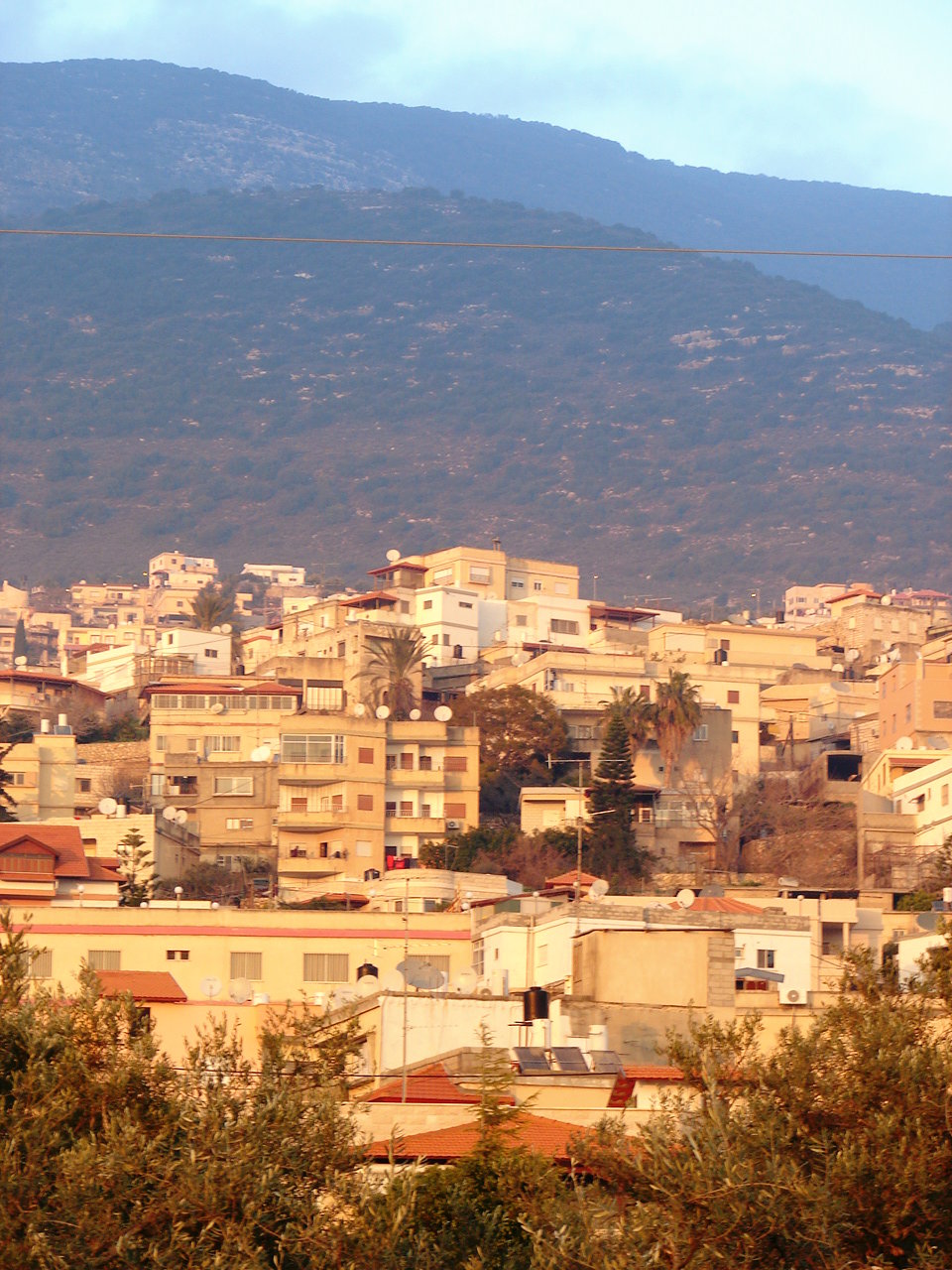

- Location within Northwest Israel Location within Israel
- Coordinates: 32°56′21″N 35°22′02″E
- Grid position: 184/260 PAL
- Country: Israel
- District: Northern
- Subdistrict: Acre
- Natural Region: Karmiel

Government
  - Head of Municipality: Shawqi Abu Latif

Area
  - Total: 6,118 dunams (6.118 km^{2}; 2.362 sq mi)

Population (2024)
  - Total: 8,405
  - Density: 1,374/km^{2} (3,558/sq mi)

Ethnicity
  - Arabs: 99.8%
  - Jews and others: 0.2%
- Name meaning: "Lofty" or "Elevated"

Rameh (Arabic: الرامة, romanized: al-Rāma; Hebrew: רָמָה; alternatively spelled Rama) is an Arab town in the Northern District of Israel. Located east of Nahf and Karmiel, in 2024 it had a population of 8,405. Around half of the inhabitants are Christians, mostly Greek Orthodox and Greek Catholic, over a third are Druze and the remainder are Muslims.

A village council was established for Rameh under the British in 1922, of the first in Mandatory Palestine. Rameh's Christian and Muslim residents were temporarily expelled after its capture by Israeli forces in the 1948 Arab-Israeli War, but they returned to the village, which also became home to many internally displaced Palestinians from nearby villages. A village council was established in 1954 by the Israeli government to oversee village affairs; from 1959 on, council members were elected. As of the 1960s, the people of Rameh have been noted for their high levels of education and standards of living. The village was home to the well-known poet Samih al-Qasim, the Greek Orthodox archbishop Atallah Hanna and artist Mira Awad.

The village is well known for its diverse cuisine, which draws many visitors from across the country. It is also noteworthy for being surrounded by vast olive groves and for producing high-quality olive oil.

== Location ==
The village is situated on an ancient site, atop a hill at the edge of Beit HaKerem Valley (called al-Shaghur in Arabic).

== History ==
Edward Robinson identifies Rameh with the ancient Ramah of Asher (Joshua 19:29), citing its location and ancient sarcophagi discovered on a hill outside the village as evidence.

=== Late antiquity ===
Rameh features ruins of several structures dating from the Late Roman and Byzantine periods. To the east are remains of Roman baths, dating to the 2nd to 4th century, and oil presses from the same period. South and southeast of the village, remains of building foundations were discovered, including an Aramaic inscription on a lintel, which indicate a 3rd to 4th-century synagogue. The inscription, consisting of two uneven lines of roughly incised Jewish script, is accompanied by reliefs depicting two cherub-like figures flanking a wreath. The text translates to "Remembered for the good be Rabbi ʾElʿazar son of Peraḥiah(?) and his sons … the gate …".

To the northeast of the Roman bath are the remains of a large basilica. It was excavated in 1972 and very large column bases were found, together with polychrome mosaics representing fauna and flora.

Many remains of pottery vessels dated to the Late Roman period (4th–5th centuries CE) have also been found, together with building remains from the Byzantine period.

=== Ottoman period ===
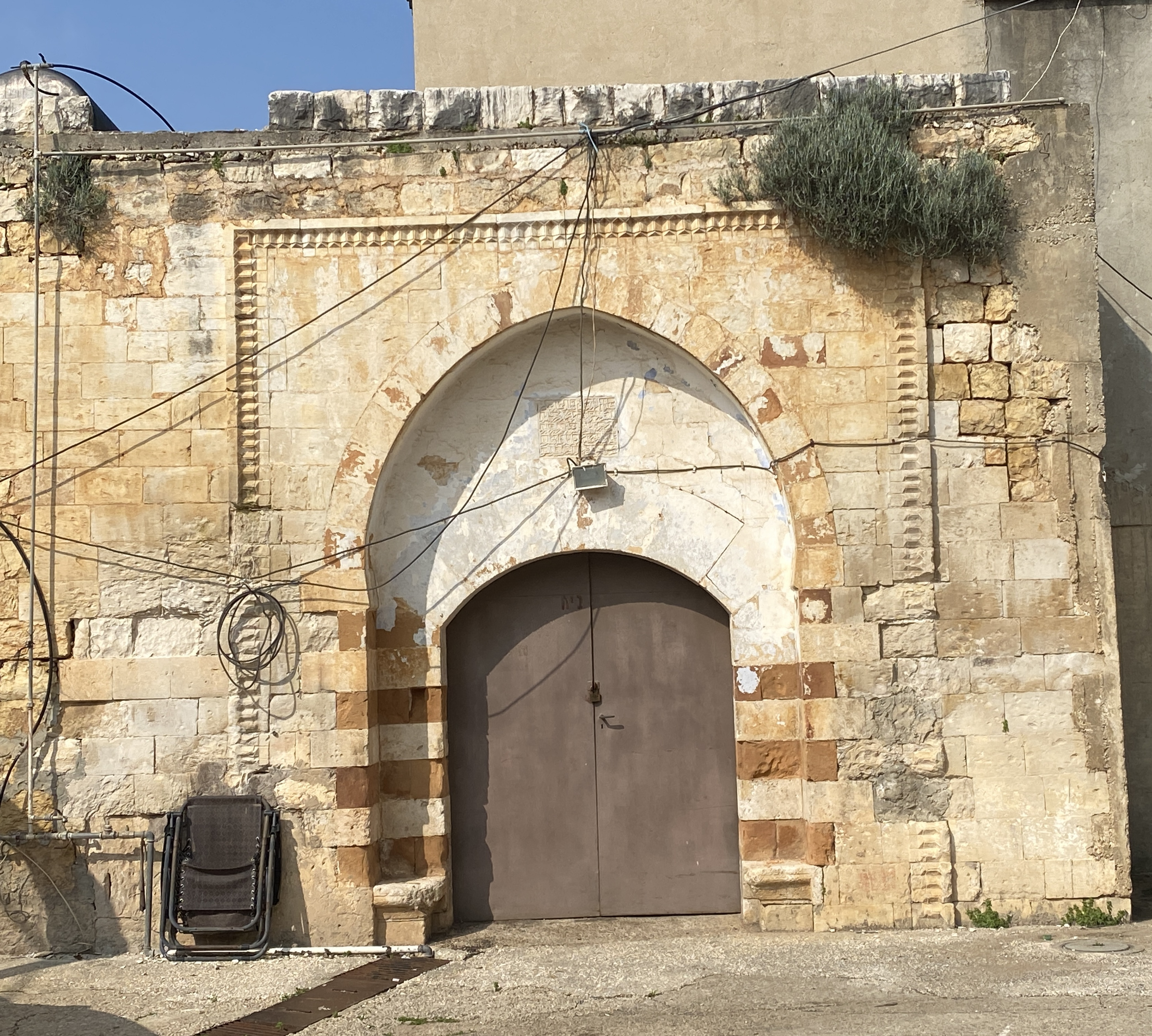
A house in the old core of Rameh

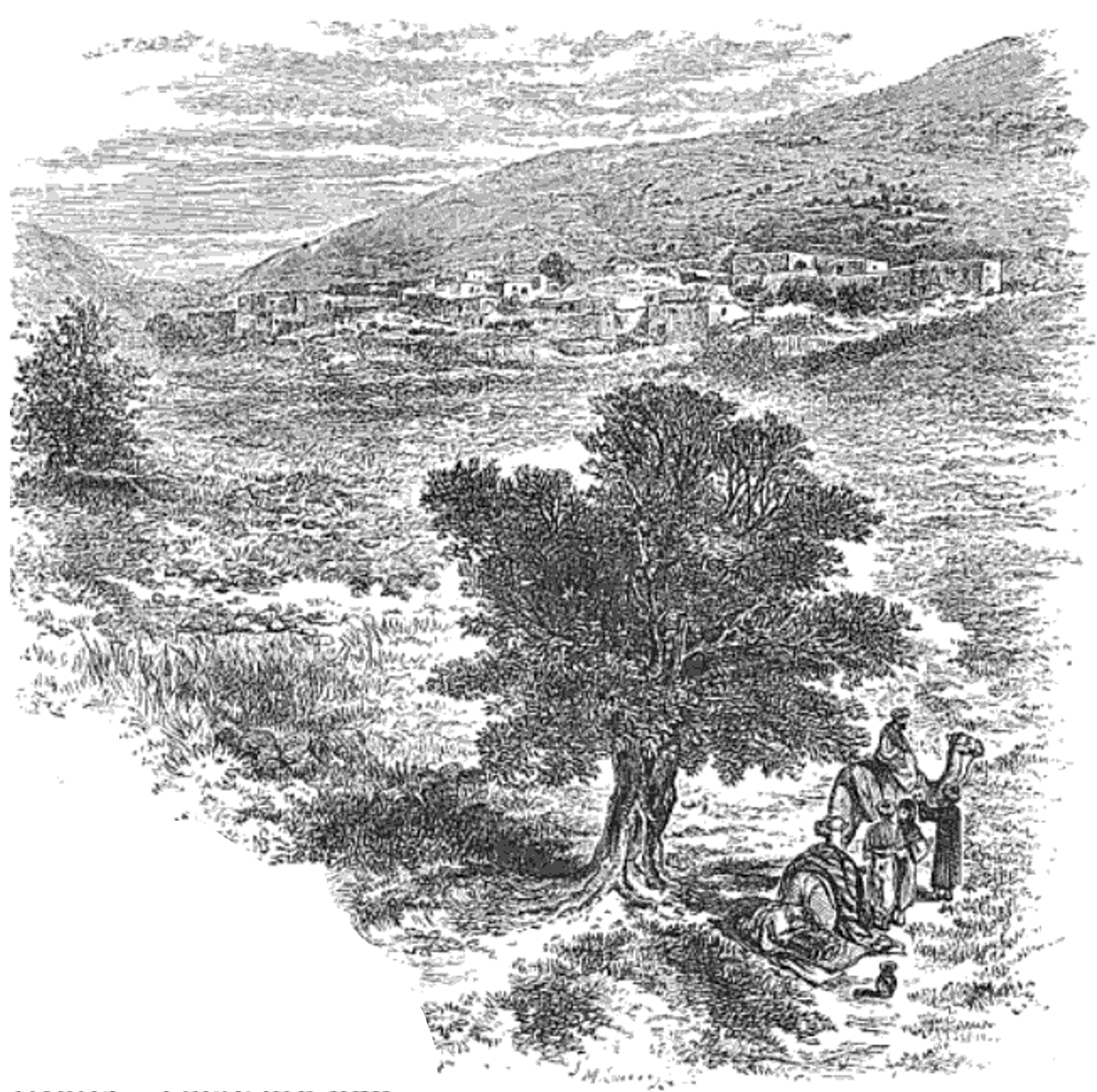
Mid-19th-century sketch of Rameh in William McClure Thomson's The Land and the Book

In 1517, Rameh was with the rest of Palestine incorporated into the Ottoman Empire after it was captured from the Mamluks. In 1596 (or 1548–1549), it was administratively part of the nahiya (subdistrict) of Akka (Acre), part of Safad Sanjak, with a population of 96 households, all Muslim. It paid taxes on silk spinning (dulab harir), goats, beehives, and a press that was used for processing either olives or grapes, in addition to paying a fixed, or lump sum; a total 21,986 akçe. Half of the revenue went to a waqf (religious endowment). In 1573 Rameh and other Safed-area villages were raided in a joint assault by men from another grouping of Safed-area villages including Majd al-Krum, the Shihabs of Wadi al-Taym and the Bedouin chief Mansur ibn Furaykh of the Beqaa Valley. The attack concluded after two or three days with fifty or sixty slain.

In the 18th century, Rameh was the center of a muqata'a (fiscal district) of the Sidon Eyalet, which from the 1740s was often controlled as a tax farm by the sheikhs of the Zayadina, a local Arab family, including its paramount sheikh Daher al-Umar. On 11 July 1774, Daher and his son Ahmad skirmished against his other son Ali in Rameh and were forced to retreat after Ahmad was wounded. When Daher was eliminated by the Ottomans in 1775, his son Ali led a rebellion against the new, Acre-based governor of Sidon, Ahmad Pasha al-Jazzar (1776–1804), and Rameh was one of the fortified villages under his control. After an abortive attack against al-Jazzar at Amqa, Ali was defeated at Majd al-Krum then withdrew to Rameh where he barricaded with 1,200 of his men. Al-Jazzar encamped at Nahf and from there ordered attacks against Rameh, prompting Ali's flight to Deir Hanna or Safed. Rameh then fell to al-Jazzar, who destroyed its walls. The muqata'a of Rameh was combined with that of Safed under al-Jazzar.

A map from Napoleon's invasion of 1799 by Pierre Jacotin showed the place, named as "Ramah". Rameh was entirely destroyed in the Galilee earthquake of 1837, with 180 of its inhabitants killed. The following year, Rameh was noted as a Christian and Druze village in the Shaghur district, located between Safed, Acre and Tiberias. In the mid-19th century (pre-1859), William McClure Thomson observed that Rameh was "a large and important village" of Druze and Greek Catholics with "well-built houses … picturesquely grouped near the foot of the mountain above it on the north" and surrounded with "extensive and flourishing" orchards. Victor Guérin visited the village in 1875, and found it to have 800 inhabitants, half Christian and half Druze. In 1881 the PEF's Survey of Western Palestine (SWP) described it as "a village, built of stone, of good materials, containing a Greek chapel and about 600 Christians and 500 Druzes; it is situated in plains, with large olive-groves, gardens and vineyards; five perennial springs near the village, and several cisterns in it." A population list from about 1887 showed that Rameh had about 1,125 inhabitants; 575 Muslims, 425 Druze and 125 Greek Catholics.

=== British Mandatory period ===
Under the British Mandatory administration in Palestine, a municipal council was established for Rameh on 15 October 1922. In the 1922 census of Palestine, Rameh had a total population 847; 624 Christians, 195 Druze and 28 Muslims. Among the Christians, 474 were Greek Orthodox, 47 Roman Catholics, 102 Greek Catholic (Melkites) and one Maronite. The population increased in the 1931 census to 1,142 residents living in 254 houses. The religious breakdown of the population was 746 Christians, 326 Druze and 70 Muslims.

In the 1945 statistics Rameh had a population of 1,690; 1,160 Christians, 440 "others"(Druze), and 90 Muslims. with 24,516 dunams of land, according to an official land and population survey. Of this, 8,310 dunams were plantations and irrigable land, 3,078 used for grains, while 56 dunams were built-up land.

=== State of Israel ===
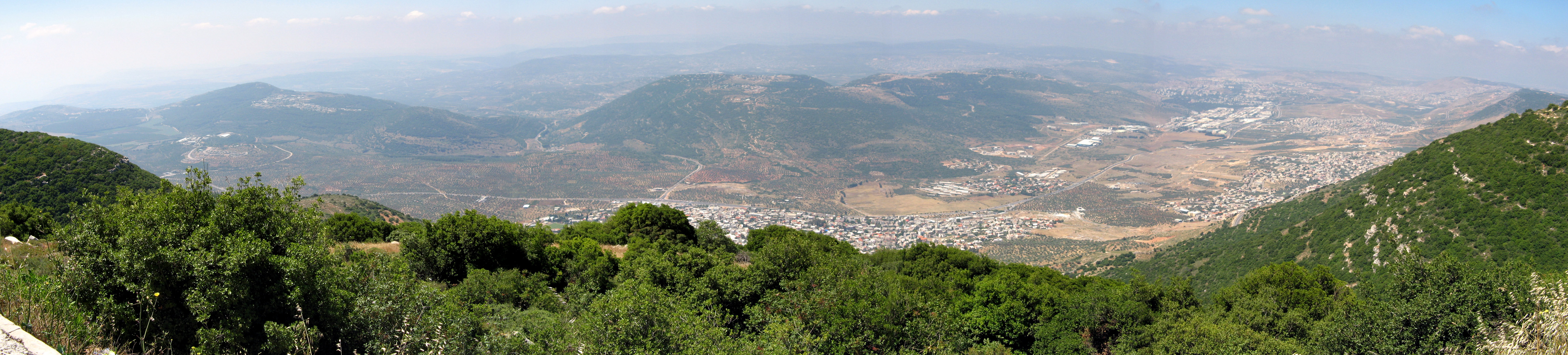
Panorama of Rameh (center) in the Beit HaKerem Valley (Shaghur), 2011

Rameh was captured by Israeli forces from the Golani Brigade without resistance on 30 October 1948 following Operation Hiram. Another Israeli unit entered the village during the next day and expelled 1,000 of its Muslim and Christian inhabitants on the threat of death, though the Druze were allowed to remain. The historian Benny Morris surmises that the expulsion order may have been driven by local Druze pressure to expel Rameh's Christians or a punitive response to the public support from one of Rameh's leading Christian notables, Father Yakub al-Hanna, for Fawzi al-Qawuqji, the leader of the Arab Liberation Army (ALA), one of the principal Arab forces in the Galilee during the 1948 Arab-Israeli war. Part of the expelled Christians camped out in the surrounding wadis (dry river beds) and caves, while others trekked up toward Jabal Jarmaq (Mount Meiron), stopping at al-Sahla (the plain) outside Beit Jann. There, Druze elders from Beit Jann and Buqei'a assisted them and contacted Jabr Muadi, a Druze notable from Yarka connected with the government, who intervened on their behalf. The Israeli unit departed the village on 5 November and Rameh's expelled residents returned to the village. According to Morris, their return was likely enabled by the intervention of the Israeli officer Ben Dunkelman of the 7th Brigade, who protested the expulsion order, while Adel Manna credits the Druze notables who similarly assisted Muslim villages in the same valley.

Many Christians expelled from the captured village of Iqrit settled in Rameh. Dozens of Muslims from nearby Kafr Inan were expelled by the Israeli authorities to Rameh, where they set up temporary shelters on the barren al-Dabba hilltop at Rameh's western entry, away from the village homes. Beginning in the 1960s, they were permitted to construct permanent houses there.

In 1954 a local council was appointed to administer Rameh's local affairs. Members of the 13-council were elected for the first time in 1959. In 1989 Fathinah Hana was elected head of Rameh's local council, one of three Arab women elected heads of municipal or local councils in Israel, the other two being Samiyah Hakhim in Nazareth and Nahidah Shehadeh in Kafr Yasif; before them, only one Arab woman in Israel had been elected to the position, Violet Khoury of Kafr Yasif in 1979–1988.

Rameh is home of the Abu Latif clan, a Druze crime family which operate mainly in the north, and one of main Arab crime organizations in Israel.

== Olive cultivation ==
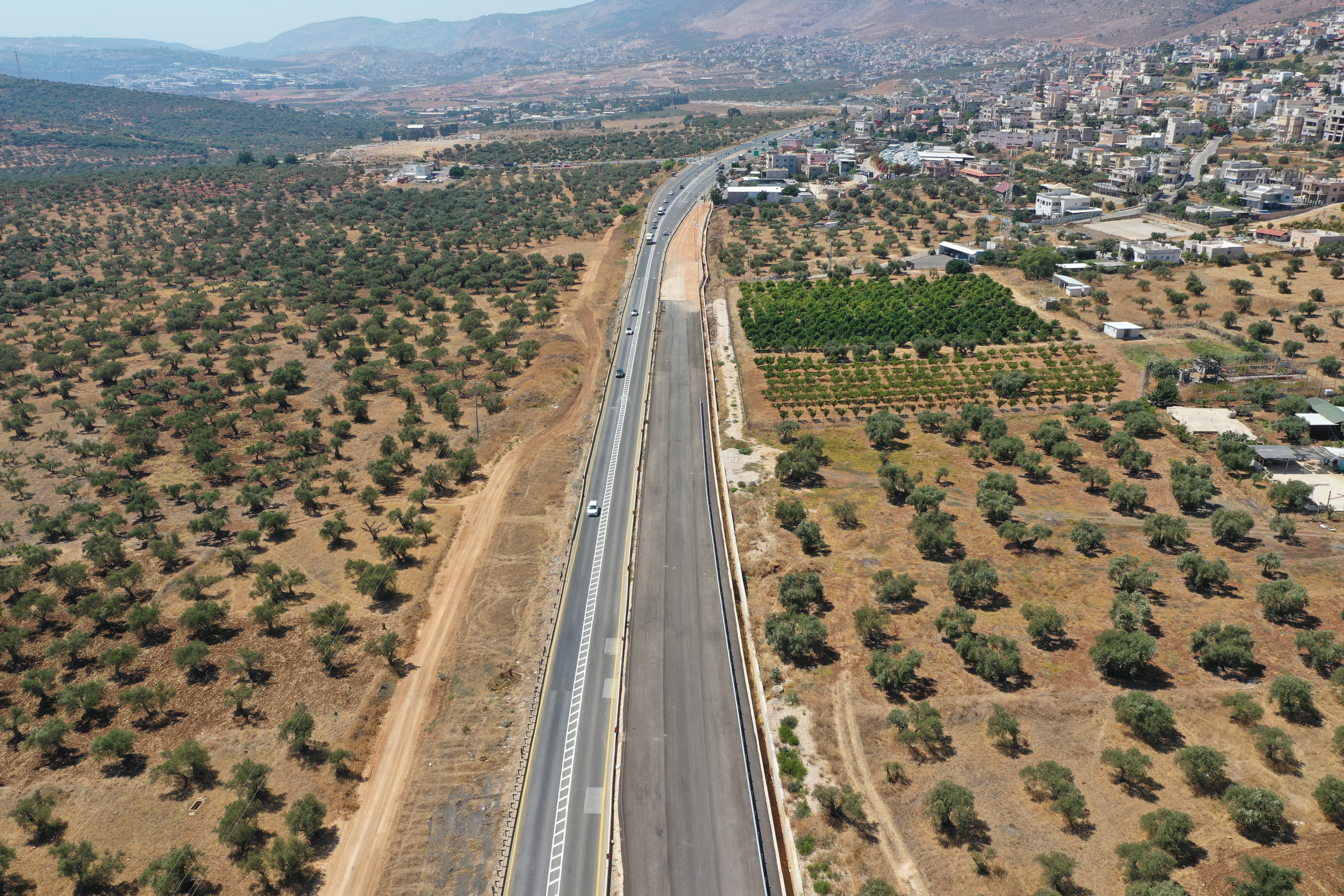
Olive groves of Rameh straddling the main highway

Rameh has long been recognized as a significant center of olive cultivation in the Upper Galilee. Nineteenth-century surveys described the village as having extensive olive groves and advanced cultivation practices relative to the region. In a 1910 bulletin of the United States Department of Agriculture, agronomist Aaron Aaronsohn wrote that Er-Rameh “holds the record for the productivity and quality of its olives,” noting both the uniformity of the fruit and the cultivation methods used in the area.

The reputation of Rameh’s olive oil during the British Mandate period is further reflected in contemporary Arabic-language newspapers. Advertisements published in the 1920s promoted locally produced olive oil from Rameh as clean, well processed, and suitable for household use, illustrating the village’s integration into regional olive oil markets.

In the 21st century, Rameh’s long-standing association with olive cultivation has also been examined through modern scientific research. A 2019 archaeobotanical study published in The Holocene identified genetic continuity between ancient olive remains from the Upper Galilee and olive varieties still cultivated in the region today. The findings were referenced in a 2021 New York Times article discussing olive oil production in Rameh and situating contemporary practices within a long historical continuum of olive cultivation in the area.

== Demography ==
Historical population
Year	Pop.	±%
1972	4,200	—
1983	5,100	+21.4%
1995	6,900	+35.3%
2008	7,200	+4.3%
2022	8,472	+17.7%
2024	8,406	−0.8%

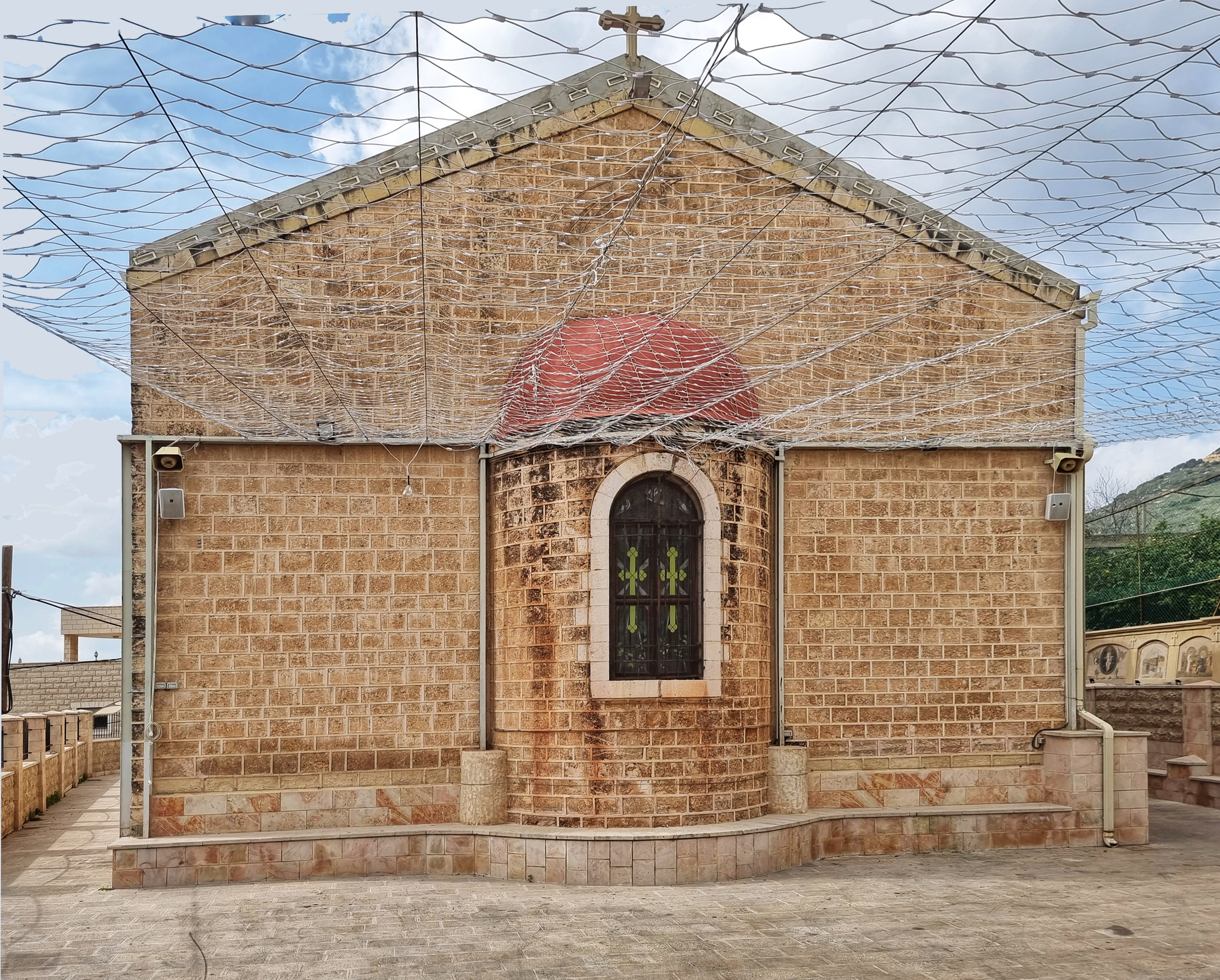
The Greek Orthodox church of Rameh.

In 2017, 53% of the residents of Rameh were Christian, 31% were Druze and 16% were Muslim. In 2022, 49.8% of the population was Christian, 31.4% was Druze and 18.8% was Muslim.

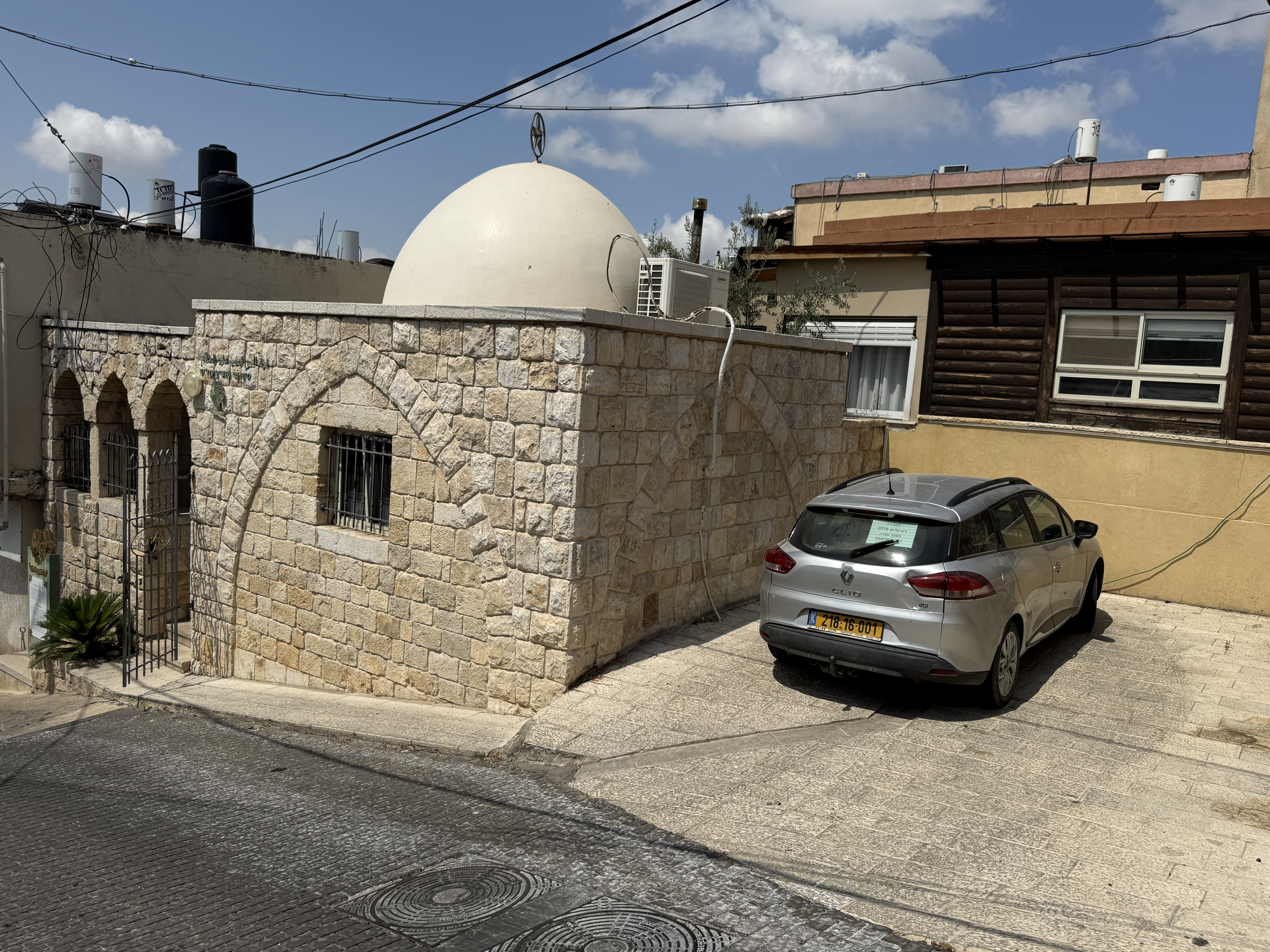
Druze shrine ("Khalwa") in Rameh

Writing in the 1960s, the historian Jacob Landau noted that Rameh was "distinguished by its high level of education and standard of living, expressed in the home, dress and general behaviour". At the time at least, the Greek Orthodox community was the largest religious group in the village and held the most influence over its local affairs, followed by the Greek Catholics (Melkites). The Druze maintained significant numbers in Rameh, but were politically divided at the time into two factions, while the smaller Christian communities, namely the Roman Catholics, and the Muslims, most of whom were internally displaced refugees from nearby villages, wielded little political influence. The Druze of Rameh are generally known to be the "least traditionally minded [Druze] in Israel", according to the historian Robert Betts.

== Voting Patterns ==
In the 2022 election, 62 percent of voters in Rameh voted for the Arab parties, while 28 percent voted for the parties of the center-left coalition led by Yair Lapid and 8 percent voted for the parties of the right-wing coalition led by Benjamin Netanyahu.

In the 2026 election, 64 percent of voters in Rameh voted for the Arab parties, while 28 percent voted for the parties of the center-left coalition led by Gadi Eisenkot and 6 percent voted for the parties of the right-wing coalition led by Benjamin Netanyahu. Voter turnout increased 31 percent from the 2022 election.

== Notable people ==
In alphabetical order by surname, article excluded:

- Mira Awad (born 1975), singer, actress, and songwriter
- Angelina Fares (born 1989), gymnast, 2007 Miss Israel beauty pageant contestant and subject of "Lady Kul El-Arab" documentary film; born in Rameh
- Basel Ghattas (born 1956), politician, Balad party, member of the Knesset (2013–2015-...)
- Faten Ghattas (born 1960), politician, Hadash party, member of the Knesset since 2026
- Jacob Hanna, biologist at the Weizmann Institute of Science who make the first synthetic embryos
- Archbishop Theodosios (Hanna) of Sebastia (born 1965), clergyman, Greek Orthodox Patriarchate of Jerusalem
- Hanna Mwais (1913–1981), politician, member of the Knesset for Hadash (1977–1981)
- Elias Nakhleh (1913–1990), politician, member of the Knesset (1959–1974)
- Samih al-Qasim (1939–2014), poet of Palestinian Druze descent
- Faraj Suleiman (born 1984), musician

== See also ==
- Arab localities in Israel

== Bibliography ==
- Barron, J.B., ed. (1923). Palestine: Report and General Abstracts of the Census of 1922. Government of Palestine.
- Betts, Robert Brenton (1988). The Druze. New Haven: Yale University Press. ISBN 0-300-04100-4.
- Conder, C.R.; Kitchener, H.H. (1881). The Survey of Western Palestine: Memoirs of the Topography, Orography, Hydrography, and Archaeology. Vol. 1. London: Committee of the Palestine Exploration Fund.
- Cinamon, Gilad (2009-05-04). "Er-Rama Final Report". Hadashot Arkheologiyot – Excavations and Surveys in Israel (121).
- Cohen, Amnon (1973). Palestine in the 18th Century: Patterns of Government and Administration. Jerusalem: The Magnes Press. ISBN 978-0-19-647903-3.
- Dalali-Amos, Edna (2011-09-26). "Er-Rama Final Report". Hadashot Arkheologiyot – Excavations and Surveys in Israel (123).
- Dauphin, C. (1998). La Palestine byzantine, Peuplement et Populations. BAR International Series 726 (in French). Vol. III : Catalogue. Oxford: Archeopress. ISBN 0-860549-05-4.
- Government of Palestine, Department of Statistics (1945). Village Statistics, April, 1945.
- Guérin, V. (1880). Description Géographique Historique et Archéologique de la Palestine (in French). Vol. 3: Galilee, pt. 1. Paris: L'Imprimerie Nationale.
- Hadawi, S. (1970). Village Statistics of 1945: A Classification of Land and Area ownership in Palestine. Palestine Liberation Organization Research Center.
- Herzog, H. (1999). Gendering Politics: Women in Israel. University of Michigan Press. ISBN 978-0-472-10945-6.
- Heyd, Uriel (1960). Ottoman Documents on Palestine, 1552–1615. Oxford: Oxford University Press.
- Hütteroth, W.-D.; Abdulfattah, K. (1977). Historical Geography of Palestine, Transjordan and Southern Syria in the Late 16th Century. Erlanger Geographische Arbeiten, Sonderband 5. Erlangen, Germany: Vorstand der Fränkischen Geographischen Gesellschaft. ISBN 3-920405-41-2.
- Joudah, Ahmad Hasan (2013). Revolt in Palestine in the Eighteenth Century: The Era of Shaykh Zahir al-Umar (Second ed.). Gorgias Press. ISBN 978-1-4632-0002-2.
- Karmon, Y. (1960). "An Analysis of Jacotin's Map of Palestine" (PDF). Israel Exploration Journal. 10 (3, 4): 155–173, 244–253. Archived from the original (PDF) on 2019-12-22.
- Manna, A. (2022). Nakba and Survival The Story of Palestinians Who Remained in Haifa and the Galilee, 1948–1956. Oakland: University of California Press. ISBN 9780520389366.
- Mansour, Atallah (2004). Narrow Gate Churches: The Christian Presence in the Holy Land Under Muslim and Jewish Rule. Pasadena: Hope Publishing House. ISBN 1-932717-02-1.
- Morris, B. (2004). The Birth of the Palestinian Refugee Problem Revisited. Cambridge: Cambridge University Press. ISBN 0-521-81120-1.
- Mills, E., ed. (1932). Census of Palestine 1931. Population of Villages, Towns and Administrative Areas. Jerusalem: Government of Palestine.
- Palmer, E.H. (1881). The Survey of Western Palestine: Arabic and English Name Lists Collected During the Survey by Lieutenants Conder and Kitchener, R. E. Transliterated and Explained by E.H. Palmer. Committee of the Palestine Exploration Fund.
- Rhode, H. (1979). Administration and Population of the Sancak of Safed in the Sixteenth Century (PhD). Columbia University. Archived from the original on 2020-03-01.
- Robinson, E.; Smith, E. (1841). Biblical Researches in Palestine, Mount Sinai and Arabia Petraea: A Journal of Travels in the year 1838. Vol. 3. Boston: Crocker & Brewster.
- Robinson, E.; Smith, E. (1856). Biblical Researches in Palestine and adjacent regions: A Journal of Travels in the years 1838 and 1852, 2nd edition. Vol. 3. London: John Murray.
- Schumacher, G. (1888). "Population list of the Liwa of Akka". Quarterly Statement - Palestine Exploration Fund. 20: 169–191.
- Thomson, W. M. (1882). The Land and the Book: Central Palestine and Phoenicia (Popular ed.). New York: Harper and Brothers.
- van de Velde, C.W.M. (1858). Memoir to Accompany the Map of the Holy Land. Gotha: Justus Perthes. (p. 341)
