= Hanna Mwais =

Arab-Israeli politician(1913-1981)

- حنا مويس
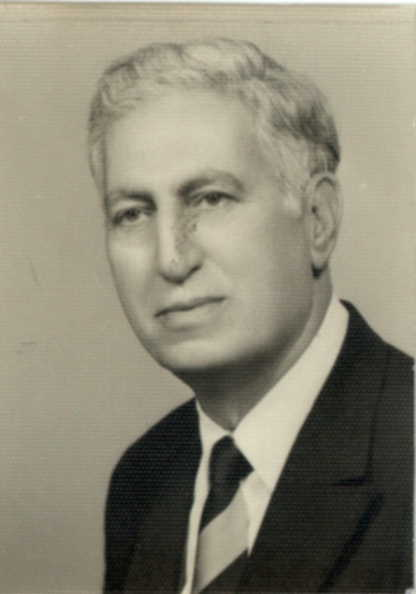

Faction represented in the Knesset
- 1977–1981: Hadash

Personal details
- Born: 1913 Rameh, Ottoman Empire
- Died: 13 February 1981 (aged 67–68)

Hanna Mwais (Arabic: حنا مويس, Hebrew: חנא מוויס; 1913 – 13 February 1981) was an Israeli Arab politician who served as a member of the Knesset for Hadash between 1977 and his death in 1981.

== Biography ==
Born in Rameh during the Ottoman era, Mwais was educated at a high school in Acre and the Scottish School in Nazareth. In 1956 he became a member of Rameh's local council, and in 1959 became head of the council. He also served as chairman of the National Committee for Arab Local Governments for a time.

Prior to the 1977 Knesset elections, he was placed fifth on the Hadash list, and was elected to the Knesset as the party won five seats. After being elected, he was a member of the Economic Affairs Committee and the Internal Affairs and Environment Committee.

He died on 13 February 1981, with his seat taken by Avraham Levenbraun.
