= Jacob Hanna =

Israeli Arab researcher in molecular biochemistry (born 1979)

Jacob (Yaqub) H. Hanna
- يعقوب هاني حنا
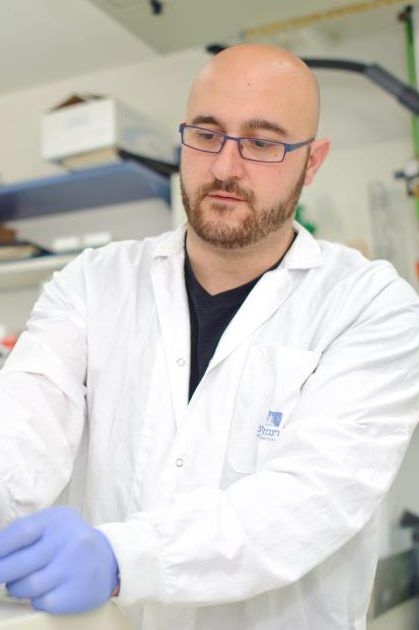
- Born: 26 August 1979 (age 47); Rameh, Israel
- Other name: Yaqub Hanna
- Citizenship: Israel (Palestine)
- Education: Hebrew University of Jerusalem
- Known for: The world's first synthetic embryos
- Awards: 2012 Krill Prize, 2013 Rappaport Prize, 2014 Kimmel Prize, 2018 EMBO Member, 2023 IVI Foundation Award, 2025 Nakasone Award
- Scientific career
- Fields: Stem cell research, Synthetic Embryo Models
- Workplaces: Weizmann Institute of Science
- Patrons: Rudolf Jaenisch

Jacob (Yaqub) H. Hanna (Arabic: Yaqub or Yaoub; born 26 August 1979) is a Palestinian biologist, born with Israeli citizenship, who is working as a Full Professor in the Department of Molecular Genetics at the Weizmann Institute of Science in Rehovot, Israel. An expert in embryonic stem cell research, he is most recognized for developing the first bona fide Structured Stem cell-derived Synthetic Embryo Models (SEMs) in the petri dish in mice and humans.

To achieve this, he first developed a technique for extended culturing mouse embryos outside the uterus (ex utero) in 2021 capturing normal development from before gastrulation until late organogenesis outside the uterus, subsequently applying his technique for making the first high-fidelity stem cell-derived whole embryo models of mice in 2022 (SEMs), and then of human in 2023 that can be made solely from embryonic pluripotent stem cells, without using egg or sperm and generated entirely outside the womb. SEMs are also known as "Stem-Cell-Based complete Embryo Models - SCBEMs", "Synthetic Embryos" or "High Fidelity Whole Embryo Models").

Hanna pioneered the extended static and dynamic post-implantation ex utero whole embryo growth platform that was critical for enabling the synthetic and structured embryo model establishment, and also pioneered developing the technology to generate alternative naive-like and naive pluripotent states in humans, that correspond to more early stages in development and retain an enhanced potential to make essential extra-embryonic tissue (e.g. placenta and yolk-sac), which proved essential for generating the first complete synthetic embryo models by his team and solely from such naive pluripotent cells.

== Education ==
Hanna has a PhD in microbiology and immunology and an MD in clinical medicine from the Hebrew University of Jerusalem. To train in stem cell research, he worked from 2007 to 2011 as a Helen Hay Whitney - Novartis postdoctoral fellow and a Genzyme postdoctoral fellow at the Whitehead Institute for Biomedical Research at MIT, Cambridge, Massachusetts, under Rudolf Jaenisch. In 2011, Hanna joined the Weizmann Institute of Science as an assistant professor in 2011, and has been there ever since. In 2018, Hanna received academic tenure and promotion at the Department of Molecular Genetics in the Weizmann Institute, and in 2023 became a Full Professor of Stem Cell Biology and Synthetic Embryology.

Hanna was listed in 2014 among top 40 under 40 leading international scientists by Cell journal and elected to the European Molecular Biology Organization in 2018. In 2021, he was announced as the top thinker of the year 2021 by Prospect magazine for his works on embryology. His extended ex utero embryo culture was selected among Science Magazine Breakthrough of the year 2021, and his mouse complete synthetic embryo models were selected by Nature magazine among seven technologies to watch in 2023. Human complete stem-cell derived embryo model generated by Hanna was selected by TIME in its featured list of inventions in 2023, and the generation of synthetic embryo models of development through using stem cells was selected as the method of the year 2023 by Nature Methods. He is the recipient of the 2025 Nakasone Award by the Human Frontiers Science Program – HFSP for " developing synthetic embryo models from naïve pluripotent stem cells, which provides a new foundation for developmental biology and regenerative medicine strategies."(Hanna's 2025 Nakasone Award Lecture)

== Early life ==
Hanna was born in Rameh, an Arab village in the Galilee region of Israel to a Palestinian Christian family. His father was a pediatrician and his mother was a high-school biology teacher. His grandfather was also a doctor in this village. He studied medical science at the Hebrew University of Jerusalem, obtaining a B.Sc. degree summa cum laude in 2001, and then continued to do an M.D.-Ph.D. degree at the same institute. He indicated in his interviews that his decision to undertake a career in research was heavily influenced and inspired by the success of his uncle, Nabil Hanna, who invented the first FDA-approved antibody therapy in humans (Rituxan, a blockbuster anti-CD20 mAb drug for treatment of non-Hodgkin lymphoma) while serving as chief scientific office of IDEC Pharmaceuticals. His Ph.D. research was supervised by Ofer Mandelboim and was on the roles of natural killer cells. In 2007, the Hebrew University awarded him both Ph.D. in microbiology and immunology and M.D. in clinical medicine summa cum laude. Hanna's three sisters also studied medicine in the Hebrew University.

Hanna decided not to go into practicing medicine but focus only on developing his research career in Academia. In 2007, he received the Helen Hay Whitney Foundation, and later a Genzyme-Whitehead Fellowship for outstanding postdoctoral fellows in 2009, by which he worked at the Whitehead Institute for Biomedical Research in Cambridge, Massachusetts. His research there till early 2011 under Rudolf Jaenisch helped him specialize in pluripotent stem cell research and induced pluripotent stem cell reprogramming.

== Research and discoveries ==
=== Induced pluripotent stem cell reprogramming ===
During his postdoctoral research at the Whitehead Institute, Hanna focused on studying embryonic stem cells (ESCs) and epigenetic reprogramming of somatic cells into ESC-like cells, called induced pluripotent stem cells (iPSCs). He developed transgenic mouse models to address problems in stem cell research. In 2007, he provided the first evidence that iPSCs could be used for a blood genetic disease, sickle cell anemia, by combined gene and cell therapy approach in mice. His supervisor, Jaenisch was awarded the Masri Prize and the Wolf Prize in 2011 for this research innovation, as the award citation read: "For demonstration that iPS cells can be used to cure genetic disease in a mammal, thus establishing their therapeutic potential".

Hanna made scientific contributions to understanding the iPSC phenomenon in its early days. He developed a novel inducible "reprogrammable mouse" transgenic models with drug controlled over expression of the Yamanaka reprogramming factors. This technique allowed him to create reprogrammed B lymphocytes carrying endogenous genetic rearrangements of the B-cell receptor (BCR) into iPSCs, thus providing definitive proof for the feasibility of reprogramming terminally differentiated cells to iPSCs that carried the original genetic rearrangement mark of the BCR.

=== Epigenetic reprogramming and naive pluripotency ===
Initially, his independent group identified a number of key epigenetic regulators influencing iPSC derivation efficiency such as the role of H3K27 demethylase Utx in iPS formation, and first demonstrated the deterministic reprogramming efficiencies (up to 100% within 8 days) via optimized depletion of Gatad2a/Mbd3 core member-axis of the NuRD co-repressor complex. The latter work set the stage for others to show alternative methods to obtain deterministic reprogramming. For example, Thomas Graf group showed that transient activation of C/EBPα, previously highlighted by Hanna and Jaenisch as a booster for B cell reprogramming, can yield up to 100% deterministic iPSC reprogramming from B cells within 8 days. Hanna also identified SUMOylation of linker H1 histone as a major determinant for transition between totipotency and naïve pluripotency states.

From 2013, Hanna worked as the Robertson Stem Cell Investigator of The New York Stem Cell Foundation. His first major achievement under the NYSCF research was the demonstration that human naïve-like ES/iPS cell state tin NHSM naive-like conditions that he discovered (and later also in HENSM naive conditions), has additional unique functional properties compared to conventional primed iPS cells, which is the creation of sperm and egg stem cells from human skin cell derived naive-like iPSCs, which has not been possible thus far with conventional human iPSCs. The experiment, done in collaboration with Azim Surani's team at the University of Cambridge, was published in the journal Cell in 2015. David Cyranoski reported in Nature as "A feat achieved for the first time in humans".

In 2014, Hanna criticized Jaenisch, his former postdoctoral mentor at the Whitehead Institute - MIT, accusing his team of publishing unreliable "false" negative experimental results on inability to generate any cross-species mouse-human chimerism in a paper published by Jaenisch on the pluripotency of human embryonic stem cells in the journal Cell Stem Cell. Surprisingly, in 2016, Jaenisch and his team reported positive results on the same topic in the Proceedings of the National Academy of Sciences (PNAS) and reporting the ability to create chimeric embryo from a mixture of mouse and human cells. In light of the latter, Hanna again raised the same critical comments in PubMed, suggesting retraction of a section of the previous 2014 Jaenisch paper in Cell Stem Cell that reported negative results, in contrast to the newly reported 2016 PNAS positive results by the same team led by Jaenisch. Jaenisch published a correction in the same journal. Later findings independently reported by Jun Wu group and others supported mouse-human cross-species chimerism with human pluripotent cells as originally reported by Hanna in 2013 and expanded further by his group in 2021. Human PSCs expanded in Hanna lab naive-like RSeT media were also independently shown to contribute to dopamine neurons in postnatal mouse-human cross species chimeras, thus solidifying the earlier claims by Hanna and refuting those published by Jaenisch in 2014.

The Hanna team has also tackled pathways that resolve naive pluripotency programs and delineated a critical function for m^{6}A RNA methylation in stem cell transitions in peri-implantation mouse development. Their study published in Science in 2015 provided the first evidence for the absolute essentiality of m6A mRNA epigenetic layer for mammalian embryo viability in vivo and uncovered opposing tolerance of epigenetic repressor depletion in naive and primed cells from the same species, that Hanna later used to optimize naive conditions in humans since only naive cells can tolerate genetic ablation or RNA and DNA methylation (deposited and maintained by METTL3 and DNMT1 enzymes, respectively). Hanna used the latter property to screen for conditions that allow survival of human pluripotent cells without these enzymes and termed the conditions human enhanced naive stem cell media (HENSM).

Hanna's lab also focused on deciphering the principles regulating naive pluripotency in different species and in 2013 his team was the first to derive human genetically unmodified MEK/ERK independent naïve-like pluripotent cells (termed NHSM conditions that were commercialized as RSeT by Stemcell Technologies). Hanna next developed engineered systems to screen for enhanced NHSM conditions that maintain human pluripotent ES cells that can tolerate removal of RNA or DNA methylation enzymes (by ablating METTL3 or DNMT1 genes, respectively), and identified enhanced NHSM conditions (termed HENSM), that can yield ESCs/iPSCs with more compelling characteristics of human pre-implantation blastocyst-morula stages.

=== From Naive Stem cells to synthetic complete embryo models developed ex utero - in mouse and human ===
Hanna is most recognized for developing a method, combining static and revamped "roller culture" conditions, for extended culturing of advanced mouse embryos outside the uterus (ex utero) in 2021 (from pre-gastrulation to late organogenesis for the first time), subsequently allowing him to make the first synthetic complete and bona fide mouse embryo models derived only from naïve pluripotent stem cells in 2022, and that can execute gastrulation and early organogenesis. In September 2023, Nature accepted Hanna's, previously preprinted article on bioRxiv on 14 June 2023, on the generation of complete and structured day-14 synthetic human embryos derived from human naïve ES/iPS cells grown in his HENSM conditions. Hanna's complete human stem cell-derived embryo model (SEM) can generate extra-embryonic trophoblast stem cells, mesoderm cells and primitive endoderm cells without genetic modification, transgene or transcription factor over-expression, and has structural and morphological uncanny similarity to day 14 human embryo inside the womb. Conventional human (and mouse) primed ESCs/iPSCs fail to achieve this feat, highlighting the essentiality of capturing alternative naive pluripotent states in humans to be able to derive up to day 14 human SEMs.

Prof Alfonso Martinez Arias, from the department of experimental and health sciences at Pompeu Fabra University, said it was "a most important piece of research". "The work has, for the first time, achieved a faithful construction of the complete structure [of a human embryo] from stem cells" in the lab, "thus opening the door for studies of the events that lead to the formation of the human body plan," Martinez-Arias said. It was reported by Philip Ball that Dr. Bailey Weatherbee from the University of Cambridge who tried to generate human embryo models "is impressed by the embryo-like structures reported by Hanna's team, and agrees that their own don't have these structures." Prof Robin Lovell Badge, who researches embryo development at the Francis Crick Institute, told the BBC that Hanna's human embryo models "do look pretty good" and "do look pretty normal". He also said "I think it's good, I thinks it's done very well, it's all making sense and I'm pretty impressed with it".

==== Synthetic stem-cell-derived embryo model research related ethical discussions ====
In 2022, when Hanna published the first bona fide mouse synthetic embryo with definitive proof of completing the process of germ-layer gastrulation and early organogenesis formation of beating heart and brain folds, he reported to the MIT Technology Review that he was already using the same method to make human embryo models (which indeed he was the first to report in 2023). The funder company, NFX, stated that the aim is "renewing human health—making all of us young and healthy." When Hanna announced the creation of the first human synthetic embryo models in a preprinted manuscript on bioRxiv and shortly after in Nature, it was received as a "breakthrough" and "groundbreaking advance" in science. But Hanna's scientific feat raised further the discussions surrounding ethical and legal controversies. The International Society for Stem Cell Research (ISSCR) has instituted guidelines for maintaining human embryos that are followed in most countries. However, the guidelines or any other legislations do not cover stem cell-derived embryo models, as the embryo models are made from ordinary cells. Hanna commented on Stat: "You don't ban nuclear physics because somebody can make a nuclear bomb."

Rivron, Martinez Arias and others, writing on the ethical issues in Cell in 2023, expressed a possible need to open discussions about revising the definition of an embryo since certain embryo models can theoretically become functional embryos and produce babies. Robin Lovell-Badge, at the Francis Crick Institute and member of the ISSCR guidelines preparation, also agreed that both natural and synthetic human embryo models should be regulated equally, saying, "These models do challenge the need to stick to the 14-day rule", referring the ISSCR's relaxation in 2021 the limit of growing human embryos up to 14 days. The scientific and ethical complexity were remarked by J. Benjamin Hurlbut, bioethicist at the Arizona State University: "The big question is how the boundary between a tissue culture and a human organism is going to be drawn and on what criteria." Pompeu Fabra University Professor Alfonso Martinez Arias, Ph.D., whose own lab is working on building human embryo models, noted that such conversations and debates are nothing new and should be welcomed. The International Society for Stem Cell Research publicly announced support for the research and highlighted to the public that such complete embryo models are only models of embryogenesis and should not be considered as embryos. British science writer, Philip Ball, alleviated concern related to this line of research by emphasizing that "None [of the embryo models] has the potential to grow into a human being, nor is there any reason why scientists would want them to." Upon publication of Hanna's ground breaking paper on human complete stem cell-derived embryo models (termed SEMs) in Nature in 2023, Philip Ball tweeted, "This is work at the absolute forefront of this extraordinary and exciting field".

== Personal life ==
Hanna openly identifies as non-binary. He was born as a Protestant, although he states that his family is not particularly religious.

== Awards and honors ==
- The Nakasone Award by the Human Frontiers Science Program – HFSP (2025) Hanna's Nakasone Award Lecture
- ISF Breakthrough Award (Israeli Science Foundation equivalent to NIH Director's Pioneer Award)
- Named on the 2024 STATUS List by STAT news, a prestigious list with most influential individuals in healthcare, medicine, & life sciences
- Human complete synthetic embryo model generated by Hanna was selected by the Time as invention breakthrough of the year 2023 ,
- The generation of synthetic embryo models was selected as the method of the year 2023 by Nature Methods journal on behalf of Nature publishing group.
- Mouse and human complete synthetic embryo models were selected by Nature magazine among seven technologies to watch in 2023.
- The IVI Foundation Award for Basic Research in Reproductive Medicine (2023)
- Manuscript describing mouse synthetic stem cell-derived embryo models among the 10 selected "Best of Cell 2022" publications by Cell journal editors (2023)
- The 2022 paper on stem cell-derived (synthetic) embryogenesis listed among top scientific breakthroughs of the year 2022 by The Atlantic magazine and The Week Magazine (2023)
- A Paul Harris Fellow by the Rotary International Foundation in recognition for scientific achievements (2022)
- Selected as top thinker for the year 2021 by Prospect magazine, UK for his work on stem cells and synthetic embryology (2021)
- Paper on ex utero embryogenesis listed among top scientific breakthroughs of the year by Science journal (2021)
- Robert Edwards honorary lecture and lifetime achievement award by the COGI meeting in Berlin (2021)
- Research on ex utero embryogenesis was covered in a dedicated Nature Outlook article (2021)
- Elected a member of the European Molecular Biology Organization (EMBO) (2018)
- Research Professorship Award by the Israel Cancer Research Fund (ICRF) (2017)
- The Segal Family Award for Excellence in Stem Cell Biology, University of Michigan, USA (2016)
- The Kimmel Prize for outstanding scientist at the Weizmann Institute of Science (2015)
- Selected among "40 under 40" most innovative young scientists by Cell journal (2014)
- Elected member of the Israeli Young Academy of Science (2014)
- Robertson Innovator Award in Stem Cell Research by the New York Stem Cell Foundation (NYSCF) (2013)
- Krill Prize for outstanding early career scientists by the Wolf Foundation (2013)
- The Rappaport Prize for a Young Researcher in Biomedicine by the Bruce and Ruth Rappaport Foundation (2013)
- Elected member of the European Molecular Biology Organization Young Investigator Program (EMBO-YIP) (2012)
- Inaugural Award for Excellence in Biomedical Research by the Palestinian Society for Biomedical Research (2011)
- Alon Foundation Scholar for distinguished junior faculty in Israeli academia (2011)
- The Clore Prize for an outstanding new scientist at the Weizmann Institute of Science (2011)
- TR35 Young Innovator Award for international innovators under the age of 35 by MIT Technology Review magazine (2010)
- Genzyme Postdoctoral Prize and Fellowship for Outstanding Postdoc at the Whitehead Institute (2010)
- Novartis Postdoctoral Fellowship by the Helen Hay Whitney Foundation – Novartis Fellow (2007)
- Hebrew University Medical School Excellence Award for graduating M.D.-Ph.D. students, Hebrew University of Jerusalem (2007)
- Max Schlomiuk Award for Ph.D. students graduating with distinction (summa cum laude), Hebrew University of Jerusalem (2007)
- Gertrude Kohn Award for outstanding scientific work in human genetics, Hebrew University of Jerusalem (2005)
- Foulkes Foundation Award and Scholarship for M.D.- Ph.D. students (2004)
- Wolf Foundation Award and Fellowship for Outstanding Ph.D. students (2003)
