= Juma Azbarga =

Israeli politician (born 1956)

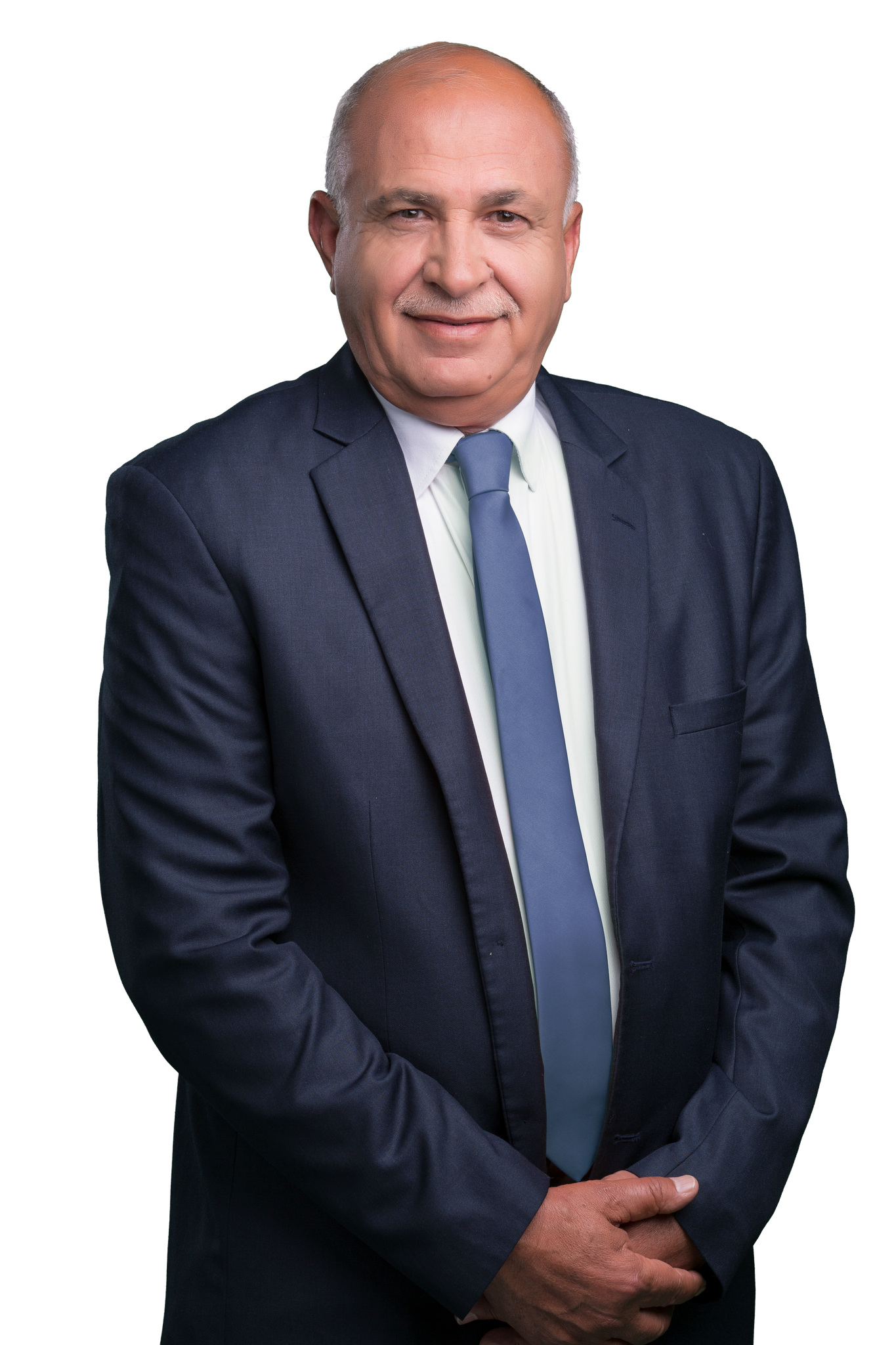
- Azbarga in 2021

Faction represented in the Knesset
- 2017–2019: Joint List

Personal details
- Born: 15 August 1956 (age 69) Lakiya, Israel

Juma Azbarga (Arabic: جمعة الزبارقة (Jum'a az-Zabariqa), Hebrew: ג'ומעה אזברגה; born 15 August 1956) is a Bedouin Israeli Arab politician. He served as a member of the Knesset for the Joint List between 2017 and 2019.

== Biography ==
Azbarga was born on 15 August 1956, in Lakiya, and attended a local community school as there were no state schools in Lakiya at the time. In 1973, he moved to Tayibe to continue his high school education, graduating in 1978. He then joined a teacher training college in Beersheba, but was expelled following an argument about politics with a lecturer. After working as an earthworks contractor, he helped open the first Maccabi Healthcare Services clinics for the Negev Bedouin community. He then attended Ben-Gurion University of the Negev, earning a BA in health administration, before returning to manage the Maccabi clinics in the Bedouins towns of Kuseife, Lakiya and Rahat.

Azbarga joined the Balad party in 1999, and was eighth on its list for the 2003 Knesset elections, but failed to be elected. In 2004, he was elected to Lakiya local council on the party's list. He was fifth on the Balad list for the 2006 Knesset elections, but the party won only three seats. He was moved down to tenth for the 2009 elections, which saw the party win three seats again, but was fourth on its list for the 2013 elections, but the party won only three seats. He was subsequently placed fourteenth on the Joint List, an alliance of Arab parties, for the 2015 Knesset elections. He did not enter the Knesset as the alliance won only 13 seats. However, Joint List MK Basel Ghattas gave up his seat in March 2017 after agreeing to resign from the Knesset and be jailed for two years after smuggling notes and phones to Palestinian prisoners in Israeli jails. Azbarga took Ghattas' seat on 21 March.

Balad contested the April 2019 elections in alliance with the United Arab List. Azbarga was given the 109th slot on the two parties' list, losing his place in the Knesset as they won only four seats.
