= Basel Ghattas =

Israeli politician (born 1956)

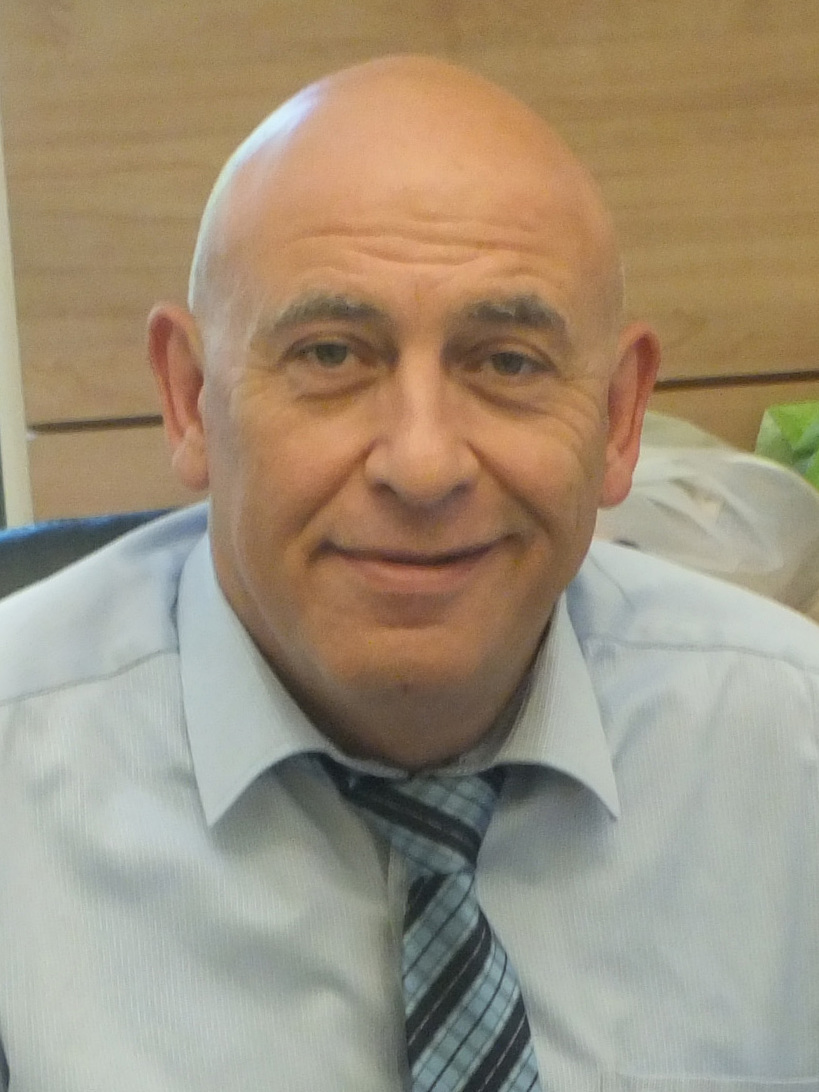
- Ghattas in 2013

Faction represented in the Knesset
- 2013–2015: Balad
- 2015–2017: Joint List

Personal details
- Born: 23 March 1956 (age 70) Nazareth, Israel

Basel Ghattas (Arabic: باسل غطاس, Hebrew: באסל גטאס; born 23 March 1956) is an Israeli Arab politician. A member of Balad, he served as a member of the Knesset for Balad and the Joint List from 2015 until 2017. In December 2016, he was stripped of his parliamentary immunity and arrested after he was caught on video providing convicted Palestinian prisoners with cell phones and SIM cards. He served a two-year prison term over the crime.

== Biography ==
A Christian Arab, Ghattas originates from Rameh. During high school he established the National Committee of Arab High School students with his cousin, Azmi Bishara. During his time at university he also established Arab student groups.

After finishing university he opened an engineering firm in Rameh. At the age of 22 he was elected Deputy Leader of the town council as a member of Rakah, which later became Maki. He was ejected from the party in 1990 after challenging its pro-Soviet stance. He then helped found Brit Shivyon, a short-lived Jewish-Arab movement, before becoming a founder member of Balad in 1995.

He later attended the Technion, where he gained a PhD in environmental engineering, and joined the Galilee Society, an NGO involved in health and environmental issues with the Arab community. In 2007 he established Malakom, the only business magazine targeted at the Israeli Arab community.

Having initially chosen not to run for the Knesset after Balad was founded, in 2012 Ghattas was placed third on the party's list for the 2013 Knesset elections, and was elected to the Knesset as the party won three seats. Prior to the 2015 elections Balad joined the Joint List alliance; Ghattas was placed eleventh on the alliance's list, and was re-elected as it won 13 seats.

On 20 December 2016 Ghattas was questioned by police after he was filmed smuggling cellphones and SIM cards to Palestinian security prisoners in Ketziot Prison during a visit. Due to his parliamentary immunity, he had not been subjected to a security check at the prison gates. On 22 December 2016, hours before a planned Knesset vote to strip Ghattas of his parliamentary immunity, Ghattas voluntarily relinquished his parliamentary immunity and was arrested shortly after police found 12 cellphones and 16 SIM cards on Palestinian security prisoners whom he had visited. Ghattas faced charges of aiding terrorists, complicity in committing a felony, deceptive practices, breach of trust and violation of the Prison Service code. He gave up his seat in March 2017 after agreeing to resign from the Knesset and be jailed for two years after smuggling notes and phones to Palestinian terrorists in Israeli jails. On 21 March his seat was taken by Juma Azbarga. On 2 July 2017, he arrived at Gilboa Prison to begin serving his sentence.

In November 2018 a parole board rejected a request by Ghattas to grant him parole after serving one-third of his sentence. The parole board ruled that he had failed to express genuine remorse for his actions and noted that he had failed to enroll in a rehabilitation program. He was released on 27 May 2019.
