= Faraj Suleiman =

Palestinian musician (born 1984)

- فرج سليمان
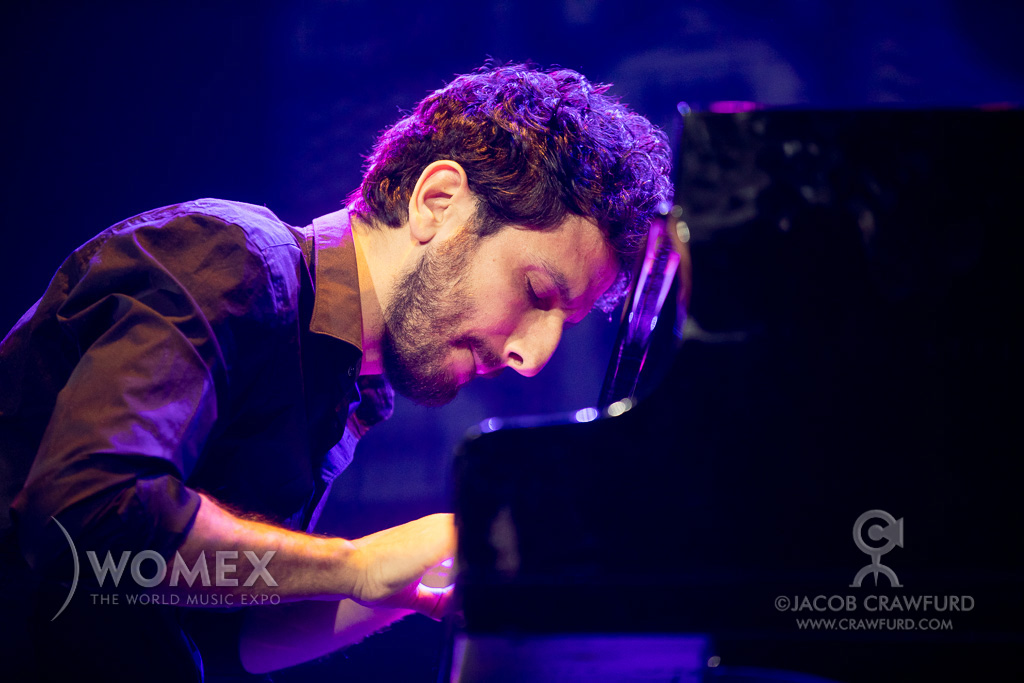
- Born: 1984 (age 41–42); Rameh, Northern District, Israel
- Citizenship: Palestine
- Occupation: Musician
- Years active: 2013–present

Faraj Suleiman (Arabic: فرج سليمان; born 1984) is a Palestinian musician. Born in Rameh and based in Haifa, he is known for his fusion of jazz with traditional Palestinian and Arabic sounds.

== Biography ==
Suleiman was born and raised in Rameh. His father ran a toy shop, which went on to inspire Suleiman's 2017 album Toy Box.

Suleiman started learning the piano at the age of three, and was taught for three years by his uncle, Youssef Basila, an artist. Suleiman stopped playing for fifteen years, starting again when he was a student at Hebrew University of Jerusalem.

In 2013, Suleiman moved to Haifa, where he started his musical career, with his first album, Log-in, released the following year. Suleiman stated that he was influenced by rock, classical and jazz music, and that his piano style was heavily inspired by the Armenian jazz pianist Tigran Hamasyan. Suleiman incorporated Arabic melodies into his music, although has stated that due to the Israeli occupation of Palestine, there was not a clearly defined Palestinian sound for the younger generation. Suleiman's early work, including Log-in, was noticeable for the absence of the oud, a traditional instrument common in Arabic music, which he stated was due to him trying to develop a "new tone" of Palestinian music.

In the latter 2010s, Suleiman was based in Paris, France, where he was an artist-in-residence at the Cité internationale des arts. During this time, he completed his sixth album, Second Verse, which was notable for being performed in Palestinian Arabic as opposed to Lebanese Arabic or Egyptian Arabic, which were more commonly used in Arabic music. During his residency, Suleiman performed at various European festivals, including the Montreux Jazz Festival in Switzerland, the EFG London Jazz Festival in the United Kingdom, and Arabofolies at the Institut du Monde Arabe in Paris.

Suleiman returned to Haifa following the COVID-19 pandemic. He had continued to collaborate with Haifa-based Palestinian artists during his time in France, including with Bashar Murkus in The Cabaret show at the Khashabi Theatre, and with Raneen Hanna on My Heart is a Forest, a children's album produced by the Tamer Institute for Community Education. Upon his return, he released the collaborative album Better Than Berlin in 2020 with Majd Kayyal, which documented how Haifa had become a centre of Palestinian culture. He also worked on another collaborative album, The Trace of the Butterfly, with various Palestinian musicians rearranging songs by the late singer Rim Banna.

Suleiman collaborated with the artist Banksy at the Walled Off Hotel, an art exhibition in Bethlehem.

In 2025, Suleiman was among the performers at the Together for Palestine benefit concert in London.
