= Violet Khoury =

Israeli politician

Violet Khoury (Arabic: فيوليت خوري; 1929 - 1987) was an Israeli politician who served as the head of the local council of Kafr Yasif, making her the sole woman at the time to hold such a position in an Arab council in Israel, and the first woman elected to an Arab local council.

Khoury was born into a family of Greek Orthodox priests, with her father working as a policeman and her mother running a girls' school in Haifa. She attended a mixed Jewish-Arab English high school for girls in Haifa. Following that, she pursued studies in social work and after her graduation started working, conducting fieldwork in Arab villages across the Galilee. However, her actions faced criticism from some in Kafr Yasif who deemed it unbecoming for a single woman. Hence, in 1952, she entered into an arranged engagement with Fawzi Khoury, who was 18 years her senior. A year later, they formalized their union in marriage.

Khoury entered local politics following her husband, who initially served as a council member and later became the head of the council. When he assumed the position of council head, there was an attempt to relocate Khoury to work in Rameh village to avoid conflict of interest seeing that she was employed as a social worker by the Kafr Yasif Council at the time. However, she declined this move, chose to resign, and instead opened a clothing store. Subsequently, she established the first kindergarten in Kafr Yasif. After a political crisis within the council, Fawzi resigned, leading the council's plenary to ask Khoury to step into his role, and in 1972 she officially took office. She appointed numerous women to positions within the council, partly as a strategy to address the challenges of men working under her leadership. Throughout her tenure, the council secured grants from the Prime Minister's adviser on Arab affairs, and the ties with the neighboring kibbutz, Yehiam, were notably strengthened. Despite her accomplishments, she was removed from her position after approximately a year and a half. In the 1978 elections, she ran independently, securing one seat and becoming the first woman elected to an Arab local council in Israel. Violet Khoury served on the council for 14 years.
