= Al-Buqay'a =

Al-Buqay'a, also spelled al-Buqei'a, may refer to the following places:

- Al-Buqay'a, the Arabic name for the Homs Gap in Syria and Lebanon.
- Al-Buqay'a, the Arabic name for the mostly Druze village of Peki'in in northern Israel.
- Al-Bikai'a, a cluster of villages in the State of Palestine.
