= Kafr Yasif =

Arab village in Northern Israel

Kafr Yasif: כַּפְר יָסִיף, כפר יאסיף; كفر ياسيف
- Local council (from 1925)

Hebrew transcription(s)
  - ISO 259: Kpar Yasip
  - Also spelled: Kafar Yasif (official); Kfar Yasif (unofficial)
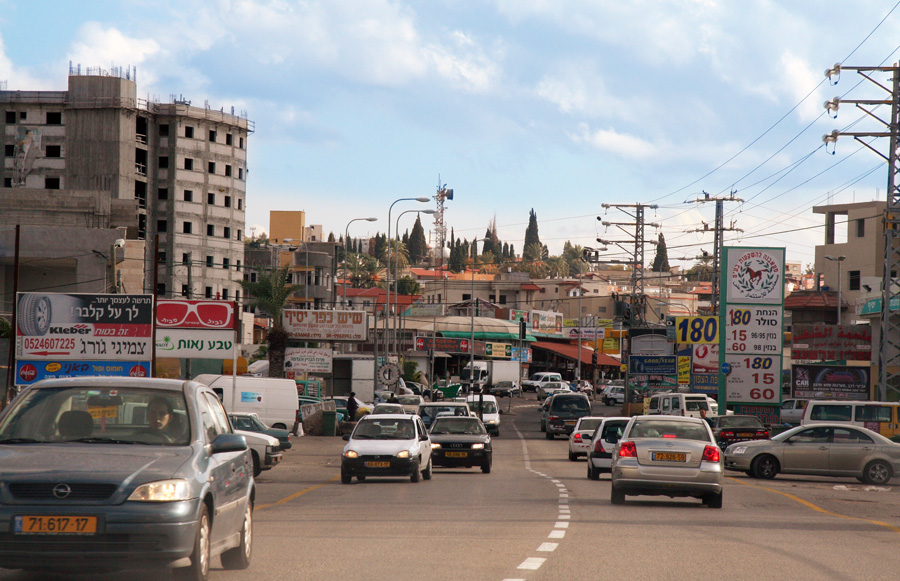
- A street scene in Kafr Yasif, 2006

- Location within Northwest Israel Location within Israel
- Coordinates: 32°57′17″N 35°9′55″E
- Grid position: 165/262 PAL
- Country: Israel
- District: Northern
- Subdistrict: Acre
- Natural Region: Nahariya

Government
  - Head of Municipality: Shadi Shweiry

Area
  - Total: 3,194 dunams (3.194 km^{2}; 1.233 sq mi)

Population (2024)
  - Total: 10,526
  - Density: 3,296/km^{2} (8,535/sq mi)

Ethnicity
  - Arabs: 99.8%
  - Jews and others: 0.2%
- Name meaning: "Village of Yasif"

Kafr Yasif (Arabic: كفر ياسيف, Kufr Yasīf; Hebrew: כַּפְר יָסִיף) is an Arab town in the Northern District of Israel. It is located 11 kilometers (6.8 mi) northeast of the city of Acre and adjacent to Abu Snan and Yarka. The population of Kafr Yasif is Christian, Muslim and Druze. In 2022, 52.4% of the population was Christian, 44.9% Muslim and 2.7% Druze.

== History ==
Many ancient remains have been excavated at Kafr Yasif, including mosaic floors, Corinthian columns, and cisterns cut in rock. Remains dating to the Persian, Hellenistic (4th-3rd centuries BCE) and Roman periods have been found here.

=== Roman and Byzantine empires ===
According to a tradition from Kafr Yasif, cited by F.M. Abel, the village was named Kefar Akko, lit. 'Akko village', until Josephus fortified it and named it after himself.

Remains dating to the Byzantine and Early Islamic (Umayyad/Abbasid) periods have been found here. Furnaces used in the manufacture of glass; starting in the Byzantine (or possibly Roman) period and continuing into the Umayyad/Abbasid (fifth–seventh centuries CE) era have been found here.

=== Crusader period ===
Remains dating to the Crusader and Mamluk periods have been found in Kafr Yasif.

During the Crusader period, it was known as Cafresi, Cafriasif, or Cafriasim. In 1193, Queen Isabella I and her spouse Henry II of Champagne granted the casale of Kafr Yasif to prior Heinrich of the Teutonic Knights. In the 13th century it was inhabited by Christians and paid tithes to the Bishop of Acre. In 1257 Kafr Yasif appears in a document relating to a disagreement between the Bishop of Acre and the Teutonic Knights about its income. At one point it was a casale of the Knights Hospitallers. It was part of the domain of the Crusaders during the hudna (truce) between the Crusaders based in Acre and the Mamluk sultan Qalawun in 1283.

=== Ottoman period ===
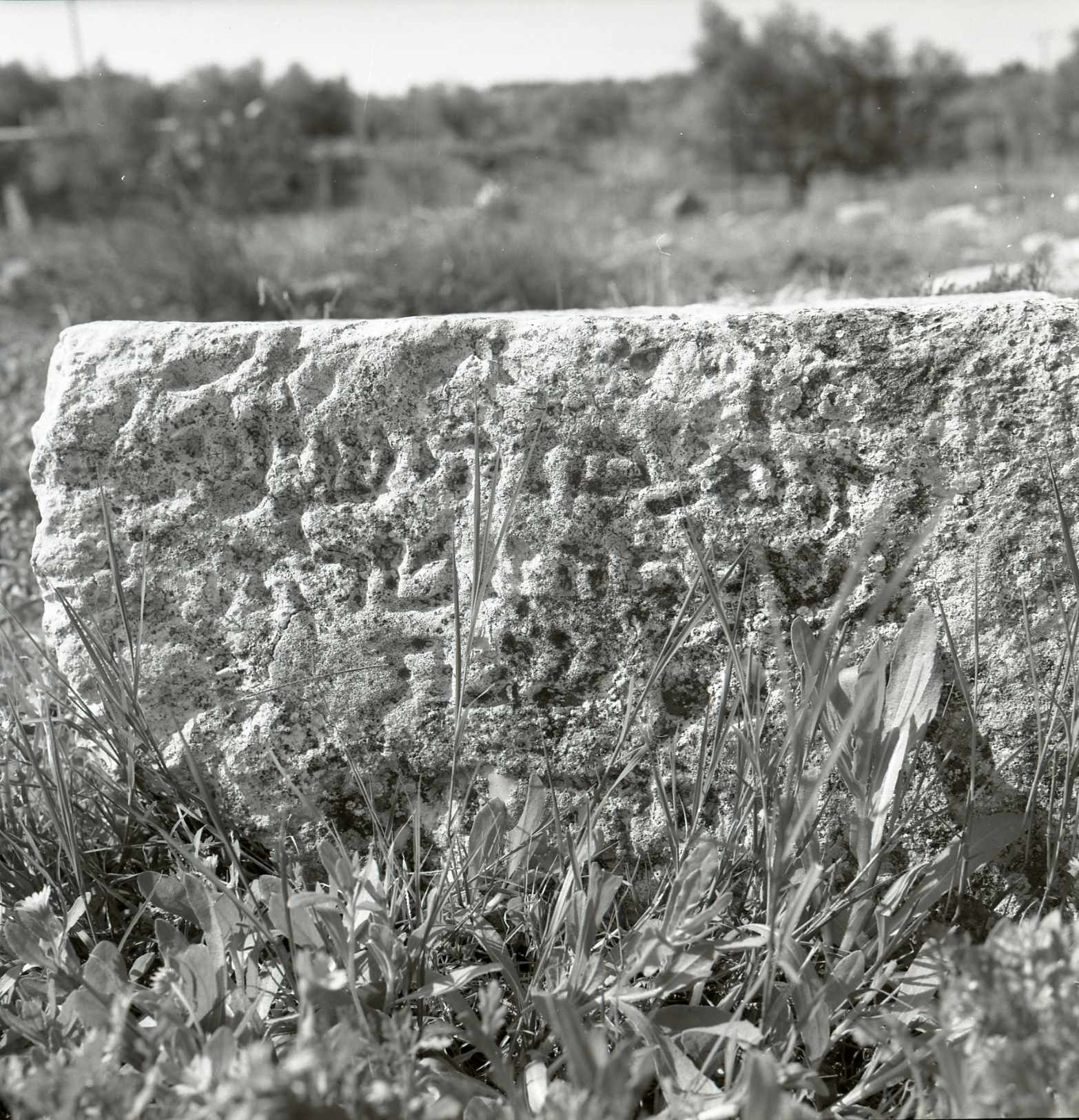
Ancient Jewish tombstone from Kfar Yasif

In the Ottoman era, the main crops were olives and cotton. Ottoman tax records from 1596 showed that Kafr Yasif, part of the Safed Sanjak, had a population of 58 Muslim households, seven Muslim bachelors and 19 Jewish households. The villagers paid a fixed tax-rate of 25% on various agricultural products, including wheat, barley, fruit trees, cotton, goats and beehives, winter pastures, jizya (poll tax), in addition to "occasional revenues"; a total of 12,877 akçe. All of the revenue went to a waqf. In 1618 the Druze governor of Safed Fakhr al-Din Ma'n destroyed the home of the Shia Muslim notable Ahmad Quraytim in Kafr Yasif because Quraytim had joined forces with Fakhr al-Din's rival, the governor of Lajjun Sanjak, Ahmad Turabay.

Kafr Yasif and its surrounding villages in the Sahil Akka (plain of Acre) district were controlled by a local sheikh, Najm, in the first decade or so of the 18th century. Its cotton crop was sold to the Dutch merchant Paul Maashoek. In the 1740s, ten Jewish households under the spiritual leadership of Rabbi Soloman Abadi settled in Kafr Yasif and were joined by Jews, who left Safad in the early 1760s as a result of the 1759 earthquakes. According to Jewish travelers, the Jews in Kafr Yasif lived well under Daher al-Umar, the Arab strongman of the Galilee (1730–1775), who allowed Jews to settle there. According to a map by Pierre Jacotin from Napoleon's invasion of 1799 the place was known as Koufour Youcef.

In 1838, Kafr Yasif had a Greek Orthodox Christian majority with Muslim and Druze minorities. In 1880 the village had a population of about 600, of which 500 were Greek Orthodox Christians and 100 were Muslims. A church stood in the village, dated by Guèrin to c. 1740 and its iconostasis contained a number of icons provided by Russia. A stone-cut well, stone reservoirs and troughs, and a stone tower decorated by a carved cross, remaining from a larger fortification, were also to be seen. According to the Palestine Exploration Fund's Survey of Western Palestine, Kafr Yasif was a stone-built village surrounded by olive groves and arable land, and provided with water from cisterns. The population consisted of 300 Christians, who worshiped at the Greek Orthodox chapel, and 50 Druzes. A population list from about 1887 showed that Kafr Yasif had about 910 inhabitants; three quarters Greek Catholic Christians, one quarter Muslim.

=== British Mandate period ===
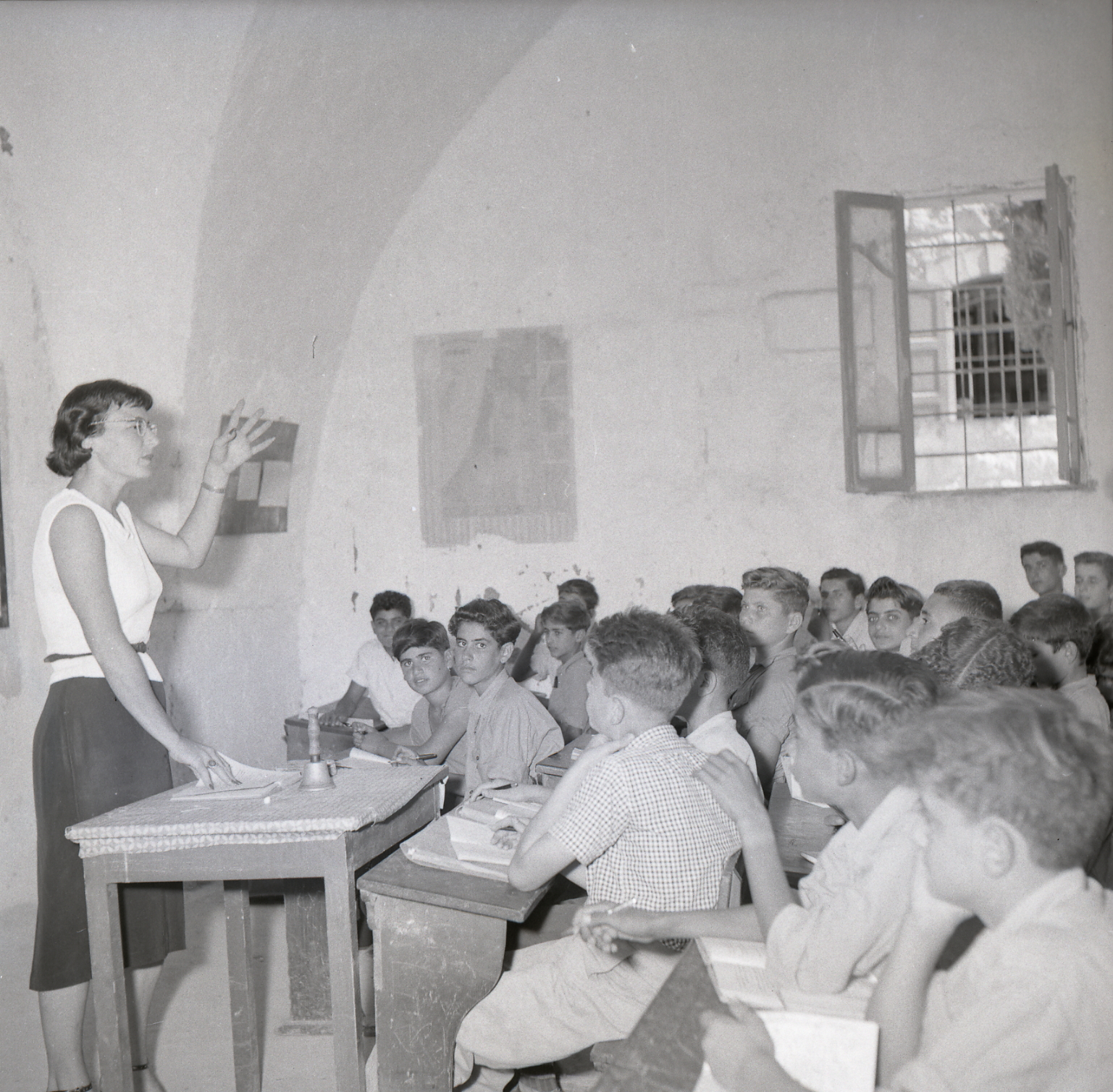
School in Kafr Yasif, 1950

In the 1922 census of Palestine conducted by the British Mandate authorities, Kafr Yasif is listed with a population of 870 residents; 665 Christians, 172 Muslims and 33 Druze. On 1 December 1925, Kafr Yasif became one of the few Arab villages in the Galilee to receive local-council status during the British mandate period. Yani Kustandi Yani served as mayor from 1933 to 1948. The 1931 census of Palestine recorded Kafr Yasif's population as 1,057.

On 14–17 February 1939, during the Arab revolt in Palestine, a group of Palestinian Arab rebels planted a mine on the road near Kafr Yasif which blew up a British vehicle, killing nine soldiers (according to the Arabs) or one soldier and wounding two others (according to the British). The British Army proceeded setting ablaze homes in Kafr Yasif as punishment, burning between 68 and 72 homes before being informed by local residents that Kuwaykat's inhabitants were responsible for the attack. The British troops fatally shot nine Arabs from the direction of Kuwaykat as they approached the village. In compensation, the town was rebuilt by the British with a school and a city hall which are still in use today. According to a British chaplain, "The people at Kafr Yasif were very eager to point out that the troops who destroyed their houses were not English but Irish."

In the 1945 statistics, an official land and population survey, Kafr Yasif had a population of 1,400: 350 were Muslim, 1,105 Christians, and 40 were listed as "other" (Druze). The village owned 6,763 dunams of land, of which 3,234 were plantations and irrigable land, on 3,310 they grew cereals, while 75 dunams were built-up (urban) land.

=== Israel ===
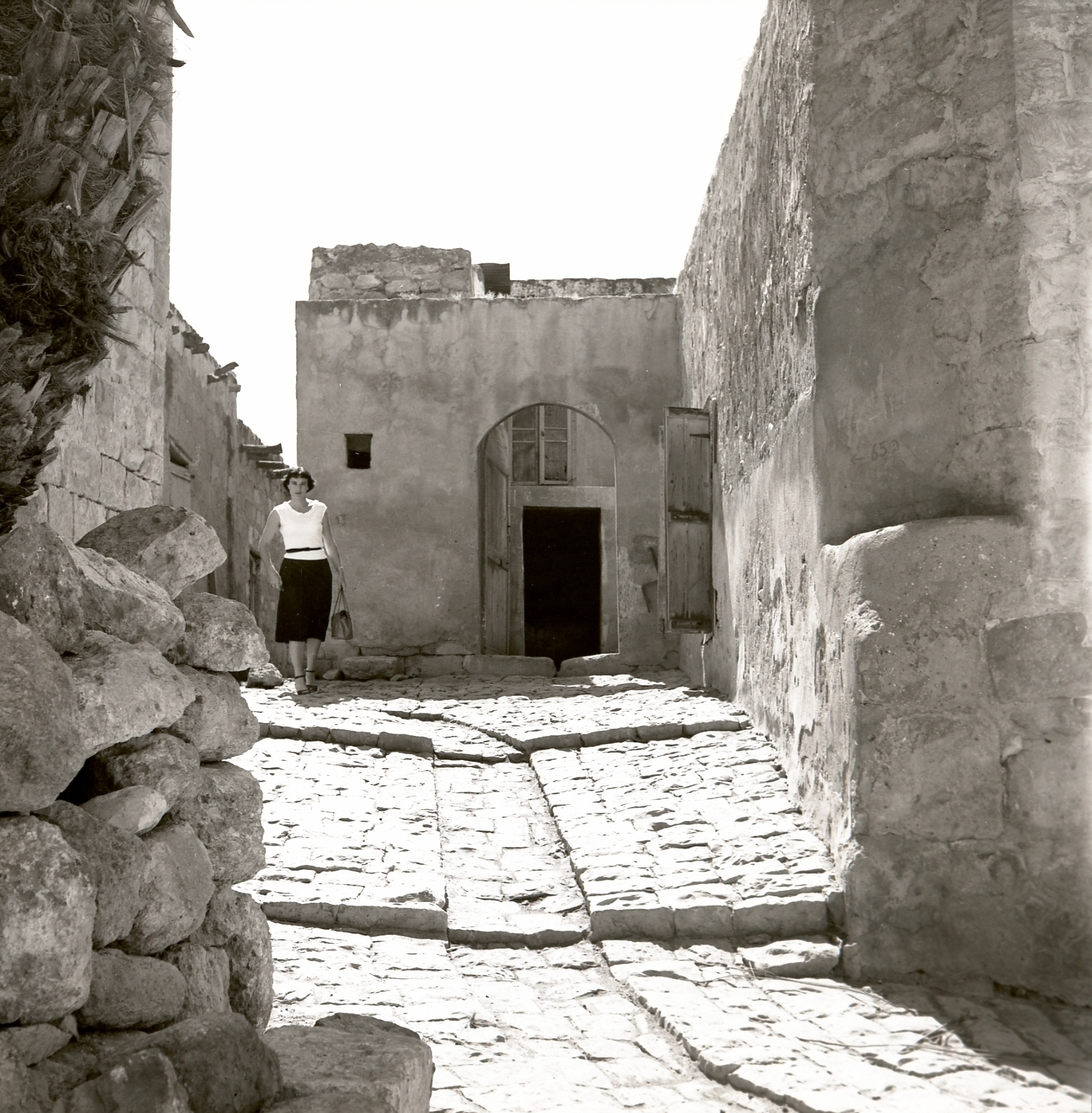
An alleyway in Kafr Yasif, 1952, four years after its capture by Israeli forces

On 8–14 July 1948, during the 1948 Arab-Israeli War, the Carmeli Brigade and the 7th Armored Brigade occupied Kafr Yasif as part of the first stage of Operation Dekel. The mayor, Yani Yani, leveraged his contacts with the Druze Ma'di family of neighboring Yirka, which maintained friendly ties with the Israelis, to sign a surrender agreement mediated by the Israeli officer Haim Orbach on 10 July preventing the expulsion of the village's residents. Unlike in many other captured Arab towns, the majority of the population remained, and about 700 inhabitants of nearby villages, especially al-Birwa, al-Manshiyya, and Kuwaykat, took refuge there. On 28 February 1949, most of them were put into trucks and driven to the front lines, where they were forced to cross the frontier border into Lebanon. On 1 March, another 250 refugees were deported. Knesset member Tawfik Toubi strongly protested these expulsions.

Kafr Yasif is one of the few Arab towns in the Galilee that retained most of the land it held before 1948. Of 673 hectares owned in 1945, 458 hectares remained in 1962, with 76 hectares expropriated in 1952–1953. On 5 June 1951, the Israeli government reactivated the local council in the only example of an Arab local council that continuously existed after 1948. In the first elections, held in 1954, the former mayor Yani Yani was re-elected mayor as head of a Communist Party and Nationalist Group (Kafr Yassif List) coalition, defeating the Mapai candidate. Yani remained in office until his death in 1962. He became leader of the Arab Popular Front, which evolved into the Al Ard movement. The APF campaigned for the protection of waqf properties in Israel. In 1972–1973, Violet Khoury was elected mayor of Kafr Yasif, making her the first Arab woman to head a local council in Israel. The population remained under martial law until 1966.

The first meeting of the Congress of Druze Intellectuals took place in Kafr Yasif on 26 August 1966. The initiative behind the formation of the congress came from the youth of Druze villages in the Galilee, led by Salman Faraj. When the Druze leadership in the Department of Minority Affairs gained knowledge of the congress's planned meeting and failed to persuade Faraj to postpone it, the spiritual head of the Druze community, Sheikh Amin Tarif locked the gates of the al-Khadr shrine, where the meeting was to be held. The congress was instead held in a nearby house in the town and one of the clauses of the summit expressed Druze solidarity with the other Arab communities of Israel.

Kafr Yasif became the site of the first major violent incident between Christians and Druze in Israel on 11 April 1981. The clash began during a football match between fans of the town's local team and that of the nearby Druze village of Julis; a young man from Julis was fatally stabbed by a Christian from Kafr Yasif. Although reconciliation talks were immediately arranged to prevent further violence, the local council of Kafr Yasif refused to give up the name of the alleged killer. Hundreds of Druze youths from Julis subsequently entered Kafr Yasif, prompting the mayor to call for emergency back-up from the regional police, a request which was denied. On 13 April, about 60 armed police officers positioned themselves in the field between the two villages, and while a sulha (traditional Arab peace agreement) was being negotiated, a group of heavily armed Julis residents stormed the town, burning down 85 houses, 17 stores, a few workshops and 31 cars. A church was also damaged. By the end of the attack three residents of Kafr Yasif had been shot dead and more were wounded. The police did not intervene, with some officers claiming they were not sufficiently armed. None of the attackers, which according to witnesses included some off-duty Druze soldiers from the Israeli Army, were arrested. Most of the compensation for the damage came from the Muslim waqf of Israel and a smaller portion from the World Council of Churches.

== Demographics ==
Historical population
Year	Pop.	±%
1972	3,700	—
1983	5,100	+37.8%
1995	6,800	+33.3%
2008	8,600	+26.5%
2022	10,574	+23.0%
2024	10,527	−0.4%

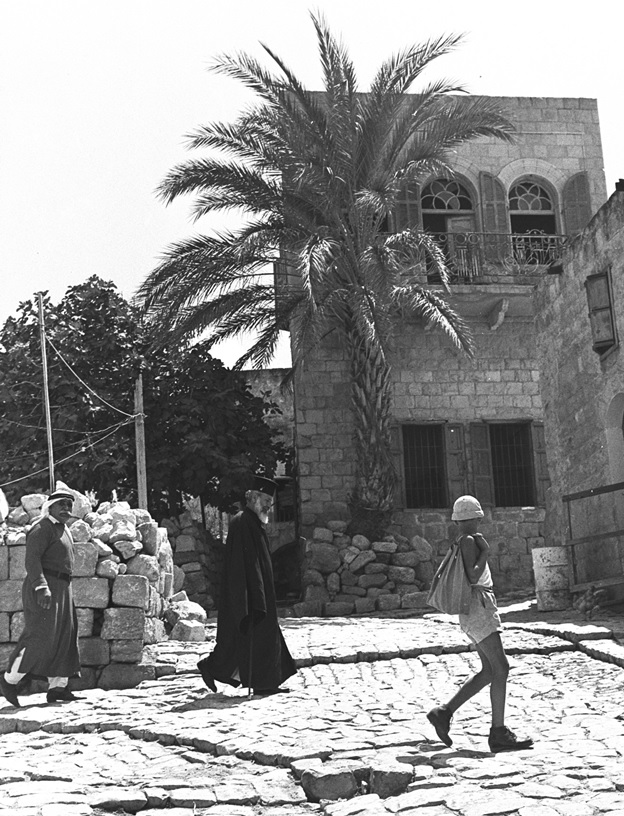
A local Greek Orthodox priest (center) in Kafr Yasif, 1950

Kafr Yasif's population was 1,730 in 1950, of which 300 were internally displaced Palestinians and were 60 Druze. In 1951, 27% of Kafr Yasif's 1,930 inhabitants were internally displaced. In the 1961 census there were 2,975 inhabitants (1,747 Christians, 1,138 Muslims and 90 Druzes). In 1995 the population was recorded as 6,700.

In the 2009 census Kafr Yasif had a population of 8,700, with Christians accounting for 56% of the inhabitants, Muslims 40% and Druze 4%.

The largest family in Kafr Yasif is the Safiah.

== Landmarks ==
It is popular belief that the tomb of the monotheistic saint, al-Khadr is located in Kafr Yasif. The site is especially venerated by the Druze, some of whom make annual pilgrimages to the tomb on January 25. The structure is composed of a large convention hall adjacent to the tomb, along with rooms and courtyards that serve both pilgrims and other visitors. Al-Khadr is the Arabic name for Saint George in Christianity. There are four churches and two mosques in the town. The main bishop of the town's Orthodox Christian community is Atallah Makhouli.

== Culture and education ==
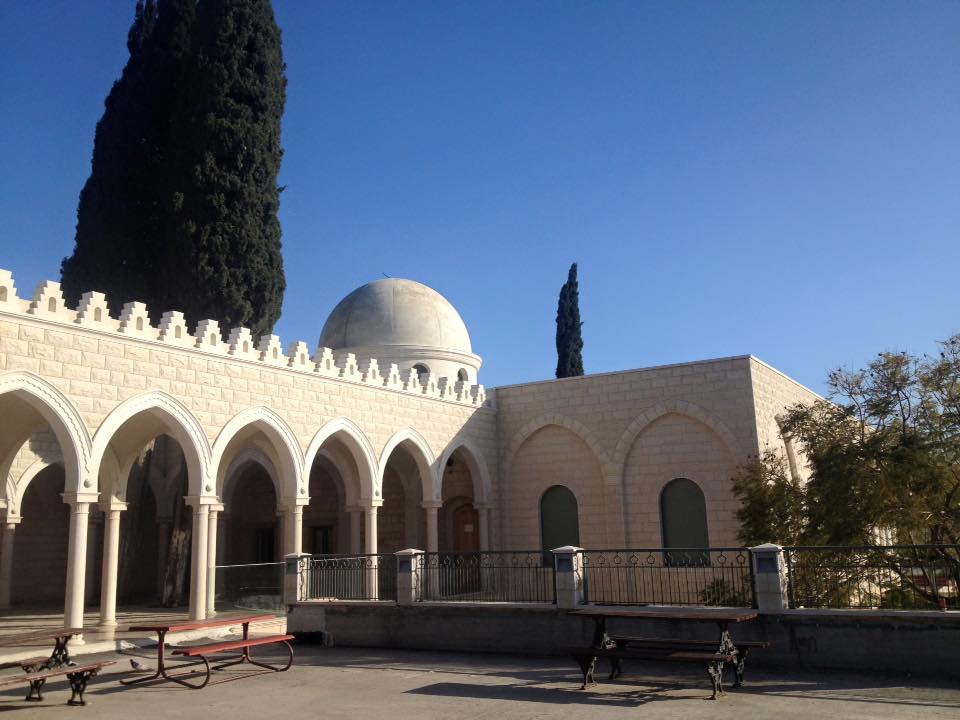
Druze Maqam Al-Khidr in Kafr Yasif.

According to the historian Atallah Mansour, Kafr Yasif is the "most academic Arab town in Israel", while journalist Sylvia Smith calls it "the preeminent [Arab] cultural town". With the near total depopulation of the Palestinian Arabs in the major cities of Haifa and Jaffa as a result of the 1948 war, Kafr Yasif became one of a few villages in the newly established state of Israel to emerge as a central space for Arab culture and politics. Its schools, proximity and location between major cities and other Arab villages, the relatively equal distribution of land ownership among its households and the diversity brought about by the influx of internally displaced Palestinians all contributed to its local importance. In 1948 it was the only Arab locality in the Galilee to contain a high school outside of the cities of Nazareth, Shefa-Amr and Haifa. Following the war, the high school enrolled students from over fifty Arab villages. Several students, including Mahmoud Darwish, became well-known poets, and the village hosted weekly poetry recitals.

The Rabeah Murkus Dance Studio, Israel's first Arab dance studio, is located in Kafr Yasif. Rabeah Murkus, daughter of former Kafr Yasif mayor Nimr Murkus, also opened a dance study track for Arab high school students authorized by the Israeli Ministry of Education. The track serves 10th–12th graders in several Arab communities in northern Israel. A student of the dance studio, Ayman Safiah, born and raised in Kafr Yasif, became the first Palestinian male ballet dancer and, according to Israeli journalist Esti Ahronovitz, was "considered the first Arab classical-modern dancer". Several thousand mourners attended his funeral in Kafr Yasif on 28 May 2020.

== Voting Patterns ==
In the 2022 election, 91 percent of voters in Kafr Yasif voted for the Arab parties, while 5 percent voted for the parties of the center-left coalition led by Yair Lapid and 3 percent voted for the parties of the right-wing coalition led by Benjamin Netanyahu. Among the voters for the Arab parties, 59 percent voted for the Hadash–Ta'al list, while 32 percent voted for Balad and 9 percent voted for Ra'am.

In the 2026 election, 87 percent of voters in Kafr Yasif voted for the Arab parties, while 11 percent voted for the parties of the center-left coalition led by Gadi Eisenkot and 1.5 percent voted for the parties of the right-wing coalition led by Benjamin Netanyahu. Among the voters for the Arab parties, 87 percent voted for the Joint List, while 13 percent voted for Ra'am. Voter turnout increased 25 percent from the 2022 election.

== Notable people ==
- Violet Khoury
- Amal Murkus

== See also ==
- Arab localities in Israel

== Bibliography ==
- Abu-Husayn, Abdul-Rahim (1985). Provincial Leaderships in Syria, 1575–1650. Beirut: American University of Beirut. ISBN 9780815660729.
- Abu Raya, Rafeh (2010-06-02). "Kafr Yasif (A) Final Report". Hadashot Arkheologiyot – Excavations and Surveys in Israel (122).
- Abu Raya, Rafeh (2010-08-02). "Kafr Yasif (B) Final Report". Hadashot Arkheologiyot – Excavations and Surveys in Israel (122).
- Avi-Yonah, M. (1953). "The Missing Fortress of Flavius Josephus". Israel Exploration Journal. 3 (2): 94–98. JSTOR 27924515.
- Barag, Dan (1979). "A new source concerning the ultimate borders of the Latin Kingdom of Jerusalem". Israel Exploration Journal. 29: 197–217.
- Barnay, Jacob (1992). The Jews in Palestine in the Eighteenth Century: Under the Patronage of the Istanbul committee of Officials for Palestine. University of Alabama Press. ISBN 9780817305727.
- Barron, J. B., ed. (1923). Palestine: Report and General Abstracts of the Census of 1922. Government of Palestine.
- Betts, Robert Brenton (1990). The Druze. Yale University Press. ISBN 0300048106.
- Cohen, Amnon (1973). Palestine in the 18th Century: Patterns of Government and Administration. Jerusalem: The Magnes Press. ISBN 978-0-19-647903-3.
- Conder, C.R.; Kitchener, H.H. (1881). The Survey of Western Palestine: Memoirs of the Topography, Orography, Hydrography, and Archaeology. Vol. 1. London: Committee of the Palestine Exploration Fund.
- Conder, C. R. (1890). "Norman Palestine". Quarterly Statement - Palestine Exploration Fund. 22: 29–37.
- Dana, Nissim (2003). The Druze in the Middle East: Their Faith, Leadership, Identity and Status. Sussex Academic Press. ISBN 9781903900369.
- Dauphin, C. (1998). La Palestine byzantine, Peuplement et Populations. BAR International Series 726 (in French). Vol. III : Catalogue. Oxford: Archeopress. ISBN 0-860549-05-4.
- Department of Statistics (1945). Village Statistics, April, 1945. Government of Palestine.
- Ellenblum, R. (2003). Frankish Rural Settlement in the Latin Kingdom of Jerusalem. Cambridge University Press. ISBN 9780521521871.
- Firro, Kais (1999). The Druzes in the Jewish State: A Brief History. BRILL. ISBN 9004112510.
- Guérin, V. (1880). Description Géographique Historique et Archéologique de la Palestine (in French). Vol. 3: Galilee, pt. 2. Paris: L'Imprimerie Nationale.
- Hadawi, S. (1970). Village Statistics of 1945: A Classification of Land and Area ownership in Palestine. Palestine Liberation Organization Research Center.
- Herzog, H. (1999). Gendering politics: Women in Israel. University of Michigan Press. ISBN 0472109456.
- Hütteroth, W.-D.; Abdulfattah, K. (1977). Historical Geography of Palestine, Transjordan and Southern Syria in the Late 16th Century. Erlanger Geographische Arbeiten, Sonderband 5. Erlangen, Germany: Vorstand der Fränkischen Geographischen Gesellschaft. ISBN 3-920405-41-2.
- Jiryis, S. (1968). The Arabs in Israel.
- Karmon, Y. (1960). "An Analysis of Jacotin's Map of Palestine" (PDF). Israel Exploration Journal. 10 (3, 4): 155–173, 244–253. Archived from the original (PDF) on 2019-12-22.
- Lewis, B. (1952). Notes and Documents from the Turkish Archives. Israel Oriental Society.
- Manna, Adel (2022). Nakba and Survival: The Story of Palestinians who Remained in Haifa and the Galilee, 1948-1956. Oakland: University of California Press. ISBN 9780520389366.
- Mansour, Atallah (2004). Narrow Gate Churches: The Christian Presence in the Holy Land Under Muslim and Jewish Rule. Hope Publishing House. ISBN 1932717021.
- Masalha, N.; Said, E. (2005). Catastrophe remembered: Israel and the Internal Refugees: Essays in Memory of Edward W. Said (1935-2003). Zed Books. ISBN 9781842776230.
- McGahern, Una (2011). Palestinian Christians in Israel: State Attitudes Towards Non-Muslims in a Jewish State. Routledge. ISBN 978-0415605717.
- Mills, E., ed. (1932). Census of Palestine 1931. Population of Villages, Towns and Administrative Areas. Jerusalem: Government of Palestine.
- Morris, B. (2004). The Birth of the Palestinian Refugee Problem Revisited. Cambridge University Press. ISBN 0-521-00967-7.
- Palmer, E.H. (1881). The Survey of Western Palestine: Arabic and English Name Lists Collected During the Survey by Lieutenants Conder and Kitchener, R. E. Transliterated and Explained by E.H. Palmer. Committee of the Palestine Exploration Fund.
- Pringle, D. (1997). Secular buildings in the Crusader Kingdom of Jerusalem: an archaeological Gazetter. Cambridge University Press. ISBN 0521-46010-7.
- Pringle, D. (2009). The Churches of the Crusader Kingdom of Jerusalem: The cities of Acre and Tyre with Addenda and Corrigenda to Volumes I-III. Vol. IV. Cambridge University Press. ISBN 978-0-521-85148-0.
- Robinson, E.; Smith, E. (1841). Biblical Researches in Palestine, Mount Sinai and Arabia Petraea: A Journal of Travels in the year 1838. Vol. 3. Boston: Crocker & Brewster.
- Room, A. (2006). Placenames of the World: Origins and Meanings of the Names for 6,600 Countries, Cities, Territories, Natural Features, and Historic Sites. McFarland. ISBN 0786422483.
- Rhode, H. (1979). Administration and Population of the Sancak of Safed in the Sixteenth Century (PhD). Columbia University. Archived from the original on 2020-03-01.
- Röhricht, R. (1893). (RRH) Regesta regni Hierosolymitani (MXCVII-MCCXCI) (in Latin). Berlin: Libraria Academica Wageriana.
- Schumacher, G. (1888). "Population list of the Liwa of Akka". Quarterly Statement - Palestine Exploration Fund. 20: 169–191.
- Shihade, Magid (Spring 2014). "Not just a Picnic: Settler Colonialism, Mobility and Identity among Palestinians in Israel". Biography. 37 (2): 451–473. doi:10.1353/bio.2014.0016. JSTOR 24570188. S2CID 162670570.
- Streger, Juan Alejo Sánchez (2020-07-12). "Kafr Yasif (A)". Hadashot Arkheologiyot – Excavations and Surveys in Israel (132).
- Streger, Juan Alejo Sánchez (2020-12-13). "Kafr Yasif (B)". Hadashot Arkheologiyot – Excavations and Surveys in Israel (132).
- Strehlke, E., ed. (1869). Tabulae Ordinis Theutonici ex tabularii regii Berolinensis codice potissimum. Berlin: Weidmanns.
- Swedenburg, Ted (2003). Memories of Revolt: The 1936-1939 Rebellion and the Palestinian National Past. University of Arkansas Press. ISBN 1557287635.
- ‘Uqsa, Hanaa Aboud-Abu (2021-06-15). "Kafr Yasif". Hadashot Arkheologiyot – Excavations and Surveys in Israel (133).
- Zedan, Adnan (2017-12-06). "Kafr Yasif". Hadashot Arkheologiyot – Excavations and Surveys in Israel (129).
