= Kaukab Abu al-Hija =

Place in Israel

Kaukab Abu al-Hija: כַּוּכַּבּ/כַּוַכַּב/כאוכב אַבּוּ אל-הִיגַ'א; كوكب أبو الهيجا
- Local council (from 1984)

Hebrew transcription(s)
  - ISO 259: Kawkaḅ ˀabu ˀel-Hiǧaˀ
  - Also spelled: Kaokab Abu Al-Hija (official); Kawkab Abu al-Heija (unofficial)
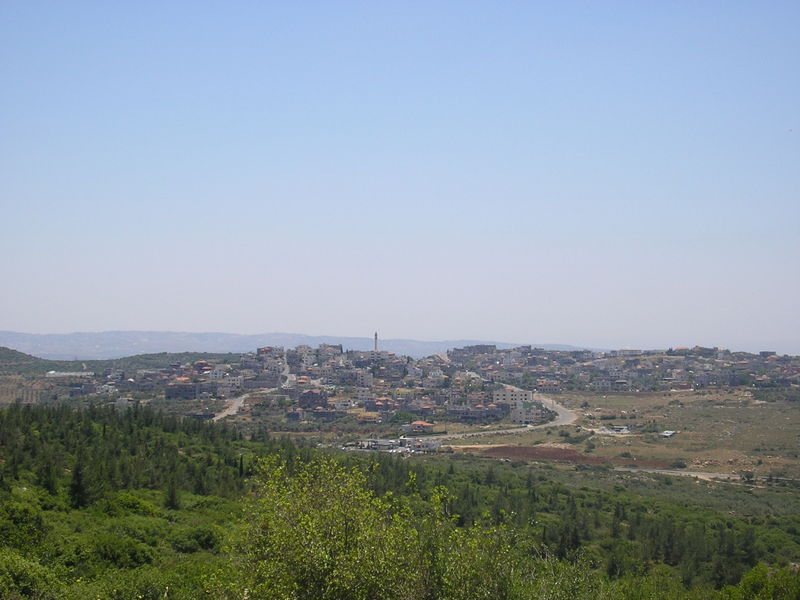

- Location within Northwest Israel Location within Israel
- Coordinates: 32°49′53″N 35°14′55″E
- Grid position: 173/248 PAL
- Country: Israel
- District: Northern
- Subdistrict: Acre
- Natural Region: Shefar'am

Government
  - Head of Municipality: Zaher Saleh

Area
  - Total: 2,567 dunams (2.567 km^{2}; 0.991 sq mi)

Population (2024)
  - Total: 4,037
  - Density: 1,573/km^{2} (4,073/sq mi)
- Name meaning: Abu al-Hija's Star

Kaukab Abu al-Hija (Arabic: كوكب أبو الهيجا; Hebrew: כַּוּכַּבּ אַבּוּ אל-הִיגַ'א), often simply Kaukab, (meaning "star" in Arabic), is an Arab Muslim village and local council in the Northern District of Israel, in the Lower Galilee. It is located on Road 784, between Shefa-'Amr and Karmiel, and north of Kafr Manda. Kaukab was historically under the control of the Abu al-Hija family of the Galilee.

Kaukab Abu al-Hija is named after Hussam ad-Din Abu al-Hija, a Kurd from Iraq and one of Saladin's most trusted Generals By tradition the residents today still claim to be blood relations of al-Hija.

In 2024 it had a population of 4,037, and in 2008 was ranked low (3/10) on the Israeli socio-economic scale. Its jurisdiction is 2,567 dunams. In 2022, 99.9% of the population was Muslim and 0.1% was Christian.

== History ==
It is possible to discern the ruins of Greek, Roman, and Byzantine settlements on Kaukab's location, and it might be the location of the town Kokhva, mentioned in the Talmud, however, many places in the area shared the name, and one cannot know which one was Kokhva.

=== Ayyubid Sultanate ===
Kaukab was founded next to a grave attributed to Husam al-Din Abu'l-Hayja, one of Saladin's generals, and is holy to the local Muslims. It is thus named Kaukab Abu al-Hija to differentiate it from several other Arab villages with the same name.

The village was one of the "Al-Hija" villages founded by relatives of Abu'l-Hayja. Abu'l-Hayja was an Iraqi Kurd and commander of the Kurdish forces that took part in Sultan Saladin's conquest of the Crusader Kingdom of Jerusalem in the 1180s. He was renowned for his bravery, and commanded the garrison of Acre at the time of the Siege of Acre (1189–1192).

Abu'l-Hayja apparently returned to Iraq, but several members of his family remained in the country under orders from Saladin, and these family members settled on spacious tracts of land that they were granted in the Carmel region, in the Lower, Eastern and Western Galilee, and in the Hebron Highlands. Other al-Hija villages were Hadatha and Sirin in the Lower Galilee, Ruweis in Western Galilee, and Ein Hawd on Mount Carmel. By tradition the residents today still claim to be blood relations of al-Hija.

Abu'l-Hayja returned to Iraq after Saladin's conquest of Jerusalem in 1187, and he apparently died and was buried there. His relatives who stayed behind in Palestine however, very much aware of his fame, declared Kaukab to be his burial place.

=== Ottoman Empire ===
In 1517, the village was incorporated into the Ottoman Empire with the rest of Palestine, and in 1596 it appeared in the Ottoman tax registers under the name of Kawkab Bani Krad (lit. ''Kawkab of the Kurds'') as being in the nahiya (subdistrict) of Akka, part of Safad Sanjak, with a population of 41 households and 8 bachelors, all Muslim. It paid taxes on a number of crops, including wheat and barley, summer crops, fruit trees, as well as on goats and/or beehives; a total of 1,194 akçe. 1/6 of the revenue went to a Waqf.

In 1875, the French explorer Victor Guérin visited Kaukab, and described it as a small village with about 250 inhabitants, situated on a mountain at an altitude of 425 meters above the sea level. He also noted a waly dedicated to Sheikh Ali. "Wali" is the term used by 19th-century scholars for a maqam, a Muslim shrine or mausoleum dedicated to a holy man

A population list from about 1887 showed that Kaukab had about 110 Muslim inhabitants.

=== British Mandate ===
In the 1922 census of Palestine, conducted by the British Mandate authorities, Kaukab had a total population of 222, all Muslim, which had increased in the 1931 census to 285, still all Muslim, in a total of 57 houses.

In 1938, during the 1936–1939 Arab revolt in Palestine, the village was destroyed and its threshing floors burnt by British troops during a revenge mission.

In the 1945 statistics, the population was 490, all Muslims, with 18,674 dunams of land, according to an official land and population survey. Of this, 332 dunams were for plantations and irrigable land, 1,657 for cereals, while 10 dunams were built-up land.

=== Israel ===
During Operation Hiram (29–31 October 1948) the village surrendered to the advancing Israeli army. Many of the villagers fled north but some stayed and were not expelled by the Israeli soldiers. The village remained under Martial Law until 1966.

In 1973, the population had grown to 1,340. Kaukab was declared a local council in 1984.

In 2020, a tender was offered by the Ministry of Tourism and Israel Land Administration for the construction of a hotel and tourist resort in the village. The compound includes a plan for 120 accommodation units and space for shops, pools, parks, sports fields and more. The decision was made in light of a rise in pilgrim tourism to Israel which creates new opportunities for the Galilee thanks to its religious, archeological and natural sites. Kaukab joins Shibli–Umm al-Ghanam, where a tender for hotel construction in a Bedouin village was offered for the first time in history.

== Landmarks ==
=== Shrine of Abu al-Hija ===
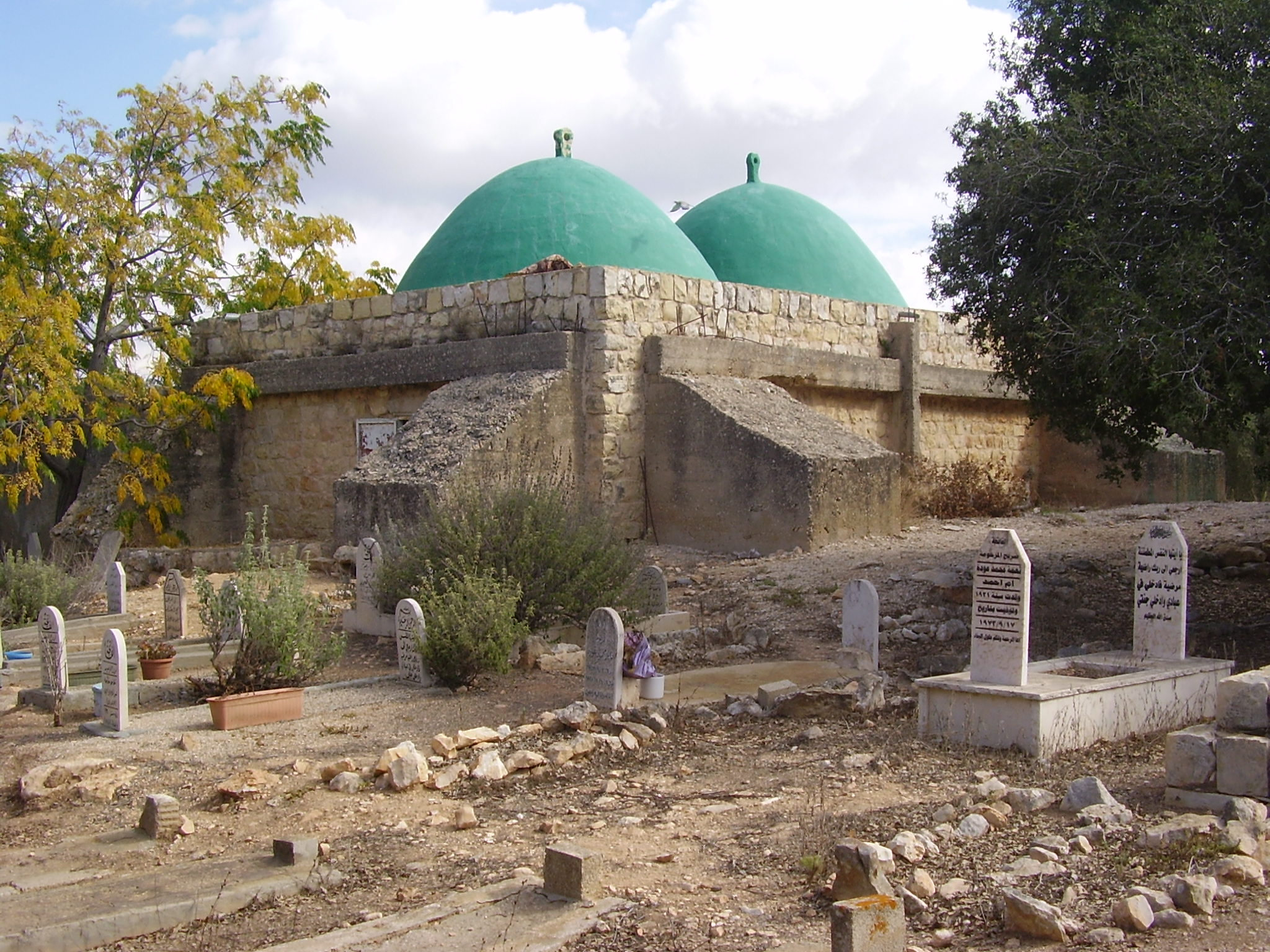
Maqam (shrine) of Abu al-Hija

To the north of the village is the traditional maqam (shrine) and tomb of Hassam Abu al-Hija (also spelled Abu al-Hayja), a two-domed structure with a courtyard to the north. In the rectangular courtyard, there are two cenotaphs, one on each side of the door entering the shine. The cenotaph to the west of the door belongs to Ali Badawi Abu al-Hija, who died in 1183 H (1769 CE), the one east of the door carries an inscription dated to 1181 H (1767–1768 CE). Entering the shrine is done into the eastern domed chamber. This is a prayer chamber, and has a mihrab (prayer niche) set into the south wall. The next chamber has two cenotaphs, one which belong to the founder of the al-Hija villages of the Galillee.

The village's cemetery surrounds the tomb. There are two other major tombs in the village: that of sheikhs Hassan and Sayeed, the latter a companion of Emir Hassam ad-Din al-Hija.

=== Sculptures for Peace ===
After the signing of the Oslo agreements in 1993, the idea of establishing a sculpture garden in Kaukab was initiated by Kaukab local council together with Beit Hagefen, the Arab-Jewish Centre in Haifa. The garden was dedicated to the concept of peace and coexistence. The sculpture garden extends over two hill tops with other pieces scattered around the village and its entrance. The sculptures were donated by Israeli Arab and Jewish artists, and Palestinian artists.

== Voting Patterns ==
In the 2026 election, 99 percent of voters in Kaukab Abu al-Hija voted for the Arab parties, while 0.4 percent voted for the parties of the center-left coalition led by Gadi Eisenkot and 0.1 percent voted for the parties of the right-wing coalition led by Benjamin Netanyahu. Among the voters for the Arab parties, 64 percent voted for the Joint List, while 36 percent voted for Ra'am. Voter turnout increased 49 percent from the 2022 election.

== See also ==
- Ein Hod, another village which developed on lands previously owned by Hussam al-Din Abu al-Hija's family
- Arab localities in Israel
