= Ein Hod =

Ein Hod: עֵין הוֹד (Hebrew)
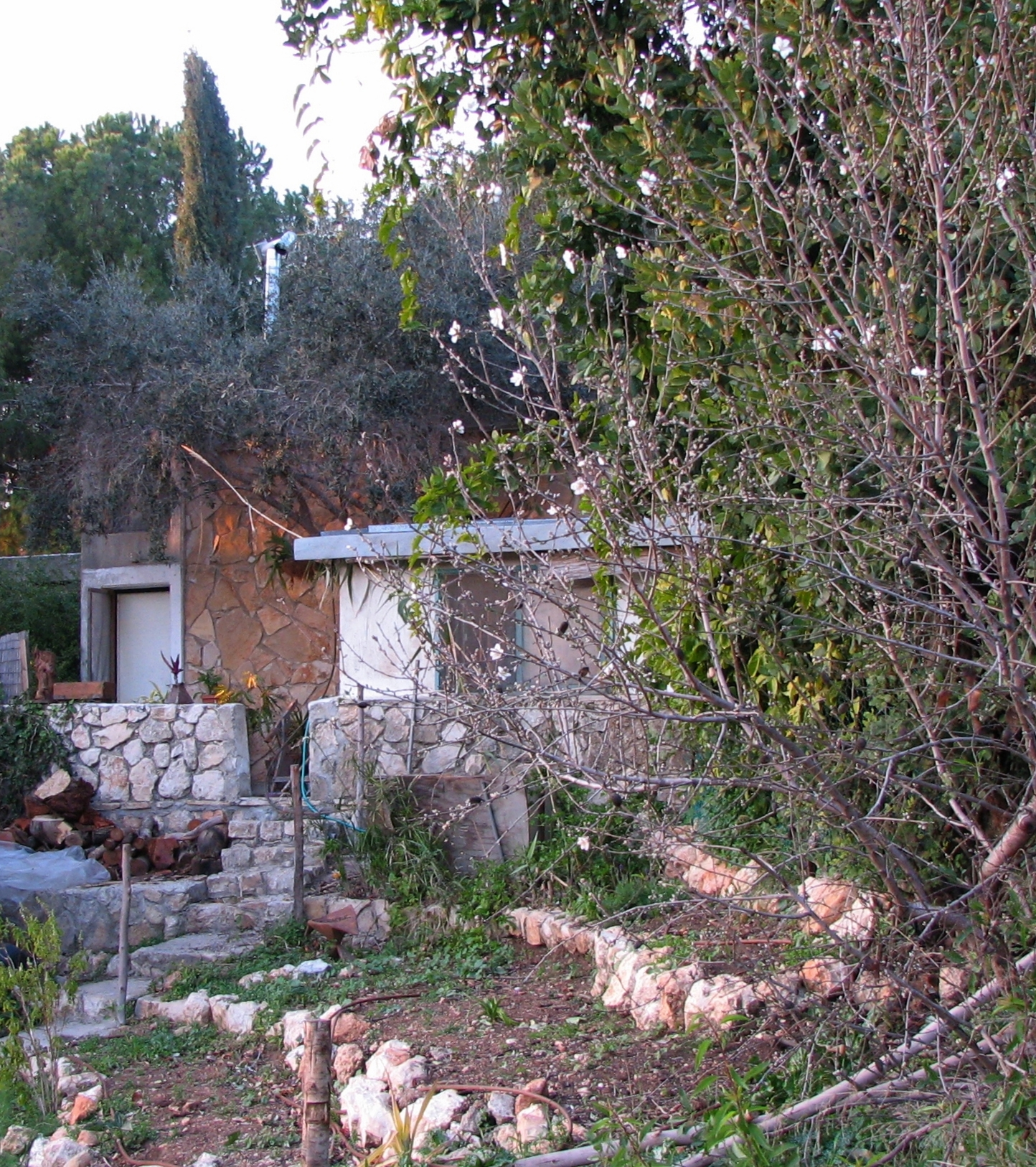

- Location within Haifa region of Israel Location within Israel
- Coordinates: 32°42′05″N 34°58′48″E
- Country: Israel
- District: Haifa
- Subdistrict: Hadera
- Council: Hof HaCarmel
- Population (2024): 605
- Website: ein-hod.org

Ayn Hawd عين حوض
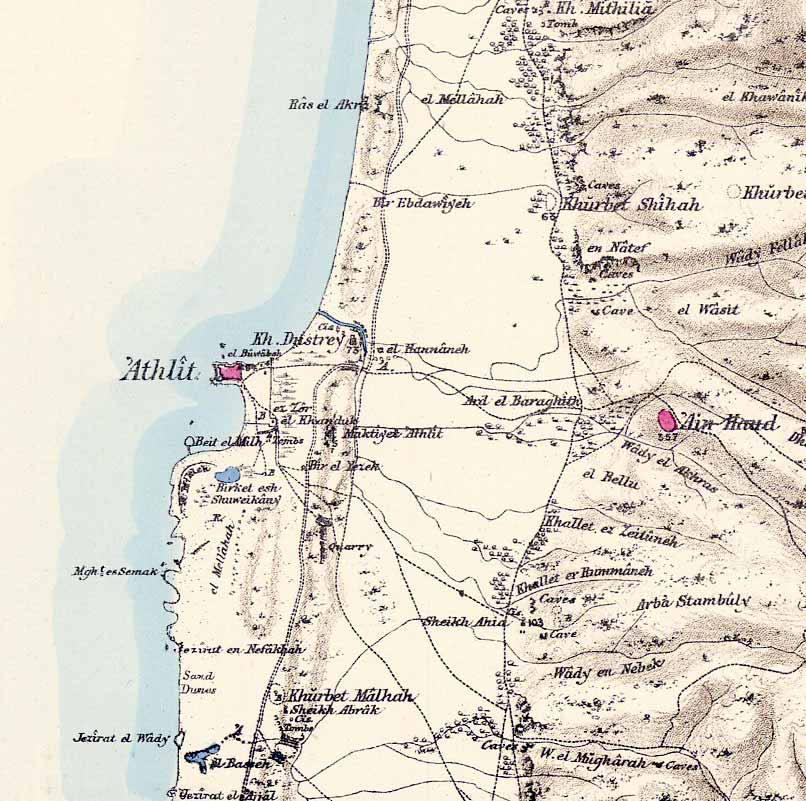
- Map of Ayn Hawd and surrounding area, 1870s. The Survey of Western Palestine. London:Committee of the Palestine Exploration Fund
- Etymology: Spring of the cistern
- Location within Mandatory Palestine
- Coordinates: 32°42′05″N 34°58′48″E
- Palestine grid: 148/234
- Geopolitical entity: Mandatory Palestine
- Subdistrict: Haifa
- Date of depopulation: 15 July 1948

Area
  - Total: 12,605 dunams (12.605 km^{2}; 4.867 sq mi)

Population (1945)
  - Total: 650
- Cause(s) of depopulation: Military assault by Yishuv forces
- Current localities: Ein Hod Nir Etzion

Ein Hod (Hebrew: עֵין הוֹד, Arabic: عين حوض) is a village in Haifa District in northern Israel. Located at the foot of Mount Carmel and southeast of Haifa, it falls under the jurisdiction of Hof HaCarmel Regional Council and has the status of community settlement. In 2024 it had a population of 605.

The village is situated on a hillside amidst olive groves, with a view of the Mediterranean Sea. Prior to the 1948 Arab–Israeli War Ein Hod was the site of the Arab village of Ein Hawd. Most of the Arab inhabitants were expelled during the war, however some remained in the area and settled nearby, forming a new village, also by the name of Ein Hawd.

After a failed attempt to create a moshav on the site, Ein Hod became an artists' colony in 1953.

== History ==
=== Ayyubid Period ===
The village was one of the "Al-Hija" villages founded by relatives of Emir Hussam al-Din Abu al-Hija. Abu al-Hija ("the Daring") was an Iraqi Kurd and commander of the Kurdish forces that took part in Sultan Saladin's conquest of the Crusader Kingdom of Jerusalem in the 1180s. He was renowned for his bravery, and commanded the garrison of Acre at the time of the Siege of Acre (1189–1192).

Abu al-Hija apparently returned to Iraq, but several members of his family remained in the country under orders from Saladin, and these family members settled on spacious tracts of land that they were granted in the Carmel region, in the Lower, Eastern and Western Galilee, and in the Hebron Highlands. One of these land grants became the village of Ein Hawd. Other al-Hija villages were Hadatha and Sirin in the Lower Galilee, Ruweis and Kawkab in the Western Galilee. By tradition the remaining residents today still claim to be blood relations of al-Hija.

=== Ottoman Period ===
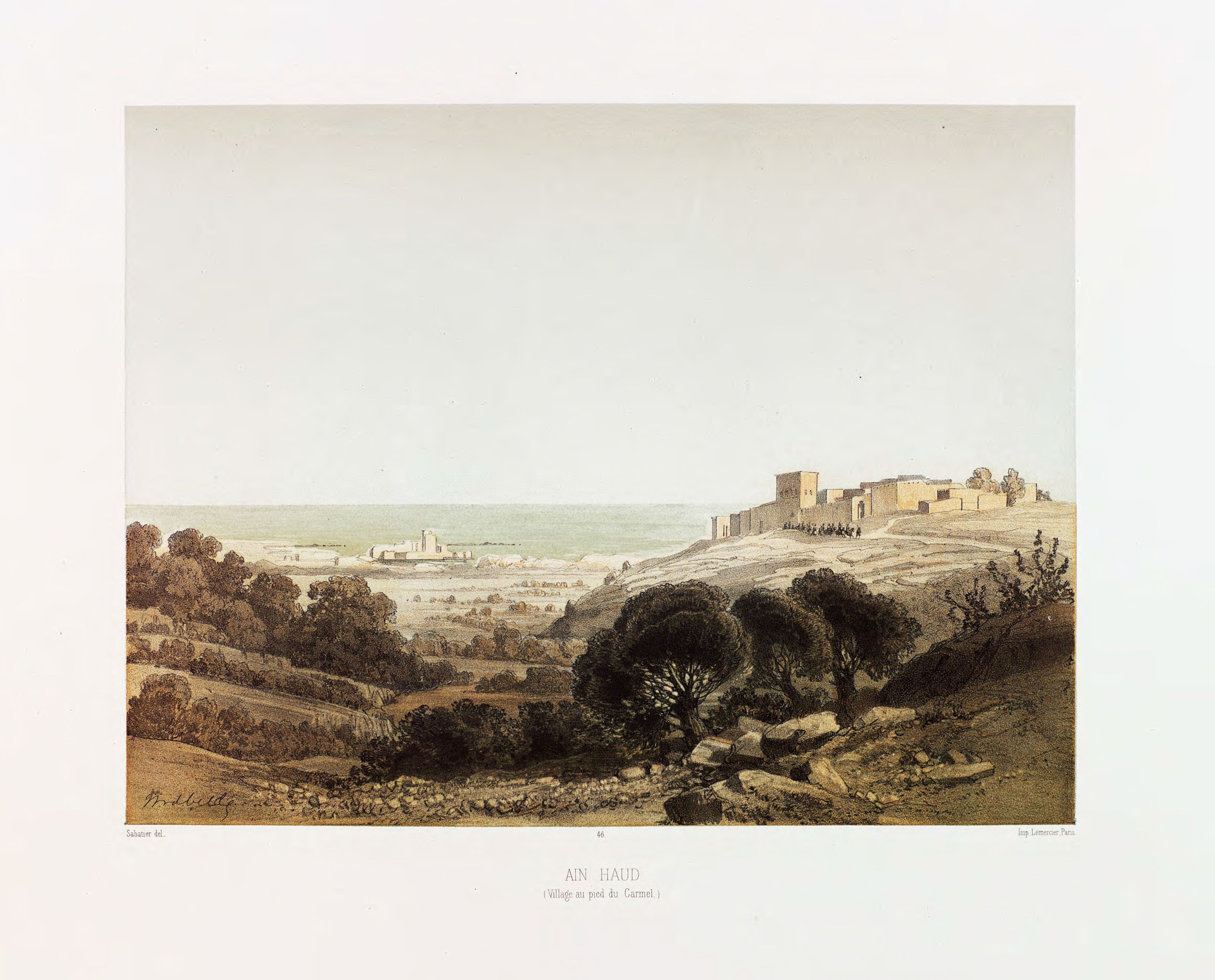
Ain-Haud in the 1850s, by van de Velde

In 1596, the village of Ayn Hawd was part of the Ottoman nahiya (subdistrict) of Sahil Atlit under the liwa' (district) of Lajjun with a population of 8 households, an estimated 44 persons, all Muslims. The villagers paid a fixed tax-rate of 25% on agricultural products, including wheat and barley, as well as on goats and beehives; a total of 2,650 akçe. All of the revenue went to a Waqf.

In 1851 van der Velde visited "Ain Haud" and "spent a pleasant evening in Shech Soleiman's house". Van der Velde describes how the villagers, all Muslim, were in great alarm over conscription to the Ottoman army. According to Shech Soleiman a former Sultan had given them a firman, exempting the villagers from conscription.

In 1870, Victor Guérin visited the village. He found it had 120 inhabitants, with houses built of rammed earth or different construction aggregates. The village was surrounded by a small wall.

In 1881, "Ain Haud" was described as a small village situated on the end of a spur, inhabited by fifty people who cultivated 3 faddans of land, while a population list from about 1887 showed that Ain Hod had about 195 inhabitants, all Muslim.

The village elementary school for boys was founded in 1888, and in the early twentieth century the number of inhabitants was given as 283. It was further noted that the village had a mosque.

=== British Mandate ===
In the 1922 census of Palestine, conducted by the British Mandate authorities, 'Ain Hud had a population of 350; 347 Muslims and 3 Christians, where the Christians were all Maronites. At the time of the 1931 census, the population of Ein Haud had increased to 459, all Muslims, in a total of 81 occupied houses.

In the 1945 statistics the population was 650, all Muslims, and it had a total of 12,605 dunams of land according to an official land and population survey. 1,503 dunams were for plantations and irrigable land, 4,422 for cereals, while 50 dunams were built-up (urban) land.

=== 1948 ===
Ayn Hawd and the neighboring village of Ayn Ghazal were attacked on the evening of 11 April 1948, according to the Palestinian newspaper Filastin, who reported that a group of 150 Jewish troops were unsuccessful in driving out the inhabitants. On 20 May, the Associated Press reported that another attack on Ayn Ghazal and Ayn Hawd had been thwarted.

During 17–19 July, IDF units attacked and occupied the villages of Ayn Hawd, together with Kafr Lam, Sarafand and al-Mazar, with Ayn Hawd being depopulated.

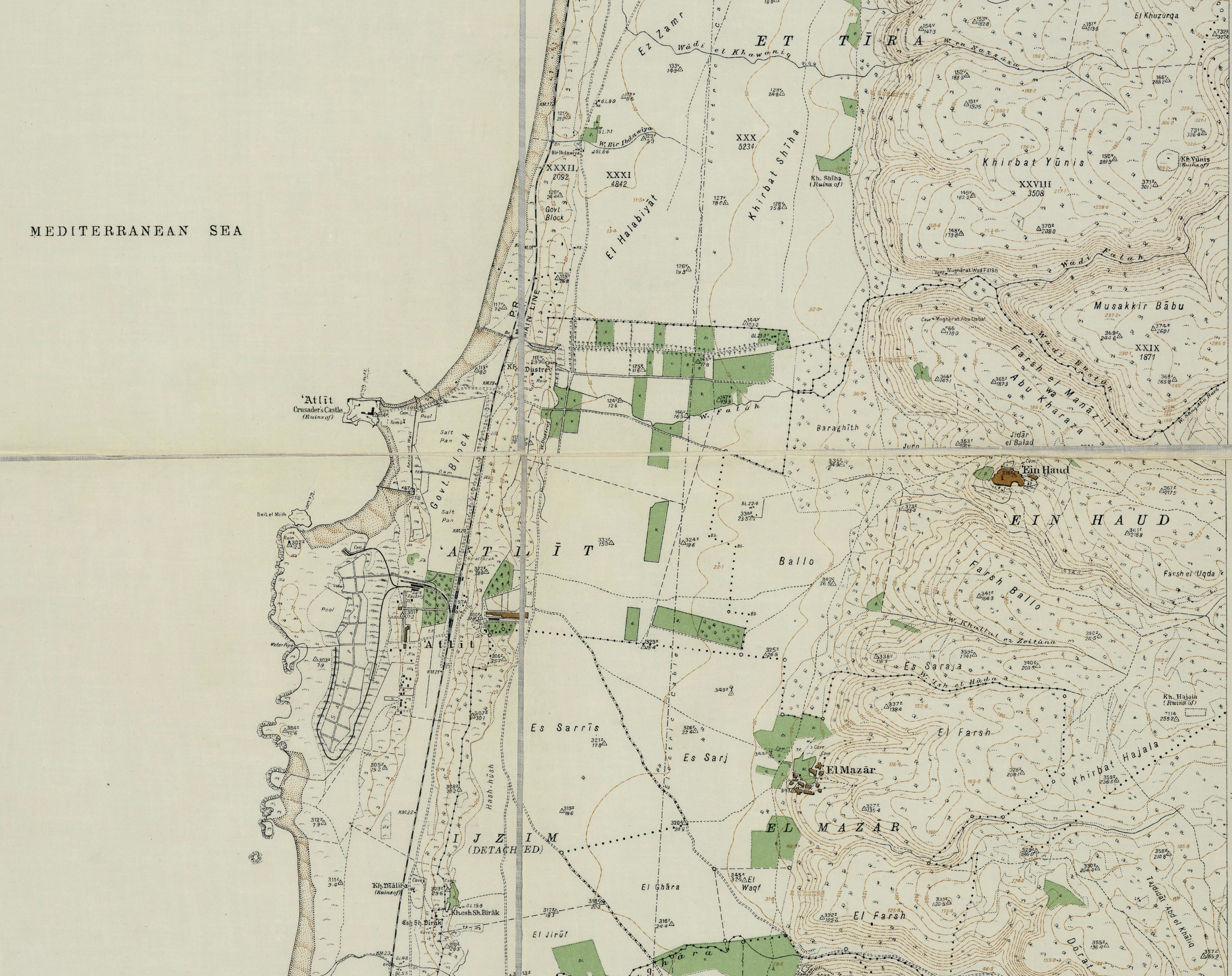
Ein Hod (Ein Haud) 1932 1:20,000

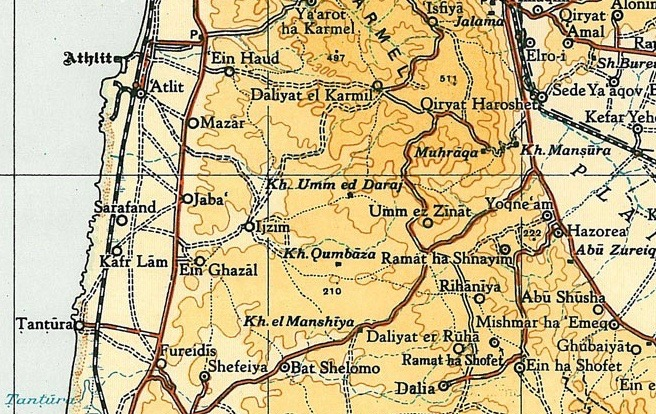
Ein Hod (Ein Haud) 1945 1:250,000

=== Ein Hawd: new village after 1948 ===
Most of the 700–900 Arab villagers of Ein Hod from before the 1948 Arab–Israeli War resettled in the West Bank, many in the refugee camp in Jenin. A group of 35 original inhabitants, many of them members of the Abu al-Hija family, took shelter in a nearby wadi. Attempts to dispossess them by legal means did not succeed. This new village was named Ein Hawd. Initially, the Israeli authorities did not recognize the village. In 1988, residents helped to form the association of the Arab Unrecognized Villages in Israel. In 1992, the state finally officially recognized the village, but it was only granted full recognition in 2005, when it was connected to Israel's electric grid.

=== Moshav Ein Hod ===
In July 1949 the Moshavim Movement settled immigrants from Tunisia and Algeria in the depopulated village, renaming the village Ein Hod. The movement allocated instructors to the new settlers as the agricultural endeavour. The short lived re-use of the village as an agricultural concern was abandoned and the village remained deserted for a further year and a half.

=== Artists' colony ===
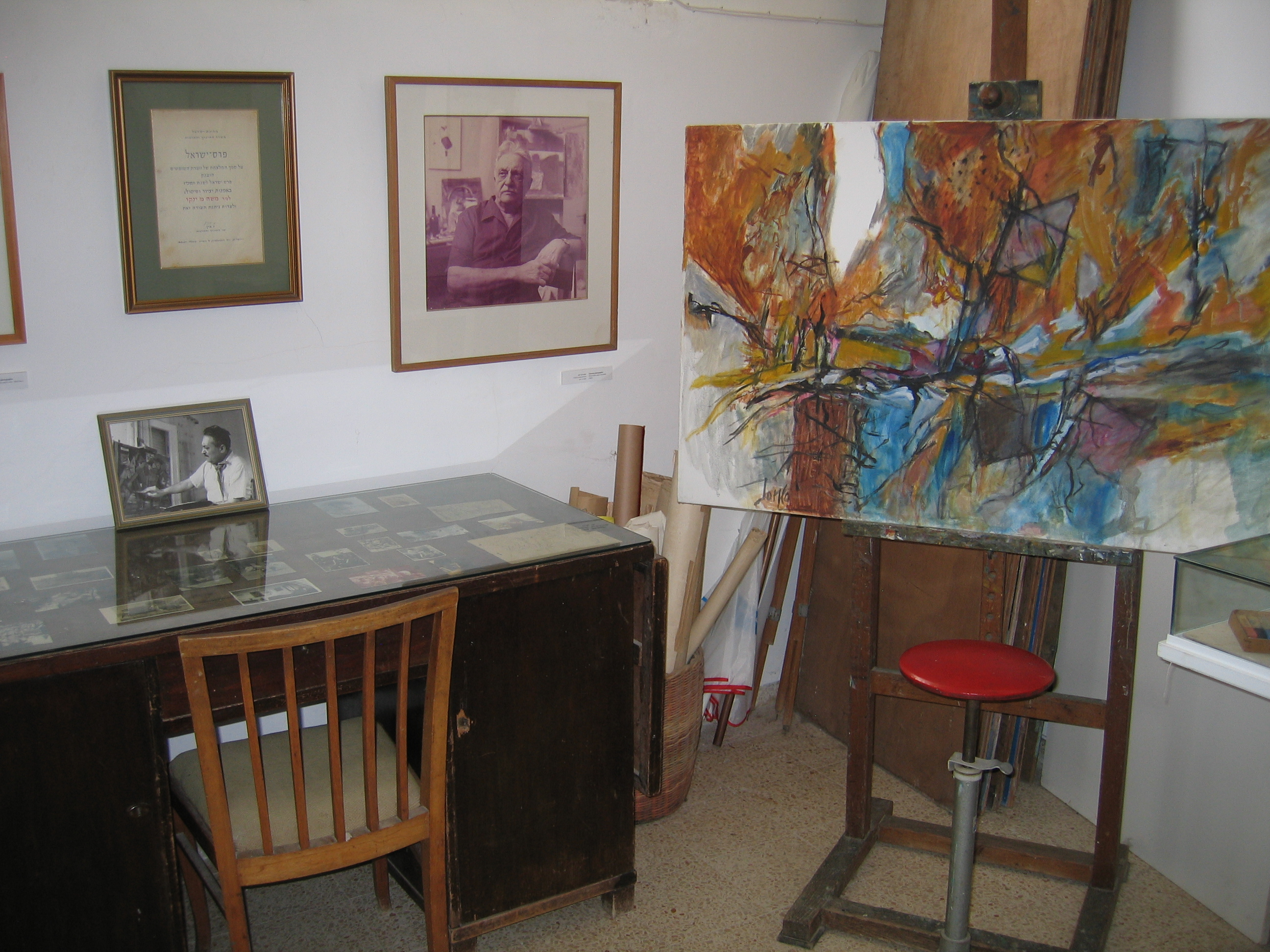
Marcel Janco studio at Ein Hod artist village

Ein Hod became an artists' colony in 1953. The driving spirit behind the project was Marcel Janco, an acclaimed Dada artist, who kept the village from being demolished by the security forces and convinced the government to let him build an artists' colony there.

=== Today ===
Ein Hod is now a community settlement run by an elected administrative committee. Many Israeli painters, sculptors and musicians live there, and maintain studios and galleries that are open to the public. Efforts have been made to preserve some of the old houses. The village mosque was converted into a restaurant-bar modeled after Cafe Voltaire in Zurich.

During the 2010 Mount Carmel forest fire Ein Hod was evacuated and the village suffered considerable property damage.

== Culture ==
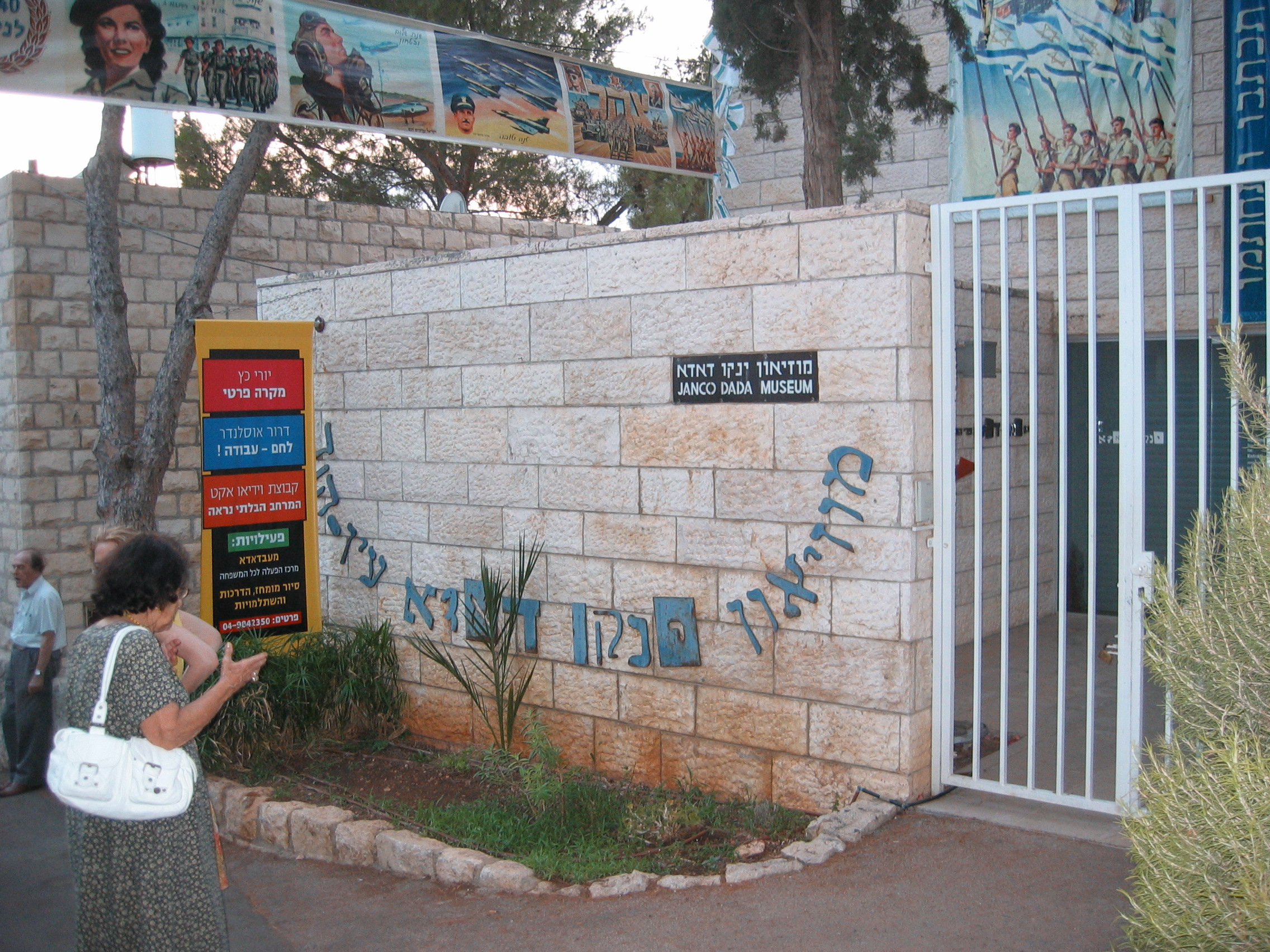
The Janco-Dada Museum

Ein Hod has 22 galleries, 14 art workshops, 2 museums and 14 rooms for rent to tourists. Workshops include printing, sculpture, photography, silk screening, music (vocal), ceramics, mosaics, design, stained glass, lithography and blacksmithing. The Gertrud Kraus House sponsors biweekly chamber music concerts and guest lectures. During the summer months, performances of popular music and light entertainment take place in an outdoor amphitheatre. Throughout the year, free outdoor jazz concerts are held on Saturdays near the village's central square.

Ein Hod's main gallery has five exhibition halls, each devoted to a different artistic sector. Hall 1 exhibits art by immigrants from the former Soviet Union and Ethiopia; Hall 2 is exclusively for Ein Hod artists, past and present; Halls 3 and 4 are for changing exhibitions, solo and group shows of residents and outsiders; and Hall 5 is for theme shows.

The Nisco Museum of Mechanical Music in Ein Hod is the first museum in Israel dedicated to antique musical instruments. The collection, accumulated over 40 years by Nisan Cohen, contains music boxes, hurdy-gurdies, an automatic organ, a reproducing player piano, a collection of 100-year-old manivelles, gramophones, hand-operated automatic pianos and other instruments.

In 1992 an original part from the Berlin Wall was placed in the village, and it has since been welcoming the visitors to the main museum.

The Düsseldorf-Ein Hod exchange program has brought Düsseldorf artists to Ein Hod and vice versa over the past two decades. A similar program has been inaugurated for artists from New Hampshire.

== Notable residents ==
An early resident was the American children's writer and amateur archaeologist Nora Benjamin Kubie. One of Ein Hod's veteran artists is Ursula Malbin, whose bronze sculptures have been on display since 1978 in Haifa's Vista of Peace Garden, the first public sculpture garden in Israel dedicated solely to the works of a woman sculptor. Others include Avraham Eilat, a multimedia artist whose latest video art installation "Psychophysical Time" is shown in several leading art events in Europe, and Dina Merhav creates sculptures from old metal utensils and industrial machine parts. One of her works, Totem, was exhibited at the Olympic Sculpture Garden in Beijing, China, when the Olympic Games were held there. Yigal Tumarkin, Israeli painter and sculptor, also studied at Ein Hod.

Dan Chamizer, creator of the "Chamizer riddle," is a resident of Ein Hod. Based on an original coding system, the Chamizer riddle is widely used to teach problem-solving in schools, government agencies and high-tech companies.

Ten Ein Hod residents have won the Israel Prize, awarded annually on Israel Independence Day. According to Robert Nechin, who lives in the village, the artists working there today "are fully aware of the illustrious example of these great artists and scholars, who lived and are still living among them. Ein Hod residents who have won the prize are:

- Genia Berger, in 1953 became one of the founders of the artists' colony
- Zahara Schatz, for painting and sculpture (1955)
- Marcel Janco, for painting (1967)
- Gertrud Kraus, for dance (1968)
- Simon Halkin, for literature (1975)
- Haim Hefer, for Hebrew songwriting (1983)
- Natan Zach, for poetry (1995)
- Michael Gross, for painting and sculpture (2000)
- Gila Almagor, for acting (2004)

== Gallery ==
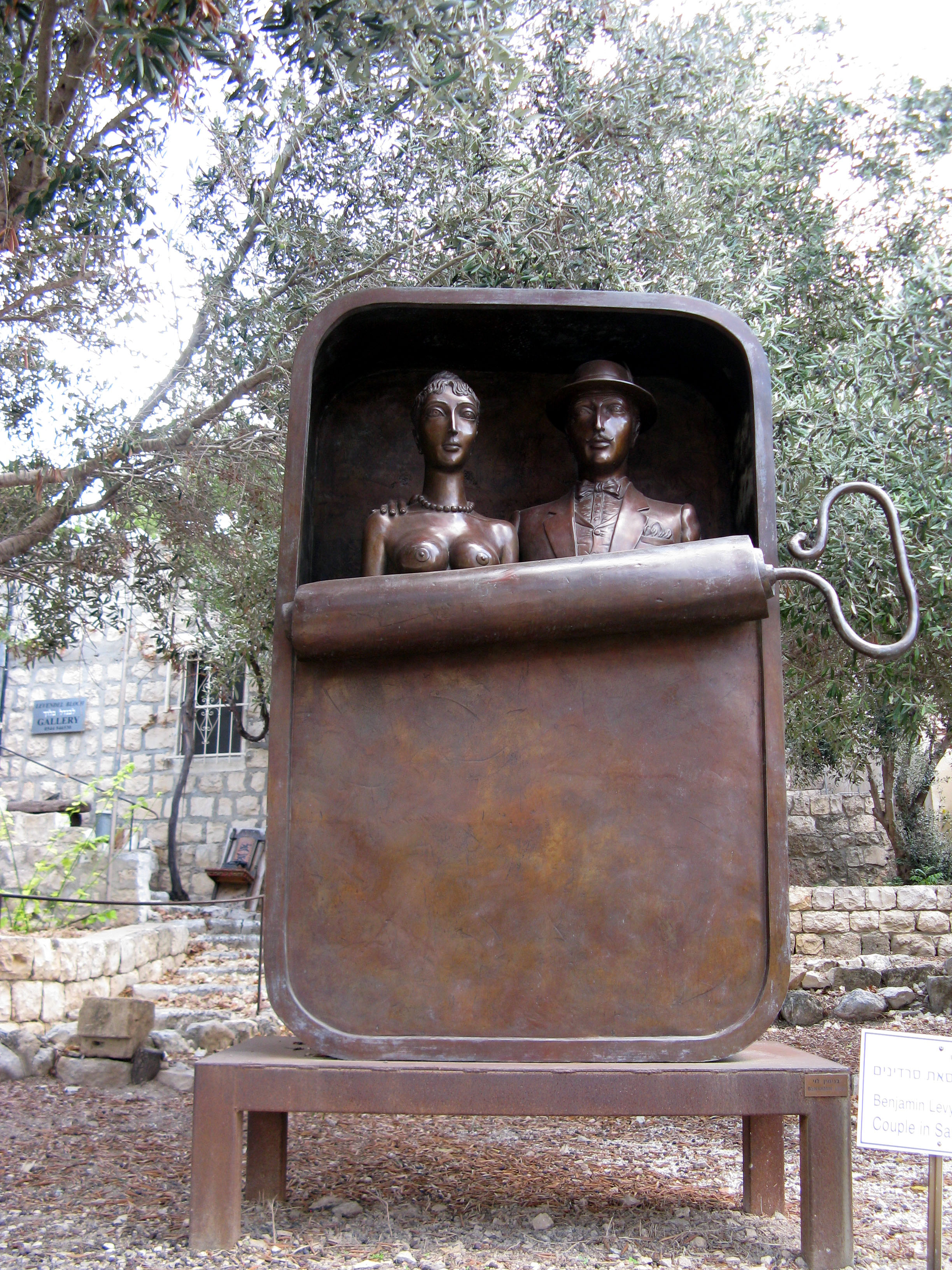
Benjamin Levy. Lovers in the box of sardines.

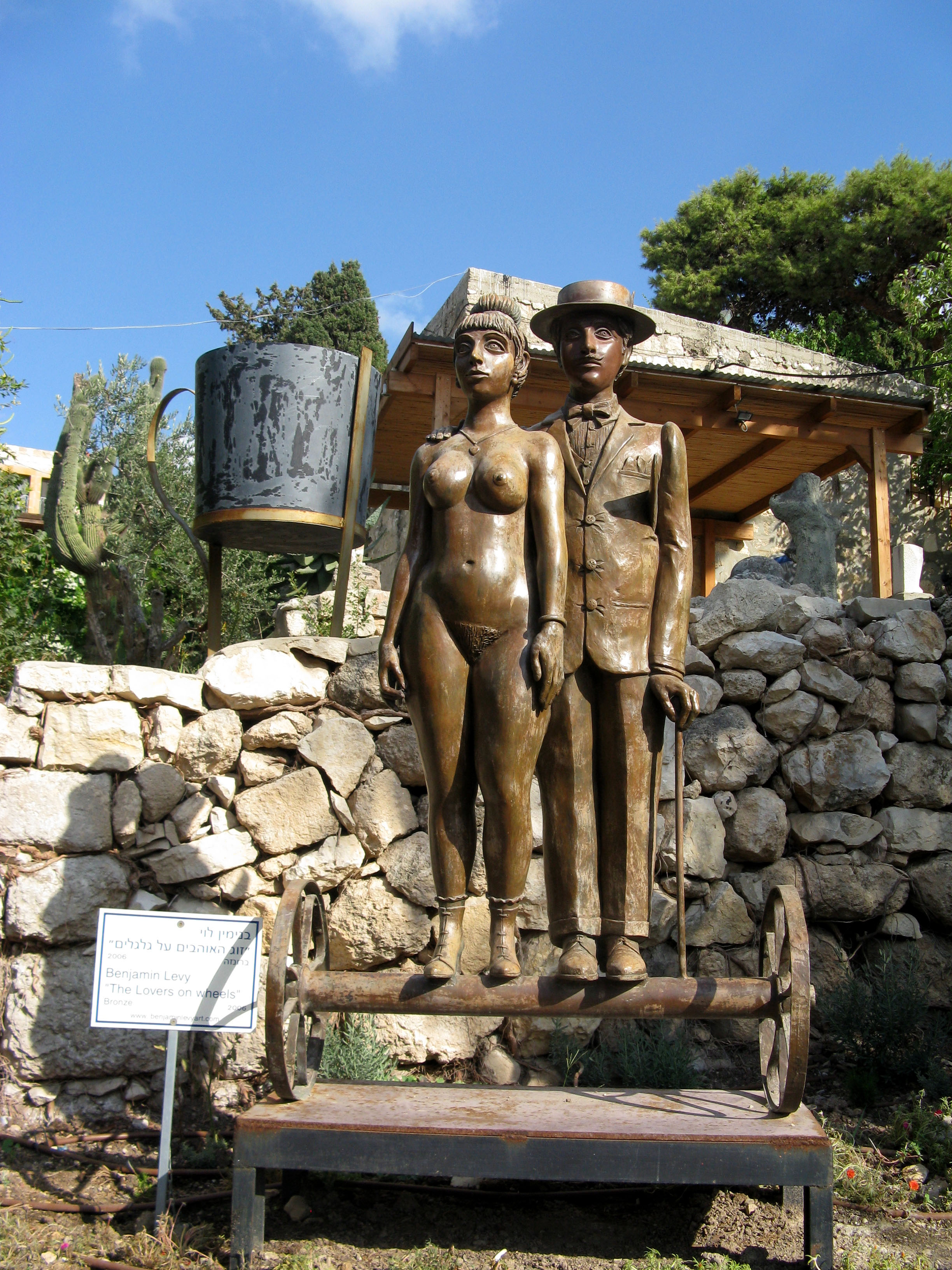
Benjamin Levy. Lovers on the axle of wheels.

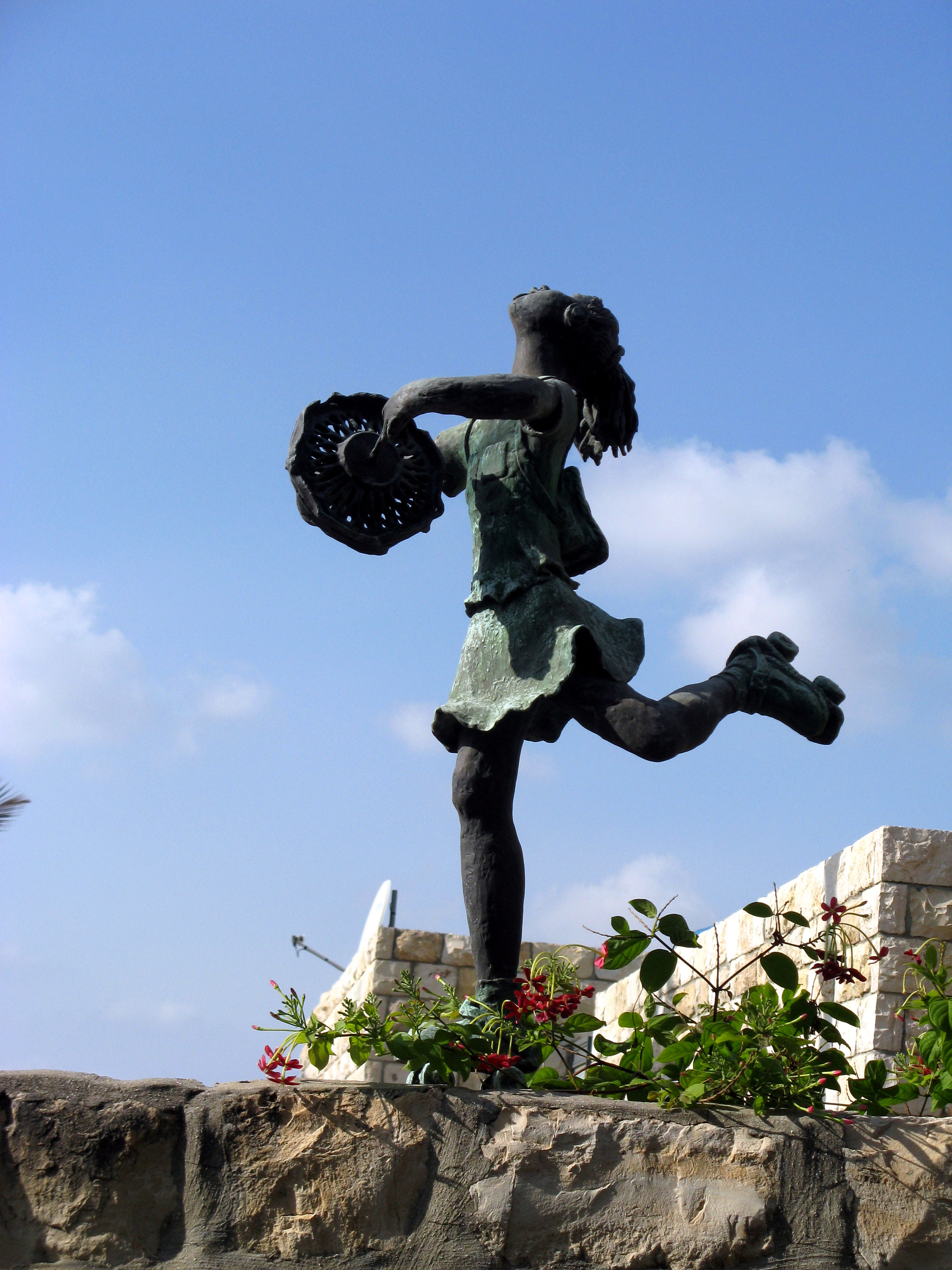
Girl on Roller Skates.

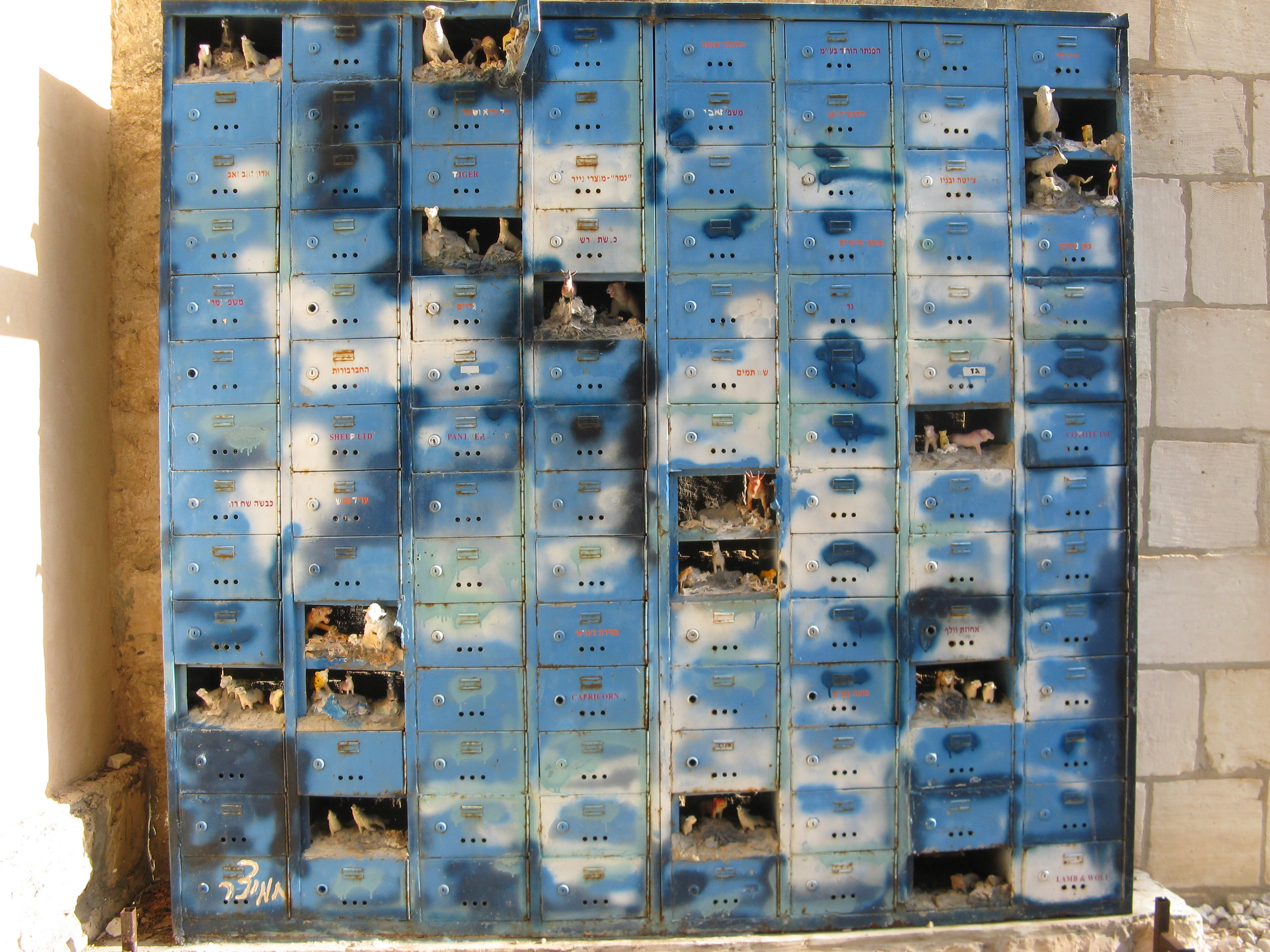
POB world.

== See also ==
- Visual arts in Israel
- Depopulated Palestinian locations in Israel
- List of villages depopulated during the Arab-Israeli conflict
- 500 Dunam on the Moon, 2002 documentary film about the fate of the 1948 Arab village
- The Promise (2011 TV serial), fictional account about the owner of a house in Ein Hod

== Bibliography ==
- Barron, J.B., ed. (1923). Palestine: Report and General Abstracts of the Census of 1922. Government of Palestine.
- Benveniśtî, M. (2000). Sacred landscape: the buried history of the Holy Land since 1948 (Illustrated ed.). University of California Press. ISBN 0-520-21154-5.
- Conder, C.R.; Kitchener, H.H. (1881). The Survey of Western Palestine: Memoirs of the Topography, Orography, Hydrography, and Archaeology. Vol. 1. London: Committee of the Palestine Exploration Fund.
- Government of Palestine, Department of Statistics (1945). Village Statistics, April, 1945.
- Guérin, V. (1875). Description Géographique Historique et Archéologique de la Palestine (in French). Vol. 2: Samarie, pt. 2. Paris: L'Imprimerie Nationale.
- Hadawi, S. (1970). Village Statistics of 1945: A Classification of Land and Area ownership in Palestine. Palestine Liberation Organization Research Center.
- Hütteroth, W.-D.; Abdulfattah, K. (1977). Historical Geography of Palestine, Transjordan and Southern Syria in the Late 16th Century. Erlanger Geographische Arbeiten, Sonderband 5. Erlangen, Germany: Vorstand der Fränkischen Geographischen Gesellschaft. ISBN 3-920405-41-2.
- Khalidi, W. (1992). All That Remains: The Palestinian Villages Occupied and Depopulated by Israel in 1948. Washington D.C.: Institute for Palestine Studies. ISBN 0-88728-224-5.
- Mills, E., ed. (1932). Census of Palestine 1931. Population of Villages, Towns and Administrative Areas. Jerusalem: Government of Palestine.
- Morris, B. (2004). The Birth of the Palestinian Refugee Problem Revisited. Cambridge University Press. ISBN 978-0-521-00967-6.
- Mülinen, Egbert Friedrich von 1908, Beiträge zur Kenntnis des Karmels "Separateabdruck aus der Zeitschrift des Deutschen Palëstina-Vereins Band XXX (1907) Seite 117–207 und Band XXXI (1908) Seite 1–258."
- Palmer, E.H. (1881). The Survey of Western Palestine: Arabic and English Name Lists Collected During the Survey by Lieutenants Conder and Kitchener, R. E. Transliterated and Explained by E.H. Palmer. Committee of the Palestine Exploration Fund.
- Schumacher, G. (1888). "Population list of the Liwa of Akka". Quarterly Statement – Palestine Exploration Fund. 20: 169–191.
- Slyomovics, Susan (1998). The object of memory: Arab and Jew narrate the Palestinian village (Illustrated ed.). University of Pennsylvania Press. ISBN 978-0-8122-1525-0. (winner of the 1999 Albert Hourani Book Award) (p. 100)
- Velde, van de, C.W.M. (1854). Narrative of a journey through Syria and Palestine in 1851 and 1852. Vol. 1. William Blackwood and son.
