= Sirin, Baysan =

Sirin سرين Sereen
- Etymology: folds (a village)
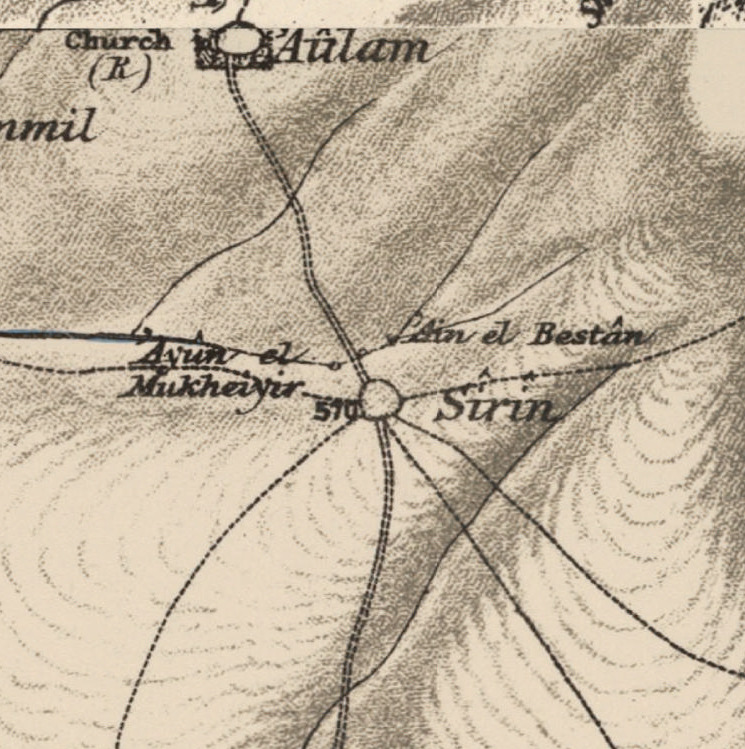
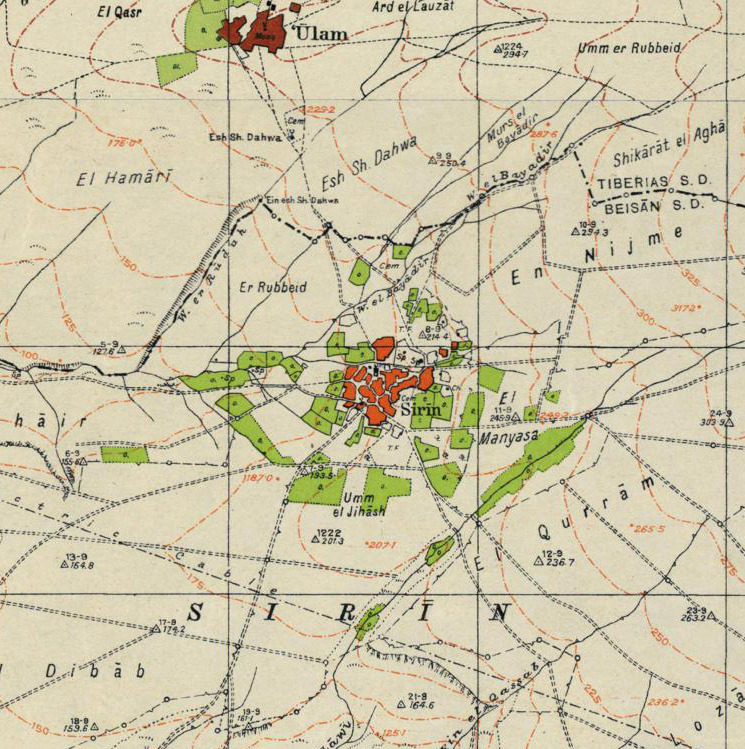
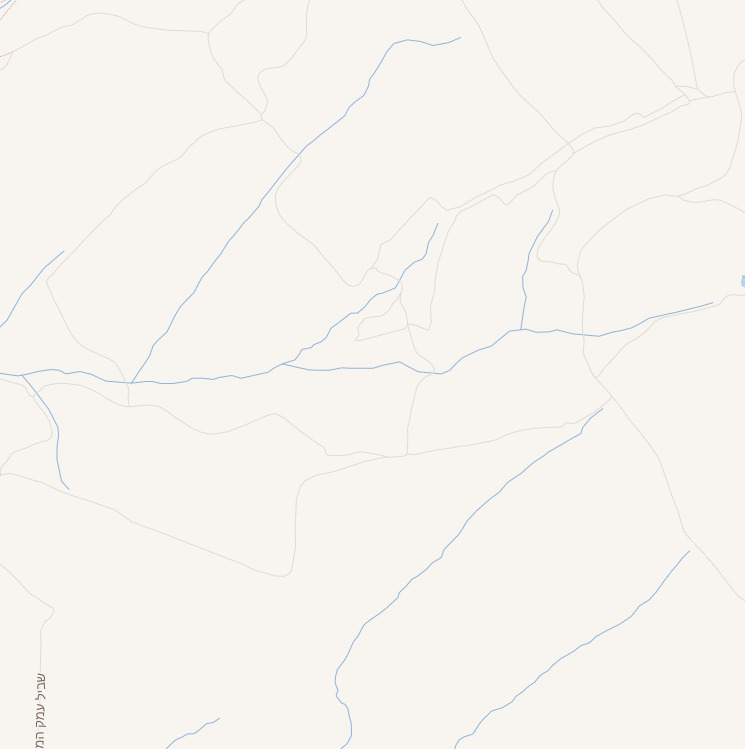
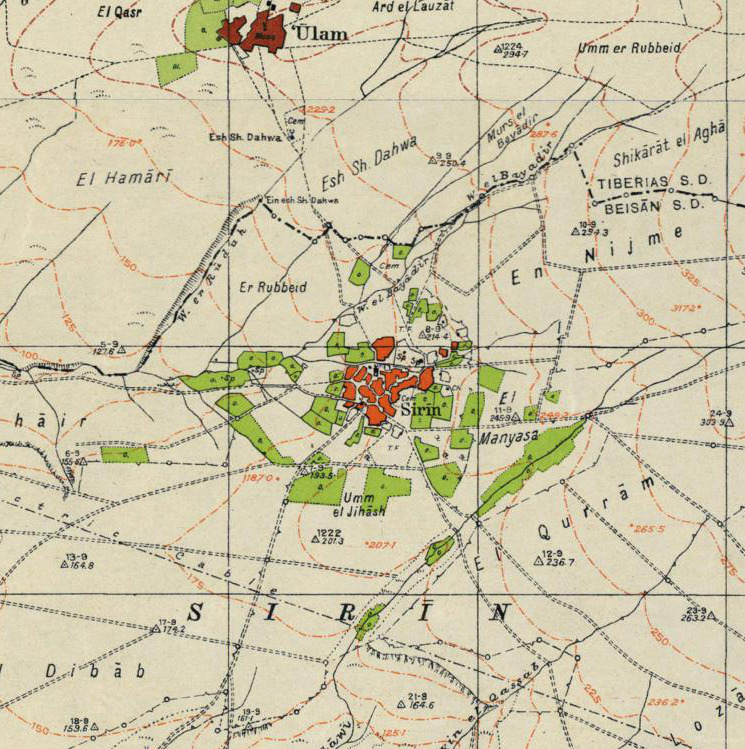
- 1870s map 1940s map modern map 1940s with modern overlay map A series of historical maps of the area around Sirin, Baysan (click the buttons)

- Location within Mandatory Palestine
- Coordinates: 32°39′48″N 35°30′33″E
- Palestine grid: 197/228
- Geopolitical entity: Mandatory Palestine
- Subdistrict: Baysan
- Date of depopulation: April 6, 1948

Area
  - Total: 28,445 dunams (28.445 km^{2}; 10.983 sq mi)

Population (1945)
  - Total: 810

Sirin (Arabic: سرين), was a Palestinian Arab village located 17 kilometers (11 mi) north of Beisan. The village was depopulated and destroyed in 1948. Only the village cemetery and one house remain standing, along with the remains of a mosaic pavement and a vaulted spring dating to the Byzantine period. Mentioned in historical documents, the 1596 census indicated it had 45 households; by 1945, the number of inhabitants had risen to 810.

== History ==
=== Roman and Byzantine periods ===
The village dated back to the Roman period.

Near a spring were two fallen blocks, apparently lintels, which had the appearance of dating back to the Byzantine period. Several other remains from the Byzantine era were also found in the village, including a Greek inscription and parts of a mosaic pavement.

Conder suggested that it was identical with the Sirin, a place inhabited by Samaritans in the 7th century.

=== Crusader period ===
In 1168, during the Crusader period, the village was known as Losserin. That year it was sold by a certain Simon Chevron to the Hospitalliers.

In 1994, Andrew Petersen visited Sirin, and inspected a rectangular (10 x 12 meters) tower structure. It had two entrances, one to the north and one to the south, where the south side was the original, older part. The masonry and arches indicate that the original structure dates to the Crusader era, while the later northern entrance dated to an Ottoman reconstruction.

=== Ottoman period ===
Like other villages in Palestine, Sirin fell under the rule of the Ottoman Empire between 1517 and 1918.

During the 16th and 17th centuries, Sitin al-Turab, as the village was called, belonged to the Turabay Emirate (1517-1683), which encompassed also the Jezreel Valley, Haifa, Jenin, Beit She'an Valley, northern Jabal Nablus, Bilad al-Ruha/Ramot Menashe, and the northern part of the Sharon plain.

In the 1596 tax records, Sirin formed part of the nahiya (subdistrict) of Jenin under the liwa' ("district") of Lajjun, with a population of 45 Muslim household. Villagers paid a fixed tax rate of 25% on a number of crops, including wheat and barley, as well as on goats and beehives; a total of 20,600 akçe.

A map by Pierre Jacotin from Napoleon's invasion of 1799 showed the place, named as Serin. James Silk Buckingham, who visited the village in 1816, transcribes its name as "Sereen" and describes it as being made up of about thirty to forty houses with half a dozen Bedouin tents located close to it. In 1838 Edward Robinson noted it as one of the villages at the brow of the Jordan valley, together with Awlam.

In 1859, the English consul estimated the population to be about 100 inhabitants, who cultivated 35 faddans of land In 1875 Victor Guérin found the village to have 400 inhabitants. He further noted an ancient tower, each side measuring 14 steps. The remains of two churches were seen, one of them had been transformed into a mosque. There was also a Wali nearby, called Neby Sirin. In 1882, the PEF's Survey of Western Palestine described the village of Sirin as being an adobe village of moderate size, surrounded by hedges of prickly pear.

=== British Mandate ===
In the 1922 census of Palestine, conducted by the authorities of Mandatory Palestine, Sirin had a population of 681; 621 Muslims and 60 Christians, where all the Christians were Roman Catholics. The population had decreased slightly by the 1931 census to 630; 562 Muslims and 68 Christians, in a total of 161 houses.

In the 1945 statistics, the population was 810; 620 Muslims and 190 Christians and the total land area was 28,445 dunums. Of the land, 413 dunums were used for plantations and irrigable land, 15,813 for cereals, while a total of 131 dunums were classified as built-up land.

=== 1948, aftermath ===
==== 1948 war ====
First evacuated in April 1948 by Jewish forces, by June 1948, some of the inhabitants had returned. Permanently depopulated by Israeli troops in the summer of 1948, Sirin was then completely destroyed.

Benny Morris writes that Sirin was one of the first of approximately two dozen villages that were evacuated on Arab orders in April–May 1948 for "pre-invasion military reasons." However Ilan Pappe writes that the village had not been evacuated and that it expected that it "would be exempt from the fate of the nearby villages", due to its good connections with Jewish authorities, but that it was nonetheless occupied by Jewish troops on May 12, 1948, expelling the population and destroying the mosque, church and monastery.

When Israeli troops entered Sirin in June 1948, they that about 100 inhabitants had returned. After checking their IDs and searching for weapons (finding only some knives), the troops left the village. A report from the battalion's intelligence officer recommended, "the Arabs should be ejected from the area, the young men should be arrested, and the crops confiscated ..." Sirin, along with the villages of Hadatha, 'Ulam, and Ma'dhar, were all ethnically cleansed by Israeli troops in the summer of 1948.

==== Remains (1990s) ====
Walid Khalidi described all that was left of the village structures of Sirin in 1992: "The cemetery and one house (which serves as a storage room for straw) are all that remain of Sirin. Stone rubble surrounded by clusters of cactuses can be seen on the site. The site itself is used as a stockyard for cattle. The spring in the middle of the site is covered with a stone structure. Some of the land around the village is planted in cotton."

In 1994, Andrew Petersen visited Sirin and inspected the ruins of a Crusader tower.

== See also ==
- Ein Hod

== Bibliography ==
- Barron, J.B., ed. (1923). Palestine: Report and General Abstracts of the Census of 1922. Government of Palestine.
- Buckingham, J.S. (1821). Travels in Palestine through the countries of Bashan and Gilead, east of the River Jordan, including a visit to the cities of Geraza and Gamala in the Decapolis. London: Longman, Hurst, Rees, Orme and Brown.
- Conder, C.R. (1876). "Samaritan Topography". Quarterly Statement - Palestine Exploration Fund. 22: 182–197.
- Conder, C.R.; Kitchener, H.H. (1882). The Survey of Western Palestine: Memoirs of the Topography, Orography, Hydrography, and Archaeology. Vol. 2. London: Committee of the Palestine Exploration Fund.
- Government of Palestine, Department of Statistics (1945). Village Statistics, April, 1945.
- Guérin, V. (1880). Description Géographique Historique et Archéologique de la Palestine (in French). Vol. 3: Galilee, pt. 1. Paris: L'Imprimerie Nationale.
- Hadawi, S. (1970). Village Statistics of 1945: A Classification of Land and Area ownership in Palestine. Palestine Liberation Organization Research Center.
- Hütteroth, W.-D.; Abdulfattah, K. (1977). Historical Geography of Palestine, Transjordan and Southern Syria in the Late 16th Century. Erlanger Geographische Arbeiten, Sonderband 5. Erlangen, Germany: Vorstand der Fränkischen Geographischen Gesellschaft. ISBN 3-920405-41-2.
- Karmon, Y. (1960). "An Analysis of Jacotin's Map of Palestine" (PDF). Israel Exploration Journal. 10 (3, 4): 155–173, 244–253. Archived from the original (PDF) on 2019-12-22.
- Khalidi, W. (1992). All That Remains: The Palestinian Villages Occupied and Depopulated by Israel in 1948. Washington D.C.: Institute for Palestine Studies. ISBN 0-88728-224-5.
- Mills, E., ed. (1932). Census of Palestine 1931. Population of Villages, Towns and Administrative Areas. Jerusalem: Government of Palestine.
- Morris, B. (2004). The Birth of the Palestinian Refugee Problem Revisited. Cambridge University Press. ISBN 978-0-521-00967-6.
- Palmer, E.H. (1881). The Survey of Western Palestine: Arabic and English Name Lists Collected During the Survey by Lieutenants Conder and Kitchener, R. E. Transliterated and Explained by E.H. Palmer. Committee of the Palestine Exploration Fund.
- Pappé, I. (2007). The ethnic cleansing of Palestine. (reprint). Oneworld Publications Limited. ISBN 978-1-78074-056-0.
- Petersen, Andrew (2001). A Gazetteer of Buildings in Muslim Palestine (British Academy Monographs in Archaeology). Vol. 1. Oxford University Press. ISBN 978-0-19-727011-0.
- Pringle, D. (1997). Secular buildings in the Crusader Kingdom of Jerusalem: an archaeological Gazetter. Cambridge University Press. ISBN 0-521-46010-7.
- Robinson, E.; Smith, E. (1841). Biblical Researches in Palestine, Mount Sinai and Arabia Petraea: A Journal of Travels in the year 1838. Vol. 3. Boston: Crocker & Brewster.
- Röhricht, R. (1893). (RRH) Regesta regni Hierosolymitani (MXCVII-MCCXCI) (in Latin). Berlin: Libraria Academica Wageriana.
- Tsafrir, Y.; Leah Di Segni; Judith Green (1994). (TIR): Tabula Imperii Romani: Judaea, Palaestina. Jerusalem: Israel Academy of Sciences and Humanities. ISBN 965-208-107-8.
