= Dan Chamizer =

Broadcast personality

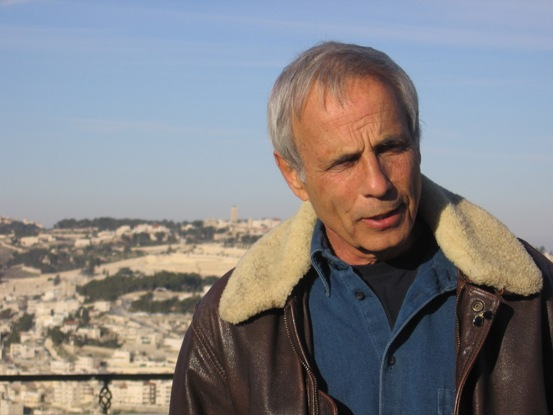
Dan Chamizer, 2007

Dan Chamizer (Hebrew: דן חמיצר; born 21 January 1947) is an Israeli artist, radio and television host, journalist and quiz master.

== Biography ==
Dan Chamizer was born in Jerusalem, Mandatory Palestine. He grew up in Ramat Gan. His father, Emmanuel Chamizer, was killed during the 1947–1949 Palestine war in battle for Nitzanim. His grandfather was the physician and sculptor Raphael Chamizer. Chamizer holds an MA in Social Sciences from Tel Aviv University (1978). His MA thesis dealt with the impact of environmental and human factors on pilot error.

Chamizer lives in Ein Hod, an artists village at the foot of the Carmel mountains in northern Israel. His son Giora is an Israeli television producer.

== Aviation career ==
During his military service, Chamizer was a helicopter pilot. After discharge from the Israel Defense Forces, he became a commercial pilot with Arkia Airlines and a pioneer in Israel's fledgling micro-aviation industry.

== Media career ==
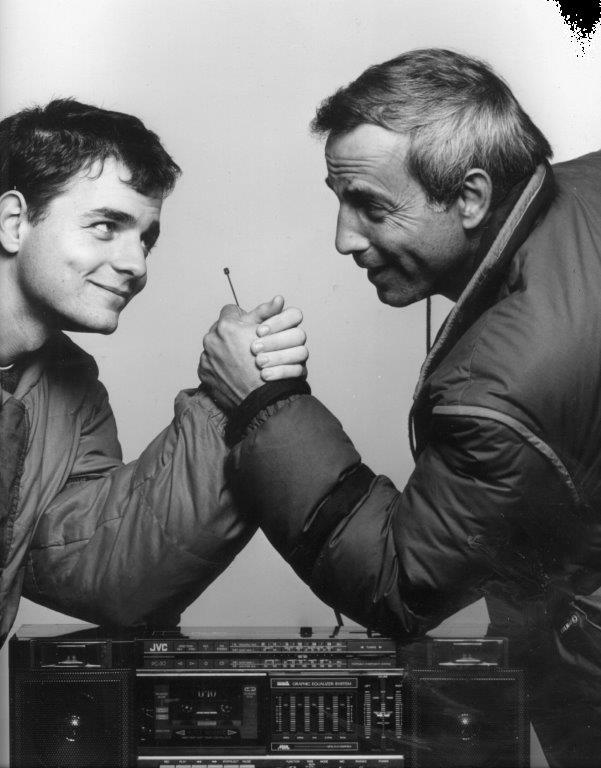
Dan Chamizer and son Giora

Chamizer was a newspaper columnist, radio presenter for Galei Tsahal and a TV host. With Zeev Aner, he produced hundreds of nationwide treasure hunt games. He had a daily spot on Razi Barkai and Shelly Yachimovich's radio show, "Hakol Diburim" (1990–1997). The show was broadcast on the Reshet Bet radio channel, where Chamizer presented a featured item called "Chidat Chamizer" (Chamizer's riddle). His riddles were based on imagination and associative thinking rather than general knowledge. The riddles proved challenging to solve and required ‘entering the mind’ of Chamizer to identify and decoding his personal associations.

The prize for solving the riddles increased every day and often amounted to substantial sums of money, thus attracting a large audience. In its seven years on air, the percentage share of listeners increased to 17%, making him one of the most innovative contributors in radio. Chamizer went on to produce TV game shows, including "Otzar Hanegev", "Yemei Eden BaGalil", "Yovel La’Medina", "Treasures of One Hundred Years of Zionism", "Treasures of World Cup Football", "Treasures of Israel at 60".

He returned to radio in 2004 with a new game show called The "Chamizer Sentence", which offered the highest individual prize awarded in the history of Israeli radio game shows- NIS 240,000. In 2009, Chamizer produced the VOD Treasure for HOT TV, and in 2010, he produced The Treasure of the Century, celebrating 100 years of the Kibbutz Movement in Israel, followed by the New Israel Defense Force Quiz in 2011.

== Local culture ==
For decades Chamizer inspired Israelis to connect en-masse with opportunities for informal study via riddles, puzzles, games, nationwide treasure hunts and innovative educational projects. His surname – Chamizer – has become synonymous among Israelis with any riddle or intellectual challenge that requires wit, imagination and creativity to solve, and it has entered Hebrew slang as a verb, often conjugated playfully to describe the solving of sophisticated riddles.

== Educational projects ==
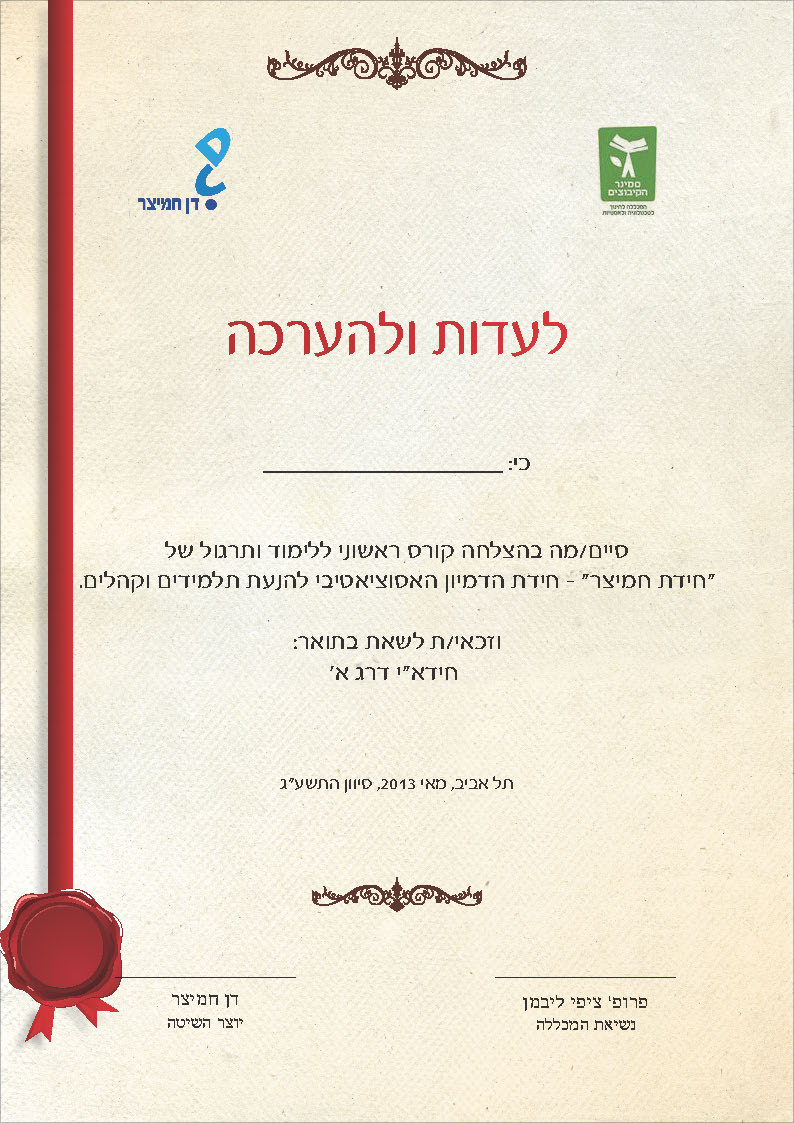
Diploma for completion of Chamizer riddle course

Chamizer developed the "Teaching through Riddles" educational method, where imaginative-associative riddles characterized by playful wit, wild leaps of imagination and outlandish word association became part of the approved national teaching curriculum in Israeli schools. To date, over half a million students have taken an active part in projects based around Chamizer riddles.

Chamizer sees his riddles as tools for encouraging inventive thinking. He explains the purpose of the method as follows: "The imaginative-associative riddle, like many of life’s problems, has endless solutions. Therefore, finding the correct approach to solving one, offers a perfect simulation for other life challenges that demand a creative input."

The method lends legitimacy to unconventional thinking and unmediated means, stimulating curiosity, creativity, enthusiasm and competitiveness. The cash prize goes to the player who "enter[s] the riddler’s head," but credit is also given for improvisation, initiative, creative thinking, teamwork, leadership, focus, openness, self-confidence and courage. In his words: "My aim is to instill an alternative way of acquiring study skills and assimilating knowledge."

In 2010, Chamizer established the National Riddle Archive, a dynamic online database of imaginative-associative riddles) in association with The Kibbutzim College of Education and the Teachers' Union in Israel. Designed to be used as a teaching resource, facilitating both formal and informal learning, the archive is aimed at professional educators and linked to study topics outlined in the national curriculum.

Examples of projects using the ‘Chamizer education method’:

- An online project that allows every participating teacher in Israel to select and receive relevant associative riddles with which to engage their pupils (launched 2015).
- An annual national initiative that motivates school pupils in Israel to recognize – in a playful, unmediated way – the importance of lifestyle in fostering a healthy heart (Hebrew and Arabic).
- A Haifa-based educational initiative, not only connecting pupils and parents to their own neighborhoods and communities, but also illuminating their shared past and introducing them to other educational establishments in their area (launched 2015, in Hebrew and Arabic)
- A two-year nationwide project intended to facilitate an understanding of the legacy of Israel's former leaders among Israeli schoolchildren (launched 2013)
- A national project aimed at promoting opportunities for greater exposure to the culture and heritage of Ethiopian Jewry among the wider school population in Israel.
- A project examining, defining, and promoting the legacy of the Israeli Labor Party, its philosophy and its leaders. (launched 2012, in association with Beit Berl Education College and the Knesset)
- An innovative makeover for the classic IDF (Israel Defense Force) quiz, designed to give every soldier the opportunity to demonstrate their knowledge of the force's core values, its national heritage and its position on environmental issues (launched 2010)
- Monopoly-like interactive game, created for the Ministry of Education, emphasizing the importance of the Hebrew language and its correct usage (launched 2009).
- An interactive game designed for the benefit of school children in Eilat, teaching them about the city's heritage and history (launched 2013-15)
- An interactive game designed to help Israeli high school pupils assimilate curriculum content in Sociology (launched 2013-15)
- Nationwide educational game, in association with the Israeli Ministry of Education, connecting Israeli children with immigration centers around the country, and facilitating a better understanding of the importance of successfully integrating immigrant children into society (launched 2016)

A long-standing environmental activist, Chamizer produced a series of games designed to promote environmental awareness, highlighting harm done to the countryside by Israeli citizens and the importance of confronting profit-seeking power brokers.

== Art career ==
Chamizer is a conceptual artist who creates environmental sculptures.

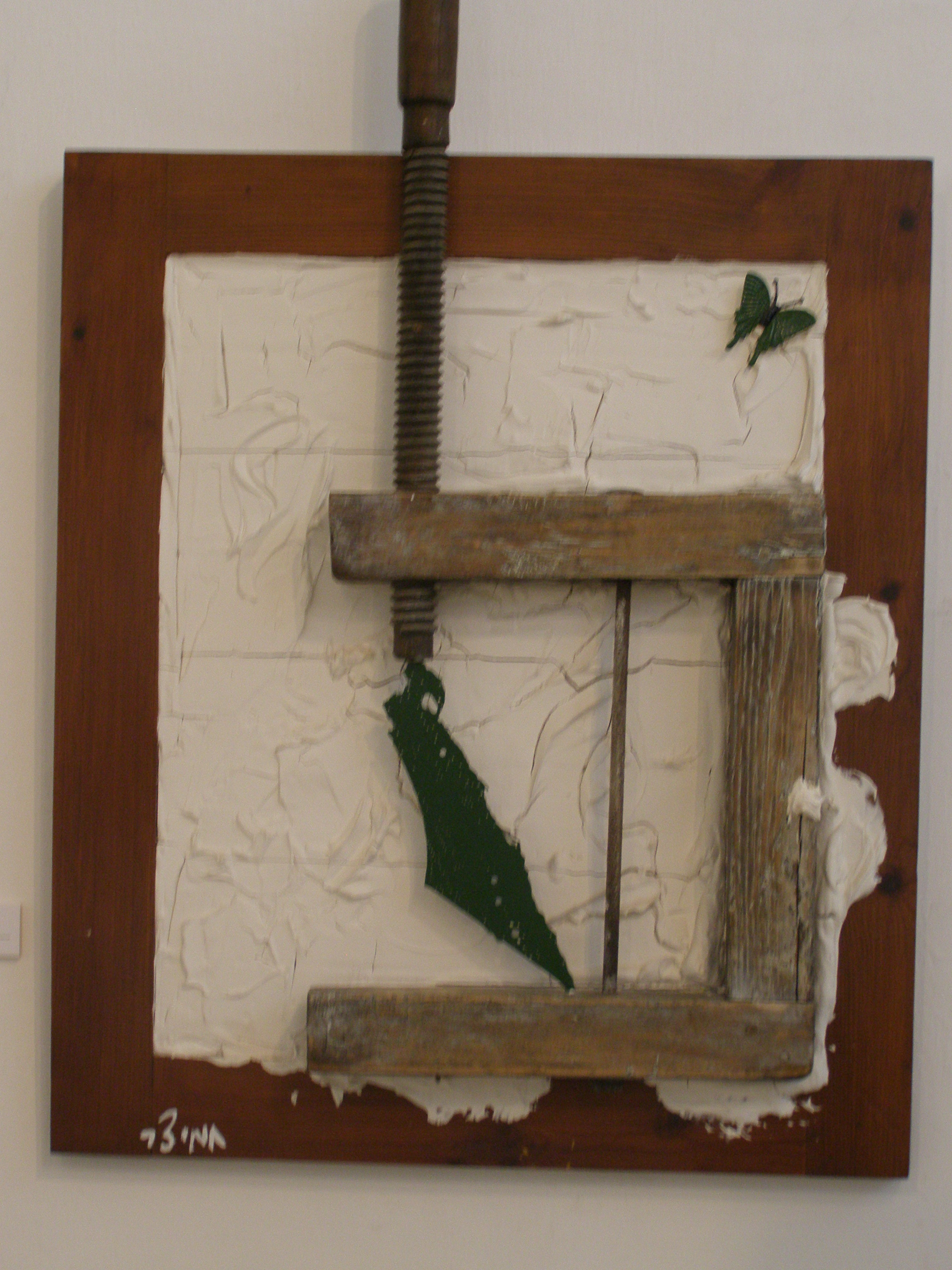
“I have no other country” – Artists’ Gallery, Ein Hod.

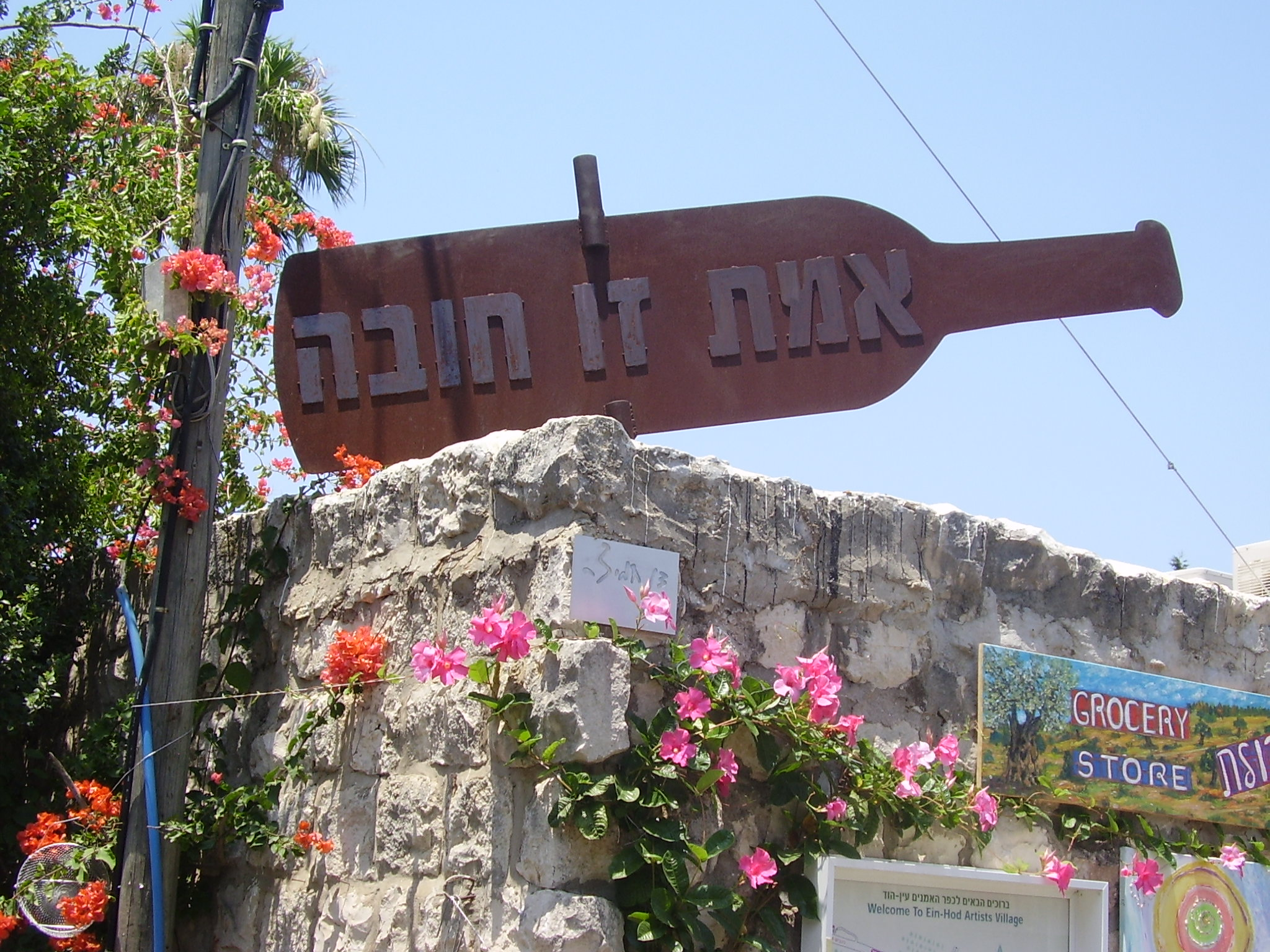
Truth or Nothing by Dan Chamizer in Ein Hod.

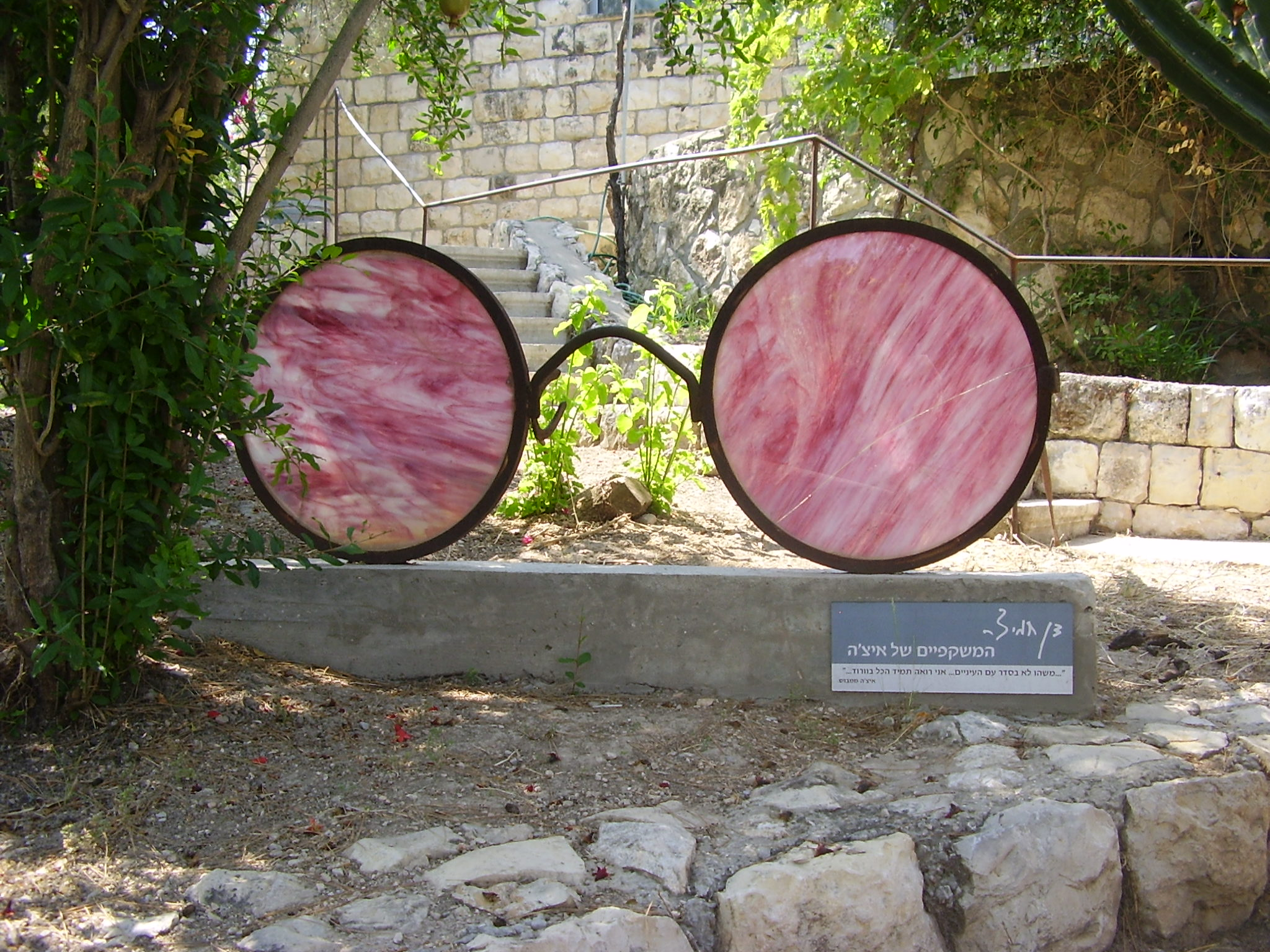
Happy Glasses of Itche Ein hod

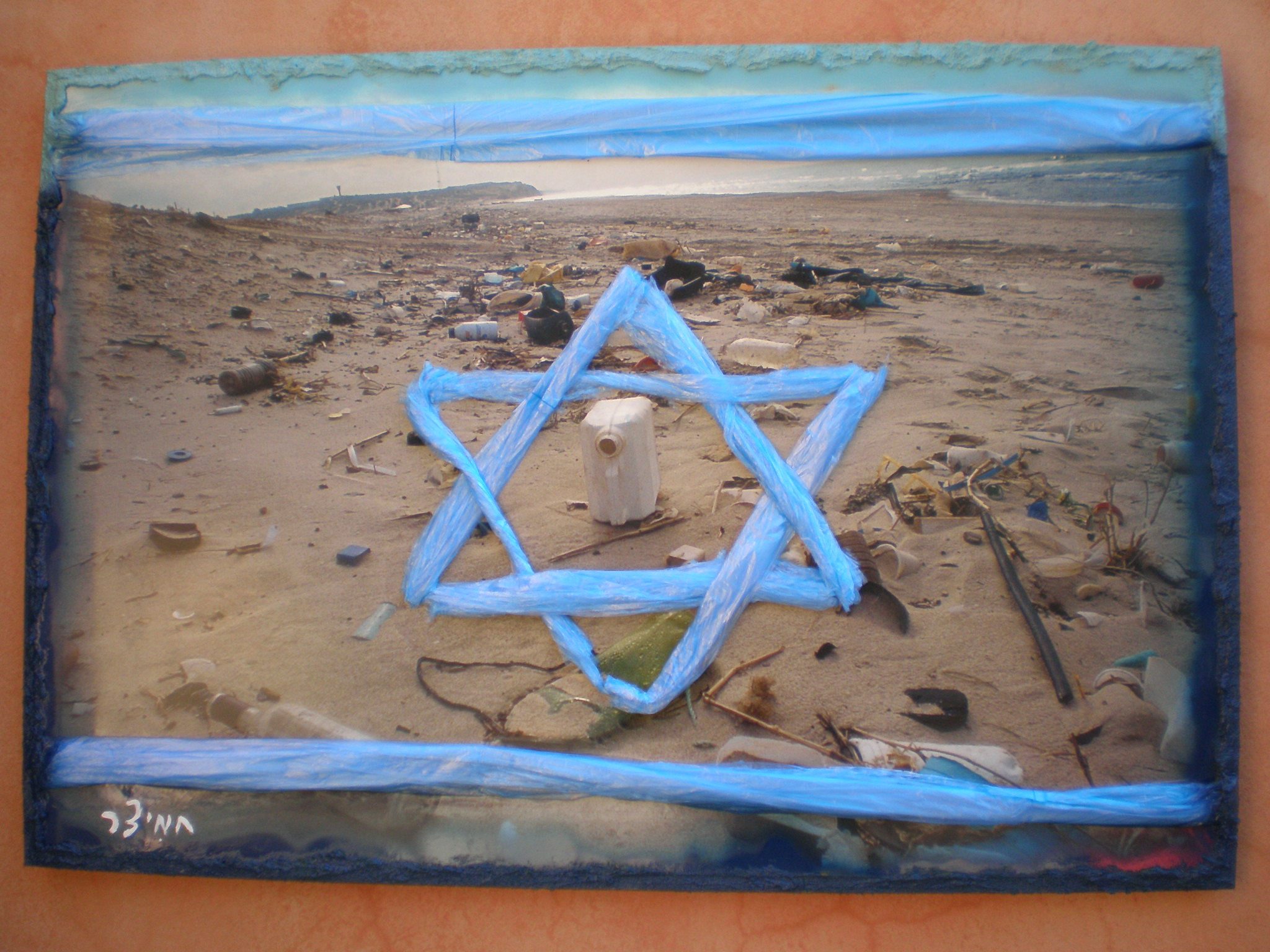
“Oh, my country” – Janco Dada Museum, Ein Hod.

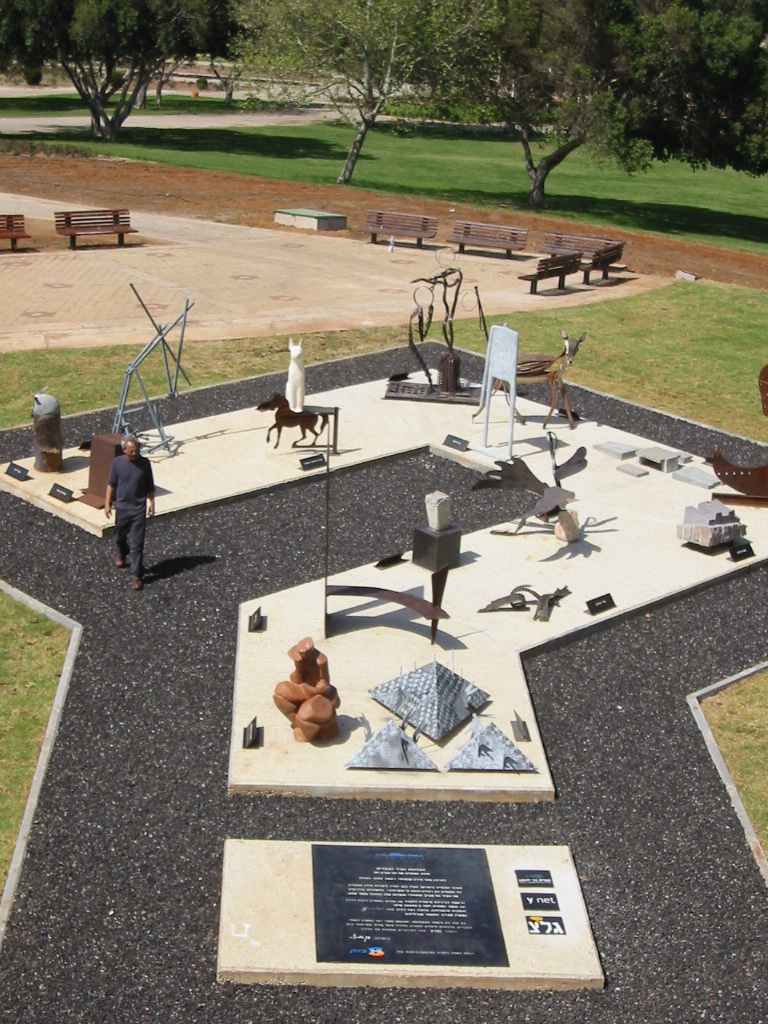
The riddle of Tel Aviv.

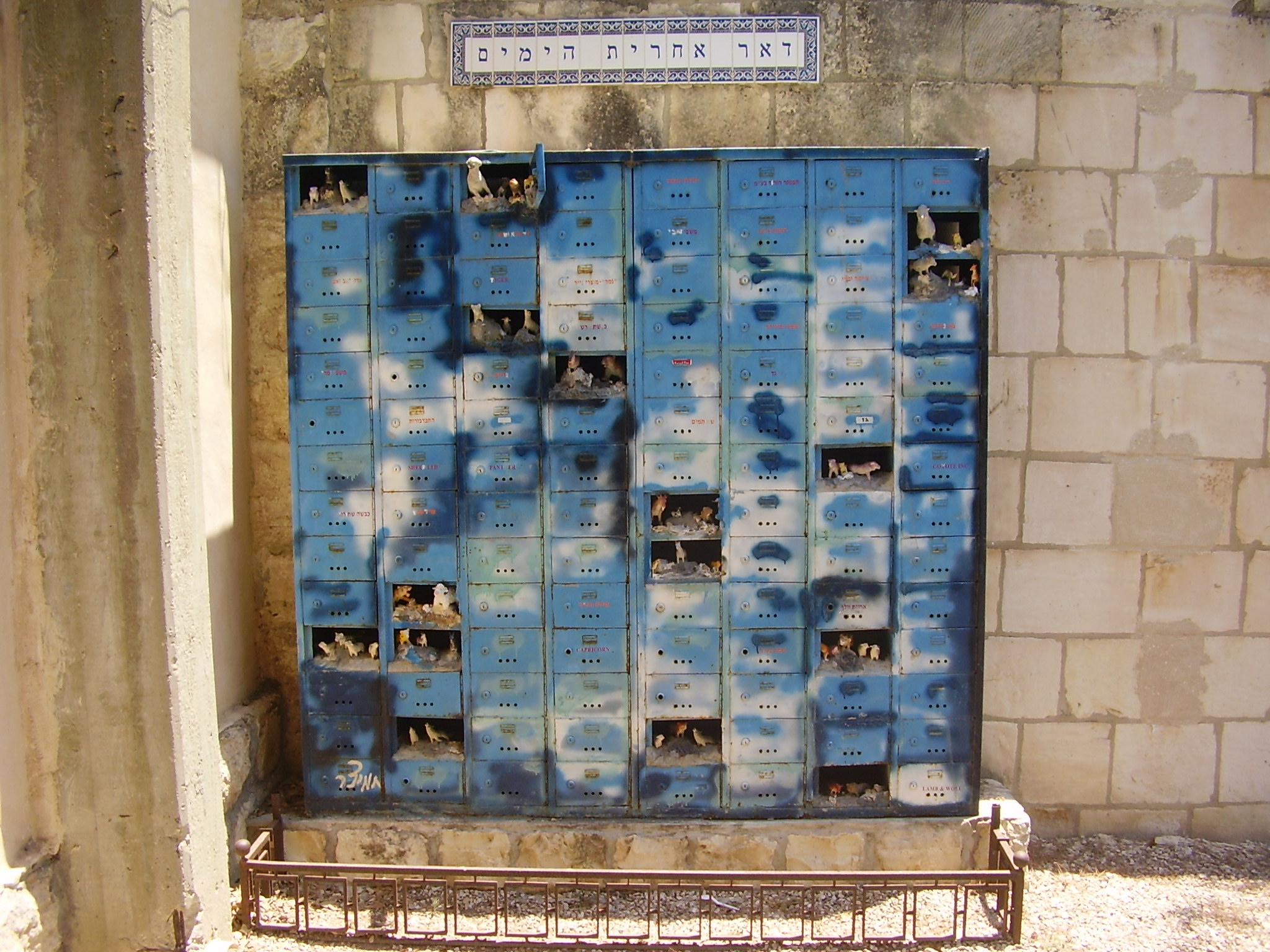
The end of days mail boxes" Ein Hod.

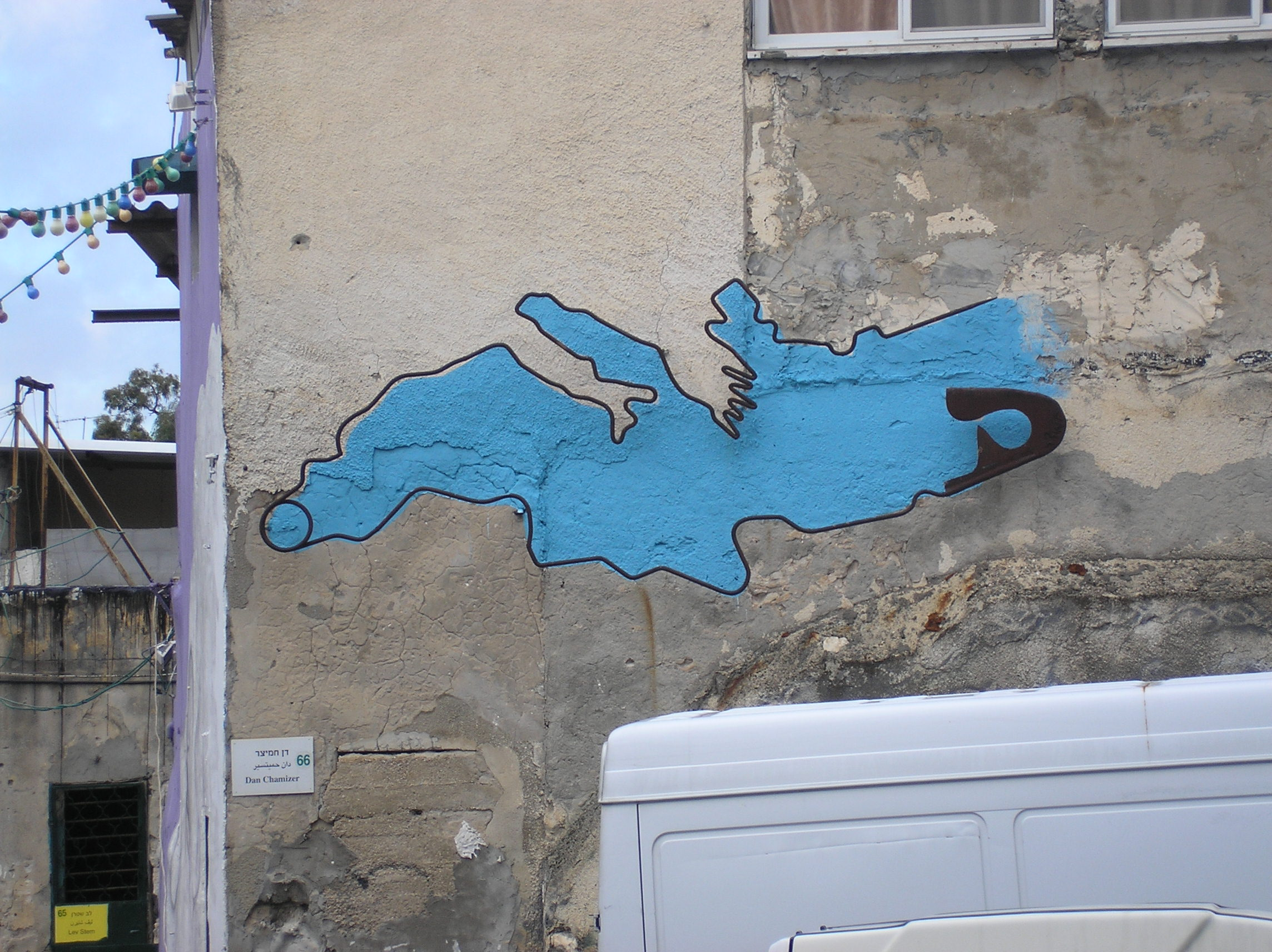
“The Mediterranean sea” – Street Art, Haifa.

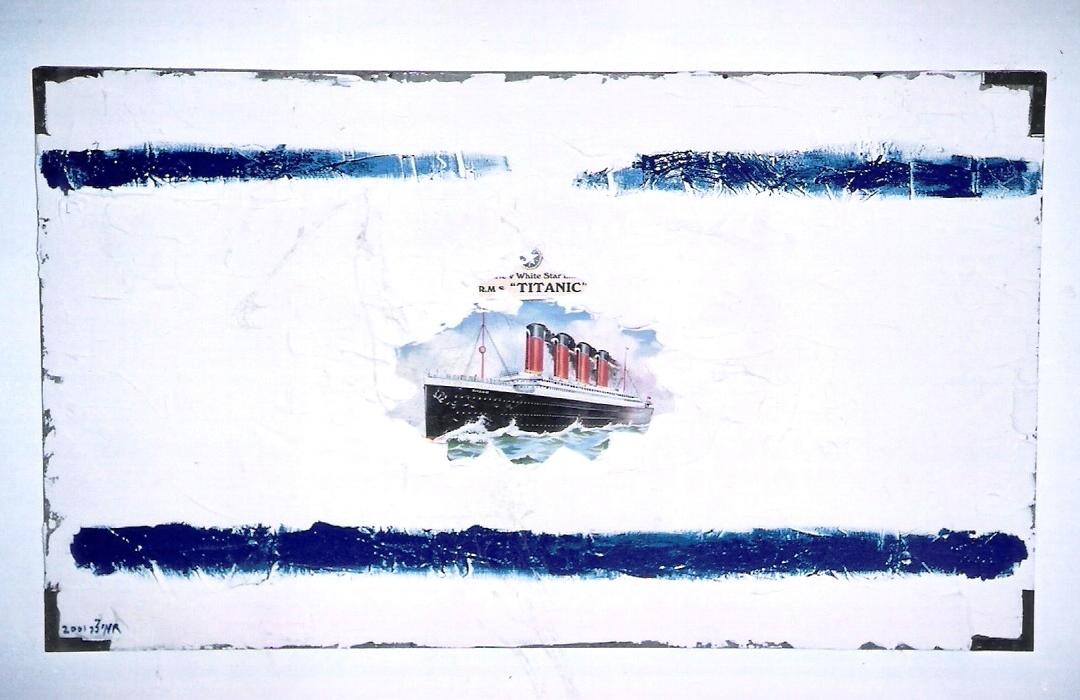
“The state of the nation” Ein Hod 2001.

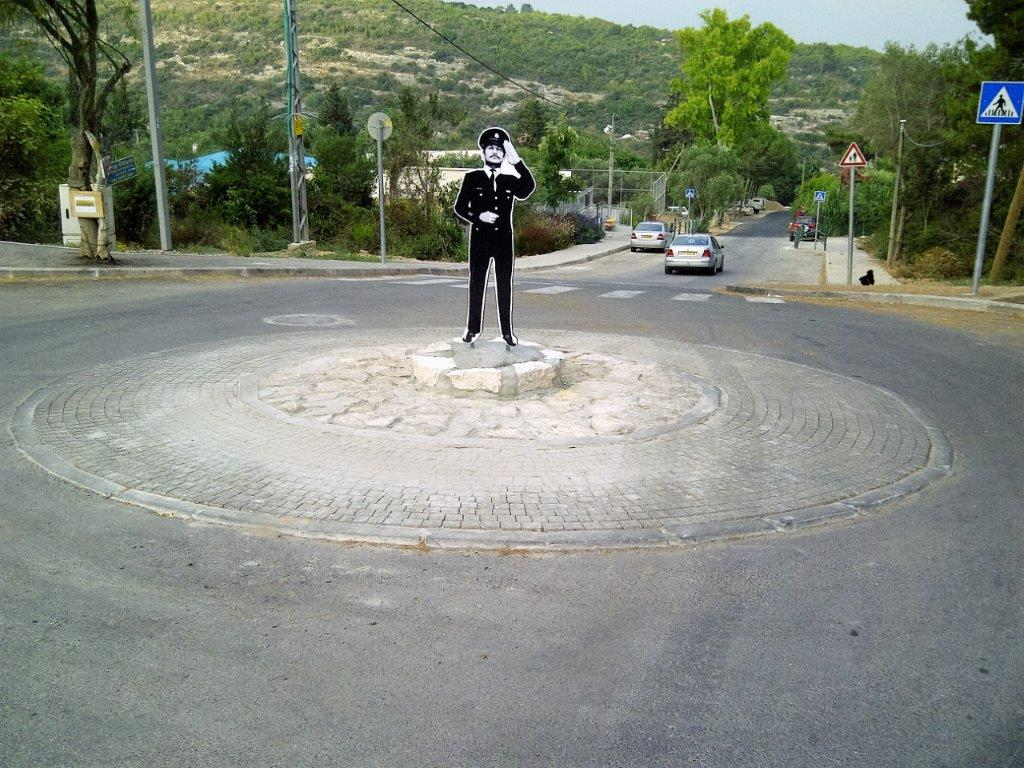
“Azulai the cop”– Street Art, Ein Hod.

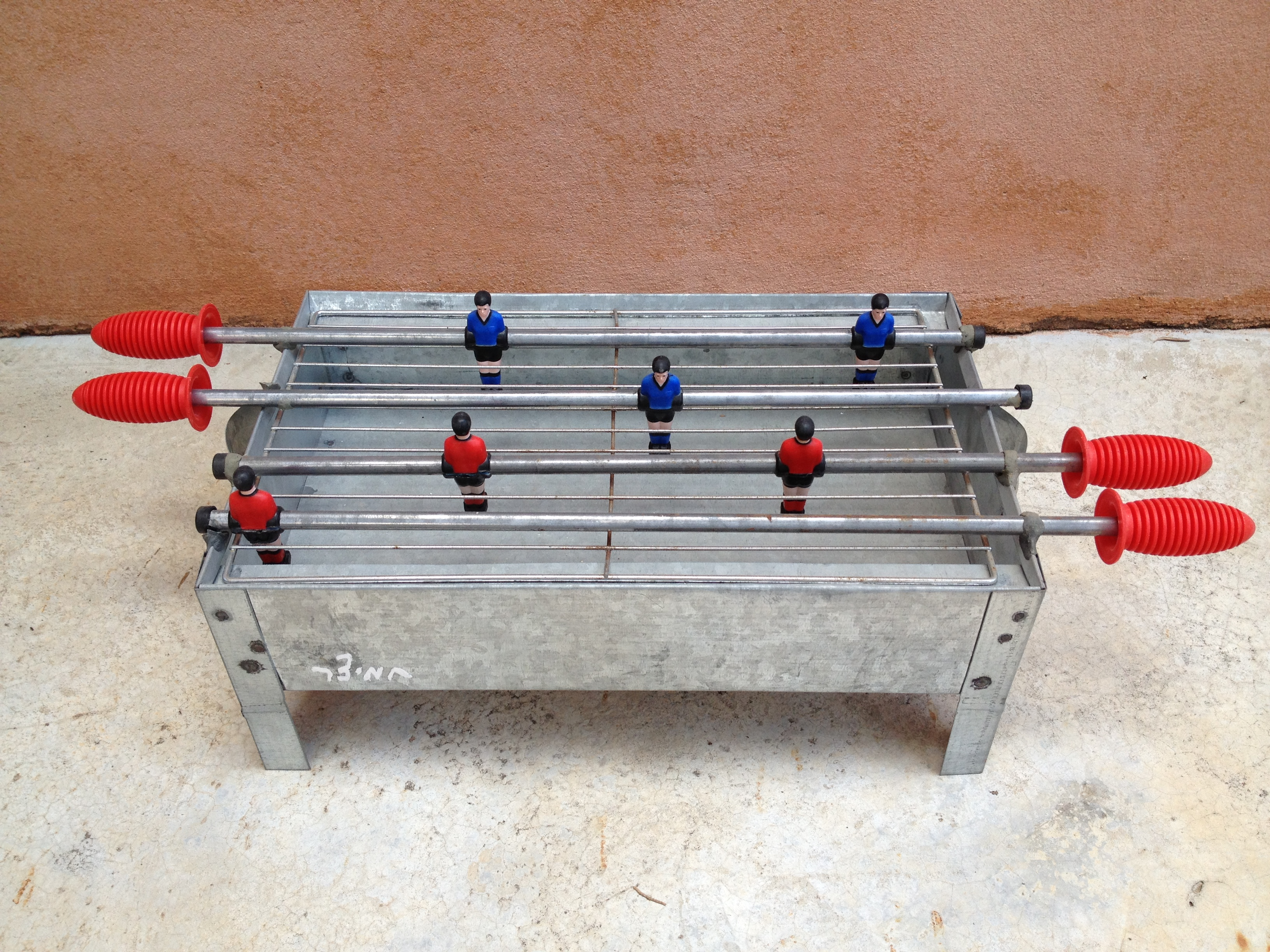
Table Football Playbox, Street Art, Ein Hod.

== Published works ==
=== Books ===
- Chamizer's book of riddles: From the mechanized Italian to the Iraqi finger (Keter, 1992)
- Panta Rei: Casualties in Grandma's trunk (Zmorah Bitan, 1998) – a biographical evocation of Chamizer's father, Emmanuel.

Children's books:

- Chidani in the animal kingdom (Matar, 2009)
- Chidani meets friends (Matar, 2010)
- Chidani protects the environment (Matar, 2011)

=== Poetry ===
- "Closed Formation" (1993 ) – includes poems by Chamizer's friend and fellow Arkia pilot, Trigg Messing (1923–89)
- Crash landing (1997 ) – Some of the poems from this book were composed and released on record by Dudu Elharar (1998).
- Eshet (2008)
