= Awlam =

Awlam عولم 'Ulam
- Etymology: possibly from the Arabic form of “a full well”
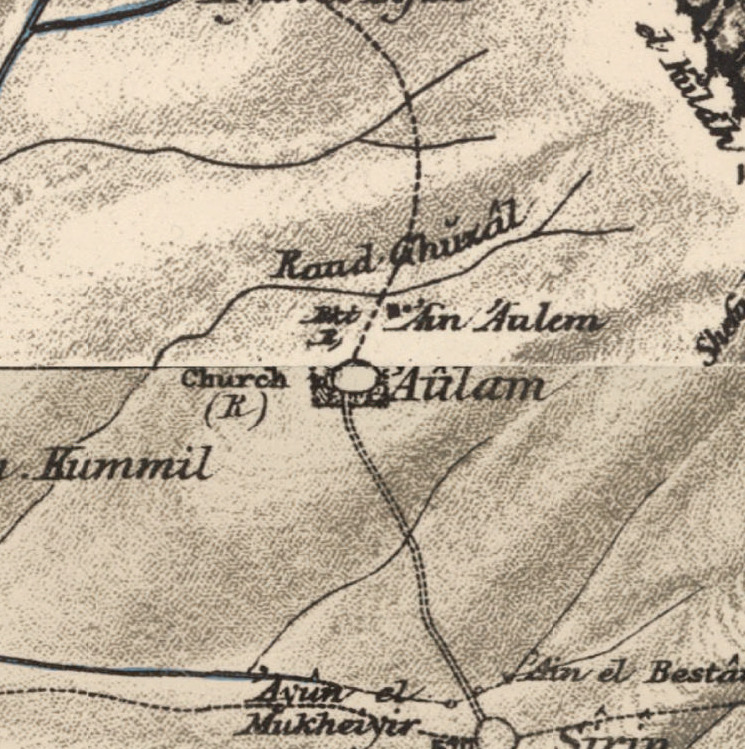
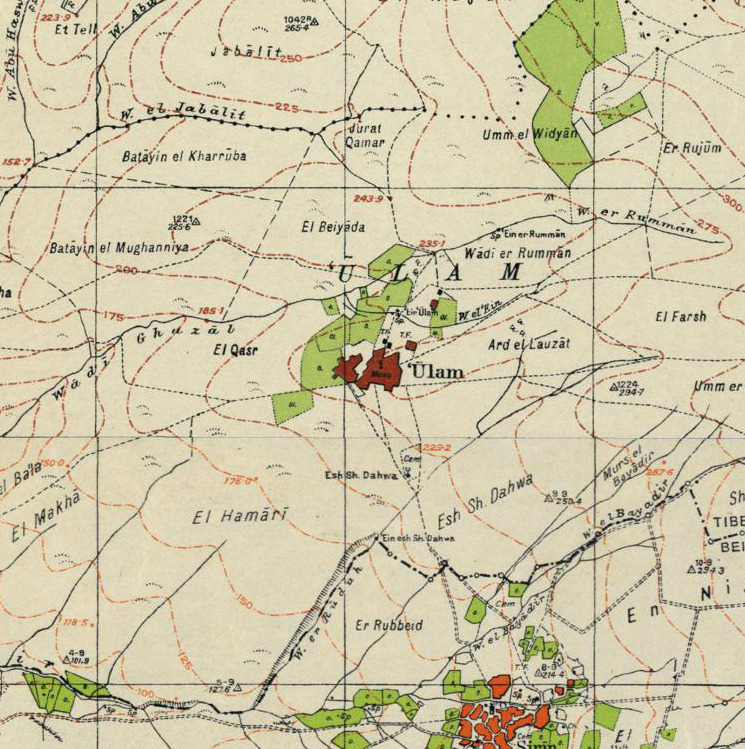
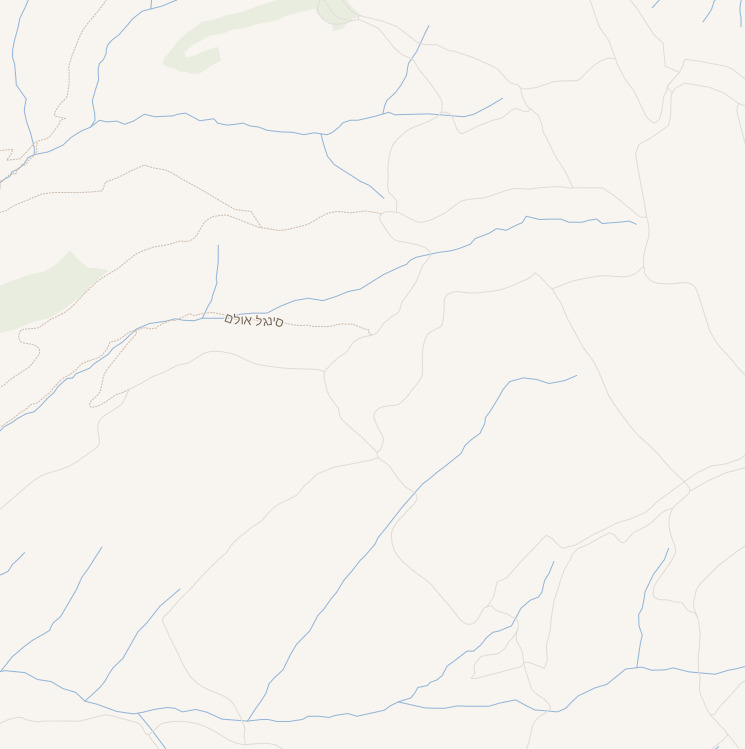
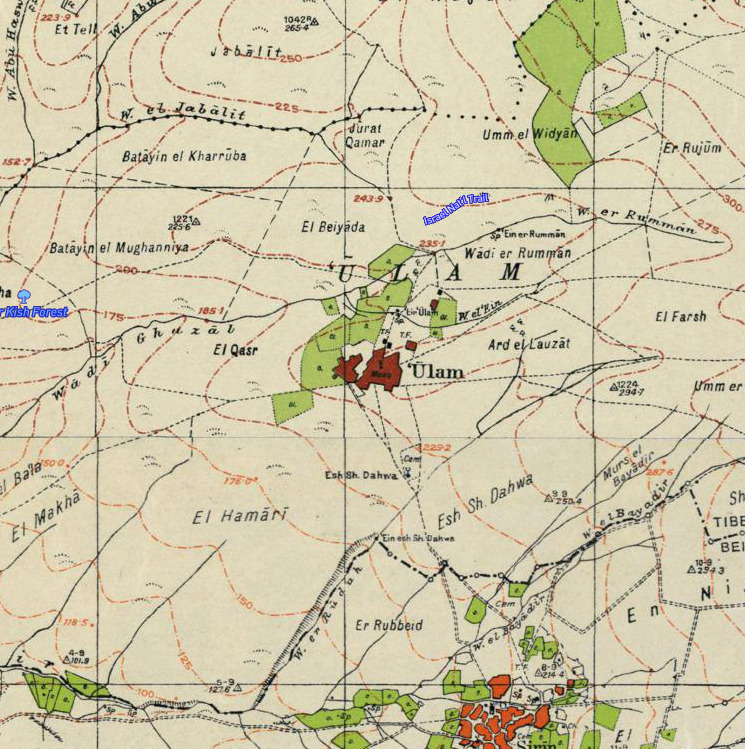
- 1870s map 1940s map modern map 1940s with modern overlay map A series of historical maps of the area around Awlam (click the buttons)

- Location within Mandatory Palestine
- Coordinates: 32°39′59″N 35°29′57″E
- Palestine grid: 197/230
- Geopolitical entity: Mandatory Palestine
- Subdistrict: Tiberias
- Date of depopulation: April 6, 1948

Area
  - Total: 18.5 km^{2} (7.1 sq mi)

Population (1945)
  - Total: 720
- Cause(s) of depopulation: Abandonment on Arab orders

'Awlam, also spelled 'Aulam and 'Ulam (Arabic: عولم), was a Palestinian village 15 kilometres (9.3 mi) south of Tiberias situated on the slopes of the westward Wadi Awlam.

In the late Ottoman period it was a ruin, resettled by Algerian migrants under the auspices of the Ottomans.

== History ==
Awlam is identified as Oulamma, an important town that existed during the Roman era of rule in Palestine.

Ceramics from the Byzantine era have been found here.

The Crusaders referred to it as Heulem. In 1144 the tithes of the village was given to the bishop of Tiberias. In 1174, the Bishop conceded its tithes to the church of Mount Tabor.

=== Ottoman era ===
Awlam was incorporated into the Ottoman Empire in 1517, and by 1596 it was a village under the administration of the nahiya ("subdistrict") of Tiberias, part of the sanjak of Safad. The village had a population of 12 households and 3 bachelors, an estimated 83 persons, all Muslims. They paid a fixed tax-rate of 25% on wheat, barley, goats, and beehives, in addition to occasional revenues; a total of 3,409 Akçe.

A map by Pierre Jacotin from Napoleon's invasion of 1799 showed the place, named as El Awalem.

In 1838 it was noted as a village, 'Aulam, in the Tiberias District.

In 1859 there were 120 souls in the village, and the cultivation was 14 feddans, according to the British consul Rogers. However, when Victor Guérin visited in 1875, he described the village as “abandoned”. He further noted;

“Ancient materials are plentiful there. I noticed in particular a number of column stumps and various fragments of sculptures coming from some building now destroyed. A church, converted later into a mosque, then into a stable, is quite well preserved. It had been built with alternately white and black stones, the former limestone, the latter basalt. On the lintel of the main entrance door one may observe, in the centre, a small circle, which formerly enclosed a cross, today completely effaced. Inside, some column shafts are lying on the ground, with their capitals broken.

In the late 19th century, Awlam was one of several villages settled by Algerian migrants under the auspices of the Ottoman Empire. The settlers in Awlam originated in Ein Bessem, Bouïra.

In 1882, it was described as an agricultural village of 120, built of adobe bricks. The Ottomans built an elementary school in this time period.

A population list from about 1887 showed Aulam to have about 575 inhabitants; all Muslims.

=== British Mandate era ===
The 'Arab al-Muwaylhat Bedouin tribe settled in the village by the time Awlam was a part of the British Mandate of Palestine. The village had a mosque, but its school was closed down.

In the 1922 census of Palestine, Ulam had a population of 496; 487 Muslims, 8 Jews and 1 Christian, where the one Christian was of the Orthodox faith. The population had increased to 555 in the 1931 census, all Muslims, in a total of 139 houses. The villagers cultivated grain, figs, grapes, and pomegranates. They drew their drinking and domestic water from six different springs.

By the 1945 statistics, the village population was 720 Muslims, and the total land area was 18,546 dunums of land. 360 dunams were irrigated or used for orchards, 11,139 used for cereals, while 28 dunams were classified as built-up (urban) land.

=== 1948, and aftermath ===
During the 1948 Arab-Israeli War, Awlam's villagers were ordered to leave on April 6, 1948, by the Arab Higher Committee who feared they might aid "Zionist forces". But the Haganah states that its Golani Brigade entered the village on May 12, and the inhabitants fled upon their arrival. Awlam became the final village in the eastern Lower Galilee emptied of its Arab inhabitants. According to Walid Khalidi, "nothing remains of the village buildings except stone rubble; only a spring that was used by the villagers has been left unchanged".

== Bibliography ==
- Barron, J. B., ed. (1923). Palestine: Report and General Abstracts of the Census of 1922. Government of Palestine.
- Conder, C.R.; Kitchener, H. H. (1882). The Survey of Western Palestine: Memoirs of the Topography, Orography, Hydrography, and Archaeology. Vol. 2. London: Committee of the Palestine Exploration Fund.
- Dauphin, C. (1998). La Palestine byzantine, Peuplement et Populations. BAR International Series 726 (in French). Vol. III : Catalogue. Oxford: Archeopress. ISBN 0-860549-05-4.
- Department of Statistics (1945). Village Statistics, April, 1945. Government of Palestine.
- Guérin, V. (1880). Description Géographique Historique et Archéologique de la Palestine (in French). Vol. 3: Galilee, pt. 1. Paris: L'Imprimerie Nationale.
- Hadawi, S. (1970). Village Statistics of 1945: A Classification of Land and Area ownership in Palestine. Palestine Liberation Organization Research Center.
- Hütteroth, W.-D.; Abdulfattah, K. (1977). Historical Geography of Palestine, Transjordan and Southern Syria in the Late 16th Century. Erlanger Geographische Arbeiten, Sonderband 5. Erlangen, Germany: Vorstand der Fränkischen Geographischen Gesellschaft. ISBN 3-920405-41-2.
- Karmon, Y. (1960). "An Analysis of Jacotin's Map of Palestine" (PDF). Israel Exploration Journal. 10 (3, 4): 155–173, 244–253. Archived from the original (PDF) on 2019-12-22.
- Khalidi, W. (1992). All That Remains: The Palestinian Villages Occupied and Depopulated by Israel in 1948. Washington D.C.: Institute for Palestine Studies. ISBN 0-88728-224-5.
- Mills, E., ed. (1932). Census of Palestine 1931. Population of Villages, Towns and Administrative Areas. Jerusalem: Government of Palestine.
- Morris, B. (2004). The Birth of the Palestinian Refugee Problem Revisited. Cambridge University Press. ISBN 978-0-521-00967-6.
- Palmer, E. H. (1881). The Survey of Western Palestine: Arabic and English Name Lists Collected During the Survey by Lieutenants Conder and Kitchener, R. E. Transliterated and Explained by E.H. Palmer. Committee of the Palestine Exploration Fund.
- Pringle, D. (1998). The Churches of the Crusader Kingdom of Jerusalem: L-Z (excluding Tyre). Vol. II. Cambridge University Press. ISBN 0-521-39037-0.
- Rhode, H. (1979). Administration and Population of the Sancak of Safed in the Sixteenth Century. Columbia University. Archived from the original on 2020-03-01.
- Robinson, E.; Smith, E. (1841). Biblical Researches in Palestine, Mount Sinai and Arabia Petraea: A Journal of Travels in the year 1838. Vol. 3. Boston: Crocker & Brewster.
- Röhricht, R. (1893). (RRH) Regesta regni Hierosolymitani (MXCVII-MCCXCI) (in Latin). Berlin: Libraria Academica Wageriana.
- Schumacher, G. (1888). "Population list of the Liwa of Akka". Quarterly Statement - Palestine Exploration Fund. 20: 169–191.
