= Hadatha =

- Etymology: "new"
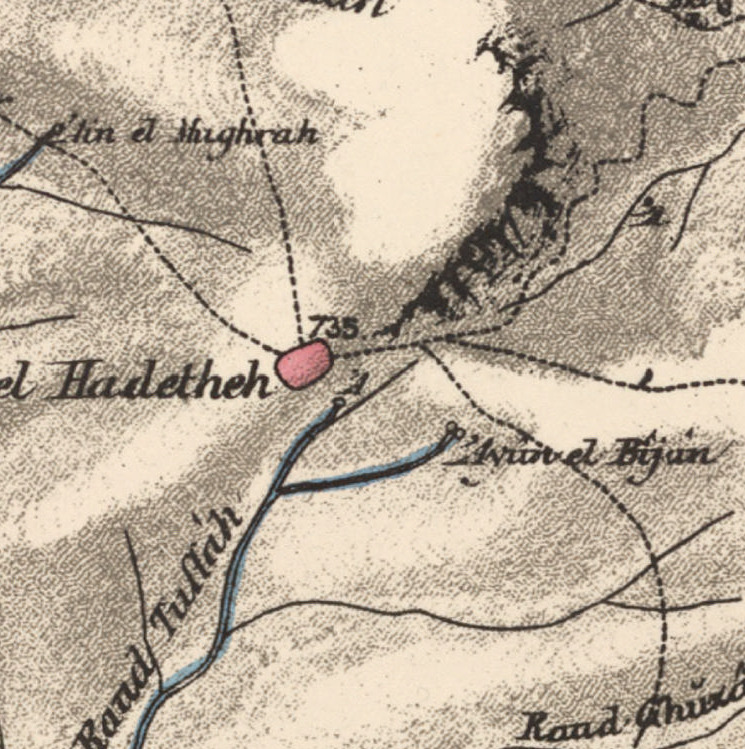
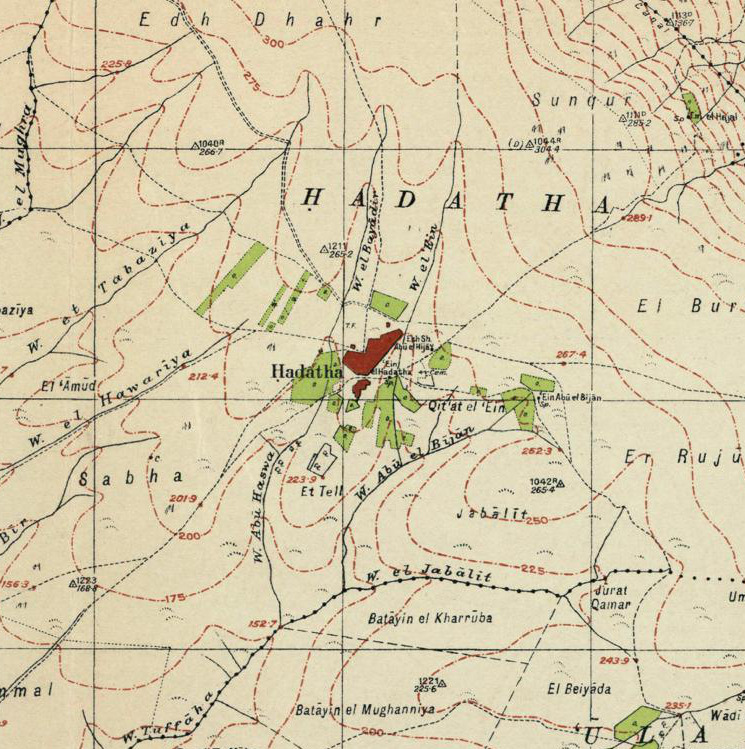
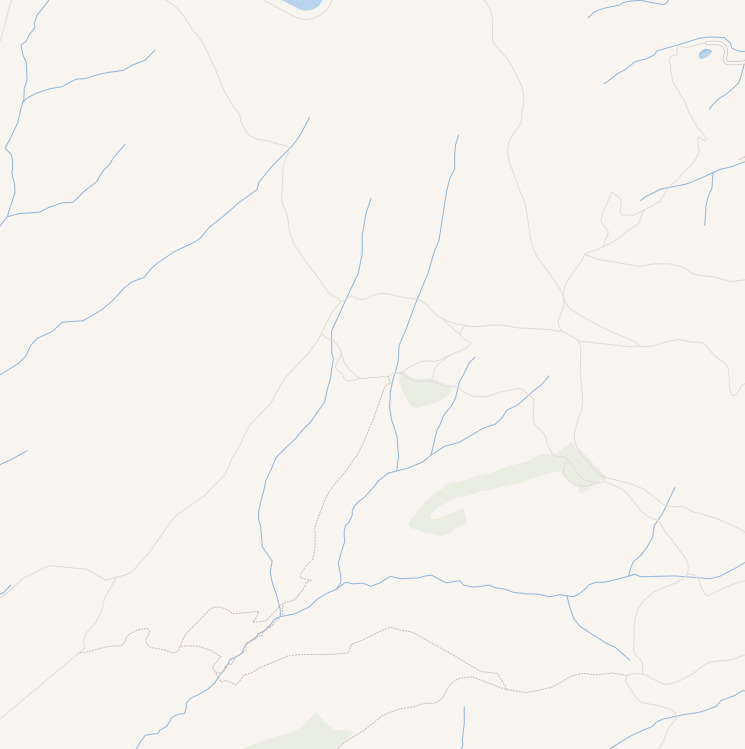
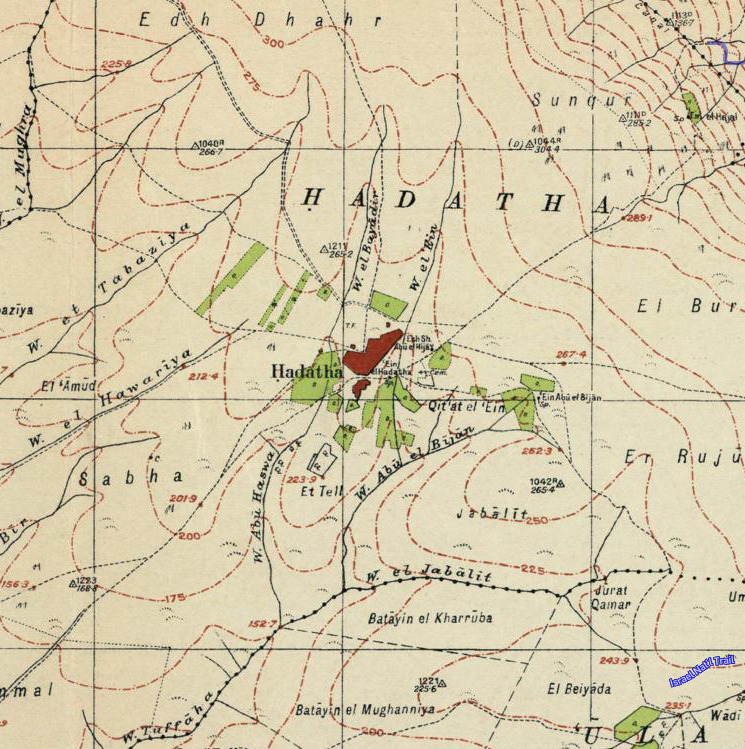
- 1870s map 1940s map modern map 1940s with modern overlay map A series of historical maps of the area around Hadatha (click the buttons)

- Location within Mandatory Palestine
- Coordinates: 32°40′59″N 35°29′19″E
- Palestine grid: 196/232
- Geopolitical entity: Mandatory Palestine
- Subdistrict: Tiberias
- Date of depopulation: May 12, 1948

Area
  - Total: 10,310 dunams (10.31 km^{2}; 3.98 sq mi)

Population (1945)
  - Total: 520
- Cause(s) of depopulation: Abandonment on Arab orders

Hadatha, also El Hadetheh or Hadateh, was a Palestinian Arab village in the District of Tiberias, located 12.5 km southwest of Tiberias. It was depopulated in the 1947–1948 civil war in Mandatory Palestine.

== History ==
Ceramics from the late Roman and Byzantine era have been found.

According to tradition, Hadatha was one of the "Al-Hija" villages named after Emir Hussam al-Din Abu al-Hija. Abu al-Hija ("the Daring") was a Kurdish commander that partook in Sultan Saladin's conquest (1187–93) of the Crusader Kingdom of Jerusalem. He was renowned for his bravery, and commanded the garrison of Acre at the time of the Siege of Acre (1189–1192).

Abu al-Hija apparently returned to Iraq, but several members of his family remained in the country under orders from Saladin, and these family members settled on large tracts of land that they were given in the Carmel region, in the Lower, Eastern and Western Galilee, and in the Hebron Highlands. Self-proclaimed kinsmen of al-Hija settled in the villages of Hadatha and Sirin in the Lower Galilee, and Ruweis and Kawkab in the Western Galilee. By tradition the descendants today still claim to be blood relations of al-Hija.

=== Ottoman era ===
In 1596, Hadatha was part of the Ottoman Empire, and the tax register of that year revealed a population of 121. All the villagers were Muslim. A map from Napoleon's invasion of 1799 by Pierre Jacotin showed the place, named as El Hadaci.

Victor Guérin, who visited in 1875, noted: "Some of the houses, which are still inhabited, have been constructed of good cut stones taken from some old buildings and mixed with small materials. On the slopes of the hill are found some ten shafts of columns lying scattered about the ground. They are the remains of a monument totally destroyed".

In 1881, the PEF's Survey of Western Palestine (SWP) described El Hadetheh as: "Stone village, containing 250 Moslems, on cultivated plain, growing barley, etc. No trees or gardens near. Good spring of water and cisterns in the village". They further noted that there was a "Spring on south-east side; good supply of water, perennial; a small stream flowing from it in winter and spring."

A population list from about 1887 showed el Hadatheh to have about 1,100 inhabitants; all Muslims.

=== British Mandate of Palestine ===
In the 1922 census of Palestine, conducted by the British Mandate authorities, Hadatheh had a population of 333, all Muslim, increasing in the 1931 census to 368; 1 Christian, 1 Druze and 366 Muslims, in a total of 75 houses.

By the 1945 statistics, the village population was 520 Muslims, and the total land area was 10,310 dunams (10.31 km^{2}; 3.98 sq mi). 199 dunams (0.199 km^{2}; 0.077 sq mi) were irrigated or used for orchards, 8,379 dunams (8.379 km^{2}; 3.235 sq mi) were used for cereals, and 38 dunams (0.038 km^{2}; 0.015 sq mi) were built-up (urban) land.

=== 1948 and aftermath ===
According to Morris, the village was abandoned during the 1947–1948 Civil War in Mandatory Palestine on May 12, 1948, under the orders of the Arab Higher Committee. However, Khalidi noted an inconsistency in the account, since the History of Haganah wrote that "the inhabitants fled in fear of the Jews".

In 1992, it was noted that though there were no settlements on village land, the inhabitants of Kefar Qish were cultivating the surrounding lands. A number of Hadatha's dispossessed inhabitants resettled in Tamra, near Acre, during the 1950s.

== Bibliography ==
- Barron, J. B., ed. (1923). Palestine: Report and General Abstracts of the Census of 1922. Government of Palestine.
- Benvenisti, M. (2000). Sacred landscape: the buried history of the Holy Land since 1948 (Illustrated ed.). University of California Press. ISBN 0-520-21154-5.
- Conder, C.R.; Kitchener, H. H. (1881). The Survey of Western Palestine: Memoirs of the Topography, Orography, Hydrography, and Archaeology. Vol. 1. London: Committee of the Palestine Exploration Fund.
- Dauphin, C. (1998). La Palestine byzantine, Peuplement et Populations. BAR International Series 726 (in French). Vol. III : Catalogue. Oxford: Archeopress. ISBN 9780860549055.
- Department of Statistics (1945). Village Statistics, April, 1945. Government of Palestine.
- Guérin, V. (1880). Description Géographique Historique et Archéologique de la Palestine (in French). Vol. 3: Galilee, pt. 1. Paris: L'Imprimerie Nationale.
- Hadawi, S. (1970). Village Statistics of 1945: A Classification of Land and Area ownership in Palestine. Palestine Liberation Organization Research Center.
- Hütteroth, W.-D.; Abdulfattah, K. (1977). Historical Geography of Palestine, Transjordan and Southern Syria in the Late 16th Century. Erlanger Geographische Arbeiten, Sonderband 5. Erlangen, Germany: Vorstand der Fränkischen Geographischen Gesellschaft. ISBN 3-920405-41-2.
- Karmon, Y. (1960). "An Analysis of Jacotin's Map of Palestine" (PDF). Israel Exploration Journal. 10 (3, 4): 155–173, 244–253. Archived from the original (PDF) on 2019-12-22.
- Khalidi, W. (1992). All That Remains: The Palestinian Villages Occupied and Depopulated by Israel in 1948. Washington D.C.: Institute for Palestine Studies. ISBN 0-88728-224-5.
- Mills, E., ed. (1932). Census of Palestine 1931. Population of Villages, Towns and Administrative Areas. Jerusalem: Government of Palestine.
- Morris, B. (2004). The Birth of the Palestinian Refugee Problem Revisited. Cambridge University Press. ISBN 978-0-521-00967-6.
- Palmer, E.H. (1881). The Survey of Western Palestine: Arabic and English Name Lists Collected During the Survey by Lieutenants Conder and Kitchener, R. E. Transliterated and Explained by E.H. Palmer. Committee of the Palestine Exploration Fund.
- Rhode, H. (1979). Administration and Population of the Sancak of Safed in the Sixteenth Century. Columbia University. Archived from the original on 2020-03-01.
- Rosenfeld, Henry; Al-Haj, Majid (1990). Arab Local Government in Israel. Westview Press. ISBN 0-8133-7761-7.
- Schumacher, G. (1888). "Population list of the Liwa of Akka". Quarterly Statement - Palestine Exploration Fund. 20: 169–191.
- Thomson, W.M. (1882). The Land and the Book: Or, Biblical Illustrations Drawn from the Manners and Customs, the Scenes and Scenery, of the Holy Land: Central Palestine and Phænicia. Vol. 2. New York: Harper & brothers. (Thomson, 1882, p. 329)
