= Hiking in Israel =

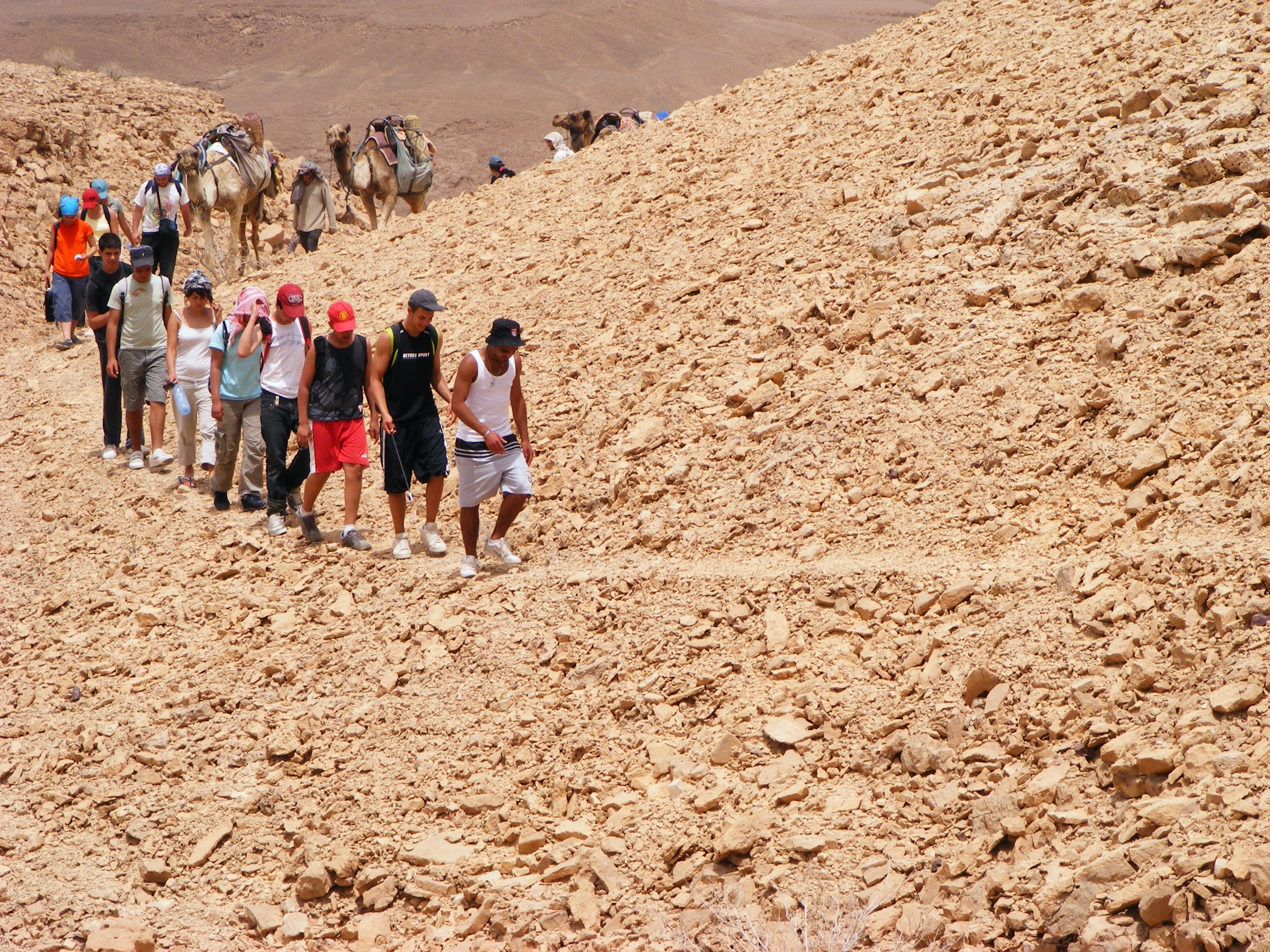
Hiking in Israel

Hiking in Israel encompasses over 9,656 km (6,000 miles) of trails . In May 2015, Google Street View, in cooperation with the Society for the Protection of Nature in Israel (SPNI), announced plans to photograph the full length of the 1,100 km (683 mi) Israel National Trail, which was included in the National Geographic feature "World's Best Hikes: Epic Trails".

== Trails ==
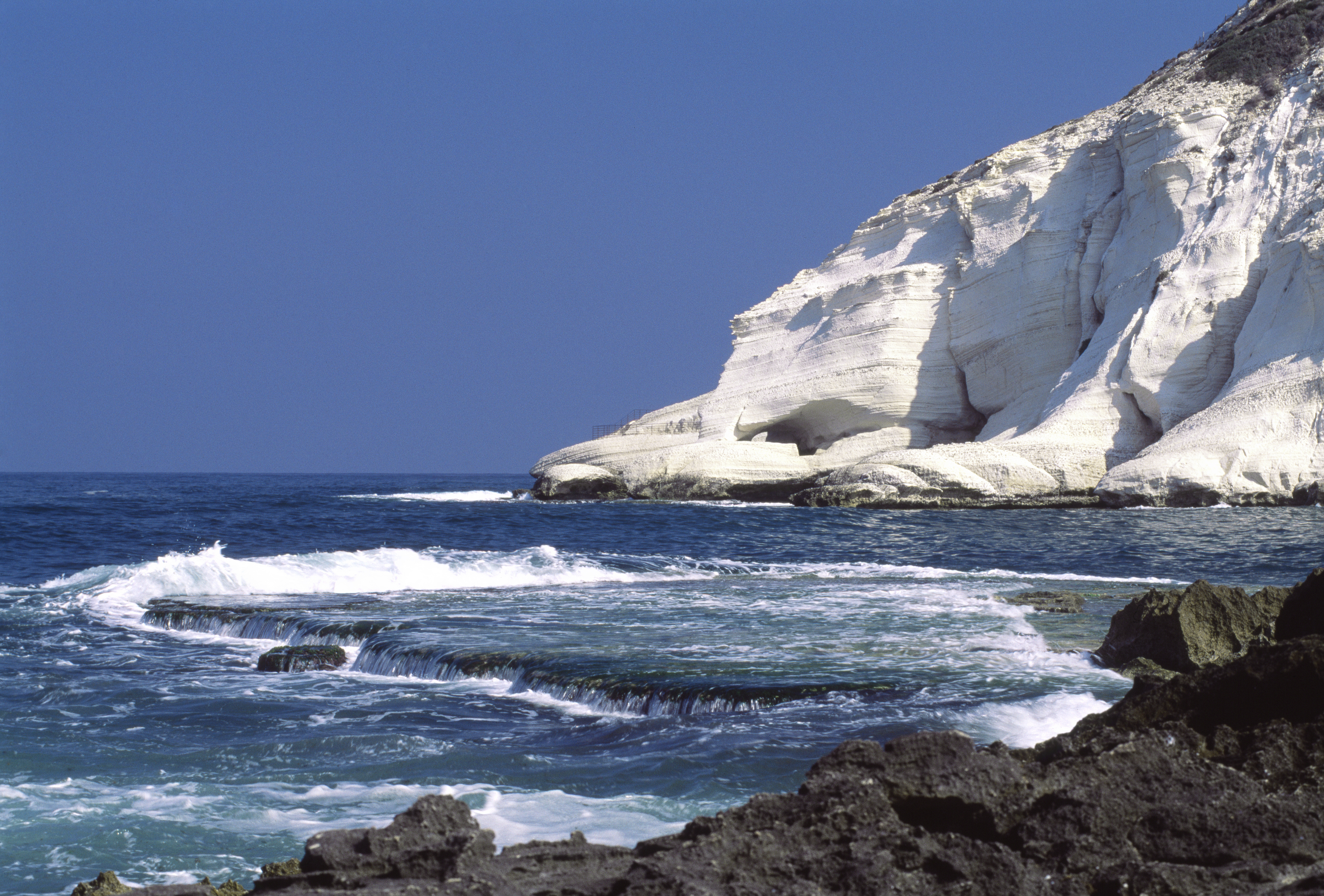
Cliffs and grottoes of Rosh Hanikra

=== Nahal Katlav Trail ===
Beginning in the Bar Giora area, the trail passes by a spring, a dry riverbed, the Bar Giora train station, and an abandoned Arab village. The trail loop takes approximately 4 hours to complete.

=== Burma Road Trail ===
This trail passes through the Park Rabin pine forest and into the village of Beit Meir, where the trail splits from the Burma Road and continues into the Forest of the Martyrs. The trail loop takes approximately 3.5 hours to complete and offers a bike rental shop.

=== Nahal David Trail ===
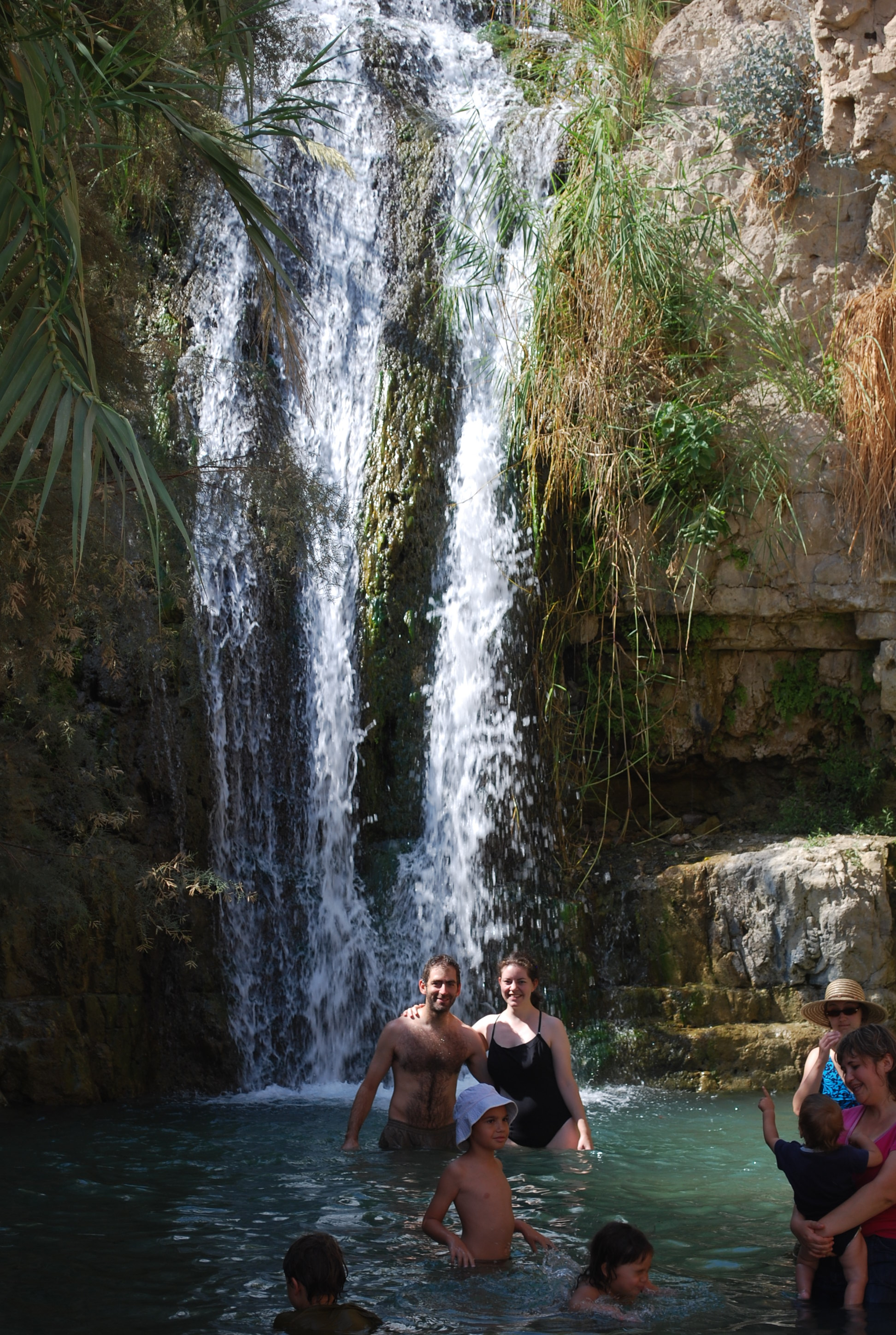
Ein Gedi

The trail passes David's Waterfall, a canyon, the Ein Gedi spring, and the Chalcolithic Temple of Ein Gedi. This trail takes approximately 5 hours to complete and requires an entrance fee of approximately $5 USD.

=== Nahal Dragot Trail (a.k.a. Wadi Darga) ===
This trail traverses 50 meter- (164 ft-) high walls, dray waterfalls, and craters filled with water. This trail requires rope to complete.

=== Wadi Qelt Trail ===
This trail leads through the Wadi Qelt area and passes Ein Prat and Nahal Qelt. The trail passes pools and picnic areas and forks toward either Pisgat Ze'ev or Jericho to the east. The eastern fork passes through a water-filled gorge. The trail ends at the St. George's Monastery. The eastern fork of the trail does not loop back to its start. The Wadi Qelt Trail takes approximately 6 hours to complete. The trail has limited parking.

=== Nahal Og Trail ===
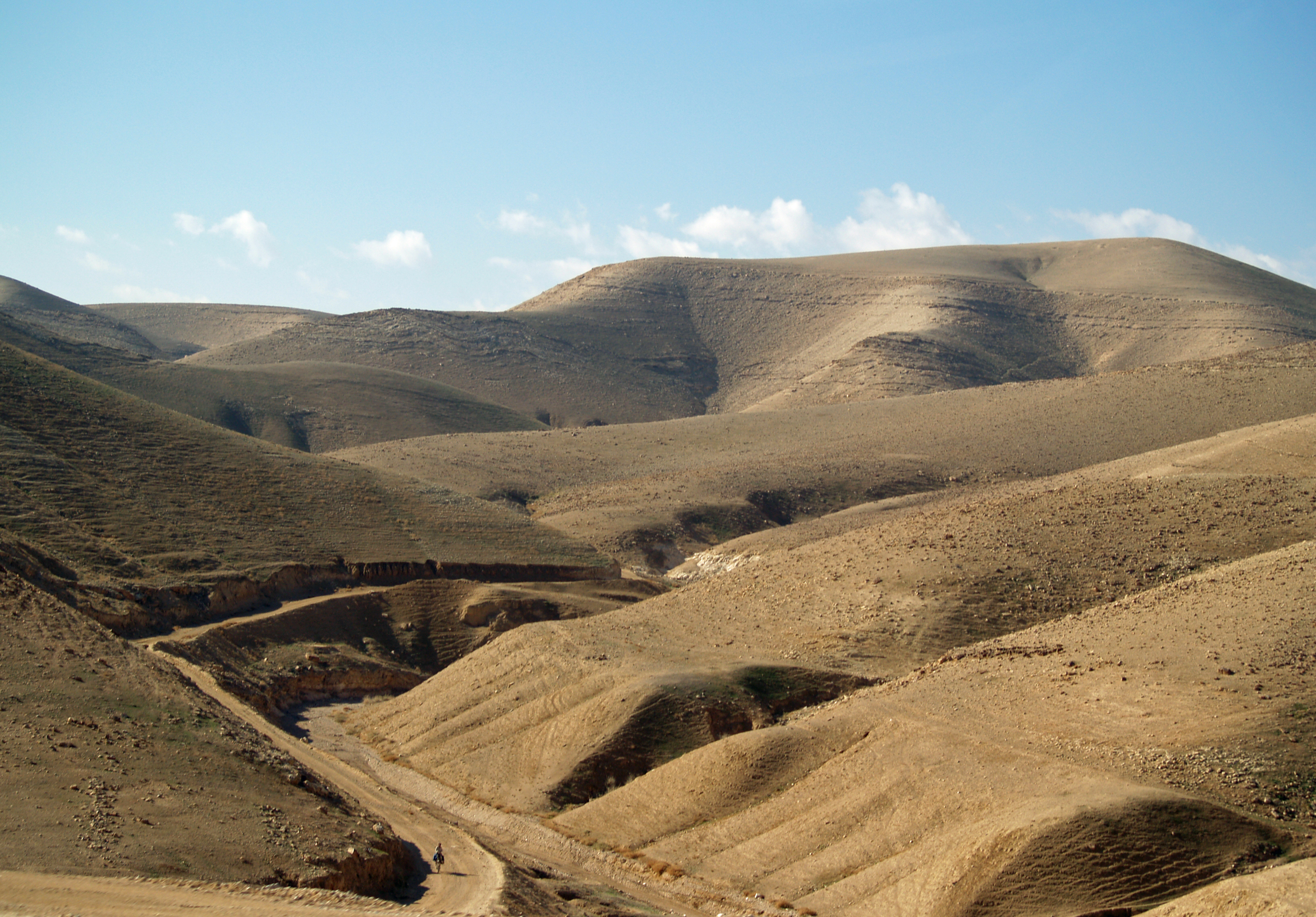
Judean Mountains

This trail leads through several white chalk canyons. Most of the trail is flat, but it does pass down several near-vertical cliffs via rungs drilled into the mountain's side. This trail does not loop, and experiences flash floods during rain. The trail takes approximately 3 hours to complete.

=== Amram’s Pillars/The Black Canyon Trail ===
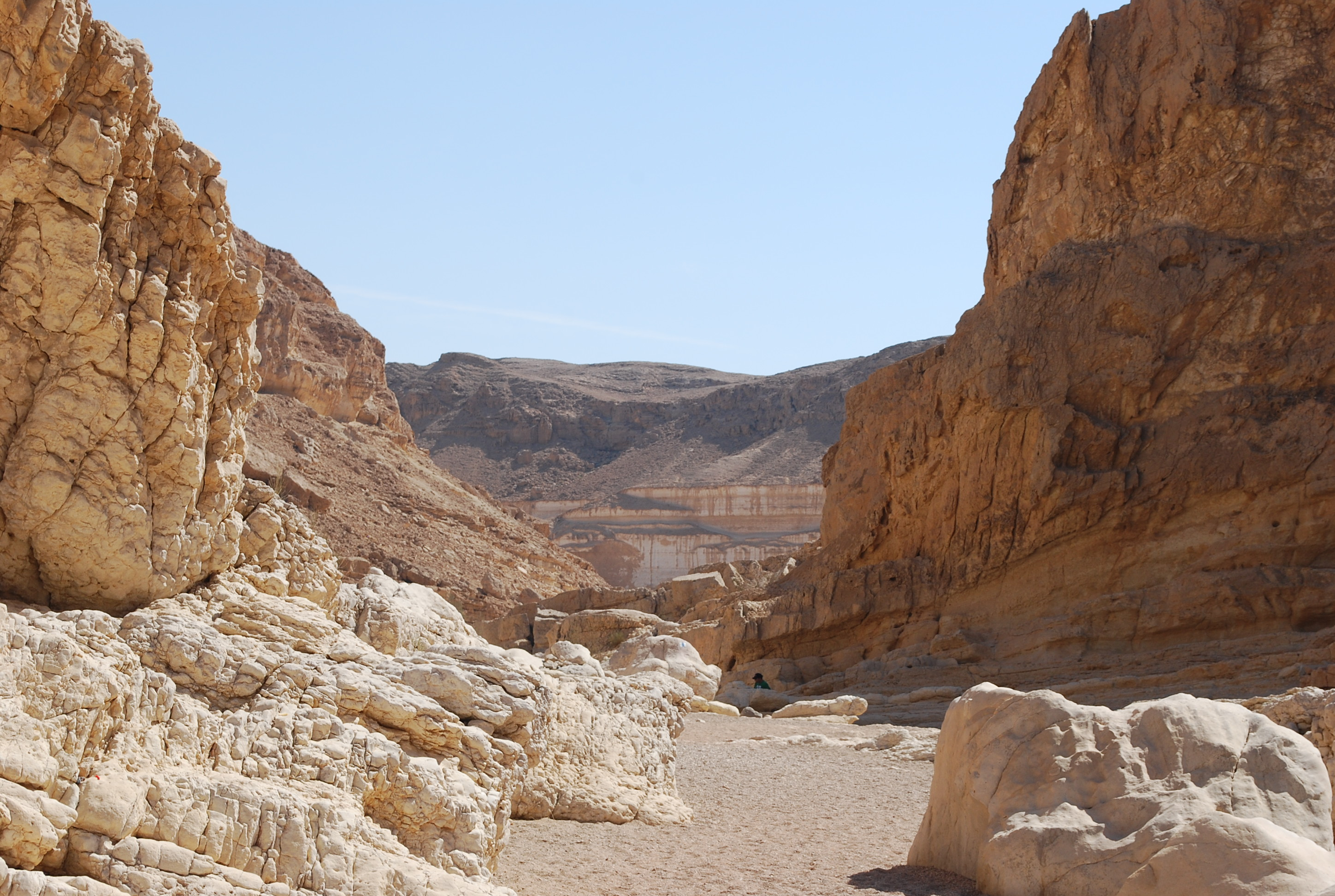
Hiking in Makhtesh Ramon

This trail begins at Amram's Pillars and leads up Mount Amir, where it forks in two toward either the Israel National Trail or through a canyon with copper mines. Both forks end near Black Canyon. The trail does not loop, and takes approximately 4 hours to complete.

=== Mount Zefachot Trail ===
This trail ascends Mount Zefachot, where there are several forks leading back down.

=== Nahal Amud Trail ===
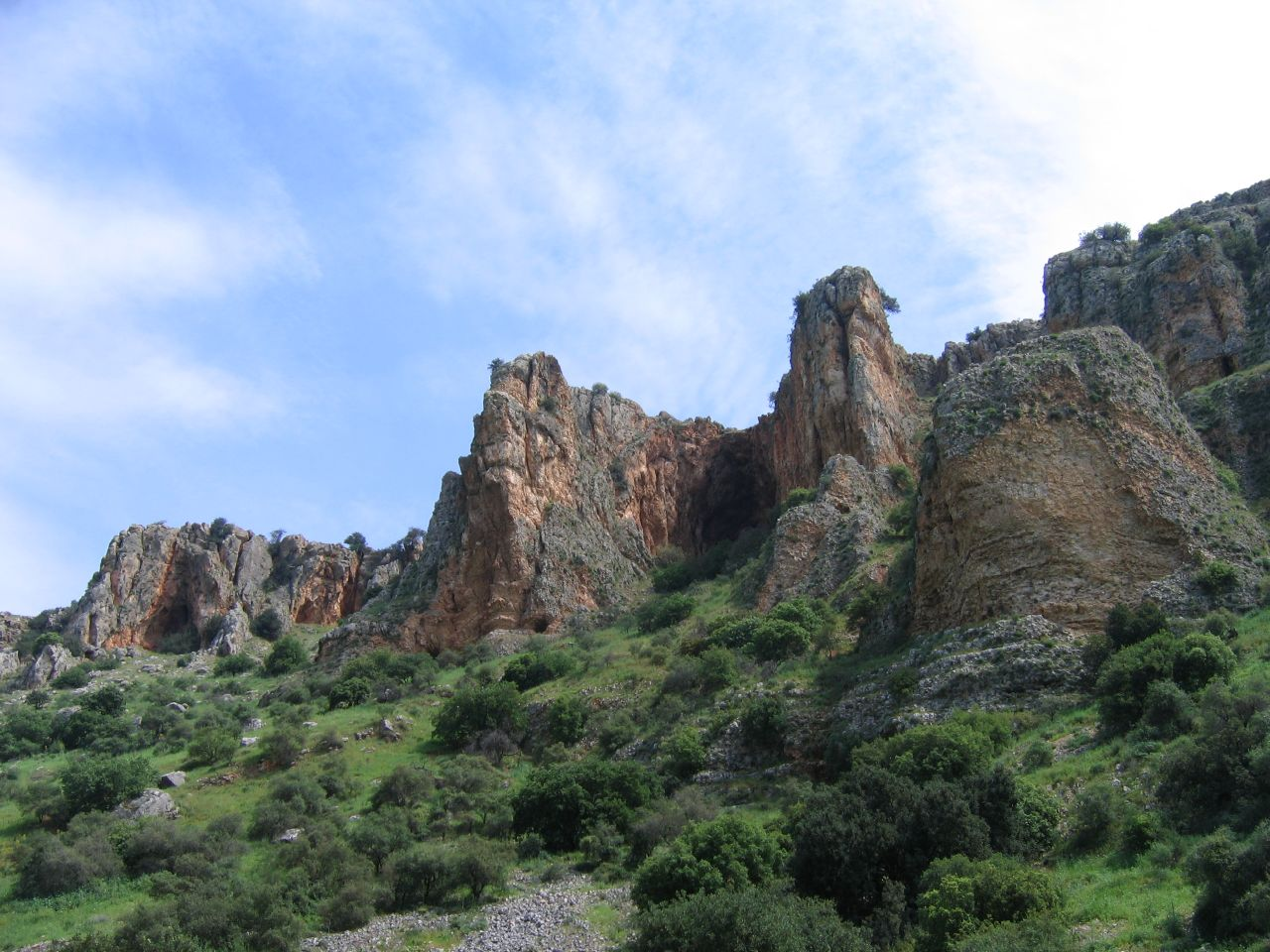
Nahal Amud cliffs

Beginning from Mount Meron, this trail parallels the Israel National Trail and passes pools and ancient flour mills. This trail is a national park with an entry fee, and takes approximately 5 hours to complete.

=== Upper Nahal Yehudiah Trail ===
This trail passes a deserted Syrian village and a cattle-grazing field. The trail then leads down two cliffs via rungs and ladders drilled into the rock. The trail requires swimming through water before looping back. The trail takes approximately 5 hours to complete.

=== Jerusalem Trail ===
This trail connects the Israel National Trail to Jerusalem. The trail passes several of Jerusalem's landmarks, including the Old City, the Mount of Olives, the Kidron Valley, and others. This trail loops and is 42 km (26 mi) long and takes approximately two days to complete.

=== Jesus Trail ===
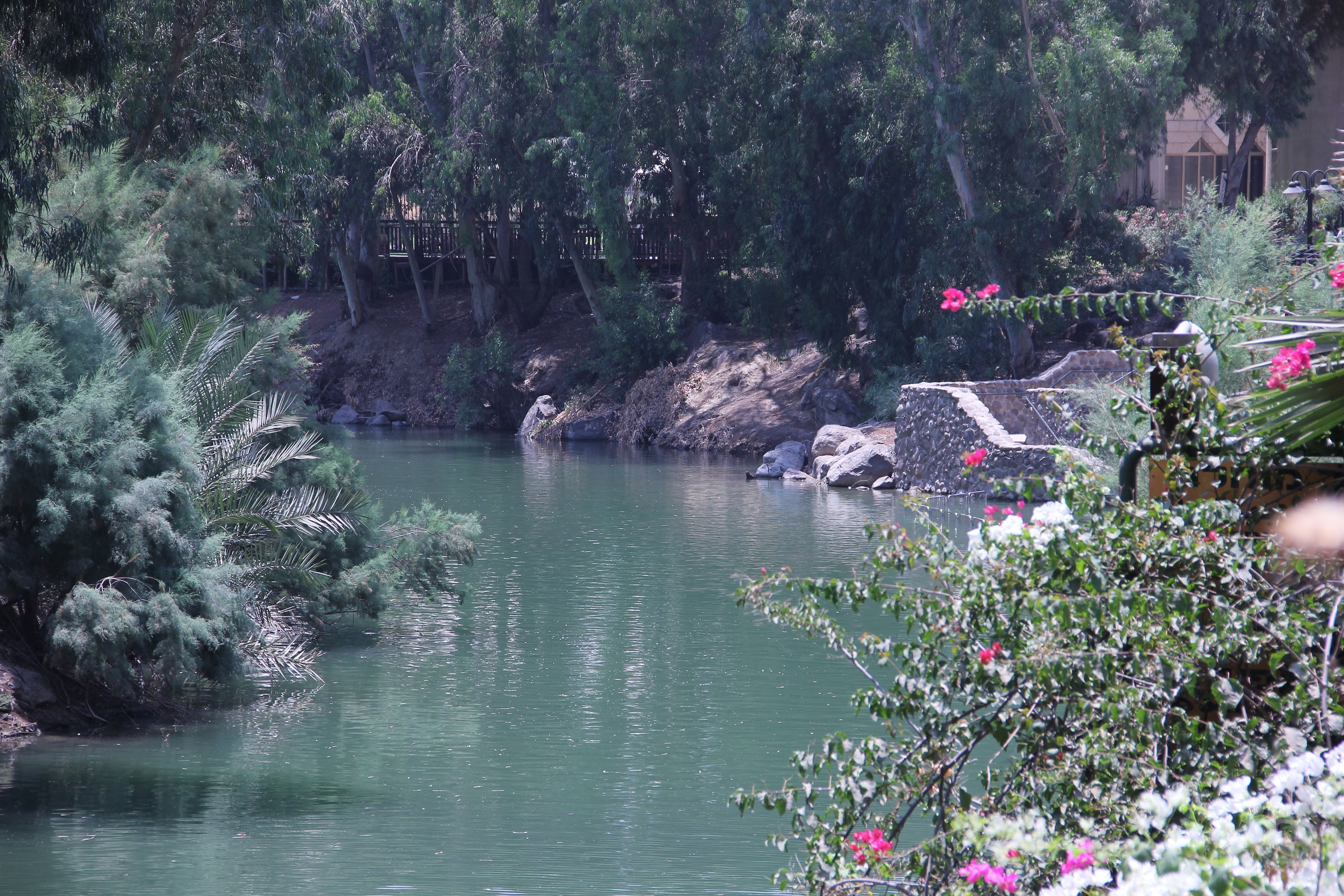
Yardenit baptism site, Jordan River

This trail begins in Nazareth and passes tourist sites related to the life and ministry of Jesus, including Tzippori, the Sea of Galilee, the Horns of Hattin, and several other sites. The trail is a 60 km (40 mi) long and takes approximately 4 days to complete.

=== Israel National Trail ===
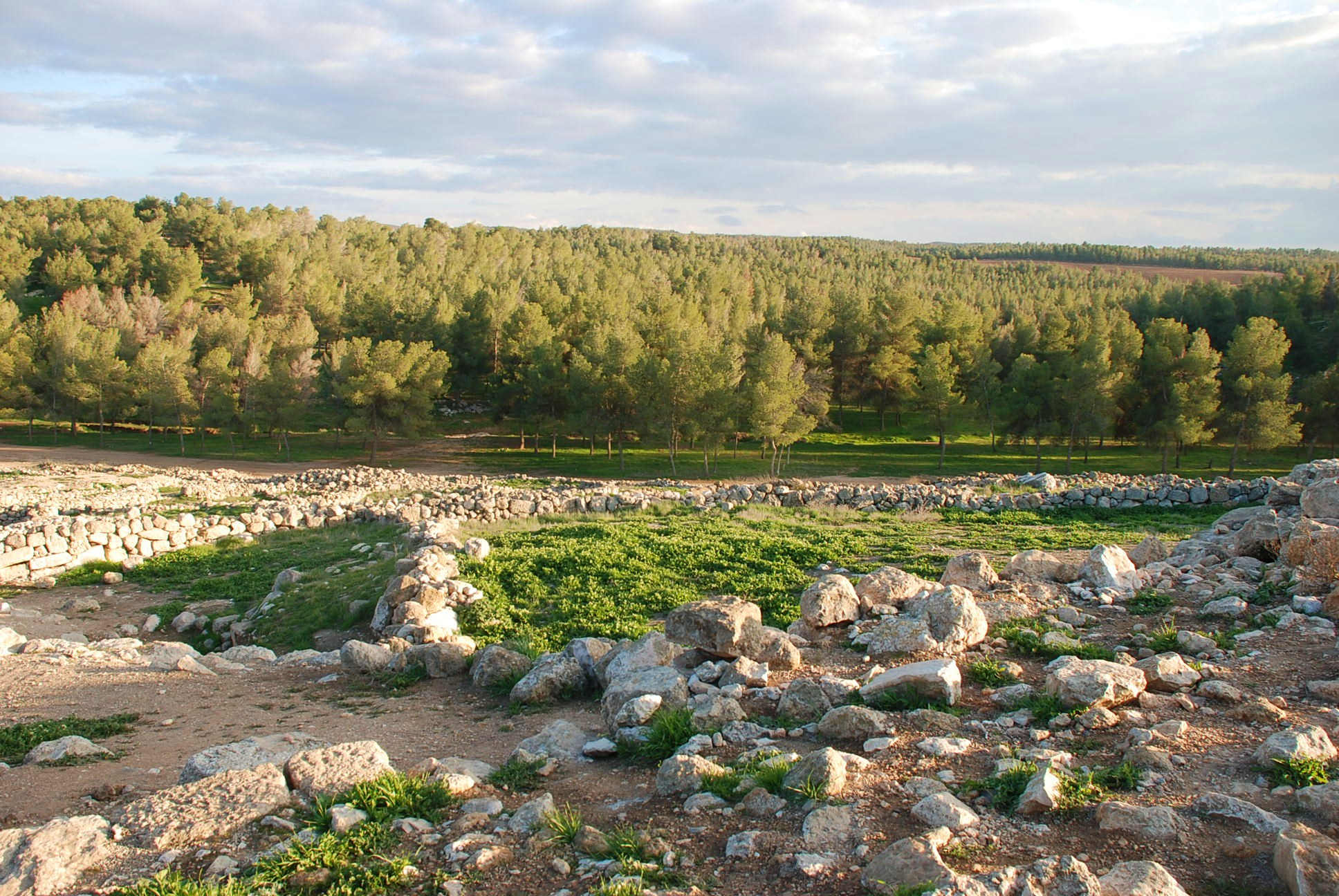
Yatir Forest and ancient ruins

This trail passes through the entire country of Israel, beginning at Dan and ending at Eilat. The trail is 960 km (596 miles) long and takes approximately 60 days to complete.

=== Sea to sea trail ===
The Sea to sea hiking trail leads from the Mediterranean Sea to the Sea of Galilee. It passes through Abirim, Mount Meron, Ein Koves, and other tourist sites. The trail is 80 km (50 mi) long and takes approximately 4 days to complete.

== Awards and recognition ==
The Israel National Trail was included in the National Geographic feature "World's Best Hikes: Epic Trails".

== See also ==
- Abraham Path – a cultural route believed to have been the path of patriarch Abraham’s journey across the Ancient Near East.
- Jordan Trail
- National Parks of Israel
- Geography of Israel
