= Darom Adom =

Annual Israeli festival

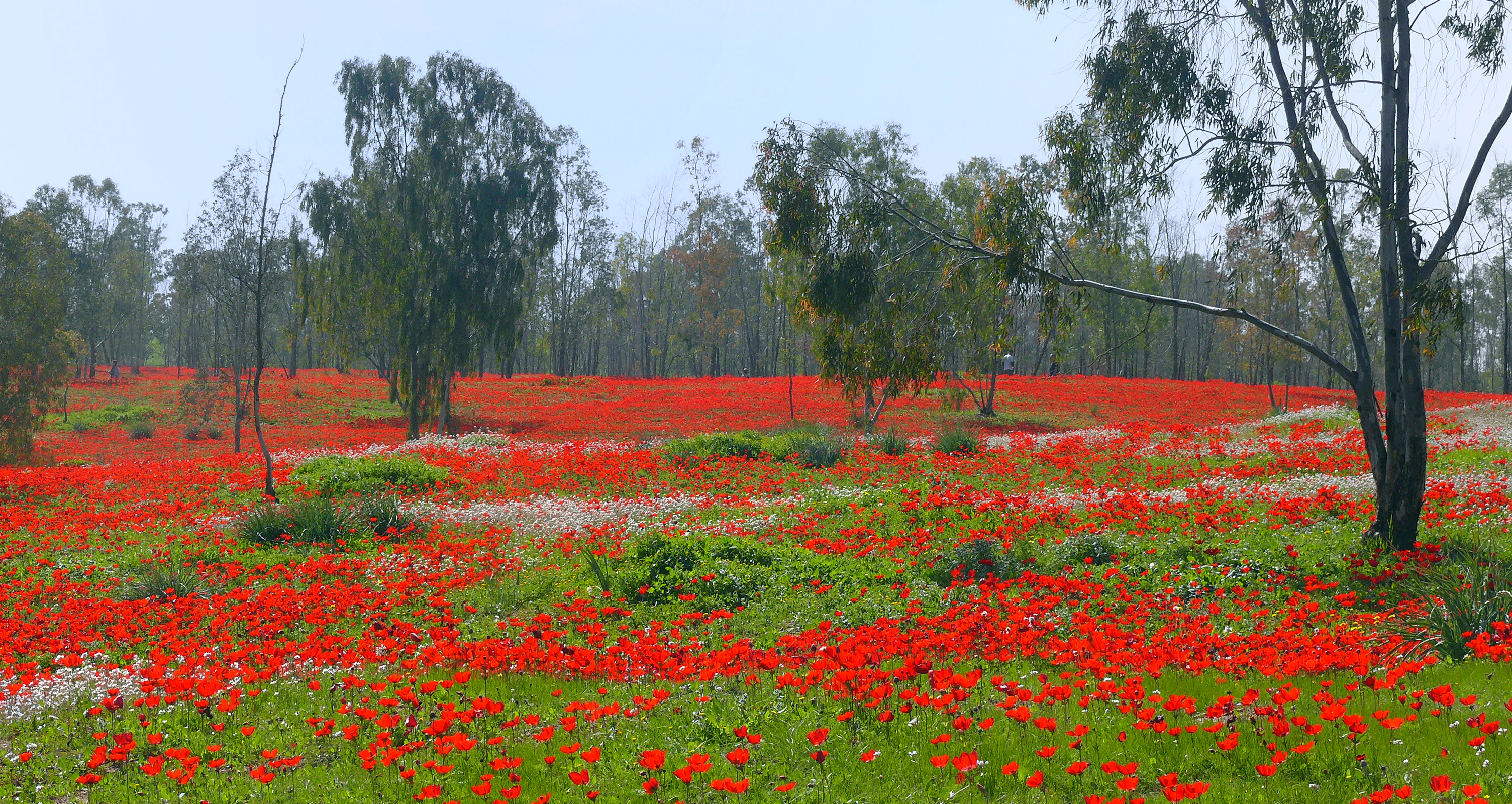
Red Anemone in Shokeda Forest, Shokeda, 2012

Darom Adom (Hebrew: דָרוֹם אָדוֹם, lit. 'lit. red south') is an annual Israeli festival, held usually from mid-January till the end of February, during the anemone flower's blossoming season in the northern Negev region of Israel.

== History ==
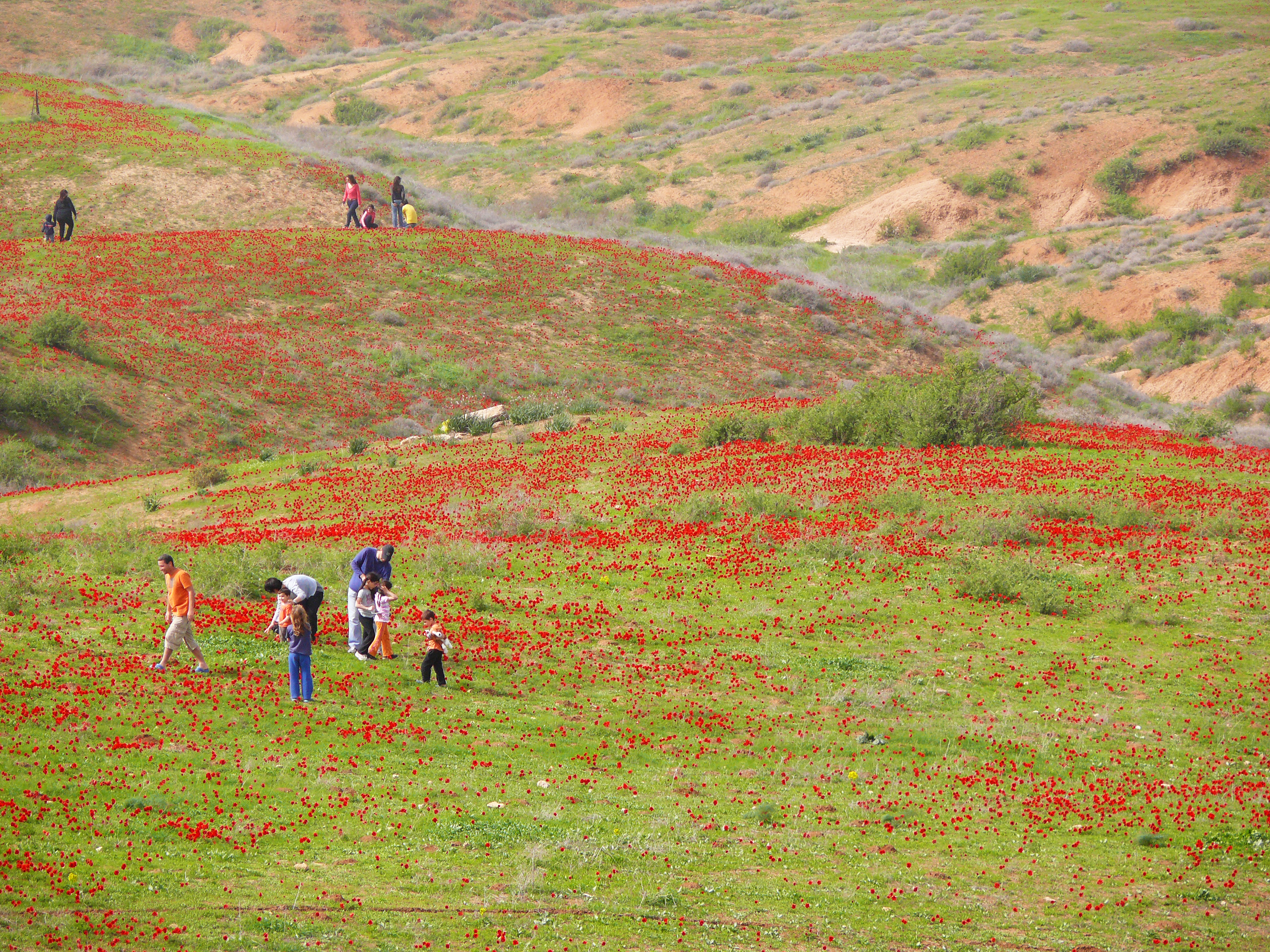
Pura natural park

The initial idea of the establishment of the festival dates back to 2007, when locals realized that travelers coming to the northern Negev for the anemone blossoming are unaware of the many places they can go to in the area, and the wide selection of activities and excursions that the area has to offer.

The festival is called Darom Adom (literally Red South) because of the color of the red color of the Anemone flower blossoming in the area, dyeing acres after acres of the land in red.

The festival takes place from mid-January until the end of February, due to the fact that the blossoming of the anemone culminates at this time of the year in the area.

The anemone's blossoming season is during the Israeli winter, from December to March, and usually lives up to just one week. The flower is very common in all parts of Israel, and comes in various colors such as white, pink, purple, and blue, yet the most common one is red.

The festival is mostly based on the developing village tourism in the area, and combines agriculture with tourism. The festival offers agricultural tours, farmers' markets, and countryside lodging, as well as sports activities such as marches, race, and bike tours through the red fields of the northern Negev, and other activities such as artistic performances. The local tourism association "Shikma Besor" is responsible for the festival and its yearly activities.

The festival is held thanks to cooperation between locals and government offices (Ministry of Agriculture and Rural Development, Ministry of Tourism, Ministry for the Development of the Negev and Galilee, Ministry of Culture and Sport, Ministry of Environmental Protection) and with the funding of Keren Kayemet LeIsrael and Mifal HaPayis.

In 2024, during the Gaza War, the festival was officially canceled, though there were still some activities, with fewer visitors, in locations approved by the military. Activities included a race in support of the hostages and a march in memory of Ofir Libstein, one of the founders of the festival, who was killed defending Kibbutz Kfar Aza on October 7, 2023. In 2025, it was temporarily renamed "Darom BaLev" (Hebrew: דָרוֹם בָּלֶב, lit. 'lit. south at heart').

== See also ==
- Tourism in Israel
- Hanami
- Leaf peeping
