= Pura Nature Reserve =

Small nature reserve in Israel

Coordinates: 31°29′47″N 34°46′36″E

Pura Reserve
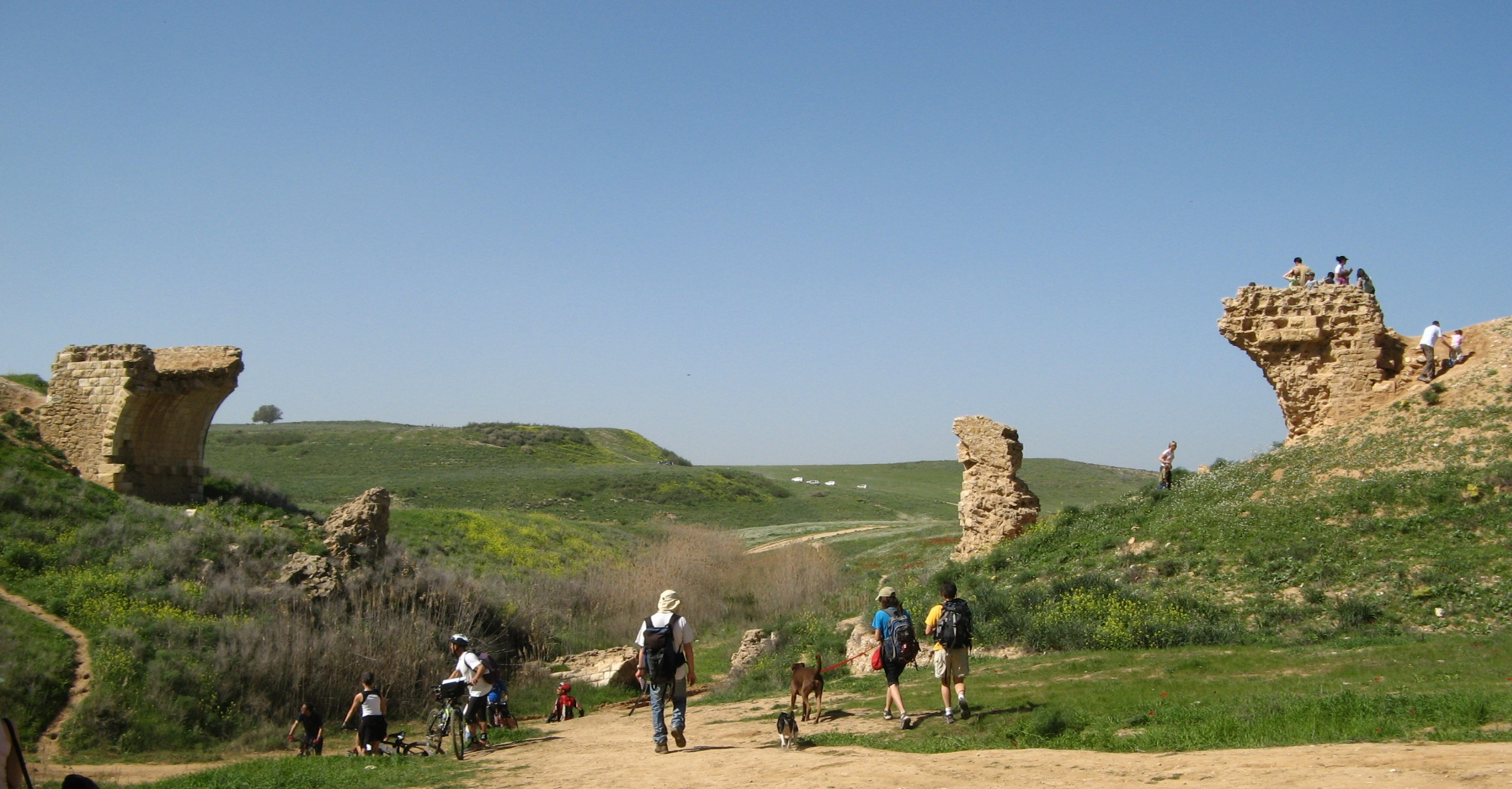
- Interactive map of Pura Reserve
- Nearest city: Kiryat Gat
- Opening: 1960s
- Administrator: Israel national parks authority

Horvat Pura Nature Reserve is a protected area located in Israel's northern Negev, near the Mahez Interchange on Road 40 (the Kiryat Gat-Beit Kama road). The reserve is celebrated for its rich and unique botanical diversity during the late winter and early spring.

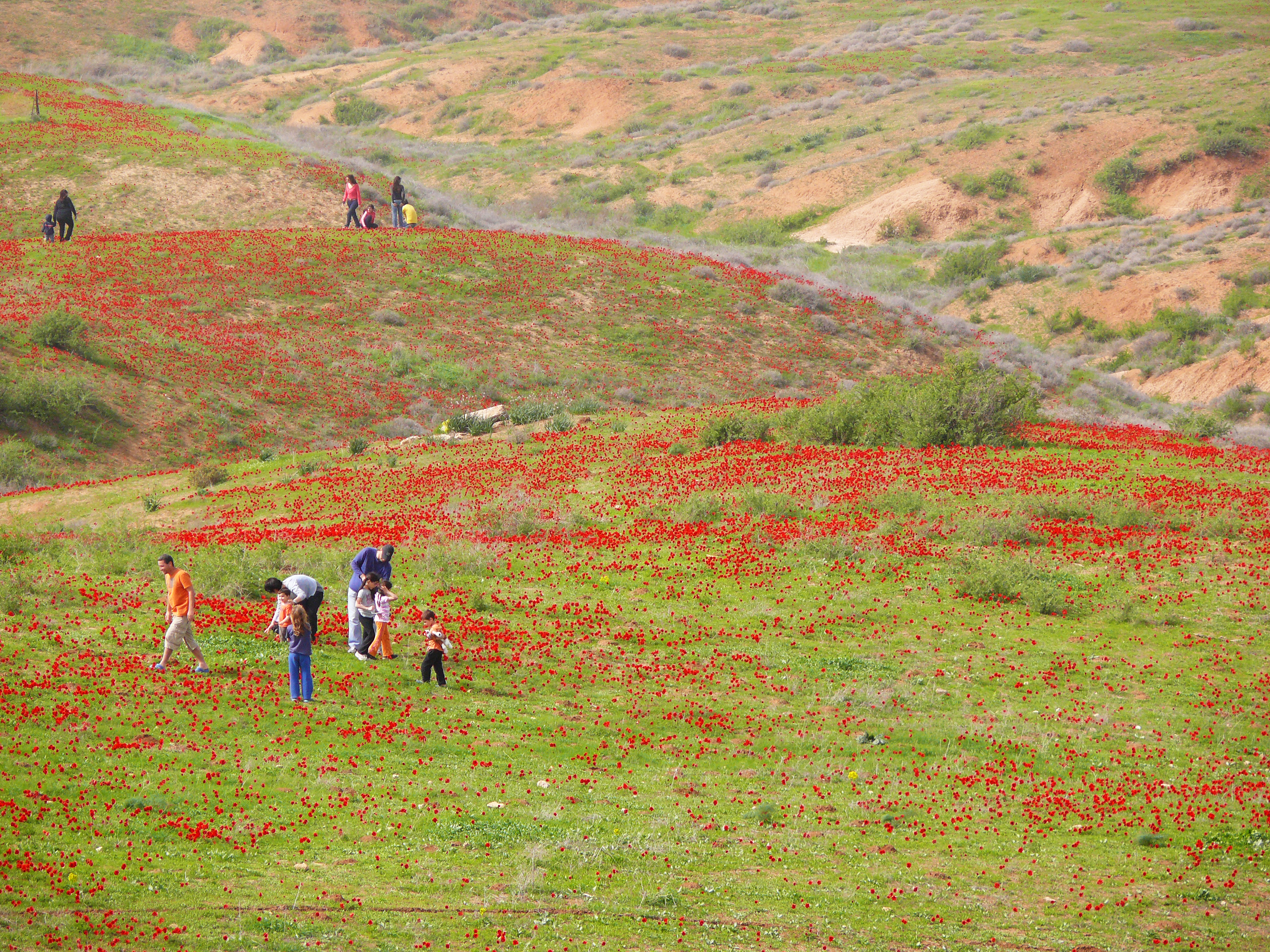
Pura natural park

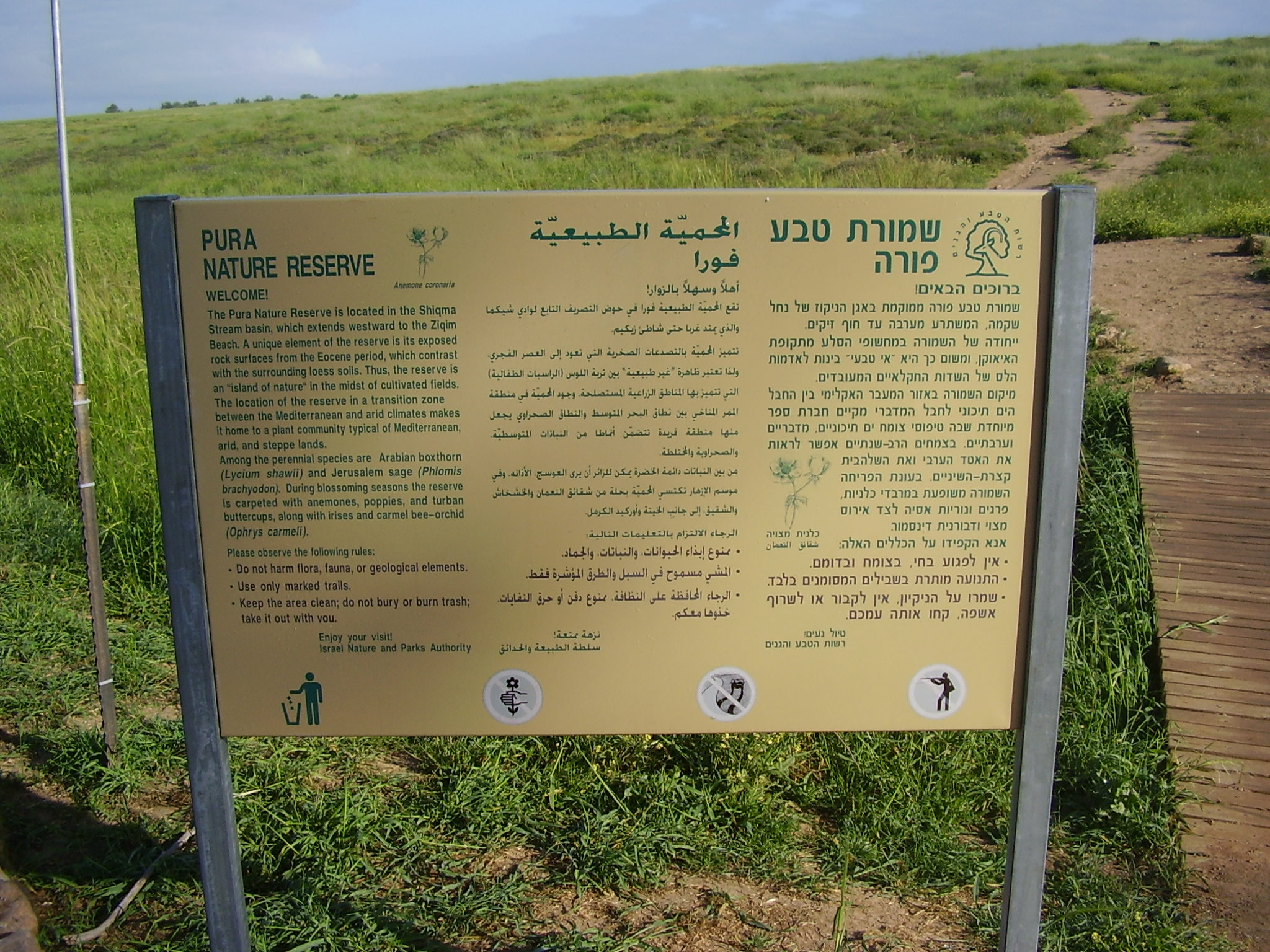

== Geography and Hydrology ==
The natural reserve originally covered an area of 12 dunams in the bed of a fertile stream, a tributary of the Shikma River. In 2007, the area of the reserve was increased by 283 dunams. The site features limestone chalk rocks dating back to the Eocene period. The reserve is named after the Pura ruin located on its western border.

The reserve is commonly known by locals and travelers as "Reserve 215" because it is situated near the 215th kilometer marker of Road 40.

In winter, floodwater is stored in the reserve with the help of a dam, and a seasonal lake is formed. The destroyed Shikma River Bridge is located in the park. This bridge is a remnant of the Turkish railway that was built during World War I from Tulkarm to Be'er Sheva, and from there to Kosima in the Sinai Peninsula. The bridge was destroyed in floods in the 1970s. In recent years, the reserve has grown to be known for its red anemone carpets, which have multiplied and expanded in the first decade of the 21st century, and is included in the Darom Adom Festival held every winter in February in the western Negev.

== Flora and Seasonality ==
The optimal time for viewing the rich botanical diversity in the reserve spans from January to April. Situated in a transition zone, the area is home to a unique mix of Mediterranean and desert flora growing on Eocene limestone chalk. Fenced off in the 1960s to protect it from overgrazing, the reserve supports a wide range of geophytes and wildflowers.

While the early part of the blooming season is completely dominated by carpets of red common anemones, later months transition into a colorful mosaic of diverse desert and Mediterranean blossoms. Other prominent species flowering in the reserve include the yellow Gymnarrhena micrantha (field rattan), the pink Helianthemum vesicarium (Shimshon Hador), and the blue Echium judaeum (Judaean viper's bugloss). The landscape is also dotted with poppies, branched asphodel, bristly oxtongue, giant fennel, wild mandrakes, Ophrys orchids, and desert scrub such as white broom (Retama), saltbush, and desert wormwood.

== Tourism and Infrastructure ==
The Israel National Trail (Shvil Yisrael) runs directly through the reserve, overlapping with the main green-marked walking path. The reserve offers two main hiking options: a short, family-friendly 2-kilometer circular trail and a longer 9-kilometer linear route that extends all the way to Tel Nagila. During the annual Darom Adom festival, the reserve functions as one of the primary focal hubs for tourists visiting the northern Negev region. Because the ecosystem is highly protected, entering the water of the seasonal reservoir is strictly prohibited. Visitors can also view the historical ruins of the Ottoman railway bridge within the reserve.

== Gallery ==
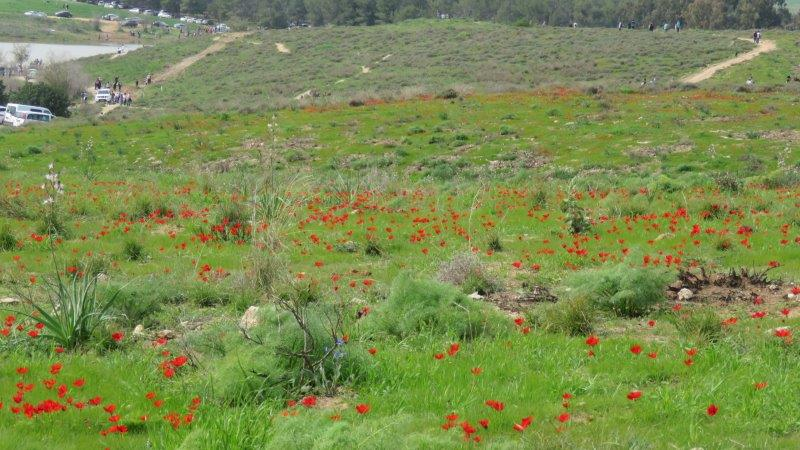

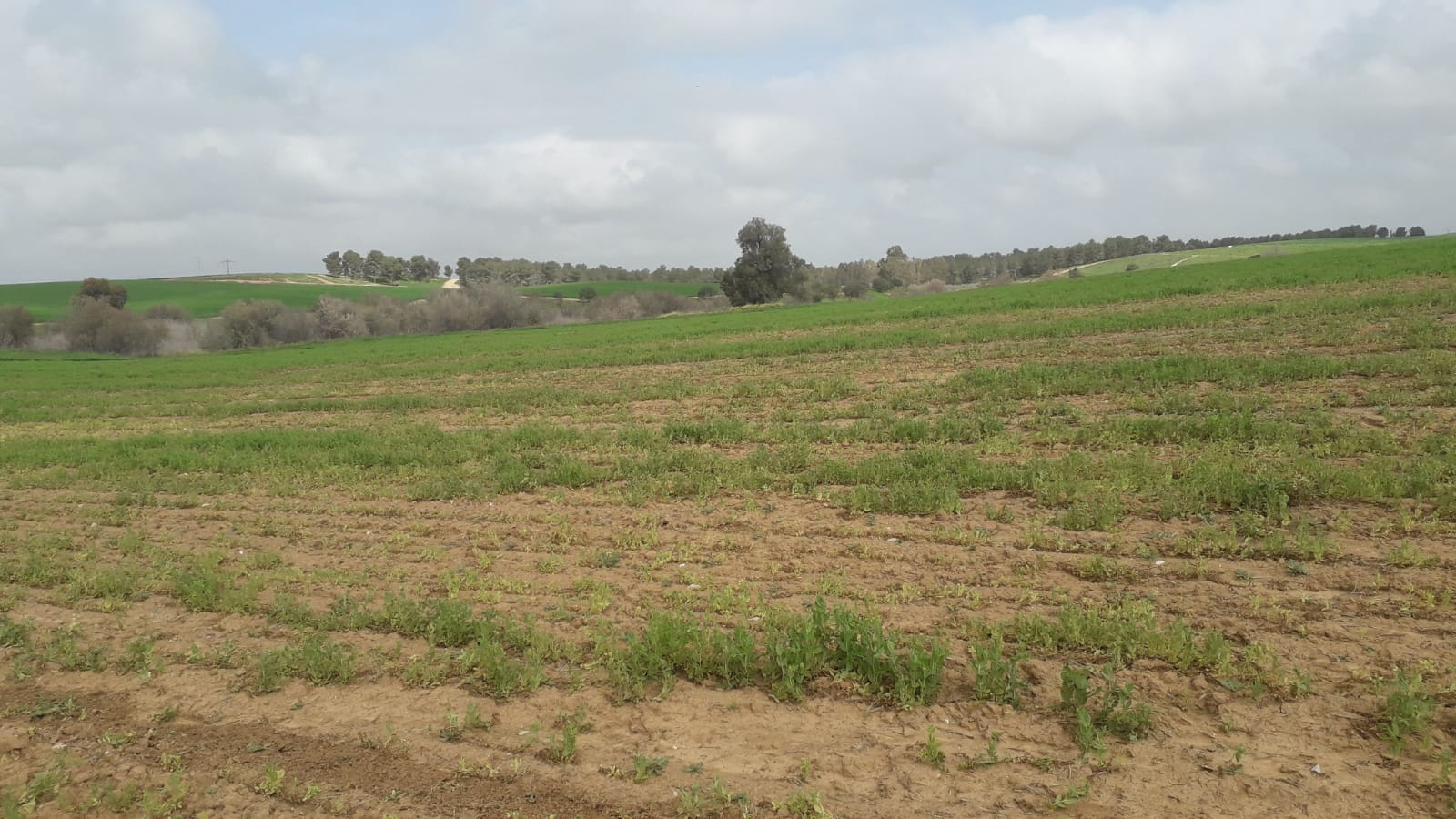

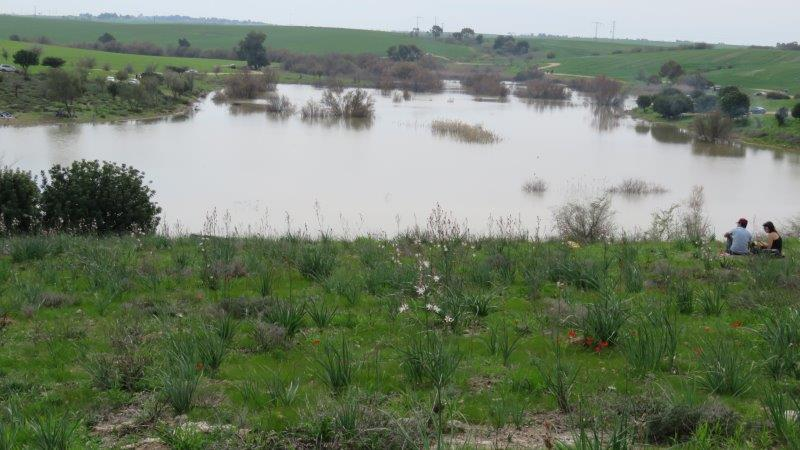

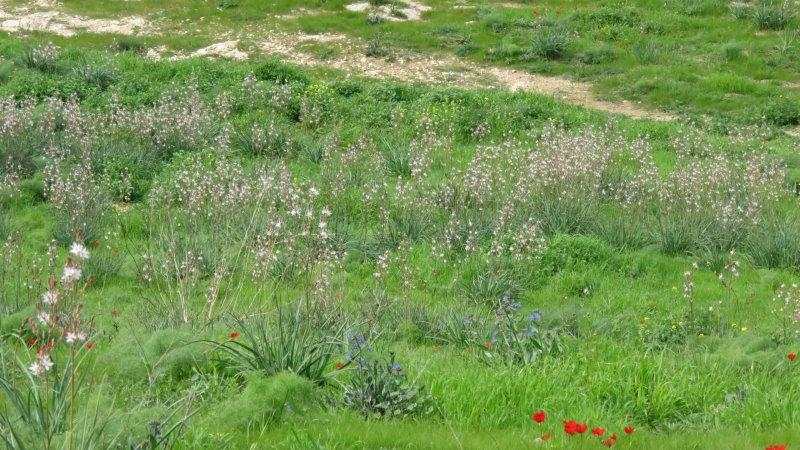
