= Derech HaTeva =

Educational organization in Israel

Derech Hateva (Hebrew: דרך הטבע, lit. Path of Nature) is an educational organization in Israel that integrates nature hikes and Jewish learning.

== History ==
Derech Hateva was founded in 2002 by Yael Ukeles, a New York native and outdoor educator. The program was created to connect Jews with Israel and to stress the connection that exists between Judaism and nature. The organization began as an outgrowth of Ukeles' earlier program, Teva Adventure and was incubated by SPNI (Society for the Protection of Nature in Israel) for its first years.

Derech Hateva is modeled after environmental programs in the United States like National Outdoor Leadership School and Outward Bound. The idea is to create educational opportunities by placing participants out in nature without modern conveniences, creating self and group reliance.

The first two summers were only open to religious Jewish teenagers. In 2007, it opened to young people from multi-denominational backgrounds in multiple sessions.

== Programs ==
The main program is the Israel Trail Teen Adventure (ITTA), a month-long hiking program covering some 215 kilometers in northern and southern Israel. The program is divided into gender-segregated groups with each group operating independently.

Elements of the program include hiking and biking in areas mentioned in the Bible along with development of outdoor living and leadership skills. Participants are taught map-reading, setting up camp and preparing meals, combined with swimming, rock-climbing and other outdoor pursuits. The participants keep kosher and observe Shabbat, exploring Judaism through relevant biblical texts on topics relating to nature.

Other programs include smaller trips and educational programming covering topics such as water conservation education and wilderness halacha (Jewish law). The Derech Hateva program goals are to integrate teaching of outdoor skills, ecology, Leave No Trace ethics and Jewish learning.

== See also ==
- Israel National Trail
- Tourism in Israel
- Jewish education
- Scouting in Israel
