= Jordan Trail =

Hiking trail in Jordan

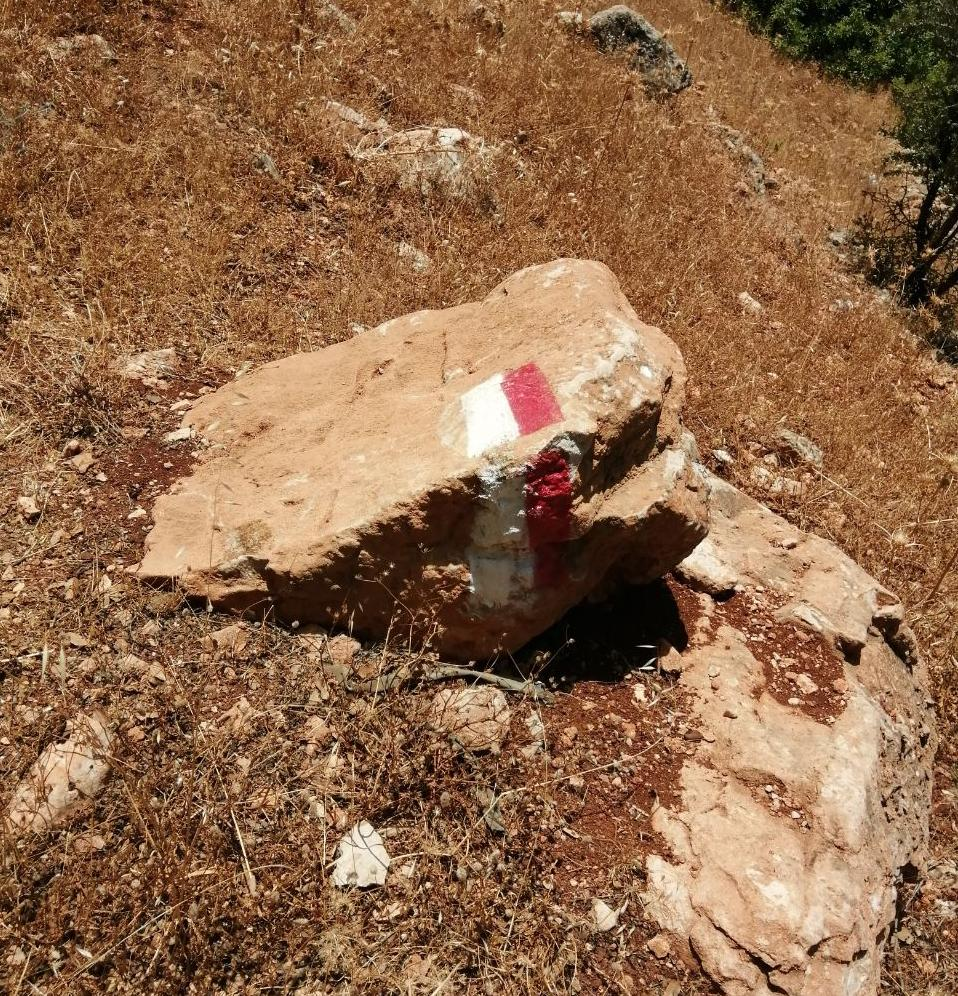
- Trail marker on the Jordan Trail.
- Length: 650 km (400 mi)
- Location: Jordan
- Established: 2015
- Trailheads: Umm Qais; Aqaba
- Use: Hiking
- Elevation change: 1,730 m (5,676 ft)
- Highest point: Wadi Rum, 1,300 m (4,265 ft) (highest point in Jordan)
- Lowest point: Dead Sea, −430 m (−1,411 ft) (lowest point on earth)
- Months: Early March to Late September
- Sights: Petra, Jerash
- Website: jordantrail.org

Trail map
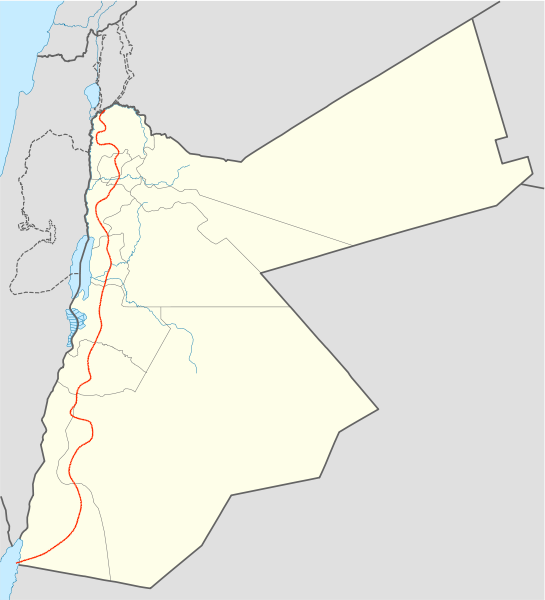
- Map of the Jordan Trail

Jordan Trail is a 650 km (400 mi) long hiking trail in Jordan established in 2015 by the Jordan Trail Association.

== History ==
The oldest trail in Jordan was an ancient trade route that is known today as the "King's Highway", which spanned from Egypt to Syria passing by Jordan. Moses, Jesus and Muhammad are believed to have walked along what is now the Jordan Trail.

The idea of a hiking trail stretching across Jordan was first introduced in the 1990s when Wadi Rum came to be seen as a hot spot for rock climbing. Tony Howard and Di taylor had completed their guidebooks to Wadi Rum and Jordan and realised the possibility of a country length trail. The idea only received momentum and funding when the Jordan Trail Association was established in 2015. Volunteers and donors from the private sector contributed to the development of Jordan's first national hiking trail. Queen Rania joined a group of travel bloggers in 2017 for a short hike.

== The Trail ==
The trail has been described as the "Inca Trail of the Middle East" by numerous travel agencies. The trail will be beneficial to Jordan's tourism sector as it begins to recover from the slump it witnessed due to regional turmoil in the early 2010s from the Arab Spring.

The trail stretches from Umm Qais in northern Jordan to the coastal city of Aqaba in its south. The trail passes through 52 villages and towns, but the trail has been dissected to 35 sections. The entire length of the trail takes around 40 days to complete.

The trail received extensive media coverage after its inception, and has been named as among 2018's best tourist destinations in the world to visit by National Geographic, the British Sunday Times, the Guardian, Condenast, Vogue US and Lonely Planet.

== See also ==
- Israel National Trail
