= Sea to Sea Hiking Trail =

Long distance Hiking path crossing the north of Israel

Sea To Sea Hiking Trail
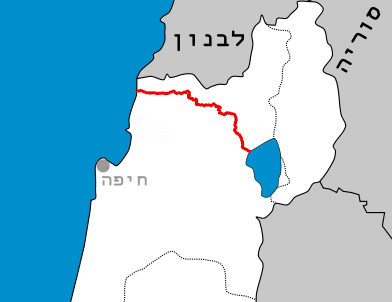
- Length: 70 kilometres (43.5 mi)
- Location: Northern District, Israel
- Trailheads: West: Achziv, East: Sea of Galilee
- Use: Hiking
- Elevation gain/loss: 1.56 km gain, 1.77 km loss
- Highest point: 1,200 m (3,900 ft)
- Lowest point: −200 m (−660 ft)
- Difficulty: Medium
- Season: Fall and spring

The Sea to Sea Hiking Trail (Hebrew: שביל מים לים, Shvil MiYam LeYam) is a long-distance hiking trail that crosses the north of Israel, its western end on the coast of the Mediterranean Sea at Achziv National Park near the Lebanese border in the far north of the country, extending eastward to the coast of the Sea of Gallilee near Kibbutz Ginosar, with a total length of about 70 km (43 mi). When hiked from west to east the total elevation gain and loss are about 1.56 km and 1.77 km respectively. The trail is marked with different colors in different sections but is accompanied by purple circles throughout the trail. It takes an average of 3–5 days to complete.

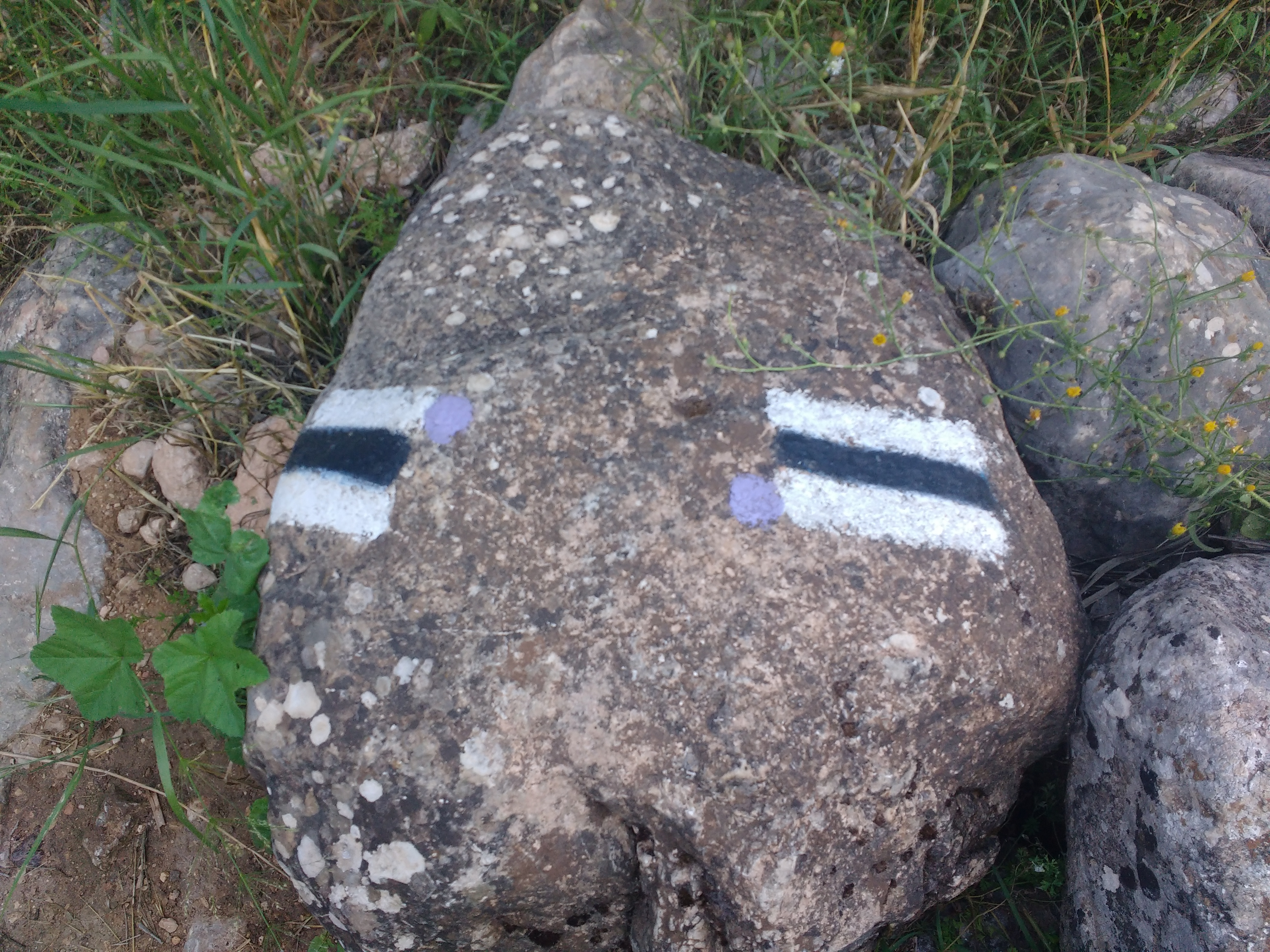
Typical marker on the sea to sea trail. The color of the marking changes along the track, but a purple circle accompanies it throughout.

The trail traverses three nature reserves: Nahal Kziv nature reserve, Meron nature reserve and Nahal Amud nature reserve. The trail boasts abundant fauna and flora, winding its way close to numerous springs and archeological sites.

== Itinerary ==
Most hikers would complete the trail in four days, walking the west to the east. Camping is not allowed in nature reserves, limiting the number of possible itineraries. The following is a popular four day itinerary.

- Day 1: From the Mediterranean Sea at Achziv, to Abirim, through Nahal Kziv. About 19 kilometres (11.8 mi). The trail passes near several springs: Ein Hardalit, Ein Ziv and Ein Tamir. A slight deviation from the trail up the slopes of the southern ridge is the impressive Montfort Castle - a ruined Crusader castle built in the 13th century. Metzad Abirim is a massive stone structure, almost hidden in the forest, few hundred meters near the end of the first day's trail. It is not known whether it served as a military fort from the Crusader period or a fortified agricultural farm from the Roman or Byzantine period.
- Day 2: From Abirim to Hamama ruins (Hebrew: חרבת חממה), near Mount Meron, through Nahal Kziv and Nahal Moran. About 18 kilometres (11.2 mi). The trail passes the impressive ruins of Morgoth, a Byzantyne settlement. After Elkosh junction, the trail enters the Meron nature reserve traversing the waterfall of Ein Retet and Ein Hotam, a spring that flows into an ancient stone building. The site is sacred to the Druze of the nearby town Hurfeish - and therefore it is forbidden to dip in it. The last section of the third day passes Nahal Neria, abundant in red bark plane trees.
- Day 3: From Hamama ruins to Ein Koves, near Safed, through Nahal Meron and Nahal Amud. About 18 kilometres (11.2 mi). At the summit of mount Meron a wide view opens up to the mountains of the Upper Galilee and Lebanon, the Golan Heights and Hermon as well as the coastal plain. The Hota cave is a 157 meters deep vertical cave, considered the second deepest cave in Israel. The path leads down a little steeply, through a tall and impressive stone pillar known as "Elija's Chair", to the ruins of Shema - the remains of an ancient Talmudic city with a mausoleum and a synagogue.
- Day 4: Ein Koves to the Sea of Galilee through Nahal Amud. About 16 kilometres (9.9 mi). This first 6 kilometres (3.7 mi) of this section are the most demanding of the trek necessitating frequent utilization of ladders, pegs, and handholds. In the lower parts of the river, steep cliffs flanking both sides are home to large caves within which prehistoric findings of great importance have been discovered. Finally, one meets the famous 20-meter pilar, known as "Amud" in Hebrew, that gave the river its name.

On days 3 and 4 the route aligns almost entirely with a segment of the Israel National Trail.

== Youth organization tradition ==
The sea to sea trail, although is a slightly different route, was very popular among youth organizations in the 1950s and 60s. The journey was designed to toughen the participants and included carrying all the necessary food and equipment. The Hebrew Scouts Movement in Israel has been organizing the Sea to Sea hike every year during the Passover holidays, for 14 years old Scouts since 1919.

== See also ==
- Tourism in Israel
- Archaeology of Israel
- Geography of Israel
- List of long-distance footpaths
- Wildlife in Israel
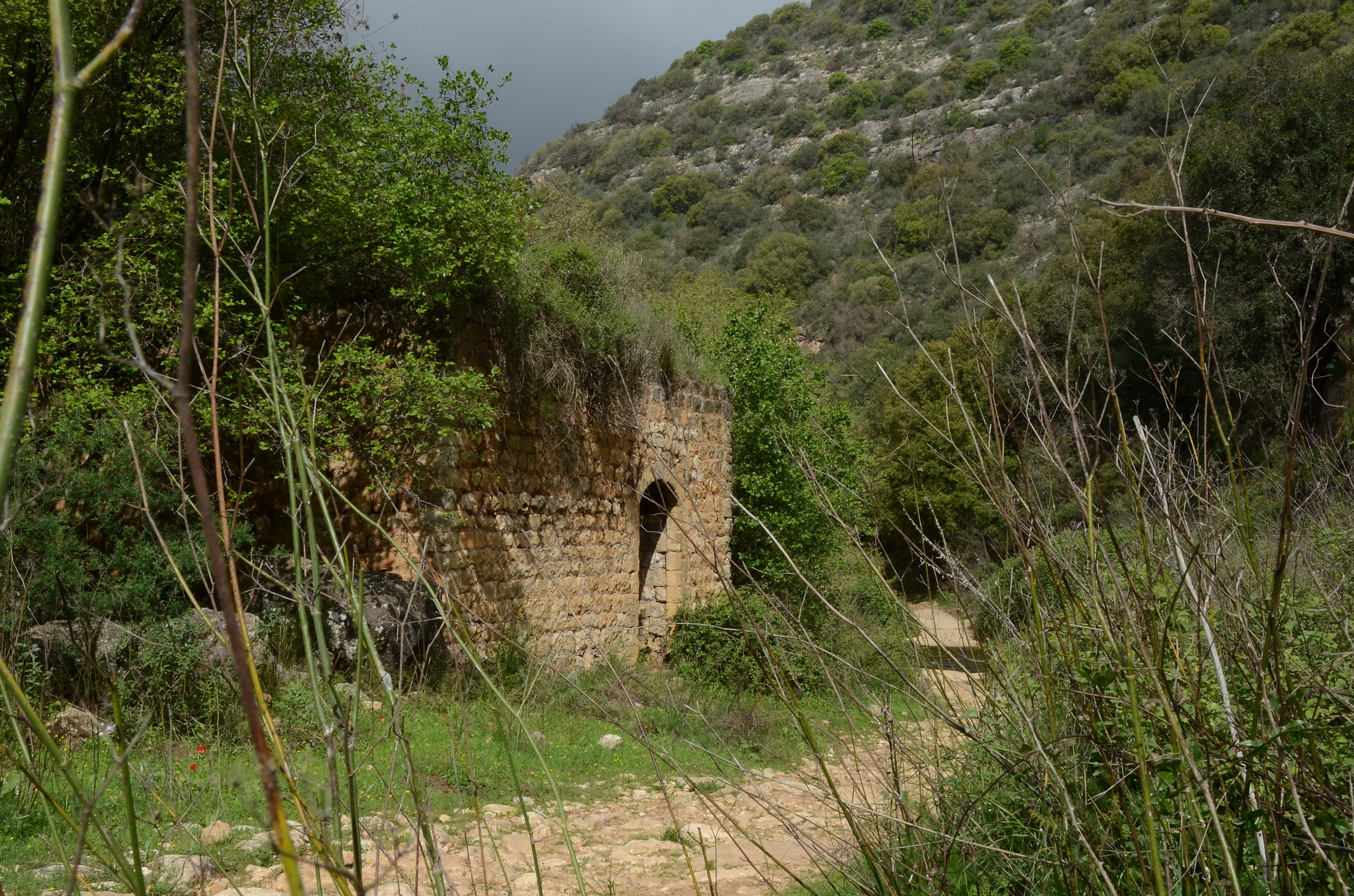
Old mill in Kziv river

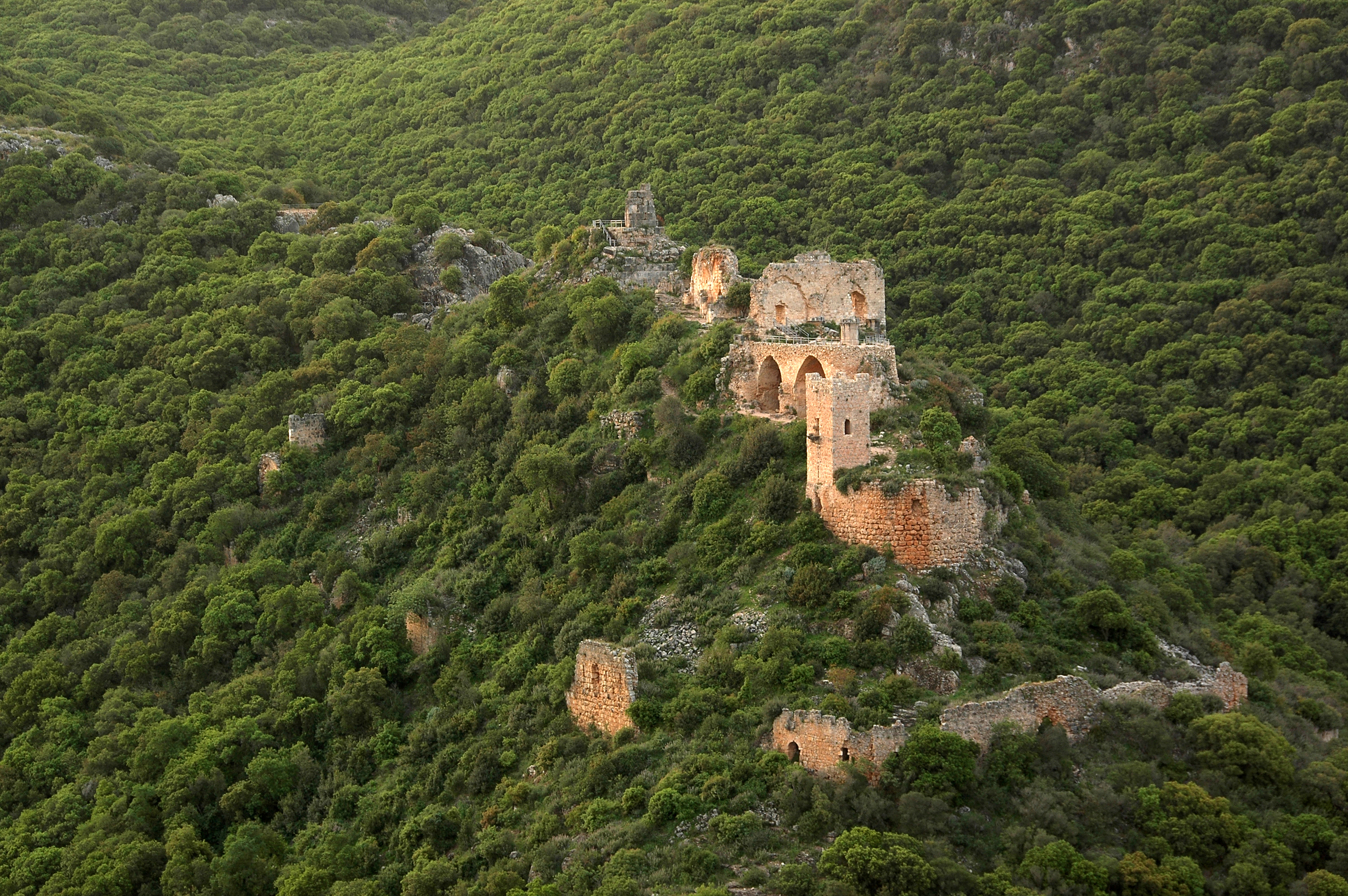
Montfort fortress above Kziv river

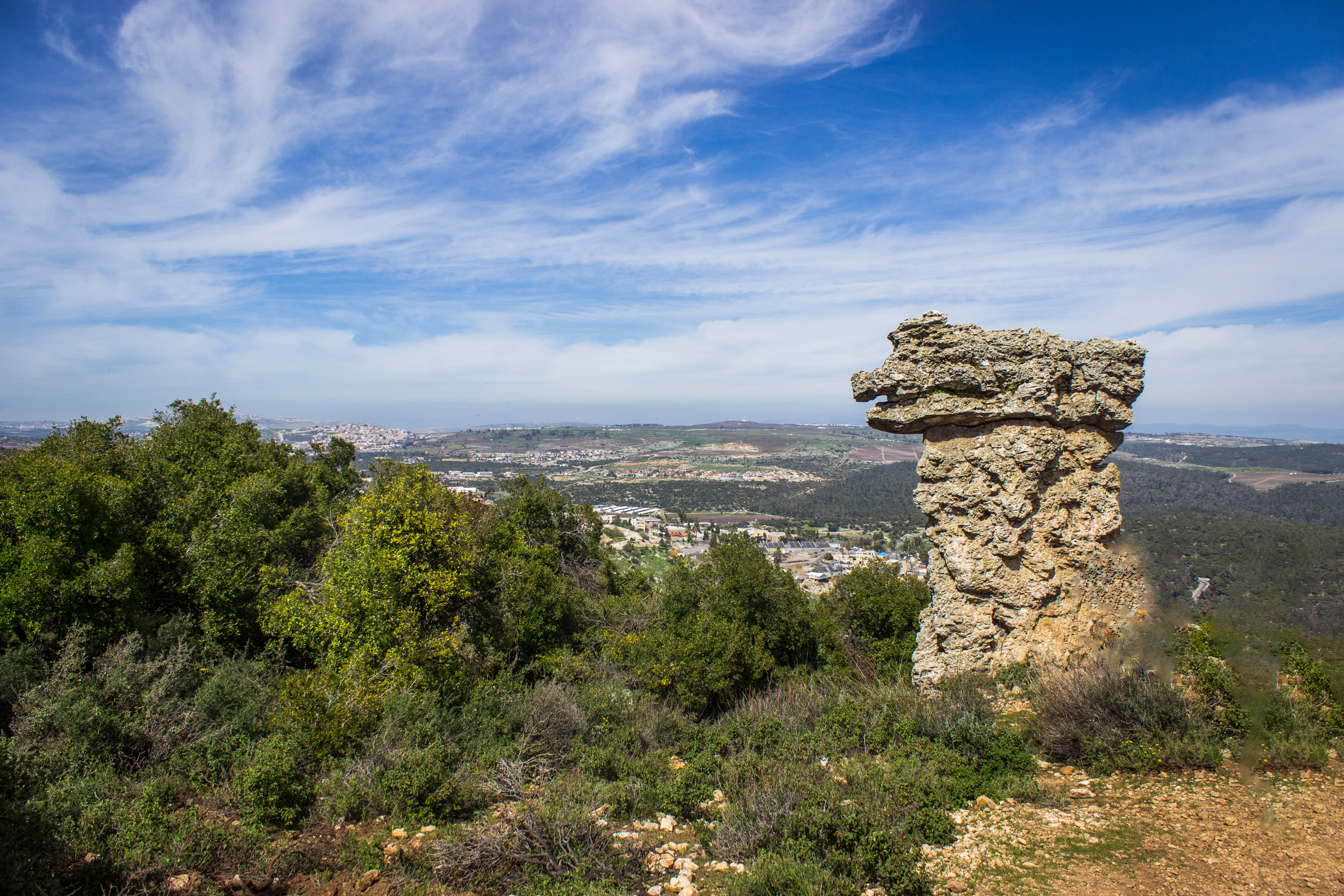
Elija's chair - Miron mountain

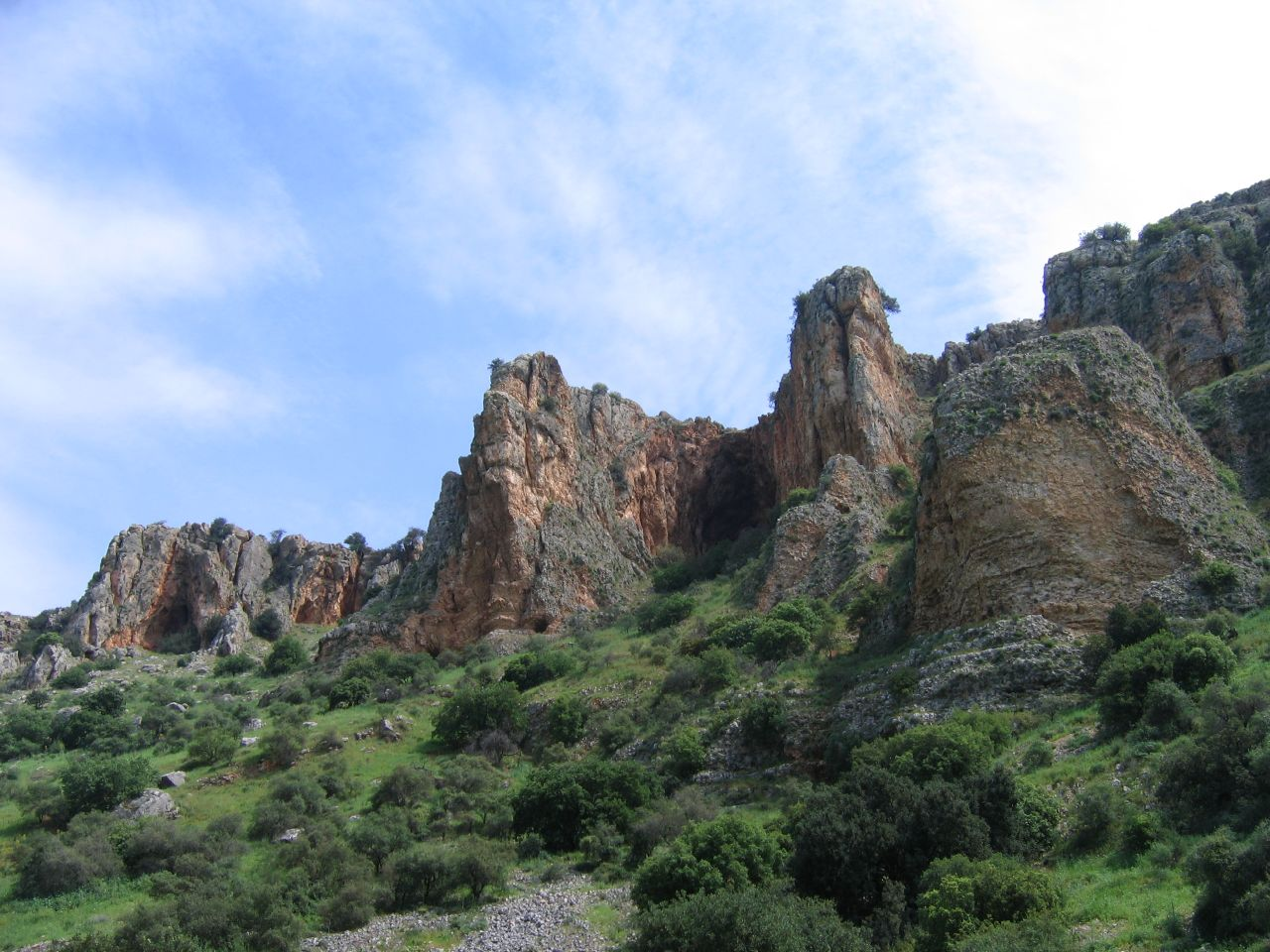
Amud river cliffs
