= Mount Timna =

Mountain in Israel

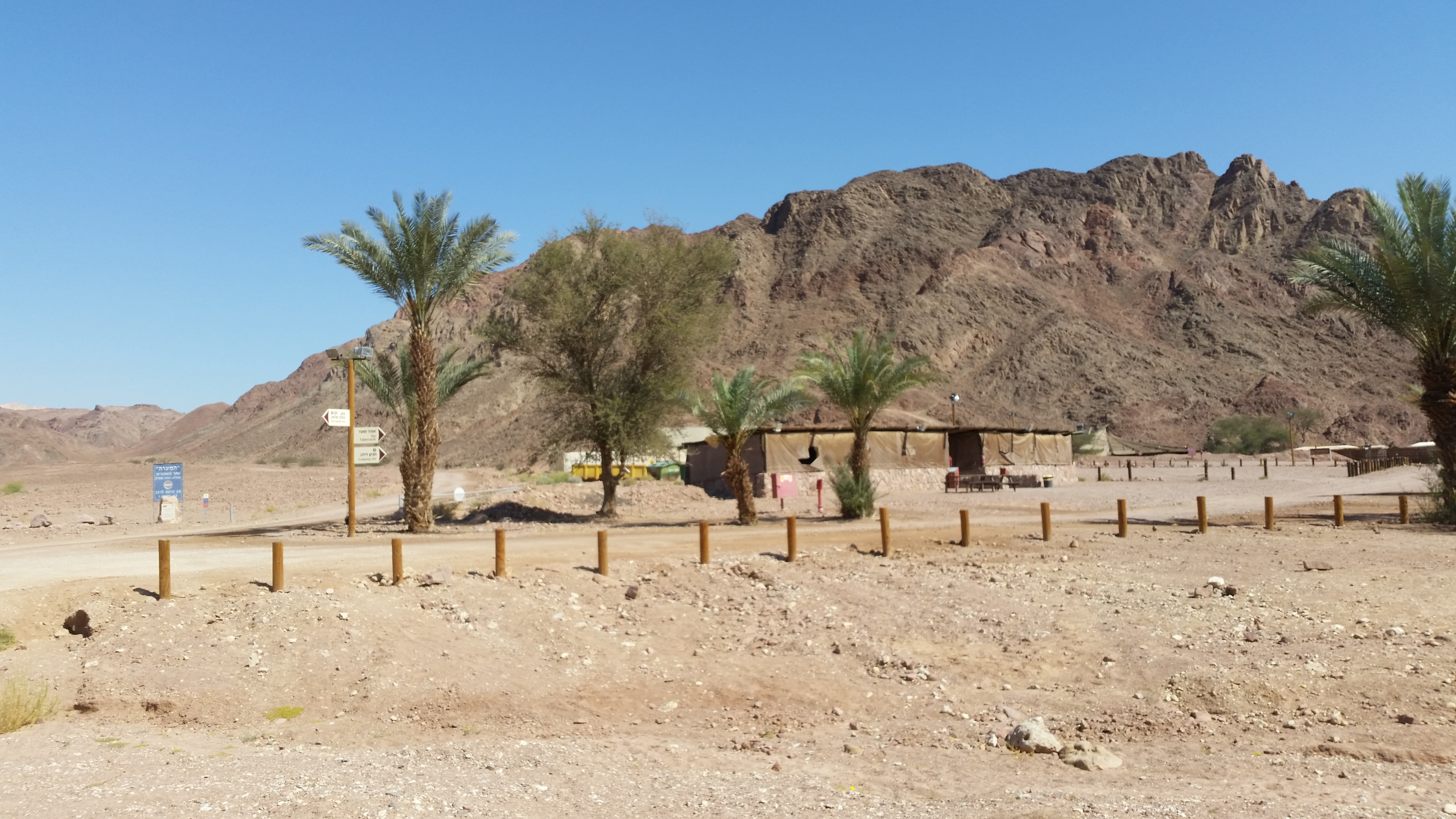

Highest point
- Coordinates: 29°46′49″N 34°58′12″E

Geography

Mount Timna (Arabic: جَبَل تمنَع, Hebrew: הר תמנע) is located in the Eilat Mountains, in the south of the "Arava" about 1.5 km from the entrance to Timna Park. The mountain is the site of ancient copper mines, and has a much studied and unique geological formation
