= Negev Bedouin =

Nomadic Arab Muslim tribes residing in the Negev desert in Israel

Negev Bedouin بدو النقب הבדואים בנגב
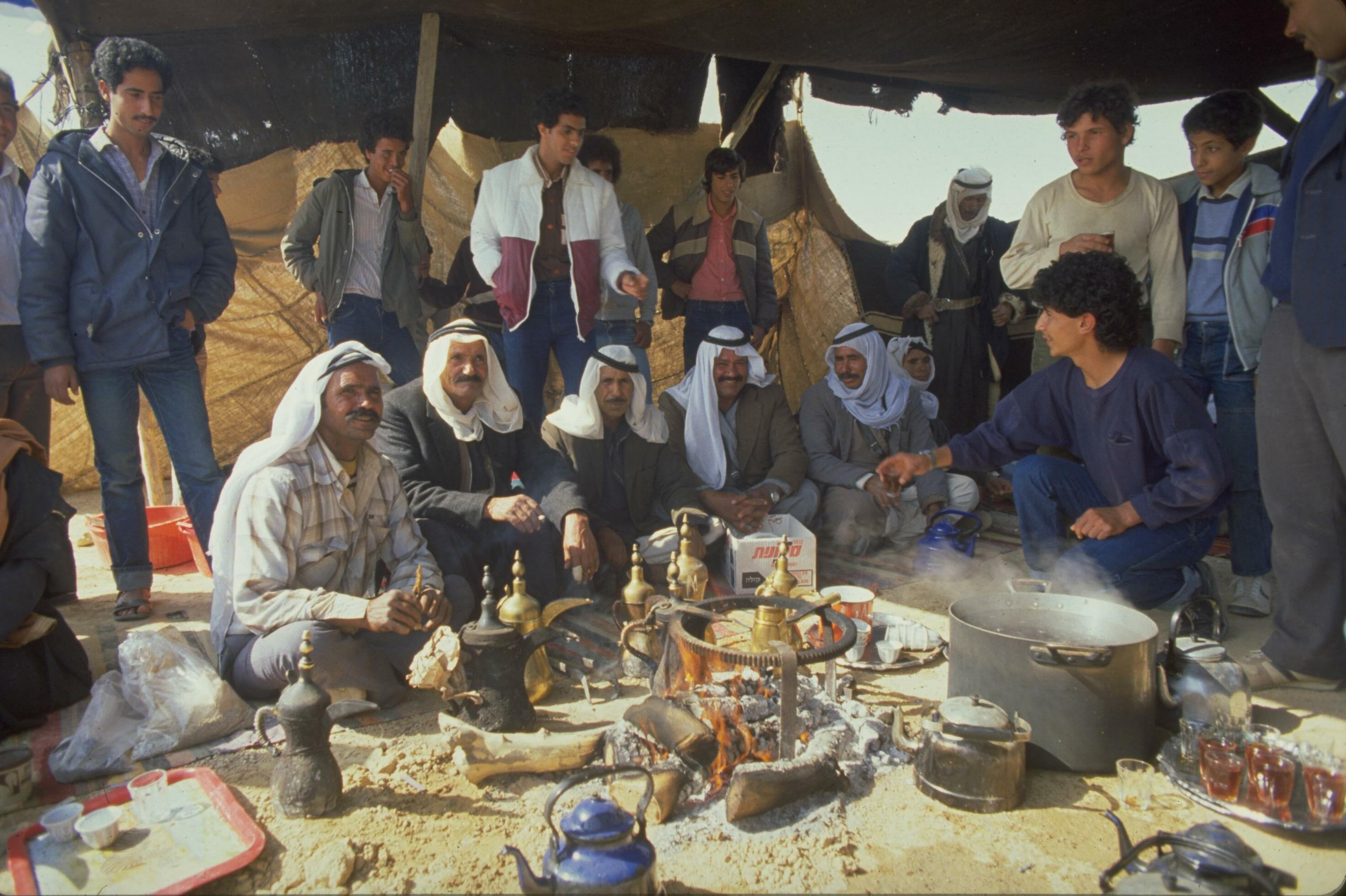
- Bedouin men at a party

Total population
- Over 200,000

Regions with significant populations
- Israel: 200,000–210,000
- Palestine: 45,000

Languages
- Native language: Arabic (mainly Bedouin dialect, also Egyptian), Secondary language: Hebrew (Modern Israeli)

Religion
- Islam

Related ethnic groups
- Other Bedouin

The Negev Bedouin (Arabic: بدْو النقب, Badwu an-Naqab; Hebrew: הבדואים בנגב, HaBedu'im BaNegev) are traditionally pastoral nomadic Arab tribes (Bedouin), who until the later part of the 19th century would wander between Hijaz in the east and the Sinai Peninsula in the west. Today most live in the Negev region of Israel, while a minority who were expelled during the 1948 war live in Palestine. The Bedouin tribes adhere to Islam and most are Israeli citizens forming part of the Israeli Bedouin. Some Bedouins voluntarily serve in the Israel Defense Forces.

From 1858 during Ottoman rule, the Negev Bedouin underwent a process of sedentarization which accelerated after the founding of Israel. In the 1948 Arab–Israeli War, most resettled in neighboring countries. With time, some started returning to Israel and about 11,000 were recognized by Israel as its citizens by 1954. Between 1968 and 1989, Israel built seven townships in the northeast Negev for this population, including Rahat, Hura, Tel as-Sabi, Ar'arat an-Naqab, Lakiya, Kuseife and Shaqib al-Salam.

Others settled outside these townships in what are called the unrecognized villages. In 2003, in an attempt to settle the land disputes in the Negev, the Israeli government offered to retroactively recognize eleven villages (Abu Qrenat, Umm Batin, al-Sayyid, Bir Hadaj, Drijat, Mulada, Makhul, Qasr al-Sir, Kukhleh, Abu Talul and Tirabin al-Sana), but also increased enforcement against "illegal construction". Bedouin land owners refused to accept the offer and the land disputes still stood. The majority of the unrecognized villages were therefore slated for bulldozing under the Prawer Plan, which would have dispossessed 30,000-40,000 Bedouins. After large protests by Bedouins and severe criticism from human rights organizations, the Prawer plan was rescinded in December 2013.

The Bedouin population in the Negev numbers 200,000–210,000. Just over half of them live in the seven government-built Bedouin-only towns; the remaining 90,000 live in 46 villages – 35 of which are still unrecognized and 11 of which were officially recognized in 2003.

== Characteristics ==
The Negev Bedouin are Arabs who originally had a nomadic lifestyle rearing livestock in the deserts of the Negev. The community is traditional and conservative, with a well-defined value system that directs and monitors behavior and interpersonal relations.

The Negev Bedouin tribes have been divided into three classes, according to their origin: descendants of ancient Arabian nomads, descendants of some Sinai Bedouin tribes, and Palestinian peasants (Fellaheen) who came from cultivated areas. Al-Tarabin tribe is the largest tribe in the Negev and the Sinai Peninsula, Al-Tarabin along with Al-Tayaha, and Al-Azazma are the largest tribes in the Negev.

Counter to the image of the Bedouin as fierce stateless nomads roving the entire region, by the turn of the 20th century, much of the Bedouin population in Palestine was settled, semi-nomadic, and engaged in agriculture according to an intricate system of land ownership, grazing rights, and water access.

Today, many Bedouin call themselves 'Negev Arabs' rather than 'Bedouin', explaining that 'Bedouin' identity is intimately tied in with a pastoral nomadic way of life – a way of life they say is over. Although the Bedouin in Israel continue to be perceived as nomads, today all of them are fully sedentarized, and about half are urbanites.

Nevertheless, Negev Bedouin continue to possess sheep and goats: In 2000 the Ministry of Agriculture estimated that the Negev Bedouin owned 200,000 head of sheep and 5,000 of goats, while Bedouin estimates referred to 230,000 sheep and 20,000 goats.

== History ==
=== Antiquity ===
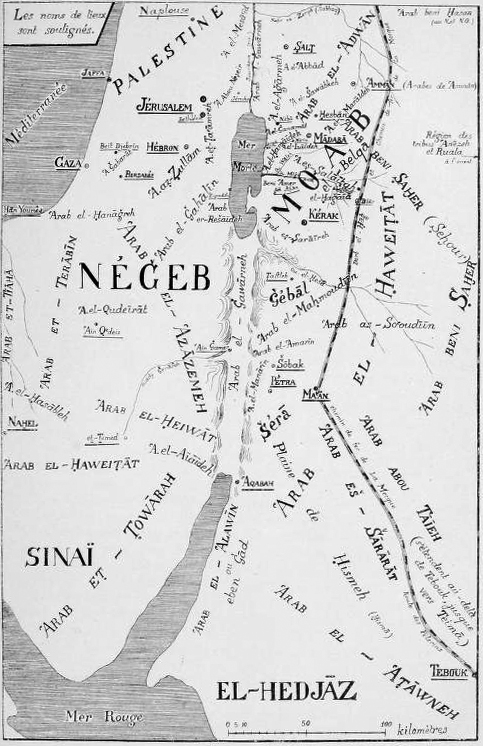
1908 map of the Bedouin tribes

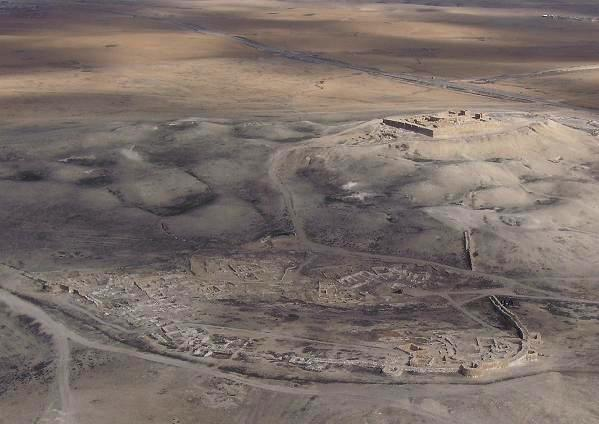
Tel Arad inhabited since 4000 BCE

Historically, the Bedouin engaged in nomadic herding, agriculture and sometimes fishing. They also earned income by transporting goods and people across the desert. Scarcity of water and of permanent pastoral land required them to move constantly. The first recorded nomadic settlement in Sinai dates back 4,000-7,000 years. The Bedouin of the Sinai Peninsula migrated to and from the Negev.

The Bedouin established very few permanent settlements; however, some evidence remains of traditional baika buildings, seasonal dwellings for the rainy season when they would stop to engage in farming. Cemeteries known as "nawamis" dating to the late fourth millennium B.C. have been also found. Similarly, open-air mosques (without a roof) dating from the early Islamic period are common and still in use. The Bedouin conducted extensive farming on plots scattered throughout the Negev.

During the 6th century, Emperor Justinian sent Wallachian soldiers to the Sinai to build Saint Catherine's Monastery. Over time these soldiers converted to Islam, and adopted an Arab Bedouin lifestyle.

=== Islamic era ===
In the 7th century, the Levant was conquered by the Rashidun Caliphate. Later, the Umayyad dynasty began sponsoring building programs throughout the region, which was in close proximity to the dynastic capital in Damascus, and the Bedouin flourished. However, this activity decreased after the capital was moved to Baghdad during the subsequent Abbasid reign.

=== Ottoman Empire ===
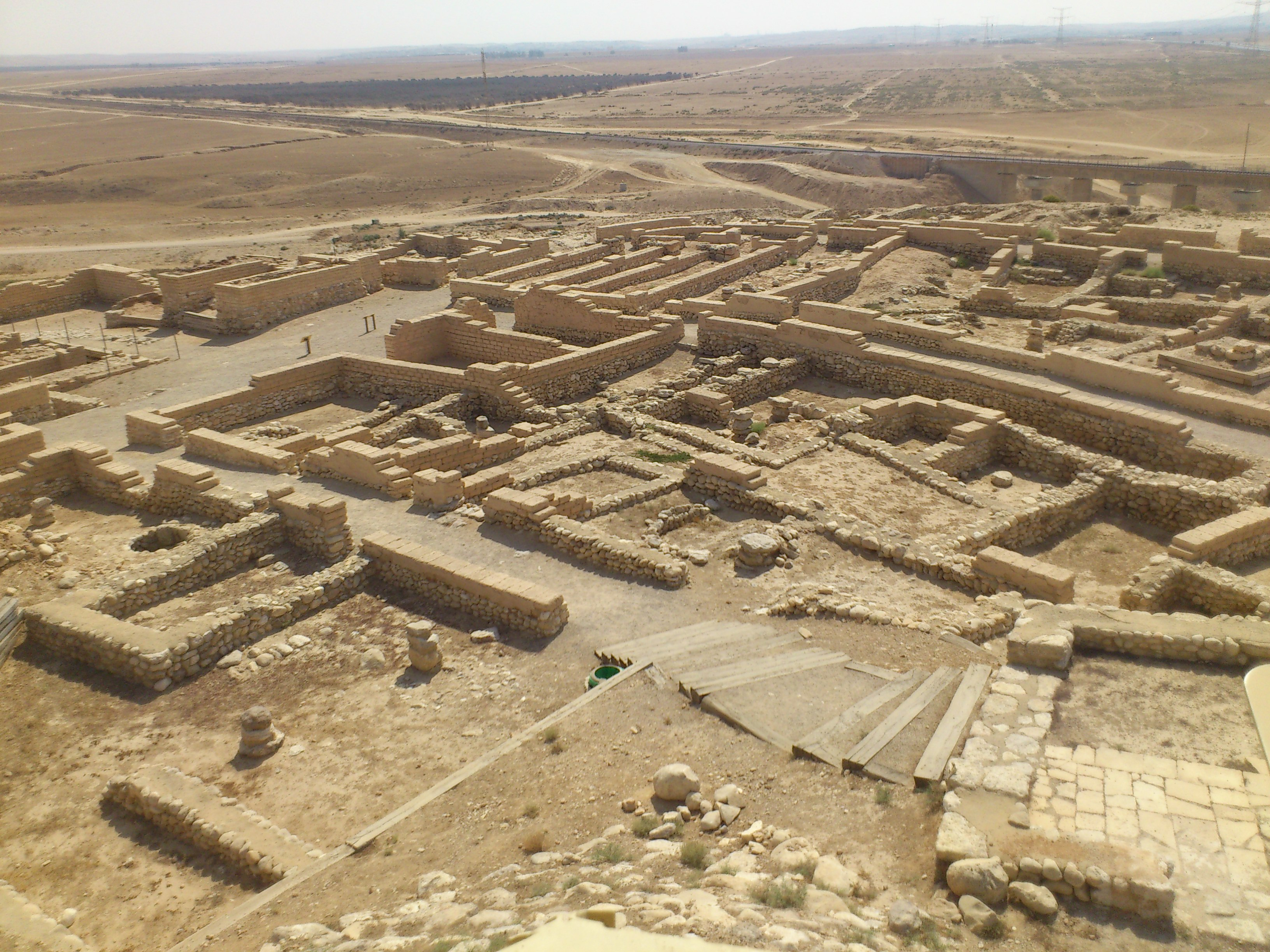
Tal Al-Sba' inhabited since 1100 BCE

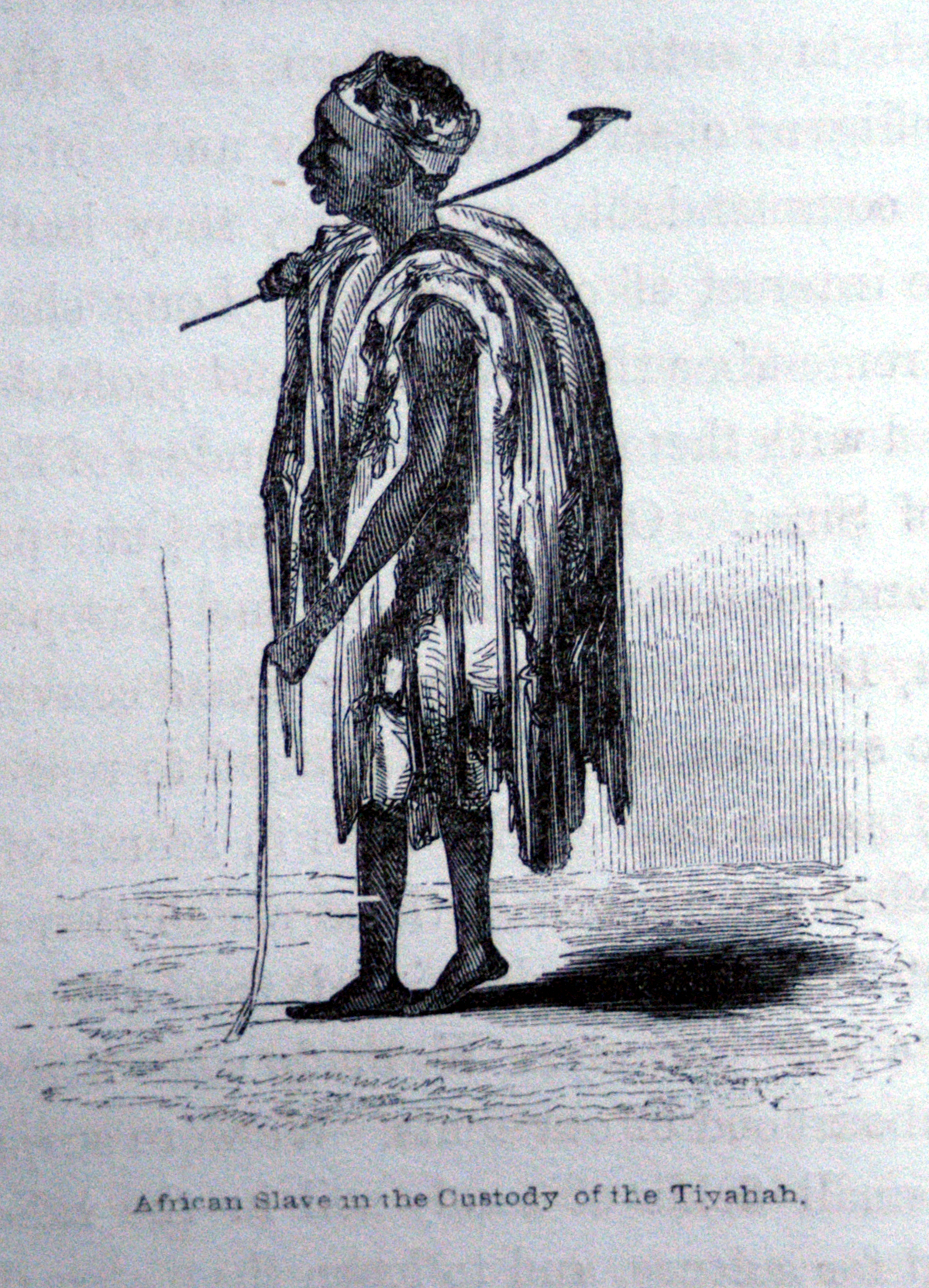
African slave belonging to Tiyaha bedouin, 1847

Most of the Negev Bedouin tribes migrated to the Negev from the Arabian Desert, Transjordan, Egypt, and the Sinai from the 18th century onwards. Traditional Bedouin lifestyle began to change after the French invasion of Egypt in 1798. The rise of the puritanical Wahhabi sect forced them to reduce their raiding of caravans. Instead, the Bedouin acquired a monopoly on guiding pilgrim caravans to Mecca, as well as selling them provisions. The opening of the Suez canal reduced the dependence on desert caravans and attracted the Bedouin to newly formed settlements that sprung up along the canal.

Bedouin sedentarization began under Ottoman rule, as the Ottoman Empire needed to establish law and order in the Negev and viewed the Bedouins as a threat to the state's control. In 1858, the Ottoman Land Code of 1858 was issued as part of the Tanzimat reforms to modernize the Ottoman state. This code instituted an unprecedented land registration process which was also meant to boost the empire's tax base, and also in reality offered the legal grounds for the displacement of the Bedouin. Few Bedouin opted to register their lands with the Ottoman Tapu, due to lack of enforcement by the Ottomans, illiteracy, refusal to pay taxes and lack of relevance of written documentation of ownership to the Bedouin way of life at that time.

At the end of the 19th century Sultan Abdul Hamid II (Abdülhamid II) undertook other measures in order to control the Bedouin. As a part of this policy he settled loyal Muslim populations from the Balkan and Caucasus (Circassians) among the areas predominantly populated by the nomads, and also created several permanent Bedouin settlements, although the majority of them did not remain. In 1900 an urban administrative center of Beersheva was established in order to extend governmental control over the area.

Another measure initiated by the Ottoman authorities was the private acquisition of large plots of state land offered by the sultan to the absentee landowners (effendis). Numerous tenants were brought in order to cultivate the newly acquired lands.

And the main trend of settling non-Bedouin population in the Palestine remained until the last days of the empire. By the 20th century much of the Bedouin population was settled, semi-nomadic, and engaged in agriculture according to an intricate system of land ownership, grazing rights, and water access.

During World War I, the Negev Bedouin fought with the Turks against the British, but later withdrew from the conflict. Sheikh Hamad Pasha al-Sufi (died 1923), Sheikh of the Nijmat sub-tribe of the Tarabin, led a force of 1,500 men from Al-Tarabin, Al-Tayaha, Al-Azazma tribes which joined the Turkish offensive against the Suez Canal.

=== British Mandate ===
The British Mandate in Palestine brought order to the Negev; however, this order was accompanied by losses in sources of income and poverty among the Bedouin. The Bedouin nevertheless retained their lifestyle, and a 1927 report describes them as the "untamed denizens of the Arabian deserts." The British also established the first formal schools for the Bedouin.

The Negev Bedouin have been described as remaining largely unaffected by changes in the outside world until recently. Their society was often considered a "world without time." Recent scholars have challenged the notion of the Bedouin as 'fossilized,' or 'stagnant' reflections of an unchanging desert culture. Emanuel Marx has shown that Bedouin were engaged in a constantly dynamic reciprocal relation with urban centers and Michael Meeker, a cultural anthropologist, states that "the city was to be found in their midst."

The British Mandate authorities, laws and bureaucracy favored settled groups above pastoral nomads and they found it hard to fit the Negev Bedouin into their system of governance, thus the Mandate's policy regarding the Bedouin tribes of Palestine was often of an ad hoc nature.

But eventually, as had happened with the Ottoman authorities, the British turned to coercion. Several regulations were issued, such as the Bedouin Control Ordinance (1942), meant to provide the administration with "special powers of control of nomadic or semi-nomadic tribes with the object of persuading them towards a more settled way of life". The ample powers of the Ordinance empowered the District Commissioner to direct the Bedouin "to go to, or not go to, or to remain in any specified area".

Mandatory land policies created legal and demographic pressures for sedentarization, and by the end of the British Mandate the majority of the Bedouin were settled. They built some 60 new villages and dispersed settlements, populated by 27,500 people in 1945, according to the Mandate authorities. The only exception were the Negev Bedouin who remained semi-nomadic.

Prior to the founding of Israel, the Negev's population consisted almost entirely of 110,000 Bedouin.

Compared to rural Arabs, Bedouins were more willing to accept and sell land to Jews but outbreaks of violence and having different views on land ownership created a complicated relationship. The Bedouins expected payment for land, and labor as well as the development of water sources in the region and to learn science and technology from the Jews. The relations also varied between tribal groups with tense relations between Jews and the Azazma around Bir Asluj and Revivim compared to warm relations with the Tarabin in western Negev. In addition to payments in exchange for the purchase of lands and of salaries to field guards, Bedouin sheikhs were paid protection money, a part of which was paid in water. Initially Jews relied on well water from the Bedouins but later the settlers began drilling for water which impressed Bedouins who offered water to Jewish settlements expecting more water from Jews in the future. In return some Jewish settlements such as Revivim constructed special taps for travelling Bedouins.

In 1932 Mufti Haj Amin el Husseini visited Wadi al-Shariya and was hosted by Sheikh Ibrahim el-Sana who with other sheikhs agreed to counter Negev from the Zionist settlement. They agreed to stop selling land to Jews and to consider those that do as outcasts. However the implementation of the agreement was varied across groups with some ignoring it.

A Bedouin family near the gate of kibbutz Urim, 1946

By 1947 Jews had begun building pipelines in cooperation with Arabs and Bedouin villages who were promised their own taps. However this also increased conflict between Jews and hostile Bedouin tribes who damaged the pipelines. On 9 December 1947 a platoon of Jewish guards from Palmach encountered a Bedouin camp near kibbutz Mivtachim and violence ensued and was followed by several incidents of violence between Jewish patrols and Bedouins.

=== 1948 Palestine war ===
Bedouins' forced transfer during the last century

During the 1948 Palestine war, Negev Bedouin supported both Jewish and Arab sides of the conflict. Some Bedouin groups aided Jewish populations against the Palestinian National Movement and Arab armies, particularly after the United Nations' Partition Plan of 1947. Conversely, other Bedouin groups aligned with the Palestinian National Movement fighting against the Jewish population. This period saw the formation of fighting Bedouin societies that participated in conflicts throughout the country, including the Galilee region, with Bedouin tribes fighting on both sides. In the Galilee, most Bedouins identified with the Arab population, however, there were also Bedouins who had defended Jewish security before the establishment of the State of Israel often risking their lives and property by aligning with the Jewish fighters. The first Bedouin tribe to align themselves to help the Jews was Arab-al-Hib and later became the tracker unit in the Israel Defence Forces.

After the war, some Bedouins who were neutral or fought with the Zionist forces remained in the State of Israel. Others were forced to leave. The IDF prevented some tribes, including some known to be neutral or friendly towards the Jews, from reaping their crops. The crops were either burned or reaped by Jews. Most of them fled or were expelled to Jordan, the Sinai Peninsula, the Gaza Strip, and the West Bank. In March 1948, Bedouin and semi-Bedouin communities begun to leave their homes and encampments in response to Palmach retaliation raids following attacks on water-pipelines to Jewish cities. On 16 August 1948, the Negev Brigade launched a full-scale clearing operation in the Kaufakha-Al Muharraqa area displacing villagers and Bedouin for military reasons. At the end of September, the Yiftach Brigade launched an operation west of Mishmar Hanegev expelling Arabs and confiscating their livestock. In early 1949 after the war, the Arab population was placed under military rule and Bedouins were concentrated into a specified zone east of Beersheba. In November 1949, 500 families were expelled across the border into Jordan and on 2 September 1950 some 4,000 Bedouin were forced across the border into Egypt.

During the 1948 Arab–Israeli war, Nahum Sarig, the Palmach commander in the Negev, instructed his officers that "Our job is to appear before the Arabs as a ruling force which functions forcefully but with justice and fairness." The stated provisions included: that they avoid harming women, children and friendly Arabs, that shepherds grazing on Jewish land should be driven off by gun-fire, that searches of Arab settlements be conducted "politely but firmly" and that "you are permitted to execute any man found in possession of a weapon".

Prior to 1948, it is estimated that there were between 65,000 and 90,000 Bedouin in the Negev, after the war this number decreased to 11,000.

=== Bedouin refugees in Jordan ===
Due to destabilizing tribal wars from 1780 to 1890 many Negev Bedouins tribes were forced to move to southern Jordan, Sinai peninsula. After the tribal war of 1890, tribal land boundaries remained fixed until the 1948 war, by which time the Beduin of the Negev numbered approximately 110,000, and were organized into 95 tribes and clans.

When Beersheba was occupied by the Israeli army in 1948, 90% of the Bedouin population of the Negev were forced to leave, expectating to return to their lands after the war – mainly to Jordan and Sinai peninsula. Of the approximately 110,000 Bedouin who lived in the Negev before the war about 11,000 remained.

=== Israel ===
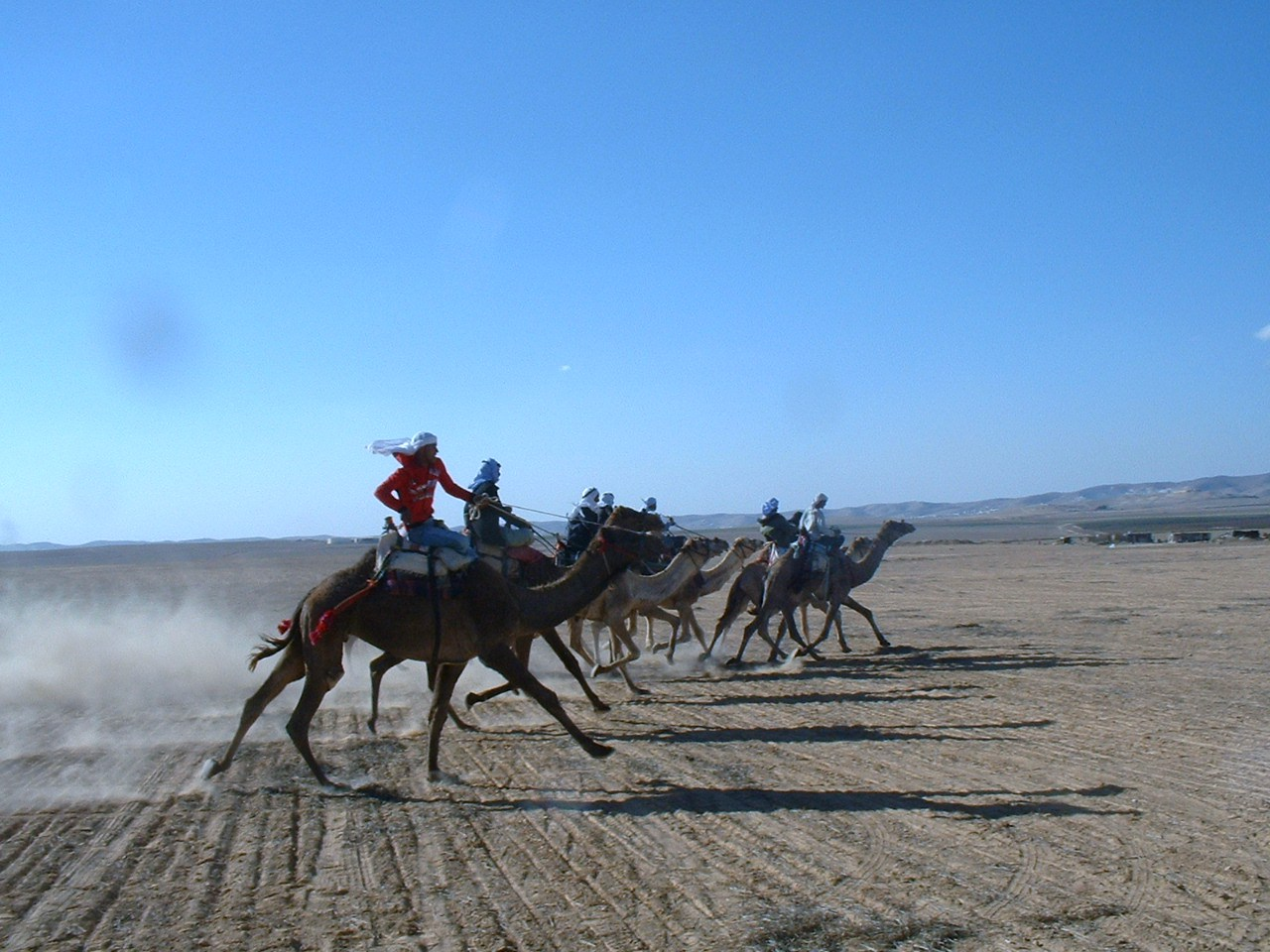
Traditional Bedouin camel race in the northern Negev near Arad, Israel

The first Israeli government headed by Prime Minister David Ben-Gurion opposed the return of the Bedouin from Jordan and Egypt. Furthermore, Ben-Gurion also wanted to expel the small number of Bedouin (11,000 or so) remaining in the Negev. He eventually changed his mind holding the view that the remaining Bedouin would not pose an obstacle to Jewish settlement there. However, he had most of them uprooted and relocated in the northeastern Negev, to an area referred to as the "Siyag." The lands of the Negev were nationalized, and the area was declared a military zone. The government saw the Negev as a potential home for the masses of Jewish immigrants, including Jewish emigrants from Arab lands. In the following years, some 50 Jewish settlements were established in the Negev.

The Bedouin who remained in the Negev mostly belonged to the Al-Tiyaha confederation as well as some smaller remaining groups of the 'Azazme and the Jahalin tribes. They were relocated by the Israeli government in the 1950s and 1960s to a restricted zone in the northeast corner of the Negev, called the Siyaj (Arabic: سياج Hebrew: אזור הסייג, which means "fenced zone" or "reservation area") made up of in 10% of the Negev desert in the northeast.

In 1951, the United Nations reported the deportation of about 7,000 Negev Bedouin to Jordan, the Gaza Strip and Sinai, but many returned undetected. The new government failed to issue the Bedouin identity cards until 1952 and deported thousands of Bedouin who remained within the new borders. Deportation continued into the late 1950s, as reported by the Haaretz newspaper in 1959: "The army's desert patrols would turn up in the midst of a Bedouin encampment day after day, dispersing it with a sudden burst of machine-gun fire until the sons of the desert were broken and, gathering what little was left of their belongings, led their camels in long silent strings into the heart of the Sinai desert."

== Land ownership issues ==
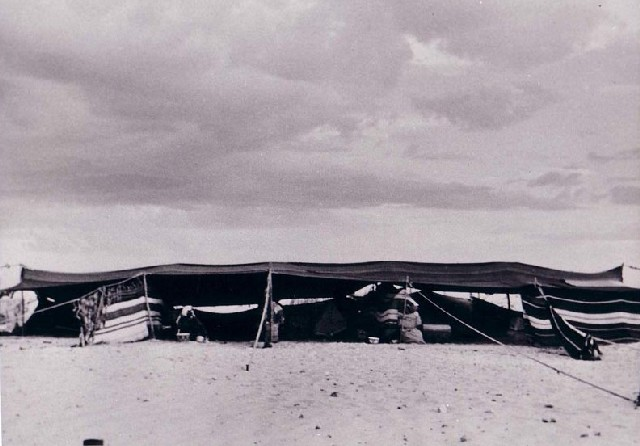
Bedouin tent near Rahat, 1950s

Israel's land policy was adapted to a large extent from the Ottoman land regulations of 1858. According to the 1858 Ottoman Land Law, lands that were not registered as of private ownership, were considered state lands. However, Bedouins were not motivated to register lands they lived on, because land ownership meant additional responsibilities for them, including taxation and military duty, and it created a new problem since they found it hard to prove their ownership rights. Israel relied mainly on Tapu recordings. Most of the Bedouin land fell under the Ottoman class of 'non-workable' (mawat) land and thus belonged to the state under Ottoman law. Israel confiscated most of the Negev lands, using The Land Rights Settlement Ordinance passed in 1969.

Israel's policies regarding the Negev Bedouin at first included regulation and relocation. During the 1950s Israel has re-located two-thirds of the Negev Bedouins into an area that was under a martial law. Bedouin tribes were concentrated in the Siyaj (Arabic for "fenced area") triangle of Beer Sheva, Arad and Dimona.

At the same time Bedouin herding was restricted by land expropriation. The Black Goat Law of 1950 curbed grazing, at least officially for the prevention of land erosion, thus prohibiting the grazing of goats outside recognized land holdings. Because few Bedouin territorial claims were recognized, most grazing was rendered illegal. Since both Ottoman and British land registration processes had failed to reach into the Negev region before Israeli rule, and since most Bedouin preferred not to register their lands, few Bedouin possessed any documentation of their land claims. Those whose land claims were recognized found it almost impossible to keep their goats within the periphery of their newly limited range. Into the 1970s and 1980s, only a small portion of the Bedouin were able to continue to graze their goats, and instead of migrating with their goats in search of pasture, most Bedouin migrated in search of work.

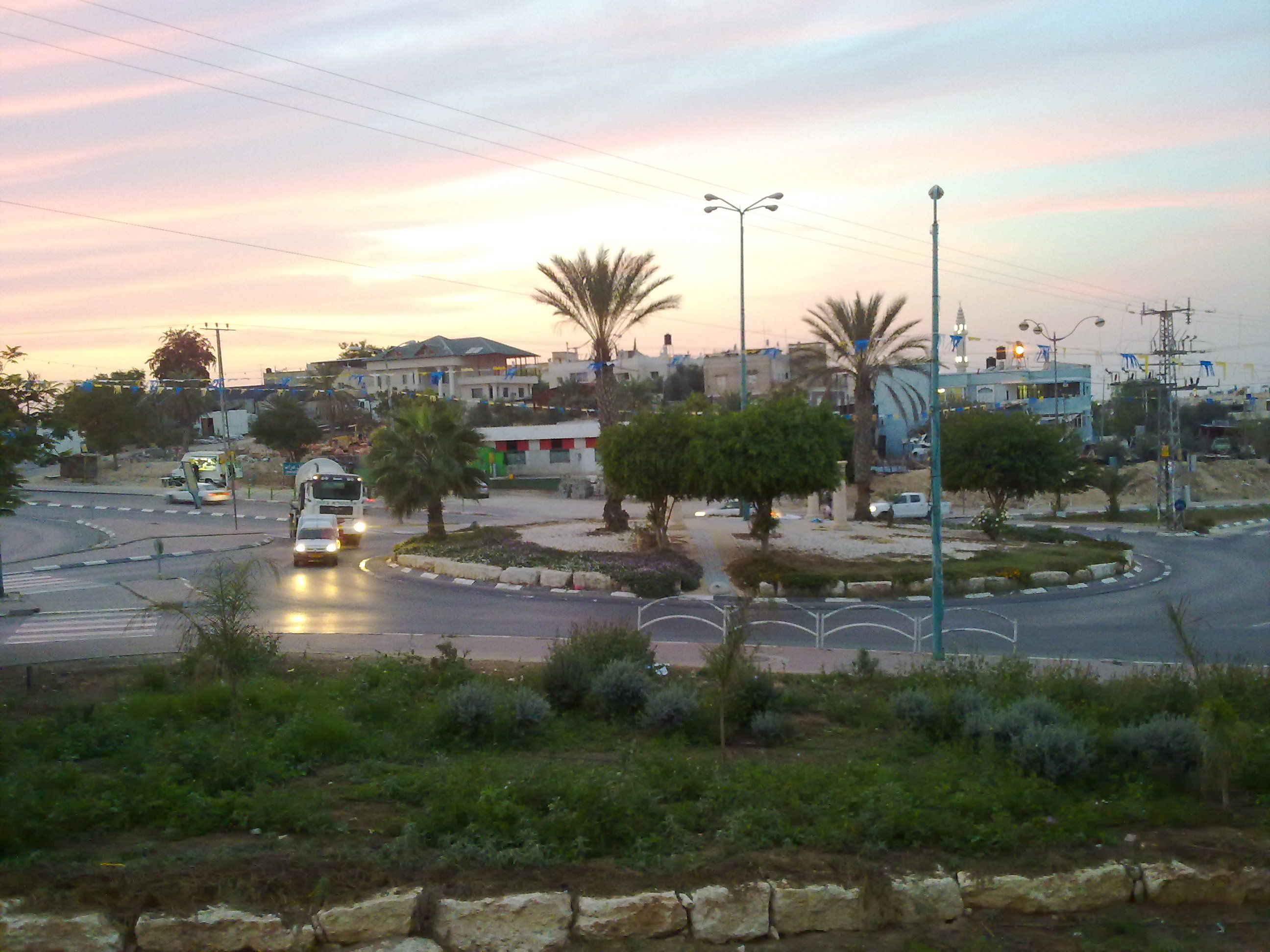
Rahat, the largest Bedouin city in the Negev

Despite state hegemony over the Negev, the Bedouin regarded 600,000 dunams (600 km^{2} or about 150,000 acres) of the Negev as theirs, and later petitioned the government for their return. Various claims committees were established to make legal arrangements to solve land disputes at least partially, but no proposals acceptable to both sides were approved. In the 1950s, as a consequence of losing access to their lands, many Bedouin men sought work on Jewish farms in the Negev. However, preference was given to Jewish labor, and as of 1958, employment in the Bedouin male population was less than 3.5%.

IDF Chief Moshe Dayan was in favor of transfer the Bedouin to the center of the country in order to eliminate land claims and create a cadre of urban laborers. In 1963, he told Haaretz:

"We should transform the Bedouin into an urban proletariat—in industry, services, construction, and agriculture. 88% of the Israeli population are not farmers, let the Bedouin be like them. Indeed, this will be a radical move which means that the Bedouin would not live on his land with his herds, but would become an urban person who comes home in the afternoon and puts his slippers on. His children will get used to a father who wears pants, without a dagger, and who does not pick out their nits in public. They will go to school, their hair combed and parted. This will be a revolution, but it can be achieved in two generations. Without coercion but with governmental direction ... this phenomenon of the Bedouins will disappear."

Ben-Gurion supported this idea, but the Bedouin strongly opposed. Later, the proposal was withdrawn.

IDF commander Yigal Allon proposed to concentrate the Bedouin in some large townships within the Siyag. This proposal resembled an earlier IDF plan, which intended to secure land suitable for settling Jews and setting up IDF bases as well as to remove the Bedouin from key Negev routes.

== Israeli-built townships ==
Between 1968 and 1989 the state established urban townships for housing of deported Bedouin tribes and promised Bedouin services in exchange for the renunciation of their ancestral land.

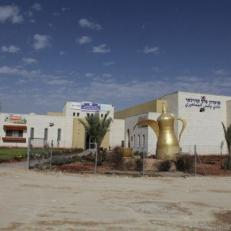
Hura school and community center

Within a few years, half of the Bedouin population moved into the seven townships built for them by the Israeli government.

The largest Bedouin locality in Israel is the city of Rahat, established in 1971. Other towns include Tel as-Sabi (Tel Sheva) (established in 1969), Shaqib al-Salam (Segev Shalom) in 1979, Ar'arat an-Naqab (Ar'ara BaNegev) and Kuseife in 1982, Lakiya in 1985 and Hura in 1989.

Most of those who moved into these townships were the Bedouin with no recognized land claims, although the overwhelming majority of historic land claims had been left unrecognized by the Israeli government.

According to Ben Gurion University's Negev Center for Regional Development, the towns were built without an urban policy framework, business districts or industrial zones; as Harvey Lithwick of the Negev Center for Regional Development explains: "The major failure was a lack of an economic rationale for the towns." According to Lithwick, and Ismael and Kathleen Abu Saad of Ben Gurion University, the towns quickly became among the most deprived towns in Israel, severely lacking in services such as public transport and banks. The urban townships were plagued by endemic joblessness and resulting cycles of crime and drug trafficking.

The Bedouin of Tarabin clan have moved into a township built for them, Tirabin al-Sana. The Bedouin of al-'Azazme clan will take part in the planning of a new quarter that will be erected for them to west of Segev Shalom township, cooperating with The Authority for the Regulation of Bedouin Settlement in the Negev.

According to a State Comptroller report from 2002, the Bedouin townships were built with minimal investment, and infrastructure in the seven townships had not improved much in the span of three decades. In 2002, most homes were not connected to the sewage system, the water supply was erratic and the roads were not adequate. Lessons were learned and new policies have been implemented since then, with the Israeli government allocating special funds to improve the wellbeing of the Negev Bedouin.

In 2008, a railway station opened near the largest Bedouin town in the Negev, Rahat (Lehavim-Rahat Railway Station), improving the transportation situation. Since 2009, Galim buses have been operating in Rahat.

== Unrecognized villages ==
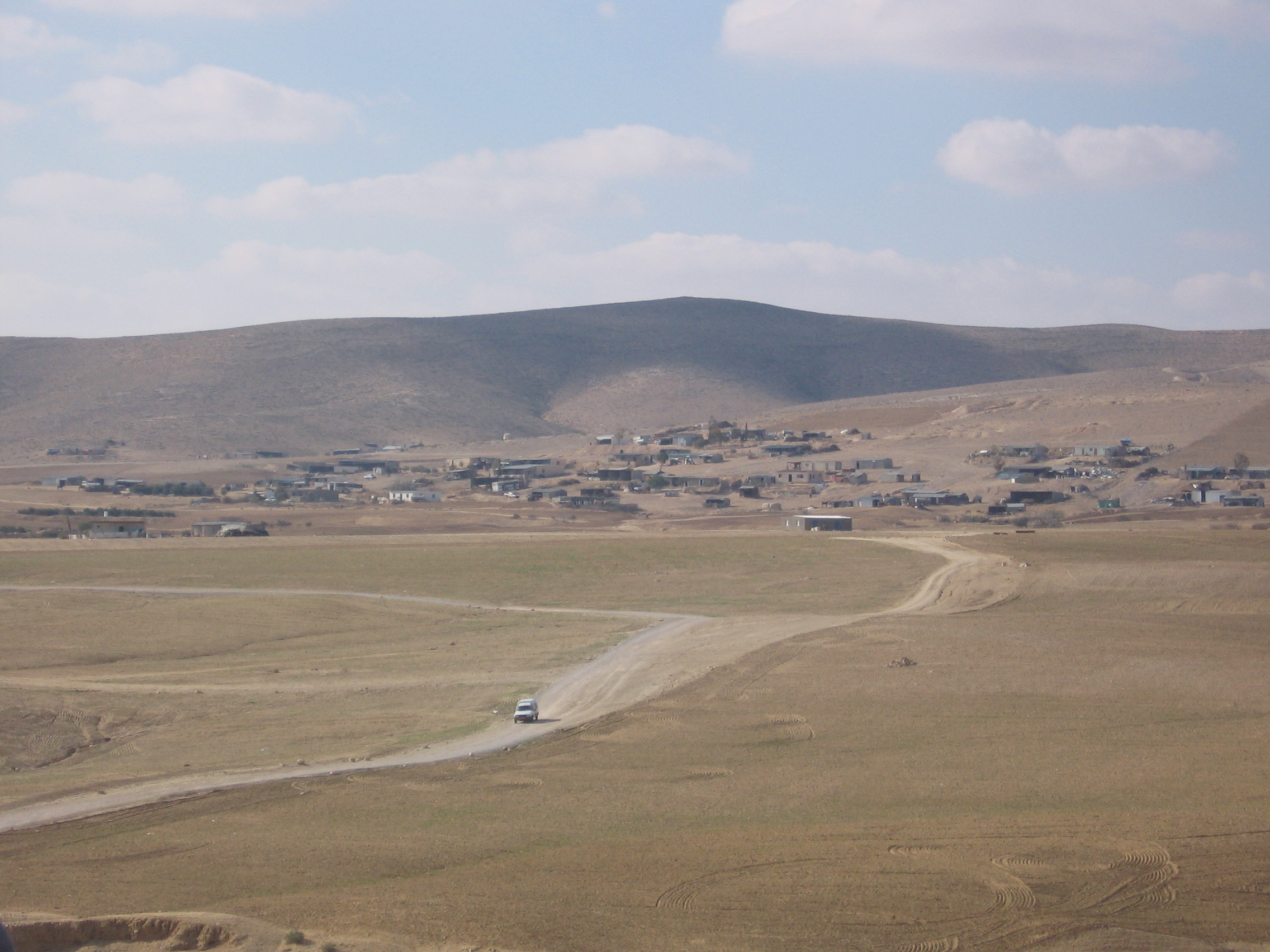
General view of one of the unrecognized Bedouin villages in the Negev Desert of Israel, January 2008

Those Bedouin who resisted sedentarization and urban life remained in their villages. In 2007, 39-45 villages were not recognized by the state and were thus ineligible for municipal services such as connection to the electrical grid, water mains or trash-pickup.

According to a 2007 report of the Israel Land Administration (ILA), 40% of the population were living in unrecognized villages. Many insist on remaining in unrecognized rural villages in the hope of retaining their traditions and customs, some of which pre-date Israel. However, in 1984, the courts ruled that the Negev Bedouin had no land ownership claims, effectively rendering their existing settlements illegal. The Israeli government defines these rural Bedouin villages as "dispersals" while the international community refers to them as "unrecognized villages". Most Bedouin in unrecognized villages do not see urban townships as a desirable place to live. Extreme unemployment has afflicted unrecognized villages as well, breeding extreme crime levels. Sources of income such as grazing have been severely restricted and the Bedouin rarely receive permits to engage in self-subsistence agriculture. However, in Besor Valley (Wadi Shallala), the ILA has leased JNF-owned land to Bedouin on a yearly-basis.

Today, several unrecognized villages are in the process of recognition. They have been incorporated into the Abu Basma Regional Council created for the purpose of dealing with specific problems of the Bedouin. So far they remain without water, electricity and garbage services, although there is a certain improvement: for example, in al-Sayyid two new schools were built and a medical clinic has been opened since its recognition in 2004. Development has been hampered by urban planning difficulties and land ownership problems. Due to the lack of municipal waste services and trash pickup, backyard burning has been adopted on a large scale, impacting badly on public health and the environment.

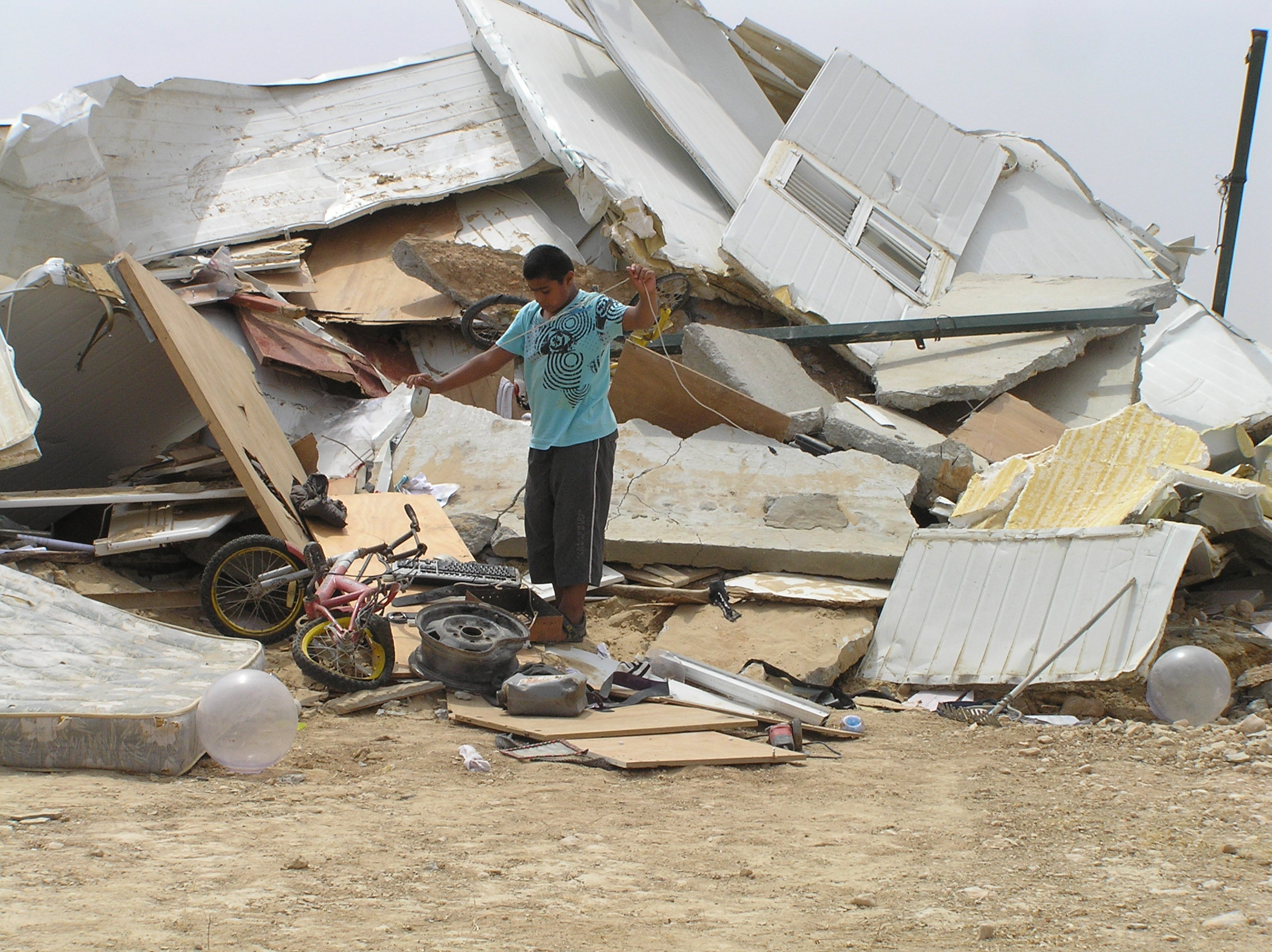
Demolished house in Al-Araqeeb, July 2010

Negev Bedouin claim the ownership of land totaling some 600,000 dunams (60,000 hectares or 230 square miles), or 12 times the size of Tel Aviv. When land ownership claims reach the court, few Bedouin can supply enough evidence to prove ownership since land lots they claim have never been registered in the Tabu, which is the only official way to register them. For example, in the Al-Araqeeb land ownership dispute, judge Sarah Dovrat has ruled in favor of the State, saying that the land was not "assigned to the plaintiffs, nor held by them under conditions required by law," and that they still had to "prove their rights to the land by proof of its registration in the Tabu."

On September 29, 2003, the government adopted the new "Abu Basma Plan" (Resolution 881), calling for a new regional council to unify unrecognized Bedouin settlements, the Abu Basma Regional Council. This resolution provided for the establishment of seven Bedouin townships in the Negev, and recognizing previously unrecognized villages, which would be granted municipal status and consequently all basic services and infrastructure. The council was established by the Interior Ministry on 28 January 2004.

In 2012, 13 Bedouin towns and cities were being built or expanded. Several new industrial zones are planned, such as Idan HaNegev on the suburbs of Rahat. It will have a hospital and a new campus inside.

== Prawer Plan ==
In September 2011, the Israeli government approved a five-year economic development plan called the Prawer Plan. One of its implications is a relocation of some 30,000-40,000 Negev Bedouin from areas not recognized by the government to government-approved townships. This will require Bedouins to leave ancestral villages, cemeteries and communal life as they know it.

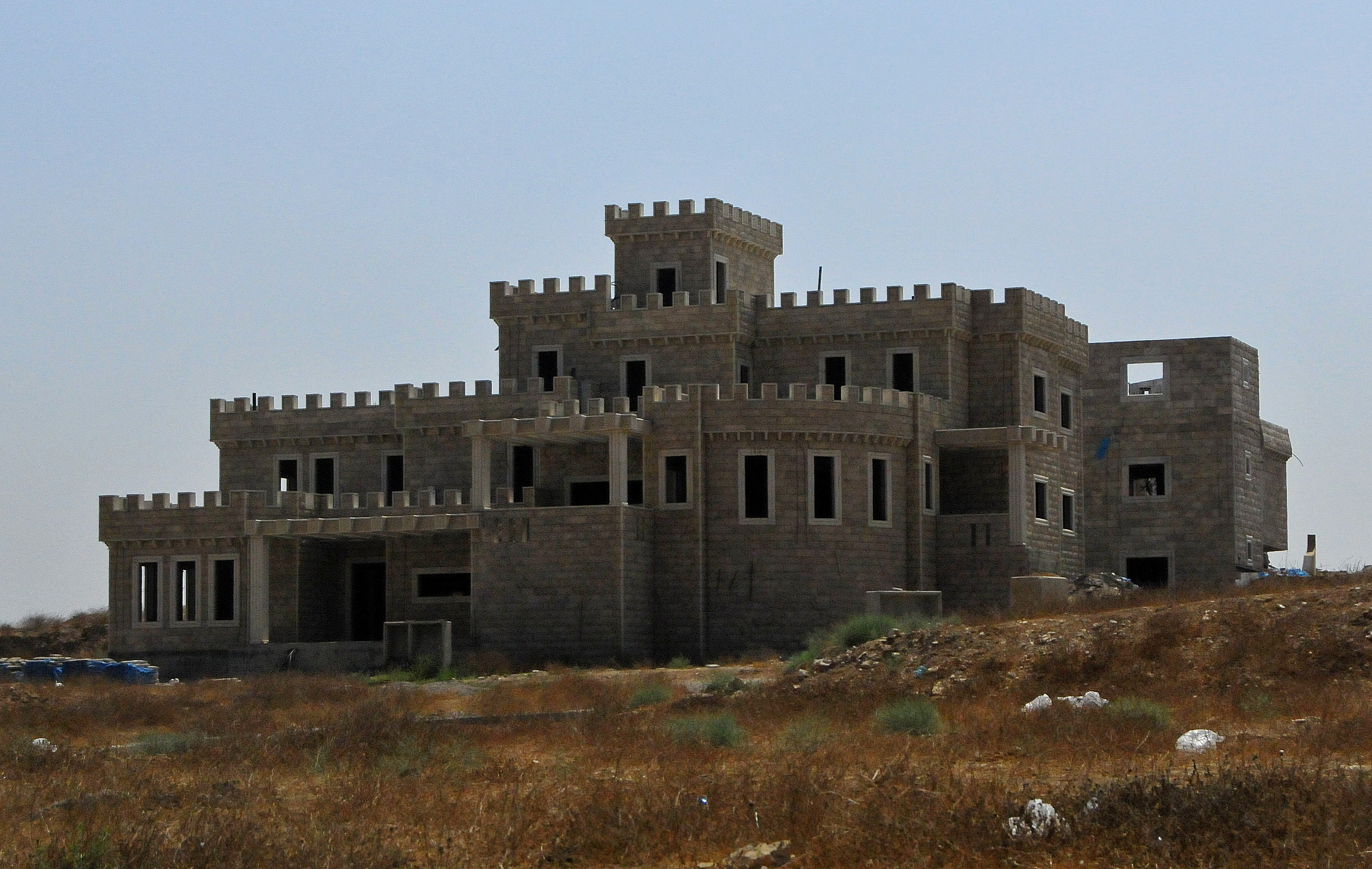
A private house being built in South Rahat

The plan is based on a proposal developed by a team headed by Ehud Prawer, the head of policy planning in the Prime Minister's Office (PMO). And this proposal, in its turn, is based on the recommendations of the committee chaired by retired Supreme Court Justice Eliezer Goldberg. Maj.-Gen. (ret.) Doron Almog was appointed as the head of the staff to implement the plan to provide status for the Bedouin communities in the Negev. Minister Benny Begin has been appointed by the cabinet to coordinate public and Bedouin population comments on the issue.

According to the Israeli Prime Ministers Office, the plan is based on four main principles:

1. Providing for the status of Bedouin communities in the Negev;
2. Economic development for the Negev's Bedouin population;
3. Resolving claims over land ownership; and
4. Establishing a mechanism for binding, implementation and enforcement, as well as timetables.

The plan was described as part of a campaign to develop the Negev; bring about better integration of Bedouin in Israeli society, and significantly reduce the economic and social gaps between the Bedouin population in the Negev and Israeli society.

The cabinet also approved a NIS 1.2 billion economic development program for Bedouin Negev whose main purpose is to promote employment among Bedouin women and youth. Funding was allocated to the development of industrial zones, establishment of employment centers and professional training.

According to the Prawer Plan, Bedouin communities will be expanded, some unrecognized communities will be recognized and receive public services, and infrastructure will be renewed, all within the framework of the Beer Sheva District masterplan. Most residents will be absorbed into the Abu Basma Regional Council and the nature of future communities, whether agricultural, rural, suburban or urban will be decided in full cooperation with the local Bedouin. For those who are to be relocated, 2/3 will receive a new residence nearby.

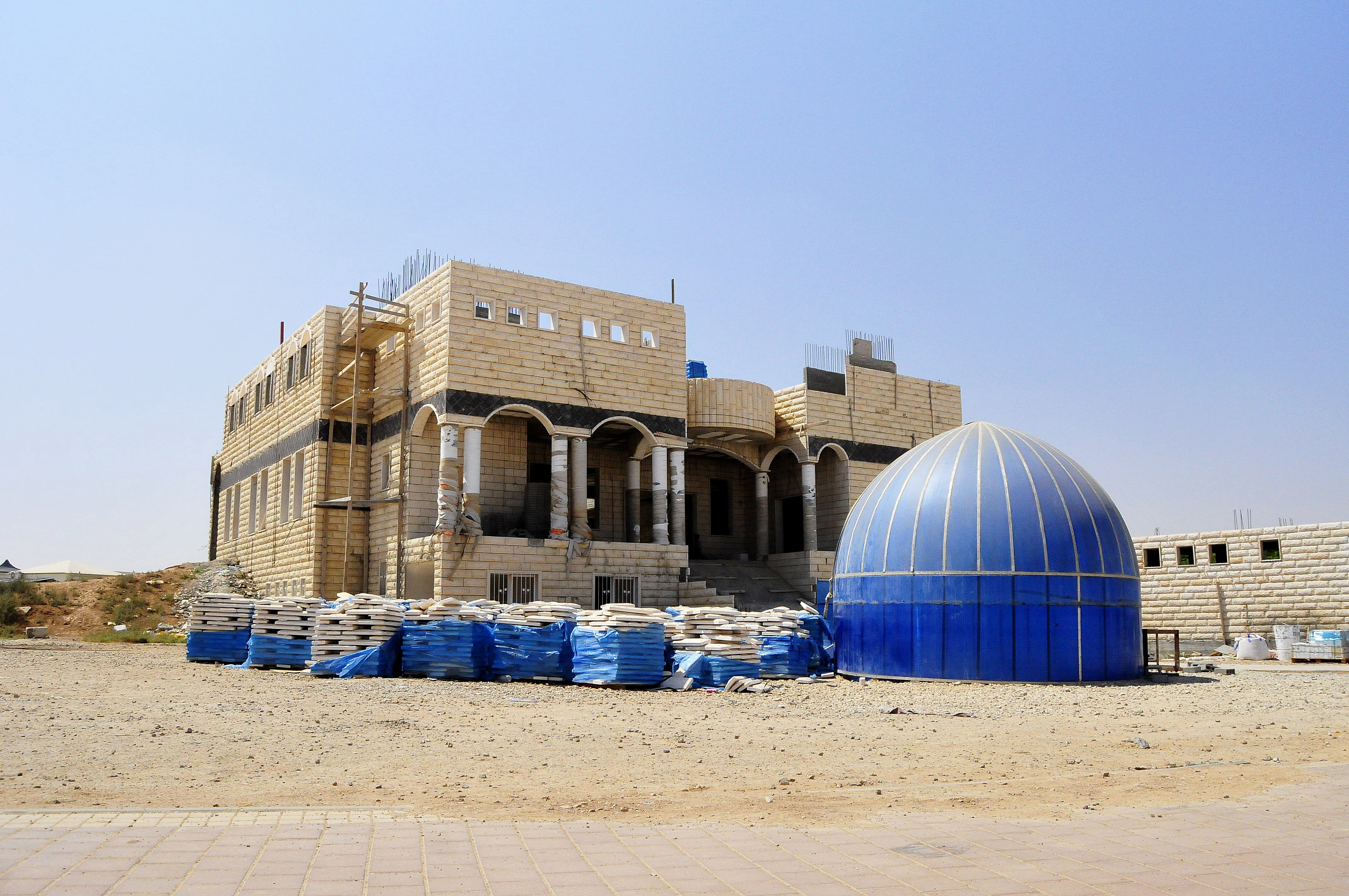
Tirabin al-Sana's mosque (its dome taken from mosque in the previous Tarabin tribe residence place next to Omer)

The Prawer Plan seeks to address the numerous land claims filed by the Bedouin, offering what the Israeli government states is "significant" compensation in land and funds, with each claim dealt with in a "unified and transparent way".

The proposed solution will be put into binding legislation—the Israeli Knesset will work out and accept appropriate legislation in the fall of 2012. Accordingly, the state will reorganize and strengthen the enforcement mechanism. A team headed by minister Benny Begin and Maj.-Gen. (ret.) Doron Almog is responsible for the implementation of this plan.

Critics say the Prawer Plan will turn Bedouin dispossession into law and come to a conclusion that relocation of the Bedouin will be compelled. Some even speak about ethnic cleansing. Several members of the European Parliament have heavily criticized the plan.

There are several examples of how the Prawer Plan has been implemented so far (As of June 2013): after a number of complicated discreet agreements with the state all of the Bedouin of Tarabin clan moved into a township built for them with all the amenities - Tirabin al-Sana. Following negotiations, the Bedouin of al-'Azazme clan will take part in the planning of a new quarter that will be erected for them to the west of Segev Shalom, cooperating with The Authority for the Regulation of Bedouin Settlement in the Negev.

In December 2013, the Israeli government shelved the plan to forcibly relocate about 40,000 Bedouin Arabs from their ancestral lands to government designated towns. One of the plan's architects stated that the Bedouin had neither been consulted nor agreed to the move. "I didn't tell anyone that the Bedouin agreed to my plan. I couldn't say that because I didn't present the plan to them," said the former minister Benny Begin.

The Association of Civil Rights in Israel stated that "the government now has an opportunity to conduct real and honest dialogue with the Negev Bedouin community and its representatives". The Negev Bedouin seek a solution to the problem of the unrecognised villages, and a future in Israel as citizens with equal rights."

== Resolution 3708 ==
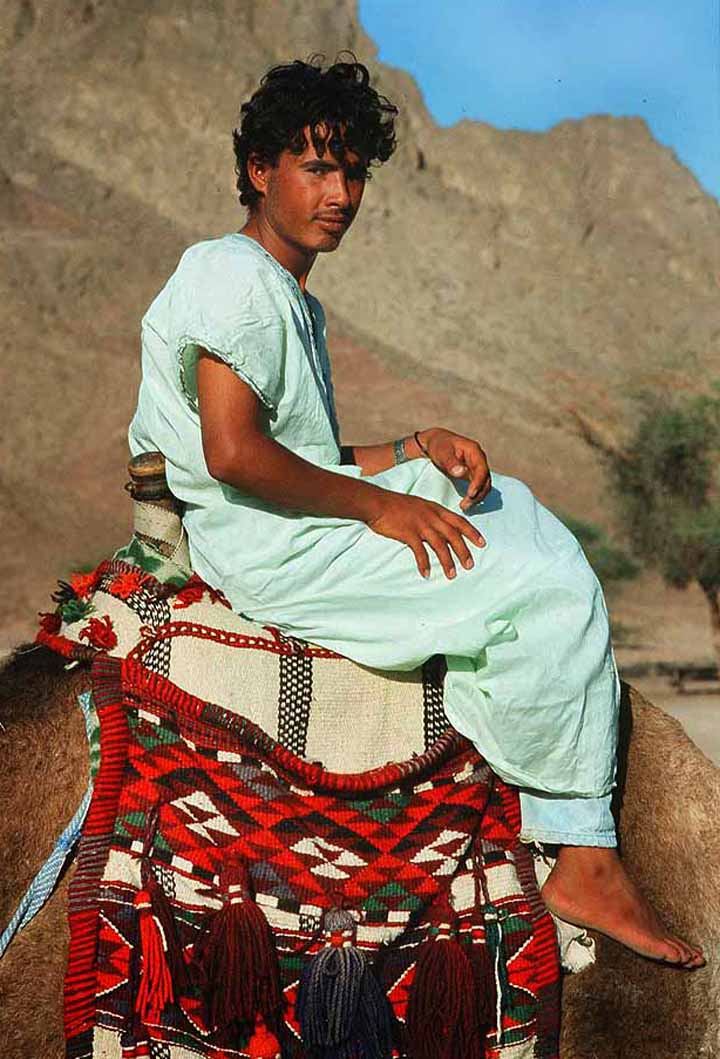
Bedouin man on camel

In September 2011, the government of Israel passed Resolution 3708, concerning the program to promote economic growth and development for the Bedouin population in the Negev. The Bureau for the Settlement and Economic Development of the Bedouin Sector in the Negev, which was at the time in the Prime Minister's Office, was given responsibility for supervising and monitoring the implementation of the development program.

Following government Resolution 1146 of January 5, 2014, responsibility for socioeconomic development and the status of Bedouin settlement in the Negev was transferred to the Ministry of Agriculture and Rural Development (MARD) and a program to integrate the Bedouin population in the Negev was initiated by the Planning Authority, which is the funding agency for monitoring and supervising implementation of the development program.

Resolution 3708 presented a five-year plan for 2012–2016 with goals of promoting the economic status of the Bedouin population in the Negev, strengthening Bedouin local authorities, and strengthening the social life, communities and leadership in the Bedouin population.

In order to achieve these goals, it was decided to focus investment on women and young adults, particularly in the areas of employment and education. The resolution addressed the following five areas:

1. Raising the employment rate of the Bedouin population in the Negev, diversifying the places of employment, and increasing the integration of the Bedouin in employment in the Israeli economy
2. Developing infrastructures, particularly those that support employment, education, and society
3. Strengthening personal security
4. Promoting education among the Bedouin in the Negev in order to increase their participation in the labor market
5. Strengthening and developing social life within the community and leadership in the villages, and expanding social services.

Several ministries were involved in implementation of the resolution: Economy, Education, Social Affairs and Services (MOSAS), MARD, Interior, Public Security, Defense (Security-Social Division), Transport and Road Safety, Culture and Sport, Development of the Negev and the Galilee, and Health.

The total budget for implementation of the resolution was NIS 1.2633 billion, of which 68% was a supplementary sum (not taken from the budgets of the ministries).

Clause 11 of Resolution 3708 stipulated that the program should be examined by an evaluation study. MARD commissioned the Myers-JDC-Brookdale Institute to examine the implementation of the resolution and its outcomes over a 3-year period. The study focused on four core areas that were important to the development and advancement of the Bedouin population and that represented 77% of the total budget allocated for the resolution (employment, social infrastructures, personal security, and education,

Following two interim reports, a final evaluation was released in 2018. Among the findings were the following:

- Establishing Riyan Employment Centers. The Riyan Centers provide participants with vocational guidance, professional training and job placement, and are situated in the communities themselves to take advantage of local resources. Prior to Resolution 3708, the centers operated in two only localities. With the implementation, they were distributed throughout all Bedouin local authorities and reached almost 10,000 people. About 50% of the men and 30% of the women were placed in jobs within a year of joining.
- Practical Engineering Studies for Adults. Prior to the Resolution, Bedouin students in the Shiluv Program studied in separate college classes. Following the Resolution, the study model was changed, with students integrated into regular college classes and also receiving financial and personal support. As of 2017, 305 students had entered the engineering track, a quarter of whom were women.
- Improved Access to Transportation. Since the Resolution, the number of inter-city trips increased by 94%, and of intra-city trips, by 43%.
- Centers of Excellence. The Centers of Excellence are offer a weekly after-school program for students in grades 3–6, with a compulsory course in science and technology and an elective in a choice of subjects. Six centers became operative under the Resolution and, in 2017, served some 900 students.

== Healthcare ==
The Bedouin benefited from the introduction of modern health care in the region. According to the World Zionist Organization, although in the 1980s, as compared with 90% of the Jewish population, only 50% of the Bedouin population was covered by Israel's General Sick Fund, the situation improved after the 1995 National Health Insurance Law incorporated another 30% of Negev Bedouin into the Sick Fund. There are branches of several health funds (medical clinics) operating in the seven Bedouin townships: Leumit, Clalit, Maccabi and Tipat Halav perinatal (baby care) centers.

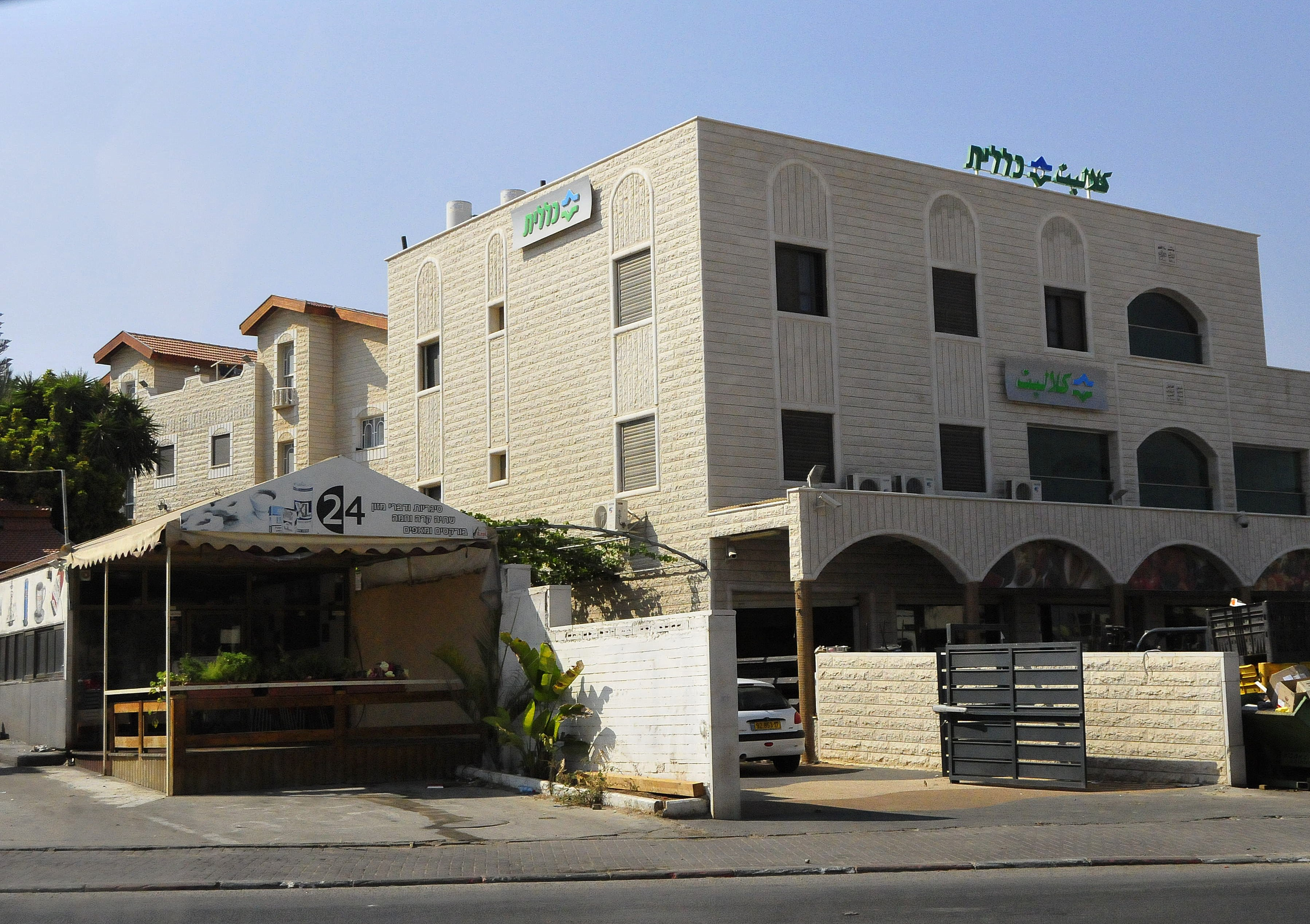
One of medical clinics in Rahat

The Bedouin infant mortality rate is still the highest in Israel, and one of the highest in the developed world. In 2010, the mortality rate of Bedouin babies rose to 13.6 per 1,000, compared to 4.1 per 1,000 in Jewish communities in the south. According to the Israeli Ministry of Health, 43 percent of deaths among infants up to a year old result from hereditary conditions and/or birth defects. Other reasons cited for the higher infant mortality rates are poverty, lack of education and proper nourishment of mothers, lack of access to preventive medical care and unwillingness to undergo recommended tests. In 2011, funding for this purpose was tripled.

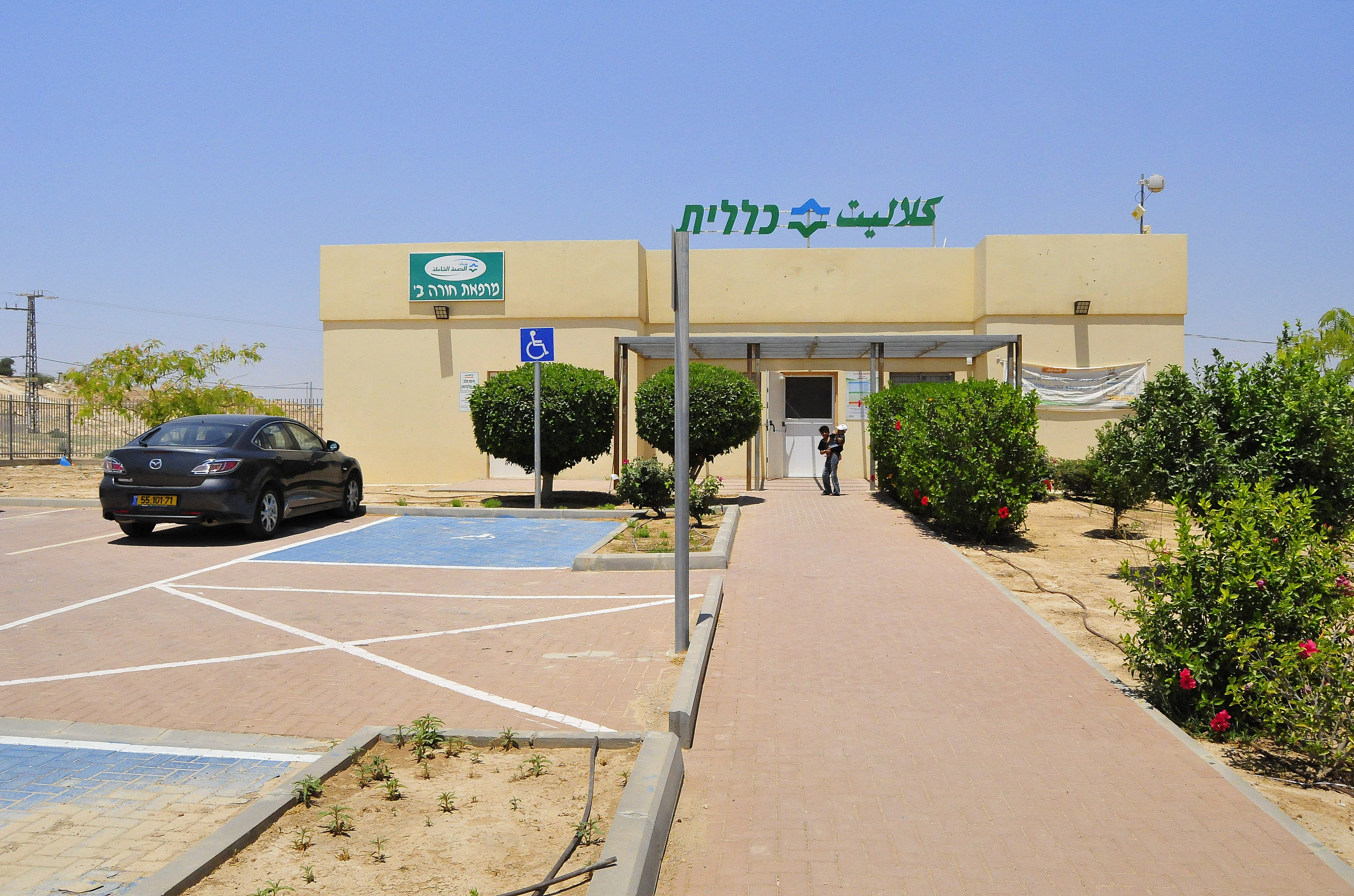
A medical clinic in Hura

60% of Bedouin men smoke. Among the Bedouin, as of 2003, 7.3% of females and 9.9% of males have diabetes. Between 1998 and 2002, Bedouin towns and villages had among the highest per-capita hospitalization rates, Rahat and Tel Sheva ranked highest. However, the rate of reported new cancer incidents in Bedouin localities is very low, with Rahat having the 3rd-lowest rate in Israel at 141.9 cases per 100,000, compared to 422.1 cases in Haifa.

The Centre for Women's Health Studies and Promotion notes that in the unrecognised Bedouin villages in the Negev, very few health care facilities are available; ambulances do not serve the villages and 38 villages have no medical services. According to the Israeli NGO Physicians for Human Rights-Israel the number of doctors is a third of the norm.

In urban townships, access to water is also an issue: an article from the World Zionist Organization Hagshama Department explains that water allocation to Bedouin towns is 25-50% of that to Jewish towns. Since the State has not built water infrastructure in the unrecognized villages, residents must buy water and store it in large tanks where fungi, bacteria and rust develop very quickly in the plastic containers or metal tanks under conditions of extreme heat; this has led to numerous infections and skin diseases.

== Education ==
In the 1950s, mandatory schooling was extended to the Bedouin sector, leading to a massive increase in literacy levels. Illiteracy decreased from around 95% to 25% within the span of a single generation, with the majority of the illiterate being 55 or older.

Drop-out rates were once very high among Negev Bedouin. In 1998 only 43 percent of Bedouin youngsters reached the 12th grade. Enforcement of mandatory education for the Bedouin was weak, particularly in the case of young girls. According to a 2001 study by the Centre for Women's Health Studies and Promotion more than 75% of Bedouin women had never been to or completed elementary school. This was due to a combination of internal Bedouin traditional attitudes towards women, lack of government enforcement of the Mandatory Education Law and insufficient budgets for Bedouin schools.

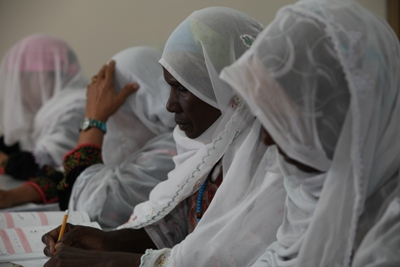
Literacy classes for Bedouin women, Lehavim

However, the number of Bedouin students in Israel is on the rise. Arabic summer schools are being developed. In 2006, 162 Bedouin men and 112 Bedouin women were studying at Ben Gurion University. In particular, the number of female students grew sixfold from 1996 to 2001. The university offers special Bedouin scholarship programs to encourage higher education among the Bedouin. In 2013, there were 350 Bedouin women and 150 Bedouin men studying at Ben Gurion University.

According to data released by the Knesset Research and Information Center in July 2012, at least 800 young Bedouins from the Negev (out of overall 1300 Israeli students studying in PA) opted for universities in the Palestinian enclaves, mainly Hebron and Jenin, preferring Muslim studies (Sharia) and education. It's a relatively new phenomenon, occurring in the past year or two and its main reasons are relatively difficult psychometric exams hampering to be accepted into Israeli universities and colleges (in PA there is no such a requirement), absence of Muslim studies subject in them and a language barrier.

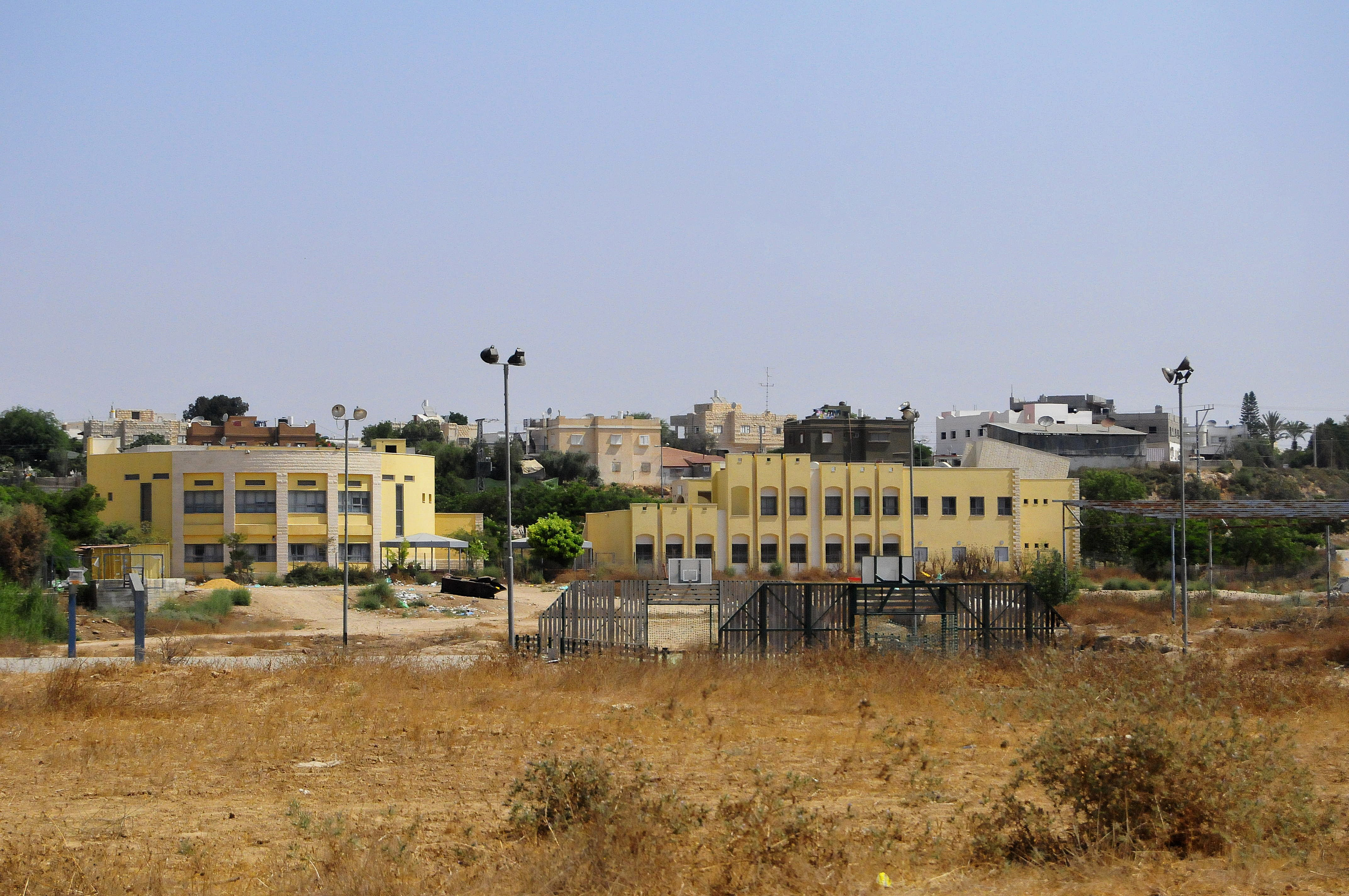
One of eight (July 2012) Rahat schools

In fall 2011 Ben-Gurion University of the Negev has revived a special program preparing Bedouins to fill a dire need in school psychologists in their communities' schools due to a host of issues particular to this population, from aged-old inter-clan rivalries to the emotional fallout from polygamy. This program is leading to a master's degree in educational psychology for Arab-Israeli and Bedouin students. Program's leaders admit that only a professional from within the society can fully understand the intricacies of its unique situations.

Additionally, a new Harvard University campus will be established in Rahat inside Idan HaNegev industrial zone in the coming years. It will be the first campus built in this Bedouin city. Ben-Gurion University of the Negev will oversee the new campus' operations, and it will be considered a BGU branch.

A few years ago the Association of Academics for the Development of Arab Society in the Negev (AHD) has established a new science high school at the Shoket Junction. This school hosts some 380 students in grades nine through twelve from Bedouin Arab towns and villages. First students graduated it in the spring of 2012.

== Women's status ==
According to a range of studies, including a 2001 study by the Centre for Women's Health Studies and Promotion at Ben Gurion University, in the transition from self-subsistence agriculture and animal husbandry to a settled semi-urban lifestyle, women have lost their traditional sources of power within the family. The study explains that poor access to education among women has triggered new disparities between Bedouin men and women and compounded the loss of Bedouin women's status in the family. Nevertheless, due to high levels of poverty among the Bedouin more and more Bedouin women are starting to work outside their homes and reinforce their status. However, some of these women encounter fierce resistance from family members, and in some cases have experienced physical violence and even murder.

There were reports that some Bedouin tribes had previously conducted female genital mutilation. However, this practice was considered far less severe than what is carried out in some places in Africa, consisting of a "small" cut. The practice was carried out independently by women, and men didn't play a part and in most cases were unaware of the practice. However, by 2009 the practice seemed to have disappeared. Researchers are unclear as to how it disappeared (the Israeli government was not involved) but suggest modernisation as the probable cause.

== Economy ==
Bedouins at a market in Beersheba, November 2012

Traditionally given over to shepherding their flocks and foraging for edible roots and herbs, while living a nomadic way of life, many Bedouins, since the mid–late 20th-century, have been forced to relocate and move into permanent settlements. This change has disrupted their traditional way of life and has, subsequently, affected many changes in the community. The Negev Bedouin suffer from extreme rates of joblessness and the highest poverty rate in Israel. A 2007 Van Leer Institute study found that 66 percent of Negev Bedouin lived below the poverty line (in unrecognized villages, the figure reached 80 percent), compared 25 percent in the Israeli population.

Data collected by the Industry, Trade and Labor Ministry in 2010 show that the employment rate among the Bedouin is 35 percent, the lowest of any sector in Israeli society. Traditionally, Bedouin men are the breadwinners, while Bedouin women do not work outside the home.

As of 2012, 81 percent of Bedouin women of working age were unemployed. Nevertheless, a growing number of women have begun to join the work force.

Several NGOs are helping to expand entrepreneurship by providing professional training and guidance. Twenty Arab-Bedouin women from Rahat, Lakiya, Tel Sheva, Segev Shalom, Kuseife and Rachma participated in a sewing course for fashion design at Amal College in Beer Sheva, including lessons on sewing and cutting, personal empowerment and business initiatives. As a result, tourism and crafts are growing industries and in some cases, such as Drijat, have reduced unemployment significantly. The new industrial zones being constructed in the region are also increasing job opportunities.

== Crime ==
The crime rate in the Bedouin sector in the Negev is among the highest in the country. To that end, a special police unit, codenamed Blimat Herum (lit. emergency halt), consisting of about 100 regular policemen, was founded in 2003 to fight crime in the sector. The Southern District of the Israel Police cited the rising crime rate in the sector as the reason for the unit's inauguration. The unit was founded after a period of time when regular police units conducted raids on Bedouin settlements to stop theft (especially car theft) and drug dealing. In 2004 a new police station was opened in Rahat, it has around 70 staff policemen.

== Environmental issues ==
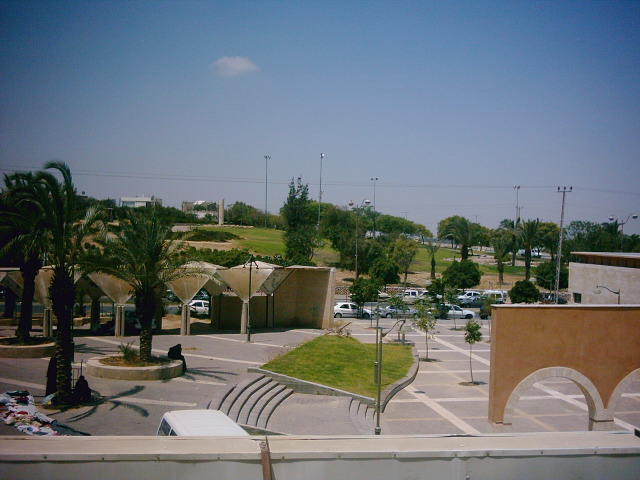
Rahat park

In 1979, a 1,500 square kilometer area in the Negev was declared a protected nature reserve, rendering it out of bounds for Bedouin herders. In conjunction with this move the Green Patrol, a law compliance unit was established that disbanded 900 Bedouin encampments and cut goat herds by more than a third. With the black goat nearly extinct, black goat hair to weave tents is hard to come by.

Israeli environmental leader Alon Tal claims Bedouin construction is among the top ten environmental hazards in Israel. In 2008, he wrote that the Bedouin are taking up open spaces that should be used for park land. In 2007, Bustan organization disagreed with this contention: "Regarding rural Bedouin land use as a threat to open spaces fails to take into account the fact that Bedouin occupy little more than 1% of the Negev and fails to call into question the IDF's hegemony over more than 85% of the Negev's open spaces." Gideon Kressel has proposed a brand of pastoralism that preserves open spaces for rangeland herding.

Wadi al-Na'am is located close to the Ramat Hovav toxic waste dump, and its residents have suffered from higher than average incidences of respiratory illnesses and cancer. Given the small scale of the country, Bedouin and Jews of the region share some 2.5% of the desert with Israel's nuclear reactors, 22 agro and petrochemical factories, an oil terminal, closed military zones, quarries, a toxic waste incinerator (Ramat Hovav), cell towers, a power plant, several airports, a prison, and 2 rivers of open sewage.

== Demographics ==
The Bedouin comprise the youngest population in Israeli society - about 54 percent of the Bedouin population was younger than 14 in 2002. With an annual growth rate of 5.5% that same year, which is one of the highest in the world, the Bedouin in Israel were doubling their population every 15 years. Bedouin advocates argue that the main reason for the transfer of the Bedouin into townships against their will is demographic. In 2003, Director of the Israeli Population Administration Department, Herzl Gedj, described polygamy in the Bedouin sector a "security threat" and advocated various means of reducing the Arab birth rate. In 2004, Ronald Lauder of the Jewish National Fund, announced plans to increase the number of Jews in the Negev by 250,000 in five years and 500,000 in ten years into the Negev through the Blueprint Negev, incurring opposition from Bedouin rights groups concerned that the unrecognized villages might be cleared to make way for Jewish-only development and potentially ignite internal civil strife.

In 1999, 110,000 Bedouin lived in the Negev, 50,000 in the Galilee and 10,000 in the central region of Israel. As of 2013, the Bedouin population in the Negev numbered 200,000-210,000.

== Identity and culture ==
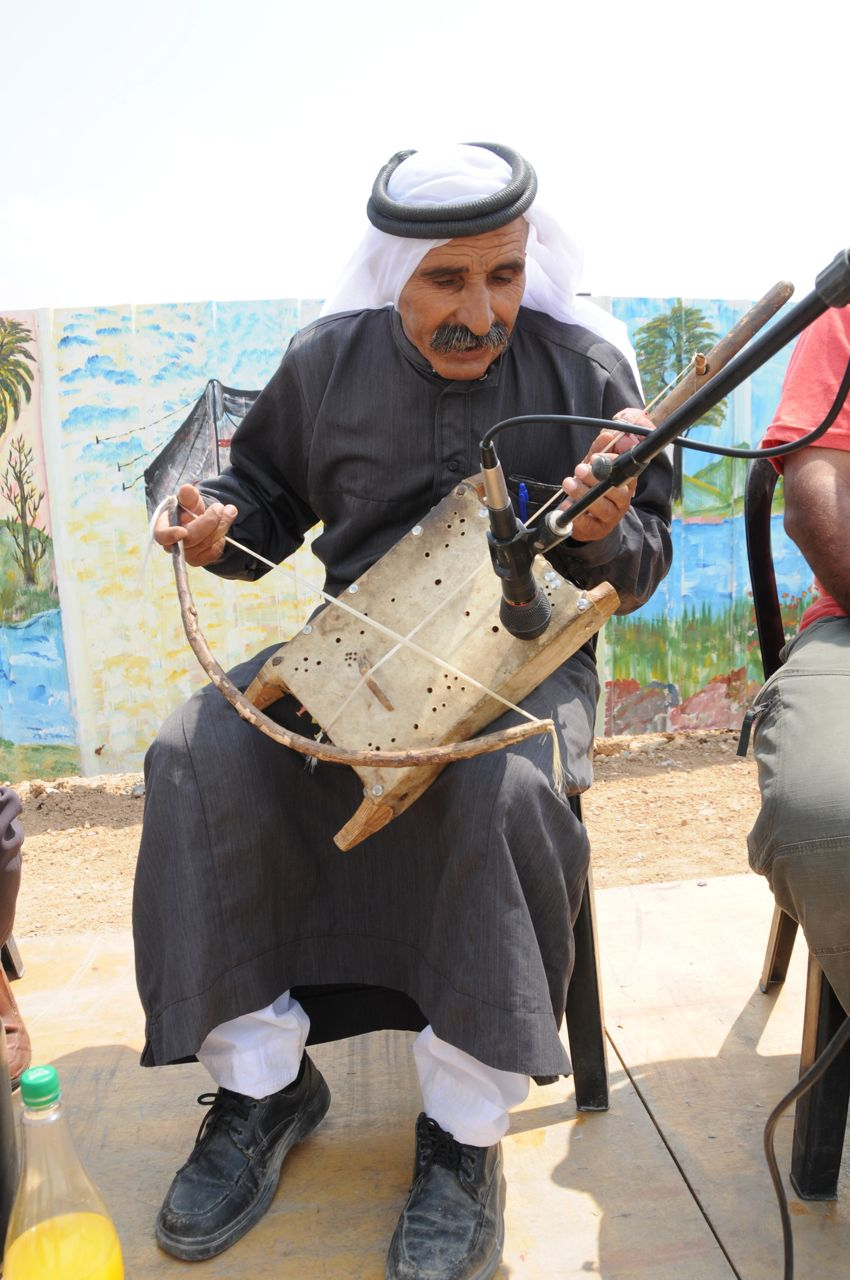
Playing Bedouin music on the rababa, 2009

The Bedouin consider themselves Arabs with their origin being modern Saudi Arabia. The Bedouins are seen as Arab culture's purest representatives, "ideal" Arabs, but they are distinct from other Arabs because of their extensive kinship networks, which provide them with community support and the basic necessities for survival.

The Negev Bedouin have been compared to Native Americans, in terms of how they have been treated by the dominant cultures. The Regional Council of Unrecognized Villages describes the Negev Bedouin as an "indigenous" population. However, some researchers contest this view.

The Bedouin have their own authentic and distinct culture, rich oral poetic tradition, honor code and a code of laws. Despite the problem of illiteracy, the Bedouin attribute importance to natural events and ancestral traditions. The Bedouin of Arabia were the first converts to Islam, and it is an important part of their identity today.

Their outfit is also different from that of other Arabs, since the men wear long 'jellabiya' and a 'smagg' (red white draped headcover) or 'aymemma' (white headcover) or a white small headdress, sometimes held in place by an 'agall' (a black cord). Bedouin women usually wear brightly colored long dresses but outside they wear 'abaya' (a thin, long black coat sometimes covered with shiny embroidery) and they will always cover their head and hair with a 'tarha' (a black, thin shawl) when they leave their house.

=== Traditional skill-crafts ===
The Bedouin women of the Negev were once renowned for their skills in making black, goat-hair matted tent flaps for constructing tents (known locally as bayt al-shar), but this practice is now nearly lost and found almost exclusively among Bedouins in Jordan. Still, the Bedouins of the Negev have maintained and passed down certain skill crafts, such as basketry and weaving rope with a plant fiber known to them as mitnān, or what is called in English "shaggy sparrow-wort" (Thymelaea hirsuta), and dyeing wool with a yellow dye extracted from the stalks and roots of the Desert broomrape (Cistanche tubulosa), a plant known locally by the name dhunūn and halūq.

Bedouins of the Negev and Sinai have traditionally made use of the solidified resin extracted from the seeds of the ban tree (Moringa peregrina) to treat (rosin) the strings of the Arab violin (rebābah).

Glue was made from the siyāl tree (Acacia raddiana), by mixing its sap with warm water.

Traditional coffee ritual

The Bedouins of the Negev traditionally prepare coffee for guests in a ritualistic fashion. First, they roast the coffee beans in a pan called a "mihmasa". Next, they grind the beans in a wooden mortar and pestle called an "azzam" (literally: "the inviter"). Finally, they repeatedly boil the coffee in a metal pot called a "bakraj", and serve it to the guest in a small handless cup called "finjan".

== Relationship with Israel ==
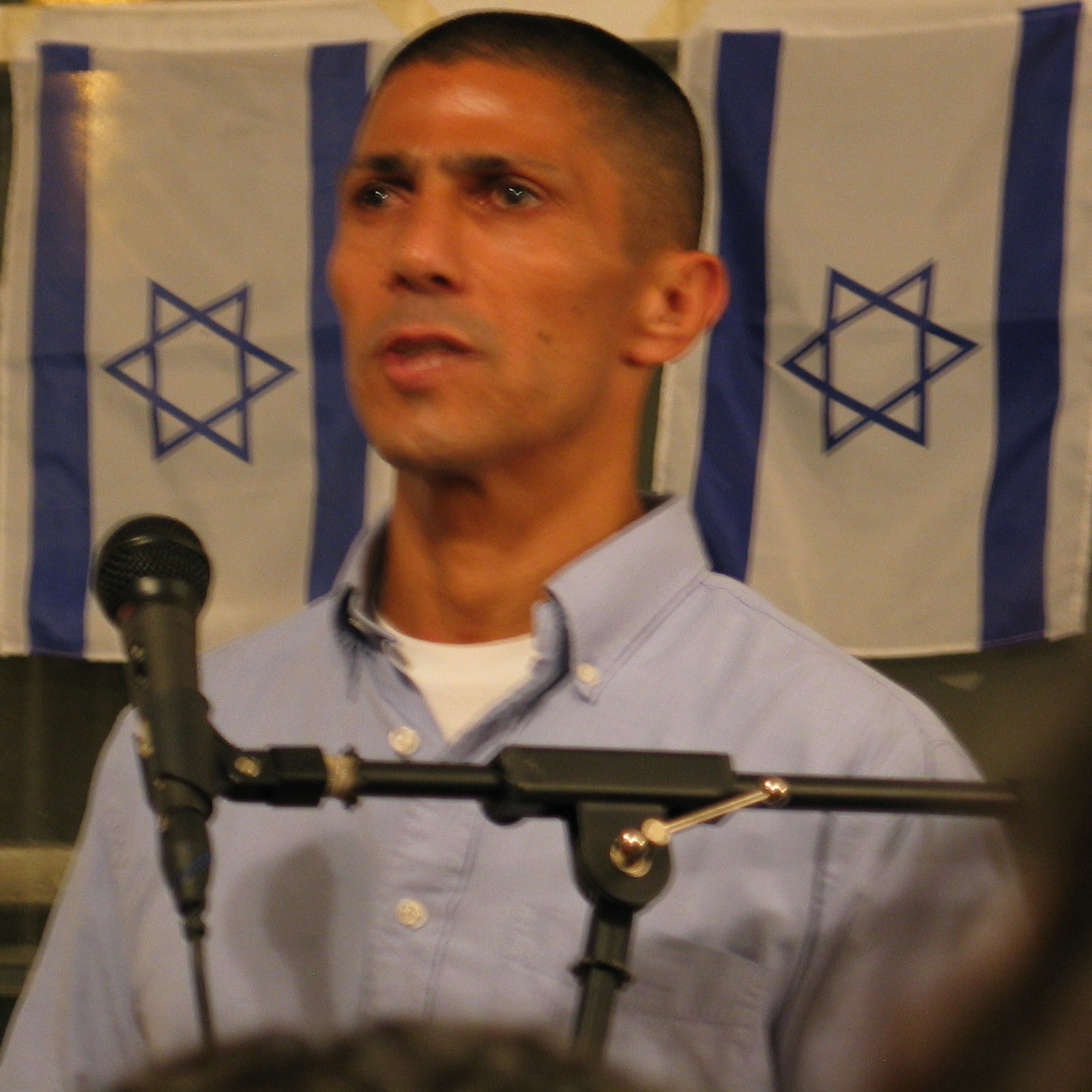
Ismail Khaldi, Israeli vice consul

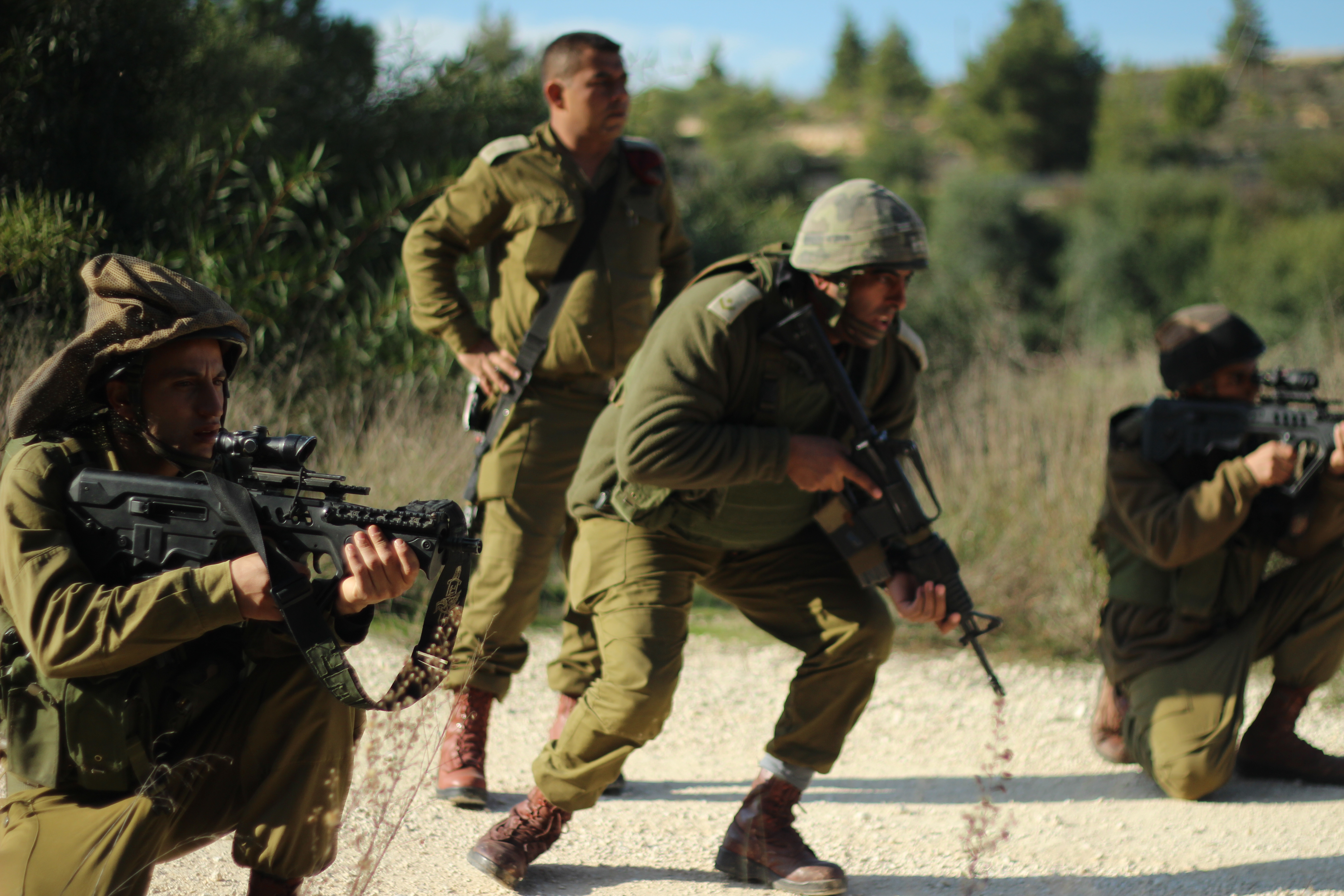
Bedouin soldiers in Israel Defense Forces.

Many Bedouin serve as trackers in the IDF's elite tracking units, tasked with securing the border from infiltration. Amos Yarkoni, first commander of the Shaked Reconnaissance Battalion in the Givati Brigade, was a Bedouin (born Abd el-Majid Hidr), although not from the Negev.

The circulated number of Bedouin of draft age volunteering for the Israeli army each year (unlike Druze, Circassian and most Jewish Israelis, they are not required to serve), varies between 5%-10%, or, as estimated by Doron Almog, head of Israel's Bedouin Improvement Program Staff, in August 2012, it stands at half a percentage of eligible Bedouins. A 2013 source sets the number of Bedouin servicemen on active duty at about 1,600, two-thirds of whom come from the north. According to The Economist, the Bedouin who were once "unusual among Israel's Arabs for their readiness to serve in Israel's army" have slumped in volunteers "to a mere 90 of 1,500-plus men eligible to join up every year" due to a souring of relations between Bedouin and Jewish Israelis.

A 2001 poll suggests that Bedouin feel more estranged from the state than do Arabs in the north. A Jewish Telegraphic Agency article reports that, "forty-two percent said they reject Israel's right to exist, compared with 16 percent in the non-Bedouin Arab sector." But a 2004 study found that Negev Bedouins tend to identify more as Israelis than other Arab citizens of Israel.

Ismail Khaldi is the first Bedouin vice consul of Israel and the highest ranking Muslim in the Israeli foreign service. Khaldi is a strong advocate of Israel. While acknowledging that the Israeli relationship with its Bedouin minority is not ideal, he said:

I am a proud Israeli – along with many other non-Jewish Israelis such as Druze, Baháʼí, Bedouin, Christians and Muslims, who live in one of the most culturally diversified societies and the only true democracy in the Middle East. Like America, Israeli society is far from perfect, but let us deals honestly. By any yardstick you choose—educational opportunity, economic development, women and gays' rights, freedom of speech and assembly, legislative representation—Israel's minorities fare far better than any other country in the Middle East.

=== October 7 Hamas attack on Israel ===
The 7 October 2023 attack by Hamas on southern Israel significantly impacted the Negev Bedouins, both in terms of casualties and the broader implications for the community. During these attacks, at least 21 Bedouins were killed, and six taken hostage by Hamas, with casualties occurring both in the initial onslaught and subsequent rocket fire from Gaza. The victims included both civilians and Bedouin members of the Israeli armed forces. Several of the hostages died after being taken into Gaza.

In response to the attacks, community volunteers rallied to provide aid and support to affected people. Many instances of heroism were reported within the Bedouin community during the crisis, transcending ethnic divides. For example, a Bedouin man, Yussef Alzianda, saved approximately 30 people from the Nova music festival massacre by driving them to safety amid the chaos of the Hamas attack. In another case, an Israeli family in Sderot encountered Hamas fighters near a commercial complex in the city. Dolev Swissa, the father, was fatally shot while attempting to flee with his family. Amid the chaos, Odia Swissa struggled to drive her daughters to safety. Amer Abu Sabila, a 25-year-old Bedouin construction worker from Abu Talul, noticed Odia's distress and took over the driving in an attempt to move the car out of the firing range. Near the Sderot police station, militants opened fire on the vehicle, killing both Abu Sabila and Odia Swissa, as well as policemen who tried to assist them. The story of Amer Abu Sabila's heroic act garnered widespread recognition in Israel, stirring discussions about the coexistence and cooperation between Arabs and Jews in Israel.

== Relationship with Palestinians ==
Before 1948 the relationships between Negev Bedouin and the farmers to the north was marked by intrinsic cultural differences as well as common language and some common traditions. Whereas the Bedouin referred to themselves as "arab" instead of "bedû" (Bedouin), "fellahîn" (farmers) in the area used the term Bedû, meaning "inhabitants of the desert" (Bâdiya), more often.

While both are Arabs, some Palestinians do not consider the Bedouin to be Palestinian, and elements within the Negev/Naqab Bedouin do not consider themselves Palestinian. However, some scholars regard distinct people's attempt to maintain their historic identity as an illustration of a strategy of 'Divide to Rule'. In recent years, the ascendance of Islamic political activism among Negev Bedouin Arabs has gained increasing prominence at the expense of Bedouin historical neutrality and tribal based self-identification. In addition, both Israelis and Palestinians have engaged in land confiscation further causing identity tensions amongst Bedouin.

A 2001 study suggested that regular meetings and cross border exchanges with relatives or friends in the West Bank, Gaza Strip and Sinai are more common than expected, casting doubt on the accepted view of the relationship between the Bedouin and Palestinians.

== Gallery ==
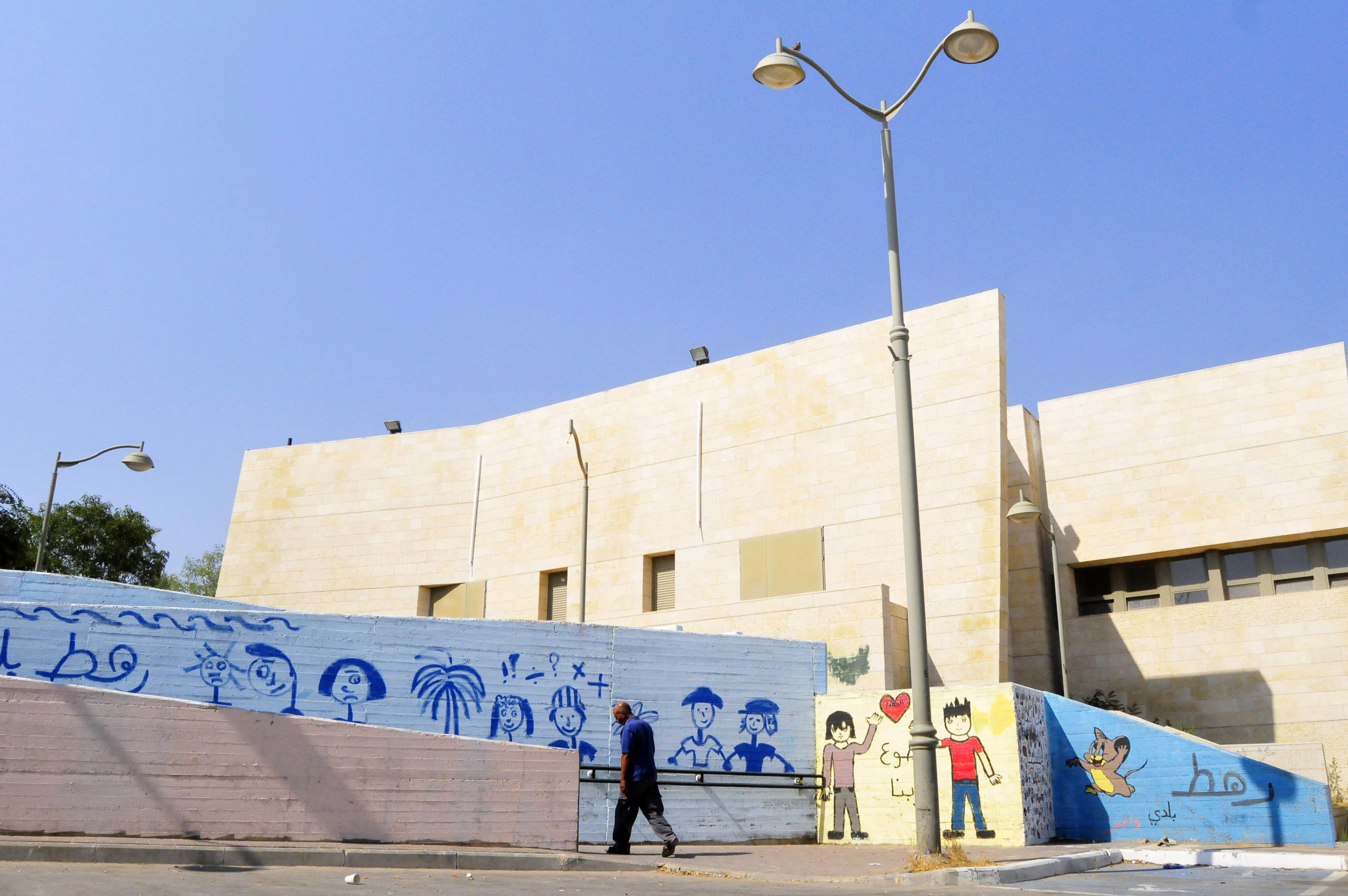
One of Rahat community centers

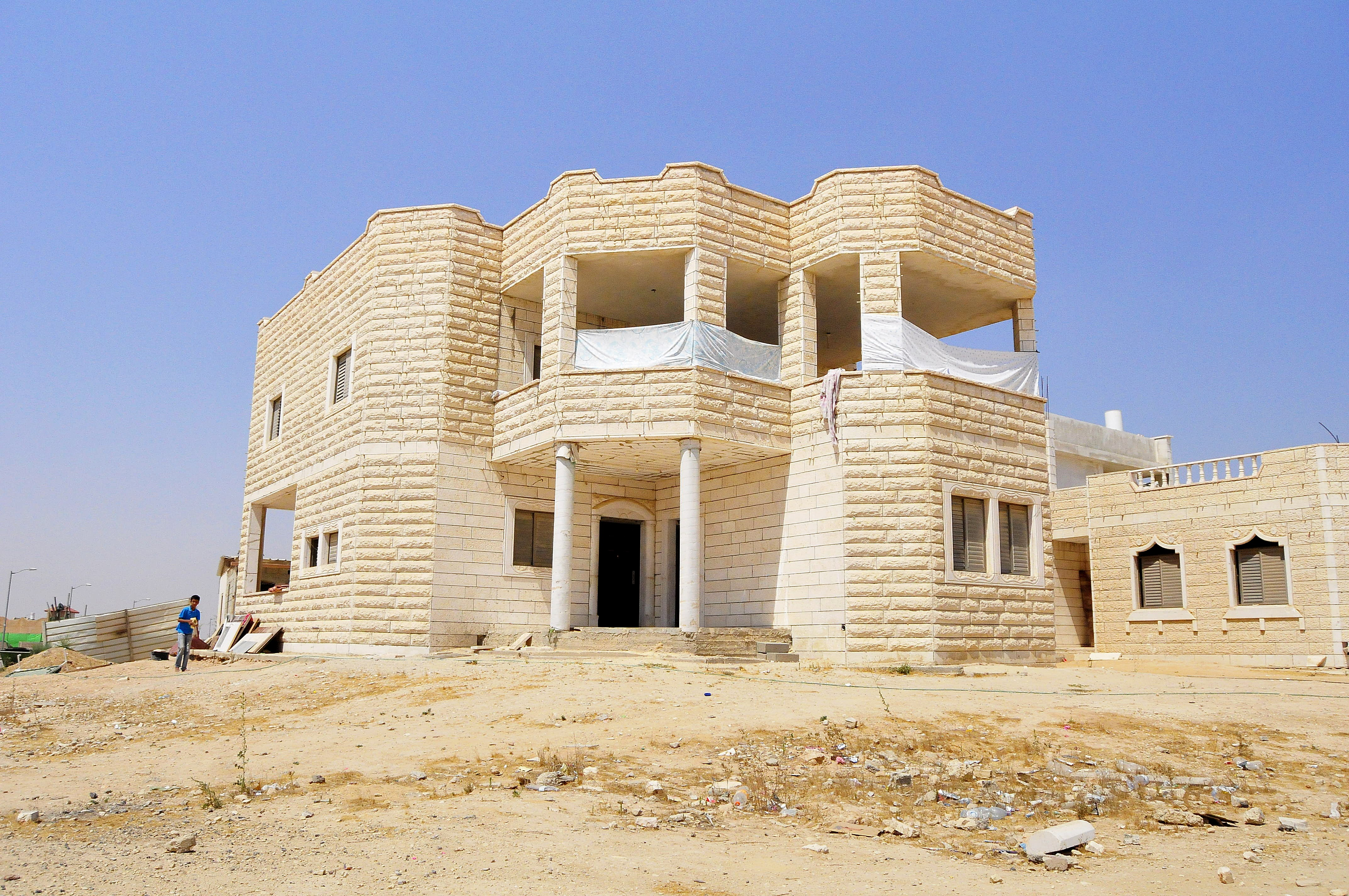
A private house in Tirabin al-Sana, a settlement of the Tarabin bedouin

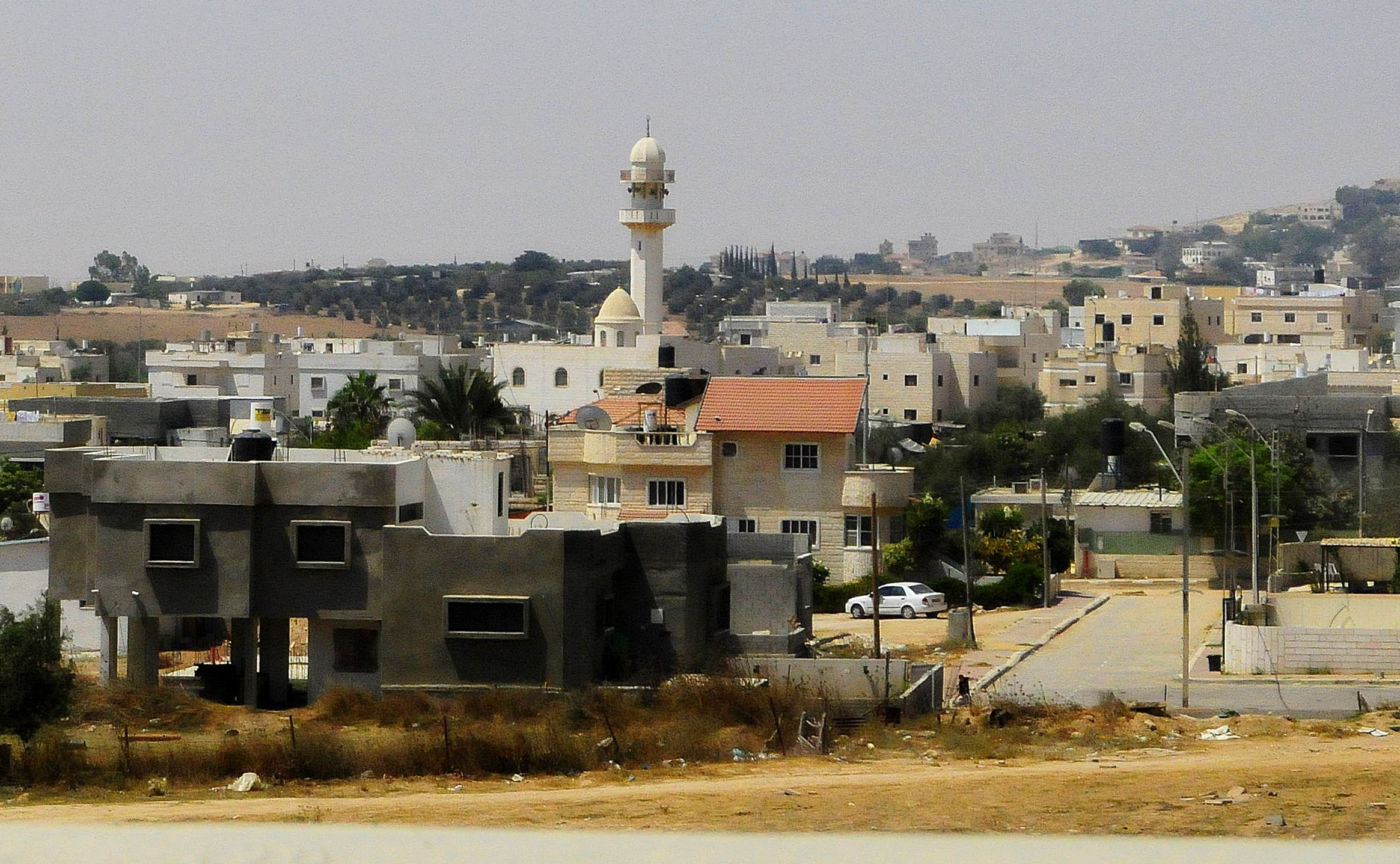
An entrance to the Bedouin village al-Sayyid

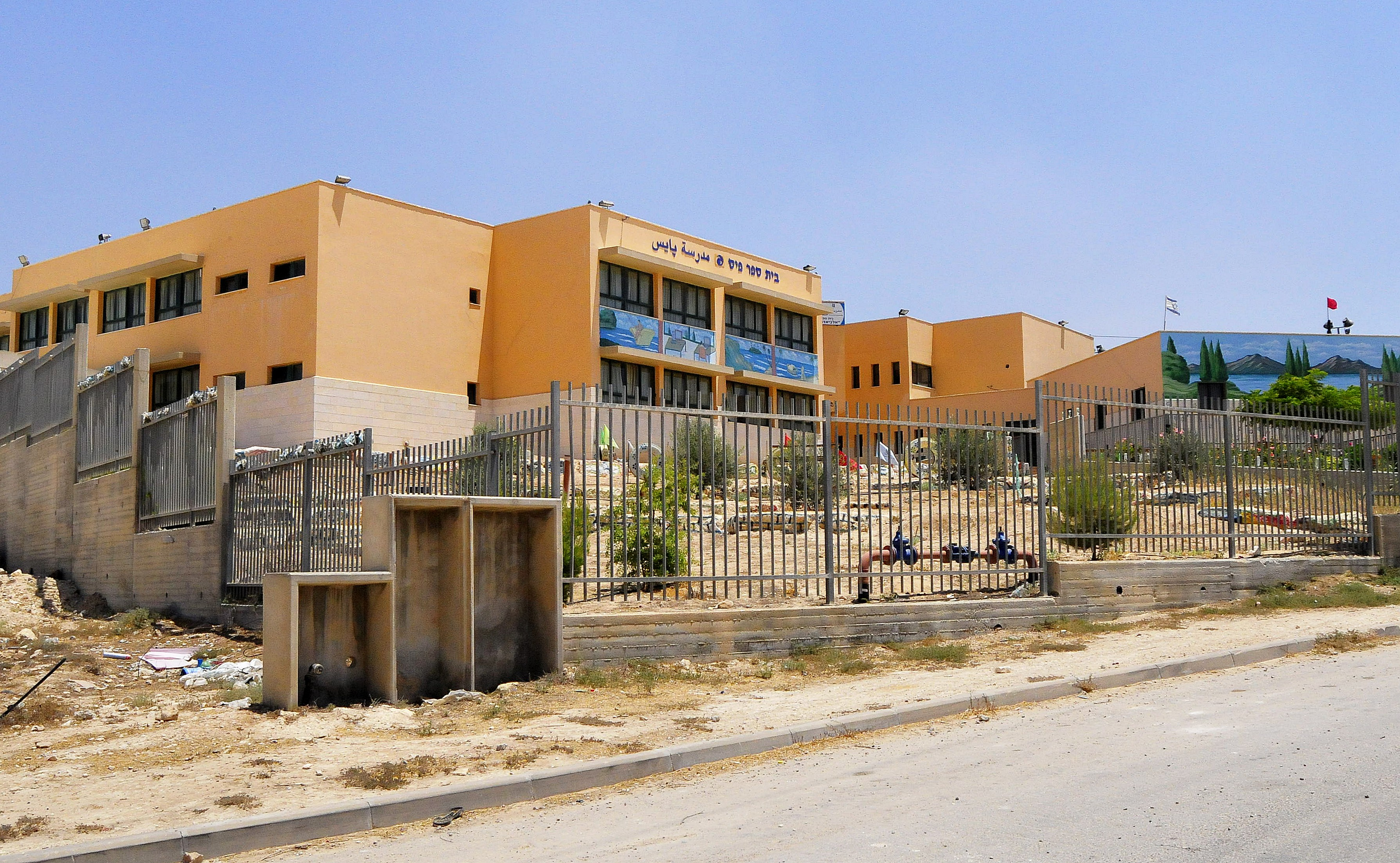
One of Hura's schools

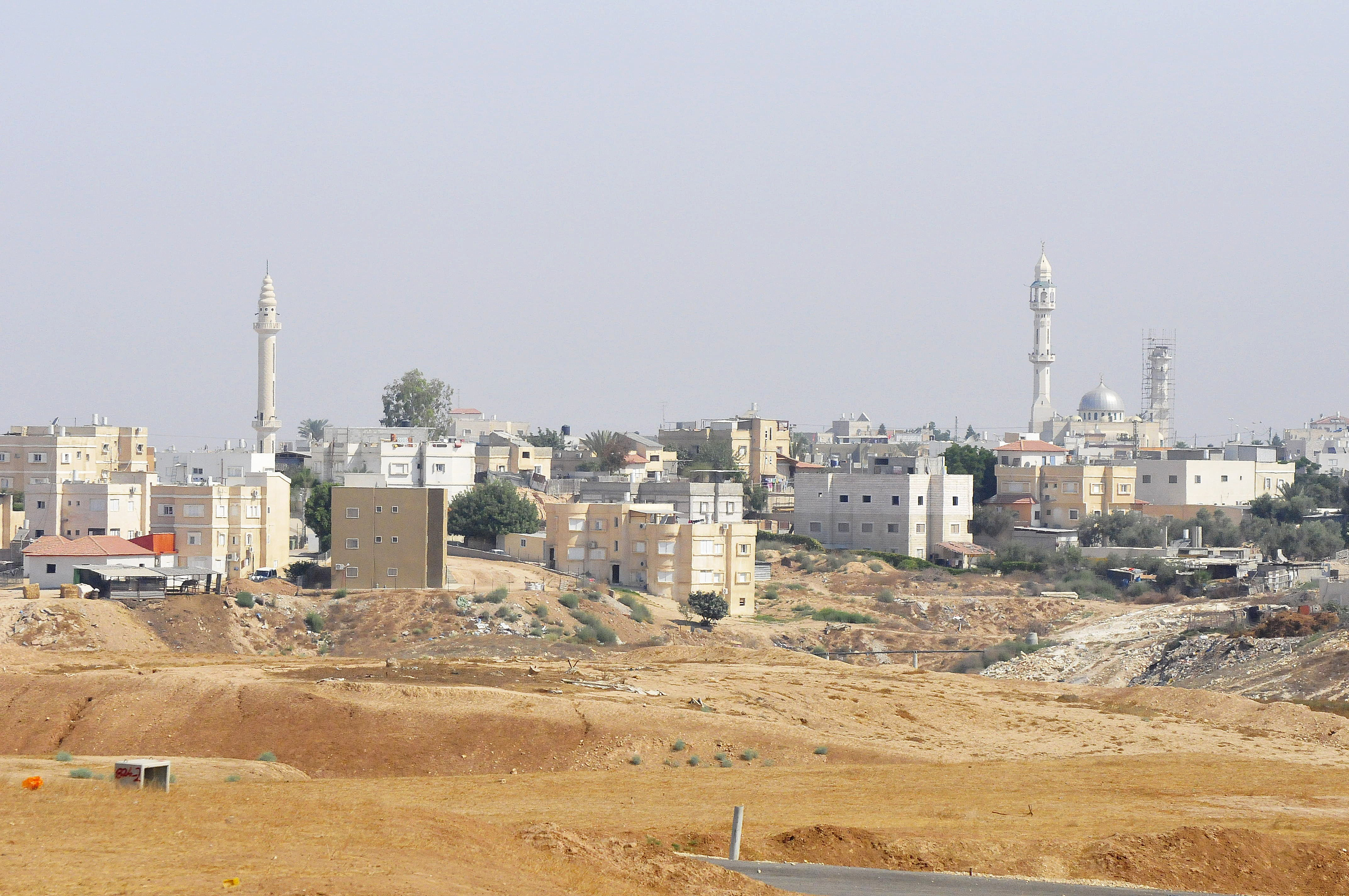
Rahat city view

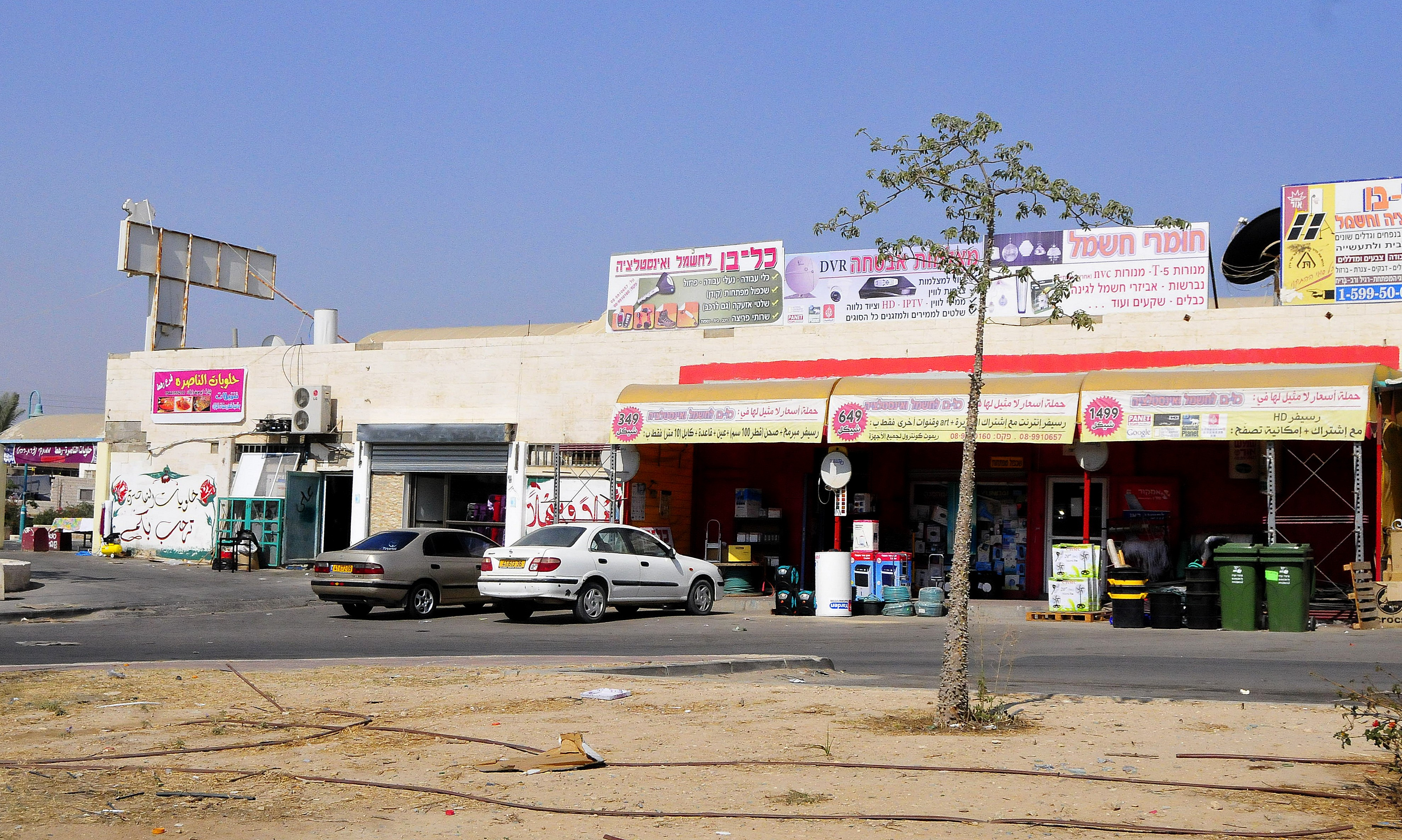
At the streets of Rahat

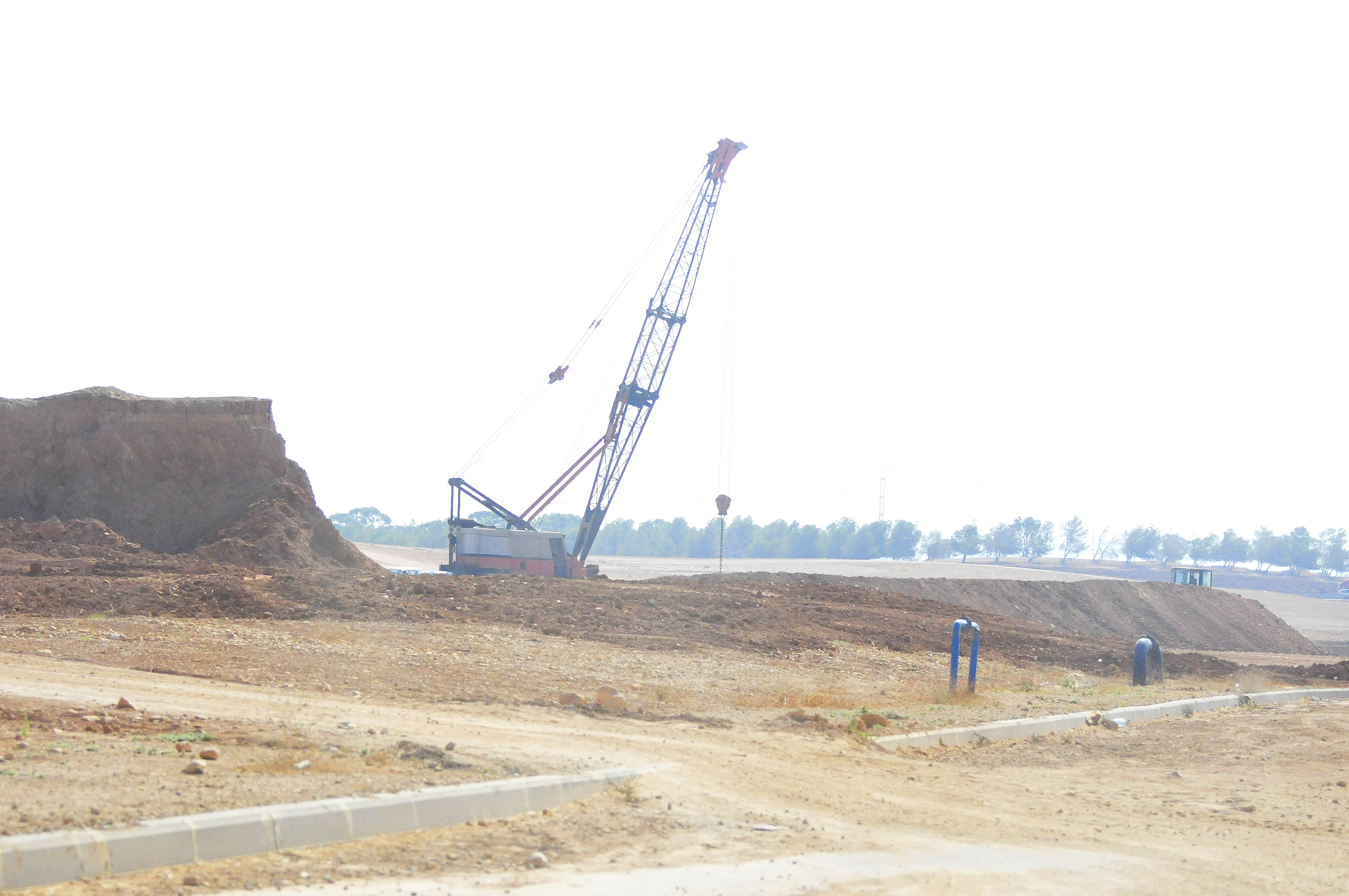
An industrial park Idan HaNegev being built in close proximity to Rahat

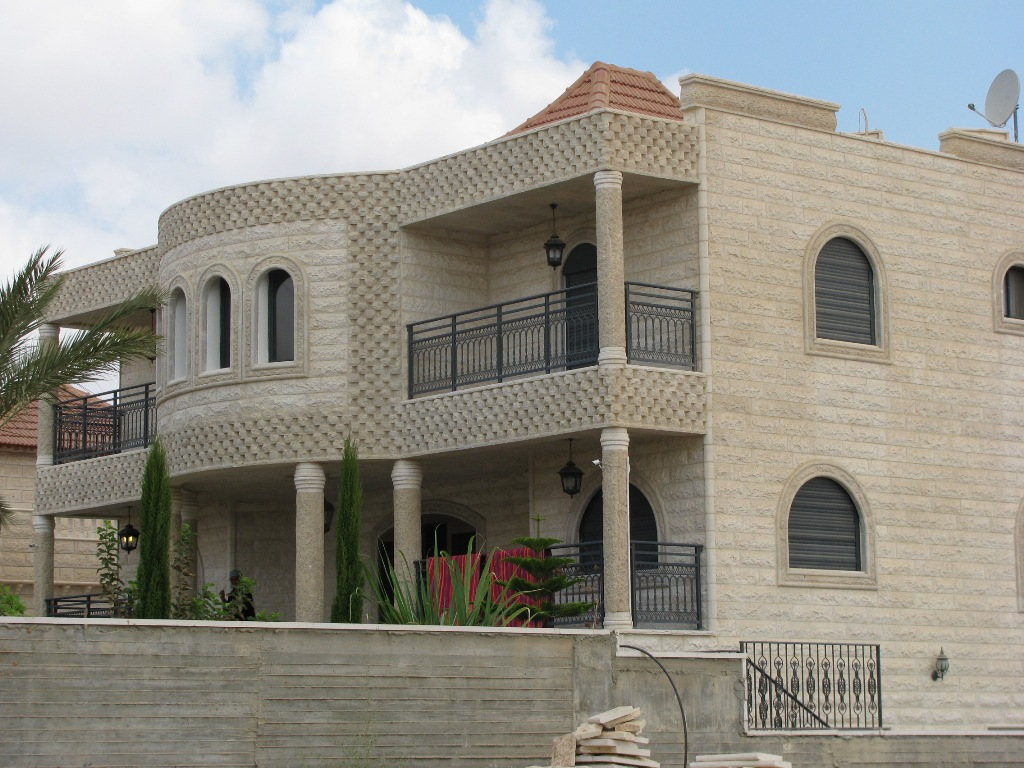
Private home in Segev Shalom

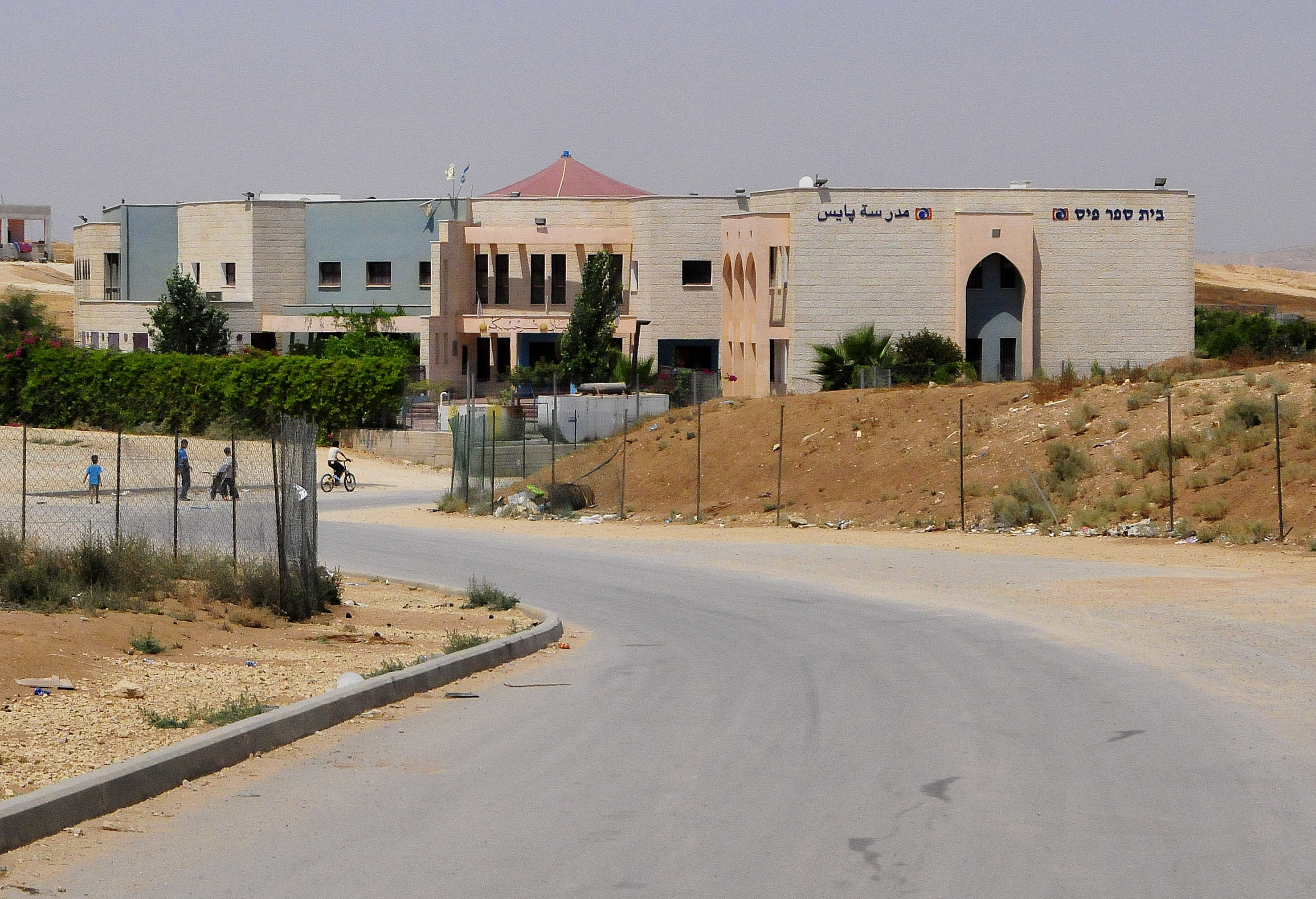
One of two al-Sayyid schools

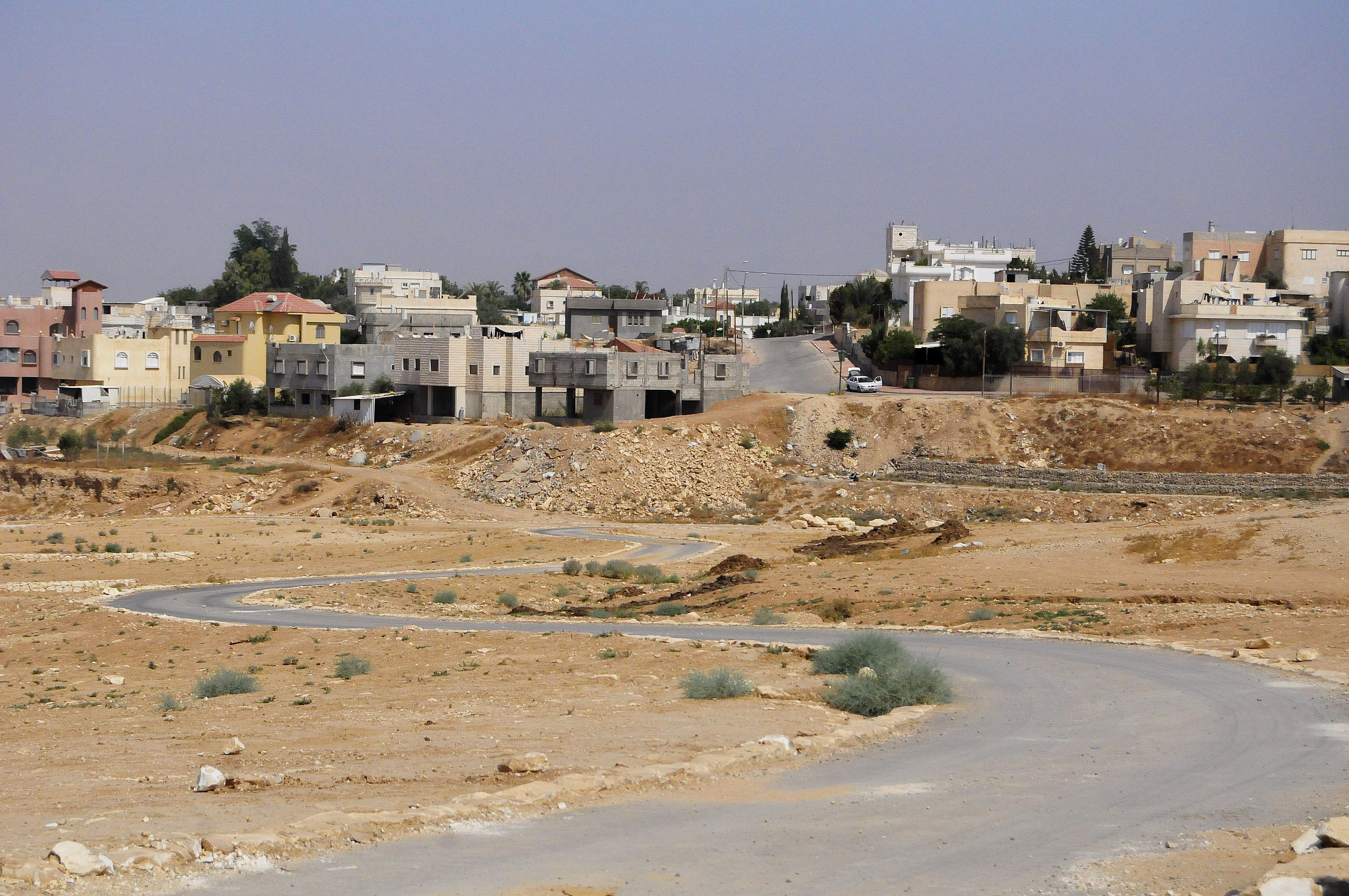
A view at Rahat from a new fast growing neighborhood Rahat haHadasha

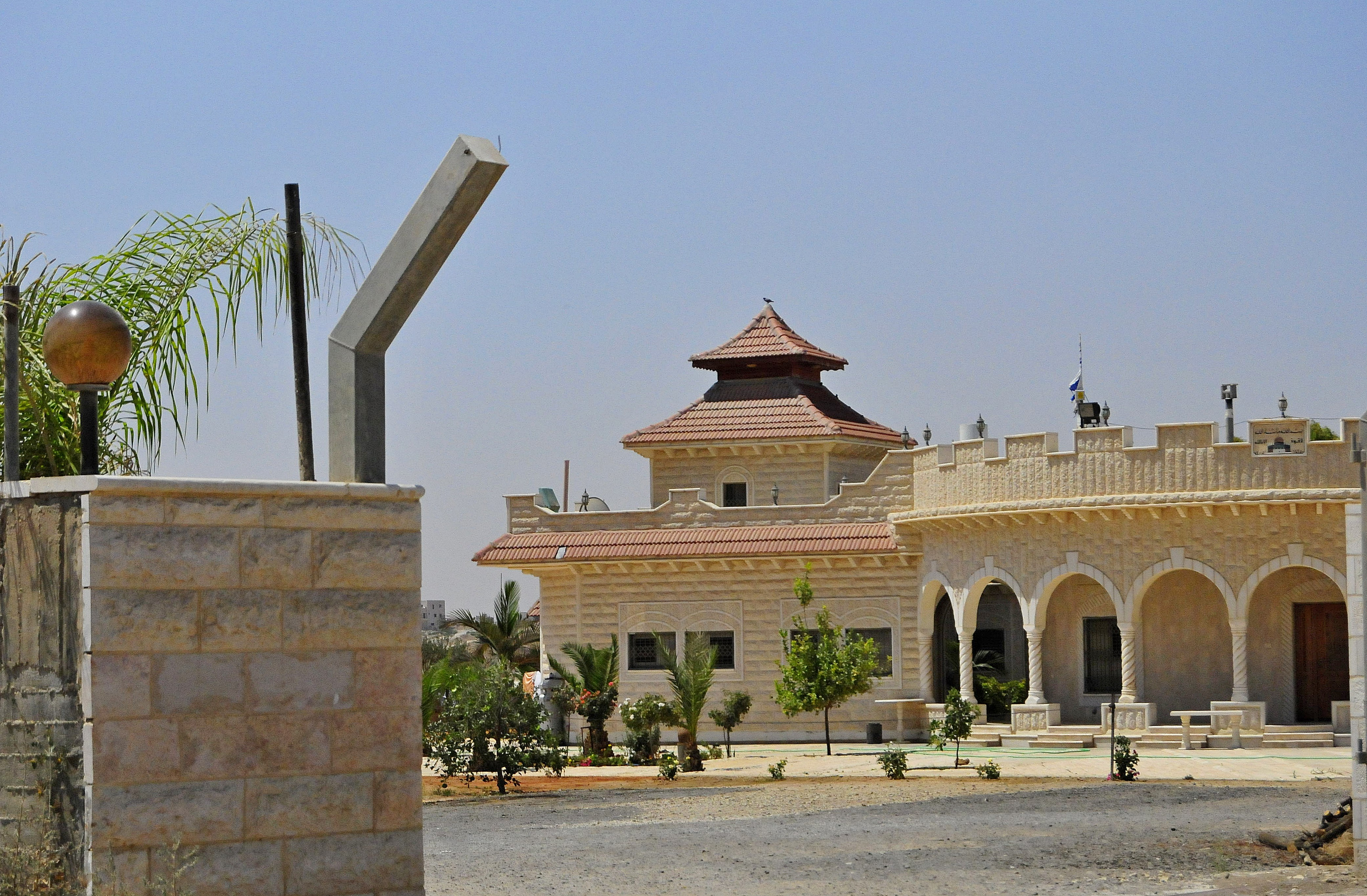
Private house in al-Sayyid

== See also ==
Related to

- Galilee Bedouin
- Palestinian Bedouin

Other

- Bisha'a, trial by fire, Bedouin lie detection ritual practiced in Judean, Negev and Sinai deserts
- Druze in Israel
- Transhumance
