= Wadi al-Na'am =

Coordinates: 31°9′48.19″N 34°49′19.75″E

- Unrecognized village
- Interactive map of Wadi al-Na'am
- Country: Israel

Wadi al-Na'am is an unrecognized Bedouin village in the Negev desert in southern Israel. The nearest official settlement is Beersheba. The village is home to about 5,000 Negev Bedouins who live mainly in tents and tin shacks less than 500 metres away from a toxic waste dump, largely surrounded by the Ramat Hovav industrial zone and military areas including an Israel Defense Forces live-fire range. Because the village is unrecognized, it is ineligible for basic services and subject to periodic house demolitions, even though the inhabitants hold Israeli citizenship.

== History ==
After 1948, the new state of Israel declared 85% of the desert "state land". From this point on, all Bedouin habitation and agriculture on this newly established state land was retroactively considered illegal. Negev lands the Bedouin had inhabited upwards of 500 years (but which they had not registered with the Ottoman or British governments; see Negev Bedouin) was rendered off-limits to Arab herders and Bedouin in the region were no longer able to fully engage in their sole means of self-subsistence – agriculture and grazing. The government then forcibly concentrated these Bedouin tribes into the Siyag (Arabic for 'fence') triangle of Beersheba, Arad and Dimona. Throughout the 1950s the government pushed Bedouin tries into this 'fence,' less than 1% of former Bedouin range. Within this fence, because the Bedouin never registered their holdings on paper, their villages were also considered illegal, and termed "unrecognized". Throughout the 1950s, like all other Bedouin tribes under Israeli jurisdiction, the 'Azazme were displaced from their land holdings into the Siyag triangle. The Israeli government settled about half of the tribe in the area now known as Wadi al-Na'am. Today, at least 75,000 citizens live in 40 unrecognized villages, among which Wadi al-Na'am is the largest.

In the 1970s, the government began to build urban townships, encouraging the Bedouin to move from dispersed locales through the Siyag, promising services. About half of the Bedouin moved. However, the towns were unplanned, and the Bedouin who moved to them found that there were no economic opportunities in or around the towns. The townships rapidly turned into ghettos rife with crime and drugs. At the same time, the urbanized Bedouin no longer had access to their former grazing lands. Most became dependent on government 'social security' in order to survive.

As the nation developed and extended electricity and water access throughout the Negev, Israeli citizens living in unrecognized villages like Wadi al-Na'am were denied access to national electricity, water, and municipal trash services, The villagers of Wadi al-Na'am came to live under high-voltage electric pylons which provide electricity throughout the northern Negev. Many residents started to use toxic, noisy, expensive generators, out of their own pocket; some use solar power. The Israeli government built the regional water tank and electrical grid station in Wadi al-Na'am, but the residents were denied access.

=== Ramat Hovav toxic waste facility ===
In 1979, Ramat Hovav, Israel's hazardous waste disposal facility, was built on Wadi al-Na'am village grounds. Most of the men of Wadi al-Na'am sought employment within the new Ramat Hovav Industrial Area. The Ramat Hovav toxic waste facility was privately run and unregulated, and the facility immediately developed a history of accidents and closures. Within its first year, the Ministry of Health ordered the closure of the site. Two years later a government corporation took over company management, but under government management the site fared badly. Ramat Hovav regularly caught fire, injuring workers and shepherds, sheep, donkeys or soldiers stationed nearby, and wafting a toxic cloud over Wadi al-Na'am and Beersheba. When an explosion occurred in 1997, Wadi al-Na'am residents were not warned and it took days before they were evacuated. Such explosions have continued annually. Nearly ten years after its establishment, the foundation under Ramat Hovav fractured, potentially leading to serious soil and groundwater contamination in the future.

Residents began to suffer extreme health concerns as a result of proximity to Ramat Hovav. The village began to endure unusually high rates of miscarriages and children were increasingly born with an array of eye, teeth, joint and respiratory problems, as documented by the Ben Gurion University Center for Women's Health Studies and Promotion as well as by Physicians for Human Rights-Israel.

In 2003, the Arab-Jewish environmental justice organization BUSTAN worked with local leaders to develop a health clinic out of sustainable materials in order to draw international attention to the issue of indigenous rights & toxic waste in the region. Key leaders included: BUSTAN founder Devorah Brous, Bedouin Shaykhs Labad and Ibrahim Abu Afash, Wadi al-Na'am spokesman Najib Abu-Gharbiyeh, and partners at the Regional Council of Unrecognized Villages. Following clinic construction, 22 Jewish and Bedouin doctors and 87 professional volunteers from the Eden Association offered daily services until 2006. In 2004, after decades of contamination in the village and advocacy efforts for health services, the government built a clinic on the other side of the village. (Once the project succeeded in bringing regular government health services into the village, the clinic building came to be used by the Bedouin youth organization Ajeec for informal education activities; previously the youth group met in a tin shack unsuitable for the desert climate.)

== Options for action ==
Wadi al-Na'am is the only unrecognized village that has agreed to move from its current location. However, Wadi el'Na'am residents refuse to move into a government township, saying that the government has failed to show evidence of incorporating the lessons of the urban ghettos built in the 1970s; newly planned townships, like those built in the 1970s, do not feature any business districts, and no permits for Arab-owned industrial zones have been dispensed. Thus due to the lack of economic prospects in urban townships, few of the Bedouin in unrecognized villages (who are still able to maintain a degree of self-sufficiency in the unrecognized villages through illegal grazing and agriculture) see the urban ghetto as a desirable form of settlement. Despite the health hazards of residing in the area, Wadi Na'am village Shaykhs Labad and Ibrahim Abu Afash say they will not agree to move their tribe unless they are offered compensation in the form of suitable land rights. For residents this means an agricultural settlement not dissimilar to that in which Israeli citizens in Moshavim live. However no Arab village in the Negev has received permission from the government for agricultural activities as yet.

=== Leadership ===
Ibrahim Abu Afash and Labad Abu Afash are the Shaykhs of Wadi al-Na'am. They often work with Israeli and international human rights advocates to bring attention to the problems of unrecognized villages and toxic waste on indigenous lands. Najib Abu Gharbiyeh has also been a longtime spokesperson for the village.

== See also ==
- Negev Bedouin
- Unrecognized Bedouin villages in Israel
  - Al-Araqeeb
  - Tel Arad, Israel
- Category:Society of Palestine
