= Regional Council of Unrecognized Villages =

Political advocacy group formed in 1997

The Regional Council of Unrecognized Villages of Negev (RCUV) is a political advocacy group that was established in 1997. It represents the interests of the Bedouin population living in the unrecognized dispersed communities in the Negev Desert in southern Israel.

== Structure ==
This political advocacy group was created due to the need of the residents of the unrecognized Bedouin communities to promote their interests within the Israeli political system. Members of these communities belong to no municipalities of their own, and thus cannot elect representatives.

The Regional Council for the Unrecognized Arab Villages in the Negev (RCUV) is a grassroot civil society organization and a democratically elected body, chosen to represent the Bedouin community of the 45 unrecognized villages in the Negev. This population has been denied any representation in the local authorities, through the policies of non-recognition. The residents of each village elect a local committee, who become members of the general assembly of the RCUV. The general assembly elects the chairperson and the executive committee once every 4 years.

There are 240,000 Bedouin in the Negev, of these 50% live in UV. Non recognition means that there are no national infrastructures: running water, electricity, roads and more. This situation requires the residents of the UV to provide these facilities for themselves.

Israel refuses to recognize these localities for several reasons. The main reason is the planning issue—the state would like to see the Bedouin living in the planned settlements, like Rahat and Hura. However, most of the unrecognized villages are dispersed far apart and are situated in unsuitable places, e.g., military fire zones, natural reserves, landfills, etc. Another reason is an extremely high number of land ownership claims filed by the Bedouin making it impossible to recognize all of them. Negev Bedouin claim the ownership of land totaling some 600,000 dunams (600 km^{2}; 230 sq mi), or 12 times the size of Tel Aviv. Ultimately, the state does want to recognize as many of these unrecognized settlements as possible and build infrastructure in them.

In 1997 inhabitants of these localities who felt the need for a representative community-based organization founded the RCUV. Then the 45 participating dispersed localities had a total population of 76,000 inhabitants; these communities range in size from 500 to almost 5,000 residents. The RCUV is supposed to be an elected body, and the residents of each community (village) elect a local committee of 3-7 persons, who become members of the general assembly of the RCUV. The general assembly democratically elects the chairperson and the executive committee once every 4 years. To this day, the RCUV is the only body which seeks to represent the interests of residents of the unrecognized villages.

The primary goal of the RCUV is unconditional governmental recognition of the Arab Bedouin (governmentally unrecognized) villages in the Negev, which have been completely excluded from any form of governmental support or recognition. The RCUV also initiates and implements development programs; lobbies for civil rights; and advocate for the needs of its constituency. Without the RCUV there would be no such body to ensure that the basic needs and human rights of the Negev Bedouins are met.

== History ==
Negev Bedouins were originally a nomadic society engaged in herding, agriculture and sometimes fishing. Traditional Bedouin lifestyle began to change after the French invasion of Egypt in 1798. At the end of the 19th century, following the need to establish law and order in the Negev, the Ottoman Empire started forcing sedentarization of the Bedouins.

In 1858 a new Ottoman Land Law was issued that offered the legal grounds for the displacement of the Bedouin. Under the Tanzimat reforms the Ottoman Land Law of 1858 instituted an unprecedented land registration process. Few Bedouin opted to register their lands with the Ottoman Tapu, due to lack of enforcement by the Ottomans, illiteracy, refusal to pay taxes and lack of relevance of written documentation of ownership to the Bedouin way of life at that time.

It was a fatal mistake since Israel has inherited and mainly implemented the Ottoman Land Law as the only preceding law frame. While determining the land ownership Israel relied mainly on Tabu recordings whereas most of the Bedouin land fell under the Ottoman class of 'non-workable' (mawat) land and thus belonged to the state under Ottoman law. Moreover, Israel nationalized most of the Negev lands, using The Land Rights Settlement Ordinance from 1969.

Israel's policies regarding the Negev Bedouin at first included regulation and re-location. During the 1950s Israel has re-located two-thirds of the Negev Bedouins into an area that was under a martial law. Bedouin tribes were concentrated in the Siyagh (Arabic for "the permitted area") triangle of Beer Sheva, Arad and Dimona. In 1966 they were given Israeli citizenship and the state has started to build planned townships for them.

=== Government-planned townships ===
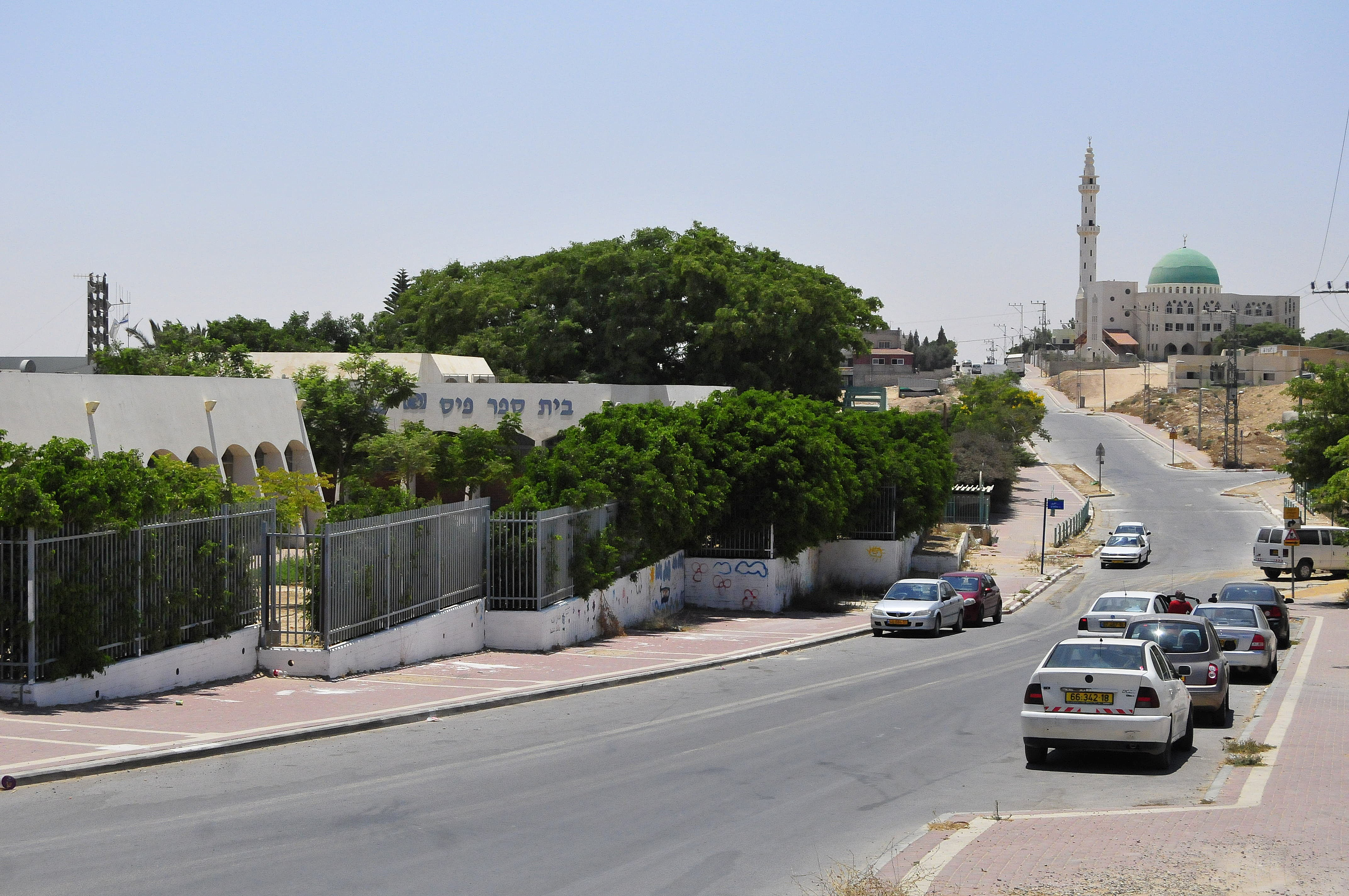
Government-planned Bedouin township Hura's downtown

Between 1968 and 1989 Israeli government established urban townships especially for the Bedouin tribes of the Negev. Within a few years, half of the Bedouin population moved into the seven townships built for them. The largest Bedouin locality in Israel is the city of Rahat, it was established in 1971. Other towns include Tel as-Sabi (Tel Sheva) (established in 1969), Shaqib al-Salam (Segev Shalom) in 1979, Ar'arat an-Naqab (Ar'ara BaNegev) and Kuseife in 1982, Lakiya in 1985 and Hura in 1989. But not all the Bedouin desired urban life.

=== Unrecognized villages ===
Those Bedouin who resisted sedentarization remained in their old scattered villages which are not recognized by the Israeli government and are thus ineligible for municipal services such as connection to the electrical grid, water mains or trash-pickup. Some Bedouin insist on remaining in unrecognized villages in the hope of retaining their traditions and customs.

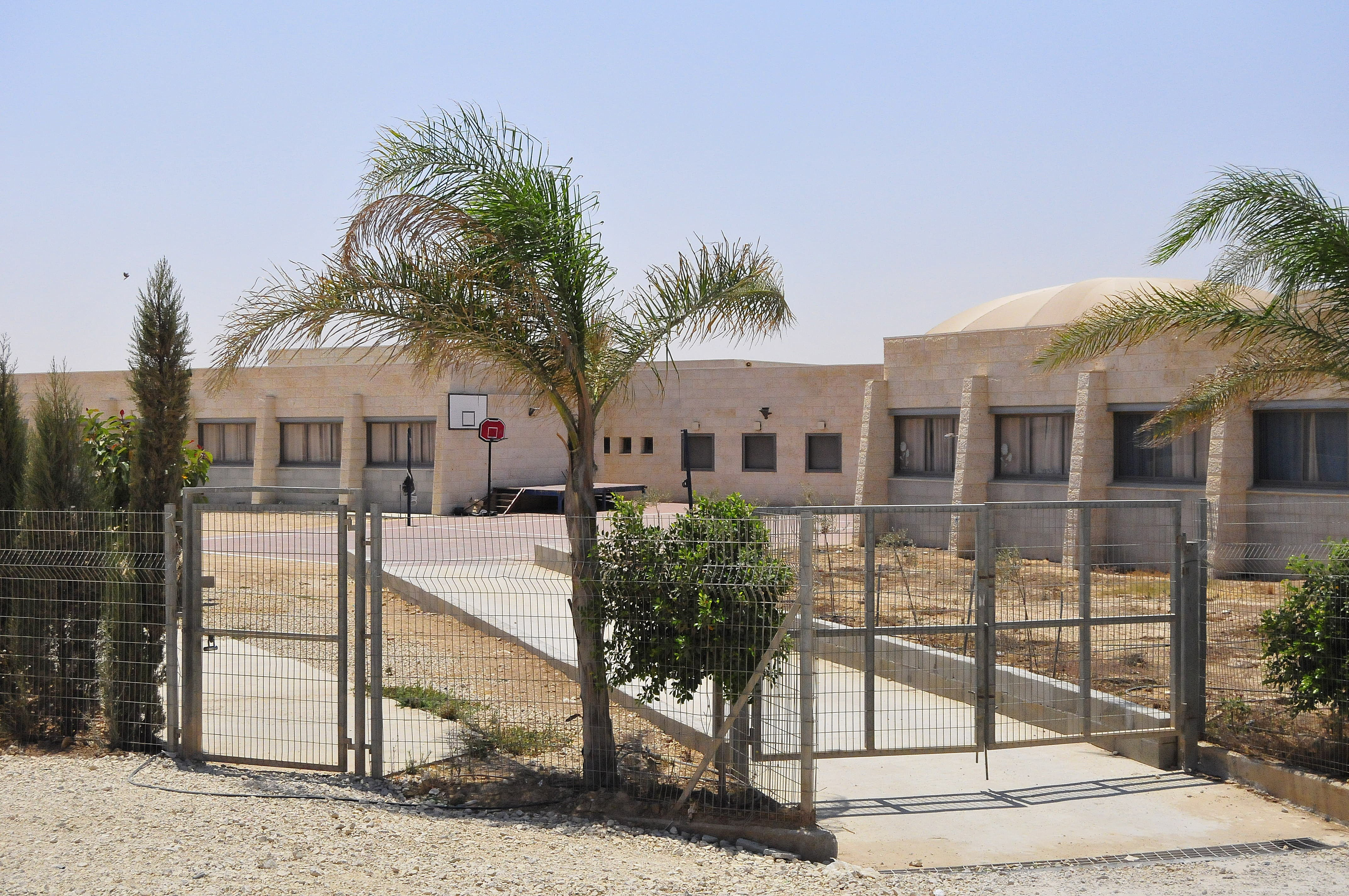
A newly built school in al-Sayyid

Many of the unrecognized Bedouin communities were created in the 1950s when the Israeli army resettled Bedouin from the Sinai desert. Construction in them was carried out sporadically, without any centralized planning, so, for example, no place was left for the community objects, such as schools, clinics or community centers.

Israeli government uses different means in order to attract the Bedouin into the planned settlements, both pleasant and unpleasant. For instance, it offers land lots at very attractive prices and different bonuses. But sometimes the state is forced to implement coercive measures. Following the court order and all the legal procedure it demolishes houses built illegally on what it considers to be state lands. This is done in order to implement law and order in the Negev, as well as to build new settlements both for Jews and for the Bedouin, and improve life conditions of the Bedouin by moving them to townships with a developed infrastructure.

The villages represented by the council are: A-Sayed, Abdeh, Abu Qrinat, Abu Tlul, Albqiaa, Al Baht, Al Behireh, Al Furaa, Al Ghara, Al Grein, Al Humra, Al Mazraa\ Jabel Daya, Al Mkimen, Al Rois, Al Sireh, Al-Ser, Al Zaarurah, Al Zarnuq, Al-Shahabi\ Abu-Tlul, Am Albdun, Am Ratam, Asadir, Atir – Im el-Hiran, Awajan, Baht al-Siraya, Bir el-Hamam, Bir el-Mshash, Bir Hadaj, Dahiye, Drijat, Elaraqib, Hashemzaneh, Hirbat al-Watan, Kaser a-Sir, Karkur, Kuhleh, Kurnub, Mackhul, Qatamat\ al Mathar, Rahameh, Ras Jeraba, Saaweh, Sawawin, Tarabin, Tel Arad, Tel el-Maleh, Um Alhiran, Um Batin, Um el-Mileh, Um Mitnan, Wadi el-Mshash/ Alshraiqiya, Wadi el-Naam, Wadi Halil.

== Formation ==
The RCUV was formed in the aftermath of 1996 events in the unrecognized village of Umm Batin. A group of local residents tried to resist government's demolition of houses built as a result of squatters' housing. During the relocation of the Bedouin and their active resistance three people were injured, including a child. Following this event, RCUV was created. It consisted of a local committee of traditional leaders joined by several "community professionals".

The founders of the RCUV soon after took on developing a "Plan for the Development of Municipal Authority for the Arab Bedouin of the Unrecognized Villages in the Negev", as an alternative to the Israeli government's standard approach to relocation of residents of the unrecognized villages against their will.

According to Human Rights Watch, when the Israeli Southern District Outline Plan (Tamam 4/14/2001) was first formulated, it completely ignored the existence and needs of the Bedouin in the unrecognized villages. After the Association for Civil Rights in Israel petitioned the Israeli Supreme Court in cooperation with the RCUV and the villagers it seeks to represent, the planning authorities acknowledged that Tamam had discriminated against the Bedouin.

In July 2001 government planners agreed to meet with community representatives. However, Human Rights Watch says this process dragged on for over seven years, and despite some improvements, in 2008 the Plan still ignored the needs of most of the unrecognized villages.

== Establishment of Abu Basma Regional Council ==
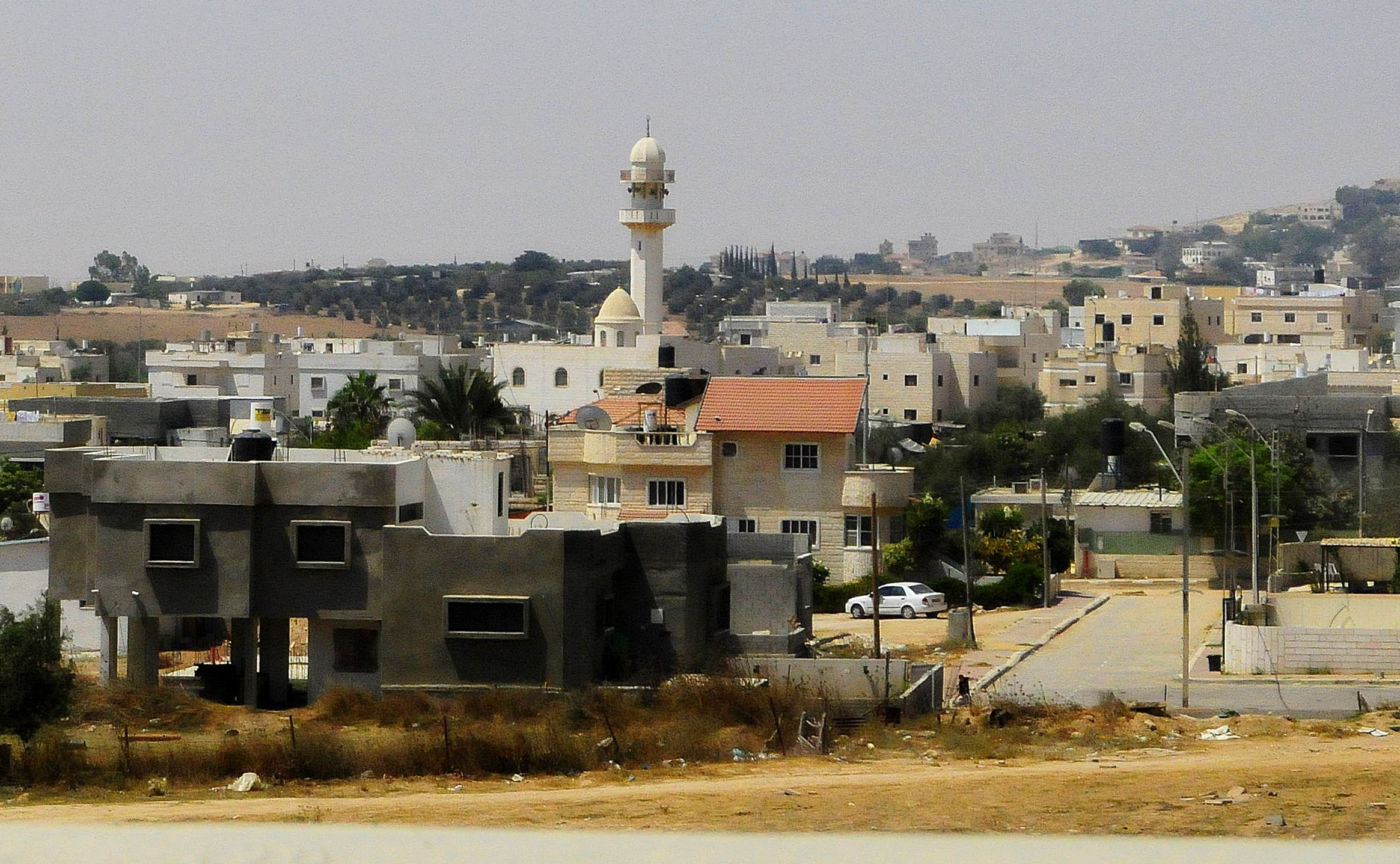
An entrance to the newly recognized village of al-Sayyid

Answering the housing need of the Negev Bedouin and as a part of the policy of step-by-step recognition of the unrecognized communities where it is possible, the State of Israel went on and initiated a creation of a new regional council whose sole purpose was to unite all the Bedouin communities that previously did not belong to other municipalities in order to solve their problems in a more organized way.

On September 29, 2003 Israeli government has adapted a new "Abu Basma Plan" (Resolution 881), according to which a new Abu Basma Regional Council was formed, unifying a number of unrecognized Bedouin settlements. This resolution also regarded the need to establish seven new Bedouin settlements in the Negev, literally meaning the official recognition of unrecognized settlements, providing them with a municipal status and consequently with all the basic services and infrastructure. The council was established by the Interior Ministry on 28 January 2004.

Moreover, Israel is currently building or enlarging some 13 towns and cities in the Negev. According to the general planning, all of them will be fully equipped with the relevant infrastructure: schools, medical clinics, postal offices, etc. and they also will have electricity, running water and waste control, but it takes time. Several new industrial zones are planned, some are already being constructed, like Idan HaNegev on the suburbs of Rahat. It will have a hospital and a new campus inside.

== Prawer plan ==
In September 2011, the Israeli government approved a five-year economic development plan called the Prawer plan. One of its implications is a relocation of some 30.000-40.000 Negev Bedouin from areas not recognized by the government to government-approved townships. This will require Bedouins to leave ancestral villages, cemeteries and communal life as they know it.

According to the PMO official press release, the plan is based on four main principles:

1. Providing for the status of Bedouin communities in the Negev;
2. Economic development for the Negev's Bedouin population;
3. Resolving claims over land ownership; and
4. Establishing a mechanism for binding, implementation and enforcement, as well as timetables.

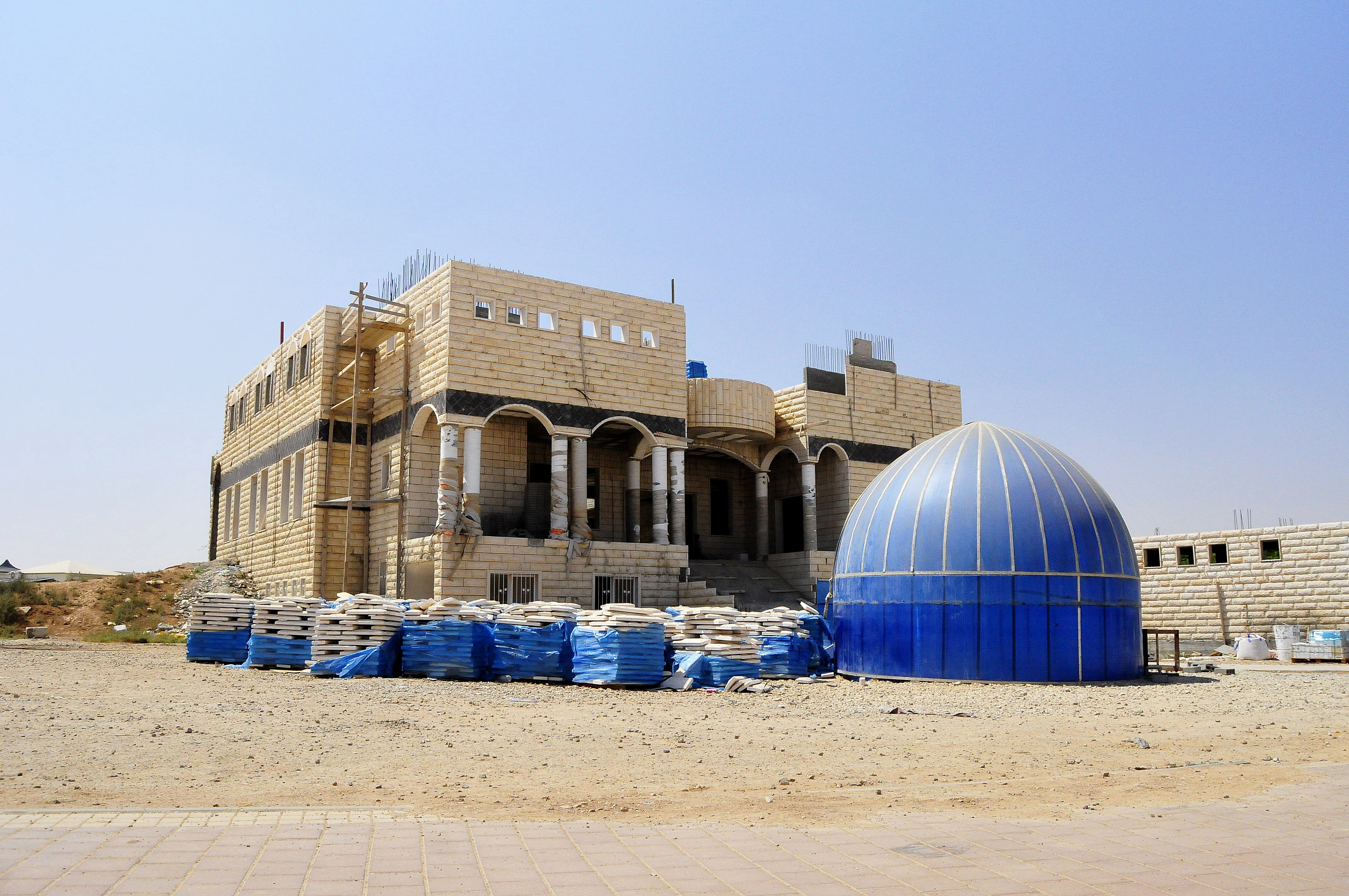
Tirabin al-Sana's mosque (its dome taken from mosque in the previous Tarabin tribe residence place next to Omer)

When the cabinet approved it, simultaneously it also approved a NIS 1.2 billion economic development program for Bedouin Negev whose main purpose is to support the Bedouin women and youth in the fields of employment since the Israeli government claims they will contribute to the increased economic growth of the entire Bedouin community. Much of the approved funds will be allocated for the development of industrial zones, establishment of employment centers and professional training. This claim has been resisted by Bedouin people.

According to the Prawer plan, the present Bedouin communities will undergo a comprehensive planning process. The existing communities will be expanded, some unrecognized communities will be recognized and start to receive public services, while their infrastructure will be renewed. All these changes will be done in the framework of the Beer Sheva District masterplan. Most residents will be absorbed into the Abu Basma Regional Council. While the government claims that the nature of these future communities, whether agricultural, rural, suburban or urban will be decided in full cooperation with the local Bedouin and that relocated people will receive new residences, many Bedouin people have found new homes unsustainable, destructive of their communities—and have been forced out of their homes.

The Prawer plan seeks to give an answer to numerous land claims filed by the Bedouin. It will offers significant compensation in land and funds - 50% of the claim (currently it's only 20% offered), while each claim will be dealt in a unified and transparent way provided by law.

It is feared by many that implementation of this plan will lead to forced relocation of the Bedouin from the unrecognized communities in spite of promises that the relocation is done in full coordination with the Bedouin and is voluntary.

Other Bedouin have also been removed with less popular criticism. Good examples in this matter are Tirabin al-Sana and Segev Shalom. After a number of complicated agreements with the state all of the Bedouin of Tarabin clan moved into a township built for them - Tirabin al-Sana. Following negotiations, the Bedouin of al-'Azazme clan will take part in the planning of a new quarter that will be erected for them to west of Segev Shalom township, cooperating with The Authority for the Regulation of Bedouin Settlement in the Negev.

== Current role ==
According to Maha Qupty (2004), a RCUV coordinator, the council builds community solidarity and mobilizes outside supporters to empower unrecognized villagers "to defend themselves against the onslaught of the State against their lands and livelihoods."

The RCUV seeks to address:

1. The government's treatment of 45 Bedouin villages as illegal "squats," and its residents as "trespassers";
2. The failure to extend municipal services afforded all other Israeli citizens;
3. The lack of community representation of the unrecognized villages in local councils, municipalities, planning and administrative bodies;
4. Protection from home demolitions, uprooting, land confiscation, and transfer; and
5. The Israeli national development plan and regional plans that ignore the existence of the villages.

In addition, the RCUV is working with the Abu Basma Regional Council to assure that villages which are de jure recognized by the government receive de facto recognition through government allowances for herding and agriculture, and the provision of services within a reasonable time frame.

In 2008, the Goldberg Committee, the government body assigned to assess the status and future of the unrecognized villages, reported its recommendations. No member of the RCUV or of the unrecognized villages was included on the panel of the Goldberg Committee. But the RCUV has worked to bring public pressure to bear on the Committee, from the outside.

On the contrary, implementation of the Prawer plan has started from the full cooperation of the government with the Bedouin and several important agreements were made between the Bedouin and the State.

== See also ==
- Unrecognized Bedouin villages in Israel
- Negev Bedouin
- Political advocacy

== External sources ==
- RCUV blog
- Government perspective on the Bedouin of the Negev
- Washington Report on Middle East Affairs
- Internal Displacement Monitoring Centre
- ZNet article on Devorah Brous, calling for government acknowledgement of the RCUV
- Lands of the Negev, a P.R. film prepared by Israel Land Administration on the official government perspective of challenges in the land management in Israel's southern Negev region
- Seth Frantzman, Presentation to Regavim about Negev
