= Al-Araqeeb =

Bedouin village in Israel

Al-Araqeeb قرية العراقيب
- Unrecognized village
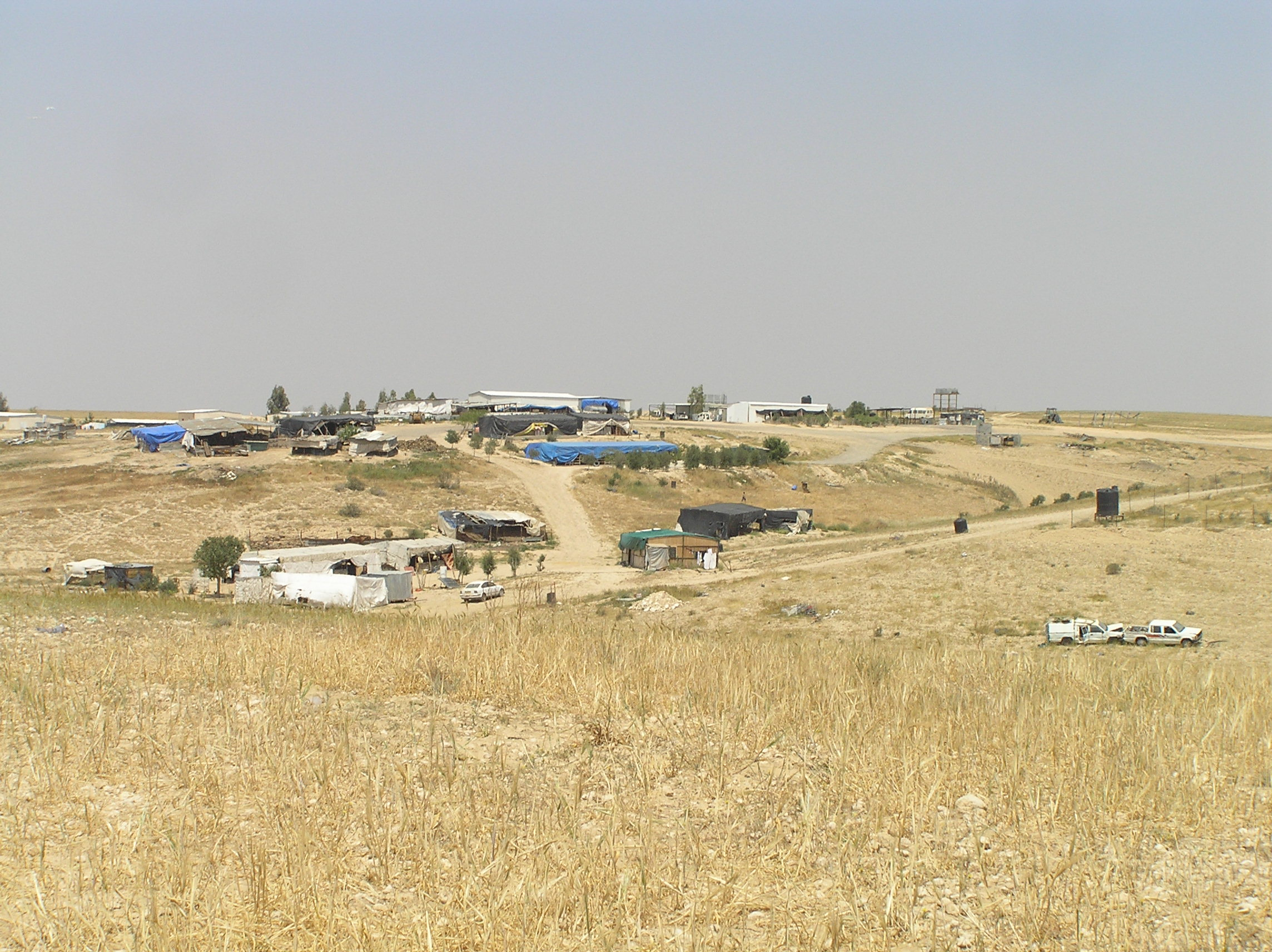
- Al-Araqeeb, 2010
- Interactive map of Al-Araqeeb
- Coordinates: 31°20′46″N 34°46′46″E
- Country: Israel

Al-Araqeeb (Arabic: قرية العراقيب, romanized: Qaryat al-‘Arāqīb; Hebrew: אל-עראקיב) is an unrecognized village of the Al-Turi Arab Bedouin tribe, five miles (8 km) north of Beersheba, demolished and rebuilt over 200 times.

== History ==
After the 1948 Arab–Israeli War, Israel began to displace the Bedouin of the Negev. By 1953, 90% of the roughly 100,000 Bedouin in the northern Negev were expelled. According to Eyal Weizman, the refugees moved to Gaza and the West Bank. The Bedouin from Al-Araqib ("Gentle Hills"), such as the al-Tūris and al-‘Uqbis, have fought to return to their ancestral lands.

The village lies on the 200mm RPA (rainfall per annum) line drawn by Israeli meteorologists on the basis of a schema developed by Wladimir Köppen to define cultivable land in the desert. Two archives were established to document the local Bedouin's rights to their land, one by Nūri al-‘Uqbi and another by Israeli geographer Oren Yiftachel. The At-Turi cemetery of the Al-Araqeeb Bedouin dates to 1914.

Israeli courts have rejected suits to reclaim this land, refusing to acknowledge Bedouin tenure south of the 200 mm line, which is reserved for kibbutz and moshav settlements. In 2012, an Israeli court turned down a suit by the al-'Uqbis to win their title based on a claim of continuous cultivation, recognized by the state.

The Jewish National Fund (JNF/KKL) planned to include the land of Al-Araqeeb in a forestation project in the Negev Desert called Ambassadors' Forest, honoring the assistance provided to Israel by the world's diplomatic corps. Some Bedouin living in Rahat and villages nearby objected to the plan. In July 2010 the village was demolished by 1,300 police officers, acting under orders of the Israel Land Administration.

After a six-year-long court case, in a precedent-setting ruling on March 15, 2012, the Beersheba District court ruled against the six lawsuits brought by the Al-Uqbi family, which claimed private ownership of land in the Al-Araqeeb area. Based upon the experts' testimony and the presented evidence, the judge ruled that the land was state-owned.

Disregarding the ruling, the Bedouin returned 59 times to rebuild the structures, but each time they were razed by the state. Aziz al-Touri, a representative of the village has asked why Jews are permitted to move to the Negev and live in kibbutzim, moshavim and isolated farms while that right is denied the Bedouin desiring to dwell in their own villages. The interviewers comment that the 1948 Palestinian exodus never ended.

== Land ownership ==
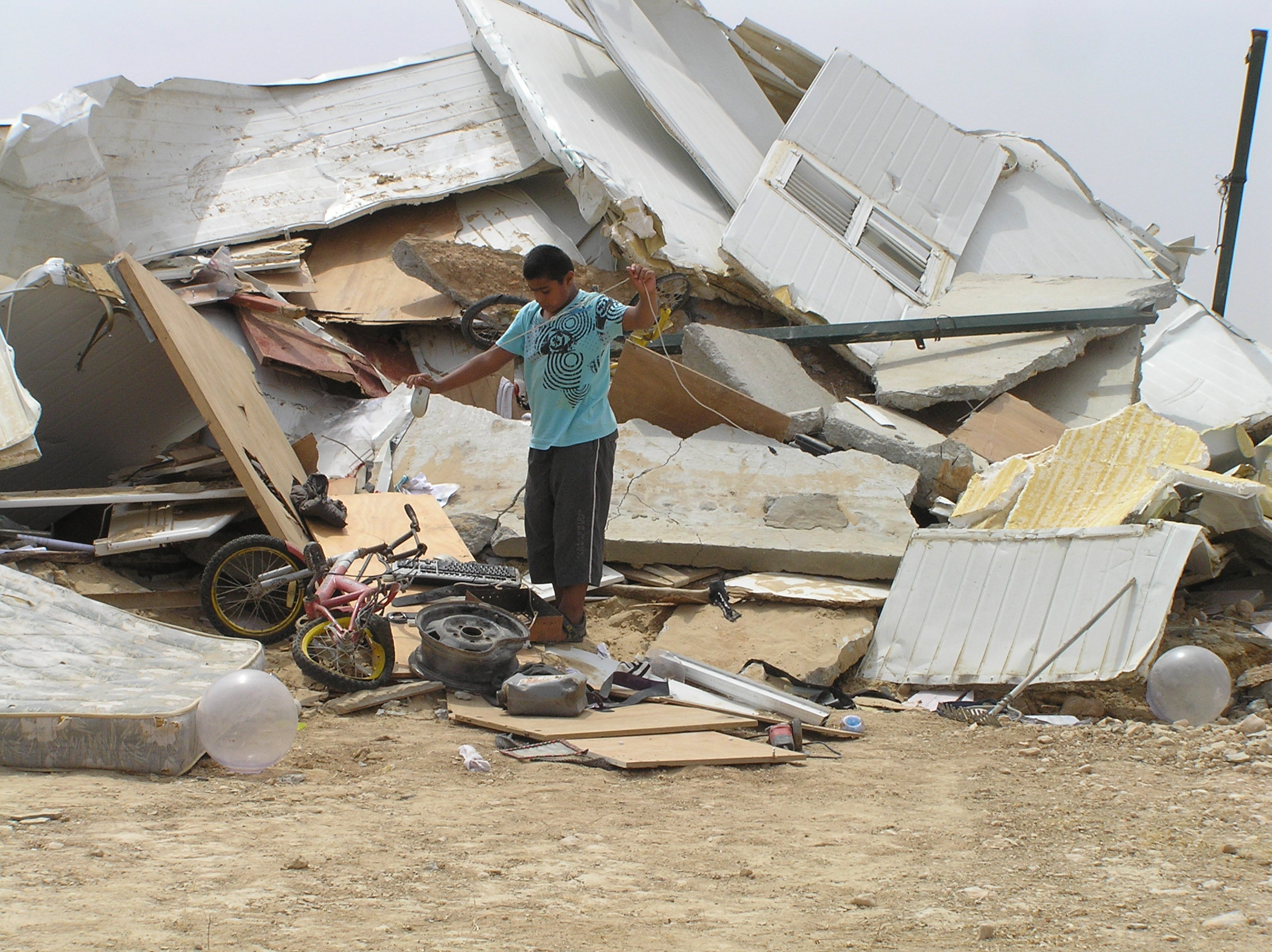
Demolished house in Al-Araqeeb

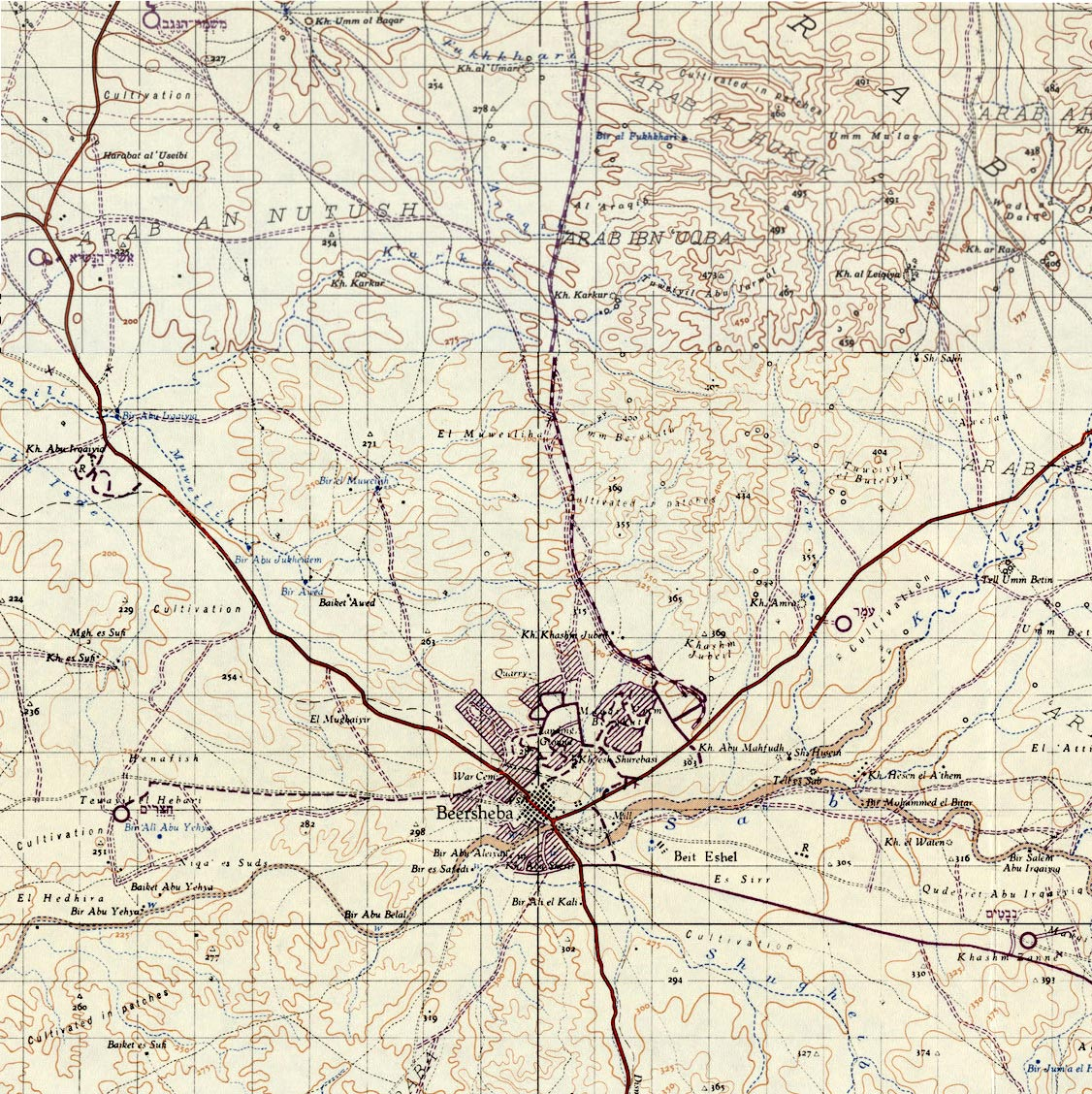
Map of the region surrounding the city of Beer Sheba in the 1940s depicting the location of al-Araqeeb tribe as 9 kilometers due north of the city

The Bedouin families of Arakib say they own about 4,600 acres of the Negev desert, and that they paid property taxes to the Ottoman Empire and later to the British Mandatory authorities in Palestine. Community leaders say they were forced by Israel's military into settlements along the border of the West Bank in 1951, and that they have been pushed off their land whenever they have since tried to return.

Israeli officials say the property was taken over by the state in the early 1950s because it was abandoned, and because its inhabitants were unable to produce deeds. They maintained that the Bedouins have been squatters who refused to pay rent; they cultivated land that did not belong to them, and were raising animals without livestock permits. Authorities claim that there has never been a permanent Bedouin settlement in the area. The Ottoman authorities permitted the clan members to graze their sheep and cows on this land, but did not give them ownership over it.

According to the Israel Lands Administration (ILA), Bedouins began illegally settling in the area in 1998, and several dozen families built homes in the area in 1999 when it appeared the government was attempting to seize the land. The ILA offered to rent the land for 2 NIS per dunam, but the inhabitants refused to pay and "continued to infiltrate the land year after year." In 2000, an Israeli court order banned the Bedouins from entering the area. The ruling was disregarded, as Bedouins continued to move into the area and plant trees. In 2003, the ILA secured a court order to evacuate the residents, and the case went to the Israeli Supreme Court. In 2004, though one resident speaks of crop dusters poisoning the fields in the later 1990s, the Israel Land Administration used crop duster fumigation to destroy the residents' wheat crops. This practice was outlawed by the court in 2007 after the Adalah legal center for Arab rights in Israel filed a petition to the Israeli Supreme Court on behalf of the residents of Al-Araqeeb and Wadi al-Bakar.

Tens of thousands of structures have been built in Bedouin communities, and new ones are built more quickly than the state can demolish them. They are illegal since the state never issues construction permits for the unrecognized villages.

In July 2011 the state filed a NIS 1.8 million suit against 34 Bedouins from the Abu Mediam and Abu Jabber families, whom they accuse of illegal encroachment on state lands. The suit seeks to reclaim the state costs of evicting families from the Negev village.

== Evictions ==
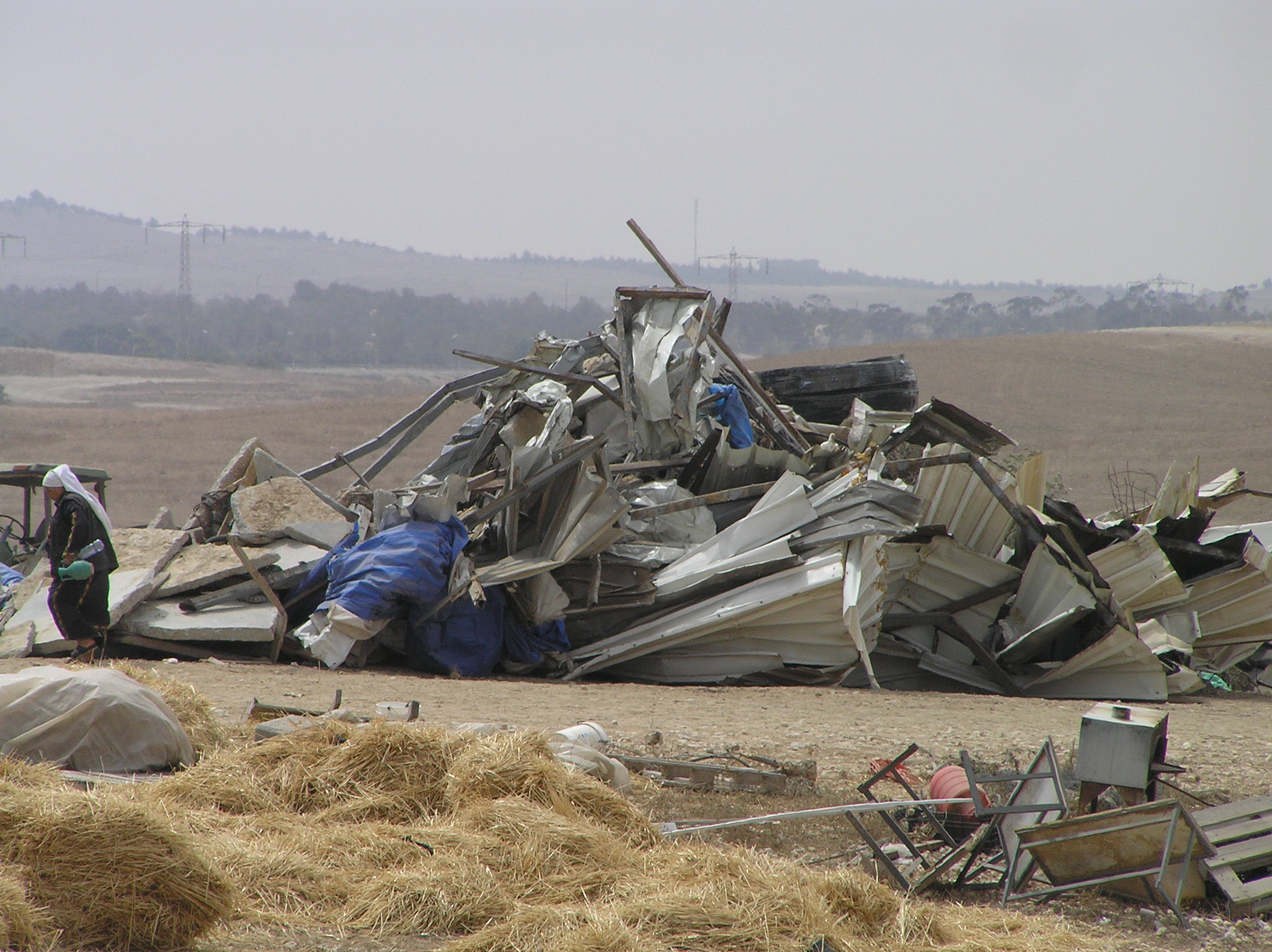
Demolished house in Al-Araqeeb, 2010

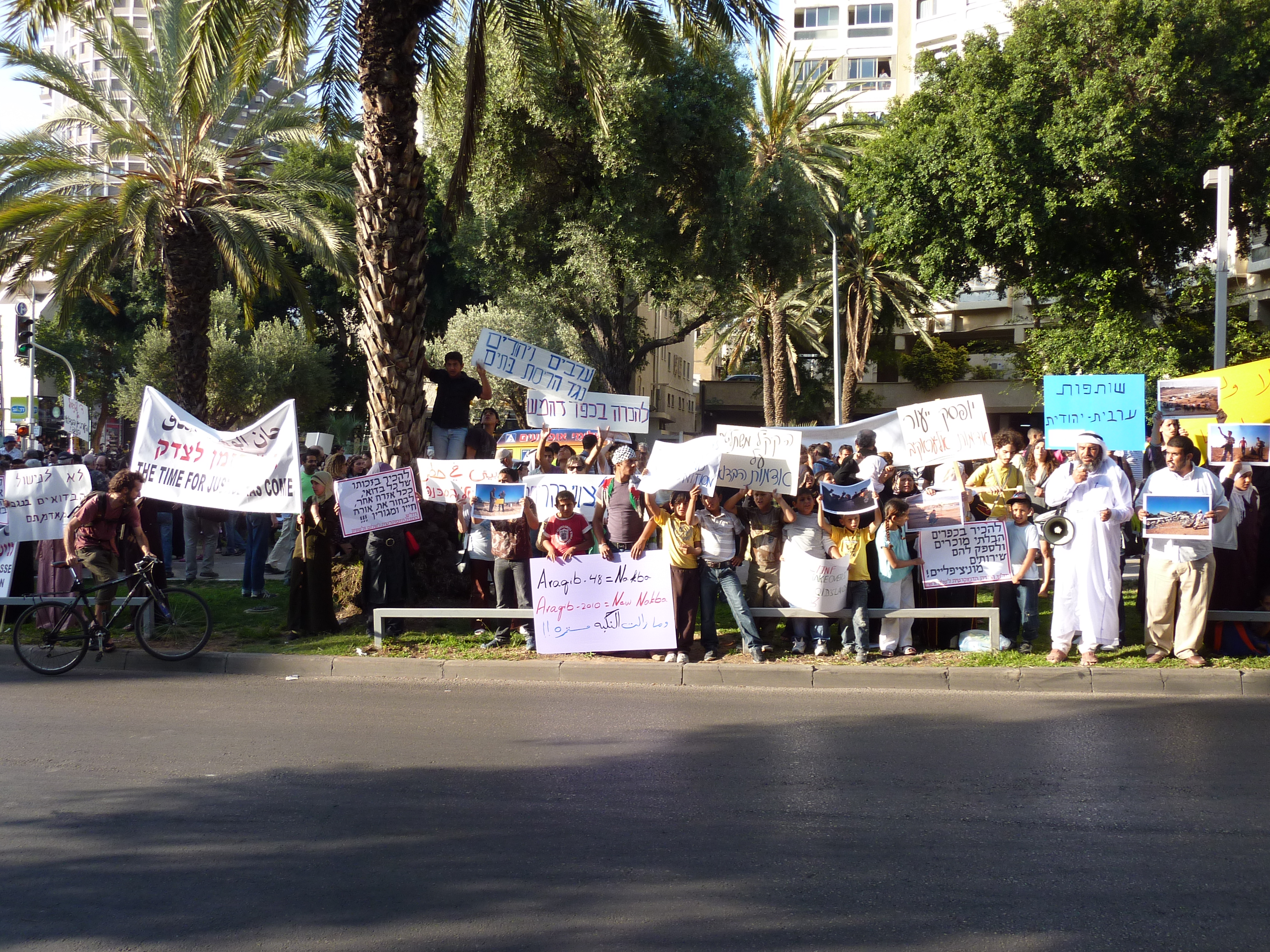
Bedouins demonstrating in Tel Aviv for the right to return to their village of Al-Araqib, 12 May 2010

In July 2010, Israel Land Administration inspectors and 1,300 police officers demolished the villages' 46 buildings and uprooted 850 trees, which were transferred for replanting elsewhere. Witnesses told CNN that the hundreds of Israeli riot police who stormed the village were accompanied by "busloads of cheering civilians". Israeli police said that there were "no disturbances". Hundreds of olive trees belonging to the villagers were uprooted. Israeli left-wing activists mildly clashed with police during the demolition.

Some residents immediately began rebuilding their homes. Shlomo Tziser, a Land Administration administrator told the press that, "the people who live here have homes in Rahat and Kfar Kassem. We are implementing a verdict for the evacuation of the area which has passed all legal instances. Today we shall evacuate them and should they return we'll do it again."

One week after the last demolition (August 4), the village was razed again after residents returned and rebuilt some parts of it. Six people were arrested during the second demolition of the village. The Bedouin Knesset member, Taleb el-Sana, was forcibly removed from the scene by police after he had tried to stop the demolition.

Over the next two weeks, the village was demolished a third (August 10) and a fourth time (August 17) after residents rebuilt it. The demolition on August 17 took place at dawn during Ramadan while the villagers were fasting. Throughout the following months, residents continued to return to the village and build makeshift structures.

On January 16, 2011, Israeli security forces demolished eleven makeshift buildings. Protesters clashed with police, who responded with pepper spray and paintball guns. Five protesters were injured. Taleb el-Sana attended and told Israeli media that, "The state is pushing its Bedouin citizens to the point where they may launch a popular intifada, which will have severe results." The inhabitants immediately returned to the site. The following day, police arrived at the site and evicted the residents, clashing with them and Israeli leftists. An Israeli police officer was injured by stones thrown at him, and police responded by firing paintballs at protesters, injuring one. Five people were arrested. On January 31, the village was again demolished, while police forces also guarded Jewish National Fund (JNF) forestation work in the area.

On February 10, 2011, clashes occurred again, after residents and activists disrupted the work of JNF forestry workers. Six people were injured and taken to Soroka Medical Center in Beersheba, and three villagers were arrested for throwing stones. On February 16, villagers again clashed with JNF workers and their police escorts. Police responded by firing paintballs. Two villagers were lightly injured and taken to Soroka Medical Center.

The Israeli authorities forcibly removed the residents of the village in September 2019, before demolishing all their homes and tents for the 162nd time.

On 7 June 2022, the village was demolished for the 202nd time since 2000, and the 6th time that year alone. On 29 August 2024, Al-Araqeeb was demolished for the 229th time; on 24 December 2025, it was demolished for the 244th time.

== Court findings ==
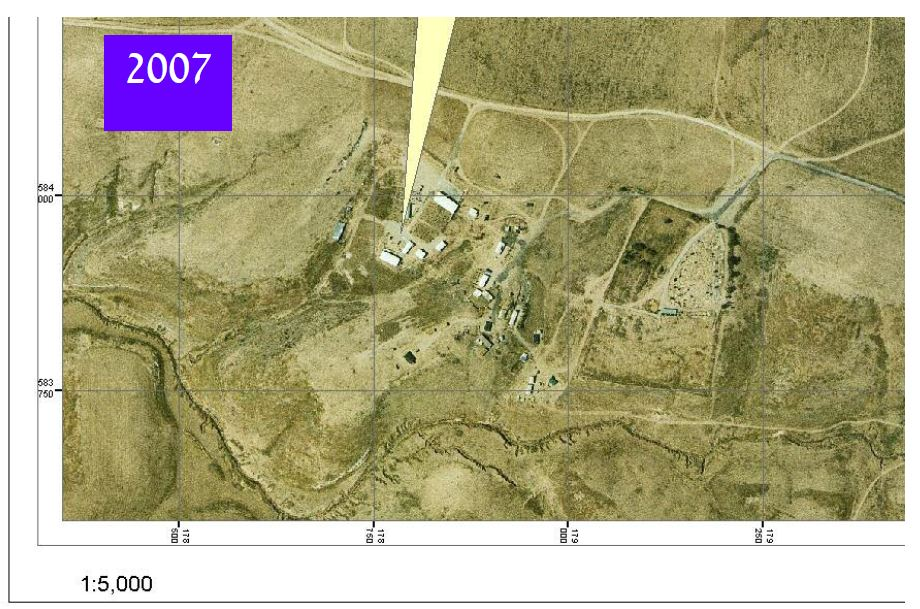
Aerial shot of Al-Araqeeb in 2007 presented by the state in court

In late 2006, seventeen Bedouin of the al-Uqbi family filed six land claims saying that the land they are on, including Al-Araqeeb, belongs to them. After five years of legal proceedings, the court heard extensive testimonies of experts and witnesses on the behalf of both sides, reviewed historical documents, and scrutinized land laws from the Ottoman period, the British mandate period and that of Israel. The country's leading experts in historical and political geography testified. For the plaintiffs spoke Ben Gurion University’s Prof. Oren Yiftachel, a critical geographer and a social scientist. Testifying for the state was Prof. Ruth Kark, a leading expert on the historical geography of Palestine and Israel from the Hebrew University.

The plaintiffs argued that the state order to expropriate the land in 1951 was made on the erroneous assumption that under Ottoman law, the land was classified as Mawat (uncultivated and not adjacent to settled lands). They said that the land had been cultivated and owned by them, and so classified as Miri land under Ottoman legal terms. In an expert opinion filed to the court, Oren Yiftachel said that these "tribal areas" of scattered tent clusters were not at that time registered with the authorities, but were nevertheless considered settled and met the definition of a "village" in the 1921 Land Ordinance.

The state's expert witness, Prof. Ruth Kark, said that prior to 1858 there had been no fixed settlements on or near the disputed land. The first permanent settlement had been Beersheba, which the Ottomans founded in 1900 and which is 11 kilometers from Al-Araqeeb – refuting the Beduin's claims that the land could not have been Mawat because it was both cultivated and next to a settlement. The State presented an aerial shot of the place which they said proved that the Al-Araqeeb area had no cultivated land during the British mandate period. The bedouin presented aerial photographs from 1945 onwards which they said showed extensive cultivation.

The verdict was presented by Judge Sarah Dovrat in the Beersheba District court on March 15, 2012. Based on the experts' testimony and the presented documents, the judge ruled in favor of the State, saying that the land was not "assigned to the plaintiffs, nor held by them under conditions required by law," and that they still had to "prove their rights to the land by proof of its registration in the Tabu" (Israel Lands Authority). The judge said that the Bedouin knew they were supposed to register but did not. She said, "The state said that although the complainants are not entitled to compensation, it has been willing to negotiate with them," and that "it is a shame that these negotiations did not reach any agreement." The court also ordered the Bedouin to pay legal costs of 50,000 NIS (approximately U.S. $13,500).

In its ruling, the court criticized the expert on the behalf of the plaintiffs, stating that his testimony lacked a sufficient factual basis value and reliable basis. In addition, the court held that the Bedouins' own internal documentation indicates they were well aware of the legal requirement to register the lands in the Land Registry, but chose not to do so. The judge affirmed that the practice of removal of encroached settlements carried out by the State is acceptable and legal.

In spite of the court ruling, the Al-Araqeeb residents continued to erect structures at the site. On April 23 and May 23, 2012, Al-Araqeeb was razed again. It was demolished for the 49th time in April 2013. The village has since been demolished more than 200 times.

In 2014, "Israeli authorities allegedly issued eviction orders to dead people" in Al-Araqeeb.

== See also ==
- Negev Bedouin
- Regional Council of Unrecognized Villages
- Blueprint Negev
