= Bimkom =

Israeli human rights organization

- Bimkom – Planners for Planning Rights
- בִּמקוֹם – מתכננים למען זכויות תכנון
- Formation: 1999
- Headquarters: Jerusalem
- Members: 11-17
- Website: bimkom.org

Bimkom – Planners for Planning Rights (Hebrew: במקום - מתכננים למען זכויות תכנון) is an Israeli human rights organization formed in 1999 by a group of professional planners and architects, in order to strengthen democracy and human rights in the field of spatial planning and housing policies, in Israel and in Area C of the West Bank, which is under Israeli control. Drawing on values of social justice, good governance, equality and community participation, Bimkom advances the development of planning policies and practices that are more just and respectful of human rights, and responsive to the needs of local communities. Bimkom strives to assist the weakest sectors of society through research and reports, community planning assistance and through awareness raising among planning authorities. Bimkom works with both Jewish and Arab communities among others, in attaining fair, equitable and appropriate planning of the physical spaces in which they live.

Bimkom, an accredited Israeli NGO, is funded by a variety of private and state-based foundations and funding organs.

== Achievements ==
Bimkom's work in partnership with other NGOs has led to the recognition of 11 unrecognized Bedouin villages and better planning for recognized villages.

Bimkom's Center for Planning Support in the Arab sector has assisted several townships, including Yarka, Ar'ara, Baqa al-Gharbiyye and Qalansawe, to obtain expansion of their respective development areas.

Bimkom, together with other social change organizations, introduced into the Urban Renewal Authority Law a number of measures designed to protect low-income residents.

Bimkom orchestrated cooperation between community organizations, international funding and the Jerusalem municipality that led to opening the first playground in Sur Baher, a Palestinian neighborhood in East Jerusalem.

Bimkom succeeded in having the villages of Dhar el-Malah and Sateh al-Baher in Area C connected to the electricity grid.

== Target issues ==
=== Protective infrastructure in the Arab sector ===
Less than one week into the Iran–Israel war that started on June 13, 2025 with daily missiles fired from Iran into Israel, the lack of protective infrastructure for Israel's Arab population was addressed by Bimkom in a position paper.

== See also ==
- New Israel Fund
- Bustan
- Projects working for peace among Israelis and Arabs
