= Prawer Plan =

Israeli plan for Negev Bedouin resettlement

The Bill on the Arrangement of Bedouin Settlement in the Negev, also called the Prawer Plan or the Begin–Prawer Plan, was formulated in September 2011 when the Israeli government approved a controversial five-year economic development plan. It was named for Ehud Prawer, the head of policy planning in the Israeli Prime Minister's Office.

One of its implications is a relocation of some 40,000–70,000 Negev Bedouin from areas not recognized by the government to government-recognized local councils. It was a cause of the 2013 Israeli protests (November).

== Commission ==
The "Prawer Commission" was set up to implement the recommendations of the Goldberg Commission on resolving the outstanding land issues between the Negev Bedouin and the State of Israel. Chaired by Ehud Prawer, Benjamin Netanyahu's director of planning, it published its recommendations on 2 June 2011.

The commission found that an estimated 50% of unrecognized villages were built within Jewish planning areas. It is recommended that the inhabitants of these villages, some 30,000 people – about 40% of the total Israeli Bedouin population, unrecognized by Israel, should be relocated to the seven existing government-built Bedouin townships.

It proposed that the villagers should be offered compensation of between $1.7 billion and $2.4 billion, including $365 million for expanding the townships. The compensation would be reduced to zero over a period of five years, and if an agreement had not been reached the land, would be forfeited and designated as state land.

A proposed-government sponsored vote in the Knesset was postponed after some members objected that the terms were too generous.

== Outline of the bill ==
The bill is based on a proposal developed by a team headed by Ehud Prawer, the head of policy planning in the Prime Minister's Office (PMO). And this proposal, in its turn, is based on the recommendations of the committee chaired by retired Supreme Court Justice Eliezer Goldberg. Maj.-Gen. (ret.) Doron Almog was appointed as the head of the staff to implement the plan to provide status for the Bedouin communities in the Negev. Minister Benny Begin has been appointed by the cabinet to coordinate public and Bedouin population comments on the issue.

According to the PMO official press release, the bill is based on four main principles:

1. Providing for the status of Bedouin communities in the Negev;
2. Economic development for the Negev's Bedouin population;
3. Resolving claims over land ownership; and
4. Establishing a mechanism for binding, implementation and enforcement, as well as timetables.

The bill is described as part of a campaign to develop the Negev, bring about better integration of Bedouin in Israeli society, and significantly reduce the economic and social gaps between the Bedouin population in the Negev and Israeli society. To facilitate this integration, Jewish families have been encouraged to settle in this part of the country to “make the desert bloom”, an oft-quoted Zionist phrase. However, these families often live in small, gated farming communities, fully serviced with water and electricity (oftentimes, Bedouin villages are not hooked up to the national grid, though this has been argued as a consequence of illegal Bedouin village construction, not as a form of discrimination). These farming communities have sprung up close to the Bedouin villages.

The government asserts that the bill will expand Bedouin communities, as some unrecognized communities will be recognized and receive public services, and infrastructure will be renewed, all within the framework of the Beer Sheva District masterplan. Most residents will be absorbed into the Abu Basma Regional Council, and the nature of future communities, whether agricultural, rural, suburban or urban, will be decided in full cooperation with the local Bedouin. For those who are to be relocated, 2/3 will receive a new residence nearby.

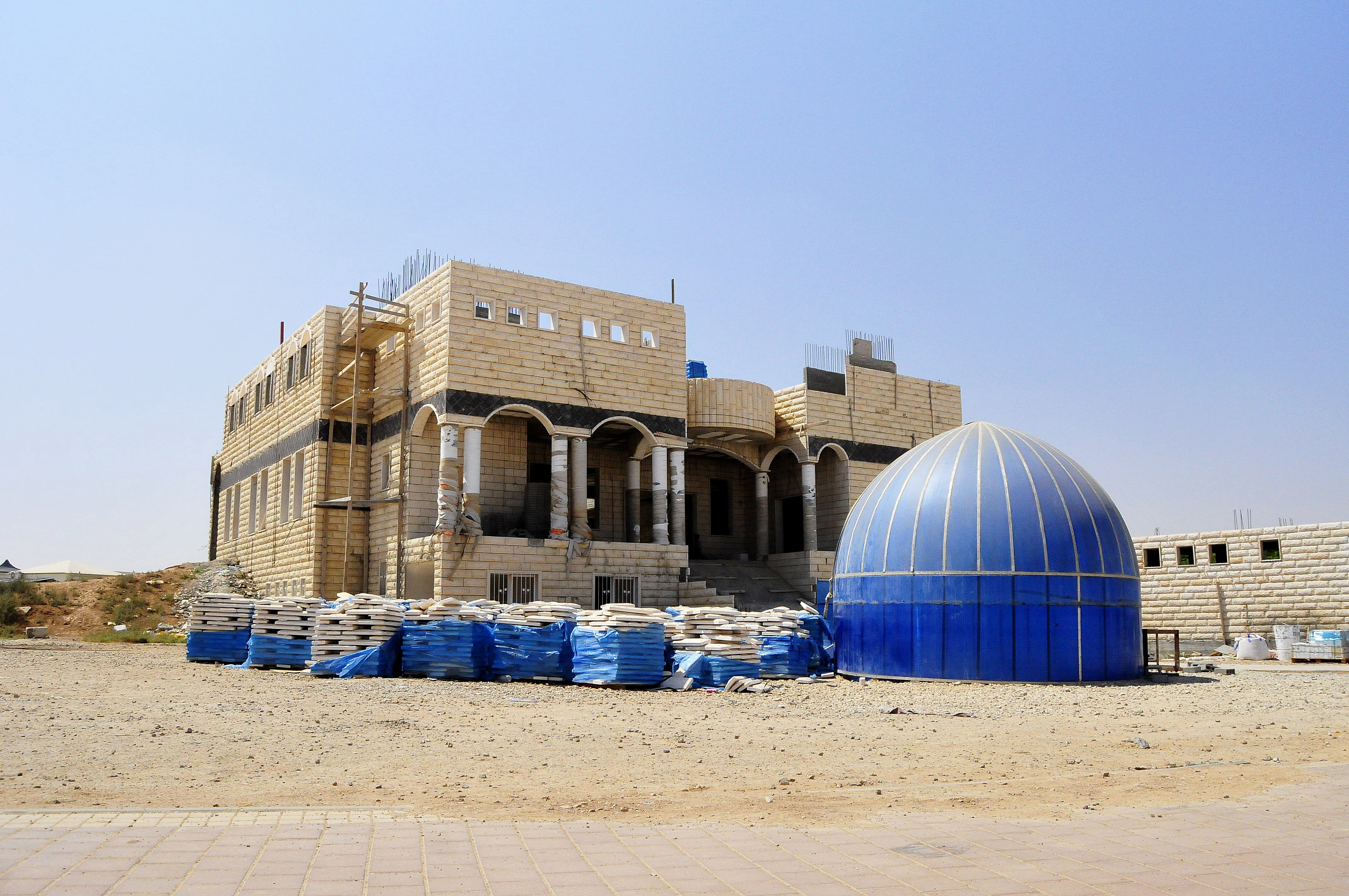
Tarabin al-Sana's mosque (its dome taken from the mosque in the previous Tarabin tribe residence place next to Omer)

Further, it is indicated that the bill seeks to address the numerous land claims filed by the Bedouin, offering significant compensation in land and funds, with each claim dealt in a unified and transparent way provided by law.

== Criticism ==
A United Nations committee has called for the withdrawal of the draft law that would move 30,000 Bedouin living in the Negev to permanent, existing Bedouin communities. Furthermore, the United Nations human rights chief urged Israel to reconsider a proposed law that would result in the demolition of up to 35 Bedouin villages, displacing as many as 40,000 members of these communities from their ancestral homes. “If this bill becomes law, it will accelerate the demolition of entire Bedouin communities, forcing them to give up their homes, denying them their rights to land ownership, and decimating their traditional cultural and social life in the name of development,” Ms. Pillay said. According to the Committee on the Elimination of Racial Discrimination, the Law for the Regulation of the Bedouin Settlement in the Negev is discriminatory and would legalize racist practices. Further critics of the Prawer Plan include an independent human rights organization and legal center, Adalah , which works to promote and defend the rights of Palestinian Arab citizens of Israel, as well as Palestinians living in the West Bank. The center describes the Bill, which was approved by the Israeli Knesset on 25 June 2013 with 43 votes for and 40 votes against, as discriminatory. They also say that the Arab Bedouin community totally rejects the plan.

The European Parliament heavily criticized the plan. In January 2012, hundreds of people protested the Prawer Plan in front of the Beersheba courthouse.

In 2013, over 1000 people protested forced demolitions and expulsions from Al-Zarnug, resulting in the arrest of over 20 protestors.

== Halt ==
According to Israel's Haaretz newspaper, on 12 December 2013, MK Benny Begin (one of the architects of the Prawer-Begin Plan) announced that the plan would be halted. The newspaper reported, however, that "[i]t is not clear whether the bill has been shelved or just temporarily postponed.
