= Taleb el-Sana =

Bedouin-Israeli politician and lawyer

- طلب الصانع
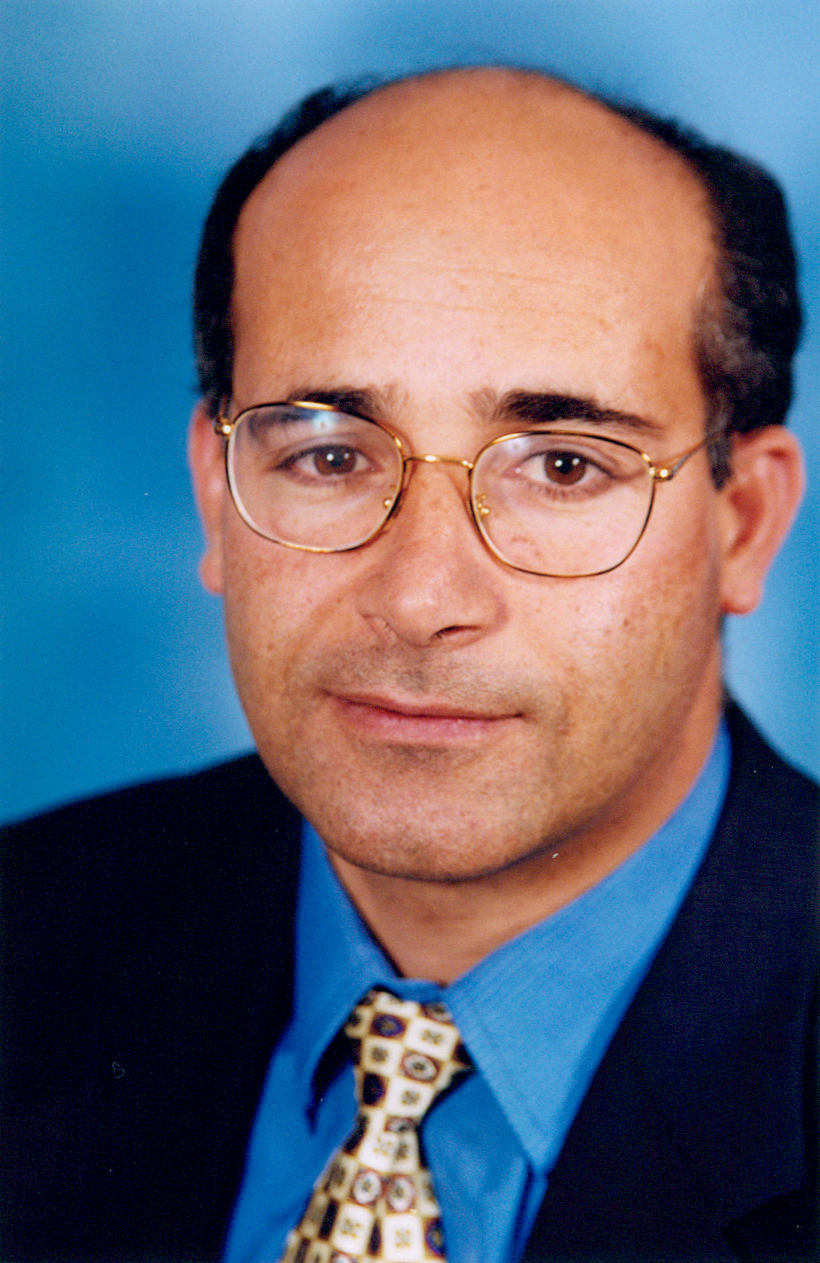

Faction represented in the Knesset
- 1992–1999: Arab Democratic Party
- 1999–2012: United Arab List
- 2012–2013: Arab Democratic Party

Personal details
- Born: 25 December 1960 (age 65) Tel Arad, Israel

Taleb el-Sana (Arabic: طلب الصانع, Hebrew: טלב אלצאנע; born 25 December 1960), sometimes spelled Talab al-Sana or variations thereof, is an Israeli Arab Bedouin politician and lawyer. He was the longest serving Arab Member of the Knesset until he lost his seat in 2013.

== Biography ==
Born in Tel Arad in the Negev, he is an Arab citizen of Israel of Bedouin origin. el-Sana studied law at the Hebrew University of Jerusalem and is a lawyer by profession. He is also active in many charitable organizations in the Negev.

El-Sana is married and the father of five children. He lives in the Bedouin town of Lakiya in the Negev.

== Political career ==
El-Sana was first elected to the 13th Knesset in 1992 on behalf of the Arab Democratic Party. Prior to the 1996 elections, the party ran on a joint list with the United Arab List, with el-Sana retaining his seat. The ADP was merged into the United Arab List soon after. In the 15th Knesset, he served as chair of the Committee on Drug Abuse.

After the 2003 elections, he became head of the United Arab List's parliamentary faction. When the party ran for the 2006 elections in a joint list with Ahmad Tibi's Ta'al, el-Sana remained head of the overall party. He retained his seat again in the 2009 elections.

Shortly before the 2013 elections, el-Sana left the United Arab List faction in the Knesset to re-establish the Arab Democratic Party. However, he ultimately ran with the United Arab List in the elections, placed fifth on its list. However, the party won only four seats, resulting in el-Sana leaving the Knesset.

El-Sana is known for his outspoken criticism of the Israeli government, prompting one Jerusalem Post commentator to suggest in 2010 that el-Sana be deported to Palestinian Authority-controlled territory.

== See also ==
- List of Arab members of the Knesset

Legal offices
Preceded by Eli Ben-Menachem	Chairman of the Committee on Drug Abuse; 1999–2003	Succeeded by Ayoob Kara
