= Unrecognized Bedouin villages in Israel =

Unauthorized Bedouin townships in the Negev

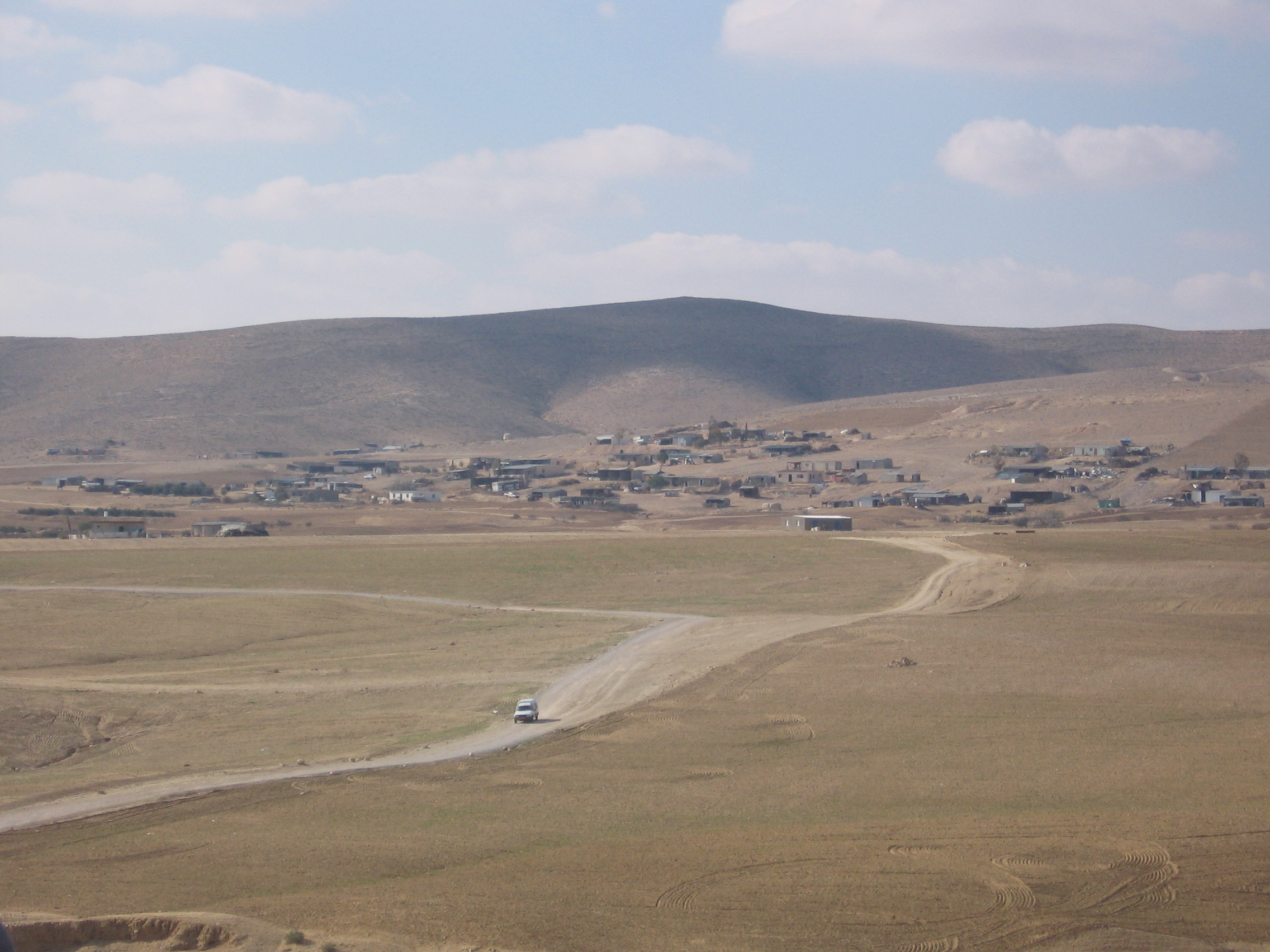
General view of one of the unrecognized Bedouin villages in the Negev Desert of Israel, January 2008

Unrecognized Bedouin villages in Israel are rural Bedouin communities in the Negev and the Galilee which the Israeli government does not recognize as legal. They are often referred to as "unrecognized villages".

== General data ==
=== Number of the villages ===
The exact number of unrecognized Bedouin villages is unknown. Different bodies use different definitions of the term "village". As a result, numbers offered by them differ, but there is an increase in the last decade, in spite of a slow recognition process of some of these communities.

According to Maha Qupty, representing the Bedouin advocacy organization RCUV, in 2004 there were 45 unrecognized Bedouin villages in the Negev. According to the Human Rights Watch report based upon the 2006 statistics offered by the Adva Center, approximately half of Bedouin citizens of Israel (85,000 out of 170,000) live in 39 such villages.

According to another Bedouin advocacy organization The Association of Forty, in 2013 there were about 92 unrecognized villages in Israel, 59 of them were Bedouin villages in the Negev.

According to the head of the Bedouin Administration, Yaakov Katz, and geographer Arnon Soffer, in the Negev area alone, there were about 1000 illegal Bedouin concentrations with over 64,000 homes in 2011, with about 2200-2000 new buildings adding every year. For comparison, in 2008 the Goldberg Commission stated that there were 50,000 illegal buildings in the Negev, and about 1,500 to 2,000 more were built every year.

Testifying before the Goldberg Committee in 2010, Israeli right-wing NGO Regavim reported 2,100 separate concentrations in Negev of 3–400 constructions each, covering over 800,000 dunams.

=== Size of the area ===
According to the Israel Land Administration, Negev Bedouin claim area 12 times bigger than that of Tel Aviv.

According to Arnon Sofer, the Bedouin make up about 2% of the Israeli population, but the unrecognized Bedouin communities spread on a vast territory and occupy more than 10 percent of Israel – north and east to Be'er Sheva. According to him, the Negev Bedouin have also started to settle west of Be'er Sheva and close to Mount Hebron. Their communities spread south to Dimona and towards the Judean Desert. They occupy large spaces near Retamim and Revivim and get close to the Gaza Strip, occupy land in the central Negev near Mitzpe Ramon, and even close to the central area. In 2010 alone about 66 illegal Bedouin settlements were established in the area of Rehovot and Rishon LeZion. According to Sofer, the Bedouin expansion continues rapidly in all directions and occupies spaces that Israel did not know before.

=== Number of residents ===
Between 1994 and 2007, Israel recognized 21 Arab townships with a similar illegal status until then. In the Galilee, most of the illegal villages were regulated and recognized, and from a population of 90,000 Bedouin in the north, a few hundred still live in unrecognized villages. In the south, it is estimated that about 90,000 residents live in unrecognized Bedouin villages; these Bedouin comprise 45% of the total Bedouin population.

=== Status ===
The unrecognized Bedouin villages were either built without authorization from the Israeli state or predate either the state itself or the "Planning and Construction Law" passed in 1965. As the state considers them a menace, they remain ineligible for municipal services, such as connection to the electrical grid, water mains or trash-pickup, and they cannot elect government representatives.

These communities dot the Northern Negev, with military fire zones, natural reserves and landfills often being built around them. For example, in the 1950s, the 'Azazme were forced off their grazing grounds and settled in Wadi al-Na'am. Since then, an Israel Defense Forces (IDF) munitions factory and military fire zone, the Efrat Oil Terminal – an oil-storage site, the Israel Electric Corporation and Mekorot – the national water carrier site have come to surround the village.

According to a report by the Israeli NGO Adva Center, "The Bedouin living in the Negev constitute the only group of Arab citizens of Israel that still has a large-scale hold on the land, a hold that the state officially denies in principle, while recognizing in practice."

According to the Israel Land Administration (2007), some 60 per cent of the Negev Bedouin lived in seven permanent state-planned townships, such as Rahat, Tel as-Sabi, Shaqib al-Salam (Segev Shalom), Ar'arat an-Naqab, Kuseife, Lakiya and Hura, while the rest (40 per cent) – "in illegal homes spread over hundreds of thousands of dunams".

Since 2003 a number of previously illegal Bedouin communities were recognized by the state (such as al-Sayyid), and several new ones were built (such as Tirabin al-Sana) totaling 12 (not including the previous seven townships). They were united under Abu Basma Regional Council that was split on 5 November 2012 into two newly created bodies: Neve Midbar Regional Council and al-Kasom Regional Council. As of July 2013, there are no updated official statistics on the number of Bedouin living outside the government-planned and officially recognized communities.

== History ==
=== The Ottoman Empire ===
During the 19th century and the first half of the 20th century, the semi-arid region of the Negev was inhabited mostly by semi-nomadic Bedouin tribes.

In 1858 the Turks enacted a law stating that all landowners names must be officially documented as a means of regulating matters relating to land in the Ottoman Empire. Most of the land in the Negev was classified as muwat (موات, dead land, wasteland unsuitable for cultivation).

The Bedouin did not create a written record of their connection to the land, and some argue that even opposed to it, since it would make them subject to the Ottoman Empire, what would require them to pay taxes and serve in the Ottoman army. Also, when the publication of the Ottoman Lands Ordinance, the Negev area had no permanent settlement.

By the year 1896 Negev Bedouin lived almost completely independently of the state. The Ottomans were not interested and did not intervene in the Negev and the Bedouins. According to Yosef Ben-Dor, only after a tribal war, the Turkish government marked tribal boundaries, but did not give the Bedouins in this agreement "ownership" of tribal territorial lands.

=== British Mandate ===
The British government adopted the Ottoman land laws, and added to them the Land Ordinance, intended to prevent squatting and recognition of unauthorized takeover of land.

In 1921, the government of the British Mandate issued an order for all the Negev residents to register their land. According to the Land Ordinance of 1921, any Bedouin who cultivated and improved a "mewat" (dead) land received a confirmation of ownership on that same land. Although the Bedouin were granted with a special extension of two months to register their land, they have never done so, and the land remained unregistered.

Mandate authorities also conducted a preliminary registration of land and since 1934 began to collect land taxes. Mandatory maps show the location of the Bedouin tribes, however, the maps never marked the boundaries of each tribe.

The 1947 report of the United Nations Special Committee on Palestine estimated the number of bedouins in the Beersheba district to be about 90,000. In preparation for a 1946 census of Palestine that was never carried out, the British government surveyed all the tribes in situ and concluded that the number of bedouin in the Beersheba district was about 92,000 out of 127,000 in the whole country. It also reported that they "cultivated about two million dunums of cereal land and that aerial photographs of the northern Beersheva taken by the Royal Air Force revealed the existence of 3,389 houses and 8,722 tents." The same figure of two million dunams appeared in a 1944/5 book of Yosef Weitz, but in contrast "Shimoni and Tartakover estimate the area cultivated by Bedouin in the Negev at only 60,000 dunam."

According to Sasson Bar Zvi, a cultural researcher of the Negev Bedouin, and Arie Efrat who served as director for the Arab villages in the south, the lack of water in the Negev area did not allow its residents to revive the land and therefore they preferred nomadic life and shepherding to an organized and rental land cultivation, and this is why the land remained a desolate area.

According to the Bedouin, although they did not document land ownership, the Turkish government and the British recognized the rights of ownership of land in which they roamed, and this recognition was expressed when the Bedouins sold land to the Zionist movement during the British Mandate, and the sales were recognized and recorded in the Tabu (land registry). In contrast, Yosef Ben-David explains this fact by claiming that the Ottoman and British authorities saw a blessing in transferring land from the Bedouin to the applicant for registration, because they will be likely to use land intensively, without the authorities taking into consideration any legal rights the Bedouins had to the land recognized by either government.

Furthermore, Jews who dealt with redemption of lands in the establishment of Israel gave ex gratia funds to the Bedouin to enable the rapid registration of Israel lands in the land registry, and not because legal recognition of ownership of the Bedouin on the land. Since the beginning of the 1930s and until the establishment of the State of Israel, the Bedouin sold almost 765,000 dunams of land, of which about 180,000 sold to JNF representatives and about 45,000 dunams to private Jews. The rest 545,000 dunams, were sold mainly to Arab peasants from the Gaza Strip.

=== Israel ===
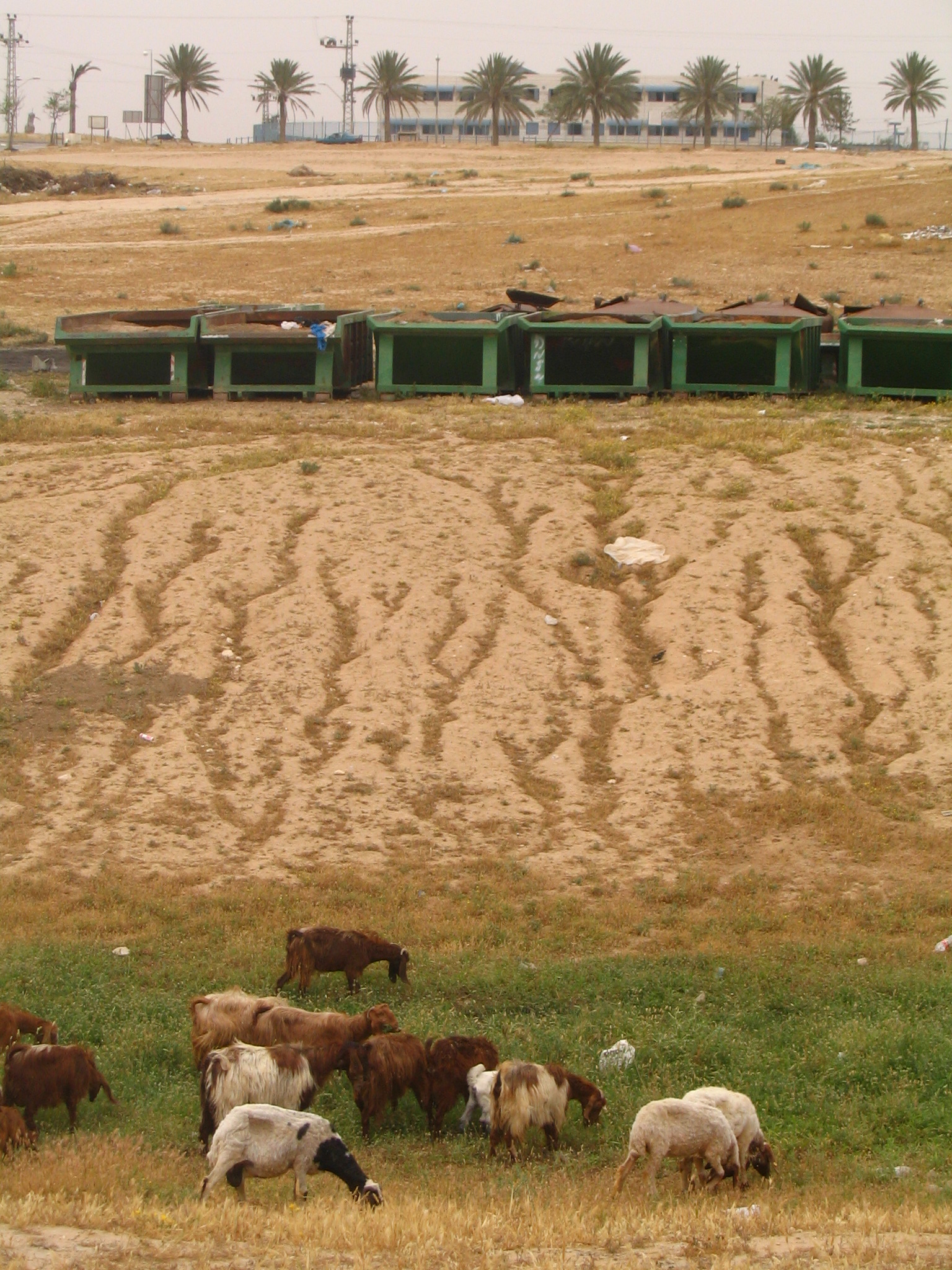
Goats grazing beneath garbage bins in Tel Sheva

During the 1948 Arab–Israeli War, the Negev region saw harsh battles between the newly created IDF and the Egyptian army. In the aftermath of the war, most of the Negev was included within the borders of the newly established State of Israel. Censuses before and after the war indicate that about 80% of the Bedouin population left the Negev to areas that remained under Arab rule.

The Israeli authorities' treatment of the Bedouin population was ambivalent. On the one hand, the Bedouin were considered loyal to the new state, and some of them even volunteered to serve in the IDF. On the other hand, Israel saw the Negev as its "hinterland", being sparsely populated and as the West Bank came under Jordanian rule. The policy eventually adopted was forcing the Bedouin to concentrate in an area of 1,100 km^{2}, that has become known as the Siyagh (Arabic for "the permitted area") region, stretching between the West Bank border to the north-east, Be'er Sheva to the south-west and Arad to the south. All the Bedouin remaining under Israeli rule were granted Israeli citizenship, but the Siyagh region was placed under martial law until 1966, like many other mostly Arab-populated areas in Israel at the time. This was the time when most of the unrecognized villages of today were established.

The Bedouin claims for ownership on lands in the Negev were, by and large, rejected by the Israeli authorities, on the pretext that the ownership is not appropriately documented or that the lands claimed are not eligible to private ownership. Both Bedouin citizens and state authorities agree that only a small minority of the claim can be backed with full legally valid documentation, however the Bedouin claimants demand that their traditional ties with the lands, namely the fact that they de facto held the rights on these lands without objection on behalf of the former Ottoman or British authorities, be recognized by the State of Israel as ownership.

Implementing her land policies, Israel started to rely on the Ottoman Land Code of 1858, the only preceding law frame in the region. According to these regulations, lands that were not registered as of private ownership, were considered state lands. Israel relied mainly on Tabu recordings. Most of the Bedouin land fell under the Ottoman class of 'non-workable' (mawat) land and thus belonged to the state under Ottoman law. Eventually, Israel nationalized most of the Negev lands, using The Land Rights Settlement Ordinance from 1969.

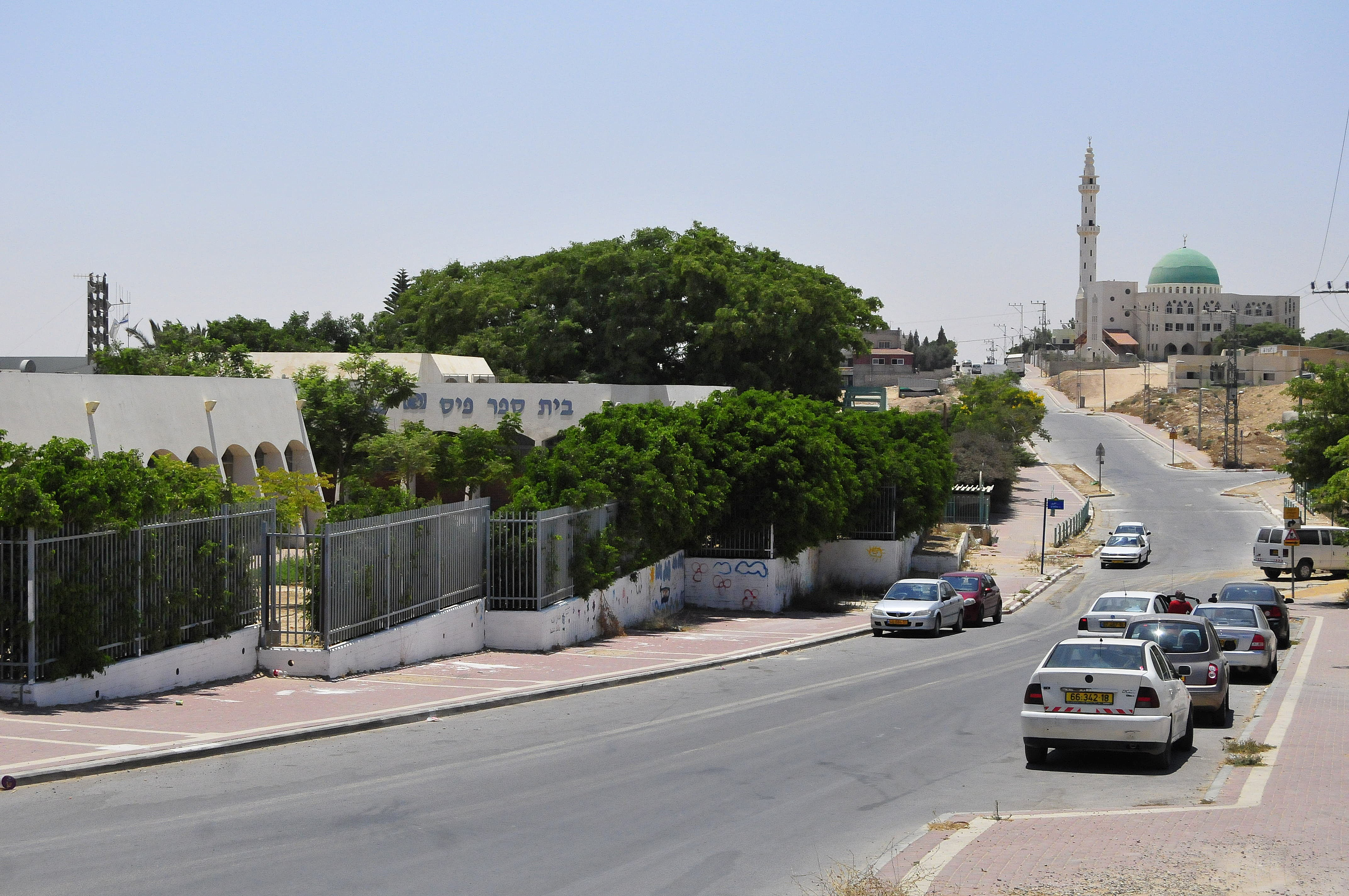
Hura downtown

In order to reinforce the invisible Siyag fence and sedentarize the Bedouin, the State employed a reining mechanism, the Black Goat Law of 1950. The Black Goat Law curbed grazing so as to prevent land erosion, prohibiting the grazing of goats outside recognized land holdings. Since few Bedouin territorial claims were recognized, most grazing was thereby rendered illegal.

Most Bedouin who had the option, preferred not to register their lands under the Ottoman rule as this would mean being taxed without representation or services. Those whose land claims were recognized found it almost impossible to keep their goats within the periphery of their newly limited range. Into the 1970s and 1980s, only a small portion of the Bedouin were able to continue to graze their goats. Instead of migrating with their goats in search of pasture, the majority of the Bedouin migrated in search of wage-labor.

In the mid-1970s Israel let the Negev Bedouin register their land claims and issued special certificates that served as the basis for the "right of possession" later granted by the government. Following the signing of the Treaty of Peace with Egypt, it became necessary to move an airport from a Sinai Peninsula to a locality inhabited by some five thousand Bedouin. The government, recognizing these land claim certificates, negotiated with the certificate holders and paid compensation to them. Most moved to Bedouin townships, built houses and established businesses.

The Israeli government has promoted the sedentarization of the Bedouin population. In 1963, Moshe Dayan said:

We should transform the Bedouins into an urban proletariat – in industry, services, construction, and agriculture. 88% of the Israeli population are not farmers, let the Bedouin be like them. Indeed, this will be a radical move which means that the Bedouin would not live on his land with his herds, but would become an urban person who comes home in the afternoon and puts his slippers on. His children will get used to a father who wears pants, without a dagger, and who does not pick out their nits in public. They will go to school, their hair combed and parted. This will be a revolution, but it can be achieved in two generations."

— Israeli General Moshe Dayan to Haaretz, 1963

Dayan added, "Without coercion but with governmental direction ... this phenomenon of the Bedouins will disappear".

The Bedouin communities in the Negev, many unrecognised by the Israeli government, were classified as "open areas" during the 2014 Israel–Gaza conflict and so their 200,000 residents did not have warning sirens or anti-rocket protection.

== State treatment ==
=== Arrangement attempts ===
In the 1970s Israel collected all the "claims of ownership" in the Negev, without permits and without proof, for the purpose of registering these claims. However, the Bedouin saw the state registry as a recognition for their claims. More than 3,000 ownership claims were filed for the land sized over 800,000 dunams, which includes nearly the whole area between Be'er Sheva – Arad – Dimona and other areas throughout the entire Negev, including those that belong to kibbutzim and cities.

In the first years of the arrangement, anyone demanding area of over 400 dunams had the opportunity to get 20% of the land from the Land Registry, and for the rest of the area they would receive financial compensation. Anyone who demanded less than 400 dunams, had received only monetary compensation. In addition, the state of Israel compensated the Bedouin for any building, tin shack, barn or even a tree that the Bedouin placed and the government removed. The compensation value was even higher than the property's value in the market. In 20% of the claims the state has reached a settlement with the Bedouin.

At the same time, some Bedouin tried to claim the land ownership in the court, despite the May 1984 Supreme Court precedent ruling of Justice Avraham Halima, stating that Bedouin are nomads by definition and thus cannot have any ownership of land. In all 80 cases in which Bedouin claims arrived to court, the judges ruled in favor of the state, since there was no document proving Bedouin land ownership. According to recent data submitted to the Goldberg Commission by the Bedouin Administration in July 2008, 2840 claims remained, whose overall area is 571,186 dunams.

=== Planned townships ===
Dealing with the problem of the Negev Bedouin, between 1968 and 1989 Israel built seven planned townships especially for the Bedouin in the attempt to urbanize them. The largest Bedouin locality in Israel, the city of Rahat, was established in 1971. Other townships include Tel as-Sabi (Tel Sheva) (established in 1969), Shaqib al-Salam (Segev Shalom) in 1979, Ar'arat an-Naqab (Ar'ara BaNegev) and Kuseife in 1982, Lakiya in 1985 and Hura in 1989.

Since grazing has been severely restricted, and the Bedouin rarely receive permits to engage in subsistence agriculture, few of the Bedouin in unrecognized villages consider the urban townships as desirable form of settlement. Denied access to their former sources of sustenance via grazing restrictions, severed from the possibility of access to water, electricity, roads, education, and health care in the unrecognized villages, tens of thousands of Bedouin citizens of Israel resettled in the townships.

According to Ben Gurion University's Negev Center for Regional Development, these first towns were poorly planned and were lacking business districts or industrial zones; as Harvey Lithwick of the Negev Center for Regional Development explains: "the major failure was a lack of an economic rationale for the towns".

=== Abu Basma Regional Council ===
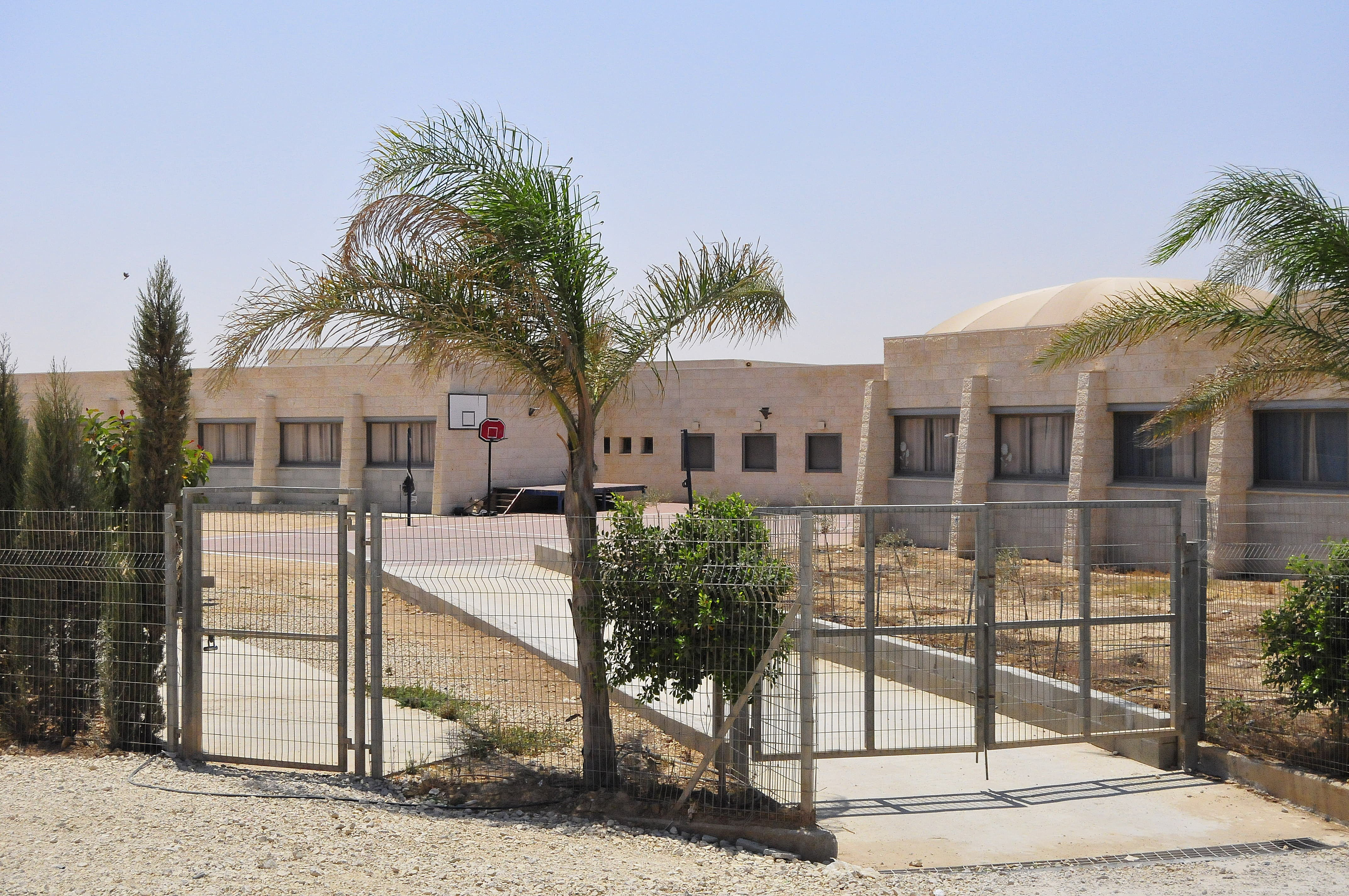
A newly built school in al-Sayyid

On 29 September 2003 Israeli government has adapted a new "Abu Basma Plan" (Resolution 881), according to which a new regional council was formed, unifying a number of unrecognized Bedouin settlements – Abu Basma Regional Council. This resolution also regarded the need to establish seven new Bedouin settlements in the Negev, literally meaning the official recognition of unrecognized settlements, providing them with a municipal status and consequently with all the basic services and infrastructure. The council was established by the Interior Ministry on 28 January 2004.

Moreover, Israel is currently building or enlarging some 13 towns and cities in the Negev. According to the general planning, all of them will be fully equipped with the relevant infrastructure: schools, medical clinics, postal offices, etc. and they also will have electricity, running water and waste control. Several new industrial zones are planned, some are already being constructed, like Idan HaNegev on the suburbs of Rahat. It will have a hospital and a new campus inside.

=== Recognition vs demolition ===
Israel is trying to solve the problem of unrecognized villages by attracting the scattered communities into government-planned townships and villages offering land plots at low prices and as an extreme measure – following the court order and all the legal procedure – demolishes houses built without state's permission on what it considers to be state lands. The unrecognized villages are not accurately marked on any official maps.

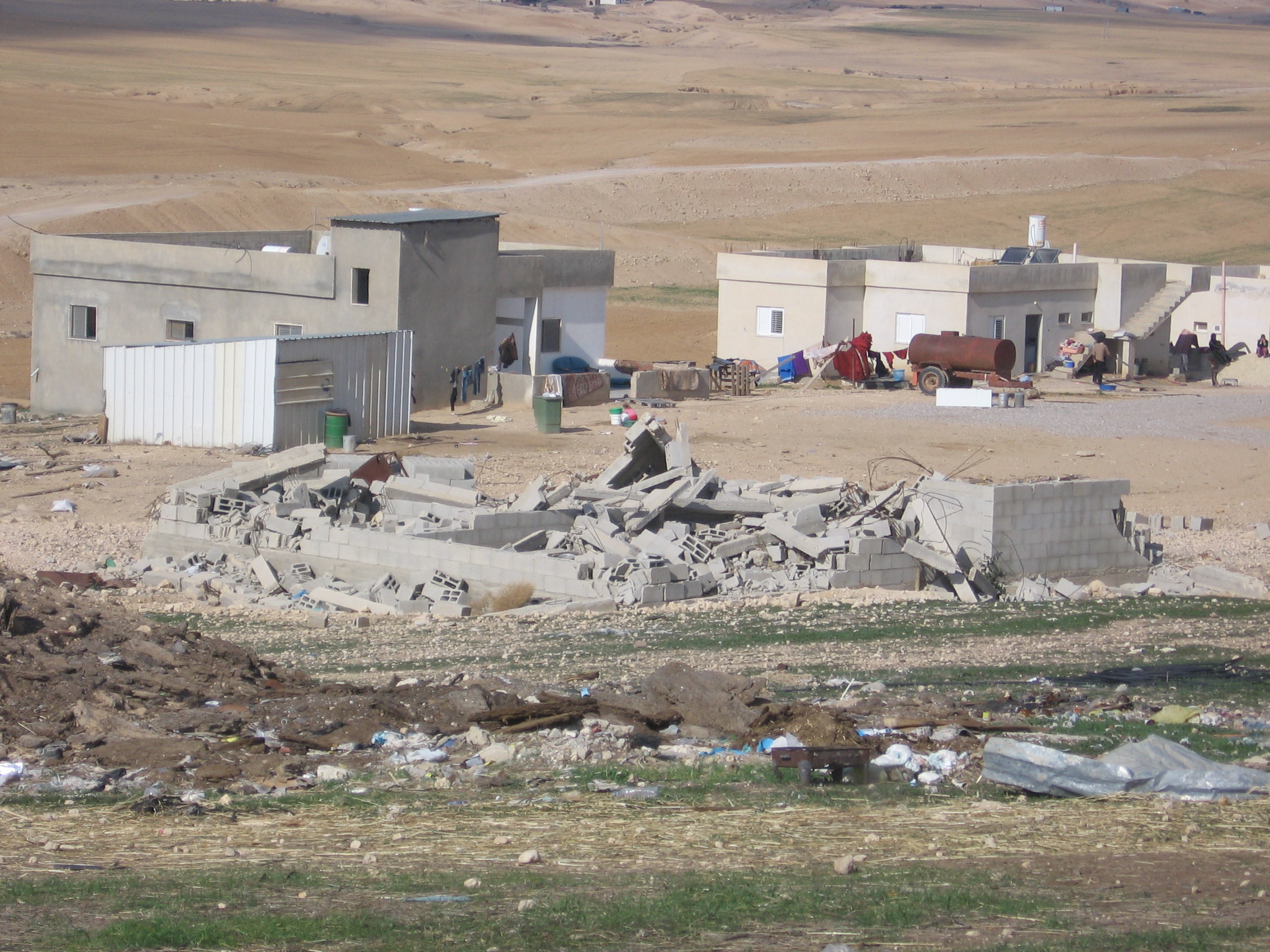
Demolished house in the unrecognized Bedouin village of Alsara, January 2008

A number of villages has been recognized in the 2000s as a part of creation of the Abu Basma Regional Council. In 2009 the Goldberg Commission recommended that most of the 46 unrecognised villages east of Route 40 should be recognised and their 50,000 illegal structures be legalized.

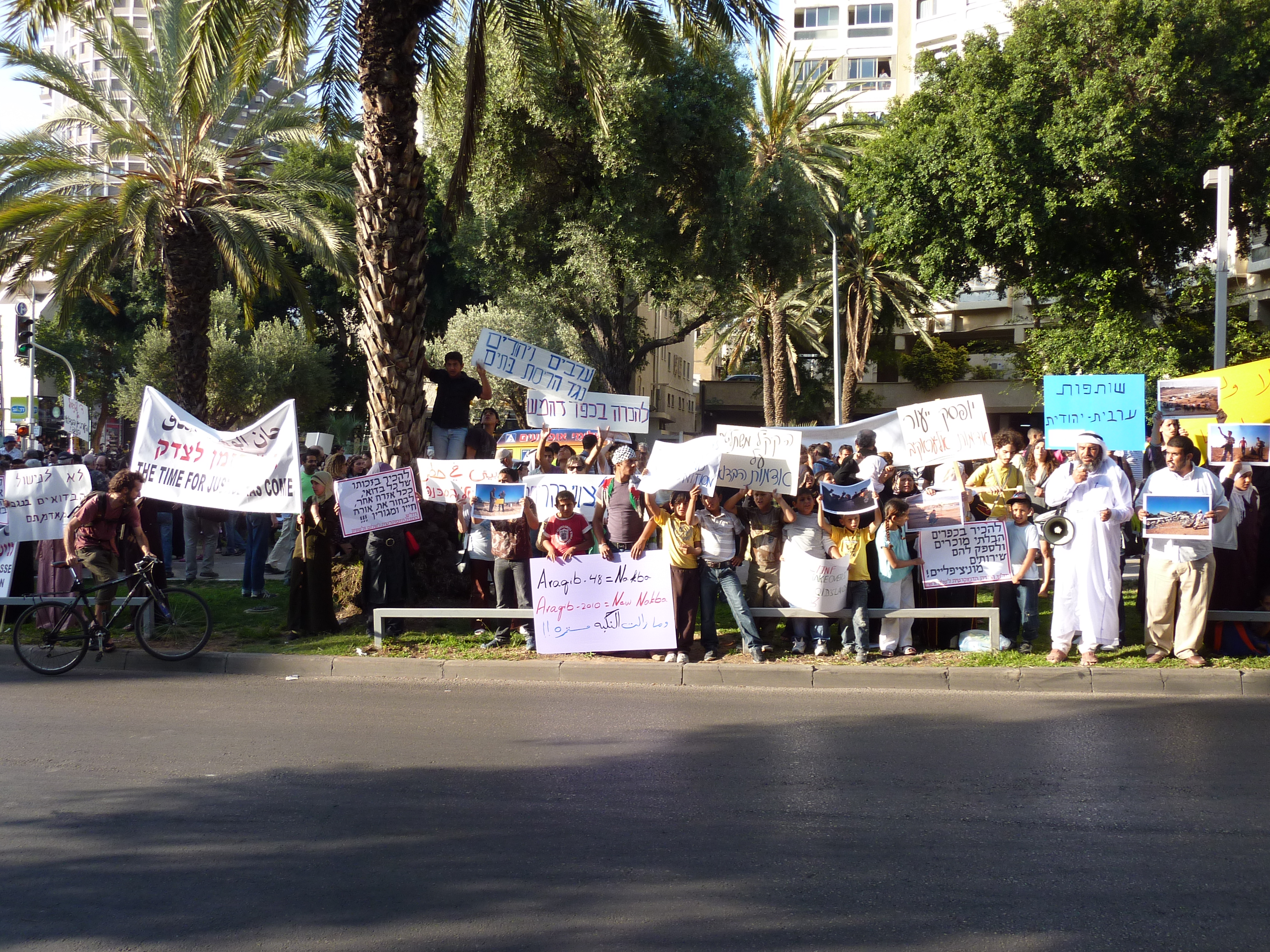
Bedouins demonstrating in Tel Aviv for the right to return to their village of Al-Araqib, 12 May 2010

In 2010, Israeli authorities demolished the unrecognized village of al-Araqeeb. Since then it has been rebuilt and destroyed several dozen times (September 2012). The matter of land ownership in the area of al-Araqeeb was raised in court when several members of al-Uqbi family filed a suit against the State claiming ownership of land. After a thorough examination of this case involving leading experts in the field, in March 2012 came a court ruling in favor of the State. Judge Sarah Dovrat said that the land was not "assigned to the plaintiffs, nor held by them under conditions required by law," and that they still had to "prove their rights to the land by proof of its registration in the Tabu" (Israel Lands Authority). The judge noted that the Bedouin knew they were supposed to register but did not.

=== Prawer plan ===
In September 2011, the Israeli government approved a five-year economic development plan called the Prawer plan. One of its implications is a relocation of some 30.000–40.000 Negev Bedouin from areas not recognized by the government to government-approved townships.

According to the PMO official press release, the plan is based on four main principles:

1. Providing for the status of Bedouin communities in the Negev;
2. Economic development for the Negev's Bedouin population;
3. Resolving claims over land ownership; and
4. Establishing a mechanism for binding, implementation and enforcement, as well as timetables.

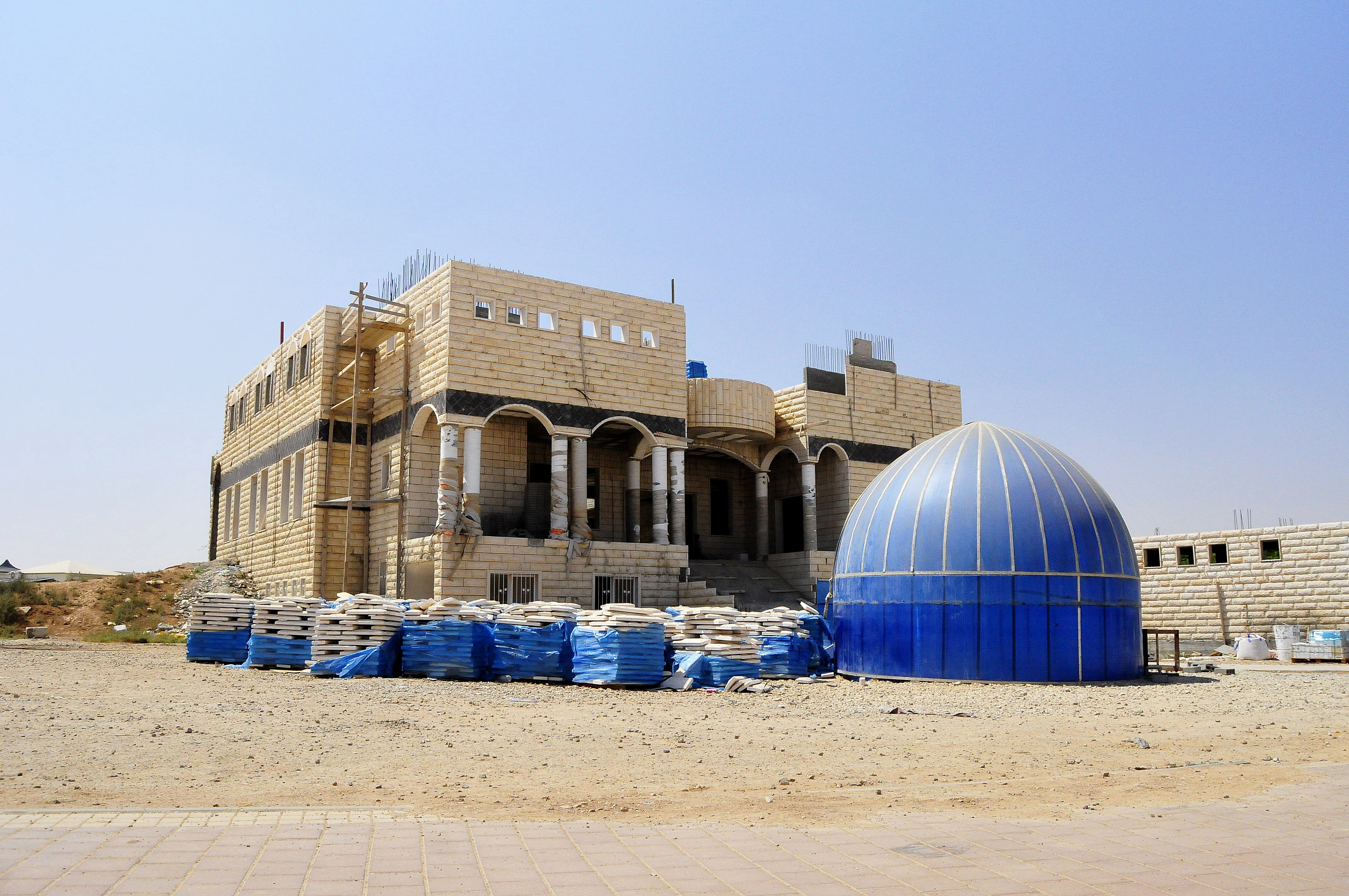
Tirabin al-Sana's mosque (its dome taken from mosque in the previous Tarabin tribe residence place next to Omer)

When the cabinet approved it, simultaneously it also approved a NIS 1.2 billion economic development program for Bedouin Negev whose main purpose is to support the Bedouin women and youth in the fields of employment since they will contribute to the increased economic growth of the entire Bedouin community. Much of the approved funds will be allocated for the development of industrial zones, establishment of employment centers and professional training.

According to the Prawer plan, the present Bedouin communities will undergo a comprehensive planning process. The existing communities will be expanded, some unrecognized communities will be recognized and start to receive public services, while their infrastructure will be renewed. All these changes will be done in the framework of the Beer Sheva District masterplan. It's important to note that the nature of these future communities, whether agricultural, rural, suburban or urban will be decided in full cooperation with the local Bedouin. For those of them who are to be relocated, 2/3 of them will receive a new residence nearby.

The Prawer plan seeks to give an answer to numerous land claims filed by the Bedouin. It will offers significant compensation in land and funds – 50% of the claim (currently it's only 20% offered), while each claim will be dealt in a unified and transparent way provided by law.

Nevertheless, exists harsh criticism of the Prawer plan. Critics say that it will turn Bedouin dispossession into law and come to a conclusion that relocation of the Bedouin will be compelled. Some even speak about ethnic cleansing. As a result, these remarks provoked heavy criticism of the plan by the European Parliament.

There are several examples of success in this matter: after a number of complicated agreements with the state all of the Bedouin of Tarabin clan moved into a township built for them – Tirabin al-Sana. Following negotiations, the Bedouin of al-'Azazme clan will take part in the planning of a new quarter that will be erected for them to west of Segev Shalom township, cooperating with The Authority for the Regulation of Bedouin Settlement in the Negev.

=== Hindrances for the arrangement ===
One of the main hindrances in finding a solution for the illegal settlement is the Bedouin Tribal Law which states that one should not settle on a land that other Bedouin claims to own it.

According to the head of the unrecognized villages – Hussein Abu Pia testifying in front of the Goldberg Committee members: "If the land is in a one Bedouin's claim of ownership, the other will not come close. He would not dare. He will prefer to live in a cave, instead of approaching the land".

There is a common phenomenon of the Bedouin who receive compensation and new homes in legal towns, yet return and construct again in state lands thus not fulfilling the agreements signed with the government. They were paid a compensation for relinquishing their claims to the state, but still claim ownership on the land to other Bedouin, so the problem remains unsolved. The town of Kuseife, for example is built almost entirely on lands claimed by different tribes, and thus two-thirds of the city is empty.

Bedouin lands' claims don't take into account central planning issues. When agreement made, the Bedouin receive 20%–62% of the land they claimed. These lands are speckled with those registered in the Land Registry as belonging to other Bedouin. As a result, the state encounters a serious problem developing Negev. Due to this issue, it is not possible to develop the eastern part of the Be'er Sheva metropolitan.

According to government sources, another hindrance in the arrangement attempts is the absence of deadline for the negotiations. According to Prof. Sofer: "Bedouin always say 'no' to attempts to reach a compromise with them about the lands that they claim, because they know that every 'no' only strengthens them. One of the main problems in this program is lack of a final date. The state should set a date by which it is willing to give increased compensation for those who erase the claim of ownership, and from there on – no more compromise and a confrontation is needed even if it will come at a high price."

According to officials involved in negotiations, there is a lack of consistency in granting compensations. The Bedouin Administration manages negotiations with each tribe or family separately, so the compensation size differs. Conciliatory families receive lower compensation, while the recalcitrant families' compensation is higher (a good example is the evacuation of the Bedouin Tarabin from the outskirts of Omer). The state also offers higher compensations to families with a leader that the government needs by their side, or to families that claim land ownership in the areas of special importance to the state. One of the reasons for the lack of uniformity is the crisis of the Bedouin community leadership. Currently there is no agreed Bedouin leadership to resolve the land issue, and the Bedouin refuse to place representatives on the ground, so there is no authority to represent all of the claimants.

Another factor hindering the arrangement is tribal feud. According to one of the negotiators, attorney Itay Bar, Southern District Attorney for Civil Affairs, "Sometimes you can not place one Bedouin next to another because his son insulted him 20 years ago".

According to Faisal el-Husael, the public representative from the Bedouin inside the Goldberg committee, often the Bedouin are not willing to relocate to planned towns since they prefer rural settlements to semi-urban townships.

=== Accusation of forced displacement ===
In March 2026, the Israeli human rights organization Adalah said that the Negev's Bedouins were ″facing an unprecedented crisis of forced displacement, mass evictions and home demolitions at the hands of the State of Israel″. The anger of the Bedouin populations was expressed at the ballot box during the legislative elections of October 2026.

== Features ==
=== High natural growth ===
The Israeli state consider the high fertility rate among Bedouins to be a big problem. The Negev Bedouin have one of the highest rates of natural growth in the world, standing at 4–5.5% per year, which means doubling the population every 12–15 years. So while in 1951 they numbered 12,000, in 1970 – about 25,000, in 1990 – about 87,000 people, and in 2008 – approximately 180,000. In 2020 are expected to reach 400,000.

In 2008 Israel Central Bureau of Statistics stated that fertility rate among the Arab population in the south of Israel (primarily Bedouin) dropped from 9 children per woman in 2003 to 7.6 children in 2005, but it still remains high relatively to other population groups inside Israel.

The high fertility rate for Bedouin is exacerbated by polygamy (up to 36% of Bedouin men are polygamous) and illegal immigration estimated at 16,000 women who immigrated for polygamy (until 2004) and were accompanied by their families.

In 2008, the state together with Bedouin leaders initiated a state program to address the phenomenon of Bedouin polygamy and its severely harmful effects on family structure.

Bedouin advocates argue that the main reason for the transfer of the Bedouin into townships was demographic. They note that in 2003, director of the Israeli Population Administration Department, Herzl Gedj, described polygamy in the Bedouin sector as a "security threat" and advocated various means of reducing the Arab birth rate. In 2003, Shai Hermesh, the treasurer of the Jewish Agency, told The Guardian: "We need the Negev for the next generation of Jewish immigrants" and added, "It is not in Israel's interest to have more Palestinians in the Negev." Bedouin rights groups opposed this plan, as they were concerned that the unrecognized villages might be cleared to make way for Jewish development and potentially ignite internal civil strife.

In October 2011 the government decided to establish seven new agricultural settlements in the area of Mevo'ot Arad. On 14 August 2012, residents of five unrecognized Bedouin villages, along with residents of Arad, the Association for Civil Rights in Israel (ACRI), Bimkom – Planners for Planning Rights, and the Negev Coexistence Forum for Civil Equality, petitioned the High Court of Justice against the plan saying that it will uproot 800 Bedouin.

=== Acceleration in illegal construction ===
Israel has encountered a problem of maintaining law due to uncontrolled illegal construction in the Negev Bedouin dispersed communities. In 1945 there were 290 illegal structures in the dispersed communities, in 1956 – 955, in 1994 – 12,000, in 1998 – 24,225, in 2004 – 42,561, and in 2011 – 64,000. Between the years 1998–2001, the demolition of illegal buildings stopped as a government policy and gradually resumed later. Law enforcement has failed, and there is no viable option to destroy all illegal construction. The threat of destruction does not deter residents from illegal building.

According to enforcement officials, it is not possible to monitor every case of illegal construction because the residents who build in the dispersed communities impose on the inspectors criminal and terrorist threats.

According to the Commissioner of Administrative Enforcement Shlomo Cizzer: "We evacuate only intruders who have a place to live, we have evacuated, and will re-evacuate, the people who invaded al-Araqeeb, because they have homes in Rahat, Lod, and in Kafr Qasim. They invaded just to prove ownership of the land. There are tens of thousands of others who are also criminals whom we do not evacuate, because they have no other houses to go to. Until the state decides what to do with them, we will act in accordance with the law ".

=== Ecological issues ===
While Bedouin take up open spaces that could be used for touristic purposes and construction of towns to accommodate new settlers, prominent Israeli environmental figures argue, that unapproved construction of unrecognized villages are an environmental hazard.

Some ecologists say that Bedouin communities are causing damage to ecosystems since the Negev has unique habitats. There is a transitional area between the desert and the border region of the south of Judaean Mountains and Shfela, where most plant and animal species perform a gradation between habitats. Therefore, this zone is vital for them, especially during the global warming when species of the desert are expected to migrate to the north.

The keeping and feeding livestock bring steady amounts of vegetation food that grow wild and bring about consolidation of invading flora species. The Bedouins keep livestock in herds greater than the carrying capacity of the land, which leads to serious overgrazing, and to the creation of vast areas of empty of any plants. The cumulative effect creates huge areas where there is no vegetation at all (not natural and not agricultural) and no animals. In fact, the result is an ongoing and total destruction of habitat. Species unique to the region as Pterocles, houbara bustard, leopard fringe-fingered lizard and irises, disappeared from large surfaces.

Illegal gas stations in the Bedouin dispersed communities represent a threat to the quality of air, soil and groundwater as fuel tanks do not meet basic standards of environmental protection meant to ensure that the fuel does not soak into the soil and groundwater, as well as the fuel itself does not meet environmental standards.

According to Itamar Ben Dodi from the Society for the Protection of Nature in Israel, the lack of sewage infrastructure and waste removal and illegal slaughter houses in the Bedouin dispersed communities cause an accumulation and spreading of wastewater and household waste that reach streams channels and cause odor nuisances, health problems for residents, and damage to nature.

In July 2013 Israeli government ordered to allocate NIS 40 million for garbage pick-up and recycling for the Negev Bedouin communities in the area of the Al-Kasom and Neveh Midbar regional councils – for the first time. The main reason for the lack of garbage collecting services was unresolved land ownership disputes. Some homes in the area do not have legal standing and consequently do not pay local taxes which leads to the lack of income for the local authorities to operate garbage collection services.

A large number of Israelis, including both Bedouin and Jews, are settled in some 2.5% of the Negev desert available for civilian use living in proximity to Israel's nuclear reactors, 22 agro and petrochemical factories, an oil terminal, closed military zones, quarries, a toxic waste incinerator (Ramat Hovav), cell towers, a power plant, several airports, a prison, and two rivers of open sewage. Some of this infrastructure is concentrated on the grounds of the unrecognized village of Wadi el-Na'am. According to the Ministry of Health data (as of June 2004), the rates of cancer and mortality are 65% higher for those living within a 20 km radius of the Ramat Hovav Industrial Zone. Some 350,000 people live within this danger zone, including the residents of Beer Sheva.

== See also ==
- Bedouin
- Negev Bedouin
- Negev Bedouin women
- Sedentism
