= Azazima =

Bedouin tribe

The Azazima/Azazimeh or Azazme/ 'Azazmeh/al-Azazmeh (Arabic: العزازمة) are a Bedouin tribe whose grazing territory used to be the desert around the wells at El Auja and Bir Ain on the border between Israel and Egypt.

During the 19th century the 'Azazme fought as allies with the Tarabin in their war against the Tiyaha. Subsequently they were in a land dispute with the Tarabin, the War of Zari, which lasted for several years until the founding of modern Beersheba and the extension of Ottoman authority. In April 1875 Lieut. Claude R. Conder, who was surveying Gaza District for the Palestine Exploration Fund, reported a "fierce contest" going on around Beersheba between the 'Azazme and the Tiyaha.

An early twentieth century explorer reported that one of the favorite grazing grounds belonging to the 'Azazme was a strip of hilly country eight miles in width between Wady Jeraafy and Wady Ubaira, 115 km south of Beersheba. He describes the land as "well grown with bush and grass."

In the early 20th century the 'Azazme established a village at al-Khalasa, which was the site of an ancient Nabatean settlement on the route between Gaza and Petra.

In 1930 they were reported to number 10,000, divided into ten sub-sections. Hillelson, writing for the Palestine Exploration Quarterly (PEQ) in 1937, states that "they are of dark complexion, and conspicuous for honesty and patient bearing in adversity, and they will do their utmost for the guest ... Their women herd the flocks. Men respect women because they have good Arab manners. Scarcity of grazing compels them to a wandering life more than other tribes. The area over which they wander is spacious, but affords little opportunity for cultivation: yet they grow a little wheat and barley, and a few of them cultivate millet and water melons."

In 1948, the 'Azazme numbered around 3,500. During 1950 the entire tribe was driven from the area around El Auja. In a series of raids the IDF burnt tents and shot at anyone approaching the wells. The IAF was used to strafe encampments. On 28 September 1953, the IDF established the kibbutz Ktzi'ot on land claimed by the 'Azazme. A UN investigation into the murder of eleven Israelis at Scorpion Pass, 17 March 1954, found that the killings were committed by men from the 'Azazme who had joined a group known as the Black Hand gang, based at Qussaima. Despite the evidence that the attackers came from across the Egyptian border, the IDF launched a reprisal raid against Nahalin in the West Bank.

Prior to 1948, one section of the 'Azazme lived in Wadi Al-Akhdar, 'the green valley', between Bir Saba' and Faluja. In the early 1950s, the Israeli army moved them to the hills south of Hebron. In 1969 they crossed the border into Wadi Araba, but the Jordanian authorities refused to let them proceed any further fearing a general exodus of Bedouins from the Negev. They were also refused refugee status. Many of them were expelled by Ariel Sharon from the area of Abu-Ageila in a secret operation conducted in late January 1972.

There are at least nine Israeli towns on land claimed by the 'Azazme, including the military camp and prison at Ktzi'ot and the town and nuclear plant at Dimona.

'Azazme population centres in Israel include: Wadi al-Na'am, an unrecognised village with a population of 5,000; Shaqib al-Salam established in 1979 as part of a government program of establishing permanent Bedouin settlements, population 6,500; Bir Hadaj, recognised in 2004, population 5,000.

== See also ==
- Israeli Bedouin
  - Galilee Bedouin
  - Negev Bedouin
- Palestinian Bedouin
