= Tel Arad, Israel =

Unrecognized Bedouin village in Israel

Coordinates: 31°17′31″N 35°08′42″E

Tel Arad تل عراد תל ערד
- Unrecognized village
- Interactive map of Tel Arad
- Location of Umm al-Hiran within Israel
- Country: Israel
- Established: 1951

Tel Arad (Hebrew: תל ערד Arabic: تل عراد) is an unrecognized Bedouin village, located north-west of the city of Arad, in southern Israel, with a population of 1,700 residents as of ca. 2020. The archeological site of Tel Arad, after which the village was named, is located nearby.

== History ==
During Mandatory Palestine, residents of the area were the Jahalin tribe, who were transferred from the Negev desert in 1951 by Israel, and now reside in the area of Mishor Adumim in the West Bank. After Israel's establishment, the state transferred to the Tel Arad area internally displaced Bedouin from other areas of the Negev, mostly from around Lakiya.

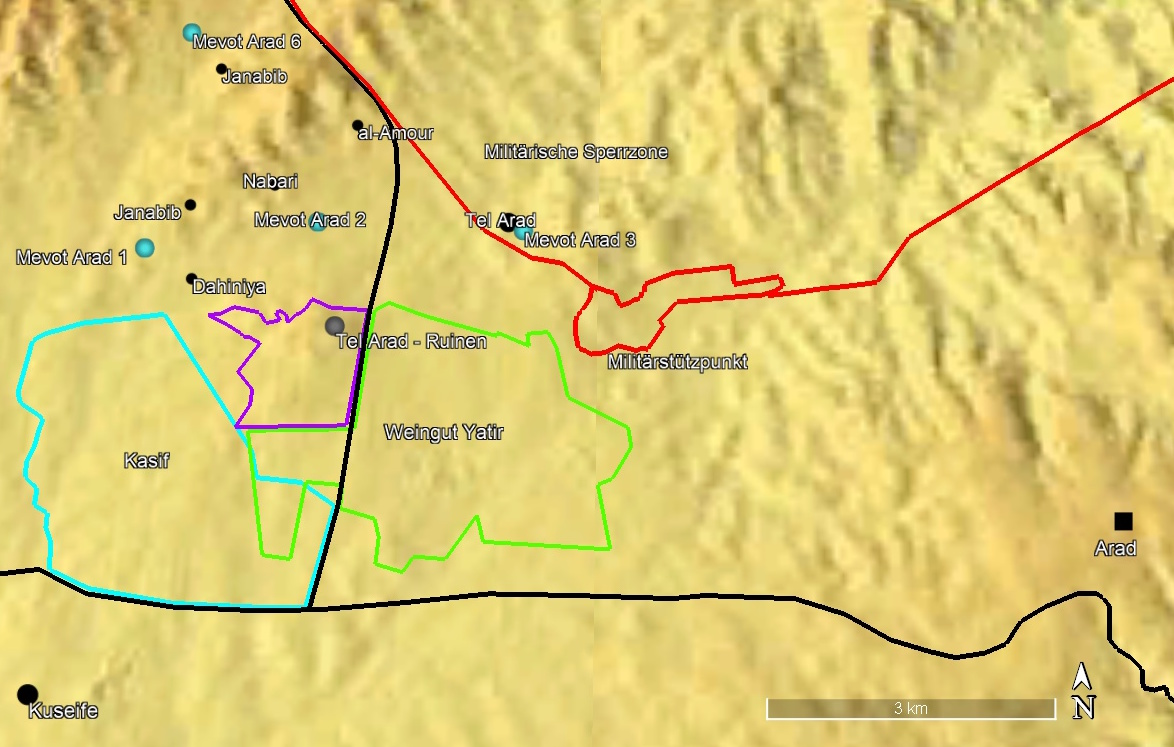
Tribal regions near Tel Arad

In the 1960s, Israel planned to further restrict the area occupied by the Negev Bedouins in the Siyag. In 1959, Israeli prime minister David Ben-Gurion announced his intention to present a plan within five years to concentrate the Bedouin in permanent settlements. The result of this legislative process was the 1965 Planning and Building Law, which created the legal basis for the phenomenon of Unrecognized Bedouin villages in Israel since the 2000s. The law designated most of the Siyag as agricultural land, retroactively declaring all old and new Bedouin settlements in the Siyag illegal. Beginning in 1968, Israel made efforts to concentrate the Bedouins into newly-built cities such as Tel Sheva, and later legally recognized individual villages. Tel Arad, however, remained an illegal settlement cleared for demolition.

Some residents from Tel Arad began leaving for these settlements. Some from the al-Sana tribe in Tel Arad moved to Tirabin al-Sana since it was a state-recognized settlement and also within tribal lands under the Bedouin legal system. Others left because of concerns of poor security in the village with Bedouin land rights not recognized in the village. The Israeli government did provide an option for Bedouins to lease or buy land near Lakiya with modern and state-subsidized housing in exchange for giving up territory in Tel Arad Some accepted this offer and moved to the city in 1975, but the first land plots were not allocated until 1985.

As a result, some have been living for decades in illegal huts outside city limits, which are not connected to public utility networks. As of 2017, there is no foreseeable solution that can address this situation in the short-term.

During the Twelve-Day War in June 2025, there were reports that Tel Arad and other Bedouin villages were not given proper bomb shelters from Iranian missiles, and many were forced to seek cover in areas with poor protection.
