= Goldberg Commission =

The Goldberg Commission, chaired by Eliezer Goldberg, was set up by the Israeli government in late 2007 to end the long-running land disputes between the state and Bedouin living in the Negev.

The Commission issued its report on 20 November 2011. It recommended that most of the 46 unrecognized villages east of Route 40 should be recognized on condition that they did not interfere with Israel's development plans in the area. It also recommended that most of the 50,000 illegally built structures in these villages should be legalized and that a committee be set up to hear and settle Bedouin claims relating to traditional land ownership.

The Commissions report was regarded as progressive by advocates for Bedouin rights in Israel.

In 2011 a second commission, the Prawer Commission, reported on how the Goldberg Commission proposals could be implemented. The Prawer plan would have involved the transfer of 30,000 villagers to government townships, but was cancelled in 2013 following significant protests from the Bedouin.
