= Grazing preference =

In United States agricultural policy, a grazing preference is the status of qualified holders of grazing permits acquired by grant, prior use, or purchase, that entitles them to special consideration over applicants who have not acquired preference.

A grazing privilege is the benefit or advantage enjoyed by a person or company beyond the common advantage of other citizens to graze livestock on federal lands. Privilege may be created by permit, license, lease, or agreement.

Grazing permits (or licenses or leases) provide this official written permission to graze a specific number, kind, and class of livestock for a specified time period on defined federal rangeland.
