= Bustan (organization) =

Israeli-Palestinian non-profit organization

Bustan (Arabic and Hebrew for "fruit garden") is a joint Israeli-Palestinian non-profit organization of eco-builders, architects, academics, and farmers who promotes environmental and social justice in Israel/Palestine. It uses tactics such as non-violent direct action and lobbying to improve the quality of life for marginalized populations that live in the region, most notably the Bedouin of unrecognized villages in the Negev desert of southern Israel. Bustan is an active part of the Together Forum, and works in partnership with the Regional Council of Unrecognized Villages (RCUV).

The organization was founded in 1999 by Devorah Brous.
