= Eliezer Goldberg =

Israeli judge and civil servant (1931–2022)

- אליעזר גולדברג
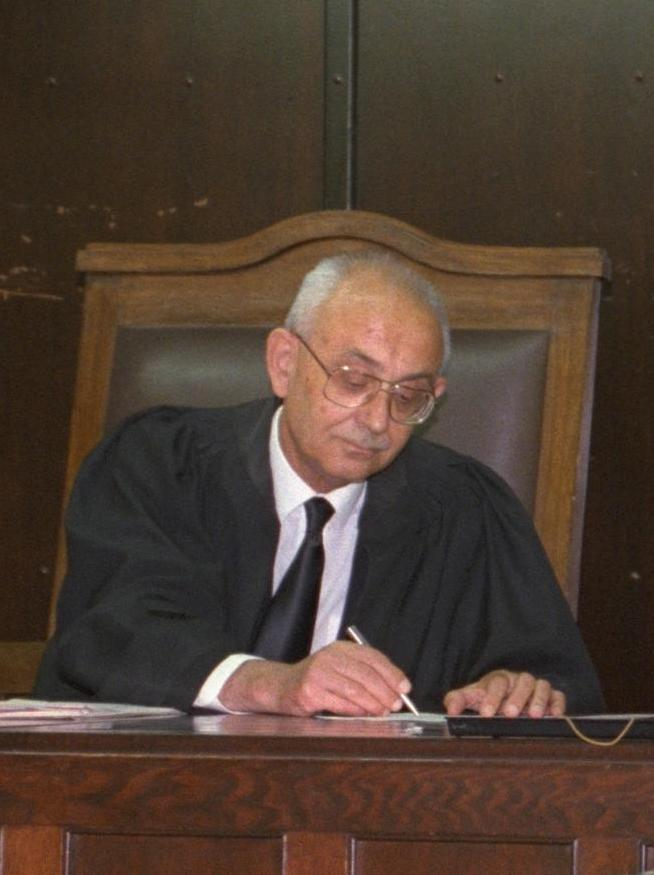
- Goldberg in 1992

Traffic Judge
- In office 1964–1965

Magistrate
- In office 1965–1974

District Judge
- In office 1974–1983

Supreme Court Judge
- In office 1983–1988

Chair of the Central Election Commission (the 12th Knesset)
- In office 1988–1998

State Comptroller of Israel
- In office 5 July 1998 – 4 July 2005
- Preceded by: Miriam Ben-Porat
- Succeeded by: Micha Lindenstrauss

Personal details
- Born: 24 May 1931 Jerusalem, Mandatory Palestine
- Died: 12 March 2022 (aged 90) Jerusalem, Israel
- Education: Hebrew University of Jerusalem

Eliezer Goldberg (Hebrew: אליעזר גולדברג; 24 May 1931 – 12 March 2022) was an Israeli judge and civil servant who served on the Supreme Court of Israel, and as the State Comptroller of Israel.

== Biography ==
Eliezer Goldberg was born in Jerusalem, Mandatory Palestine. There he attended the Hebrew Gymnasium Rehavia, graduating in 1949. From 1952 to 1955, he studied law in the Hebrew University of Jerusalem, where he specialized in the office of the president of the Jerusalem District Court.

Goldberg died on 12 March 2022, at the age of 90.

== Judicial career ==
From 1957 to 1964, Goldberg worked as a lawyer in a number of law firms. From 1964 to 1965, Goldberg served as a Traffic Judge. From 1965 to 1974, he served as Magistrate. In August 1974, he became a District Judge in the Jerusalem District Court, and in May 1982, he became its vice president. From March 1983 to March 1984, Goldberg served as Acting Supreme Court Judge. On 18 April 1984, he was appointed a Supreme Court Judge.

In 1988, Goldberg served as chair of the Central Election Commission (the 12th Knesset). He was a member, then chair, of the Committee for Criminal Jurisprudence Order. In 1994, he became a member in the Shamgar Commission (chaired by former Supreme Court president, Meir Shamgar) which investigated the Cave of the Patriarchs massacre. He also served in several other legal committees.

== State Comptroller ==
Goldberg was voted by the Knesset for a seven-year term as Israel's State Comptroller and Public Complaints Commissioner (from 5 July 1998 to 4 July 2005). On 18 May 2006, he received an esteem award from the influential Movement for Quality Government. From 2007 to 2011 he presided over the Goldberg Commission considering Bedouin land rights.
