= Dror =

Dror may refer to:

- Dror (name), a surname or given name
- Dror-Israel, an educational movement
- Dror light machine gun, an Israeli weapon
- Habonim Dror, a Jewish Labour Zionist youth movement
- Dror, Israel, a town in the Negev desert in Israel
