= Dror (name) =

Dror (Hebrew: דרור) is Hebrew for "freedom" or "sparrow" and may either be a surname or given name.

== Given name ==
- Dror Adani, Israeli convict
- Dror Bar-Natan (born 1966), Israeli mathematician
- Dror Benshetrit, Israeli artist, designer, and inventor
- Dror Biran (born 1977), Israeli pianist
- Dror Cohen (basketball) (born 1974), Israeli basketball coach and former player
- Dror Elimelech (born 1956), Israeli psychiatrist, psychotherapist, poet, and composer
- Dror Feiler (born 1951), Israeli-born Swedish musician, artist, and activist
- Dror Fixler, Israeli physicist
- Dror Green (born 1954), Israeli psychotherapist and author
- Dror Hajaj (born 1978), Israeli basketball player
- Dror Kashtan (1944–2024), Israeli footballer and manager
- Dror Mishani, (born 1975), Israeli crime writer, translator, and literary scholar
- Dror Moreh (born 1961), Israeli cinematographer and director
- Dror Paley (born 1956), Israeli-born Canadian orthopedic surgeon
- Dror Shaul (born 1971), Israeli filmmaker, commercial director, and film writer-director
- Dror Soref, Israeli-American filmmaker and social reformer
- Dror Stotzki, Israeli footballer
- Dror Toledano (born 1957), Israeli artist and photographer
- Dror Zahavi (born 1959), Israeli film director and screenwriter
- Dror Zeigerman (born 1948), Israeli politician and diplomat

== Surname ==
Note: Some Israelis hebraicized the Ashkenazi surname Friedman to Dror

- David M. Dror, health insurance specialist
- Duki Dror (born 1963), Israeli filmmaker
- Inbal Dror (born 1979), Israeli fashion designer
- Rachel Dror (1921–2024), Israeli-German teacher and Holocaust survivor
- Shmuel Ben-Dror (1924–2009), Israeli footballer
- Yehezkel Dror (1928–2026), Austrian-born Israeli political scientist and academic
- Zvi Dror (1926–2025), Israeli historian

== Location ==
- Dror, Israel, a town in Israel

== See also ==
- Drori
