= Drori =

Drori, sometimes spelled as Drory, is a surname that is possibly a variation of the English surname Drury, or Drewry. Notable people with this surname include:

- Ze'ev Drori (born 1940), American technology entrepreneur
- Erann DD, officially Erann David Drori (born 1967), Danish singer-songwriter
- Amir Drori (1937–2005), Israeli general
- Avraham Drori (1919–1965), Israeli politician
- Hasya Drori (1899–1976), Israeli politician
- Mordechai Drory (1931–2020) Israeli diplomat
- Nili Drori (born 1960), Israeli Olympic fencer
- Ofir Drori (born 1976), Israeli animal rights activist.
- Zephaniah Drori (born 1937), Israeli rabbi

Jonathan Drori, a British scientist, is another person with that surname.

== See also ==
- Dror (name)

Sources: https://omeka.library.kent.edu/special-collections/items/show/11471

        https://www.shutterstock.com/editorial/image-editorial/thomas-drory-strangles-jael-denny-he-hanged-9845025a
