= Umm al-Hiran =

Unrecognized Bedouin village in Israel

Umm al-Hiran أم الحيران אום אל-חיראן
- Unrecognized village
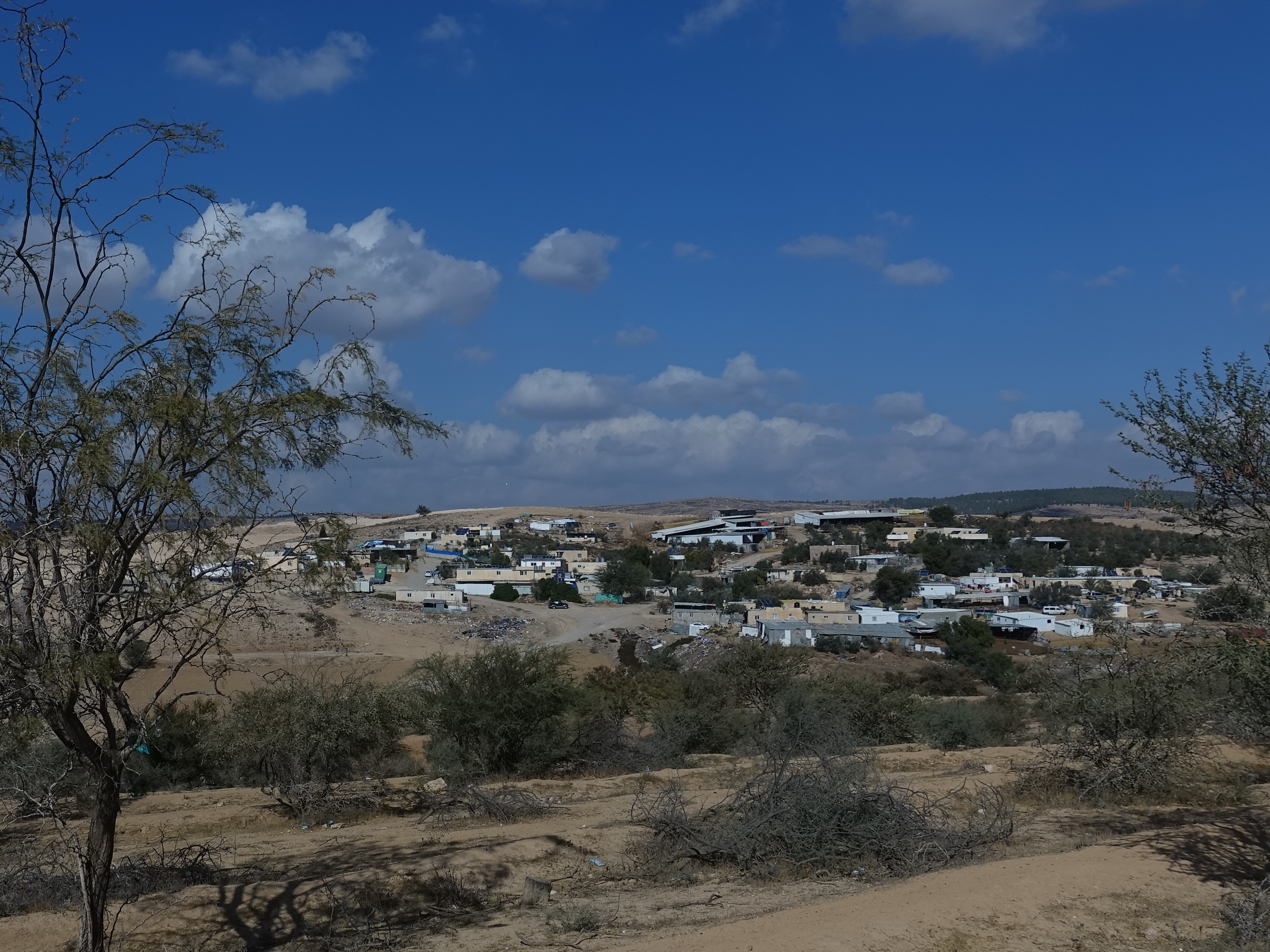
- Umm al-Hiran, 2017
- Interactive map of Umm al-Hiran
- Location of Umm al-Hiran within Israel
- Coordinates: 31°18′56″N 34°59′48″E
- Country: Israel
- Established: 1956
- Demolished: 2024

Umm al-Hiran (Arabic: أم الحيران; Hebrew: אום אל-חיראן) was a Bedouin village settled by Arab-Israeli citizens of the Abu Alkian tribe located in the Wadi Atir area of the Negev desert in southern Israel. Located near Hura, the village was established in 1956 and is one of 46 unrecognized Bedouin villages in Israel. In November 2024 the Government of Israel demolished the village as part of its plan of replacing it with a Jewish settlement called Dror, which has been described as "ethnic cleansing" and "systematic population replacement program" by the Regional Council for Unrecognized Villages.

== Etymology ==
The village is named after the Hiran Valley that passes near the village, as well as the adjacent Hiran mountain.

== Geography ==
Umm al-Hiran-Atir is located in the Wadi Atir area of the Negev desert, eight kilometres north-east of the Bedouin township of Hura. It is part of the same valley as Susiya, a Palestinian village in the West Bank at risk of demolition.

== History ==
=== 20th century: Foundation ===
During and following the 1948 Palestine war and the establishment of the state of Israel, a large number of Bedouin tribes were displaced, including the Abu Alkian tribe. They were corralled into an area known as Siyag to the northeast of Beersheba, which was designated a closed military zone, barring Bedouins from accessing their original land. In 1956, the tribe approached the military administration and was transferred to the Yatir area, where they received 7,000 dunams of land near the wadi. There, they settled in two villages Umm al-Hiran and Atir. From this point onwards, they built houses from stone and other materials, paved roads, built wells and farmed the surrounding land. Sheikh Farhoud Abu al Qi'an argued that before their arrival "It was a desert, with no roads, water, houses or services".

=== 21st century: Demolition plans and actions ===
==== 2000s ====
In 2001, the Israel Land Authority described its residents as a "special obstacle" in its recommendations. In 2003, there was a state motion to the Magistrates’ Court in Beersheba for the demolition of the village ex parte, without informing the landowners; the state claimed that it was unable to identify or reach the inhabitants. In 2004, the state filed lawsuits in 2004 to evacuate the villagers on the basis that they were trespassers who were squatting illegally. The court ruled that the legal status of the residents was as "permanent residents", but at the same time concluded that because the land was held from the state free of charge, their residency could be revoked at any time. The Prime Minister's Office had also previously blocked a plan to recognise the neighbouring village of Atir, which shares land with Umm al-Hiran, requesting instead that the plan did not clash with the proposal to establish a Jewish town.

The proposal would relocate the Bedouins of Umm al-Hiran to the Bedouin township of Hura, one of seven Bedouin townships, all of which are at the bottom of the country's socio-economic index. These townships are specifically designated towns intended to "contain" expelled Bedouins. They are characterised by being overcrowded, lacking in adequate services and having the highest percentage of unemployment and poverty in Israel.

The authorities are supported by key NGOs, including the Or Movement, which works to promote the construction of Hiran. Opposition to the plan to forcibly evict and demolish the village of Umm al-Hiran has come from both non-governmental organisations and left-leaning MKs. Arab MKs have requested an overall solution to the Arab and Bedouin housing problem in Israel, including a freeze on all pending demolition and eviction orders. Ayman Odeh, the leader of the Joint List, made the housing crisis and treatment of Bedouins his party's top priority following the March 2015 elections. Other MKs have also come out in opposition to the plan, including MK Tamar Zandberg from Meretz, who argued "How will we be able to explain how we razed a village… just because the people belong to a different ethnic or religious group?" Adalah launched a public campaign entitled "#save_UmmAlHiran", in order to "stop Israel's plan to demolish an Arab Bedouin village in order to build a Jewish town over its ruins". The Regional Council of the Unrecognised Villages has also been active in campaigning to stop the destruction of the village, arguing the plan amounts to an "ethnic cleansing" campaign.

==== 2010s ====
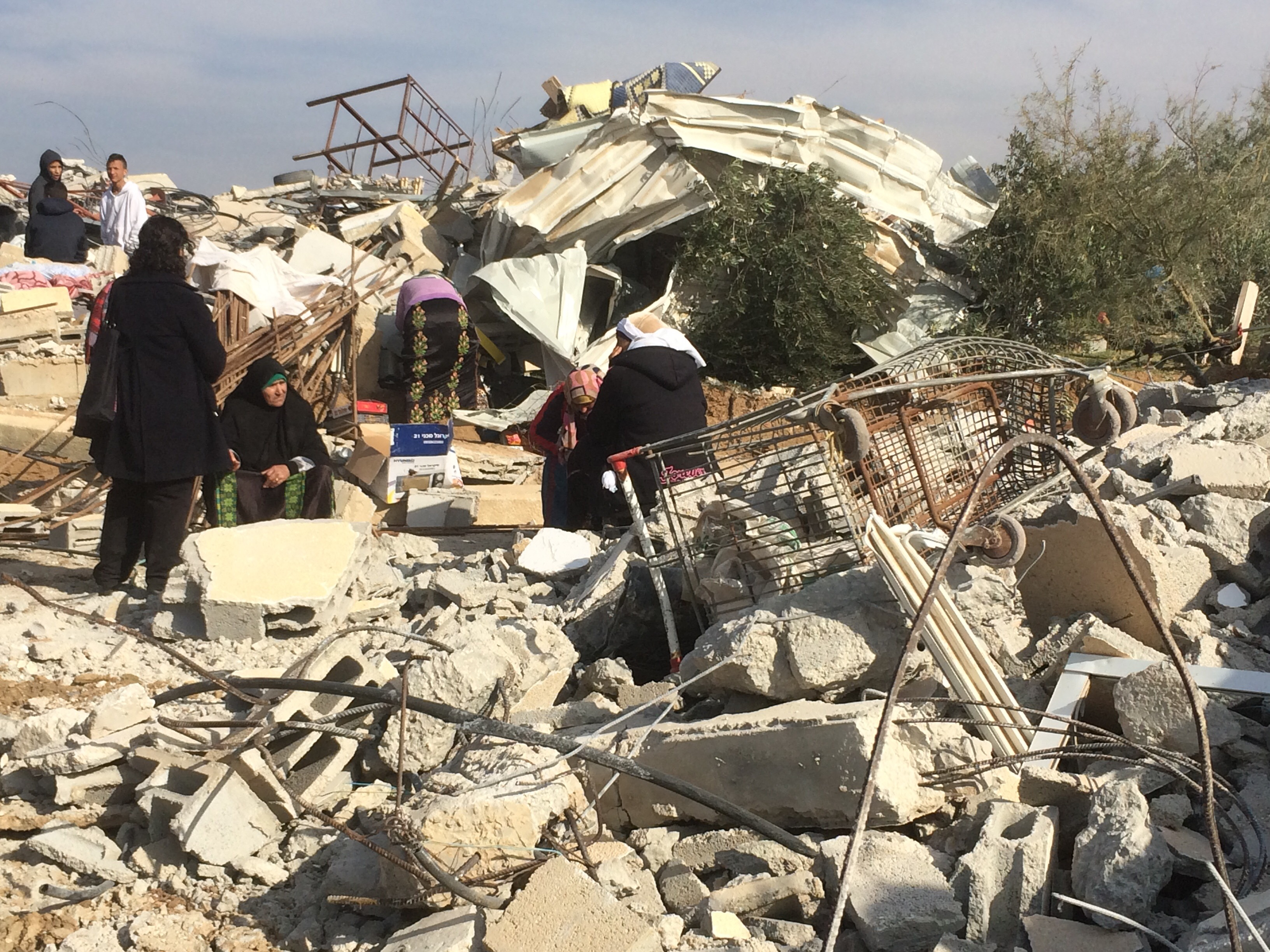
Houses demolition in Umm al-Hiran, 18 January 2017

Two legal proceedings were started against the villagers of Umm al-Hiran by the State Attorney; one to evacuate the village, and one to demolish the village itself. A petition from late May 2015 was rejected by the Supreme Court, with Justice Elyakim Rubinstein arguing that the petition was an indirect attack against the establishment of the new Jewish town, Hiran, a challenge which should be raised elsewhere. It was further argued that the government's action did not violate the community's legal rights, and that the "proportionate harm" that would be caused by the evictions and demolitions was within acceptable boundaries. Furthermore, members of the Knesset voted 24–1 against sending the issue of Umm al-Hiran to its Internal Affairs and Environment Committee. The newly appointed Justice Minister, Ayelet Shaked, argued that the demolitions did not reflect discrimination against Bedouins or Arabs, but that since the village was unrecognised, its residents were not eligible for any compensation. Supreme Court Justice Daphne Barak Erez criticised the government's actions, arguing that it should reconsider the proposed compensation, given the Bedouins had lived in Umm al-Hiran for decades. She proposed considering offering a plot in the new town for the existing residents.

On 11 June 2015, hundreds of protesters attended a demonstration against the destruction of Umm al-Hiran in Beersheba. They marched from the town's open-air Bedouin market to the city's government buildings. The demonstration was attended by Joint List MKs Ahmad Tibi, Hanin Zoabi and Taleb Abu Arar.

In 2015 Neve Gordon wrote of his impressions of the contrast between the two communities. The community that is to form the projected village of Hiran consists of roughly 30 religious families living in a gated community in a Jewish National Fund Forest some kilometres away from the Bedouin village. They are former West Bank settlers who, he states, 'have returned to Israel to colonise Bedouin land. The rooster has come back home to roost.'

Before dawn on January 18, 2017 when Israeli police officers and a Green Patrol of the Israel Land Authority arrived at the village to demolish homes. They were met by a large group of protesters. A villager, the 47-year-old school teacher Yacoub Abu Al-Qia’an, was shot by police while driving away from the scene, and his car subsequently careened into a group of police, ramming and killing an officer. Abu Al-Qia'an was left unattended and bled to death. In the immediate aftermath, several Israeli politicians and police officials falsely accused Abu Al-Qia'an of having been a terrorist affiliated with the Islamic State. In 2020, his name was cleared as Israeli Prime Minister Benjamin Netanyahu and others apologized for making him out to be a terrorist. The police and the State Prosecutor were faulted for covering up evidence that would have cleared Abu Al-Qia’an's name sooner, among other things.

== Demographics ==
In 2015 the population of the village was just over 1,000, having grown from around 200 in 1956 when it was established. The community of Umm al-Hiran is part of the Abu al Qi'an tribe, originally from Khirbet Zubaleh and belong to the Sunni branch of Islam.

== Economy ==
Residents work primarily in two industries; construction (specifically in paving roads) and as manpower contractors, cleaning hospitals and working in factories.

== Education ==
The children of Umm al-Hiran attend school in Hura.
