= Muhammad Al-Nabari =

Israeli politician

- محمد النباري מחמד אלנבארי
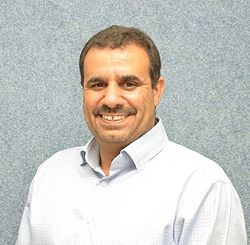

Mayor of Hura
- In office 2004–2018

Personal details
- Born: محمد النباري; 22 February 1970 (age 56) Hura, Israel
- Children: 6
- Education: Hebrew University of Jerusalem, Ben-Gurion University of the Negev

Dr. Muhammad Al-Nabari (Arabic: محمد النباري, Hebrew: מחמד אלנבארי; born 22 February 1970) is a Bedouin citizen of Israel, who served as the mayor of Hura, a Bedouin village in the south of Israel. He was elected in 2004, when he was only 34 years old. During his tenure, Al-Nabari successfully decreased the unemployment rate, improved the education system and developed four models to provide employment for the men and women of Hura. Al-Nabari received the Movement for Quality Government in Israel award, for local government for his achievements in Hura.

== Biography ==
Muhammad Al-Nabari was born in Hura. At a young age he decided to move away from his home town, and to study in one of the best Arab schools in Israel back then, which was located in Baqa-Jatt. When Al-Nabari finished school he worked in fruit-picking for one year, then he enrolled in the Hebrew University of Jerusalem to study Chemistry. He continued his studies and earned a master's degree in chemistry at the Hebrew University of Jerusalem and then moved on to do his Ph.D. in the Ben-Gurion University of the Negev. He is married and has six kids.

Al-Nabari did his Ph.D. in the subject of Organic chemistry under the guidance of Prof. Shmuel Bittner. His doctorate title was Synthesis of Natural Products, Quinones Enaminones.

Al-Nabari finished his academic period and went to work for a pharmaceutical company called ChemAgis (now Perrigo). During his time in the academia and at work Al-Nabari registered 12 patents, some of them for treatments of Alzheimer's disease and brain cancer.

Patents List:

1. Process for preparing temozolomide, patent No. 7,612,202, 2009
2. Use of purified donepezil maleate for preparing pharmaceutically pure amorphous donepezil hydrochloride, patent No. 7,592,459, 2009.
3. Stable amorphous forms of montelukast sodium, patent No. 7,544,805, 2009.
4. Process for preparing temozolomide, patent No. 2006/0183,898, 2006.
5. Use of purified donepezil maleate for preparing pharmaceutically pure amorphous donepezil hydrochloride, patent No. 2006/0069,125, 2006.
6. Process for alkylating secondary amines and the use in donepezil preparation thereof, patent No. 2006/0122,227, 2006.
7. Novel processes for preparing substantially pure anastrozole, patent No. 2006/0035,950, 2006.
8. Synthesis and powder preparation of fluticasone propionate, Patent No. 2006/0009,435, 2006.
9. Stable amorphous forms of montelukast sodium, patent No. 2005/0187,245, 2005.
10. Solid amorphous mixtures, processes for the preparation thereof and pharmaceutical compositions containing the same, patent No. 2005/0142,190, 2005.
11. Process for the preparation of donepezil, patent No. 6,844,440, 2005.
12. Process for the preparation of donepezil, patent No. 2004/0048,893, 2004.

== Political career ==
Al-Nabari entered politics in 2004 when he was elected as the mayor of Hura. He received a lot of media coverage due to the radical changes and innovative initiatives he introduced to Hura. When he entered the office in 2004 the municipal tax collection rate was 2%; in 2015 it was 86%. The budget of the municipality in 2004 was 29 million shekels, but in 2015 it was already 132 million shekels. Al-Nabari also built a sewage purification institute, started a catering social business that employs single mothers, and opened a call center that employs young Bedouin students. He created a municipal business corporation; initiated a project called Wadi Attir together with Dr. Michael Ben-Eli, which is a unique sustainable agriculture enterprise; and started a high school for intellectually gifted children in Hura.

Al-Nabari is also the founder of the young Bedouin leadership program called Desert Stars. He serves in the management board of The Abraham Fund Initiatives and as a Trustee in the Sapir Academic College.

== See also ==
- Politics of Israel
- Bedouin music
- Negev Bedouin
- Negev Bedouin women
- List of Arab citizens of Israel
