= Abu Alkian =

Negev Bedouin tribe

The Abu Alkian (Arabic: alhomran, Hebrew: אבו-אלקיעאן) is a tribe living in the Negev desert in southern Israel.

== History ==
The Abu Alkian tribe arrived in Negev at the end of the 19th century. Their name translates to "Valley people". Tribe leaders made an agreement with a local El Huzayil Bedouin tribe and settled Khirbet Zubaleh in Wadi Zubaleh, northwest of where Rahat is situated today. Following the 1948 war and the establishment of the State of Israel, the tribe moved into an enclosed zone northeast of Beersheba. According to Haaretz, the tribe moved to escape a conflict with a neighboring tribe, but according to Adalah, the military governor of the Negev forced the tribe to move. In 1956, the tribe approached the military administration and was transferred to the Wadi Atir area where they received 7,000 dunams of land near the wadi. There, they settled in two villages Umm al-Hiran and Atir.

== Present day ==
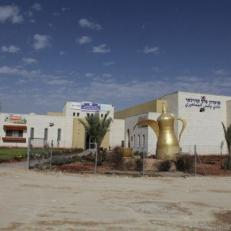
Houra school and a local community center

In 2012, the lion's share of the Abu Alkian tribe, about 75% of 4,300 people, lived in the Bedouin town Hura (Houra). The remaining, about 1,000, lived in the villages Atir and Umm al-Hiran. The Israeli authorities classify them as "unrecognized villages" built illegally. Umm al-Hiran has since been demolished and the Bedouins have moved to Hura.

=== Hura ===
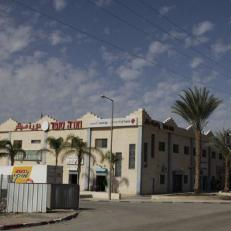
Industrial park in Hura

Israel has spent tens of millions of shekels on a program to settle members of the tribe in a planned neighborhood of Hura built especially for them. It is one of seven Bedouin townships in the Negev desert with approved plans and developed infrastructure (other six are: Ar'arat an-Naqab (Ar'ara BaNegev), Lakiya, Shaqib al-Salam (Segev Shalom), Kuseife (Kseife), Tel as-Sabi (Tel-Sheva) and the city of Rahat, the largest among them).

They were built in order to sedentarize Negev Bedouin and provide them with all the basic services, like work, education, medical infrastructure, etc. There is an industrial park in Hura, 8 schools, branches of several health funds (medical clinics), and several community centers. A number of community projects were initiated here in order to fight female unemployment.

=== Dispersion ===
About 1,000 tribe members live in two unrecognized villages: Atir and Um al-Hiran. Since the municipal status of these villages is not recognized by the state, they don't have basic infrastructure: electricity supply, running water or sewerage. Abu Alkian tribe members living in dispersion have been offered to move into Houra and receive different benefits, for example, land lots at low prices. Nevertheless, they are reluctant to change their residence.

In 2017, one member of the tribe, Yacoub Abu Al-Qia'an, was killed by Israeli police as authorities were preparing to demolish his and other villagers homes in Umm al-Hiran.

== See also ==
- Hura
- Negev Bedouin
- Sedentarization
