= HaNoar HaOved VeHaLomed =

Israeli youth organization

HaNoar HaOved VeHaLomed הסתדרות הנוער העובד והלומד
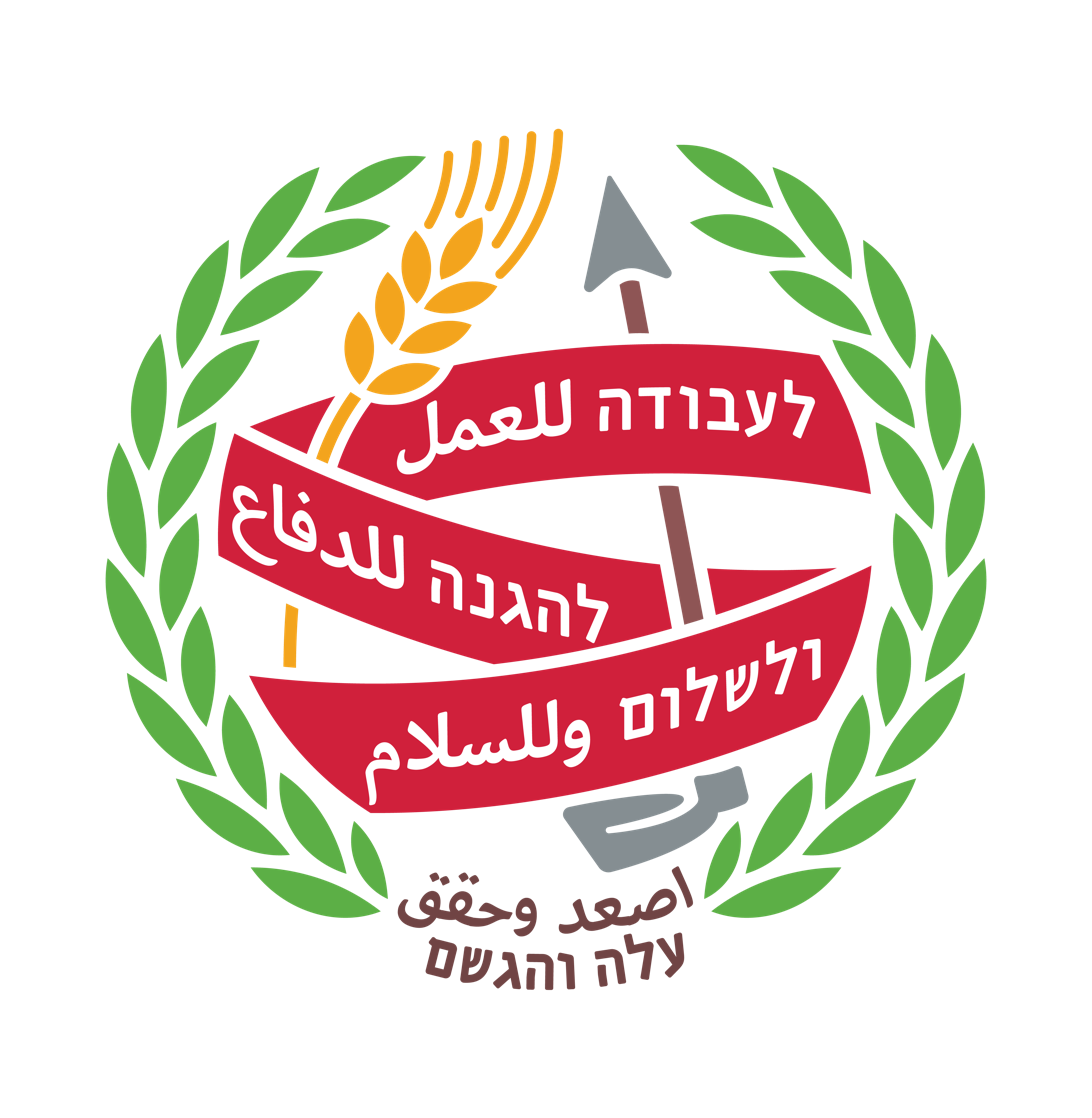
- Formation: 1924
- Type: Jewish Labour Zionist youth movement
- Purpose: Educational
- Location: Israel
- Members: 95,000
- General Secretary: Maya Geva
- Parent organization: Histadrut; Dror-Israel
- Website: noal.org.il

Histadrut HaNoar HaOved VeHaLomed (Hebrew: הסתדרות הנוער העובד והלומד, lit. 'Federation of Young Students and Workers', Arabic: حركة الشبيبة العاملة والمتعلمة), most commonly translated as Working and Studying Youth and colloquially known as Noar HaOved and abbreviated No'al (נוֹעַ"ל), is an Israeli youth movement, a sister movement of Habonim Dror, and affiliated with the Labor Zionist movement. The organisation was a member of the International Falcon Movement – Socialist Educational International.

== History ==
HaNoar HaOved VeHaLomed was founded in 1924. Initially it was called HaNoar HaOved ("Working Youth") and affiliated with the Histadrut. In 1959, the group joined HaTnua HaMeuhedet ("The United Movement") and the name was changed to HaNoar HaOved VeHaLomed.

In the 1990s, along with the decline of the kibbutz movement, HaNoar HaOved VeHaLomed began re-examining the ideal life path of its members, which had always began settling kibbutzim in gar'inim after finishing their mandatory period of army service. Instead, a model started to be put forward in which bogrim ("graduates") of the movement formed small urban communes working in the community, particularly in education. Today, there are about 1,000 members of HaNoar HaOved VeHaLomed's Tnuat Bogrim ("Movement of Graduates") living in small communes in cities or kibbutzim and working in the community, mostly in education and the youth movement. The youth movement and the Tnuat Bogrim are called Dror Israel movement, which is named after the historical Dror movement in Europe.

Some of the graduates of the movement have become Knesset members, prime ministers, and presidents, such as Yitzhak Rabin, Shimon Peres and Moshe Ya'alon.

== Goals of membership ==
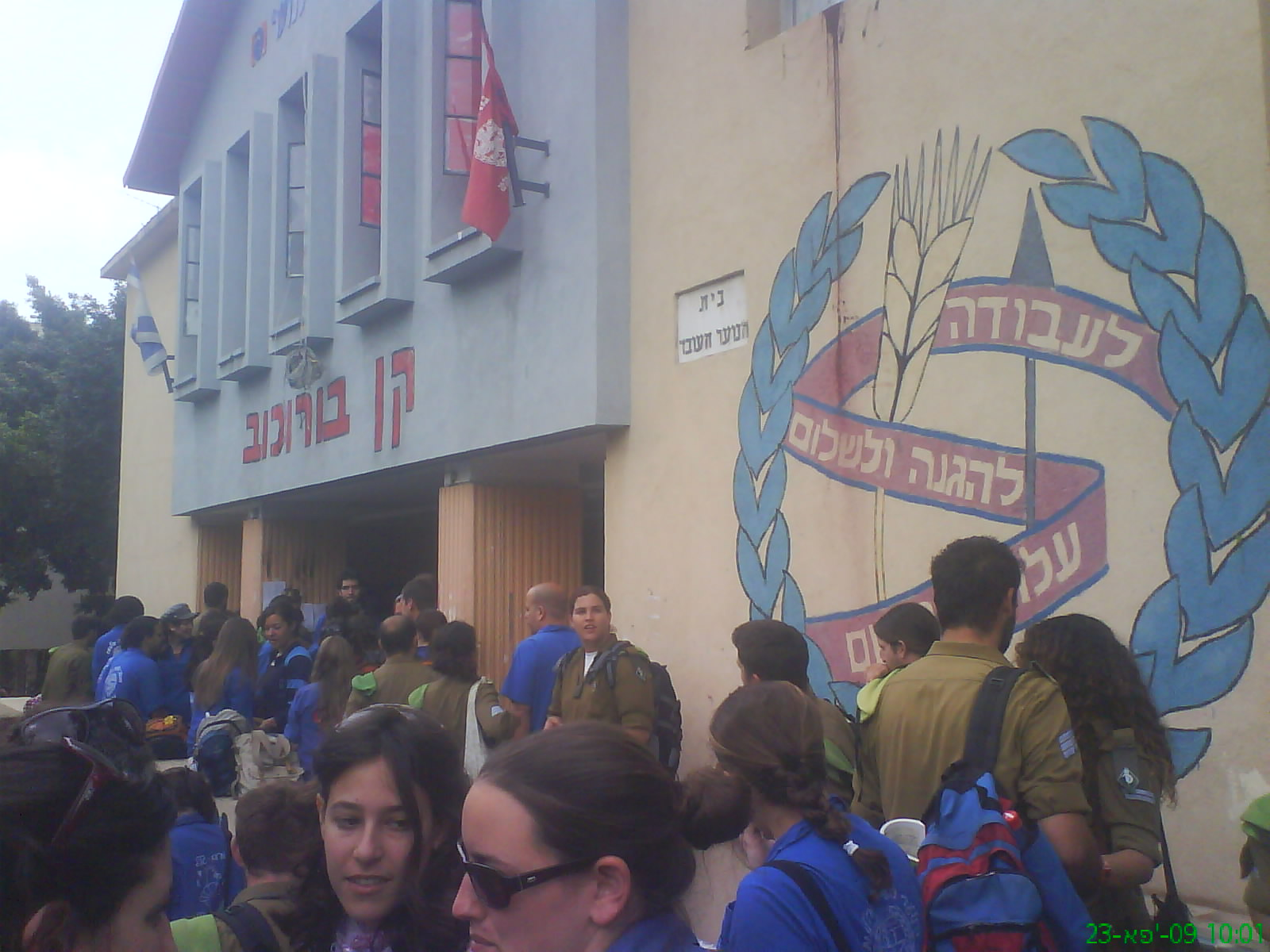
The "Ken" (club) of the HaNoar HaOved VeHaLomed in Givataim in Borochov neighborhood

The movement aims that each member aspires to the following goals:

1. A movement graduate who sees the human being and his happiness as the central foundation of his creation and lives by this belief.
2. A movement graduate who stands for democratic and socialist principles.
3. A movement graduate who sees in the Jewish tradition a source of inspiration and influence, not a source of authority.
4. A movement graduate whose own responsibility and criticism are the foundations of his life conception and life-style's consolidation.
5. A movement graduate who bases his material and cultural existence on his own creation.
6. A movement graduate who is involved and active in social changing processes led by his beliefs and concepts.
7. A movement graduate whose ambition is to live in the state of Israel and takes part in its defense and building.
8. A movement graduate whose ambition is to live on a Kibbutz or in any other socialist and cooperative way of living.

== Organizational structure ==
HaNoar HaOved VeHaLomed consists different branches. Each branch has unique activities but all share the same virtues and ideology. The branches are being referred to as nests, or kenim in Hebrew.

- HaKen HaEroni (the urban nest) – Its activities are being held in many cities and towns in Israel, from Rosh Hanikra in the north, to Mitzpe Ramon in the south.
- Bney Hamoshavim Unit – The unit used to be active only in Moshavim but today its activities are being held in Kibbutzim and other forms of settlement. The unit works in many regional councils, from Golan to the north to Central Arava to the south. the unit was founded by the Moshavim Movement, to provide activities for the kids. In 1935 it became a part of HaNoar HaOved VeHaLomed. Bney HaMoshavim is different from other youth movements in israel in their definition of a member – every kid that lives in the settlement, where the unit works, is considered to be a member, and the unit struggles to bring all the kids to their activities. in accordance with that principle, Bney HaMoshavim does not collect money from its members, but takes its budget from the youth budget of the regional council and the Settlement committee.
- Haken Hakibbutzi – Works in Kibbutzim along Israel, and works together with Kibbutz Institutions.
- Haken Haaravi (The Arab Nest) – Works in Arab settlements in Israel, including East Jerusalem.
- HaKen HaDruzi (The Druze Nest) – Works in all the Druze Settlements in Israel.

== Uniforms ==
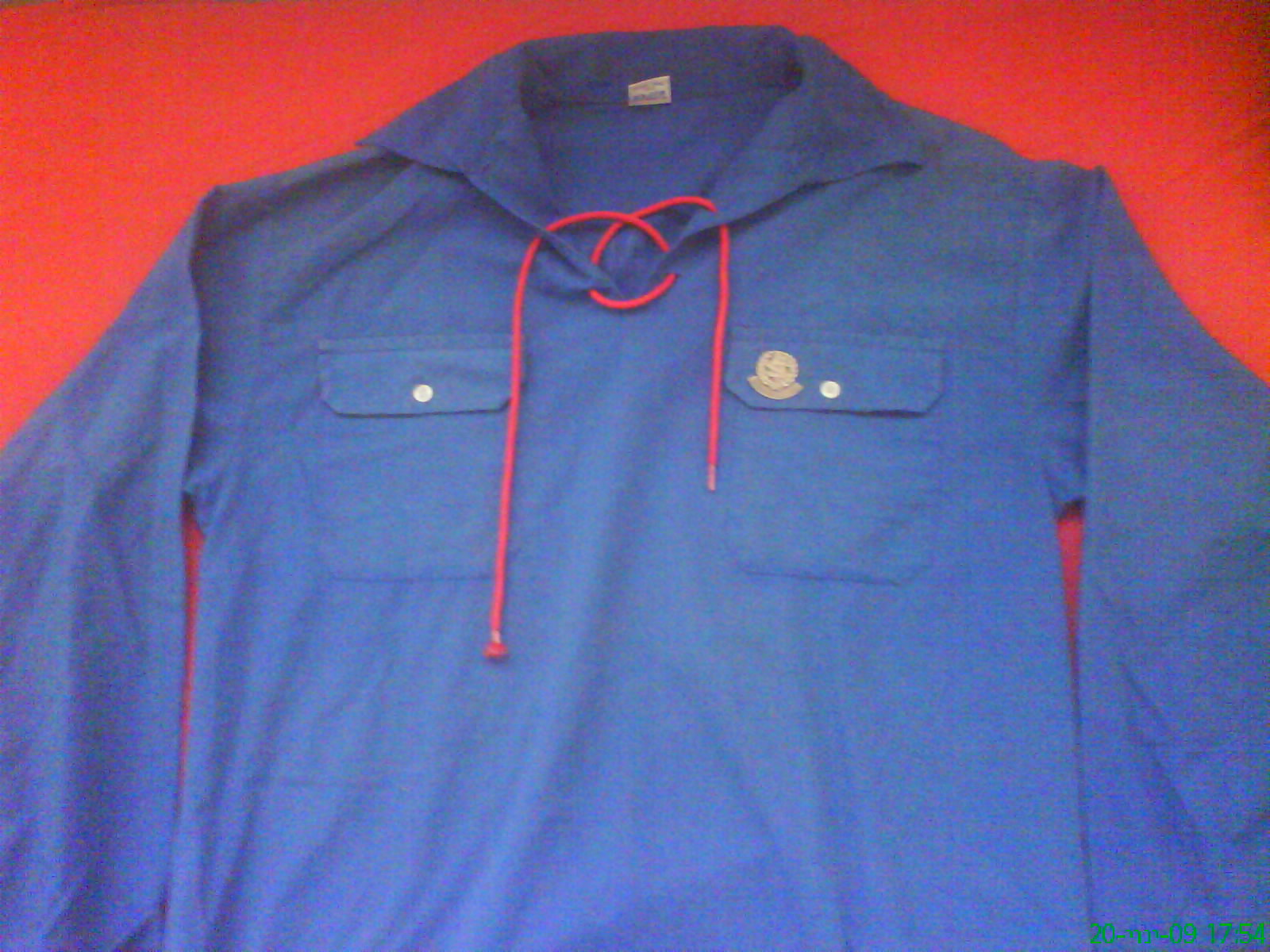
HaNoar HaOved VeHaLomed uniforms

The uniform of the HaNoar HaOved VeHaLomed is a blue shirt (Blue collar) which symbolizes the working class, with red lacing which symbolizes socialism.

== See also ==
- Culture of Israel
- Hashomer Hatzair, a similar youth movement but further to the left
- Socialist Zionism
- Zionist youth movement
