= Amos Wilnai =

American-Israeli philanthropist (born 1939)

Amos Wilnai (Hebrew: עמוס וילנאי; born 1939) is an Israeli-American electrical engineer, hi-tech executive, entrepreneur, and philanthropist. He taught at the Technion, Israel Institute of Technology (1973), and was part of the founding team and led chip design at both Intel Israel (1974) and National Semiconductor Israel (1978).

In 1982 he founded Clarity Ltd. of Herzliya, Israel, and in 1997 founded MMC Networks of Sunnyvale, California.

== Career ==
Wilnai holds a B.Sc. degree in electrical Engineering from the Technion, Israel Institute of Technology (1964), and an M.S. degree in Electrical Engineering from the Polytechnic Institute of Brooklyn (1966).

In 1970 he joined Monolithic Memories Inc. (MMI) of Sunnyvale, California where he designed and introduced a new MOS product line.

In July 1967 Wilnai joined the R&D division of Signetics Corp. an early semiconductor company (then a Corning Glass’ subsidiary), where he studied bipolar and MOS processes and designed for Signetics’ a new MOS-based product line.

In July 1974 Wilnai joined Intel’s Israeli Design Center in Haifa at its inception.

In 1978 he moved to National Semiconductor to establish its newly formed chip design center in Herzliya.

In 1982 Wilnai founded and was the CEO of Clarity Ltd. (initially named Softel) of Herzliya, Israel.

=== MMC Networks ===
In 1992 Wilnai founded MMC Networks of Sunnyvale California and was its active Chairman and interim CEO. The Company started as a bootstrap operation, received first round VC funding ($3.1M) in 1994, went public on NASDAQ in 1997, and was acquired in 2000 by Applied Micro Circuits Corporation (AMCC) of San Diego, California for $4.5 Billion (a deal billed by the press as the second largest in semiconductor history).

== Charity ==
In 2006 Wilnai established with his wife Ruth the Amos and Ruth Wilnai Foundation, a non-profit charitable California organization that focuses on advancing underprivileged children and at-risk youth, and on social change. Wilnai is currently President of the Amos & Ruth Wilnai Foundation.

== Publications ==
- “Stratified Media Optic Cavitiesיי, (M.S. thesis), presented at the 1965 Winter Meeting of the America Physical Society, UCLA, December 20–22, 1965.
- Open-Ended RC Line Model Predicts MOSFET IC Response, EDN/EEE, December 15, 1971.
- Logic Driving Gates Double as D-A converter switches, Electronics, August 14, 1972.
- Finding MOSFET Threshold with One Measurement, Electronics, September 11, 1972.
- Eliminating Clock Waveform Imperfections in MOS Dynamic Circuits, Computer Design, September 1973
- Design Consideration for Scanned Photodiode Arrays, Symposium on Microwaves, Antennas and Electron Devices, Tel Aviv, April 2–3, 1974 (with Prof. Yitzhak Kidron)
