= Dror Fixler =

Israeli physicist specializing in optics

- דרור פיקסלר
- Citizenship: Israeli
- Scientific career
- Fields: Nanophotonics, Electrical engineering
- Workplaces: Bar Ilan University

Dror Fixler (Hebrew: דרור פיקסלר) is an Israeli physicist specializing in optics. Since 2026 he is a Full Professor in Tel Aviv University. He was the director of the Bar-Ilan institute of nanotechnology and advanced materials, a Professor of Electrical engineering and Nanophotonics at Bar-Ilan University in Ramat Gan, Israel. He is also a visiting professor in Technical Institute of Physics and Chemistry, China. He is also an Israeli Orthodox rabbi and posek, and a student of Rabbi Nahum Eliezer Rabinovitch.

Fixler is a member of the Nano Photonics Center at the Institute of Nanotechnology and Advanced Materials, and a Lecturer at the Faculty of Engineering.

In 2015, Fixler received European Science Foundation’s Plasmon-Bionanosense Award.

In 2017, Fixler received the President's International Fellowship Initiative Award of the Chinese Academy of Sciences (CAS).

== Research ==
Fixler is expert in electro-optics and photonics research including the emission, transmission, detection and sensing of light for biomedical properties.
