= Dror-Israel =

Israeli youth organization

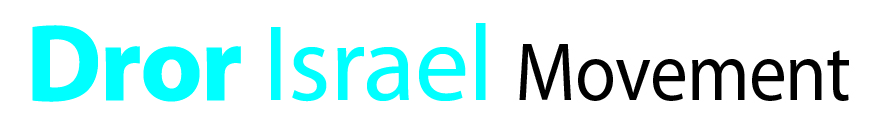
Dror-Israel logo

Dror-Israel (Hebrew: דרור-ישראל) is a Zionist youth movement in the State of Israel. It operates schools, youth programs, community projects, and social initiatives aimed at engaging young people and communities in various parts of Israel, particularly in the social and geographic periphery.

== History ==
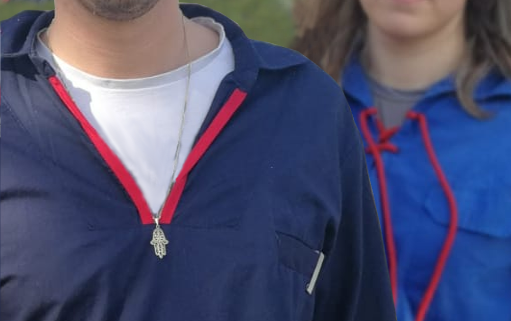
Dror Israel's shirt (left) takes inspiration from the Hanoar Haoved Ve'Halomed Youth Movement's shirt (right). The blue that symbolises the working class is darker and the red string is replaced by a red V collar.

Dror Israel was founded in 2006 by graduates of HaNoar HaOved VeHaLomed (Hebrew: הנוער העובד והלומד, "The Working and Studying Youth"), a Labor Zionist youth movement established in 1924. Between the 1930s and 1980s, HaNoar HaOved VeHaLomed founded more than one hundred kibbutzim.

By the 1990s, amid the decline of the kibbutz movement, the youth movement re-examined its model of encouraging graduates to settle in rural kibbutzim following mandatory military service in the Israel Defense Forces. Instead, groups of graduates began forming small urban communes focused on educational and community work. Dror Israel was founded as an umbrella organization for these initiatives, incorporating HaNoar HaOved VeHaLomed as its youth movement.

The organization is named after the historical Dror Zionist youth movement.

== Structure and membership ==
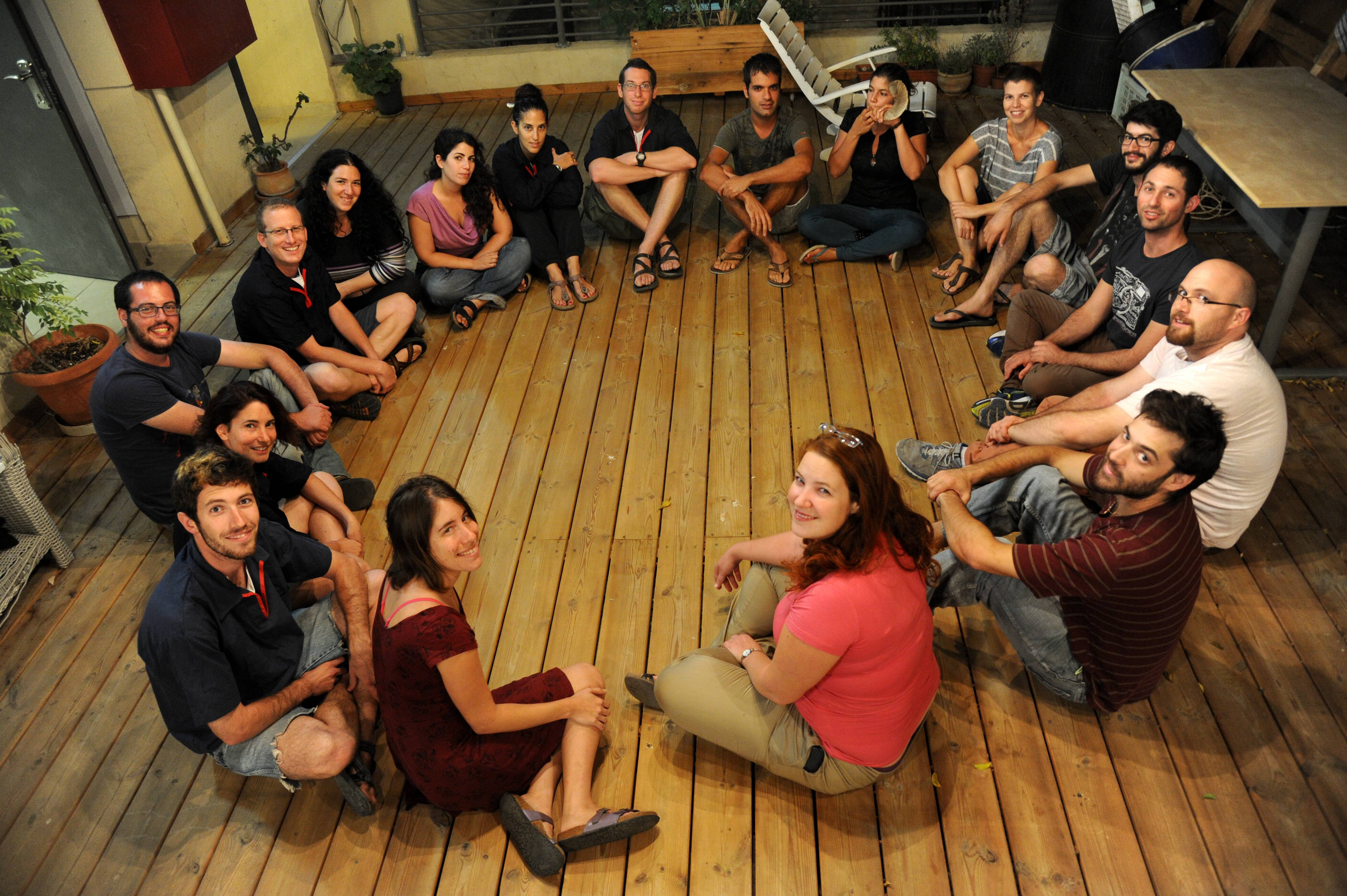
Sukkot at Dror Israel's Educators' Kibbutz in Beer Sheva

As of 2014, Dror Israel reported approximately 1,200 members aged 20–40, primarily graduates of HaNoar HaOved VeHaLomed, living in small communal groups or "educators' kibbutzim" throughout Israel. Each group typically consists of 30 to 100 members who engage in local educational, social, and cultural activities.

According to the organization, its activities reach more than 100,000 people annually.

== Activities ==
=== Work with youth ===
Dror Israel operates educational centers for children and youth, including seven high schools, two boarding schools, and several after-school centers. Programs target young people in disadvantaged communities, with a focus on life skills, vocational training, and leadership development.

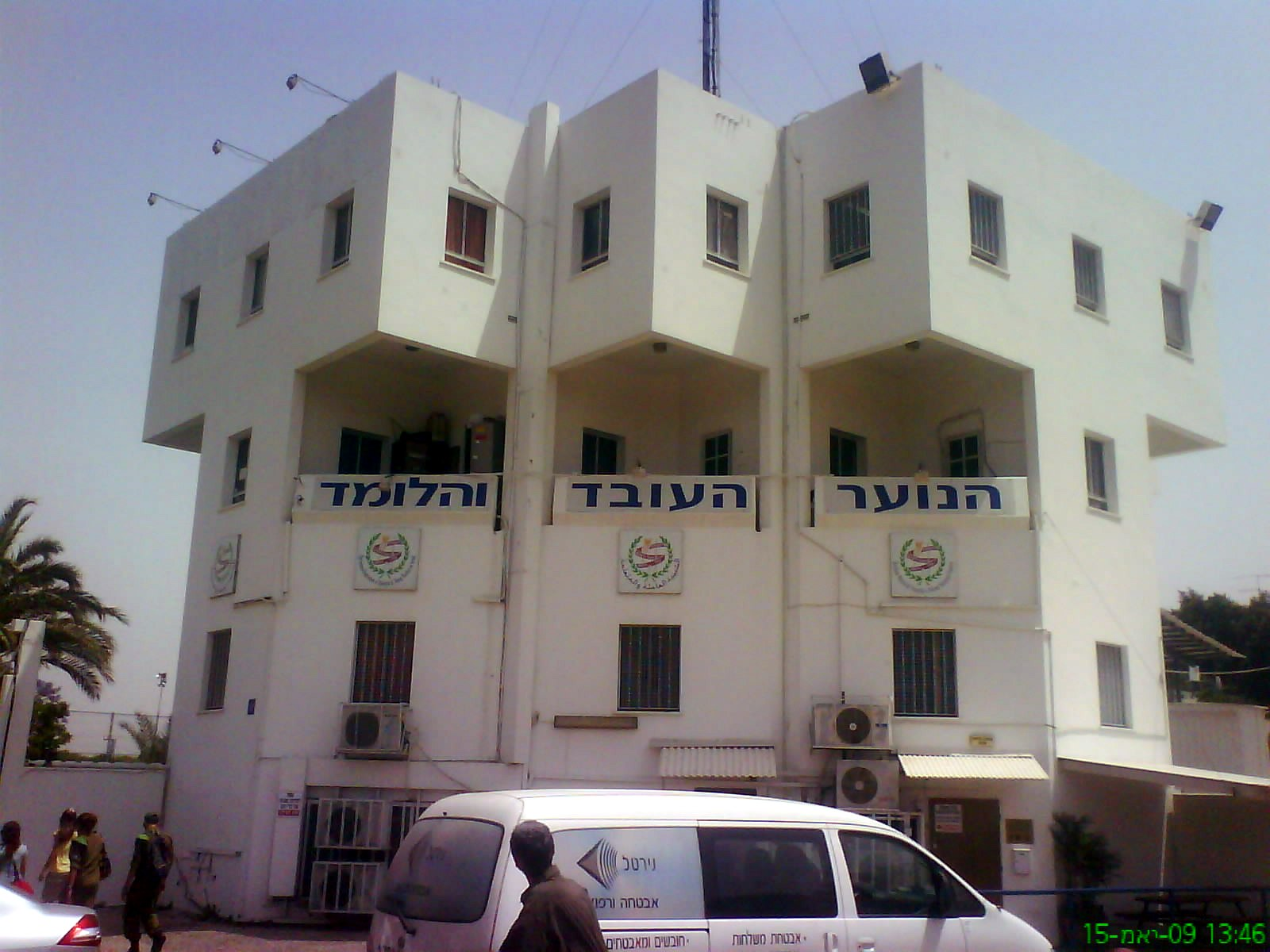
The Dror-Israel center in Tel-Aviv

The organization also provides employment-related legal support for working youth and runs a pre-military academy (mechina) aimed at developing leadership and entrepreneurial skills among participants.

=== HaNoar HaOved VeHaLomed ===
HaNoar HaOved VeHaLomed continues to function as Dror Israel’s youth movement, with around 90,000 members. It organizes activities such as seminars, camps, excursions, and local youth-led initiatives. The movement includes Jewish, Druze, and Palestinian citizens of Israel, making it one of the few major youth organizations in the country with both Arab and Jewish members.

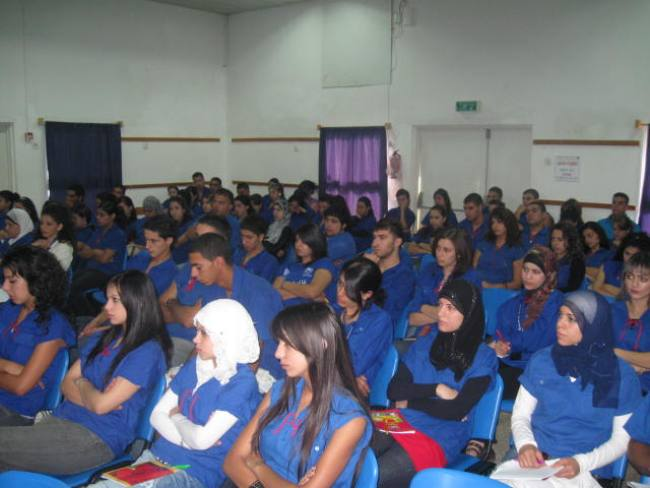
Youth guides from the Arabic sector of HaNoar HaOved VeHaLomed

The movement emphasizes a “youth leading youth” model, in which older participants run activities for younger ones. Alumni of the movement have gone on to become prominent figures in Israeli politics and society, including Yitzhak Rabin and Shimon Peres.

=== Jewish–Arab shared society programs ===
Dror Israel runs educational programs designed to encourage cooperation and dialogue between Jewish and Palestinian citizens of Israel. Activities include joint youth movement programs, leadership and empowerment workshops, Hebrew and Arabic language courses, and educator training on issues such as coexistence and racism.

Some Palestinian citizens of Israel also participate in national service (Sherut Leumi) through Dror Israel projects.
