= Hura =

Town in southern Israel

Hura: חוּרָה; حورة
- Local council
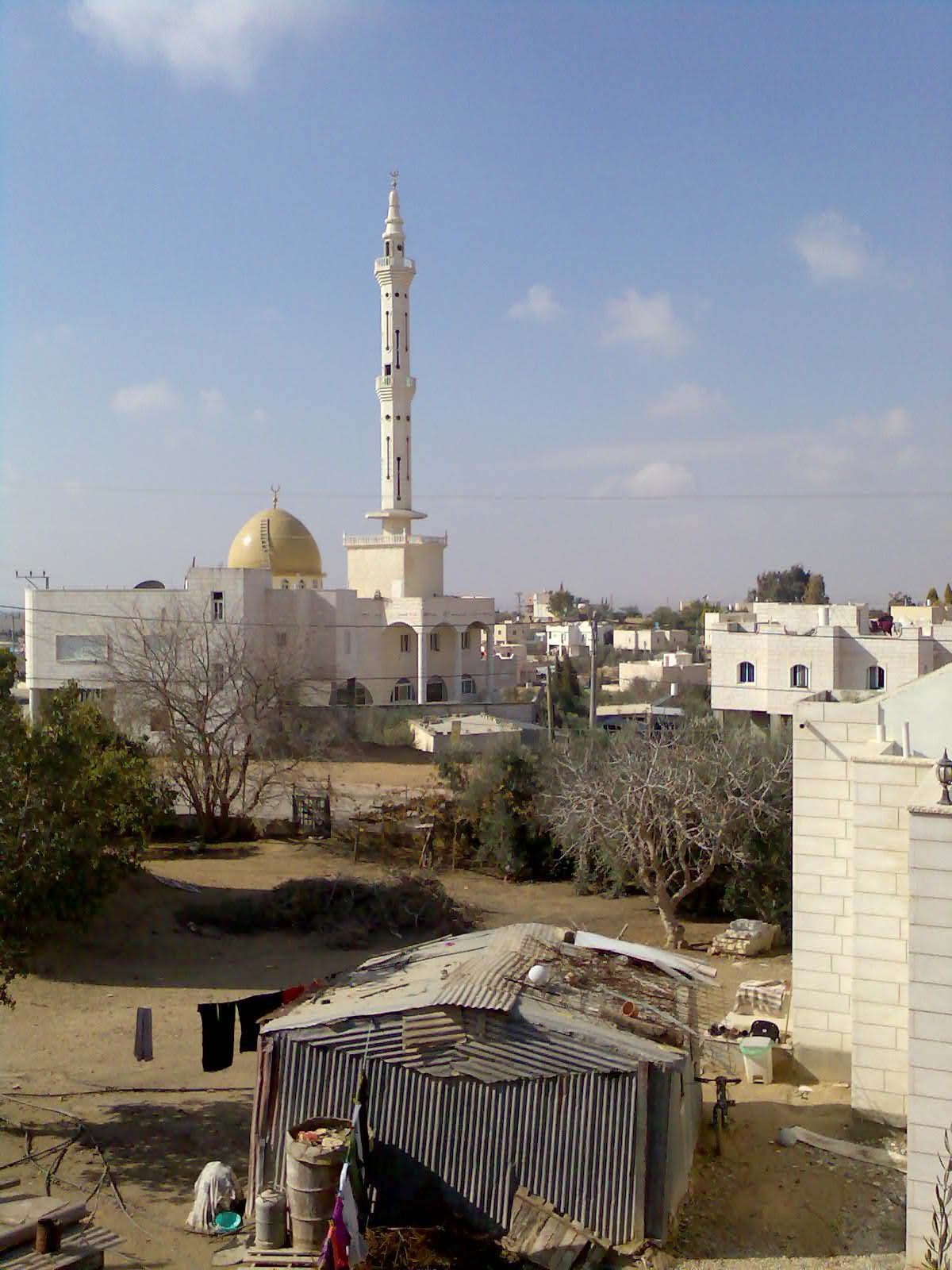

- Location within Northern Negev region of Israel Location within Israel
- Coordinates: 31°17′54″N 34°56′21″E
- Country: Israel
- District: Southern
- Subdistrict: Beersheba
- Natural Region: Be'er Sheva
- Founded: 1989

Government
  - Head of Municipality: Habas Alatuna

Area
  - Total: 6,646 dunams (6.646 km^{2}; 2.566 sq mi)

Population (2024)
  - Total: 23,034
  - Density: 3,466/km^{2} (8,976/sq mi)

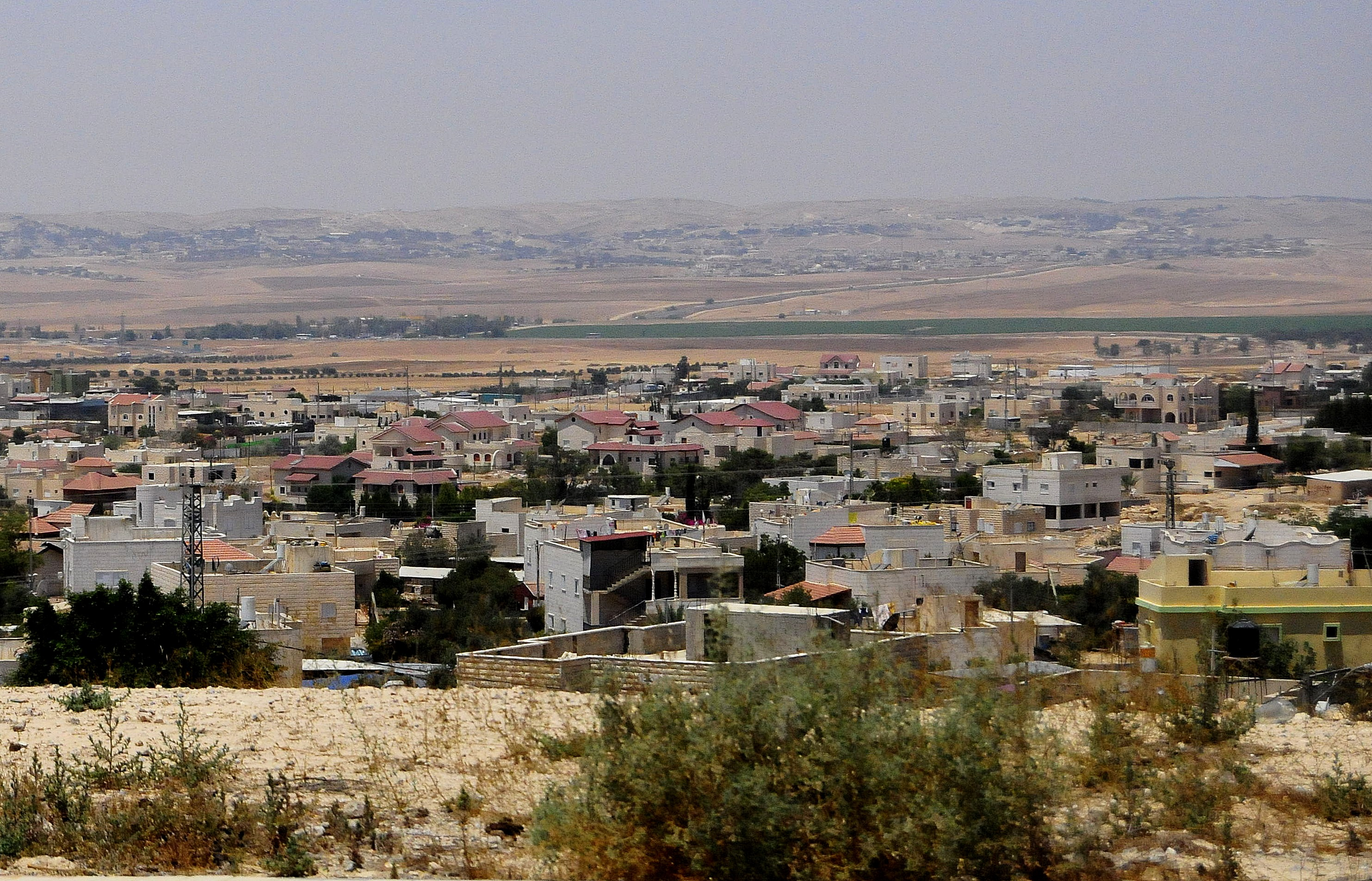
A view of Hura

Hura, or Houra (Hebrew: חוּרָה, Arabic: حورة) is a Bedouin town in the Southern District of Israel. It is located near Beersheba and beside the town Meitar. The town was established in 1989 as a part of solution offered by the state for the consolidation of Negev Bedouin population, and was declared a local council in 1996. In 2024 it had a population of 23,034.

Hura is one of seven Bedouin townships in the Negev desert with approved plans and developed infrastructure (the other six are: Ar'arat an-Naqab (Ar'ara BaNegev), Lakiya, Shaqib al-Salam (Segev Shalom), Kuseife (Kseife), Tel as-Sabi (Tel-Sheva) and the city of Rahat, the largest among them).

== History ==
Prior to the establishment of Israel, the Negev Bedouins were a semi-nomadic society that had been through a process of sedentarization since the Ottoman rule of the region.

During the British Mandate period, the administration did not provide a legal framework to justify and preserve land ownership. In order to settle this issue, Israel’s land policy was adapted to a large extent from the Ottoman land regulations of 1858 as the only preceding legal framework. This enabled Israel to nationalize most of the Negev lands using the state land regulations of 1969.

Israel has continued the policy of sedentarization of Negev Bedouin imposed by the Ottoman authorities, and at first it included regulation and re-location - during the 1950s Israel re-located two-thirds of the Negev Bedouin into an area that was under a martial law.

The next step was to establish seven townships built especially for Bedouin in order to sedentarize and urbanize them by offering them what were stated to be better life conditions, proper infrastructure and high quality public services in sanitation, health and education, and municipal services. This was seen as particularly important since the birth rate of the Bedouin population in Israel is among the highest in the world - it doubles its size every 15 years. Not all Bedouin have agreed to move from tents and structures built on the state lands into permanent apartments prepared for them. Only about 60% of Bedouin citizens of Israel live in permanent planned villages like Hura, while the rest live in what Israel deems illegal homes and settlements spread all over the northern Negev.

== Demography ==
Primarily members of three Bedouin family clans reside in Hura: Abu Alkian, Al-naami and Al-Nabari. According to the Israel Central Bureau of Statistics (CBS), the population of Hura was 17,500 in December 2010, up from 16,600 at the end of 2009. Hura's jurisdiction is 6,646 dunams.

Unlike illegal villages with scarce access to water, electricity, and services, which are repeatedly demolished by Israel, Hura provides the residents with all their basic needs and the State encourages scattered Bedouin tribes to settle in Hura by selling them land plots with ready built homes at a nominal cost.

== Education ==
There are 8 schools in the village (December 2009), among them "Amal", "Atid al-Nur" and others. Members of different families study in separate schools due to conflicts between families. Village members have an opportunity for a post-secondary education at an "Ahad" school that gives preparation for academic studies in the university. Girls living in Hura and studying at local schools show excellent results - a very large number of them pass school graduation exams successfully. Overall, 6.5% percent of Hura's residents have a college degree.

== Health care ==
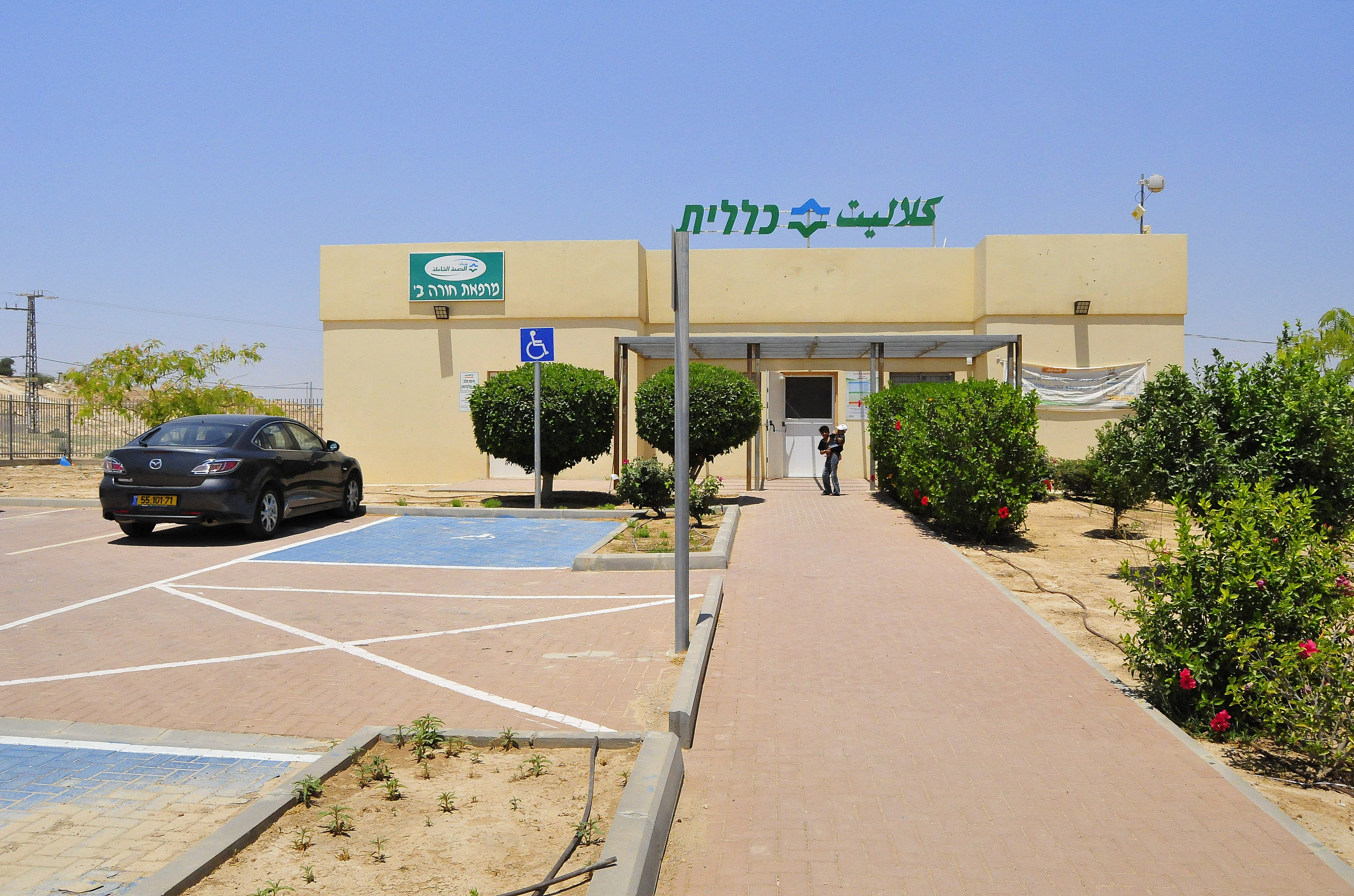
Hura medical clinic

There are branches of several health funds (medical clinics) in Hura: Leumit and Clalit as well as several Tipat Halav perinatal babycare centers.

== Economy ==
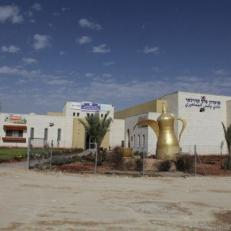
Hura school and community center

There is an operating industrial park in Hura with some 60 industrial plots giving jobs to hundreds of village members. It is supposed to be extended in the coming years.

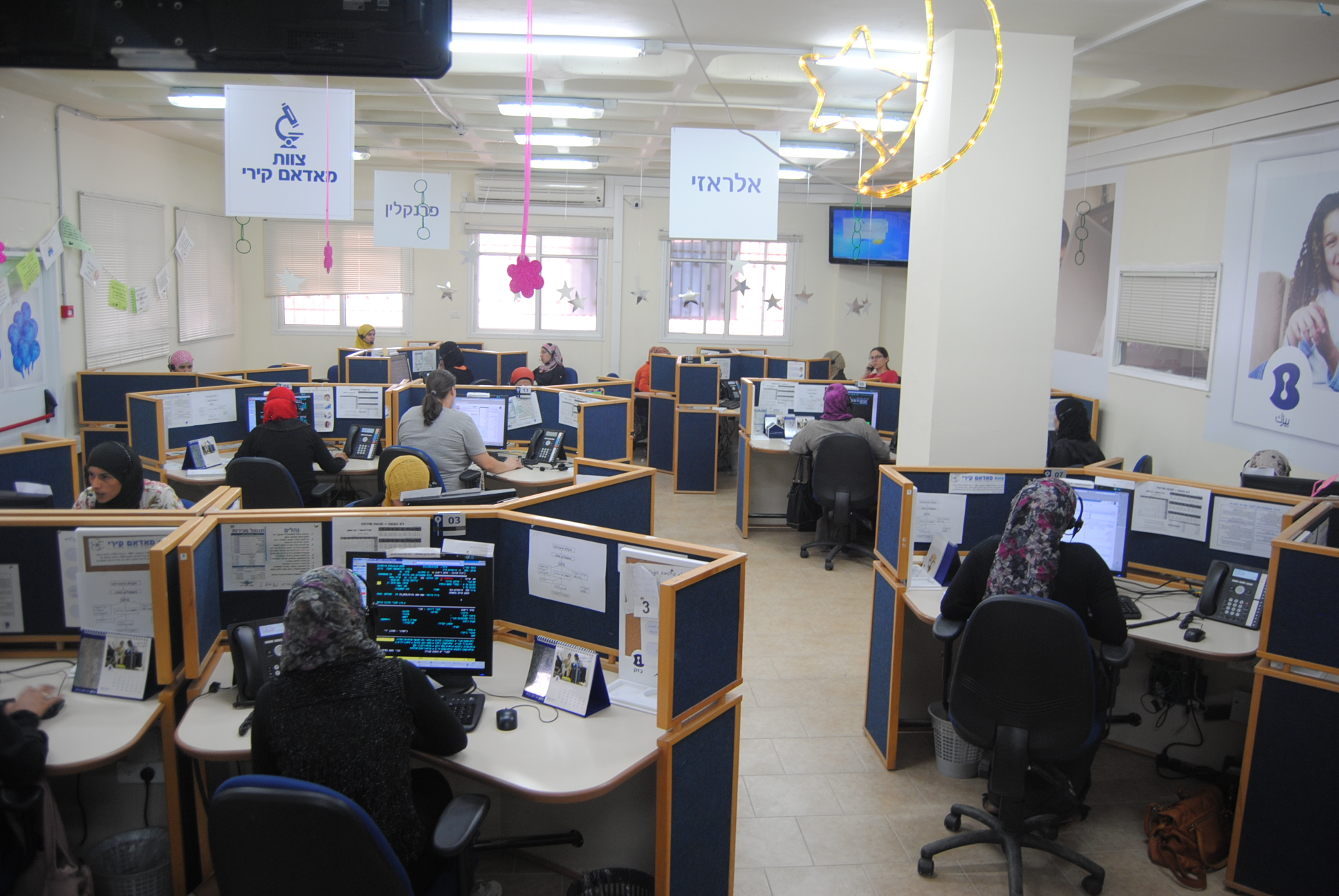
Hura's Bezeq Call Center

This industrial park offers employment and output opportunities to the community members who decide to move to Hura.

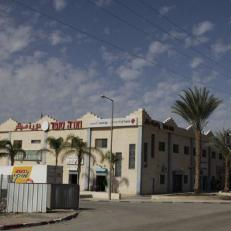
Industrial park in Hura

In March 2012, Bezeq launched a women-only call center which supports its internet service division, in an effort to reduce the unemployment rate of Bedouin women. The initial proposal was made by Ministry of Industry, Trade and Labor and JDC-Israel.

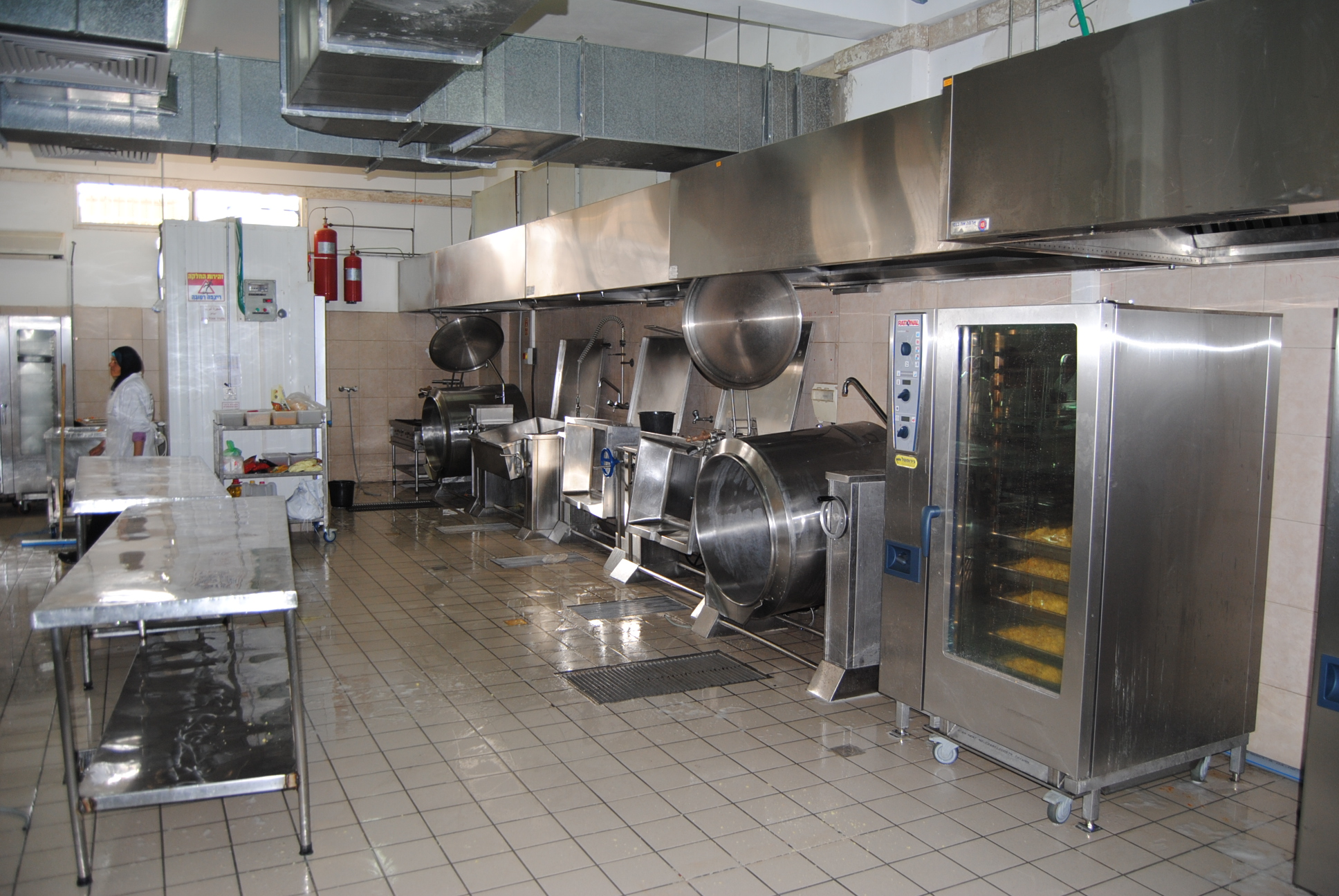
Catering Women In Hura

In March 2012, the Bezeq telecommunications group in cooperation with the Industry, Trade and Labor Ministry launched a new call center inside a Hura mosque as a part of an effort to combat female unemployment in the Negev Bedouin community. It provides assistance to Internet customers. The call center is managed and operated by 50 Bedouin women, mostly from Hura, but is supposed to employ more women in the future.

There are also accelerators in Hura to foster new business ventures in the area.

== Community projects ==
There are several community projects in Hura. Most of them are grass-roots, but supported by the state. Among them - "Women in Hura" (120 local women prepare meals for the schoolchildren) a business that makes an annual revenue of three million dollars, "Green Hura" (NIS 1.5 million shekels invested in planting of greenery and improving the appearance of the village), "Wadi Attir" (a farm for ecological agriculture and tourism), a textile processing, sewing and clothes production course for Bedouin women, and others.

== Local government ==
=== Mayors ===
- Dr. Muhammad Al-Nabari (2005–2018)
- Habas Alatuna (2018–present)

== Voting patterns ==
In the 2022 election, 96 percent of voters in Hura voted for the Arab parties, while 2 percent voted for the parties of the right-wing coalition led by Benjamin Netanyahu and 1 percent voted for the parties of the center-left coalition led by Yair Lapid. Among the voters for the Arab parties, 57 percent voted for Ra'am, while 41 percent voted for the Hadash–Ta'al list and 2 percent voted for Balad.

In the 2026 election, 97 percent of voters in Hura voted for the Arab parties, while 1.4 percent voted for the parties of the center-left coalition led by Gadi Eisenkot and 0.3 percent voted for the parties of the right-wing coalition led by Benjamin Netanyahu. Among the voters for the Arab parties, 68 percent voted for Ra'am, while 32 percent voted for the Joint List. Voter turnout roughly doubled compared with the 2022 election.

== Gallery ==
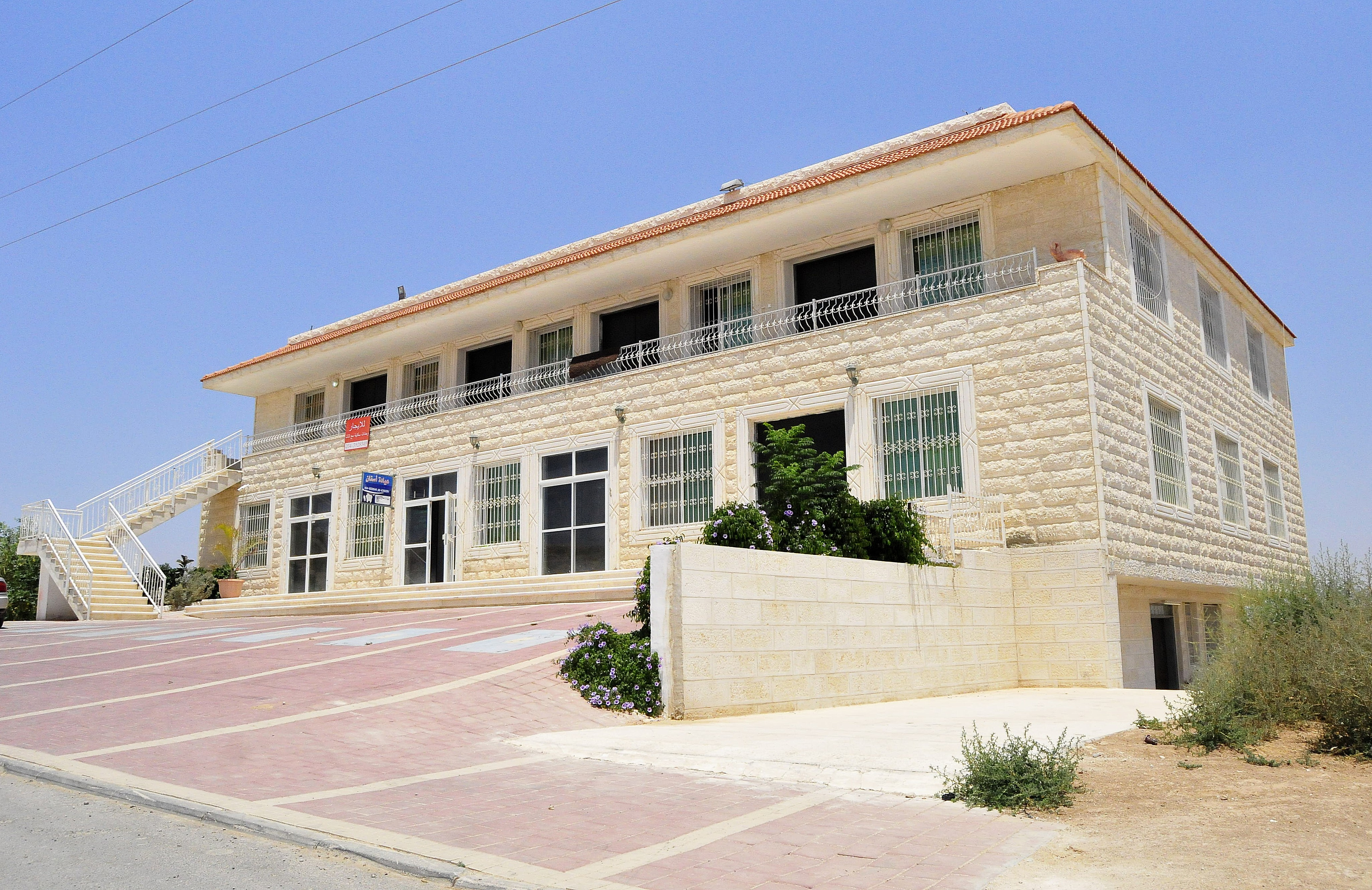
House in Hura, 2012

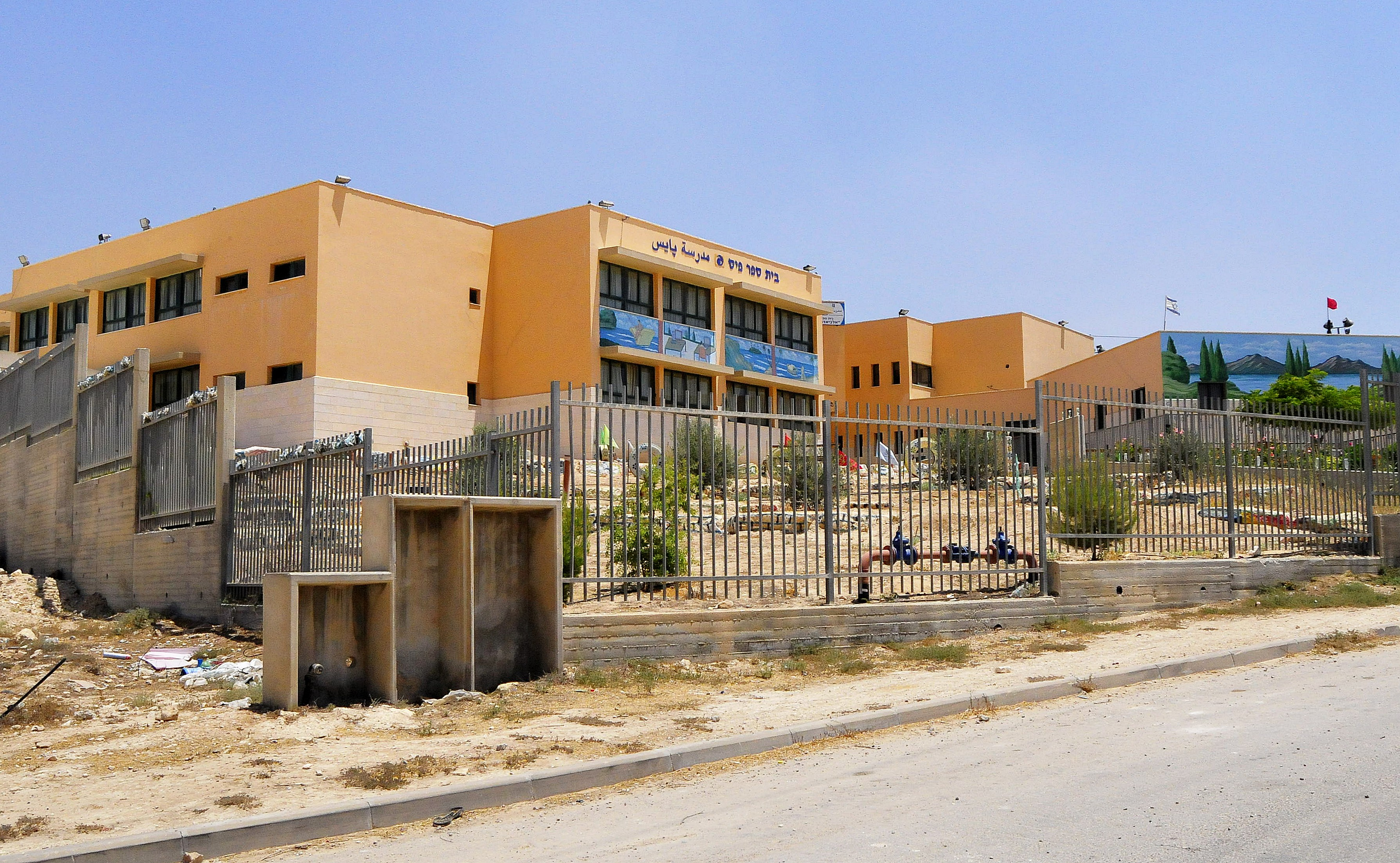
One of Hura's schools, 2012

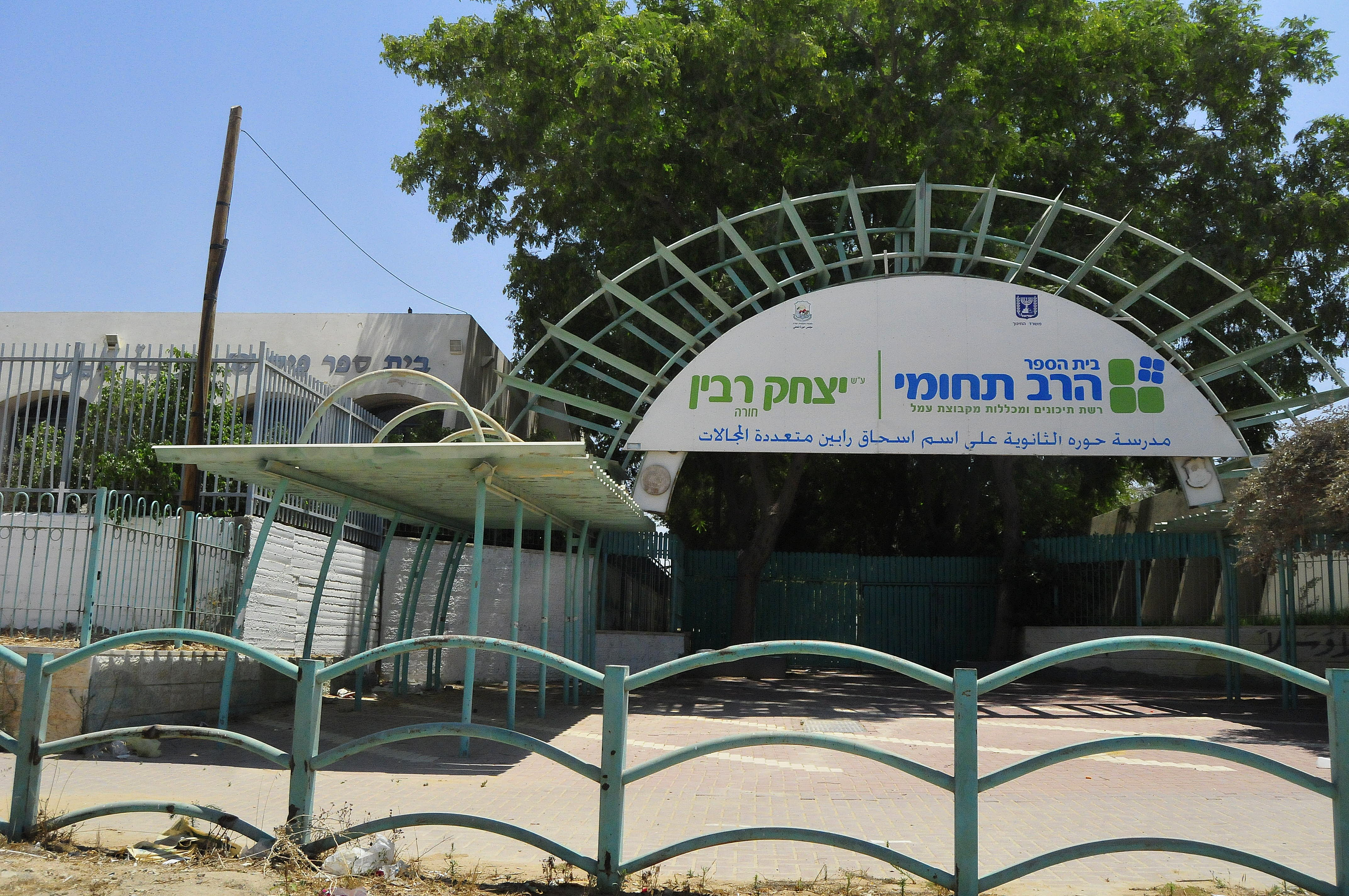
Another school in Hura, 2012

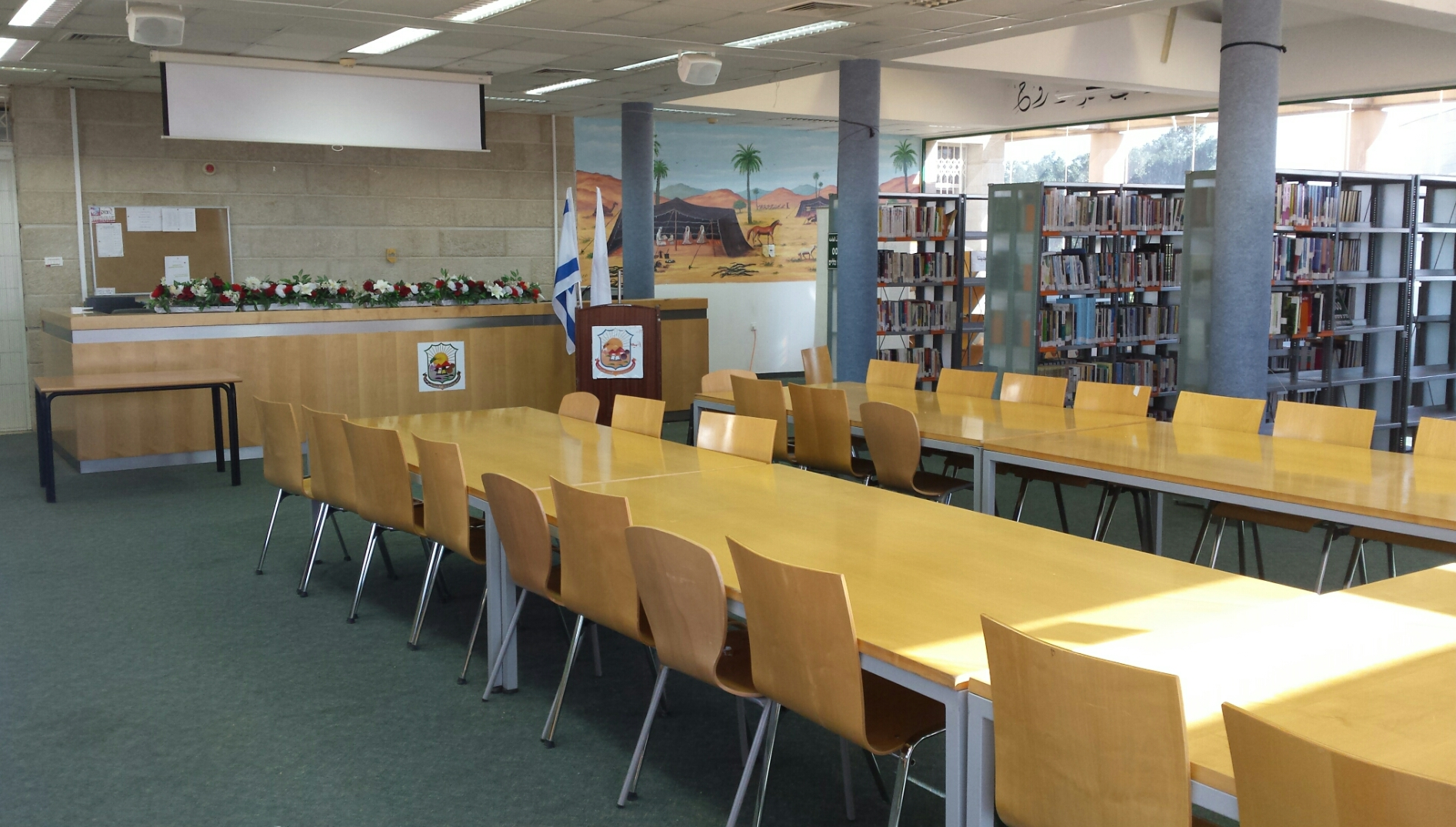
A Library in Hura, 2015

== See also ==
- Arab localities in Israel
- Negev Bedouin
- Negev Bedouin women
