= Ze'ev Drori =

Israeli-American entrepreneur (born 1940)

- זאב דרורי
- Born: 1940 (age 85–86); Tel Aviv, Israel
- Known for: Founder and former CEO of Monolithic Memories; Former CEO and president of Tesla Motors

Ze'ev Drori (Hebrew: זאב דרורי; born 1940) is an Israeli-born American technology entrepreneur currently residing in California. Drori was the founder and Chief Executive of Monolithic Memories, before the company merged with Advanced Micro Devices (AMD) in 1987. He helped engineer the turnaround of struggling electric carmaker Tesla Motors as President and CEO from 2007 to 2008.

== Biography ==
=== Early life ===
Ze'ev Drori was born and raised in Tel Aviv, Israel. His father worked for the Tel Aviv Municipality and his mother was a homemaker. Uninterested in school, he left home at 15 to move to Kibbutz Hulda, where despite his young age Drori worked in the fields.

Drori enlisted in the Israel Defense Forces at 17, and moved through the ranks to become an officer in the Paratroopers Brigade. As an officer at the age of 20, he led his platoon during Israel's many skirmishes with its neighbors.

At the completion of his military service, Drori passed his Israeli matriculation exams (Bagrut) and went to the United States to study. Having gained admission to the Polytechnic University of New York, Drori supported himself by working a variety of jobs, including as a chimney sweep, a dishwasher/busboy, in a slaughterhouse, in a cold-storage house in the meat-packing district of New York and on a lumberyard. Upon receiving his B.S, Drori accepted a position with IBM in Burlington, Vermont. He was soon promoted to head IBM's semiconductor memory operation as the engineering manager. He left IBM after receiving a job offer from Fairchild Semiconductor in Mountain View, one of the pioneering Silicon Valley electronics firms. He left Fairchild to start his own company in 1970.

=== Monolithic Memories ===
In 1970, Drori founded Monolithic Memories, a semiconductor firm that pioneered advances in memory and logic technology. He served as President, CEO, Chairman of the Board and CTO of Monolithic through 1981 and as chairman of the board from 1981 to 1987. As CTO, he was responsible for the invention, development and manufacturing of the PAL (programmable array logic), the PROM (programmable read-only memory), ROM (read-only memory), and high performance signal processing chips. In 1980, Monolithic went public at $21 a share. In 1987, Monolithic merged with Advanced Micro Devices (AMD) in a transaction valued at $437 million.

=== Clifford Electronics ===
During his tenure as Chairman of Monolithic Memories, Drori first invested in and subsequently acquired Clifford Electronics, a fledgling car alarm manufacturer. In 1985, having given up day to day control over operations at Monolithic Memories, Drori became the full-time CEO and president. Drori brought cutting edge innovations to the auto security industry by incorporating the latest "Silicon Valley" technologies. Under his leadership the company established a strong IP position including the development of the remote control car alarms. Clifford was the OEM supplier to several foreign and domestic car makers. Clifford's rapid growth was also fueled by a national and international network of after-market dealers. Drori grew Clifford Electronics into one of the world's leading automobile security companies, before selling the company to Allstate Insurance in 1999.

=== Tesla Motors ===
In 2007, Drori was appointed President and CEO of electric carmaker Tesla Motors (now Tesla Inc.). Drori was specifically tasked with bringing the company's struggling Roadster prototype to market, which he was able to do in 2008. In October 2008, Elon Musk, a major Tesla investor, took over as CEO. Drori was on the board as vice-chairman, but has since left the company.

=== Automobile racing ===
An avid race car driver, Drori has been actively competing in Formula Cars since 1997. He has twice participated in the Long Beach Toyota Grand Prix, and competed in the Formula Car Challenge presented by Goodyear Tire and Rubber Company from 2005 until 2009.
