= Hasya Drori =

Israeli politician

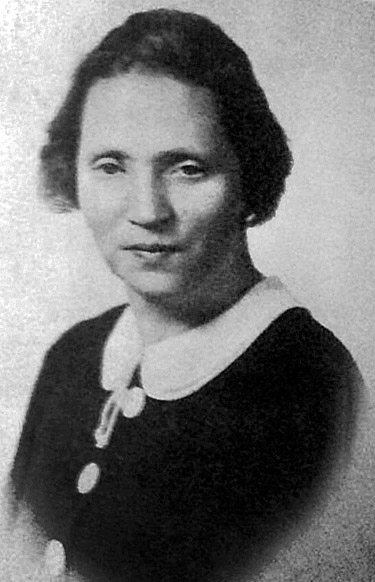

Faction represented in the Knesset
- 1949–1951: Mapai

Personal details
- Born: 1899 Gomel, Russian Empire
- Died: 3 June 1976 (aged 76–77)

Hasya Drori (Hebrew: חסיה דרורי; 1899 – 3 June 1976) was an Israeli politician who served as a member of the Knesset for Mapai between 1949 and 1951.

== Biography ==
Drori was born Hasya Kupfermintz in Gomel in the Mogilev Governorate of the Russian Empire (now in Belarus), and was a member of the Youth of Zion and HeHalutz youth groups. She emigrated to Mandatory Palestine in 1922, and joined Gdud HaAvoda. In 1924 she was amongst the founders of moshav Kfar Yehezkel. She became a member of the Working Mothers Organisation, and also joined Mapai. In 1937 she travelled to the United States as an emissary for Mapai and the Histadrut trade union.

In 1949 she was elected to the first Knesset on the Mapai list and was known as a formidable feminist. However, she lost her seat in elections two years later. She later worked in immigrant absorption.
