= David M. Dror =

- Other name: David Mark Dror
- Organization(s): Micro Insurance Academy, New Delhi
- Awards: Karmaveer Puraskaar

David Mark Dror is a specialist in health insurance. He is managing director and chairman of the Micro Insurance Academy in New Delhi. Dror is a former hon. professor at Erasmus University Rotterdam.

Dror is a past recipient of a Karmaveer Puraskaar award.

== Selected works ==
=== Books ===
- Dror, David M.; Preker, Alexander S. (2002). Social Reinsurance: A New Approach to Sustainable Community Health Financing. Washington, D.C.: World Bank. ISBN 978-0-8213-5041-6.
- Dror, David M. (2018). Financing Micro Health Insurance: Theory, Methods and Evidence. World Scientific. ISBN 978-981-323-847-3.
