= Dror, Israel =

Dror: דרור (Hebrew)
- Location within Northern Negev region of Israel Location within Israel
- Coordinates: 31°19′13″N 34°59′49″E
- Country: Israel
- District: Southern
- Founded: 2010
- Founder: Or Movement

Dror (Hebrew: דרור) is a planned community town currently under construction in the northeastern Negev desert, in southern Israel. The town is located on the slopes of Mount Hiran, along the route between Meitar and Arad. The settlement is being built on the land previously occupied by the unrecognized Bedouin village of Umm al-Hiran.

The settlement was originally named Hiran, a temporary name inspired by the nearby Mount Hiran. In 2022, the town's name was officially changed to "Dror". Or Movement, a movement that promotes Jewish settlements, stands behind the construction and the promotion of the town.

== History ==
The resolution to create the settlement was reached in 1999, leading the Israel Lands Administration and the Ministry of Construction and Housing to initiate planning activities without delay. However, the plan faced opposition from the Ministry of Environmental Protection due to its impact on forest areas and lands designated for a nature reserve.

In 2012, the National Planning and Building Council recommended the establishment of a settlement intended for the Israeli national-religious community. However, this proposal was ultimately not approved by the Government of Israel.

Following the evacuation of the final residents of Umm al-Hiran in 2017 and 2018, the development of the settlement of Hiran began. In January 2019, Interior Minister Aryeh Deri signed an order that annexes the settlement to the Tamar Regional Council, despite the council opposition. In November 2022, construction of the settlement's infrastructure began.

== Controversy ==
The residents of Umm al-Hiran fought against the Israeli authorities' desire to demolish their village from 2004 to 2024.

In August 2017, the Hiran Cooperative Association began the construction and planning of the town of Hiran. The town was planned to be built on the site of the Bedouin village of Umm al-Hiran, which Israeli authorities intended to evacuate together with the village Atir. This decision sparked significant controversy and public outrage.

Adalah, a human rights organization, has disclosed a document from the Israeli Ministry of Industry and Commerce, requiring residents wishing to live in Hiran to be Jews, and "adhere to the Torah and commandments in alignment with the principles of Orthodox Judaism".
