= Negev Bedouin women =

Negev Bedouin Women بدو النقب בדואיות בנגב
Regions with significant populations

Languages
- Arabic (mainly Bedouin dialect, also Egyptian and Palestinian), Hebrew (Modern Israeli)

Religion
- Islam

Negev Bedouin women are women who belong to a desert-dwelling Arab ethnographic group known as the Negev Bedouin, inhabitants of the Negev region of Israel. Bedouin women are said to be doubly marginalized, as members of a minority and as women in a male-dominated society. Marginalization stems from traditional gender norms and expectations in Negev Bedouin society, manifesting itself in employment, educational, and health care outcomes.

== Cultural status ==
Traditionally, the Bedouin society was nomadic, pastoral, and agricultural based. Within this system, labor was divided along gender lines. Women were traditionally in charge of the agricultural activities, which included herding, grazing, fetching water, and raising crops, while men were in charge of guarding their land and receiving visitors. Bedouin culture, especially as it relates to gender norms, developed around this economic structure. In accordance with these traditional economic roles, women in Bedouin society did not interact with strangers, especially unfamiliar men. Bedouin men mediated most of the interactions with the larger society. As such, Bedouin culture became highly patriarchal. Within this traditional system, the men have held most of the power, but women were in charge of the household decision-making.

However, Bedouin culture has been changing, particularly in the Negev. The policy of the Israeli government to move the Negev Bedouin from the desert to official settlements has had several significant effects. The move from a nomadic lifestyle to a sedentary one has displaced Bedouin women from their critical economic role. Moreover, the shift to a sedentary lifestyle means that wage labor has largely replaced agriculture as the main economic source. Traditionally, women in Negev Bedouin society were not allowed to work outside the home. This custom is still in place today. As the Negev Bedouin have shifted away from agriculture, the productive responsibilities have shifted to the men. Meanwhile, the patriarchal system has been maintained. Ultimately, this has resulted in a loss of power for Bedouin women. It is still considered culturally inappropriate for women to interact with strangers and the men of the family still mediate their families' interactions with society. Negev Bedouin women are increasingly excluded from decision-making within the household and important decisions are made by men.

== Employment ==
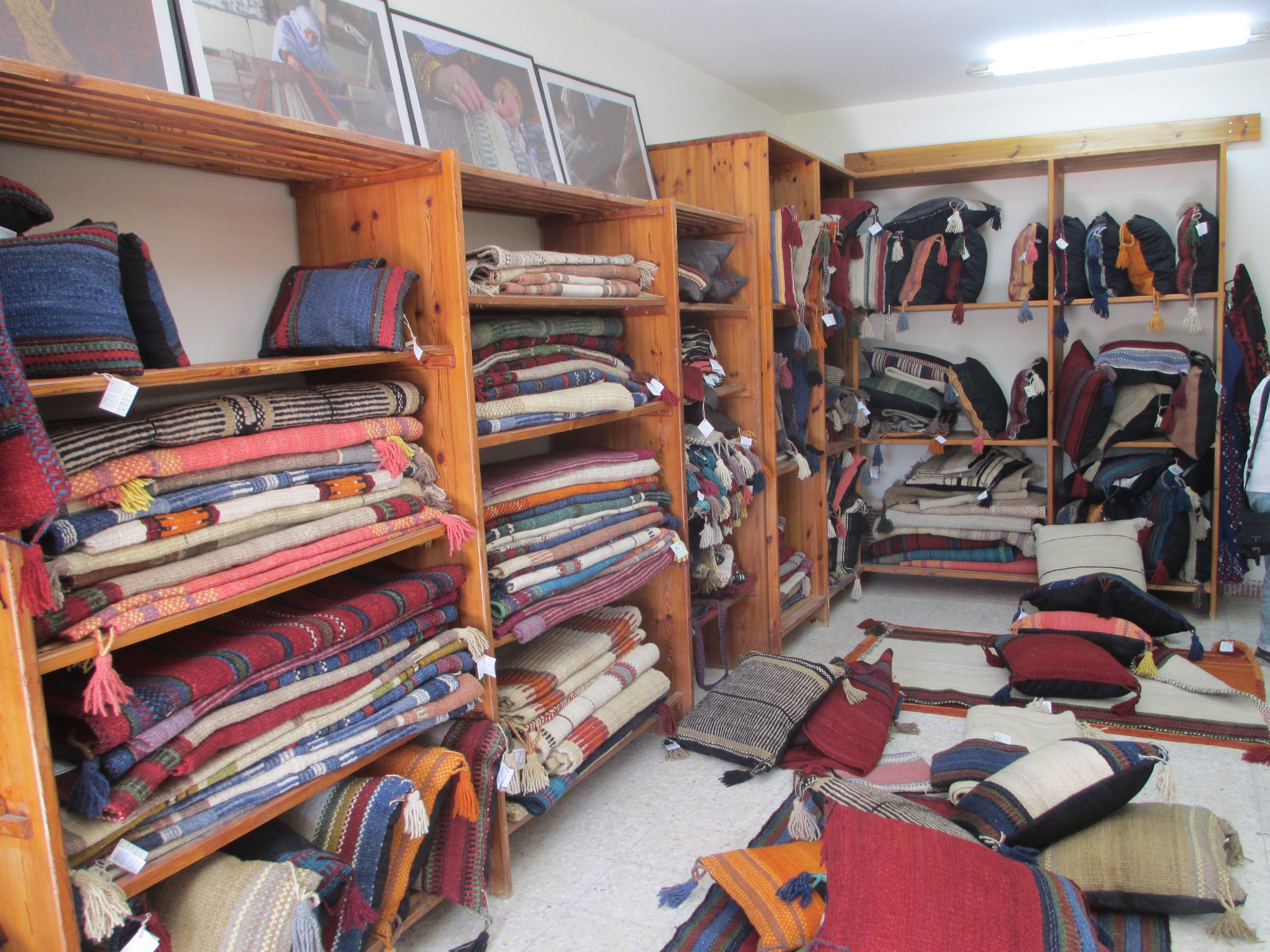
Negev Weaving project by bedouin women in Lakiya to create employment opportunities

Reliable statistics concerning Bedouin women's participation in the labor force are difficult to find. The same gender norms that limit women's employment outside the home also prevents women from registering as unemployed at the unemployment offices. Nevertheless, it has been estimated that in 2007, only 11.4% of Bedouin women were employed outside of their homes. However, this estimate did not distinguish the types of work Negev Bedouin women engaged in outside of the household.

Several factors contribute to Bedouin women's lack of participation in the labor force. A study conducted by economist Aamer Abu-Qarn determined that the most significant barriers to women's employment are lack of education, lack of experience, and poor infrastructure in Bedouin towns. Surprisingly, factors that were not found significant by the model included the presence or number of children, the health of household members, and the level of modernity.

Other factors that explain the relative underrepresentation of Bedouin women in the labor force were discrimination in the labor market, inferior quality of education in Bedouin towns, and a lack of suitable jobs nearby. While all of these factors could also apply to explaining the lack of Bedouin men in the labor force, they are especially acute for women. Discrimination in the labor market affects Bedouin men as well as women. However, Bedouin women must also contend with the cultural expectation that women should not work outside of the home. While a lack of education is problematic for employment in general (male as well as female), education is a bigger obstacle to entry into the labor market for women than it is for men. Bedouin girls are much more likely to drop out of school than their male peers, and women are less likely to seek higher education. Finally, Bedouin women are often not permitted to travel alone. Therefore, travelling long distances to work is not an option. This effectively limits women's employment possibilities to those in the immediate geographic vicinity. When women are employed, they generally earn much less than men.

Statistics describing the types of employment Negev Bedouin women engage in are virtually non-existent. In many instances, such data are simply not reported in employment surveys. Even the most encompassing studies often fail to fully account for women's employment, especially the disaggregated types of employment.

== Education ==
=== Primary and secondary education ===
In general, Negev Bedouins have one of the highest school dropout rates in Israel. Between grades one and twelve, 85% of girls and 71% of boys drop out. As with many other areas, poor infrastructure (especially pronounced in the unrecognized villages, but also in the official towns) is a significant obstacle. The physical conditions of school buildings are often substandard, with many lacking in basic facilities, such as libraries, gyms, cafeterias, and heating and cooling systems. Under Israeli law, education is compulsory for all students between the ages of six and thirteen. However, indifference at the government level has meant that this law has not always been enforced with regards to the Negev Bedouin. Moreover, the government will not support infrastructure developments to schools in the unrecognized villages, as the official policy is to incentivize the relocation of the Bedouin into towns. As the building and maintenance of schools is a municipal matter, there are relatively fewer Bedouin schools (compared to the rest of Israeli society), and schools are often further away from most households.

Bedouin girls face additional obstacles to their education. Among the biggest problems is the nature of the schools. Most Bedouin schools are co-ed, meaning that boys and girls study together. For many families (especially the more traditional ones), this is unacceptable, particularly because of the presence of boys from other tribes. The drop out rate for Bedouin girls is much higher than that of Bedouin boys (85% vs. 71%, respectively). The fact that boys and girls study together is arguably a driving force behind this incredibly high rate. A study conducted by Abu-Rabia-Queder found that the most important factor in whether girls remained in schools was the decision of her father. In other words, if the girl's father did not agree with her education, there was little chance of her remaining in school. Generally, men who were themselves educated and/or employed were much more likely to support their daughters' educations. However, of the fathers surveyed by the study, none approved of coeducation. Those who disapproved most strongly were more likely to pull their daughters out of school, even if they recognized the benefits education could bring for their daughters.

Another important issue for the education of Negev Bedouin girls is the relative dearth of female teachers. Especially in the post-primary schools, male teachers significantly outnumber female teachers. Of the female teachers, very few are themselves Negev Bedouin. This lack of female teachers means that female students are unable to form relationships with their teachers (as these teachers are male, such a level of interaction would be considered culturally taboo). This shortage of female teachers severely limits girls’ scholastic opportunities, as well as deprives them of potential role models.

=== Higher education ===
The high dropout rate is among the biggest obstacles to higher education for both Bedouin men and women. Of the students that do remain in school, only about 30% pass their matriculation exams. These exams are taken at the end of high school (typically around age 17) and are required for enrollment at Israeli universities. Moreover, Bedouin students studying at Israeli universities face a significant language barrier (instruction is generally in Hebrew or English, not Arabic). Finally, most Negev Bedouin men are employed as wage laborers, not as white-collar or blue-collar workers. In the face of this fact, it often does not seem a reasonable investment to attain higher education.

Among the biggest obstacle to higher education for women is the physical and cultural distance of the universities from Negev Bedouin towns. Even the nearest universities require significant travel time to and from campus. In many instances, Bedouin women are only permitted to make the trip if accompanied by a male relative. Moreover, the university is a very different cultural space than Negev Bedouin towns. Jewish-Israeli culture is largely modern and secular, as opposed to the traditional, religious culture in Negev Bedouin society. This pronounced cultural difference is both an obstacle to enrolling at universities and a challenge women must overcome once they arrive. Additionally, societal pressure to marry young can conflict with attaining a university education. While there have been cases where women could attain a university education after marrying, the familial responsibilities (childcare and housework, for instance) provide additional challenges to completing their studies. Further, studying after marriage is entirely dependent upon the approval of the women's husbands. In other words, women are always dependent upon male consent for their studies, either from their fathers (or other male guardians) or their husbands. Finally, the lack of female employment opportunities means that studying at a university does not seem to be a reasonable investment, especially in instances where family resources are limited.

== Access to healthcare ==
Bedouin women face many of the same problems in terms of accessing health care as do Bedouin men in the Negev. To begin with, infrastructure in Bedouin towns is often underdeveloped or non-existent. In addition to restricting access to health care, this has the potential to create its own health problems, especially in the unrecognized villages. For example, in many unrecognized townships, the absence of a waste disposal system means that trash is deposited into a large, open-air pit. This can cause a myriad of health problems stemming from improper sanitation. Moreover, Bedouins often face both a cultural and a language barrier when seeking medical attention. A relative dearth of Arabic-speaking doctors (and even fewer Arabic-speaking specialists) means that medical attention is often given in Hebrew. Not all Negev Bedouin speak Hebrew, and those that do speak it as a second language. This is especially problematic for those requiring more specialized or intensive care, which often requires strict adherence to certain guidelines. When those guidelines are not fully understood, further health complications can arise. Finally, there are simply not enough doctors to fully serve the needs of the Bedouin population. In the seven recognized Bedouin towns in the Negev, there are a total of seven private pharmacies and 27 family health clinics operated by the Ministry of Health. In 2009, the total population of these towns was near 120,000.

In addition to these problems, Bedouin women have additional obstacles to accessing care. Bedouin women are often not permitted to travel alone. In circumstances where the clinic is further away from the settlement, a male relative must accompany the woman (often forfeiting a day's wage in order to do so). Moreover, higher school dropout rates and lower employment levels among Bedouin women mean that they are less likely to speak Hebrew. If the medical practitioner does not speak Arabic, the women must often rely on their male relatives for translation, thus forfeiting any right to medical privacy. When surveyed, Bedouin women cited lack of childcare (in addition to prohibitive distances and poor infrastructure) as a top barrier to accessing health care.

== See also ==
- Women in Islam
- Women in Asia
- Women's rights
