= 2020 in Israel =

- Decades: 2000s; 2010s; 2020s
- See also: History of Israel; Timeline of Israeli history; List of years in Israel

Events in the year 2020 in Israel.

== Incumbents ==
- President of Israel – Reuven Rivlin
- Prime Minister of Israel – Benjamin Netanyahu
- President of the Supreme Court – Esther Hayut
- Chief of General Staff – Aviv Kochavi
- Government of Israel – Thirty-fourth government of Israel and Thirty-fifth government of Israel

== Events ==
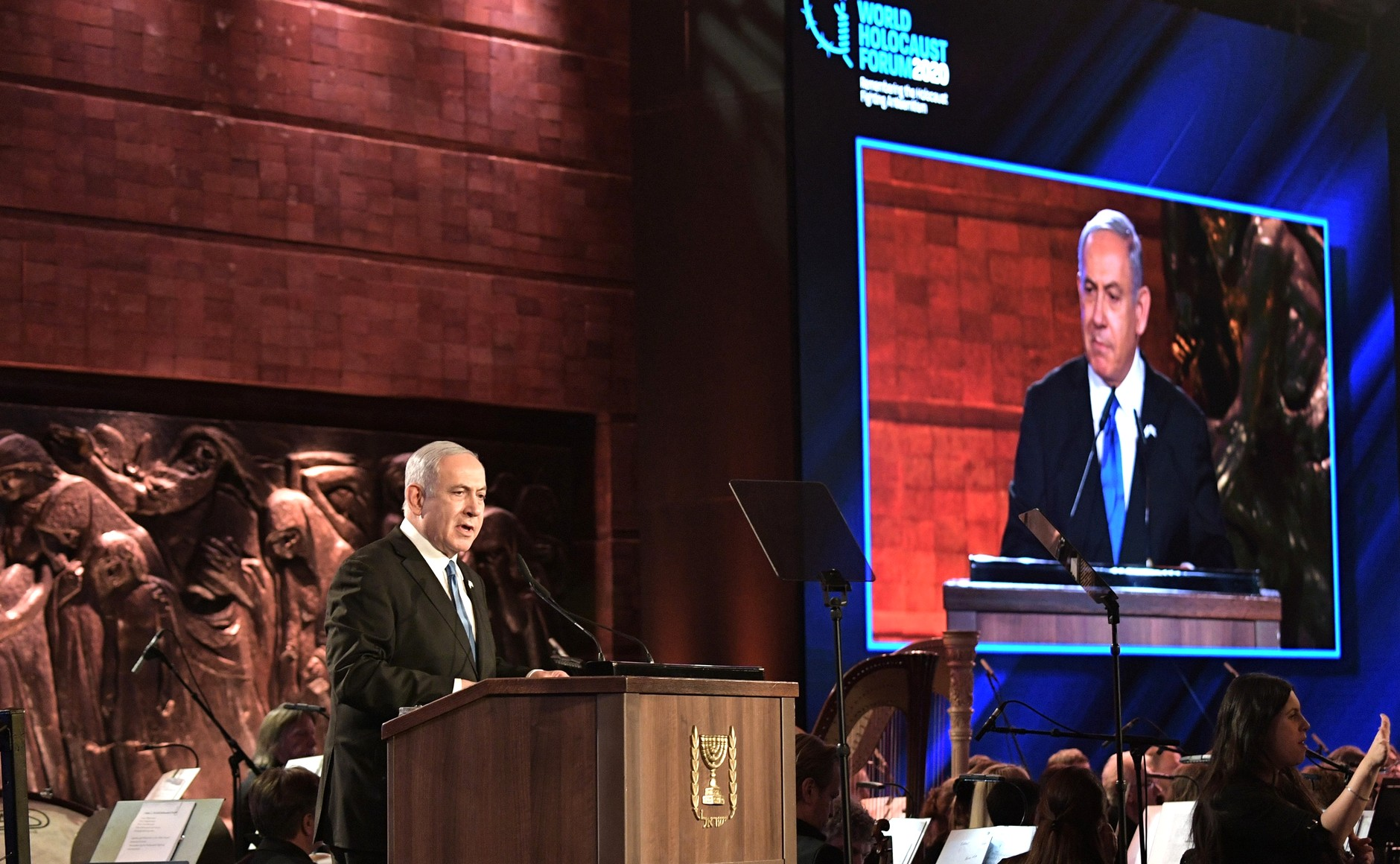
23 January: Prime Minister Benjamin Netanyahu addresses the Fifth World Holocaust Forum in Jerusalem.

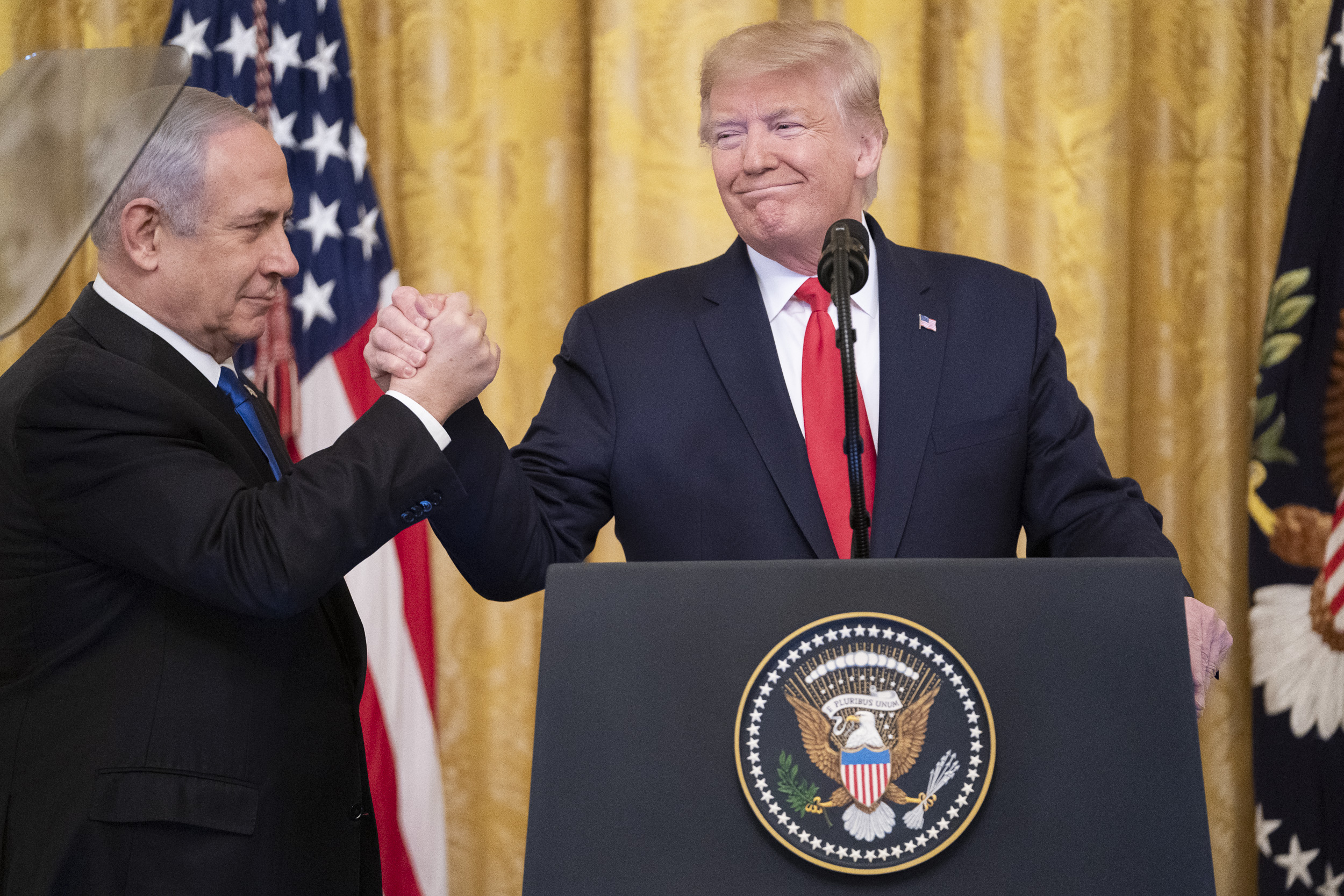
28 January: US President Donald Trump unveils his Middle East peace plan with Prime Minister Benjamin Netanyahu at the White House.

=== January ===
- 1 January
  - Prime Minister Netanyahu requests parliamentary immunity from the corruption charges against him.
  - Jordan receives its first shipment of natural gas from Israel.
- 5 January – Greece and Israel sign an agreement to build the longest underwater gas pipeline in the world.
- 6 January – The Leviathan gas field begins full operations.
- 7 January – Israeli firm Armis is bought for over US$1 billion by Insight Partners.
- 23 January – The Fifth World Holocaust Forum is held in Jerusalem; President Reuven Rivlin is among world leaders who deliver a speech at this occasion.
- 27 January
  - The 75th anniversary of the liberation of the Auschwitz concentration camp is commemorated around the world; Israeli president Reuven Rivlin attends the ceremony at the site of Auschwitz, along with the president of Poland and both leaders condemn the current resurgence of antisemitism.
  - President Rivlin meets with President Andrzej Duda of Poland, and discusses the role of individual Poles in the Holocaust.

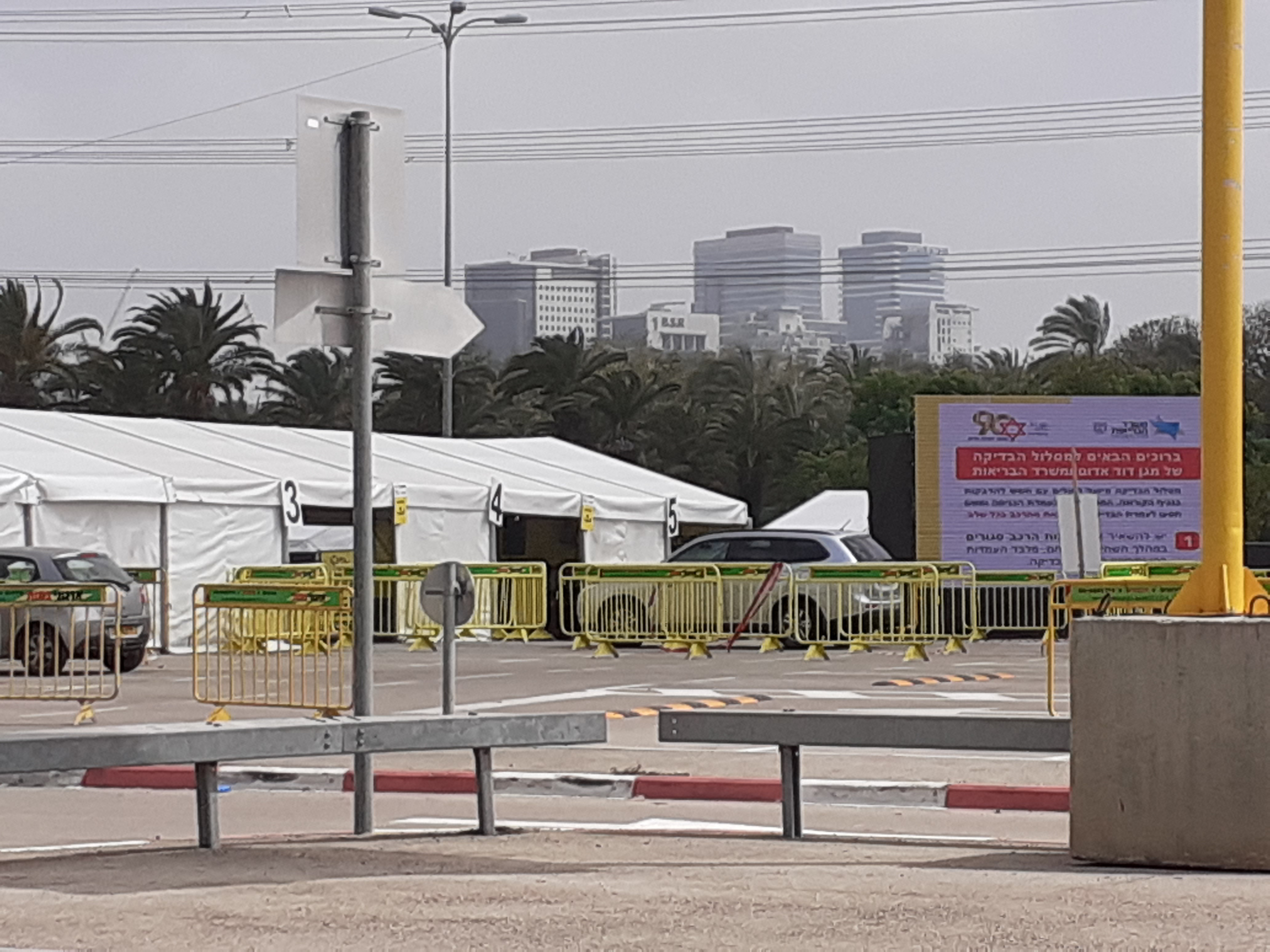
March: Drive-through COVID-19 testing is set up (Tel Aviv site shown).

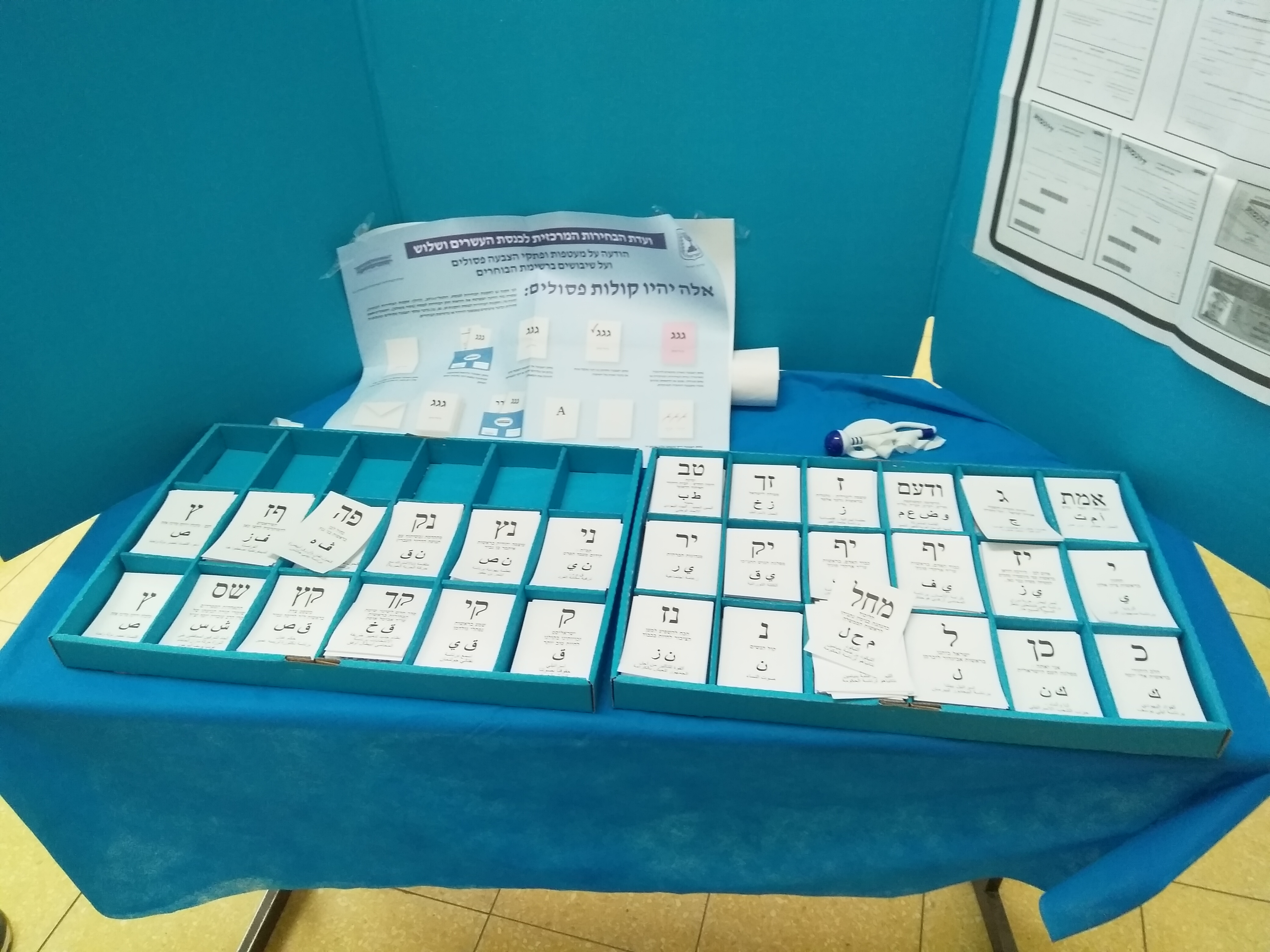
2 March: Twenty-nine parties compete in the 2020 Israeli legislative election (party ballots shown).

- 28 January
  - At the White House, US President Donald Trump unveils his Israeli–Palestinian peace plan, alongside Israeli Prime Minister Benjamin Netanyahu.
  - President Rivlin visits Germany and meets with schoolchildren and German officials, including Defense Minister Annegret Kramp-Karrenbauer.
- 29 January – The Naama Issachar affair ends with a pardon from Russian President Vladimir Putin and her release from a Russian prison.

=== February ===
- 1 February – The Palestinian National Authority cuts all ties with the United States and Israel, including those relating to security, after rejecting a peace plan presented by U.S. President Donald Trump.
- 2 February – Islamist militants bomb a gas pipeline between Egypt and Israel in the northern Sinai Peninsula.
- 3 February – Ugandan President Yoweri Museveni says he is "studying" the possibility of opening an embassy in Jerusalem as Israeli Prime Minister Benjamin Netanyahu promises to open an embassy in Uganda if such a move takes place.
- 6 February – Two Palestinians are killed and seven others are wounded by Israeli soldiers in the occupied West Bank. In a separate incident, twelve Israeli soldiers are injured in a car-ramming attack by a Palestinian resident of East Jerusalem in Jerusalem who then fled to and abandoned the vehicle in Beit Jala, a Bethlehem suburb. The driver was then arrested at the Gush Etzion Junction, south of Bethlehem, and handed over to the Shin Bet security service for questioning. An Israeli police officer was shot injured in a gunman attack at the Lion's Gate in Jerusalem's Old City and then shot dead. Israeli airstrikes were launched at the Gaza Strip.
  - 12 militants killed in Israeli missile strikes near Damascus, Syria.
- 9 February – Israel blocks all Palestinian agricultural exports from the West Bank following Palestinian limitations on imports of Israeli cattle.
- 10 February – A court in Israel sentences Sheikh Raed Salah to 28 months in prison for "inciting to terror".
- 11 February – Israel announces it will install a new water system for use in maximum-security prisons, after discovering that some prisoners are wasting water on purpose.
- 12 February – The United Nations Office of the High Commissioner for Human Rights (OHCHR) publishes a database of 112 business entities involved in Jewish settlements in the West Bank.
- 13 February – The Israeli Air Force launches an air raid on Iranian targets in Damascus, Syria with the Syrian Air Defense Force claiming the interception of several missiles.
- 21 February – The first case of the COVID-19 pandemic in Israel is confirmed when a female citizen tests positive for COVID-19 after returning from quarantine on the Diamond Princess cruise ship.
- 23 February – Six people with two IJMP militants killed in an Israeli airstrike Damascus, Syria.
- 24 February – Israeli Prime Minister Benjamin Netanyahu threatens the Gaza Strip leadership with full-blown airstrikes if the rocket attacks continue.

=== March ===
- 2 March – The 2020 Israeli legislative election takes place; incumbent Prime Minister Benjamin Netanyahu's bloc of right-wing and religious parties again win 58 seats, three short of the majority in the next Knesset required to form a government.
- 4 March – Syrian state media claims that the "hostile objects" that the Syrian Air Defense Force engaged over central Homs Governorate and southern Quneitra Governorate was Israel behind the attacks.
- 9 March – In order to combat the spread of coronavirus, Israel orders all arrivals from abroad, regardless of country, to self-quarantine.
- 12 March –
  - The Israel Institute for Biological Research announces it is making breakthroughs on a vaccine.
  - A 66-year-old Greek man who made a pilgrimage to Israel dies of COVID-19.
- 15 March – The Jerusalem Islamic Waqf announces the closure of the Al-Aqsa Mosque and Dome of the Rock to upend contamination of the holy sites from COVID-19.
- 16 March – Israel's Health Ministry approves experimental treatment for COVID-19.
- 20 March – An 88-year-old Holocaust survivor in Jerusalem is the country's first fatality of the COVID-19 pandemic in Israel.
- 22 March – Eden Alene is chosen to represent Israel in the 2021 Eurovision Song Contest.
- 30 March – Prime Minister Benjamin Netanyahu and some of his cabinet members self-quarantine after an aide tests positive for COVID-19.

=== April ===
- 1 April – Israeli Health Minister Yaakov Litzman tests positive for COVID-19 and goes into quarantine, with the total number of cases in Israel rising to 6,092.
- 8 April – The first nationwide lockdown to combat the COVID-19 pandemic in Israel begins on the first night of Passover.
- 12 April – Former Chief Rabbi of Israel Eliyahu Bakshi-Doron dies from COVID-19 at Shaare Zedek Medical Center in Jerusalem.
- 19 April – Over 2,000 Israelis protest Prime Minister Benjamin Netanyahu, accusing him of endangering democracy in the country and using the coronavirus crisis to escape prosecution on corruption charges.

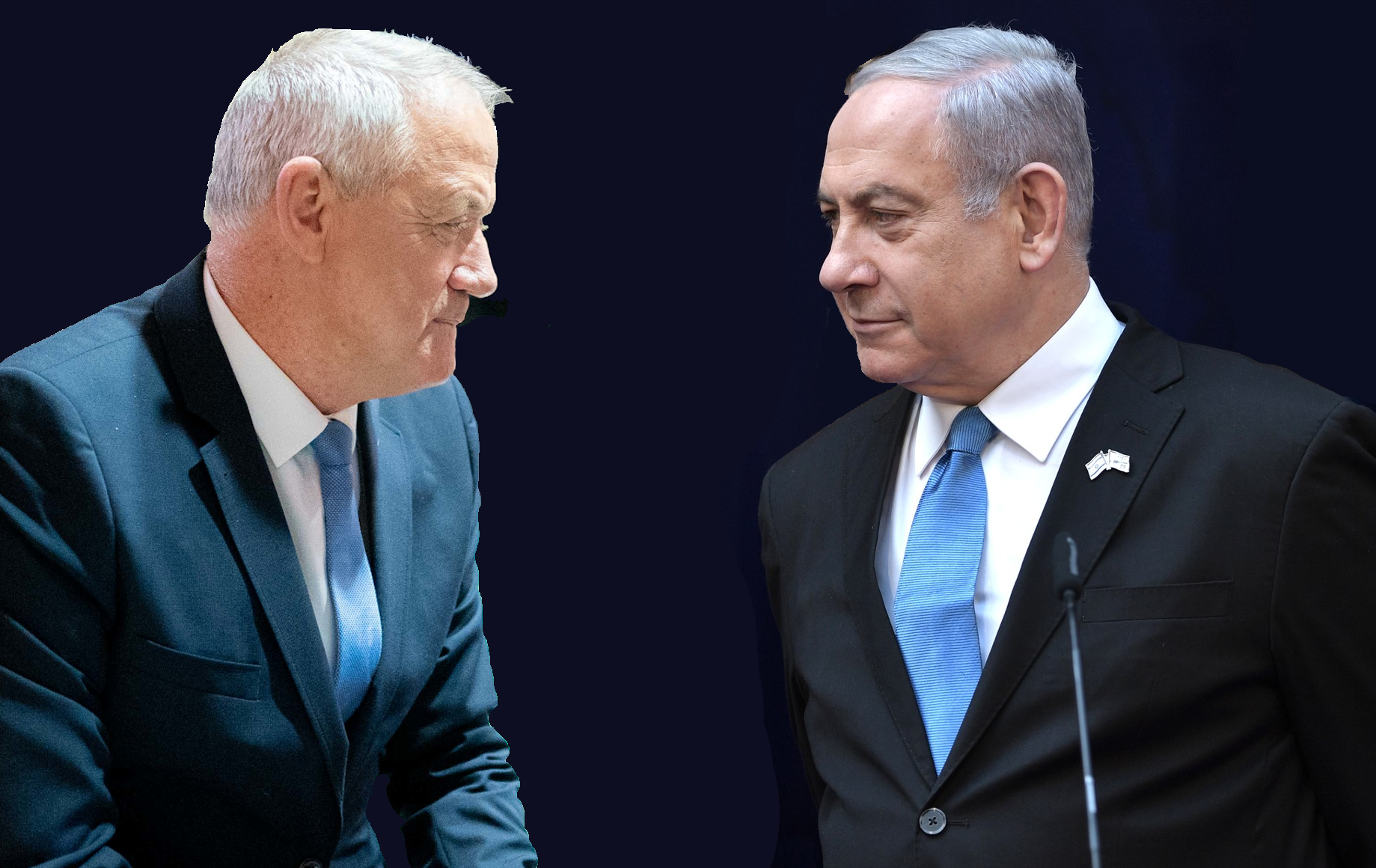
20 April: Benny Gantz and Benjamin Netanyahu announce the formation of a coalition government, which collapses by December.

- 20 April –
  - The leaders of the two largest parties in the Knesset, Benny Gantz (Blue and White) and Benjamin Netanyahu (Likud), announce that they have reached a coalition agreement to form the next government of Israel, with an alternating premiership arrangement between the two men.
  - Israel commemorates Holocaust Remembrance Day ceremony without public gatherings.

=== May ===
- 12 May – An IDF soldier dies after being struck on the head by a thrown stone in Ya'bad, West Bank with the suspect at large. In a separate incident, Israeli police injure a Palestinian man in Kalandia for an attempting stabbing attack.
- 13 May – Israeli troops kill a 15-year-old Palestinian boy and wound four others at the Al-Fawar refugee camp near Hebron, where they are looking for the rock thrower who killed a soldier yesterday.
- 16 May – Jordanian King Abdullah II warns Israel of a "massive conflict" if it annexes parts of the West Bank.
- 17 May –
  - The 35th government of Israel is sworn in.
  - Chinese ambassador to Israel Du Wei is found dead in his home in Tel Aviv, aged 57.
- 19 May – Palestinian President Mahmoud Abbas announces the termination of all agreements, including security ones, with Israel and the United States in response to Israel's plans to annex the Jordan Valley.
- 30 May – Unarmed autistic Palestinian man, Iyad Halaq, 32 is killed by Israeli police officers in Jerusalem.

=== June ===
- 12 June – Israeli Prime Minister Benjamin Netanyahu expresses his condolences for the shooting death of Iyad Halaq and says he "expects a full investigation into the matter" from Interior Security Minister Amir Ohana.
- 19 June – Iran condemns IAEA resolution of calling for the opening of two of its nuclear sites to international inspectors, claiming the country is in full compliance with inspections as part of 2015 nuclear deal and that it is "based on false allegations" from Israel.
- 22 June – Thousands of Palestinians and dozens of foreign diplomats attend a rally in Jericho to oppose Israel's plan to unilaterally annex the Jordan Valley and the settlements in the occupied West Bank.

=== July ===
- 3 July – Michael Ben Zikri drowns after rescuing a Bedouin Arab family from a sinkhole near a manmade lake south of Ashkelon; Israeli Bedouin and Arabs as well as people in Egypt, Iraq, Morocco, Oman and Syria are among those who praise his heroic self-sacrifice.
- 6 July – Israel Aerospace Industries successfully launches the Ofeq-16 reconnaissance satellite via a Shavit rocket. The Israeli Defense Ministry describes the satellite as an "optoelectronic reconnaissance satellite with advanced capabilities".
- 13 July – Hapoel Be'er Sheva defeats Maccabi Petah Tikva 2–0 to win the 2019–20 Israel State Cup in association football at Bloomfield Stadium in Tel Aviv.
- 18 July – Thousands of Israelis protest in front of the Prime Ministers residence demanding the resignation of Prime Minister Benjamin Netanyahu, over his indictment on corruption charges as well as mismanagement of the COVID-19 pandemic and economic crisis that results in severe clashes with police using water cannons and 34 arrested.
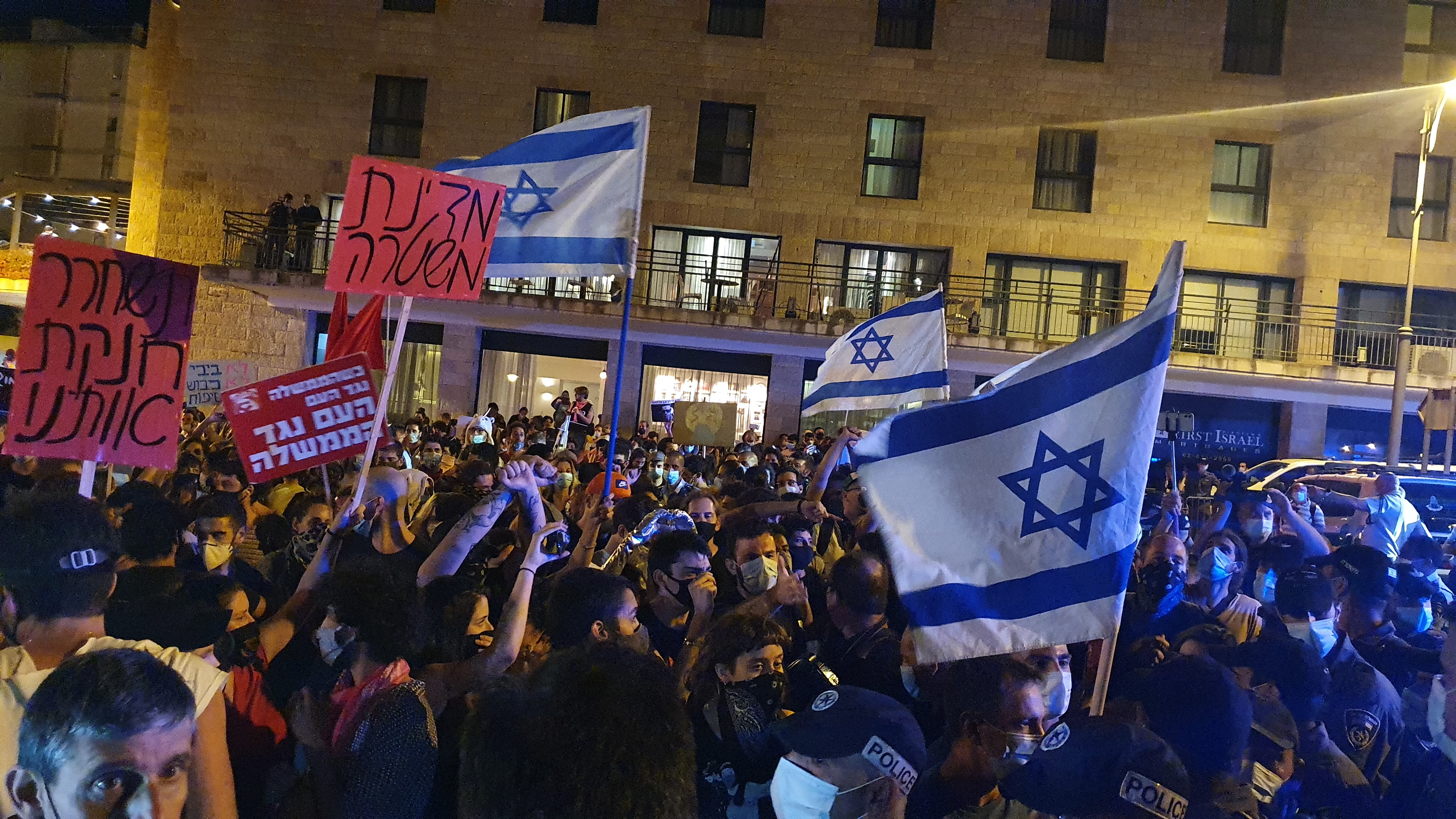
  July: Israelis protest in Jerusalem against Prime Minister Benjamin Netanyahu.
- 19 July – The Israeli government approves the subsea EastMed pipeline which will supply Europe with natural gas. The construction of the pipeline is expected to be completed by 2025, and will provide an estimated 10 billion cubic meters of gas per year.
- 20 July –
  - Syrian air defenses intercept an unconfirmed Israeli airstrike over Damascus believed to be Israeli airstrikes on a major Iranian-backed ammunition depot with at least seven soldiers injured.
  - Iranian Mahmoud Mousavi-Majd, convicted of spying for the CIA and Mossad and on the Revolutionary Guards commander, Qasem Soleimani, is executed by hanging in Iran.
- 22 July –
  - A Hezbollah militant is killed by an Israeli airstrike near Damascus International Airport, Syria, it is the first casualty of Hezbollah by Israel in Syria, with Hezbollah warning of severe consequences.
  - About 2,000 Israelis protest outside the residence of Israel Prime Minister Benjamin Netanyahu over his handling of the COVID-19 crisis and alleged corruption.
- 23 July – Israeli MPs pass a bill to begin the process to outlaw conversion therapy, being the first Middle Eastern country to do so. The bill was passed as two of the main coalition parties joined the opposition in supporting it. It must pass two more approvals to become a new law.
- 27 July – Explosions and exchanges of fire are heard during an armed incident involving Israeli troops and Hezbollah at the border between Israel and Lebanon. Four Hezbollah militants crossed the border and fled back to Lebanon after being shot at, while IDF reported no Israeli casualties. An Israeli shell smashed in a Lebanese civilian home, narrowly missing a family in the house at the time, but nobody was hurt.
- 29 July – Moroccan journalist and human rights activist Omar Radi is arrested and charged with rape and aiding foreign spies. The charges come after Amnesty International reported that the Moroccan government was using Israeli spyware to spy on dissidents like him.

=== August ===
- 2 August – Israeli Prime Minister Benjamin Netanyahu accuses the media of instigating anti-corruption protests against him and downplaying incidents of violence by the protesters. Earlier in the day, the Jerusalem Magistrate's Court ordered his son Yair to take down a Tweet doxing the leaders of the protests.
- 13 August – The Israel–United Arab Emirates peace agreement is announced.
- 30 August – Israel sends 10 elite firefighters to California to assist local firefighters battling some of the largest fires in the state's recent history.

=== September ===
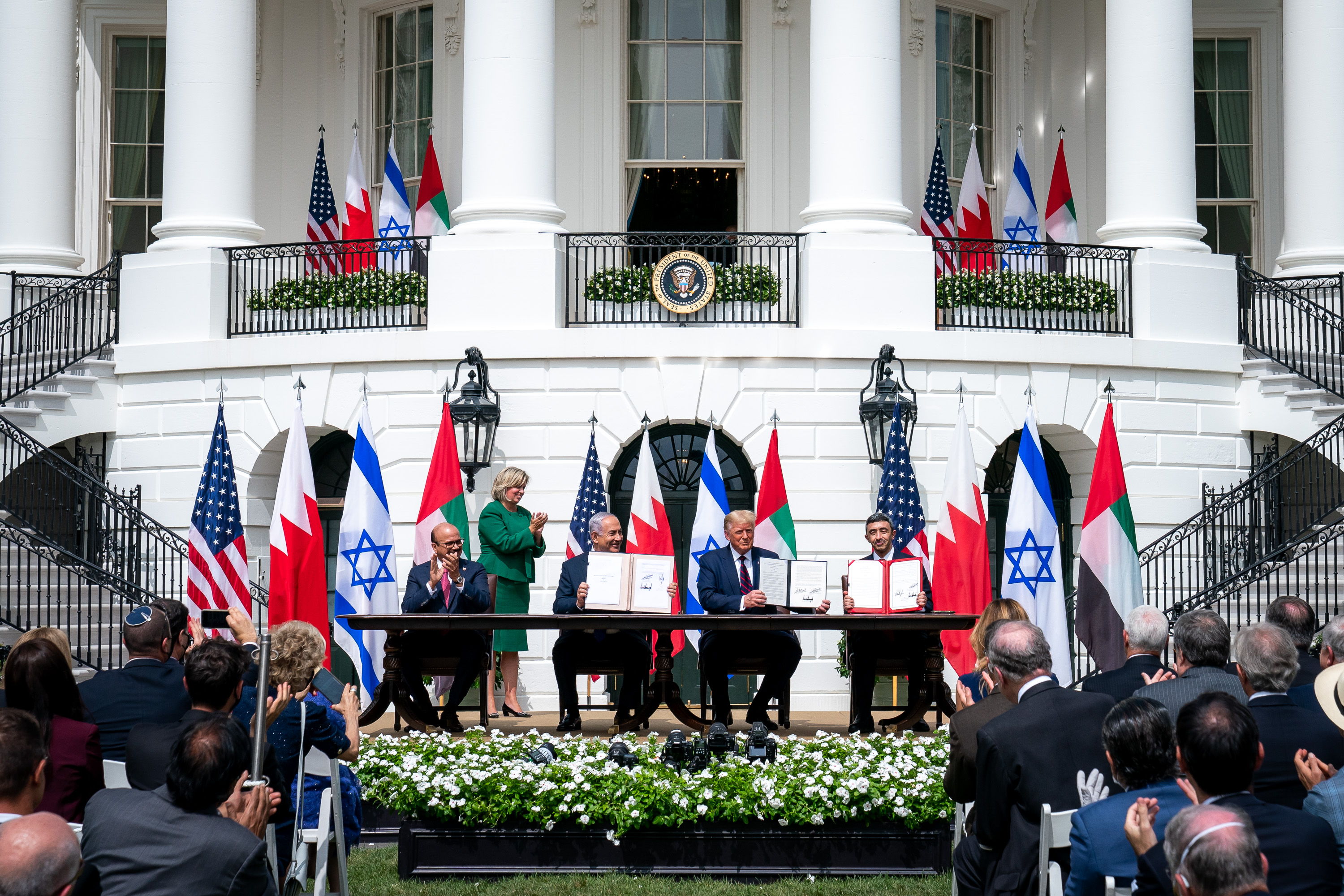
15 September: At the White House, representatives of Israel, the United Arab Emirates, and Bahrain sign agreements establishing diplomatic relations.

- 11 September – The Bahrain–Israel normalization agreement is announced, with the two countries agreeing to establish full diplomatic relations.
- 15 September – Bahrain Foreign Minister Abdullatif bin Rashid Al Zayani, UAE Foreign Minister Abdullah bin Zayed Al Nahyan and Prime Minister Benjamin Netanyahu sign the "Abraham Accords" establishing formal relations between Israel and the two Arab countries, at a ceremony in Washington, D.C.
- 25 September – The government imposes a second, two-week long lockdown in response to the COVID-19 pandemic in Israel, closing all but essential businesses, and strictly limiting movement and public gatherings.
- 30 September – Israel's parliament passes a law authorizing the "special coronavirus emergency" and continuing to limit public gatherings; the law is criticized in particular for limiting demonstrations against Prime Minister Benjamin Netanyahu over alleged corruption and mismanagement of the COVID-19 pandemic in Israel.

=== October ===
- 14 October – Israeli and Lebanese delegations begin talks, facilitated by the United Nations and the United States, over their disputed maritime border.
- 20 – 22 October – The 38th World Zionist Congress is conducted from Jerusalem by online sessions, with the participation of over 700 delegates and thousands of people from 35 countries to elect leadership positions and determine policy for the World Zionist Organization.
- 23 October – The Israel–Sudan normalization agreement, whereby Israel and Sudan agree to normalize relations, is announced, making Sudan the fifth Arab country to establish formal relations with Israel.

=== November ===
- 1 November – Israeli human testing trials for the COVID vaccine begins on 80 volunteers at Sheba Hospital.
- 5 November – The United Nations General Assembly approves a resolution condemning Israeli forces' use of violence against Palestinians. 139 nations voted in favor of the resolution and nine voted against it.
- 9 November – An IsraAid team arrived in Alta Verapaz, Guatemala, following Hurricane Eta, to provide psychological first aid, medical support and relief items, as well as hygiene kits and water filters to help reduce the spread of COVID-19.
- 12 November –
  - An American survivor of an MFO peacekeeper helicopter crash near Sharm el-Sheikh, South Sinai Governorate, Egypt that killed five Americans, a French and a Czech is admitted to Soroka-University Medical Center in Beersheba, Israel.
  - Justice Minister Avi Nissenkorn announces that Israel will begin a nine-month process to legalise and regulate recreational use of cannabis.
- 13 November – An intelligence official says that Abdullah Ahmed Abdullah, Al-Qaeda's second-in-command, accused of helping to mastermind the 1998 bombings of two United States embassies in Africa, was killed in Iran in August by Israeli operatives.
- 19 November – Mike Pompeo visits settlements in the Israeli-occupied territories of West Bank and Golan Heights, making him the first United States Secretary of State to do so.
- 23 November – Prime Minister Benjamin Netanyahu quietly visits Neom, Saudi Arabia for a meeting with Crown Prince Mohammed bin Salman, with Alternate Prime Minister Benny Gantz describing "the leak of the prime minister's secret flight to Saudi Arabia" as "an irresponsible move", while Saudi Arabia denies that such a meeting occurred. Saudi Foreign Minister Faisal bin Farhan Al Saud repeated the 2002 Saudi Arab Peace Initiative offer to fully normalize relations, only after the Palestinians achieve statehood.
- 27 November – Mohsen Fakhrizadeh is assassinated by Mossad agents in a road ambush in Absard using an autonomous satellite-operated gun.
- 28 November –
  - Iranian president Hassan Rouhani vows to "respond" to (Israel), whom the regime has accused of orchestrating the killing, "at the proper time."
  - Protesters gather at the Beit Aghion residence in Jerusalem to call for the resignation of Prime Minister Benjamin Netanyahu for his handling of the COVID-19 pandemic in the country and also while he is on trial for corruption.
- 30 November – Saudi Arabia agrees to allow Israeli commercial flights to cross its airspace for the first time, following high-level talks between Saudi officials and White House senior adviser Jared Kushner.

=== December ===
- 4 December – A 13-year-old Palestinian is killed by Israeli troops during clashes in the West Bank.
- 7 December – Sheikh Hamad bin Khalifa Al Nahyan, a member of the Abu Dhabi royal family, purchases a 50% stake in Israeli Premier League club Beitar Jerusalem F.C., following the establishment of relations between the two countries this year.
- 9 December – The Supreme Court of Iran says it upheld a death sentence against dissident journalist Ruhollah Zam that was levied "more than one month ago", being found guilty of Mofsed-e-filarz ("corruption on earth") on charges of spying for Israel and France.
- 10 December – Morocco and Israel agree to establish diplomatic relations, and Morocco becomes the sixth Arab country to recognize Israel.
- 12 December – Bhutan establishes diplomatic relations with Israel.
- 17 December –
  - The Palestinian Authority impose a two-week lockdown in the entire West Bank that orders schools, universities, restaurants, barbershops, gyms and leisure venues to close. As part of the lockdown, the curfew has also been extended for two weeks.
  - Israeli Justice Minister Avi Nissenkorn signs an extradition order to Australia for accused child sex abuser Malka Leifer, after she was convicted of faking mental illness to avoid extradition earlier this year.
- 19 December – Israeli Prime Minister Benjamin Netanyahu became the first Israeli to receive the vaccine made by Pfizer and BioNTech and getting the shot on live television.
- 20 December –
  - COVID-19 vaccination begins with doses from both Pfizer and Moderna to first immunize healthcare workers, followed by the elderly and others at high-risk.
  - Israeli Border Patrol bans entry of travelers from Denmark, South Africa, and the United Kingdom due to the discovery of a new variant of SARS-CoV-2 in the latter country. Israeli citizens arriving from those countries will be required to quarantine at state-run quarantine hotels for up to 14 days.
- 22 December – El Al operates the first direct commercial flight between Israel and Morocco following the normalization agreement between the two countries on December 10. Senior Advisor to the U.S. President Jared Kushner and Israel's National Security Advisor Meir Ben-Shabbat are among the high-level officials on board the flight.
- 23 December – The 23rd Knesset is dissolved as the deadline to approve the 2020 state budget expires without agreement, requiring elections for the fourth time in less than two years.
- 27 December – A third national lockdown begins since the start of the pandemic in response to a resurgence of COVID-19 infections; most schools remain open.
- 26 December – The Israeli military (IDF) carries out several airstrikes in the Gaza Strip, in response to overnight rocket attacks in Israel. IDF says it targeted a rocket manufacturing site, underground infrastructure and a military post. Two minor injuries are reported. The attacks caused power outages in the eastern part of the strip. Hamas claims the strikes damaged a children's hospital, a centre for disabled people, and damaged the windows of several residential buildings. IDF claims that the damage was due to detonations of ground munitions.
- 30 December – Former American spy Jonathan Pollard and his wife arrive in Israel.

== Deaths ==
- 4 January – Galia Yishai (born 1950), Israeli actress and singer.
- 7 January – Peter Wertheimer (born 1947), wind-instrument musician.
- 12 January – Shlomo Eckstein (born 1929), professor of economics, Rector (1978—1982) and President (1992–1996) of Bar-Ilan University.
- 21 February – Shlomo Aronson), (born 1936), Holocaust historian and professor of political science at Hebrew University of Jerusalem.
- 29 February – Avraham Barkai (born 1921) historian and researcher of antisemitism.
- 13 March – Menahem Ben (born 1948), poet, literary critic, and publicist.
- 16 March – Menachem Friedman (born 1936), sociologist of religious and secular Judaism, professor of sociology at Bar-Ilan University.
- 21 March – Dov Ben-Meir (born 1927), politician, member of the Knesset (1981–1988).
- 21 March – Yitzhak Yamin (born 1938), Iraqi-born painter and sculptor.
- 31 March – Mark Azbel (born 1932), refusenik, solid-state physicist, professor at Tel Aviv University.
- 6 April – Mark Steiner (born 1942), academic and professor of philosophy at the Hebrew University of Jerusalem.
- 7 April – Albert Almoznino (born 1923), hand shadow artist and author.
- 10 April – Dov Ben-Dov (born 1927), Israeli Olympic sports shooter (1952).
- 12 April – Eliyahu Bakshi-Doron (born 1941), rabbi and Rishon LeZion.
- 26 April – Gideon Patt (born 1933), MK and Likud minister.
- 1 May – Reuben Perach (born 1933), Olympic basketball player (1952).
- 2 May – Cheikh Mwijo (born 1937), Moroccan Jewish and Arabic musician and songwriter.
- 6 May – Nahum Rabinovitch (born 1928), Orthodox rabbi and posek, head of Yeshivat Birkat Moshe.
- 10 May – Abraham Yakin (born 1924), Israeli artist.
- 19 May – David Brodman (born 1936), Dutch-Israeli rabbi and peace activist.
- 22 May – Lior Birkan (born 1963), 17 times Israel woman's champion in swimming events.
- 1 June – Daniel Levy (born 1930) Israeli Olympic basketball player (1952).
- 16 June – Tamar Bornstein-Lazar (born 1927), children's books author and educator.
- 21 June – Zeev Sternhell (born 1935), academic and historian.
- 5 July – Naama Tsal (born 1981), editor and writer.
- 2 August – Yael Renan (born 1947), writer and translator, winner of the Tchernichovsky Prize for Translation in 1994.
- 7 August – Adin Steinsaltz (born 1937), rabbi, teacher, philosopher, author, translator and publisher.
- 10 August – Yisroel Moshe Friedman (born 1955), sixth Hasidic Rebbe of Sadigura.
- 15 August – Ruth Gavison (born 1945), human rights expert, professor of Law at the Hebrew University of Jerusalem, member of the Israel Academy of Sciences and Humanities and recipient of the Israel Prize.
- 16 August – Gershon Shafat (born 1927), politician, member of the Knesset (1984–1992).
- 20 August – Zalman Nechemia Goldberg (born 1931), rabbi, posek, rosh yeshiva, Encyclopedia Talmudit editor and Jerusalem Rabbinical High Court head.
- 24 August – Avner Golasa (born 1957), soccer player for (Hapoel Kfar Saba).
- 10 September – Gerald Yakov Blidstein (born 1938), author, academic, and professor emeritus of Jewish Philosophy, Israel Prize laureate in Jewish philosophy, member of the Israel Academy of Sciences and Humanities.
- 20 September – Meron Benvenisti (born 1934), political scientist, author and deputy mayor of Jerusalem.
- 20 September – Moshe Sharoni (born 1929), advocate for the rights of the elderly, Member of the Knesset 2006–2009.
- 21 September – Amos Lin (born 1933), Israeli Olympic basketball player (1952).
- 26 September – Moshe Efrati (born 1934), choreographer, founder and artistic director of the Kol Demama Dance Company, and Israel Prize laureate for Dance.
- 2 October – Victor Zalgaller (born 1920), mathematician in the fields of geometry and optimization.
- 4 October – Mordechai Yissachar Ber Leifer (born 1955), Hasidic rabbi, third Rebbe of the Pittsburgh Hasidic Dynasty.
- 7 October – Eitan Haber (born 1940), journalist, author and publicist.
- 8 October – Shlomo Gazit (born 1926), Israel Defense Forces Major General, Military Intelligence Directorate head, president of Ben-Gurion University, and director-general of the Jewish Agency.
- 9 October – David Refael ben Ami (born 1950), singer and anthologist of Hasidic melodies.
- 10 October – Amnon Freidberg (born 1945), entomologist of taxa of flies.
- 12 October – Yehoshua Kenaz (born 1937), novelist.
- 16 October – Itzhak Ilan (born 1956), Israel Security Agency official, former deputy director of the Shin Bet.
- 17 October – Michael Strauss (born 1934), business man and industrialist.
- 18 October – David Kushnir (born 1931), Israeli Olympic long jumper (1956, 1960), footballer (Hapoel Balfouria), and athletics coach.
- 20 October – Yehoshua Blau (born 1919), scholar of Arabic language and literature, professor emeritus at the Hebrew University of Jerusalem.
- 23 October – Yehuda Barkan (born 1945), actor, screenwriter, film producer and director.
- 6 November – Nathan Zach (born 1930), academic, poet, Bialik Prize and Israel Prize recipient.
- 8 November – Raphael Hadane (born 1923), Ethiopian-Israeli religious leader, Kahen of Beta Israel.
- 12 November – Jacob M. Landau (born 1924), academic, professor emeritus of political science at the Hebrew University of Jerusalem and Israel Prize laureate.
- 14 December – Moshe Mendelbaum (born 1933), Israeli economist, Governor of the Bank of Israel 1982–1986.
- 16 December – Yaakov Agmon (born 1929), Israeli theatre producer, manager and director, founder of Beit Lessin Theater.
- 23 December – Rika Zaraï (born 1938), singer and writer.
- 24 December – Yehuda Henkin (born 1945), Orthodox rabbi and posek
- 28 December – Moshe Brawer (born 1919), geographer, mapmaker and Israel Prize winner.
- 30 December – Yehoshua Matza (born 1931), Israel Bonds CEO, member of Knesset (1984-2002), and former Minister of Health (1996–1999).

== See also ==
- 2019–20 Israeli constitutional crisis
- 2019–20 Israeli political crisis
- COVID-19 pandemic in Israel
- Timeline of the Israeli–Palestinian conflict, 2020
