= Ganim (disambiguation) =

Ganim was an Israeli settlement in the northern West Bank.

Ganim may also refer to:

- Ganim (surname)
- Be'er Ganim, a settlement in southern Israel
- Ein Ganim, a former institution in Ottoman Palestine
- Ir Ganim, a neighborhood in southwest Jerusalem
- Maccabi Ein Ganim F.C., a former Israeli football club based in Petah Tikva

== See also ==
- Engannim (disambiguation)
- Jenin (disambiguation)
