= Janin =

Janin may refer to:

== People ==
First name

- Janin Lindenberg (born 1987), German track and field athlete
- Janin Reinhardt (born 1981), German television presenter and actress

Family name

- Albert Stanley Janin (1881-1931), U.S. hydro-airplane inventor
- Jules Janin (1804-1874), French writer and critic
- Maurice Janin (1862-1946), French general
- Michael Janin, DC Comics comic book artist
- Pascal Janin (born 1956), French footballer and football manager
- Raymond Janin, (1882-1972), French Byzantinologist
- Zuzanna Janin (born 1961), Polish visual artist and actor

== Places ==
- Jenin, Palestinian city
- Janin, Kuyavian-Pomeranian Voivodeship (north-central Poland)
- Janin, Podlaskie Voivodeship (north-east Poland)
- Janin, Masovian Voivodeship (east-central Poland)
- Janin, Pomeranian Voivodeship (north Poland)
- Stary Janin

== See also ==
- Jenin (disambiguation)
- Janin Plot, a biochemical visualisation method
