= Engannim =

Engannim or Ein Ganim (Hebrew: עין גנים) may refer to:

== Modern places ==
- Ein Ganim, a moshav, later a neighborhood in Petah Tikva

== Ancient places ==
- Anem, or En-gannim, biblical city belonging to the Tribe of Issachar, identified with modern-day Jenin
- Gina (Canaan)
- Engannim, biblical city in Judah, identified with the archaeological site of Horbat Gannim, near modern Yish'i

== See also ==
- Ganim (disambiguation)
