= Zarzir =

Town in Israel

Zarzir: זַרְזִיר; زرزير
- Local council (from 1997)

Hebrew transcription(s)
  - ISO 259: Zarzir
  - Also spelled: Bet Zarzir (official)
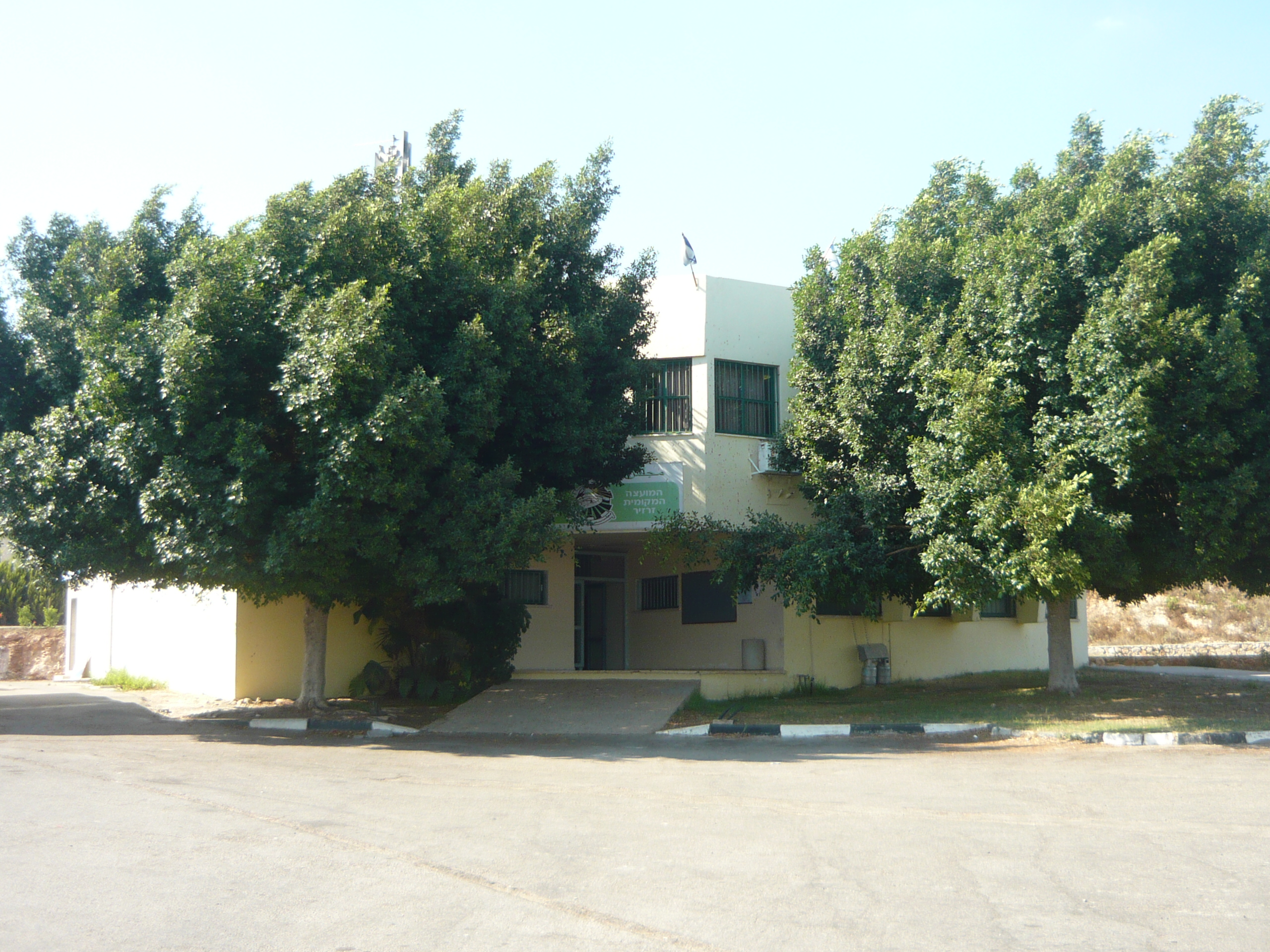
- Council headquarters

- Location within Jezreel Valley region of Israel
- Coordinates: 32°43′38″N 35°13′29″E
- Country: Israel
- District: Northern
- Subdistrict: Jezreel
- Natural Region: Nazareth-Tir'an Mountains

Area
  - Total: 3,889 dunams (3.889 km^{2}; 1.502 sq mi)

Population (2024)
  - Total: 9,149
  - Density: 2,353/km^{2} (6,093/sq mi)

Zarzir (Arabic: زرزير, Hebrew: זַרְזִיר), also known as Beit Zarzir, is an Arab local council located 10 kilometres (6.2 mi) west of the city of Nazareth in the Northern District of Israel. The residents are primarily Bedouin, made up of five Bedouin tribes, Mazarib, Grifat, Haib, Jawamis, and Eyadat. It was granted the status of a local council in 1996. .

Ataf Grifat is the current head of the local council.

In March 2026 sixty residents of the town were injured during an Iranian ballistic missile attack. Over 300 homes were also damaged.

== Population ==
In 2024, it had a population of 9,149

=== Mazarib tribe ===
The Mazarib tribe is the largest tribe with a population of 2700 residents. Most of the members are involved in the security forces, including the IDF, police force and general security forces. Abed al Magid Mazarib was the first Bedouin officer in the IDF. They are also involved in agriculture and the building industry. They tend to live independently within Zarzir and run their town elementary school, mosque, and cemetery.

=== Grifat tribe ===
The Grifat tribe is made up of 2500 people who are all related with clear genealogical ties to each other. They all live in one place. Ataf Grifat, the head of the local council since 2013 is a descendant of the founders of the Zarzir Grifats.

Many of the tribe members are academics and serve in the security forces and education system. Others raise cattle and trade them or are involved in agriculture.

=== Haib tribe ===
A breakaway group of this tribe settled on the hilltop of Abu Siah of Zarzir in 1943 and remains there since then. In 1946 70 members of the tribe joined the Palmach. The "Pal Haib" unit was renown for its fierce fighting abilities. Hussein Ismail Abu Yosef Haib became the first Bedouin to receive the rank of Lieutenant Colonel. He was the head of the Zarzir local council from 1996 until 2013.

The Haib tribe, located in other communities in the North of Israel are considered the largest Bedouin tribe in the North.

=== Jawamis tribe ===
There are 1200 members of the Jawamis tribe in Zarzir, and all are related. They are primarily in the security forces, agriculture and building. They have their own elementary school, mosque, cemetery and internal leadership committee.

=== Eyadat tribe ===
This tribe has 1000 members and has a high level of academics. They are originally from the nomadic tribes in Syria and Lebanon and settled in Zarzir in 1974. Many are in the security forces and others work in education or the local industries.

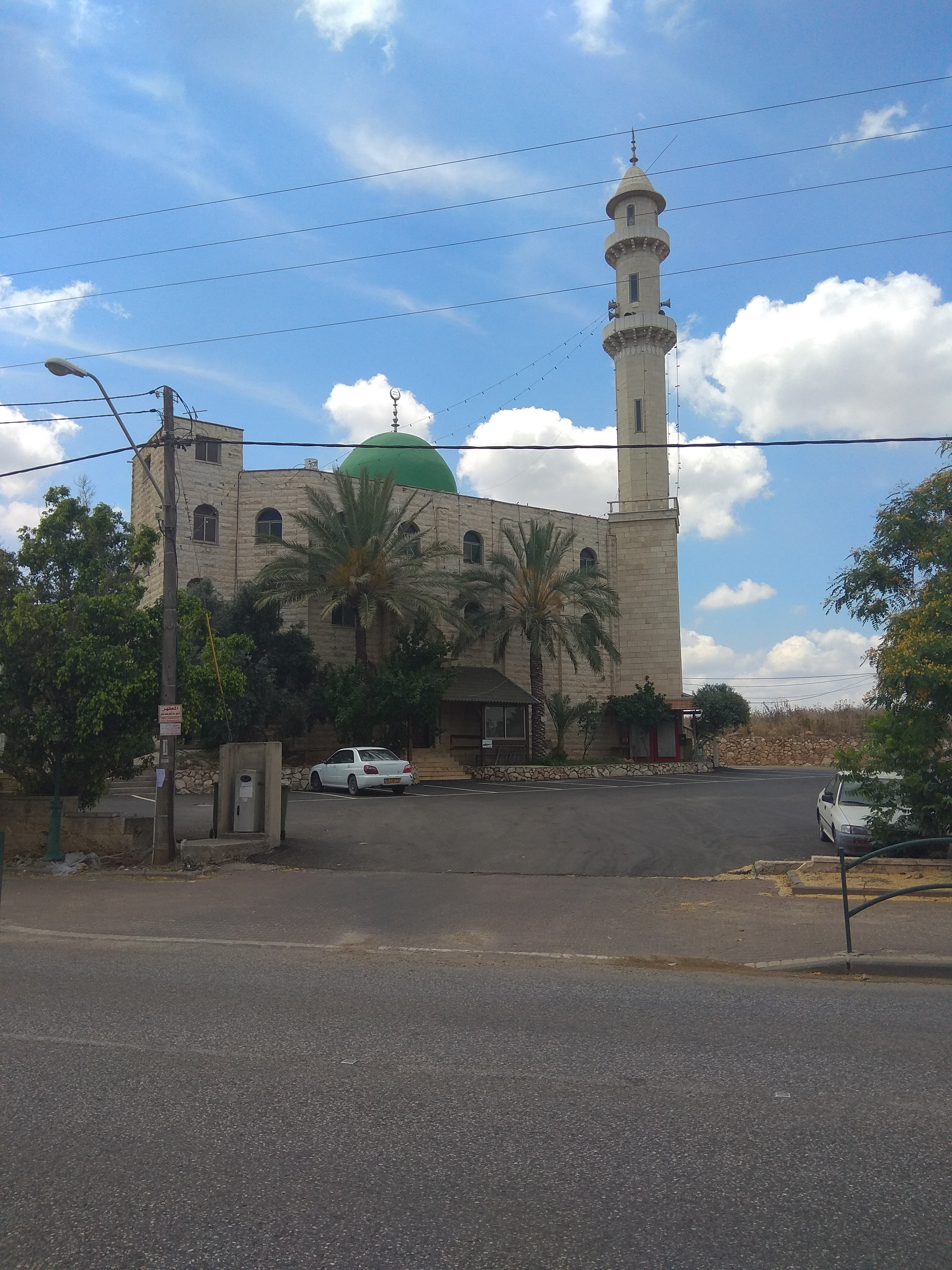
Zarzir mosque

== Monument to the Bedouin Soldier ==
A few kilometres away, at HaMovil Junction, there is a memorial to the Bedouin soldiers of the IDF killed since 1948, 230 of them by 2022. The Monument to the Bedouin Soldier (sometimes translated a Fighter or Warrior), established at a site close to Bedouin and other Israeli Arab towns, was inaugurated on Independence Day in 1993 by then-Prime Minister Yitzhak Rabin. The memorial includes a museum of Bedouin heritage and a garden with medicinal herbs.

== Demographics ==
Historical population
Year	Pop.	±%
1983	3,100	—
1995	4,700	+51.6%
2008	6,200	+31.9%
2022	8,836	+42.5%
2024	9,149	+3.5%

== Voting Patterns ==
In the 2022 election, 83 percent of voters in Zarzir voted for the Arab parties, while 13 percent voted for the parties of the center-left coalition led by Yair Lapid and 4 percent voted for the parties of the right-wing coalition led by Benjamin Netanyahu. Among the voters for the Arab parties, 89 percent voted for Ra'am, while 6 percent voted for Balad and 5 percent voted for the Hadash–Ta'al list.

In the 2026 election, 92 percent of voters in Zarzir voted for the Arab parties, while 6 percent voted for the parties of the center-left coalition led by Gadi Eisenkot and 0.9 percent voted for the parties of the right-wing coalition led by Benjamin Netanyahu. Among the voters for the Arab parties, 90 percent voted for Ra'am, while 10 percent voted for the Joint List. Voter turnout increased 94 percent from the 2022 election.

== See also ==
- Arab localities in Israel
- Israeli Bedouin
