= Galilee Bedouin =

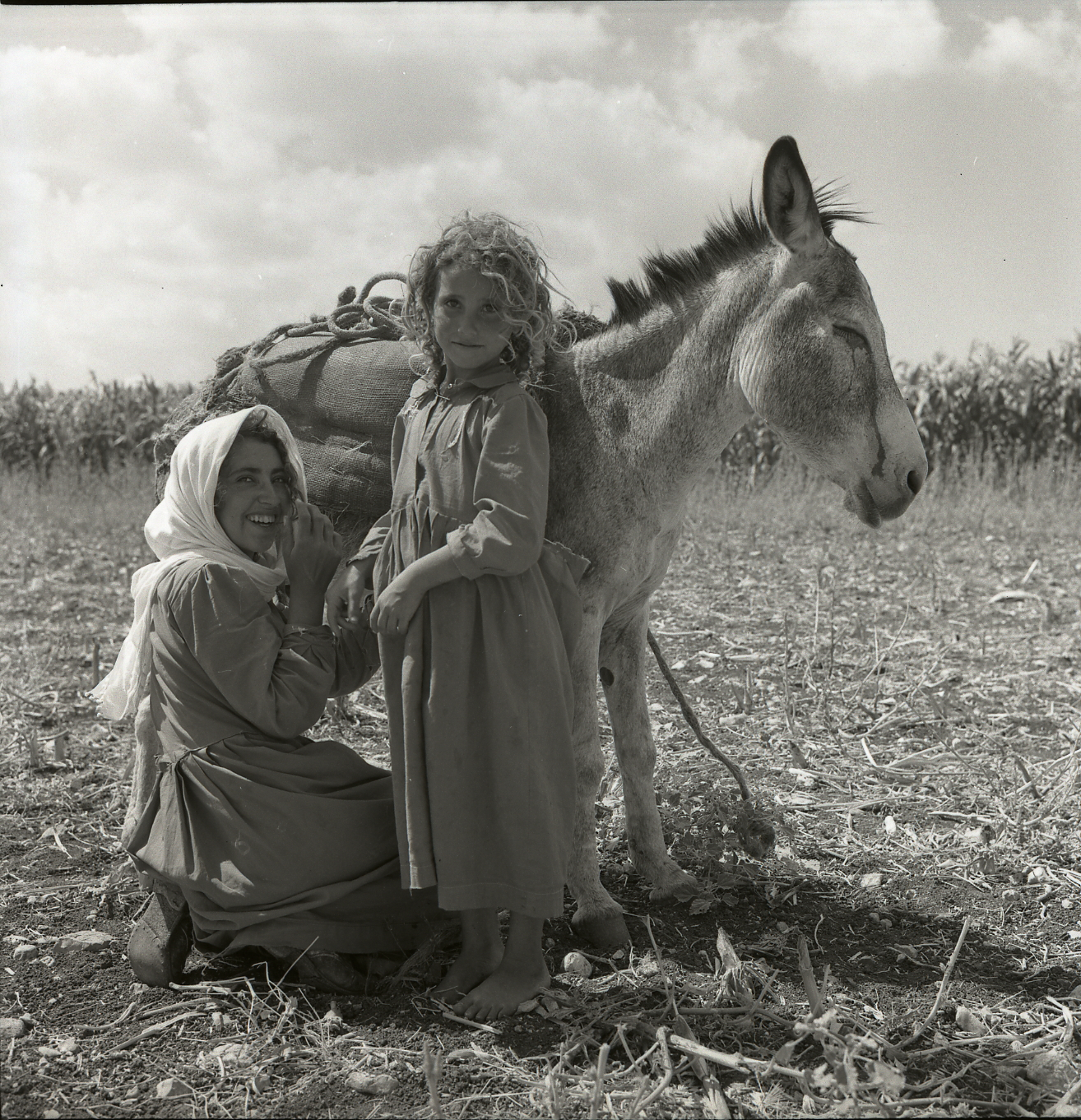
- Galilee Bedouin women in Zarzir, 1962

Total population
- 50,000

Regions with significant populations

Languages
- Native language: Levantine Bedawi Arabic Secondary language: Modern Hebrew

Religion
- Islam

Related ethnic groups
- Other Bedouin

Galilee Bedouin (Arabic: بدو الجليل; Hebrew: בדואי גלילי) are Bedouin living in the Galilee region of Northern Israel. In contrast to Negev Bedouin, Galilee Bedouin come from the Syrian desert. As of 2020, there are about 50,000 Galilee Bedouin, living in 28 recognized settlements and also living in mixed cities with other non-Bedouin Arabs.

For more see Bedouin: Israel.

== Demographics ==
Galilee Bedouins were overlooked in population estimates and surveys due to their nomadic nature and small numbers.

"The Arab clans in Philistia and Sharon are too numerous and insignificant to require notice; and in Galilee also there is a large number of very small tribes"

=== 1800s ===
Galilee Bedouins numbered 5,000 in 1880 and were estimated at 8,740 for 1880-1883 by the C.R. Conder and H.H. Kitchener Survey 1881-1883. A wide range likely due to the nomadic and seminomadic nature of these tribes.

"Description de L'Egypte" (1812) published a list of Jaubert's statistics of nomadic tribes. The table below is the selection of the graph on the tribes of Galilee. Ghazi Falah notes that:

"Jaubert's statistics were in fact estimates of the power of tribes and not population. Using the number of horsemen in order to estimate the population of a Bedouin tribe is unrealistic, particularly when the information, derived from the tribesmen themselves was exaggerated to demonstrate tribal power. Burckhardt (1822) who was present at the same time in the east came to similar conclusions when he tried to estimate the Anezeh Tribes: 'It is difficult to ascertain the numbers of each tribe for a prejudice which forbids them to count the horsemen, as they believe, like the eastern merchants, that whoever knows the exact amount of his wealth may soon expect to lose part of it.' Despite the fact that Jaubert's list was incomplete (9 tribes out of 14 were not counted), Jaubert's information is valuable since he also recorded the approximate location of each tribe, thus making it possible to trace subsequent tribal migrations."

Tribes	Horsemen
Berārych	200
Mesaid	200
Halef	(few)
Samkyeh	(many)
Soumerat	(many)
Gāātyn	(many)
Khayt Beouādy	1000
Bechātoueh	(few)
Ghaur	300
Sekhour el Ghaur	300
Ghaouarheh	(unknown)
Sabyeh	(unknown)
Nemyret	(unknown)
Mohammedat	(unknown)

Tribal groups camping in Shafa 'Amr vicinity and Marj Ibn 'Amir (1881 - 1883) by C.R. Conder and H.H. Kitchener. "The Survey of Western Palestine Memoirs of the Topography, Orography, Hydrology and Archaeology", The Committee of the Palestine Exploration. Fund, London,

- Arab el Tuwal
- Arab el Hujeirat
- Arab el Mureisat
- Arab Zebeidat
- Arab Hulf
- Tawat-hah
- Beni Gowa (or Benihah)
- 'Awadin
- Shageirat
- Beni S'aidan
- 'Alakineh
- Naghnaghiyeh

=== 1900s ===
Bedouins numbers 30,000 in 1981. "[...] In 1980 the settled Bedouin in the Negev and Galilee formed 12% of Israel's Arab population. They also formed 2% of the total population of the state in the same year."

Year	1922	1931	1945	1948
Persons	13,420	11,786	17,100	5,000

* The tribal groups of Beisan (Beit She'an) subdistrict are excluded.

== List of Tribes ==
- Berārych
- Mesaid
- Halef
- Samkyeh
- Soumerat
- Arab Al Samniyyah
- Gāātyn
- Khayt Beouādy
- Bechātoueh
- Ghaur
- Sekhour el Ghaur
- Ghaouarheh
- Sabyeh
- Nemyret
- Mohammedat
- Arab el Tuwal
- Arab el Hujeirat
- Arab el Mureisat
- Arab Zebeidat
- Arab Hulf
- Tawat-hah
- Beni Gowa (or Benihah)
- 'Awadin
- Shageirat
- Beni S'aidan
- 'Alakineh
- Naghnaghiyeh
- Arab el Ghareifat
- Arab es Sa'ideh
- Arab el Kābiyeh
- Khalf
- Kmirat
- Khualed
- Rmihat
- Arab el Heib
- Suad

== Clothing ==
=== Women's Clothing ===
==== Thobe or Shirsh ====
The clothing of Galilee Bedouins differed greatly from the clothing of the Negev Bedouins and of Galilee villagers and townspeople.

Women wore thobes with long, straight, and narrow sleeves. The thobes have a long, triangle opening in the front extending from the collar to the waist (the opening was covered by a garment worn underneath). The dresses were originally made from local cotton dyed blue in the 19th century but by the late 19th century imported black cotton became more popular. Younger women transitioned to black satin and black velvet in the 1960s and 1980s respectively.

Unlike other Palestinian ensembles, Galilee Bedouin thobes do not have girdles or a cloth belt. The thobe was usually made of cotton and reached around 131 centimeters, 52 inches, or about 4’ 4’’; reaching the ankle or grazing the floor.

==== Embroidery ====
The thobes had very little embroidery. Most of that embroidery was focused on the seams, collar, and the bottom of the skirt. The seams of the dress often had a fishbone stitch, the neck opening often had a stem stitch, the pocket opening had a buttonhole stitch, and the skirt (especially the hem) often had a zigzag stitch with large gaps creating triangle and diamond patterns. Other stitches that featured on the dress were the satin stitch, reverse stem stitch, and herringbone stitch. However, occasionally women embroidered four or five bands above the hem.

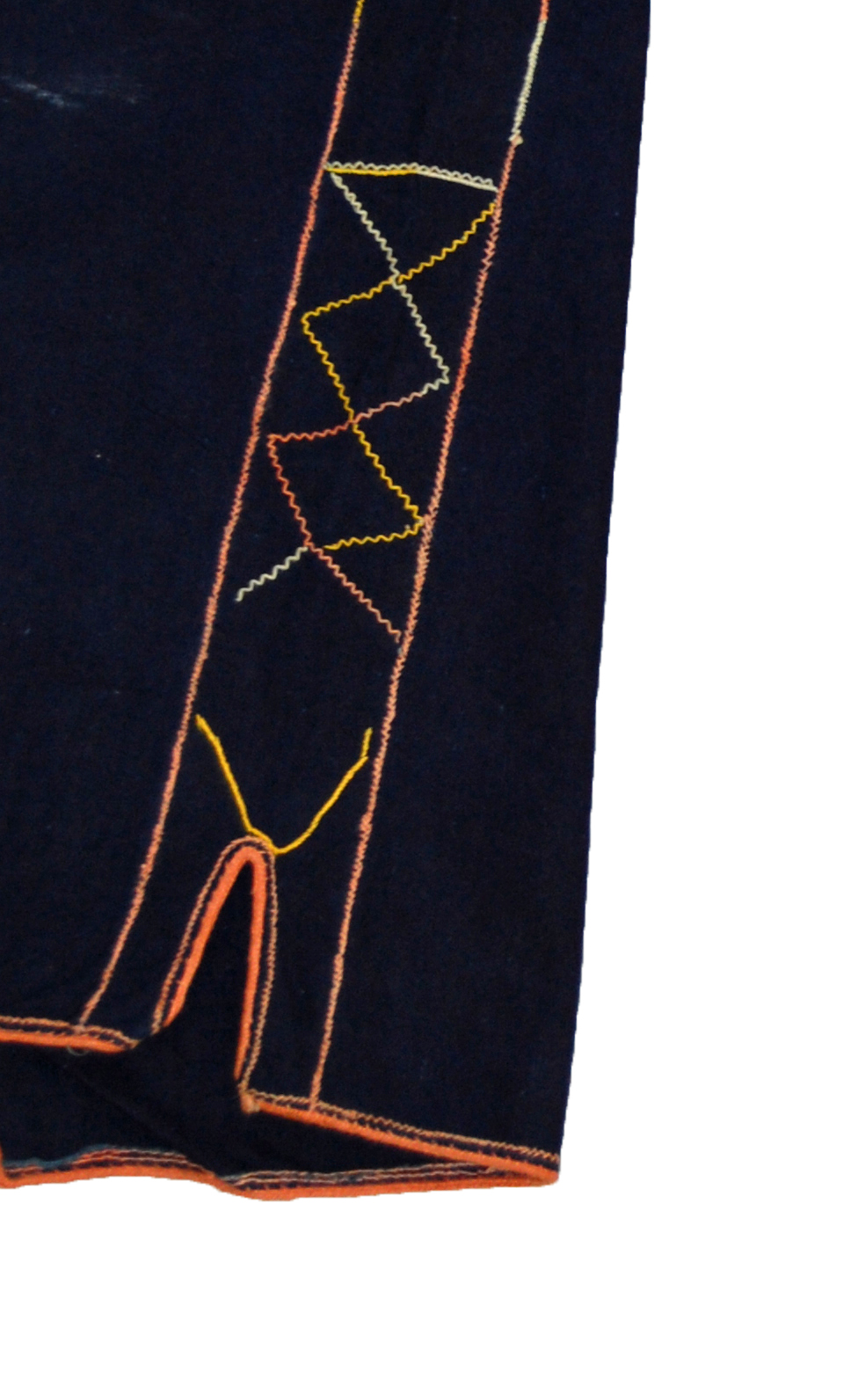
Basic stem stitch and zigzag stitch - diamond and triangular shapes.

Apart from embroidery, dresses were decorated with light blue bands of fabric being inserted above the hems and in the sleeves of dresses after the switch to black dresses by the end of the 19th century. Perhaps as a way of reusing the light blue fabric.

In the 1930s embroidery thread came in white, however, by the 1960s a wide variety of colors was used. Hand embroidery faded out and was almost entirely replaced by machine embroidery by the 1980s. However, the style of embroidery did not change majorly with the new use of machines. This style of embroidery is said to be similar to village women in South Syria and North Jordan, likely due to Galilee Bedouins having pastured their livestock east of Lake Tiberias.

==== Jackets ====
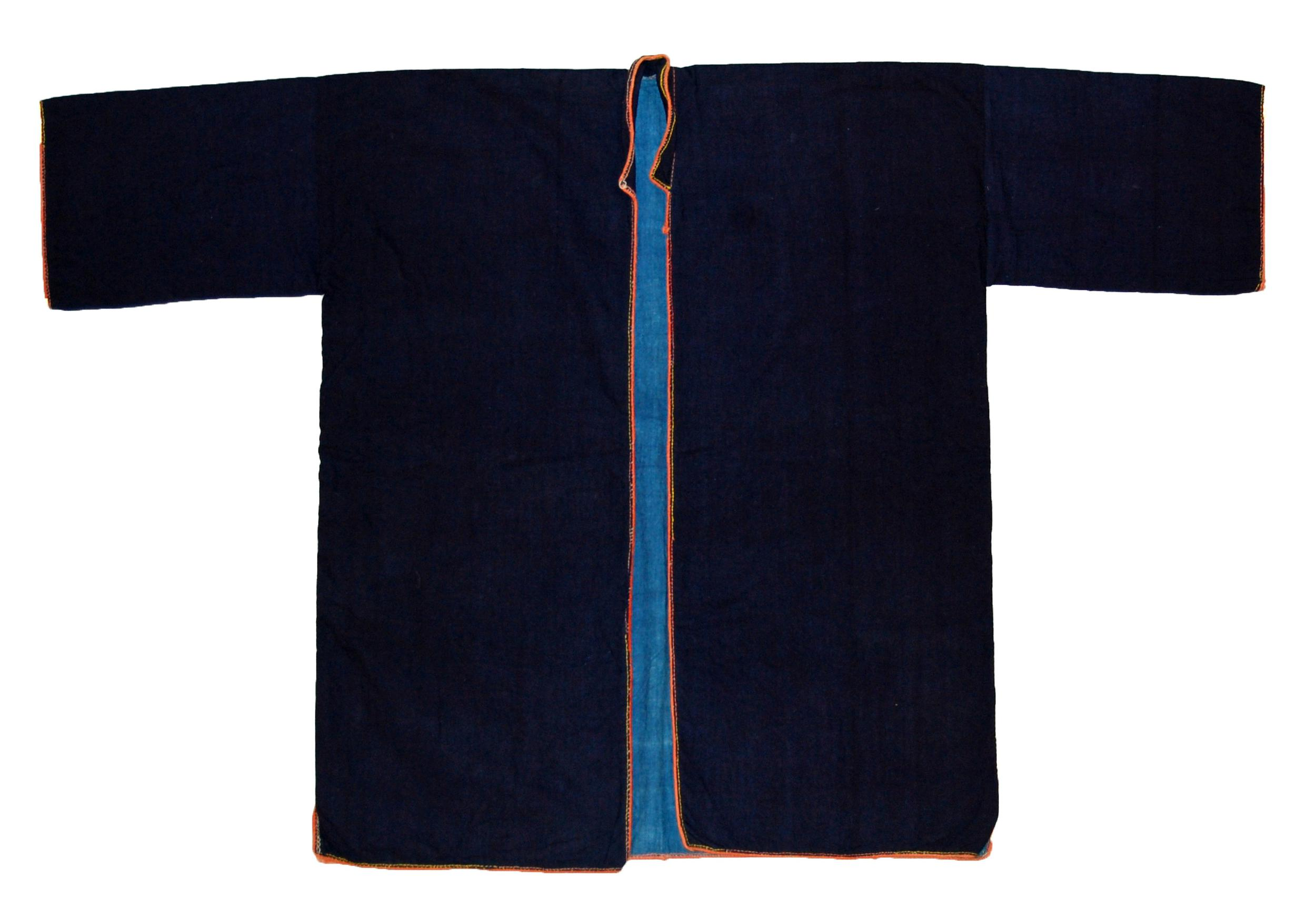
Woman's jacket with short, raised collar made of indigo dyed cotton.

Over this they optionally wore a short-sleeved jacket with short, raised collar. The jackets are made from wool or cotton dyed a dark indigo blue. The jackets usually had some trimming with braided cord on the edges, in colors such as black or an orange-red. Some jackets also had vents along the sides, about 3.5 inches long. The jackets usually came with no embroidery, when embroidery did appear it was sparse and featured as a narrow strip on the sides. This embroidery used a basic stem stitch and a zigzag stitch. The embroidery thread could come in many colors.

==== Headscarves ====
The women wore a headscarf that covered the neck with a triangle fold of fabric. The headscarf could be tied with an asbeh, a stiff headband used to hold their headscarves in place, occasionally decorated with coins on the front. The asbeh was 13 wide and 3.5 inches in height.

Sometimes women didn't wear a headband and wrapped their head scarfs similar to the Taureg people, folded in a crisscross manner over the forehead, occasionally a spare length of fabric was thrown over the shoulder down the back. Women often showed fringe through the front of their headscarf.

== Gallery ==
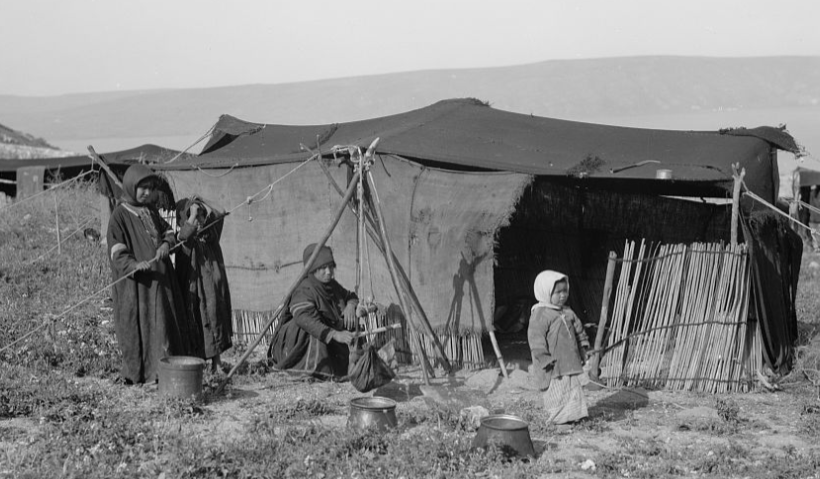
Galilee Bedouin woman and girls in front of tent, churning butter.

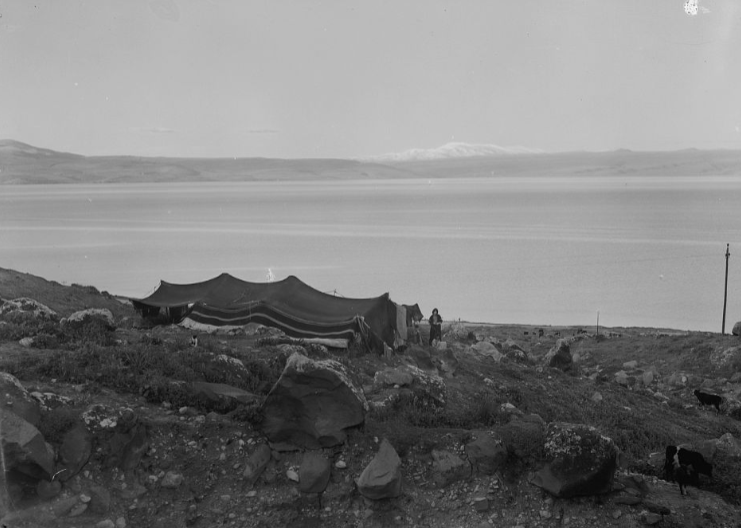
Galilee & Hermon with Bedouin tent in foreground.

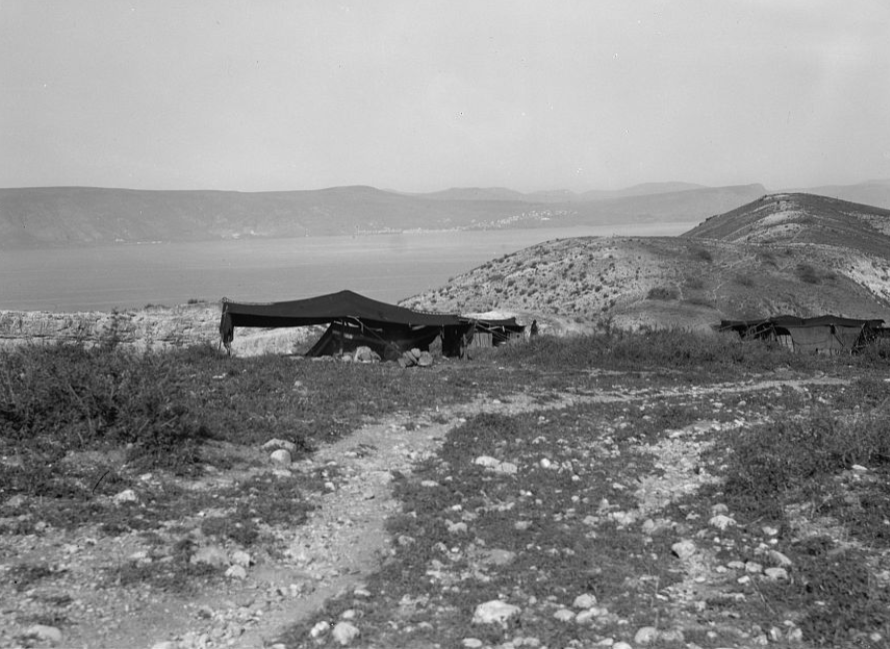
Bedouin tent near the foot of Gamala, Sea of Galilee in background.

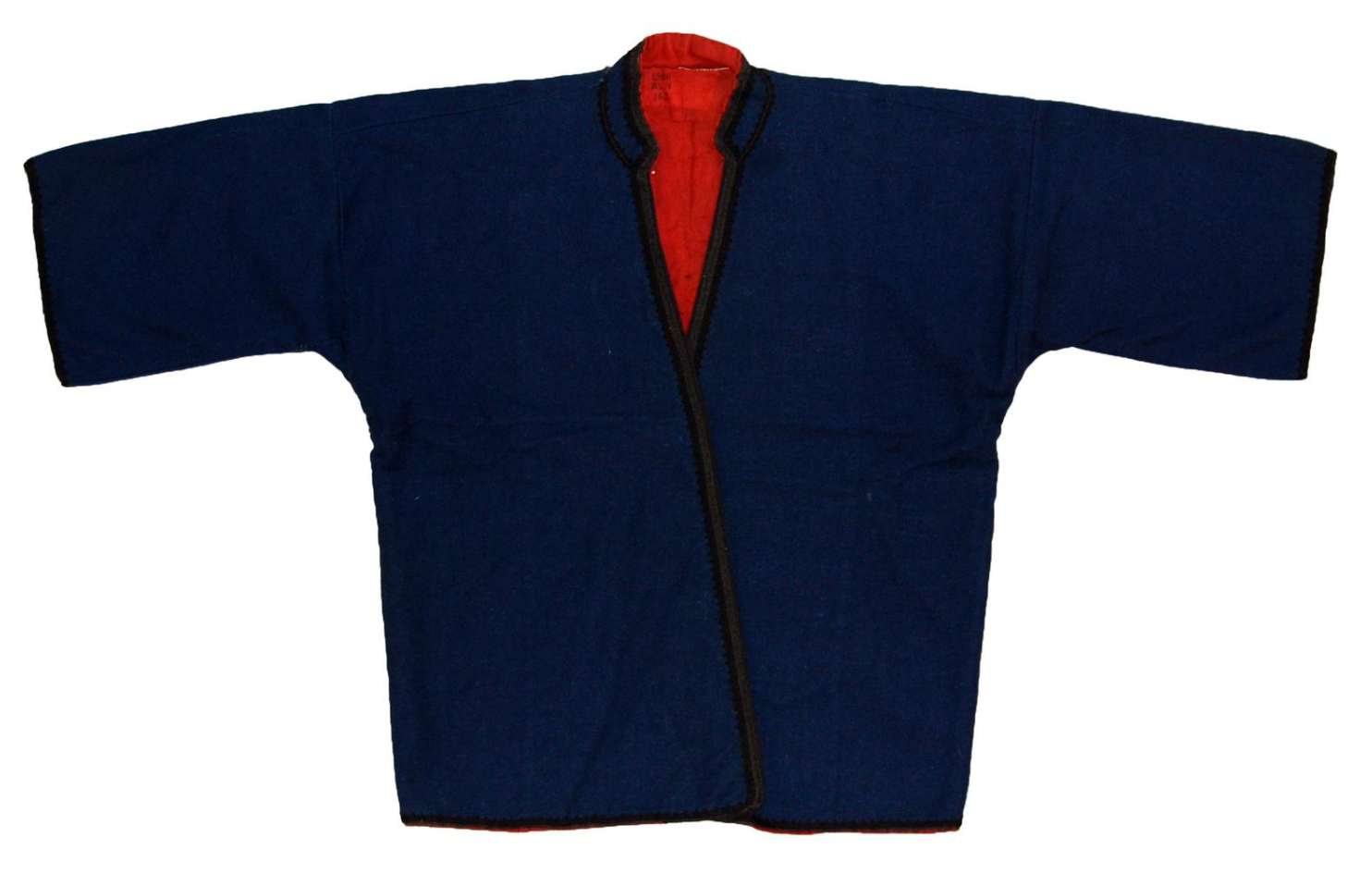
Galilee Bedouin Jacket in indigo wool.

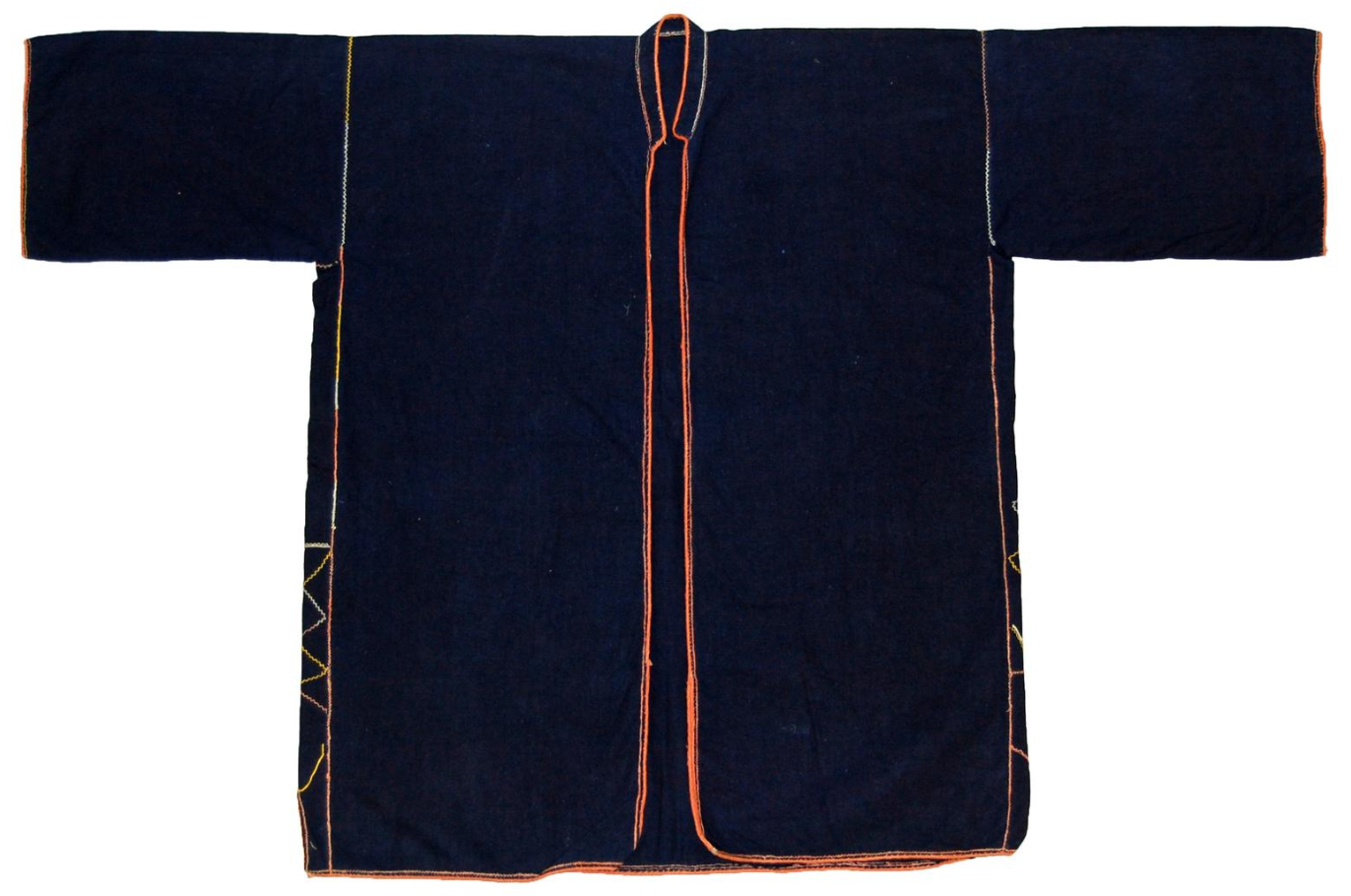
Galilee Bedouin Jacket With Zigzag Embroidery

== See also ==
- Israeli Bedouin
  - Negev Bedouin
- Palestinian Bedouin
