= Jenin (disambiguation) =

Jenin could refer to the following places:

- Jenin, a city in Palestine
- Jenin, Poland, a village in Poland
- Jenin, Syria, a village in the Tartus Governorate, Syria

== See also ==
- Janin (disambiguation)
- Ganim (disambiguation)
