= Moshe Peled (soldier) =

Israeli general (1925-2000)

- מוסא פלד
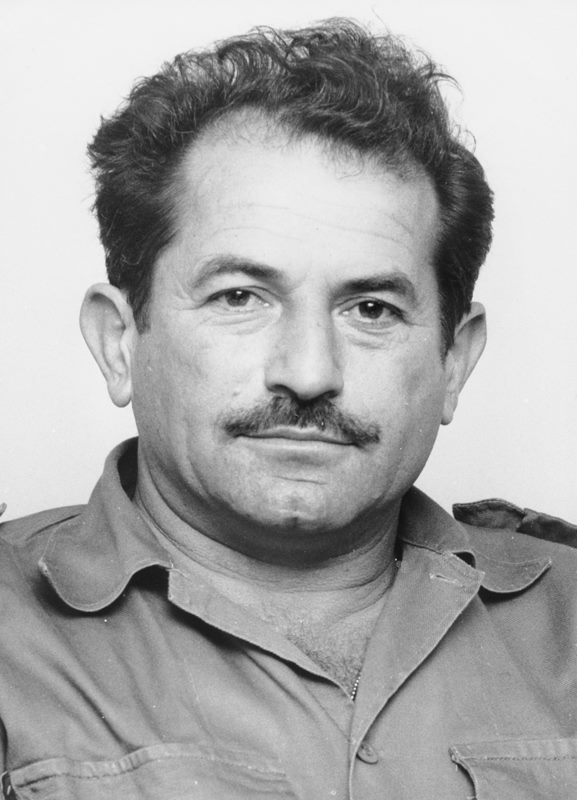
- Born: July 31, 1925; Ein Ganim
- Died: April 16, 2000 (aged 74)
- Resting place: Nahalal Cemetery
- Occupation: Israeli military commander

Moshe "Musa" Peled (Hebrew: משה (מוסא) פלד; July 31, 1925 - April 16, 2000) was an Israeli military commander, Aluf (Major General) of the Israel Defense Forces. His last position in the IDF was Commander of the Israeli Armored Corps. After that he was CEO of Rafael Advanced Defense Systems (1987-1992) and head of Yad La-Shiryon, the Armored Corps Memorial Site and Museum at Latrun (1986-2000). He was Commander of the IDF Command and Staff College (1969-1972).

He was born in Ein Ganim (now within Petah Tikva) to Zalman Eisenberg and Shoshana, daughter of Baruch Golomb and joined the Haganah at the age of 14.
