= Tamar Bornstein-Lazar =

Israeli children's writer (1927–2020)

Tamar Bornstein-Lazar תמר בּוֹרְנְשְׁטֵיין-לָזָר
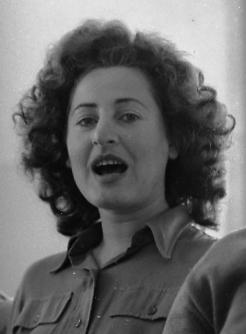
- Born: Esther Streit; May 1, 1927; Ein Ganim
- Died: 16 June 2020 (aged 93); Ein Ganim
- Burial place: Segula Cemetery
- Occupations: Children's author, educator
- Children: 3

Tamar Bornstein-Lazar (Hebrew: תמר בּוֹרְנְשְׁטֵיין-לָזָר; May 1, 1927 – June 16, 2020) was an Israeli children's writer who was best known for her book series featuring the monkeys Kofiko and Chipopo.

== Early life ==
Bornstein-Lazar was born and grew up in Ein Ganim, studied at Ahad HaAm High School in Petah Tikva, and later studied at the Teachers' College in Givat HaShlosha. During the 1948 Arab–Israeli War, she served in a military band and was a teacher at Gordon School in Petah Tikva.

== Career ==
In 1950, Bornstein-Lazar began a literary career. From that year on, she published hundreds of stories for young children for the majority of children's newspapers in Israel, which were later compiled into numerous books. In 1955, Bornstein-Lazar won the Yatziv Award for her literary work. Additionally, she began publishing a series of story compilations about the Jewish holiday periods.

Bornstein-Lazar's first story was published in Davar LiLadim on February 2, 1951. The story was called haYalda mhaMa'abara v'haKochav miMarom (הילדה מהמעברה והכוכב ממרום, lit: "The Girl from the Ma'abara and the Star from the Sky"). Its plot revolves around a star who brings a goat to a Ma'abara to heal an ill girl using goat milk. Her second story, Lama Shchorot Kanfei haOrev (למה שחורות כנפי העורב, lit: "Why Are the Crow's Wings Black"), appeared three months later.

In 1957, Bornstein-Lazar began publishing her famous books about Kofiko and Chipopo, following the adventures of the two monkeys (Kofiko in Israel, Chipopo abroad). Both series have spanned dozens of books and were hugely successful in Israel. The books were met with negative reception from certain educators and literary critics due to what they referred to as "low-level writing".

Since 1965, she wrote another children's book series about an American child named Charlie Letch and his adventures in Israel. In 1969, she began writing a series titled The Adventures of Suliman and Danny, about two friends (Danny a Jew, Suliman an Arab).

Bornstein-Lazar was married to Shlomo (Shlomke) and had three daughters: Noga and the twins Odelia and Zahara. The names of her family members are also those of the characters in the Kofiko book series.

She wrote one adult book under the pen name "B. L. ONZ" (the initials of her daughters' names and surname: Bornstein-Lazar Odelia Noga Zahara).

Her personal archive is preserved in the National Library and numbered ARC. 4* 2075.

Bornstein-Lazar died on June 16, 2020, aged 93 and was buried in Segula Cemetery.
