= Moshe Efrati =

Israeli choreographer (1934–2020)

- משה אפרתי
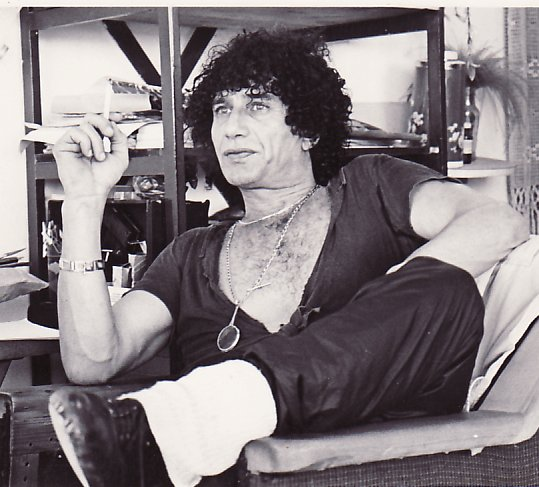
- Born: 1934
- Died: 26 September 2020 (aged 85–86)
- Occupation: Choreographer
- Known for: Founder and Artistic Director of Kol Demama Dance Company
- Awards: Israel Prize (1996)

Moshe Efrati (Hebrew: משה אפרתי; 26 – 1934 September 2020) was an Israeli choreographer and the founder and artistic director of the Kol Demama Dance Company, based in Tel Aviv. His works have been performed in venues around the world.

== Dance career ==
Efrati was one of the first members of the Batsheva Dance Company. In 1975, he left Batsheva and established Kol Demama (The Sound of Silence) integrating ten dancers with hearing impairment together with ten dancers with normal hearing. Efrati cued the hearing impaired dancers by pounding a board on the floor or having a dancer stomp on the floor, creating a vibration that could be picked up by the dancers feet, similar to theories of an elephant hearing via vibrations perceived through its feet. Nijinsky is said to have used this method to cue his dancers for Stravinsky’s The Rite of Spring, as the rhythms were too complex for Nijinsky’s dancers to follow. The dancers also get their cues from the vibration of bass notes in the music, eye contact, touch, movement of others, and lighting cues, all woven into the choreography. Kol Demama has a Tel Aviv school for dancers, teaching several hundred young dancers each year. Efrati intended Kol Demama to be judged on artistic grounds, "I am neither a social worker nor therapist, I am a dance creator."

Efrati blended strictly formal and classical ballet choreographic vocabulary with free-form contemporary dance. He drew inspiration from diverse influences ranging from Kafka's The Metamorphosis and Samuel Beckett's surrealism to the Old Testament and the Jewish Poets of Muslim Spain. His dance was set to music ranging from traditional early Spanish rhythms to contemporary electronic music.

Efrati worked with the former president of Israel, Yitzhak Navon, setting his words to dance with music, for Israel’s 1982 celebration of the 25th anniversary of the retaking of Jerusalem.

== Awards ==
In 1996, Efrati was awarded the Israel Prize, for stage arts - dance.

== See also ==
- List of Israel Prize recipients
- Dance in Israel
