= Ganim (surname) =

Ganim is a surname. Notable people with the surname include:

- Joe Ganim (born 1959), American politician, attorney, and convicted felon
- John M. Ganim (born 1945), American writer
- Robert Ganim (born 1962), Papua New Guinean politician
- Sara Ganim (born 1987), American journalist
