= Albert S. Janin =

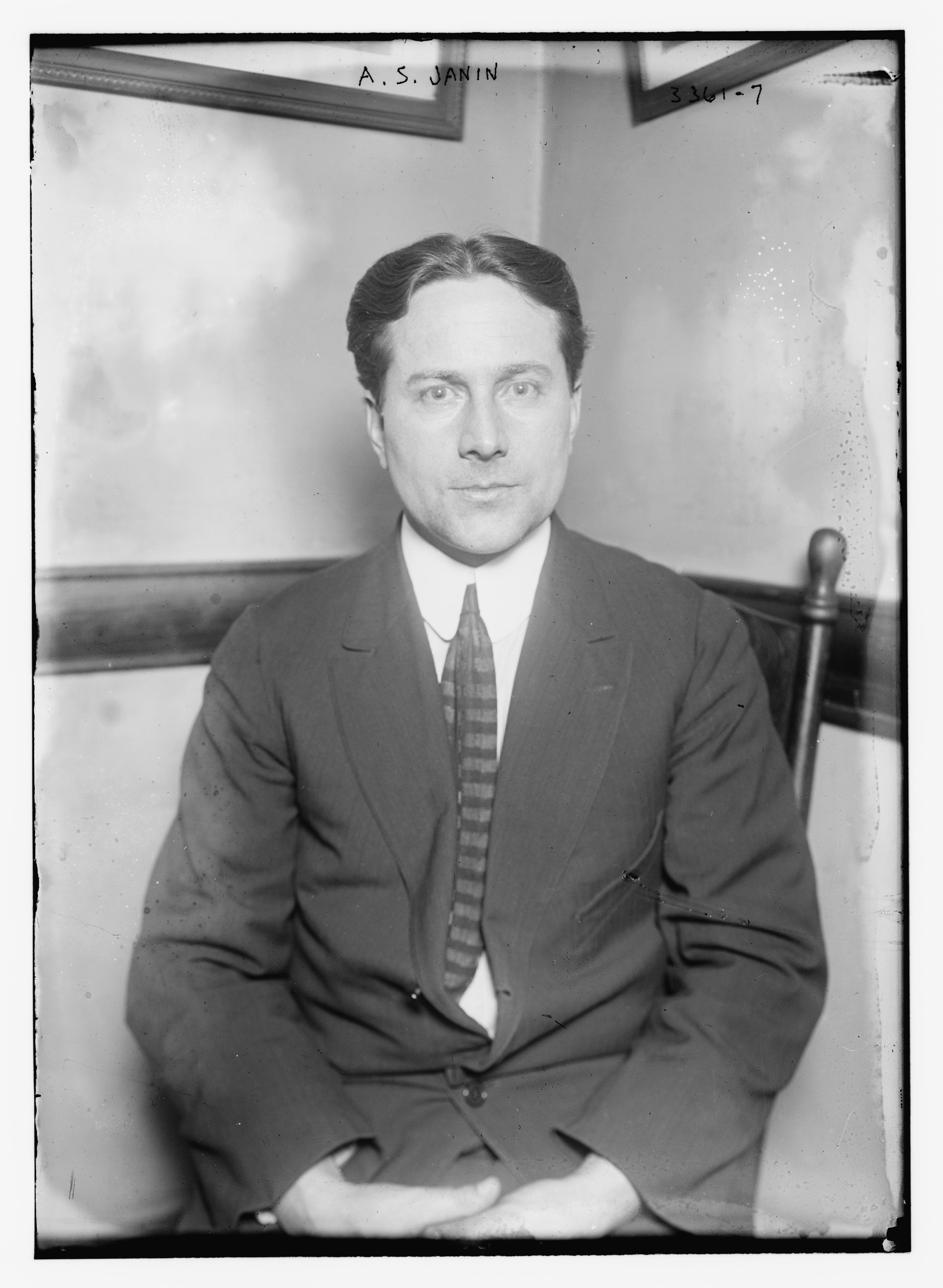

Albert Stanley Janin (1881–1931) was an American inventor of a hydro-airplane in 1907, independently of Glenn Curtiss. Even though Janin had had a prior patent, he lost in prolonged patent litigations to Curtiss on the grounds that Janin's designs did not disclose sufficient detail. Janin did win his claim first but then lost it on appeals. He was also credited with invention of the "inflammable [flammable] bullet" used during that war, and a catapult used to launch planes from ships. During World War I, he donated many of his patents to the government, for which he was honored by President Woodrow Wilson.
