= Yitzhak Yamin =

Iraqi-born Israeli painter and sculptor (1938–2020)

- יצחק ימין
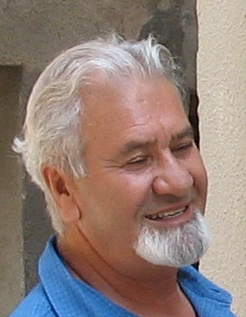
- Yitzhak Yamin
- Born: 1938; Iraq
- Died: 21 March 2020 (aged 81–82); Israel
- Education: Bezalel Academy of Arts and Design, Jerusalem
- Occupations: Painter; Sculptor; Art teacher
- Notable work: Holy Jerusalem carpet (part of the Recanati collection); Statue in memory of the fight over the Castel Hill; Memorandum room for veterans of Sayeret Haruv

Yitzhak Yamin (Hebrew: יצחק ימין; born 1938 – 21 March 2020) was an Iraqi-born Israeli painter and sculptor.

== Biography ==
Yitzhak Yamin was born in Iraq. In 1951, he immigrated to Israel and lived with his parents and eleven brothers and sisters in a ma'abara transit camp near Jerusalem. At the age of sixteen, Yamin left home and dedicated himself to art. In 1961 he graduated from the Bezalel Academy of Arts and Design in Jerusalem.

In the sixties Yamin won the Sharett Foundation scholarship for young artists, and studied under the Viennese artist Ernst Fuchs.

== Artistic style ==
Yamin's art utilizes a variety of painting techniques, such as sketch, watercolor painting, tempera paintings and oil on canvas. Beside being a painter Yamin also practices in plastic art, creating sculptures made of bronze, wood, marble, iron and stone. Yamin painted portraits of many well-known figures such as Rabbi Ovadia Yosef, prime minister Menachem Begin, and Egyptian president Anwar Al Sadat. Yamin had many solo exhibitions and participated in group shows. His paintings and sculptures are displayed in many private collections, public collections and galleries in Israel and abroad.

The “Holy Jerusalem” carpet designed by him is part of the Recanati collection in the Discount Bank in Tel-Aviv. In 1980 he designed and built a statue in memory of the fight over the Castel Hill. At the beginning of the nineties, he was invited to design a memorandum room for the veterans of the patrol unit “Sayeret Haruv” in the Jordan Valley.

Yizhak Yamin taught art in elementary schools and high schools. In 1970 he opened his own private school.

== See also ==
- Visual arts in Israel
