= Cheikh Mwijo =

Moroccan singer (1937–2020)

Background information
- Born: Moshe Attias; 1937; Meknes, Morocco
- Died: 2 May 2020 (aged 82–83) Kiryat Ata, Israel
- Genres: Malhun and popular songs
- Occupations: Singer, musician

Cheikh Mwijo (Arabic: الشيخ مويجو), born Moshe Attias in Meknes in 1937 and died on 2 May 2020 in Kiryat Ata, was a Moroccan musician and songwriter. He was one of the icons of Moroccan Jewish music.

== Biography ==
Born in 1937 in Meknes, Cheikh Mwijo comes from a line of singers and composers. His father Yaakov Attias was a percussionist and used to play in the Mâalem Ben Haroush orchestra.

Cheikh Mwijo began his musical career singing at the age of 25 by performing popular and Malhun songs.

Following the departure of Ben Haroush to Israel, Mwijo joined him in 1962. Aged then 35, he began a new musical career in Haifa by singing and playing the mandolin before switching to the North African violin which is played at the vertical. During his rich career, Mwijo remained closely linked to his original community and his main source of income was his concerts at weddings and events celebrated by the Moroccan Jewish community.

Cheikh Mwijo has a rich repertoire of over 500 songs and recorded more than 100 albums covering different genres such as chgouri, Malhun, Chaabi. Besides his humorous songs like "Tanjiya" and "A labnat", Mwijo also sang for peace and coexistence between Jews and Muslims as in his song "Ibrahim Al-Khalil" in which he explains that Abraham is a common ancestor of the two communities and that Ishmael and Isaac have been created by the same god.
