= Moshe Brawer =

Israeli geographer (1919–2020)

- משה ברוור
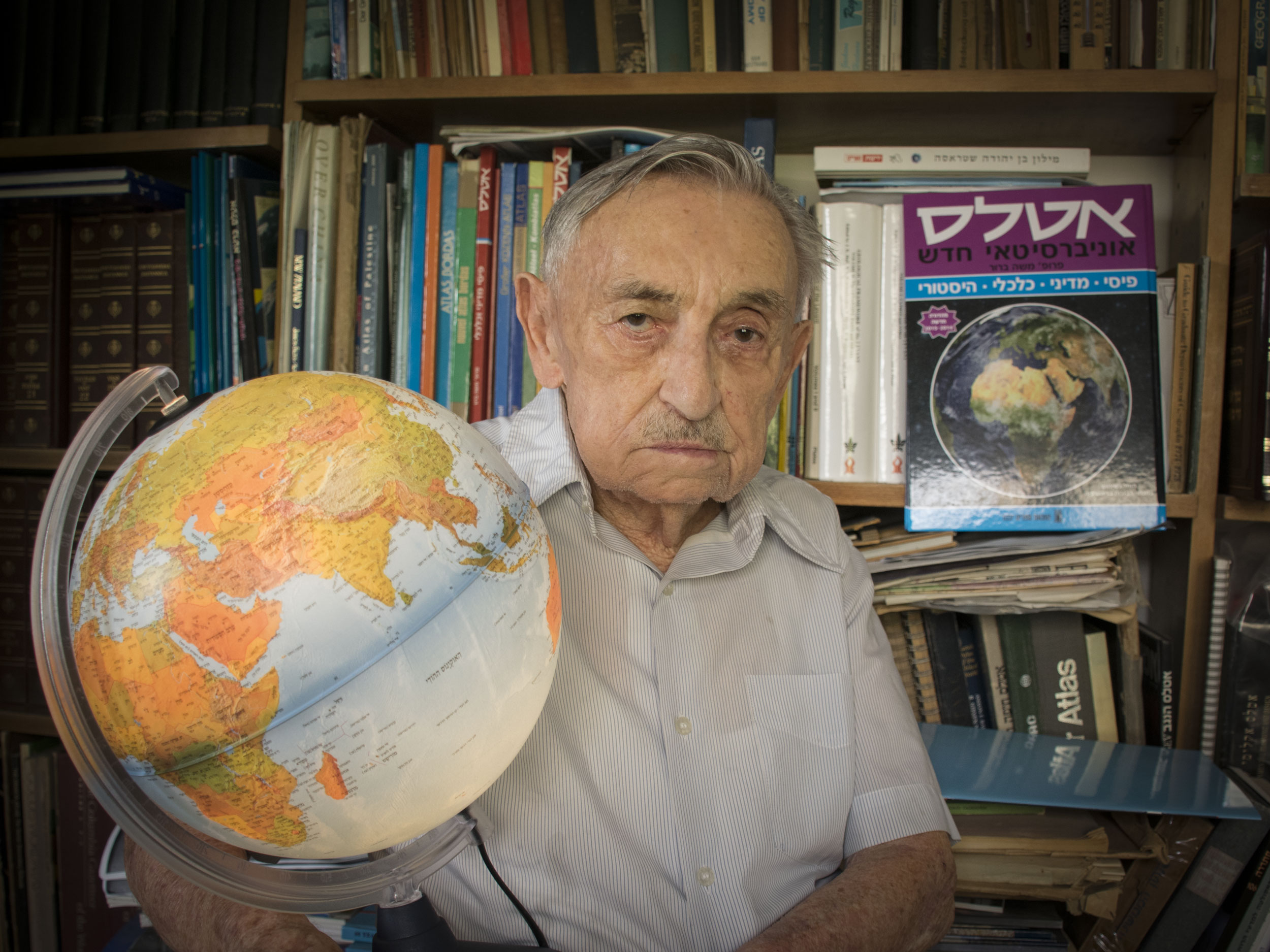
- Moshe Brawer
- Born: November 3, 1919; Vienna, Austria
- Died: 28 December 2020 (aged 101)
- Known for: The Atlas of the World
- Awards: Israel Prize (2002)

Academic background
- Education: Hebrew University of Jerusalem, University of London

Moshe Brawer (Hebrew: משה ברוור; 3 November 1919 – 28 December 2020) was an Israeli geographer. In 2002, he won the Israel Prize in geography. Brawer was the author of The Atlas of the World, an Israeli textbook published in 67 editions. He also compiled 20 other atlases in different languages.

== Biography ==
Moshe Brawer was born in Vienna, Austria. His grandfather was Rabbi Meir Meirson, one of the leaders of the Vienna Jewish community. His father was Abraham Jacob Brawer, a geographer and historian. His mother Sarah taught French in public schools. The family moved to Jerusalem in 1920, when Brawer was a year old.

Brawer studied mathematics at the Hebrew University of Jerusalem, and obtained a PhD in geography from the University of London. His thesis was on the boundaries of Palestine.

Brawer was married to Rina Arison, sister of Ted Arison, who has a controlling interest in Bank Hapoalim.

== Awards and recognition ==
In 2002, Brawer was awarded the Israel Prize for his contributions to the Geography of Israel.
