= Israeli Bedouin =

Ethnic group

Israeli Bedouin (Note: Hebrew: בדואים ישראלים, romanized: bedu'im yisralim. Arabic: البَدو الإسرَّائيليين, romanized: albadu al'iisrayiyliiyin.) are Muslim Arab citizens of Israel who are members of Bedouin tribes. The main groups are the Galilee Bedouin in the north and the Negev Bedouin in the south. As they live within the historical region of Palestine, they may be considered a subset of the Palestinian Bedouin.

== Populations ==
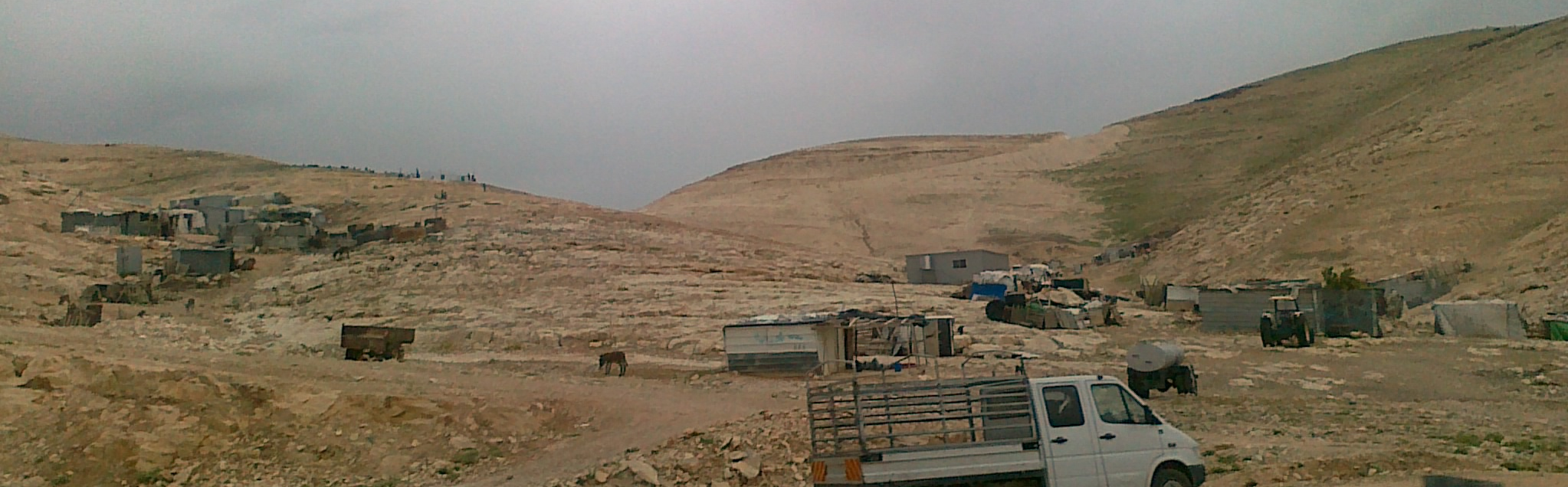
Bedouin encampment in the Negev Desert

Prior to the 1948 Israeli Declaration of Independence, an estimated 65,000–90,000 Bedouins lived in the Negev desert. According to Encyclopedia Judaica, 15,000 Bedouin remained in the Negev after 1948; other sources put the number as low as 11,000. Another source states that in 1999 110,000 Bedouins lived in the Negev, 50,000 in the Galilee and 10,000 in the central region of Israel. All of the Bedouins residing in Israel were granted Israeli citizenship in 1954.

As of 2020, there are 210,000 Bedouins in Israel: 150,000 in the Negev, 50,000 in Galilee and the Jezreel Valley, and 10,000 in the central region of Israel.

Galilee Bedouins have been living in the northern part of Israel for four centuries. Today, they live in 28 settlements in the north. They also live in mixed villages with other non-Bedouin Arabs.

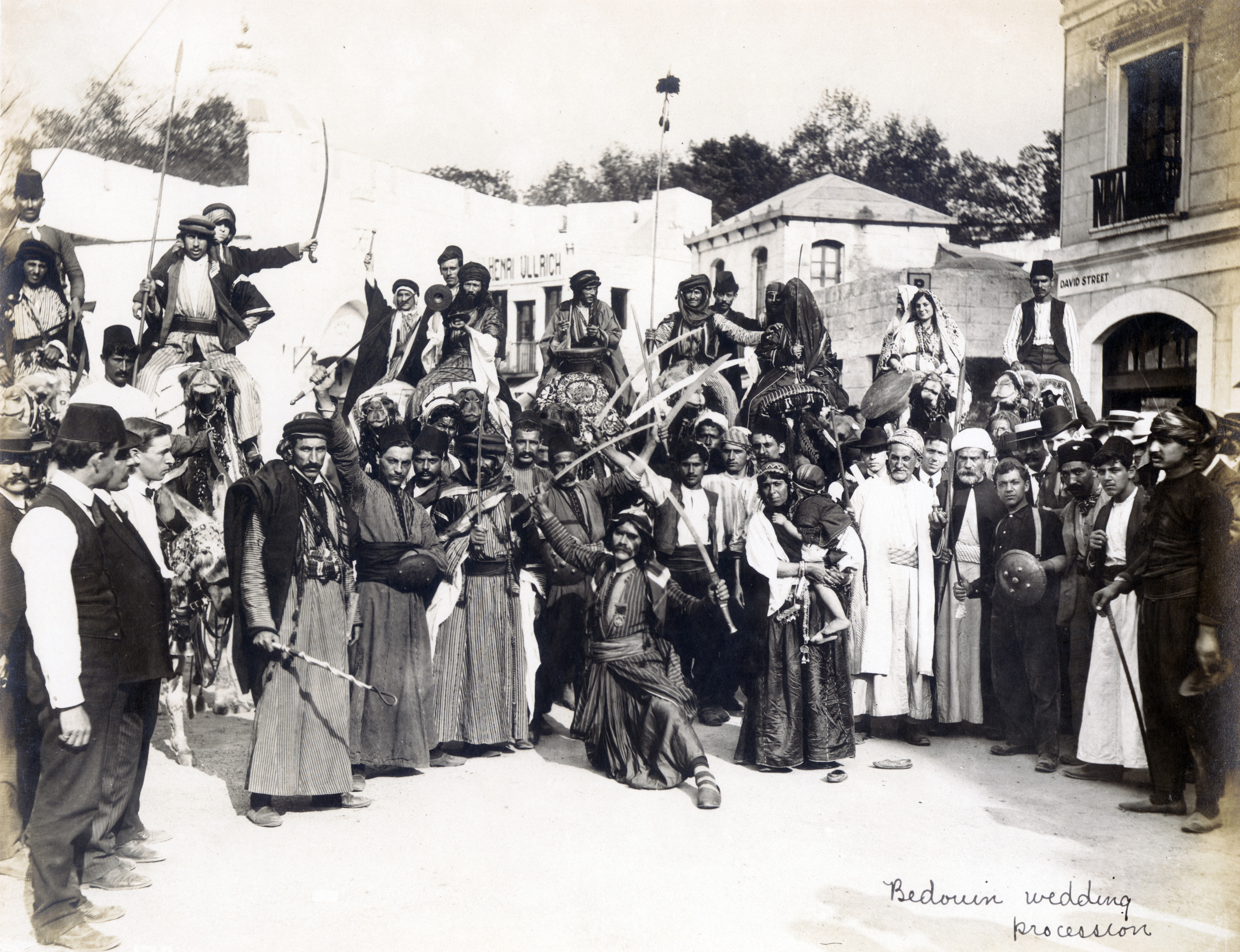
Bedouin wedding procession in the Jerusalem section of the pike at the 1904 World's Fair.

Successive Israeli administrations tried to demolish Bedouins villages in the Negev.

Between 1967 and 1989, Israel built seven legal townships in the north-east of the Negev, with Tel as-Sabi or Tel Sheva the first. The largest, city of Rahat, has a population of over 58,700 (as of December 2013); as such it is the largest Bedouin settlement in the world. Another well-known township out of the seven of them that the Israeli government built, is Hura. According to the Israel Land Administration (2007), some 60 per cent of the Negev Bedouin live in urban areas. The rest live in so-called unrecognized villages, which are not officially recognized by the state due to general planning issues and other political reasons. Despite these communities often predating the state of Israel, many are considered to be located in areas deemed unsuitable by the Israeli government, including military fire zones, natural reserves, landfills, etc.

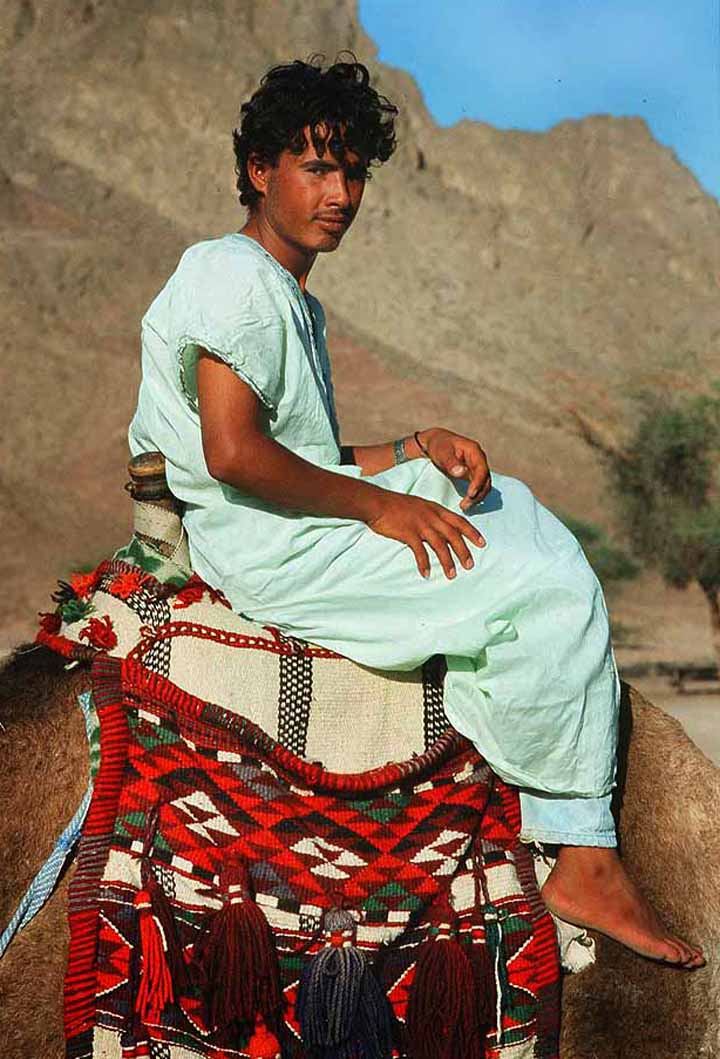
A Negev Bedouin man.

On 29 September 2003, Israeli government adapted a new "Abu Basma Plan" (Resolution 881), according to which a new regional council was formed, unifying a number of unrecognized Bedouin settlements—Abu Basma Regional Council. This resolution also regarded the need to establish seven new Bedouin settlements in the Negev, literally meaning the official recognition of unrecognized settlements, providing them with a municipal status and consequently with all the basic services and infrastructure. The council was established by the Interior Ministry on 28 January 2004. Israel is currently building or enlarging some 13 towns and cities in the Negev. According to the general planning, all of them will be fully equipped with the relevant infrastructure: schools, medical clinics, postal offices, etc. and they also will have electricity, running water and waste control. Several new industrial zones meant to fight unemployment are planned, some are already being constructed, like Idan HaNegev in the suburbs of Rahat. It will have a hospital and a new campus inside. The Bedouins of Israel receive free education and medical services from the state. They are allotted child cash benefits, which has contributed to the high birth rate among the Bedouin of 5% per year.

About 1,600 Bedouin serve as volunteers in the Israel Defense Forces, many as trackers in the IDF's elite tracking units.

== Human rights ==
In September 2011, the Israeli government approved a five-year economic development plan called the Prawer plan. One of its implications is a relocation of some 30.000-40.000 Negev Bedouin from areas not recognized by the government to government-approved townships. In a 2012 resolution the European Parliament called for the withdrawal of the Prawer plan and respect for the rights of the Bedouin people. In September 2014, Yair Shamir, who heads the Israeli government's ministerial committee on Bedouin resettlement arrangements, stated that the government was examining ways to lower the birthrate of the Bedouin community in order to improve its standard of living. Shamir claimed that without intervention, the Bedouin population could exceed half a million by 2035.

In May 2015, the United Nations Office for the Coordination of Humanitarian Affairs and the United Nations Relief and Works Agency for Palestine Refugees have combined forces. Both organizations called on Israel to stop its plans to relocate Bedouin communities currently living in the West Bank to land outside of Jerusalem for better access to infrastructure, health, and education. Officials stated that a "forcible transfer" of over 7000 Bedouin people would "destroy their culture and livelihoods."

== History ==
The Bedouin who remained in the Negev after the foundation of Israel belonged to the Tiaha confederation as well as some smaller groups such as the 'Azazme and the Jahalin. After 1948, some Negev Bedouins were displaced. The Jahalin tribe, for instance, lived in the Tel Arad region of the Negev prior to the 1950s. In the early 1950s, the Jahalin were among the tribes that, according to Emanuel Marx, "moved or were removed by the military government". They ended up in the so-called E1 area East of Jerusalem.

Famously, Bedouin shepherds were the first to discover the Dead Sea Scrolls, a collection of Jewish texts from antiquity, in the Judean caves of Qumran in 1946. Of great religious, cultural, historical and linguistic significance, 972 texts were found over the following decade, many of which were discovered by Bedouins.

== See also ==
- Palestinian Bedouin
- Jahalin Bedouin
- Hanajira
- Tarabin Bedouin
- Ta'amreh
