= Ein Ganim =

Neighborhood of Petah Tikva, Israel

Coordinates: 32.0851°N 34.8963°E

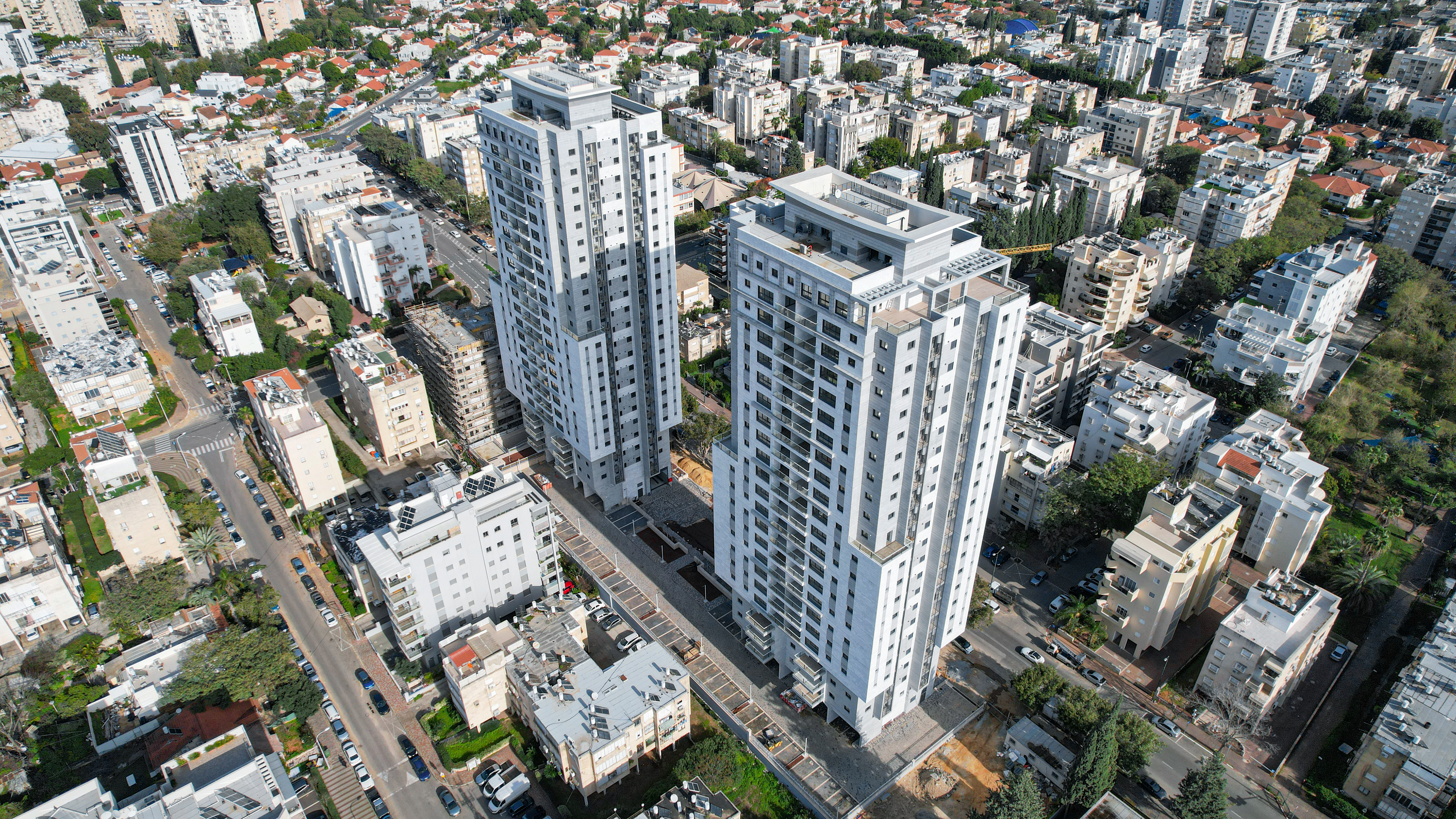
Ein Ganim, 2022

Ein Ganim (Hebrew: עין גנים) was the first moshav po'alim ("workers' moshav") in Israel.

The moshav was established in 1908 near Petah Tikva by members of the Second Aliyah and was named after the Levitical city of Ein Ganim, mentioned in the book of Joshua 21:29. The moshav poalim was an attempt to combine farming and urban labor (garden city movement). In addition to working in the city, families received land for tending small kitchen gardens. The moshav poalim differed in approach from the moshav ovdim ("laborers' moshav"): it was not based on collective ideology or settling national land.

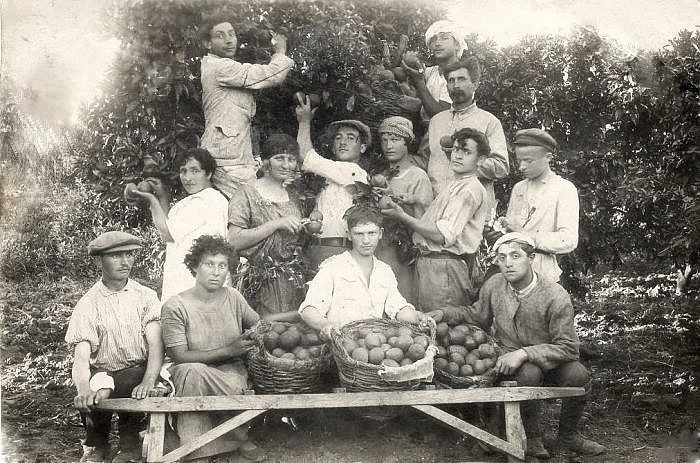
Citrus harvest at Ein Ganim, 1923

According to the 1931 census Ein Ganim had a population of 335 Jews, in 77 houses.

In 1939, Ein Ganim officially became a neighborhood of Petah Tikva.

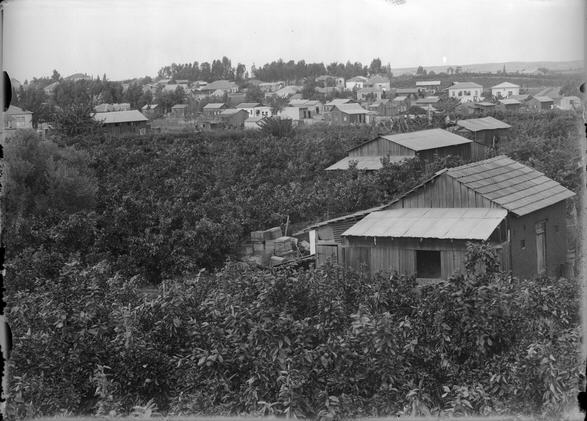
Ein Ganim 1928

== Notable residents ==
- General Moshe Peled was born here
