= Beersheba =

City in Israel

Coordinates: 31°15′08″N 34°47′12″E

Beersheba בְּאֵר שֶׁבַע (Hebrew) بئر السبع (Arabic)
- City
- Be'er Sheva

Hebrew transcription(s)
  - Also spelled: Be'er-Sheva (official); Beer Sheva (unofficial)
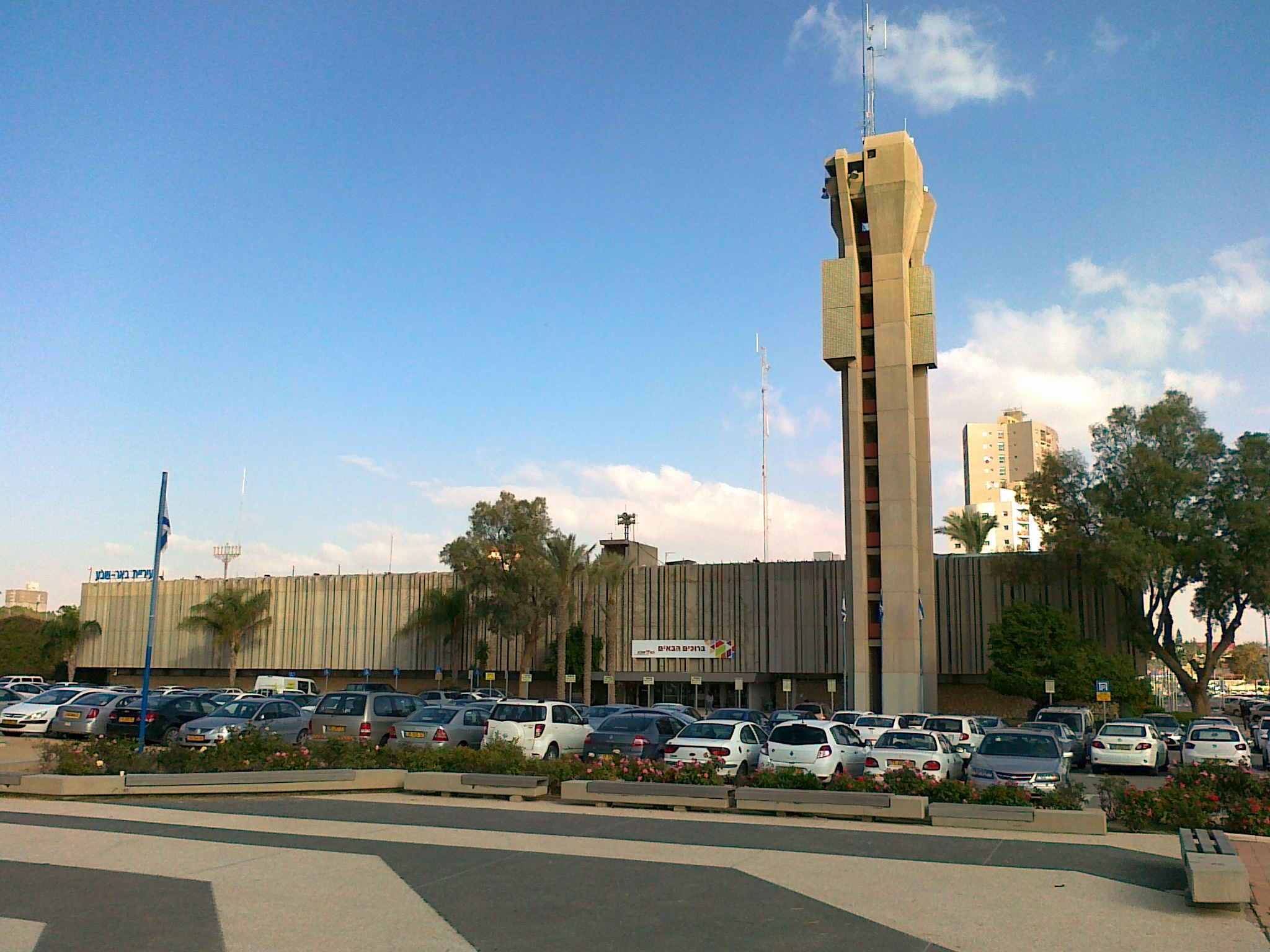
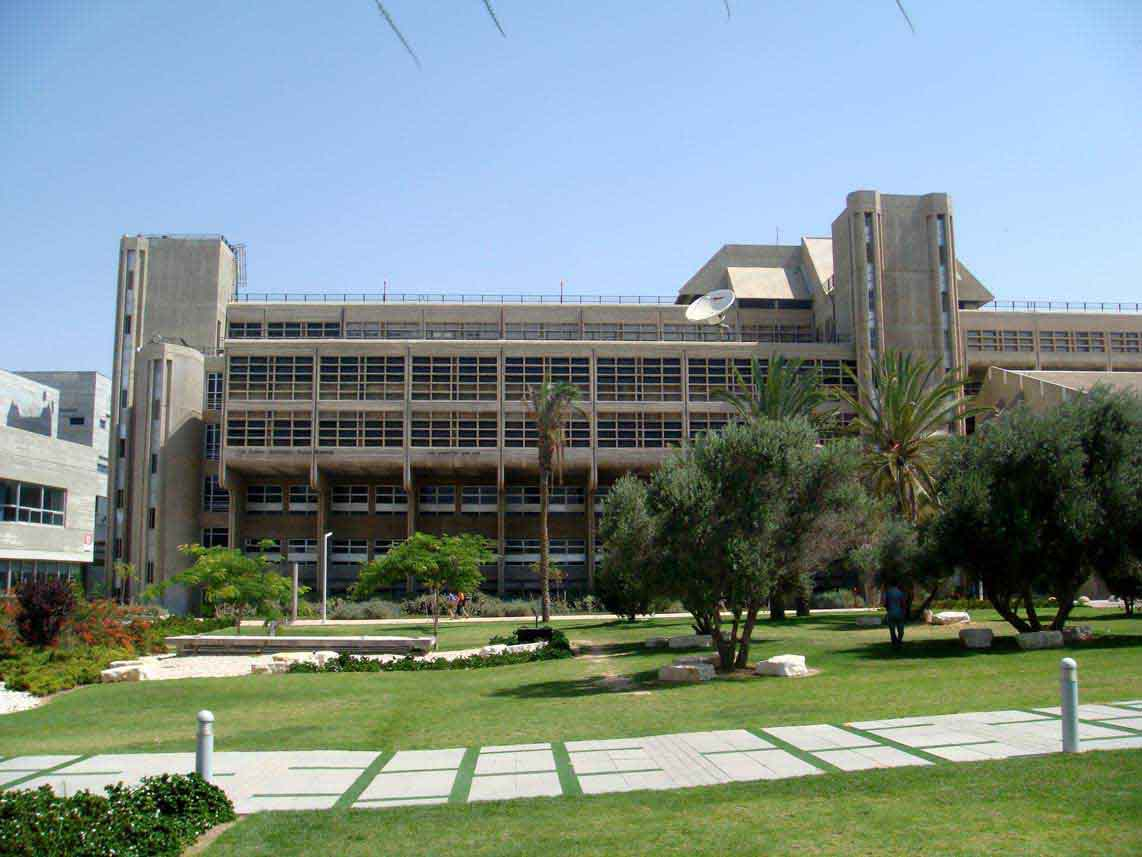
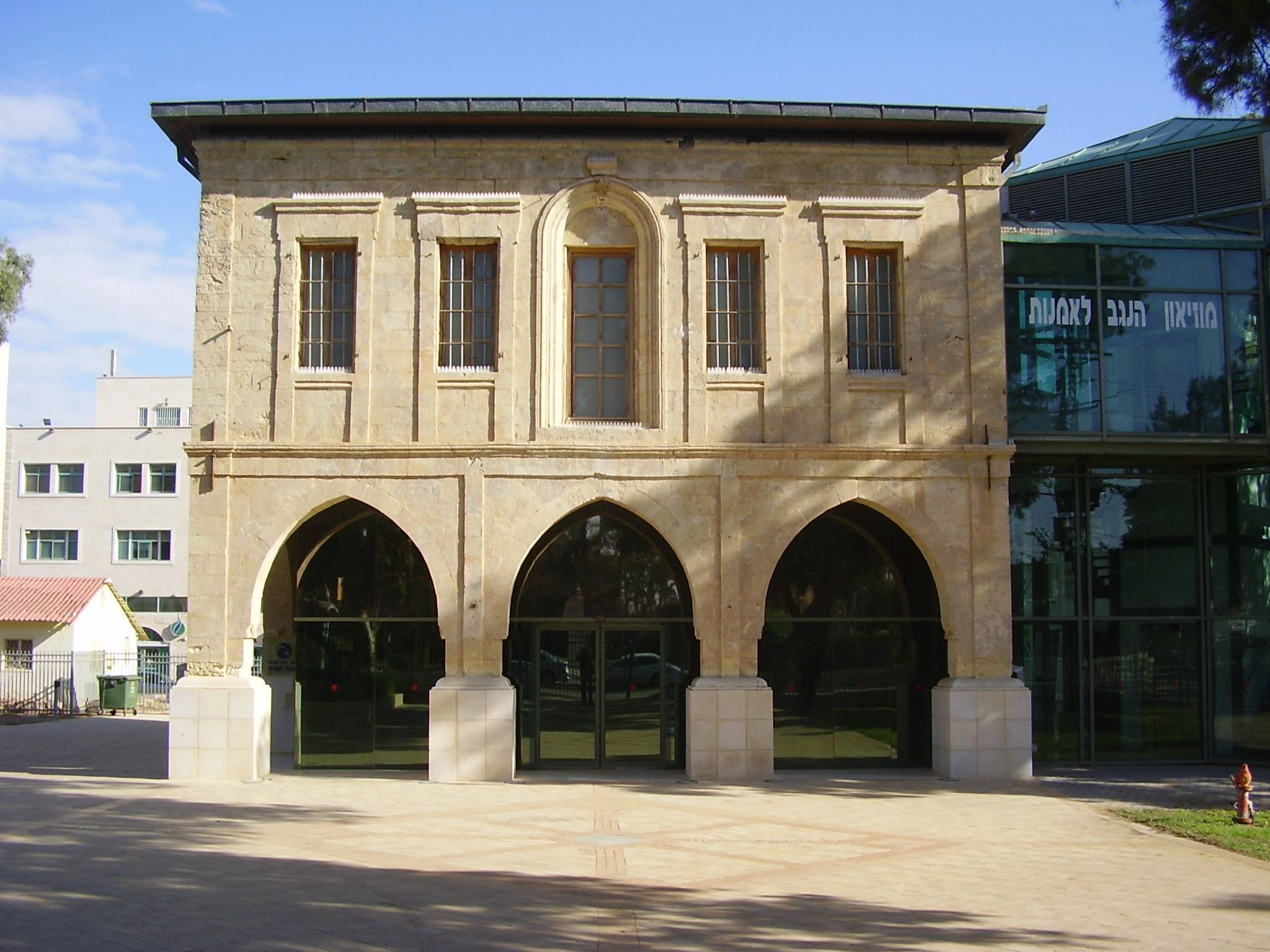
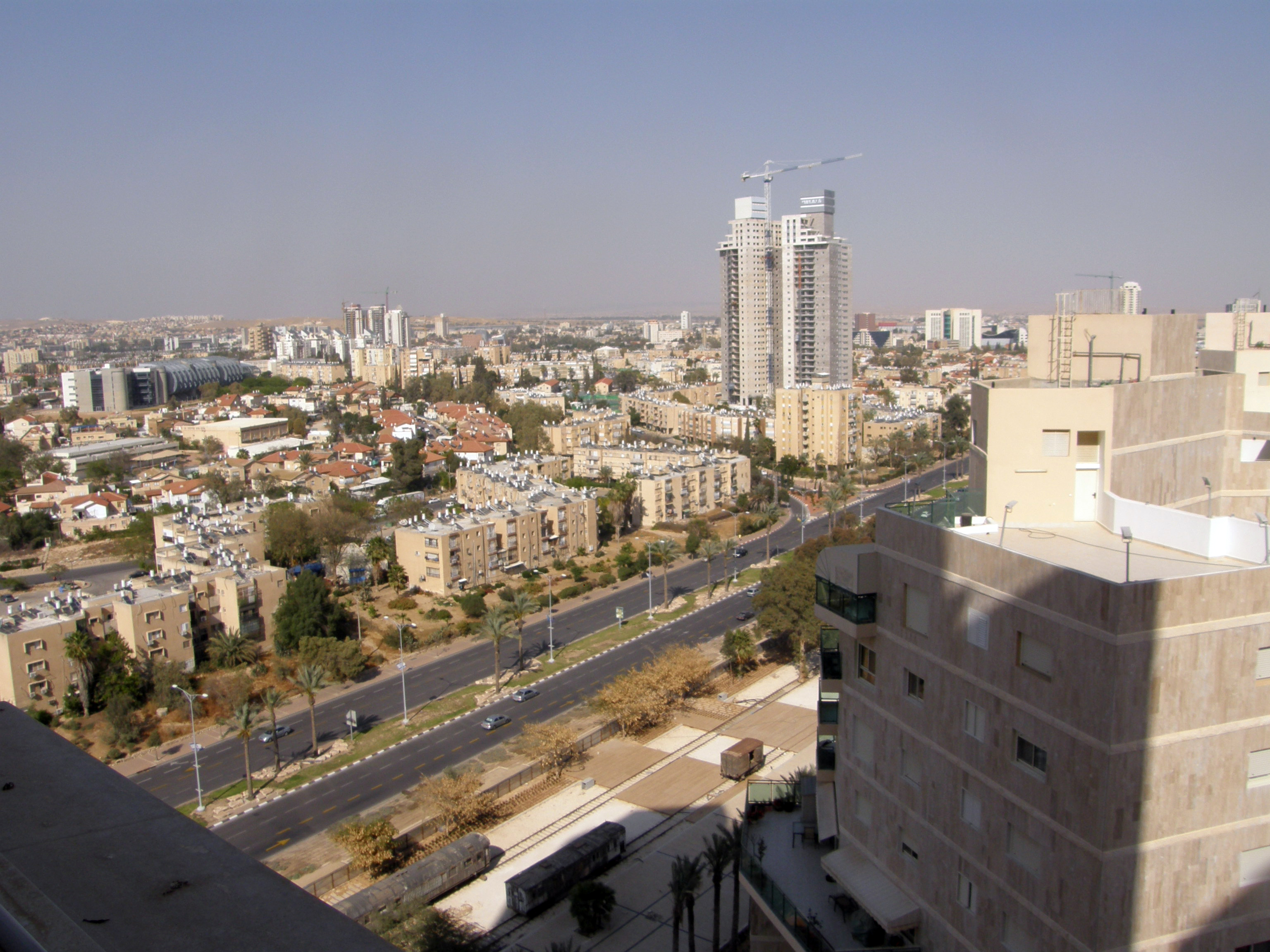
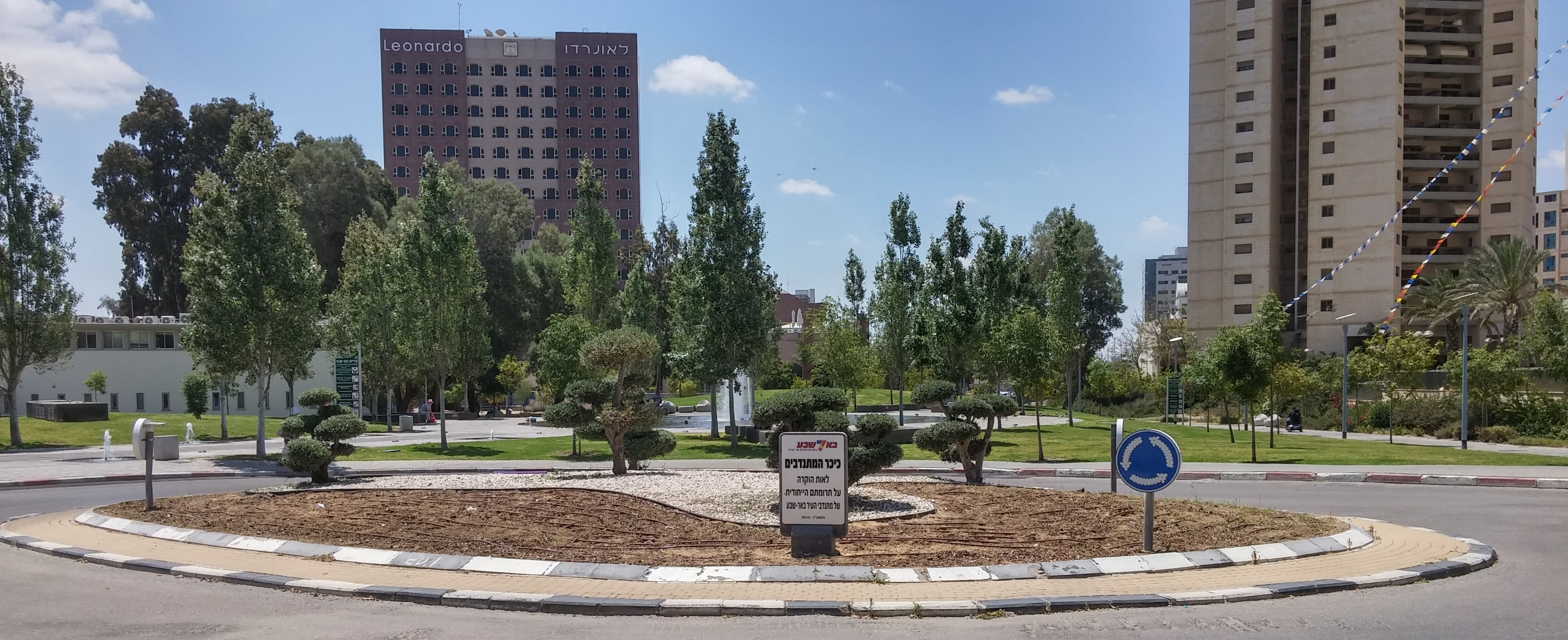
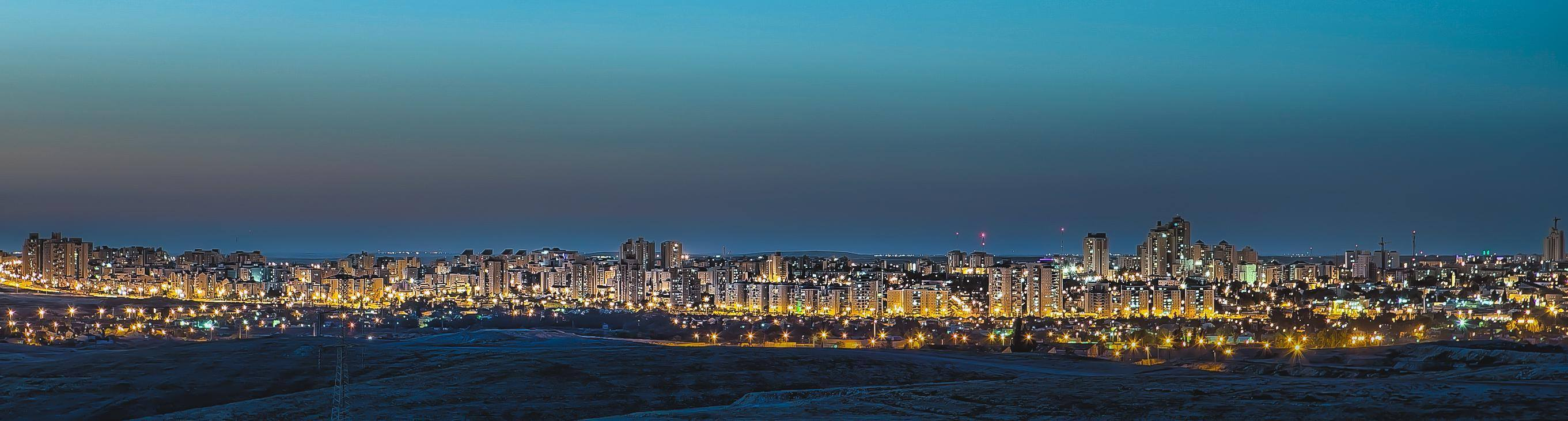
- From Upper left: Beersheba City Hall, Ben-Gurion University of the Negev, Negev Museum of Art, view of downtown, Volunteers square, Beersheba at night

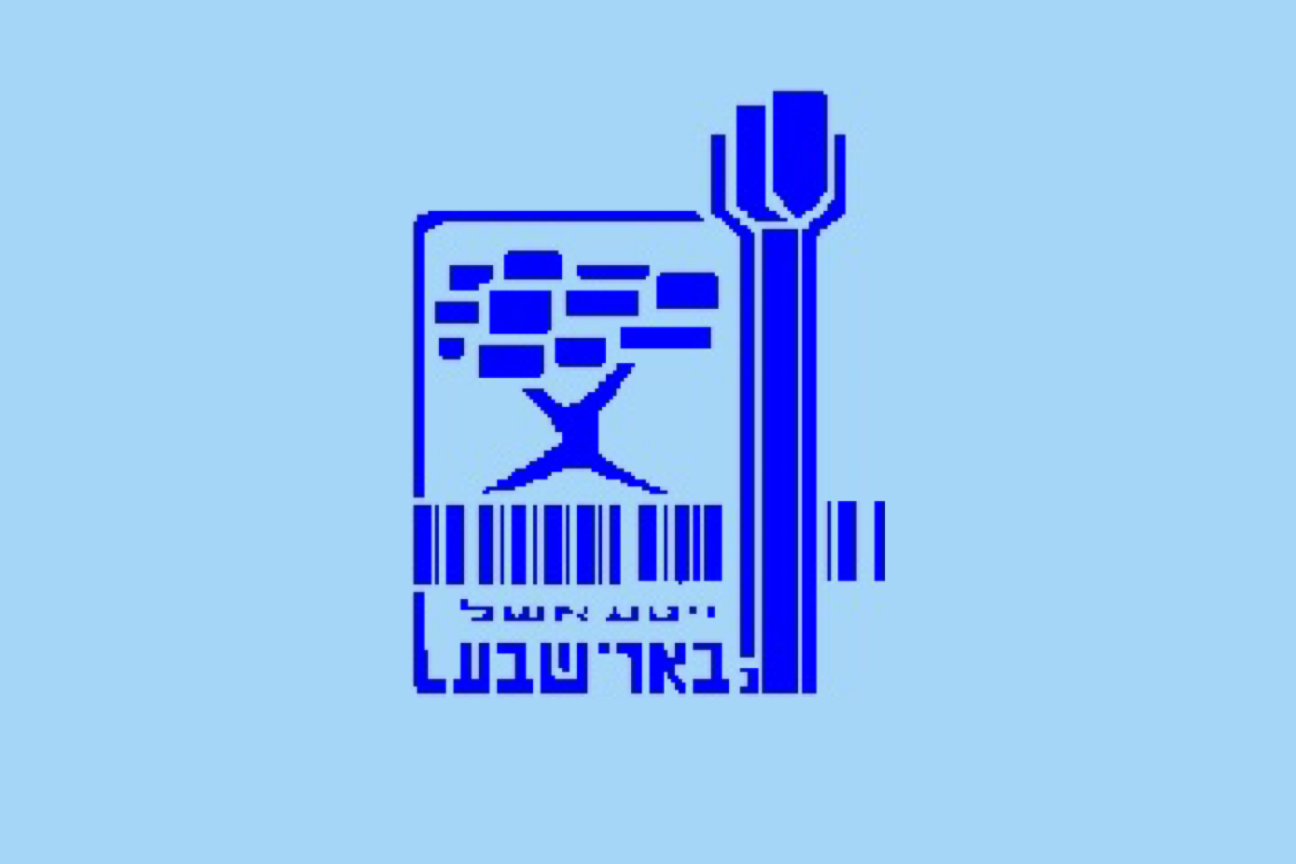
- Flag Coat of arms
- Interactive map of Beersheba
- Location within Northern Negev region of Israel Location within Israel
- Country: Israel
- District: Southern
- Subdistrict: Beersheba
- Natural Region: Be'er Sheva
- Established: 4000 BC (Tel Be'er Sheva); 1900 (new city)

Government
  - Type: Mayor–council
  - Body: Municipality of Beersheba
  - Mayor: Ruvik Danilovich

Area
  - Total: 117,500 dunams (117.5 km^{2}; 45.4 sq mi)
- Elevation: 260 m (850 ft)

Population (2024)
  - Total: 223,587
  - Density: 1,903/km^{2} (4,928/sq mi)

Ethnicity
  - Jews and others: 96.9%
  - Arabs: 3.1%
- Time zone: UTC+2 (IST)
  - Summer (DST): UTC+3 (IDT)
- Name meaning: Well of the Oath^{(see also)}
- Website: beer-sheva.muni.il

Beersheba (/bɪərˈʃiːbə/ beer-SHEE-bə), officially Be'er-Sheva (/bɛərˈʃɛvə/ bair-SHEV-ə), (Note: Usually spelled Beer Sheva; Hebrew: בְּאֵר שֶׁבַע, romanized: Bəʾēr Šeḇaʿ, IPA: [ˈbe(ʔ)eʁ ˈʃeva(ʕ)]; Arabic: بئر السبع, romanized: Biʾr as-Sabʿ, IPA: [biʔr‿asˈsabʕ]; lit. 'Well of the Oath' or 'Well of the Seven'.) is the largest city in the Negev desert of southern Israel. Often referred to as the "Capital of the Negev", it is the centre of the fourth-most populous metropolitan area in Israel, the eighth-most populous Israeli city with a population of 223,587, and the second-largest city in the area (after Jerusalem), with a total area of 117,500 dunams (117.5 square kilometres).

Human habitation near present-day Beersheba dates back to the fourth millennium BC. In the Bible, Beersheba marks the southern boundary of ancient Israel, as mentioned in the phrase "From Dan to Beersheba." Initially assigned to the Tribe of Judah, Beersheba was later reassigned to Simeon. During the monarchic era, it functioned as a royal city but eventually faced destruction at the hands of the Assyrians. The Biblical site of Beersheba is Tel Be'er Sheva, lying some 4 kilometres (2 1/2 miles) distant from the modern city, which was established at the start of the 20th century by the Ottomans. The city was captured by the British-led Australian Light Horse troops in the Battle of Beersheba during World War I.

The population of the town was completely changed in 1948–49 during the First Arab–Israeli War. Beersheba had been almost entirely Muslim, and the 1947 UN Partition Plan designated it to be part of the Arab state. It was occupied by the Egyptian army from May 1948 until October 1948 when it was captured by the Israel Defense Forces and part of the Arab population was expelled. Today, the metropolitan area is composed of approximately equal Jewish and Arab populations, with a large portion of the Jewish population made up of the descendants of Sephardi Jews and Mizrahi Jews who fled, relocated or were expelled from Arab countries after Israel's founding in 1948, as well as smaller communities of Bene Israel and Cochin Jews from India. Second and third waves of immigration have taken place since 1990, bringing Russian-speaking immigrants from the former Soviet Union as well as Beta Israel immigrants from Ethiopia. The Soviet immigrants have made the game of chess a major sport in Beersheba, and it is now Israel's national chess center, with more chess grandmasters per capita than any other city in the world.

Beersheba is home to Ben-Gurion University of the Negev. This city also serves as a center for Israel's high-tech and developing technology industry.

== Etymology ==
The Book of Genesis gives two etymologies for the name Be'er Sheba. Genesis 21:28-31 relates:

Then Abraham set seven ewes apart. And Abimelech said to Abraham, "What mean these seven ewes, which you have set apart? And [Abraham] said, "That you are to take these seven (sheba) ewes from me, to be for me a witness that I have dug this well (bǝ'er)." Therefore the name of that place was Be'er Sheba, for there the two of them had sworn (nishbǝ'u).

Genesis 26 relates:

And Isaac redug the wells which had been dug in the days of Abraham his father, and which the Philistines had sealed after the death of Abraham, and he used the same names as had his father ... And they arose in the morning, and they swore (wa-yishabǝ'u) each to his fellow, and Isaac sent them off, and they departed him in peace. On that same day, Isaac's men came to him to tell him of the well which they had dug, and they said to him, "We found water." And he called it Shib'a ("seven" normally, possibly "oath" or a proper noun); therefore the name of the city is Be'er Sheba to this day. (Note: "Shib'a" is spelled "Shibah" in many English translations.)

The original Hebrew name could therefore relate to the oath of Abraham and Abimelech ('well of the oath') or the seven ewes in that oath ('well of the seven'), as related in Genesis 21:31, and/or to the oath of Isaac and Abimelech in Genesis 26:33. Alternatively, Obadiah Sforno suggested that the well is called Seven because it was the seventh dug; the narrative of Genesis 26 includes three wells dug by Abraham which are reopened by Isaac (Esek, Sitnah, and Rehoboth), for a total of six, after which Isaac goes to Beersheba, the seventh well.

The double name of Shib'a and Beersheba is referenced again by the Masoretic Text in Joshua 19:2, usually translated "Beersheba or Sheba"; however the Septuagint reads "Beersheba and Samaa (Σαμαὰ)" which fits with MT 1 Chron. 4:28.

Abraham ibn Ezra and Samuel b. Meir suggest the two etymologies refer to two different cities.

During the Ottoman administration, the city was referred as بلدية بئرالسبع, "Belediyet Bi'r alsab'" (Palestinian Arabic meaning "Well of the Seven"), "Baladiyyat Bi'russab" (Modern Standard Arabic).

== Hebrew Bible ==
Beersheba is mainly dealt with in the Hebrew Bible in connection with the Patriarchs Abraham and Isaac, who both dug a well and close peace treaties with King Abimelech of Gerar at the site. Hence it receives its name twice, first after Abraham's dealings with Abimelech (Genesis 21:22–34), and again from Isaac who closes his own covenant with Abimelech of Gerar and whose servants also dig a well there (Genesis 26:23–33). The place is thus connected to two of the three wife–sister narratives in the Book of Genesis.

According to the Hebrew Bible, Beersheba was founded when Abraham and Abimelech settled their differences over a well of water and made a covenant (see Genesis 21:25–34). Abimelech's men had taken the well from Abraham after he had previously dug it so Abraham brought sheep and cattle to Abimelech to get the well back. He set aside seven lambs to swear that it was he that had dug the well and no one else. Abimelech conceded that the well belonged to Abraham and, according to this account, Beersheba means "Well of Seven" or "Well of the Oath".

Beersheba is further mentioned when Isaac built an altar in Beersheba (Genesis 26:23–33). Later, Jacob had his dream about a stairway to heaven after leaving Beersheba. (Genesis 28:10–15 and 46:1–7). Beersheba was the territory of the tribe of Simeon and Judah (Joshua 15:28 and 19:2). The sons of the prophet Samuel were judges in Beersheba (I Samuel 8:2). Saul, Israel's first king, built a fort there for his campaign against the Amalekites (I Samuel 14:48 and 15:2–9). The prophet Elijah took refuge in Beersheba when Jezebel ordered him killed (I Kings 19:3). The prophet Amos mentions the city in regard to idolatry (Amos 5:5 and 8:14). Following the Babylonian conquest and subsequent enslavement of many Israelites, the town was abandoned. After the Israelite slaves returned from Babylon, they resettled the town. According to the Hebrew Bible, Beersheba was the southernmost city of the territories settled by Israelites, hence the expression "from Dan to Beersheba", used to describe the whole kingdom.

Zibiah, the consort of King Ahaziah of Judah and the mother of King Jehoash of Judah, was from Beersheba.

== History ==
The city has been destroyed and rebuilt many times. Considered unimportant for centuries, Be'er Sheva regained notoriety under Byzantine rule (in the 4th–7th century), when it was a key point on the Limes Palestinae, a defense line built against the desert tribes; however, it fell to the Arabs in the 7th century and to the Turks in the 16th century.

It long remained a watering place and small trade centre for the nomadic Bedouin tribes of the Negev, despite Turkish efforts at town planning and development around 1900. Its capture in 1917 by the British Army opened the way for their conquest of Palestine and Syria. After being taken by Israeli troops in October 1948, Beersheba was rapidly settled by new immigrants and has since developed as the administrative, cultural, and industrial centre of the Negev. It is one of the largest cities in Israel outside of metropolitan Tel Aviv, Jerusalem, and Haifa.

=== Chalcolithic ===
Human settlement in the area dates from the Copper Age. The inhabitants lived in caves, crafting metal tools and raising cattle. Findings unearthed at Tel Be'er Sheva, an archaeological site east of modern-day Beersheba, suggest the region has been inhabited since the 4th millennium BC (between 5000 and 6,000 years ago).

=== Iron Age ===
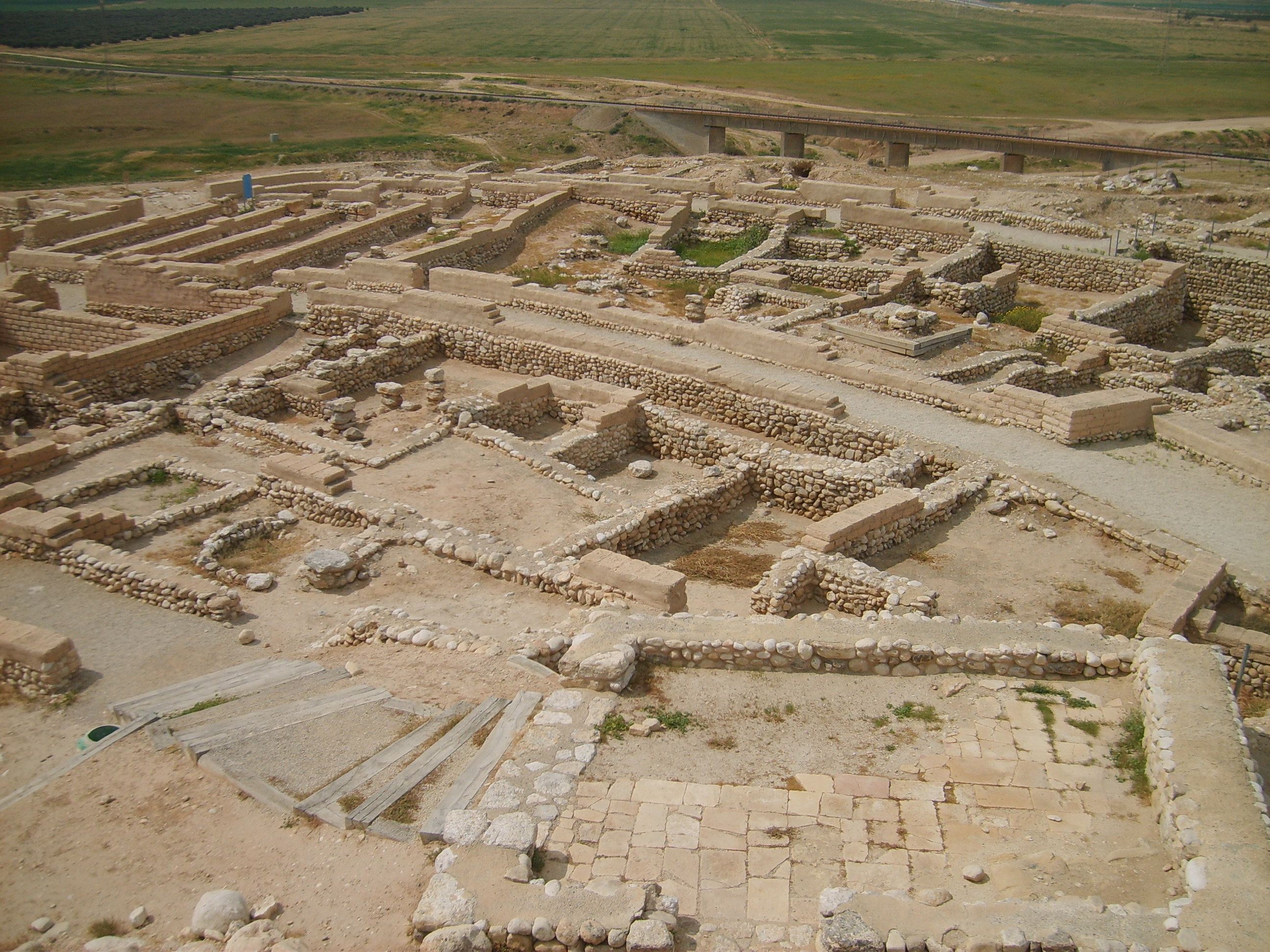
Tel Sheva archaeological site

Tel Be'er Sheva, an archaeological site containing the ruins of an ancient town believed to have been the Biblical Beersheba, lies a few kilometers east of the modern city. The town dates to the early Israelite period, around the 10th century BC. The site was possibly chosen due to the abundance of water, as evidenced by the numerous wells in the area. According to the Hebrew Bible, the wells were dug by Abraham and Isaac when they arrived there. The streets were laid out in a grid, with separate areas for administrative, commercial, military, and residential use. It is believed to have been the first planned settlement in the region, and is also noteworthy for its elaborate water system; in particular, a huge cistern carved out of the rock beneath the town.

=== Persian period ===
During the Persian rule 539 BC–c. 332 BC, Beersheba was at the south of Yehud Medinata autonomous province of the Persian Achaemenid Empire. During that era, the city was rebuilt and a citadel had been constructed. Archeological finds from between 359 and 338 BC have been made, finding pottery and an ostracon.

=== Hellenistic period ===
During the Hasmonean rule, the city was not attributed great importance as it was not mentioned when conquered from Edom or described in the Hasmonean wars.

=== Roman and Byzantine periods ===
Around 64-63 BC, the Roman general Gnaeus Pompeius Magnus made Beersheba, known as Birosaba, the southern part of the Judea province. During the Herodian period there was a small settlement in Beersheba. Remains of a Jewish village dating back to the 1st century AD were discovered in the Rakafot neighborhood in the north of the city.

In the following years, the town served as front-line defence against Nabatean attacks and was on the limes belt, which in this region is attributed to the time of Vespasian (1st century AD). The city become the centre of an eparchy around 268. During the Roman and Byzantine periods, the city developed significantly and the burial grounds on the outskirts of the city became residential areas. The inhabitants, which consisted of Nabataeans, Jews and other ethnicities, spoke primarily Greek and lived from olive oil production, viticulture, agricultural and other trades.

After the reforms of Diocletian, the town became part of the province of Palaestina Tertia and grew to an approximate size of 60 hectares during its peak in the 6th century. Beersheba was described in the Madaba Map and Eusebius of Caesarea as a large village with a Roman garrison. The camp was later identified in aerial photographs taken during the First World War and other structures associated with the camp, such as a bath house and dwellings, were found in later excavations.

During the Byzantine period, at least six churches were built there, one of which is the largest church to have been excavated in the Negev. Some of the churches were still in use until the Umayyad period but it remains uncertain whether they continued beyond the early eight century. Monasticism is also attested in historical documents and one structure has been identified as a monastery. Barsanuphius of Gaza corresponded with a certain monk of Beersheba, John, who might be identified with John the Prophet, who between 525 and 527 moved to the monastery of Seridus and together with Barsanuphius wrote over 850 letters on spiritual direction.

=== Early Muslim period ===
During the early Muslim period, some of the Byzantine buildings continued to be used, but there was a slow decline of the city, which was manifested in the demolition of the public buildings and their transformation into a source of raw material for secondary construction. In the second half of the 8th century, the city was apparently abandoned.

=== Mamluk period ===
In 1483, during the late Mamluk era, the pilgrim Felix Fabri noted Beersheba as a city. Fabri also noted that Beersheba marked the southern-most border of "the Holy Land".

=== Ottoman period ===
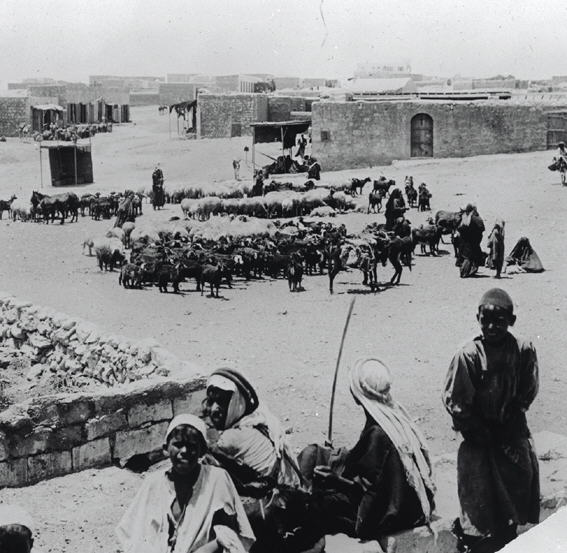
Beersheba in 1901

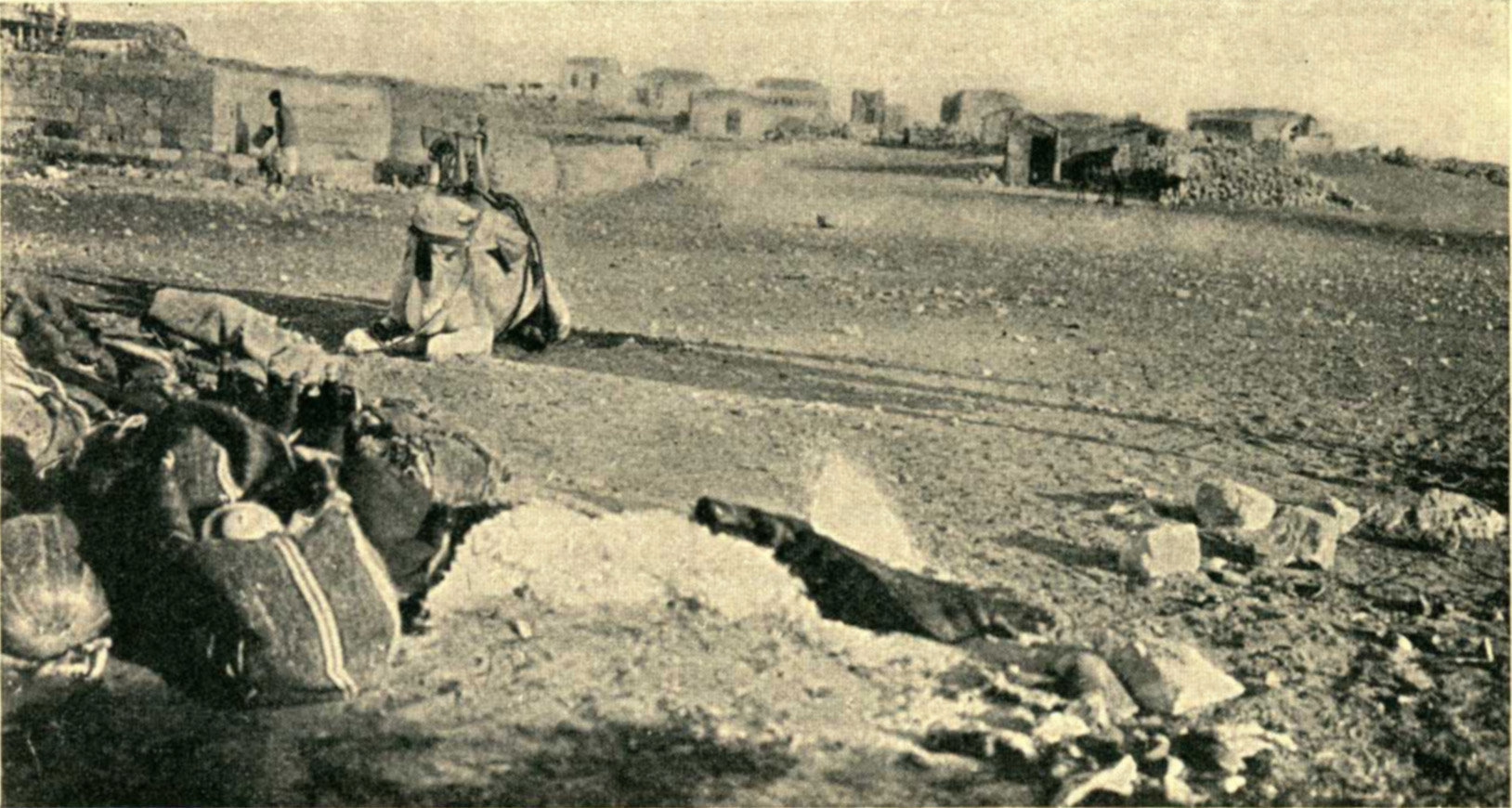
Beersheba from the south in 1902

The present-day city was built to serve as an administrative center by the Ottoman administration for the benefit of the Bedouin at the outset of the 20th century and was given the name of Bir al-Sabi (well of the seven). Until World War I, it was an overwhelmingly Muslim township with some 1,000 residents. Ben-David and Kressel have argued that the Bedouin traditional market was the cornerstone for the founding of Beersheba as capital of the Negev during this period, and Negev Bedouin. Anthropologist and educationalist Aref Abu-Rabia, who worked for the Israeli Ministry of Education and Culture, described it as "the first Bedouin city".

In June 1899, the Ottoman government ordered the creation of the Beersheba sub-district (kaza) of the district (mutasarrıflık) of Jerusalem, with Beersheba to be developed as its capital. Implementation was entrusted to a special bureau of the Ministry of the Interior. The British incorporation of Sinai into Egypt led to a need for the Ottomans to consolidate their hold on southern Palestine. There was also a desire to encourage the Bedouin to become sedentary, with a predicted increase of tranquility and tax revenue. The first governor (kaymakam), Isma'il Kamal Bey, lived in a tent lent by the local sheikh until the government house (Saraya) was built. Kamal was replaced by Muhammed Carullah Efendi in 1901, who in turn was replaced by Hamdi Bey in 1903. The governor in 1908 was promoted to 'adjoint' (mutassarrıf muavin) to the governor of the Jerusalem district, which placed him above the other sub-district governors.

A visitor to Beersheba in May 1900 found only a ruin, a two-storey stone khan, and several tents. By the start of 1901 there was a barracks with a small garrison as well as other buildings. The Austro-Hungarian-Czech orientalist Alois Musil noted in August 1902:

Bir es-Seba grows from day to day; This year, instead of the tents, we found stately houses along a beautiful road from the Sarayah to the bed of the wadi. In the government building a garden has been laid out, and all sorts of trees have been planted which are sure to prosper, for the few shrubs planted two years ago by the steam mill at the south-east end of the road have grown considerably. The lively construction activity is also causing a lively exploitation of the ruins.

By 1907, there was a large village, military post, a residence for the kaymakam and a large mosque. The population increased from 300 to 800 between 1902 and 1911, and by 1914 there were 1,000 people living in 200 houses.

A plan for the town in the form of a grid was developed by a Swiss and a German architect and two others. The grid pattern can be seen today in Beersheba's Old City. Most of the residents at the time were Arabs from Hebron and the Gaza area, although Jews also began settling in the city. Many Bedouin abandoned their nomadic lives and built homes in Beersheba.

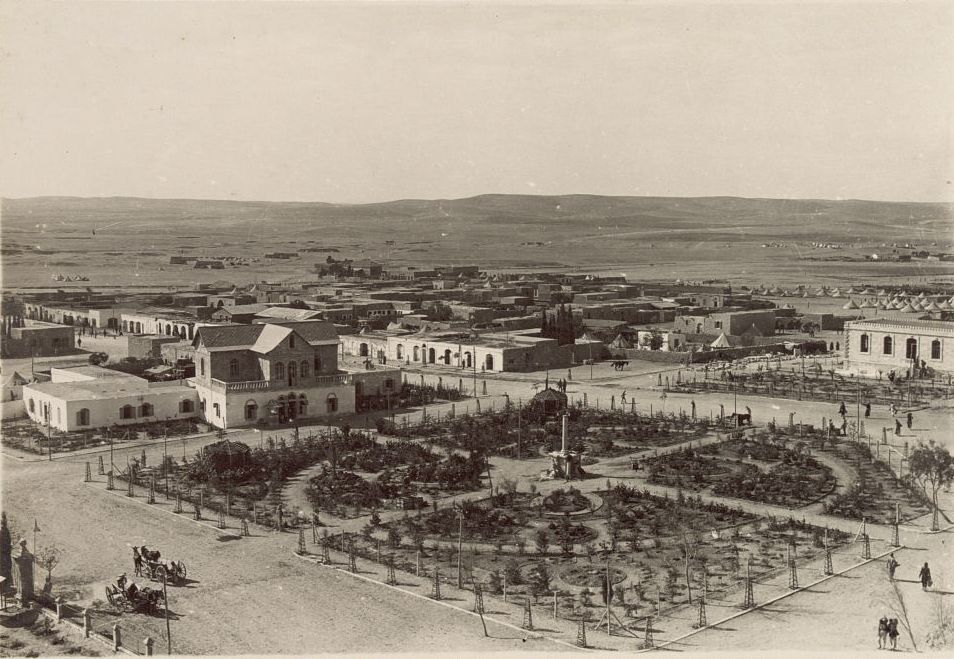
Beersheba, 1917

The Beersheba bazaar, Bedouins bargaining with vendors, between 1898 and 1946

=== First World War and British Mandate ===
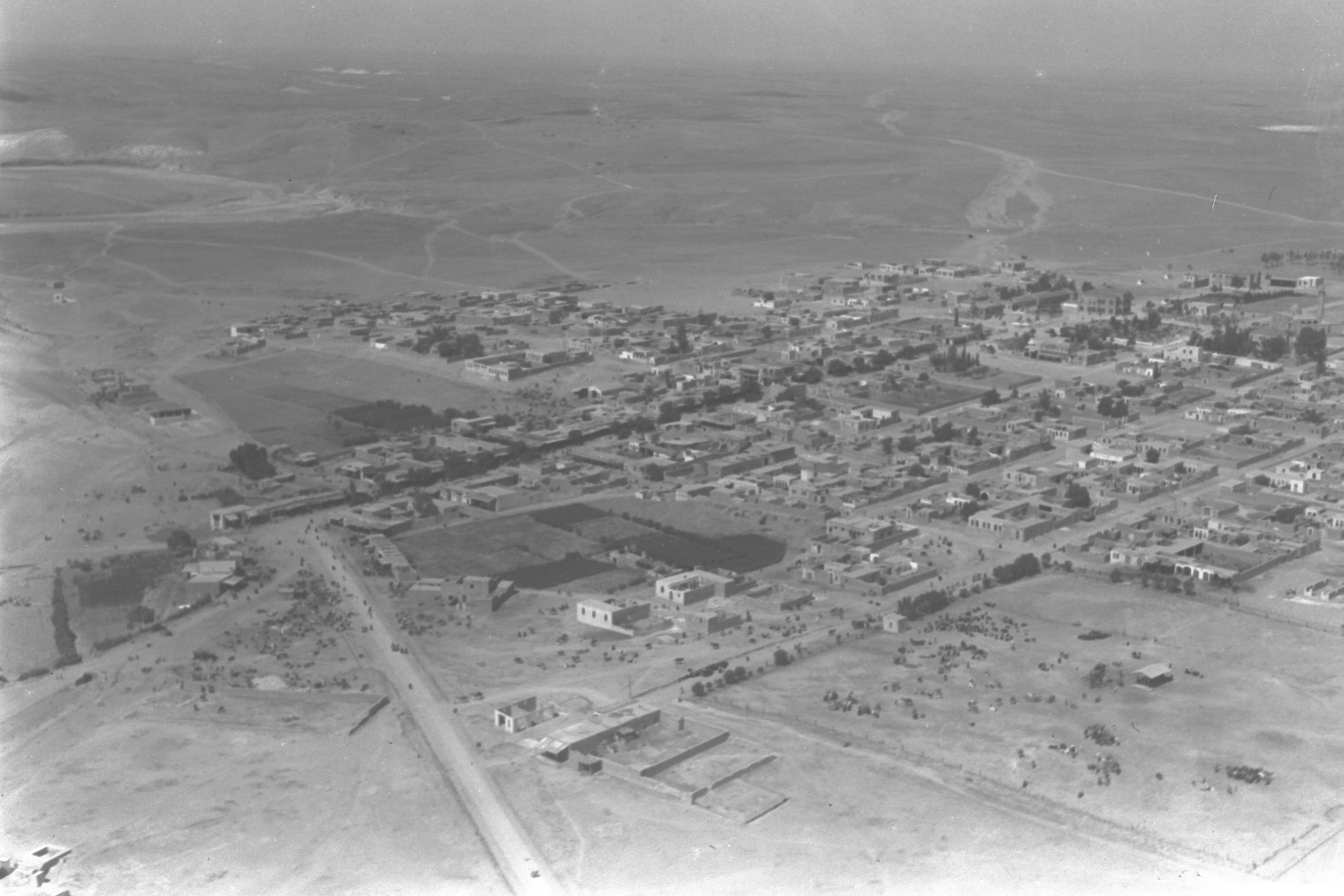
Beersheba 1938

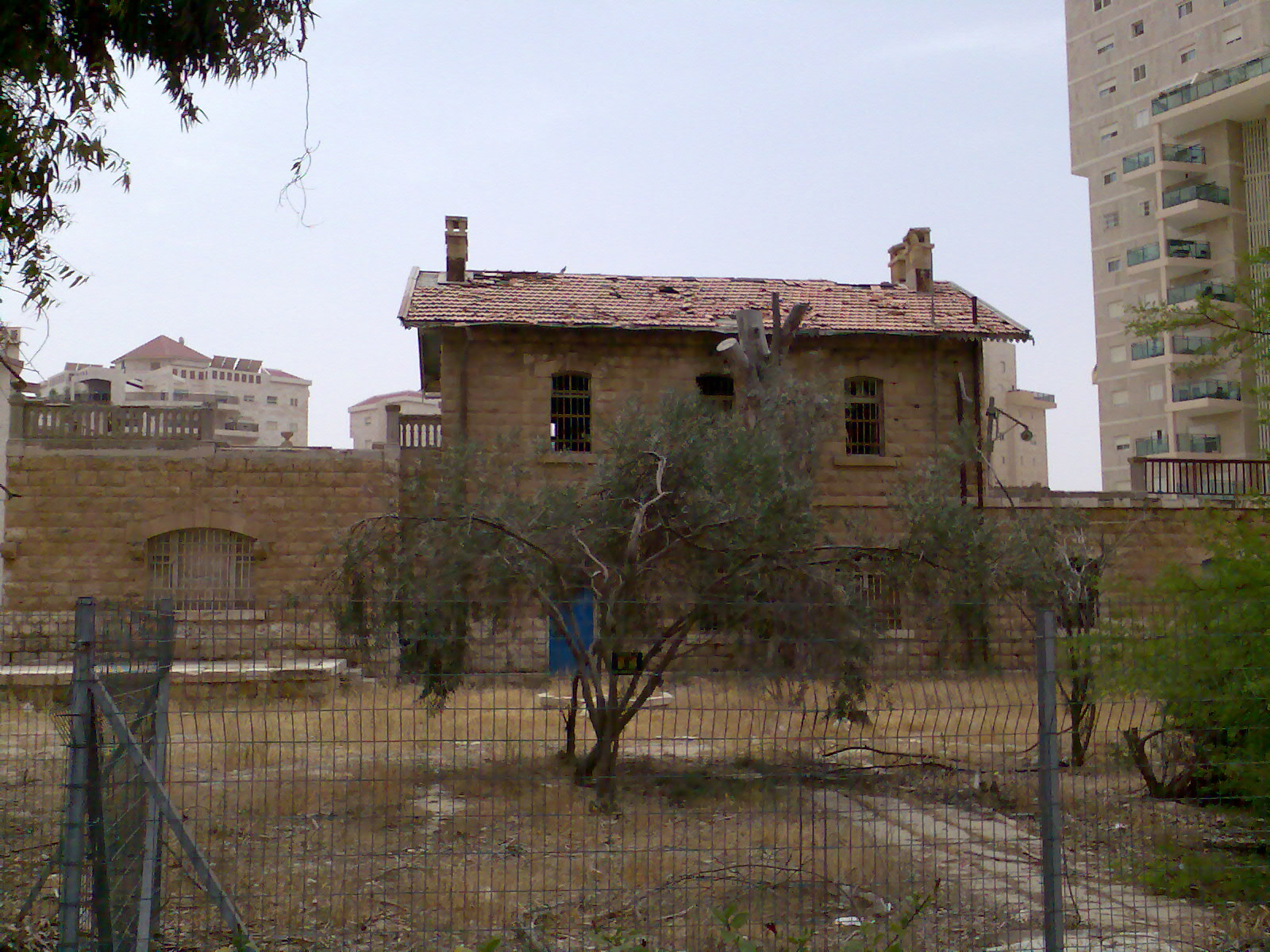
Beersheba Turkish Railway Station

During World War I, the Ottomans built a military railroad from the Hejaz line to Beersheba, inaugurating the station on 30 October 1915. The celebration was attended by the Ottoman army commander Jamal Pasha and other senior government officials. The train line was captured by Allied forces in 1917, towards the end of the war. Today, it forms part of the Israeli railway network.

Beersheba played an important role in the Sinai and Palestine Campaign in World War I. The Battle of Beersheba was part of a wider British offensive in aimed at breaking the Turkish defensive line from Gaza to Beersheba. The Ottoman army engaged in three battles with the British forces near Gaza between 26 March and 7 November 1917. Having failed in the First and Second Battles of Gaza, the British succeeded in the Third Battle of Gaza. On 31 October 1917, three months after taking Rafah, General Allenby's troops breached the line of Turkish defense between Gaza and Beersheba. Approximately five-hundred soldiers of the Australian 4th Light Horse Regiment and the 12th Light Horse Regiment of the 4th Light Horse Brigade, led by Brigadier General William Grant, with only horses and bayonets, charged the Turkish trenches, overran them and captured the wells in what has become known as the Battle of Beersheba, called the "last successful cavalry charge in British military history." On the edge of Beersheba's Old City is a Commonwealth War Graves Commission Cemetery containing the graves of Australian, New Zealand and British soldiers. The town also contains a memorial park dedicated to them.

During the Palestine Mandate, Beersheba was a major administrative center. The British constructed a railway between Rafah and Beersheba in October 1917 which opened to the public in May 1918, serving the Negev and settlements south of Mount Hebron. In 1928, at the beginning of the tension between the Jews and the Arabs over control of Palestine and wide-scale rioting which left 133 Jews dead and 339 wounded, many Jews abandoned Beersheba, although some returned occasionally. After an Arab attack on a Jewish bus in 1936, which escalated into the 1936–39 Arab revolt in Palestine, the remaining Jews left.

At the time of the 1922 census of Palestine, Beersheba had a population of 2,356 (2,012 Muslims, 235 Christians, 98 Jews and 11 Druze). At the time of the 1931 census, Beersheba had 545 occupied houses and a population of 2,959 (2,791 Muslims, 152 Christians, 11 Jews and five Baháʼí). The 1938 village survey did not cover Beersheba due to the area's largely nomadic population and the Rural Property Tax Ordinance not being applied there. The 1945 village survey conducted by the Palestine Mandate government found 5,570 (5,360 Muslims, 200 Christians and 10 others).

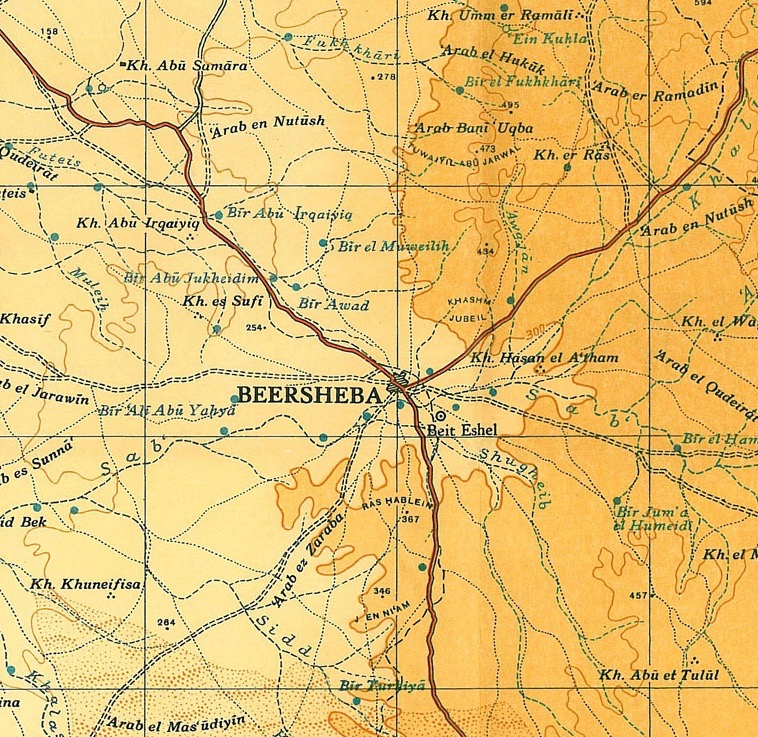
Beersheba 1945 1:250,000

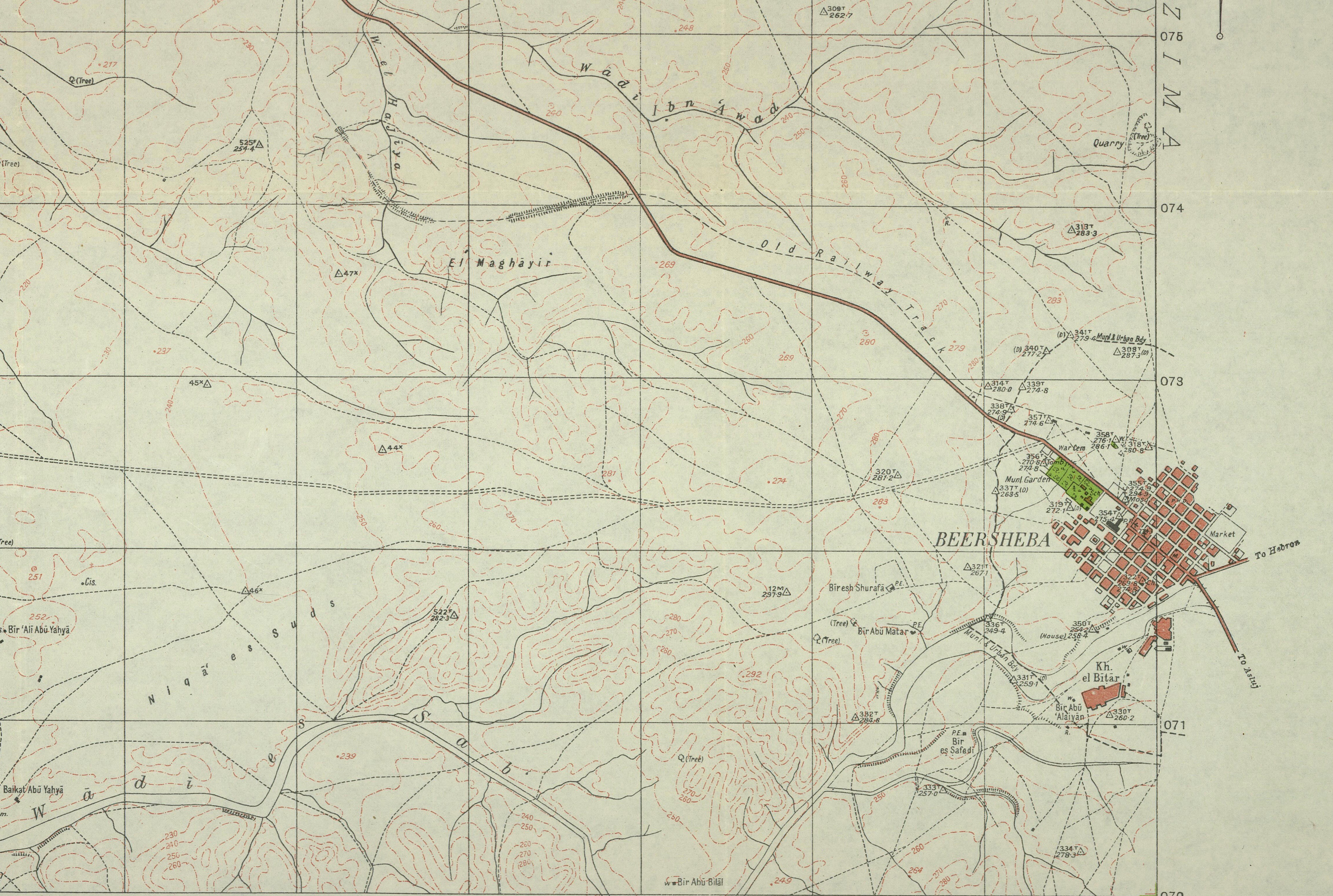
Beersheba 1947 1:20,000

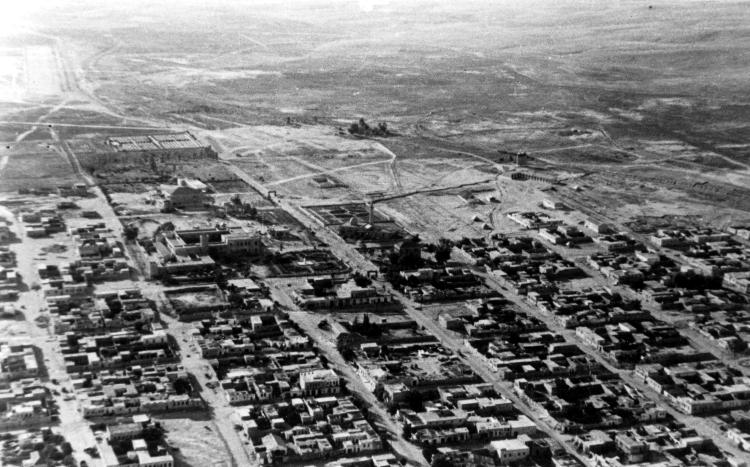
Beersheba, 1948

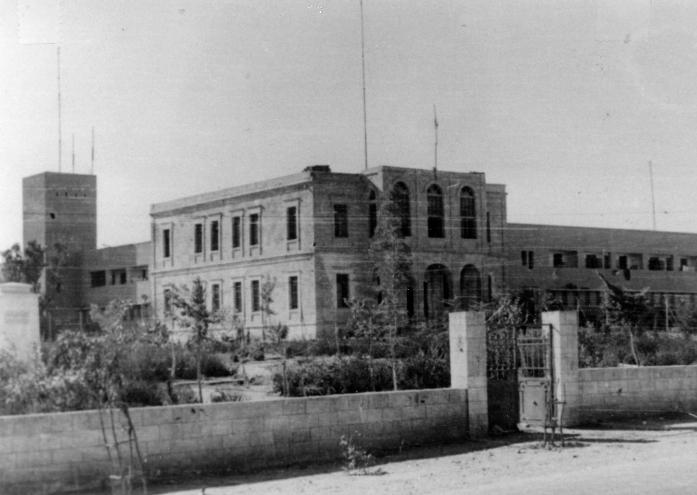
Beersheba police station. 1948. Original building Ottoman with British Mandate addition.

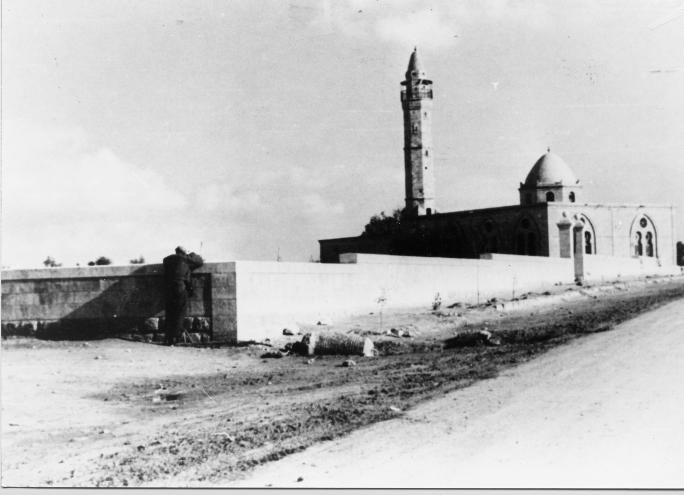
Beersheba mosque, 1948

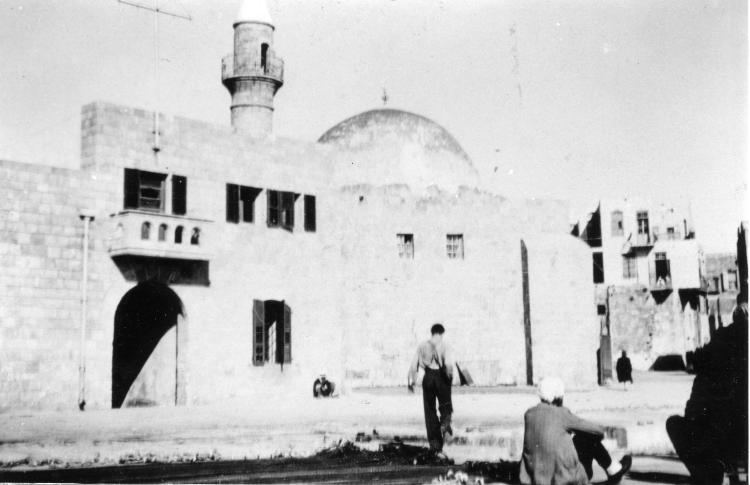
A mosque in Be'ersheva photographed during Operation Yoav, 1948

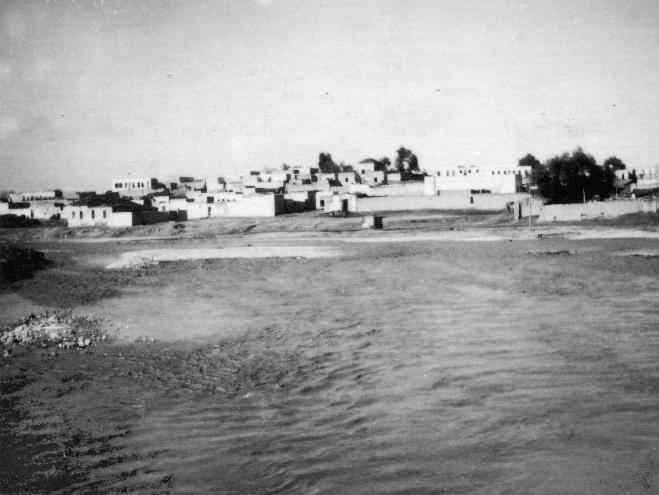
Nahal Beersheba in flood, 1948

=== 1948 Palestine war ===
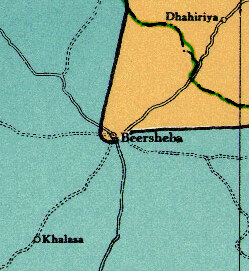
Beersheba was proposed to be in the Arab State in final version of the United Nations Partition Plan for Palestine

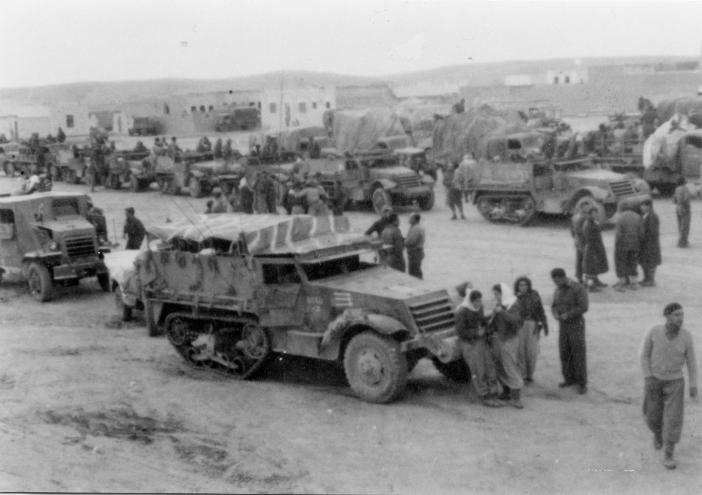
Harel Brigade assembling in Beersheba prior to Operation Horev, 25 December 1948

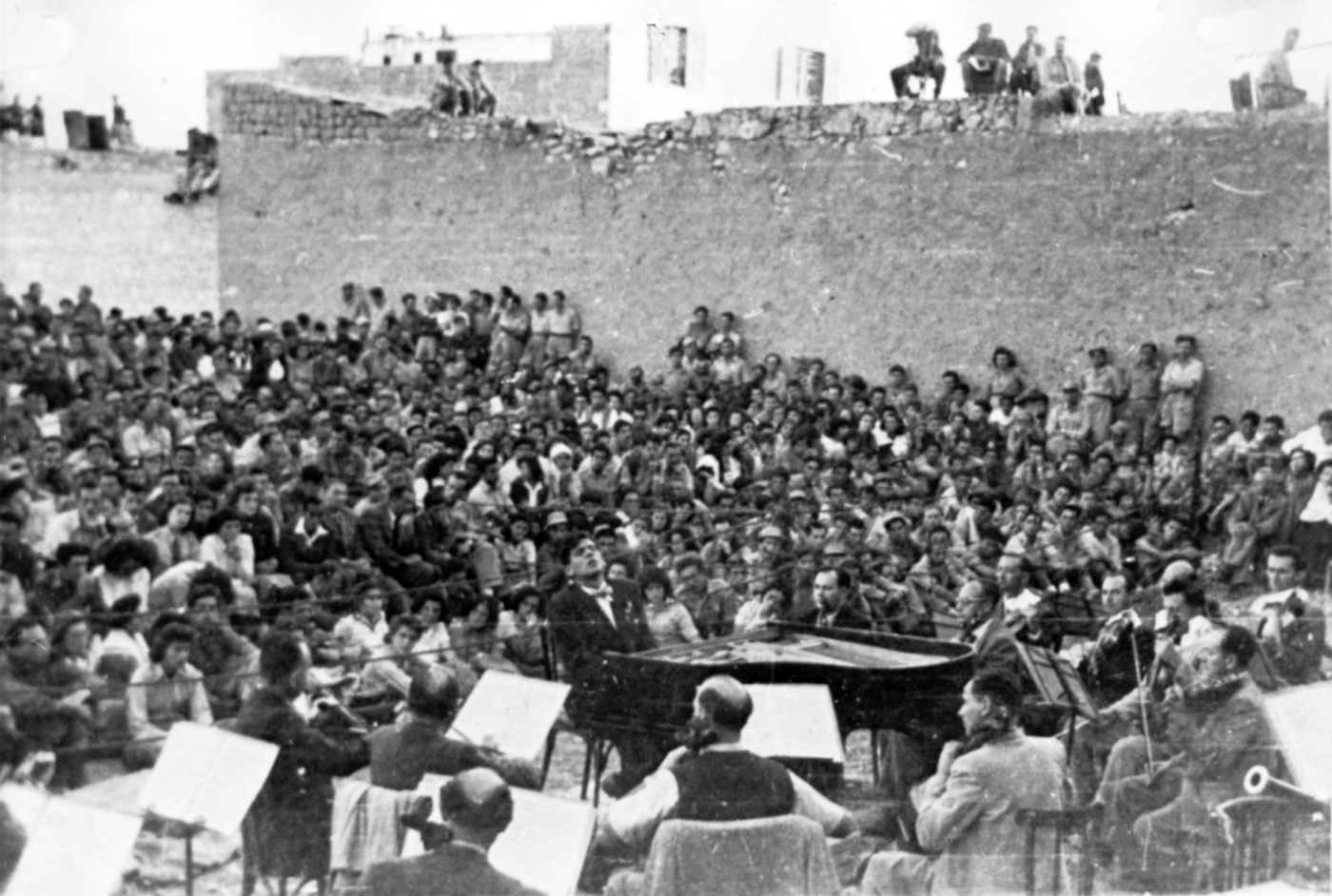
Israel Philharmonic Orchestra performing for Israeli soldiers in Beersheba, November 1948

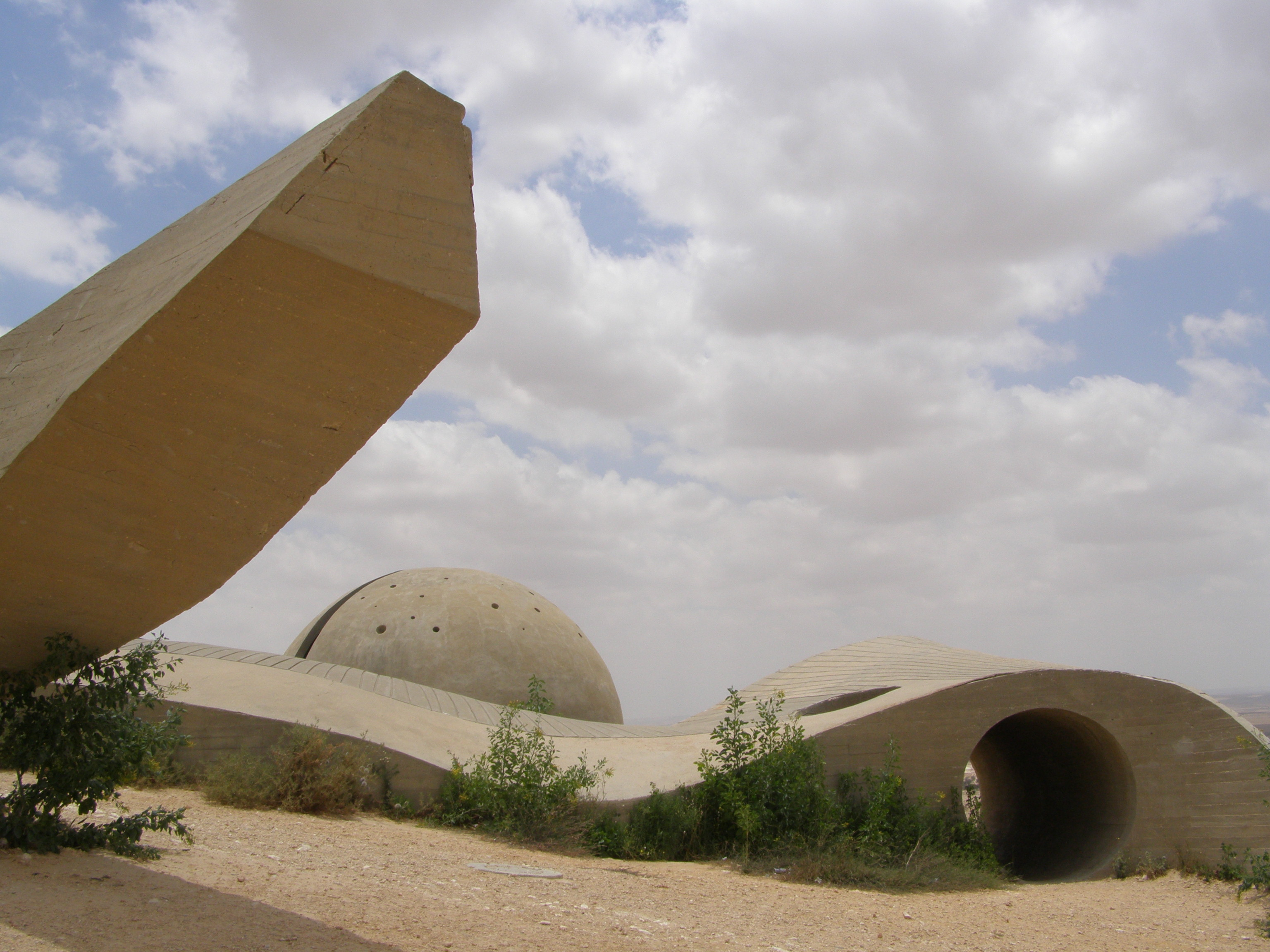
Monument to the Negev Brigade, Danny Karavan

In 1947, the United Nations Special Committee on Palestine (UNSCOP) proposed that Beersheba be included within the Jewish state in their partition plan for Palestine. However, when the UN's Ad Hoc Committee revised the plan, they moved Beersheva to the Arab state on account of it being primarily Arab. Egyptian forces had been stationed at Beersheva since May 1948.

After the Arab states invaded Palestine and declared war on the newly founded Jewish state of Israel, Yigal Allon proposed the conquest of Beersheba, which was approved by Prime Minister David Ben-Gurion. According to Israeli historian Benny Morris, Allon ordered the "conquest of Beersheba, occupation of outposts around it, [and] demolition of most of the town." The objective was to break the Egyptian blockade of Israeli convoys to the Negev. The Egyptian army did not expect an offensive and fled en masse. Israel bombed the town on 16 October.

At 4:00 am on 21 October, the 8th Brigade's 89th battalion and the Negev Brigade's 7th and 9th battalions moved in. Some troops advanced from the Mishmar HaNegev junction, 20 kilometres (12 mi) north of Beersheba and others from the Turkish train station and Hatzerim. By 9:45, Beersheba was in Israeli hands. Around 120 Egyptian soldiers were taken prisoner. All of the Arab inhabitants who had resisted were expelled. The remaining Arab civilians, 200 men and 150 women and children, were taken to the police fort and, on 25 October, the women, children, disabled and elderly were driven by truck to the Gaza border. The Egyptian soldiers were interned in POW camps. Some men lived in the local mosque and were put to work cleaning, however, when it was discovered that they were supplying information to the Egyptian army, they were also deported.

The town was subject to large-scale looting by the Haganah, and by December, in one calculation, the total number of Arabs driven out from Beersheva and surrounding areas reached 30,000 with many ending up in Jordan as refugees.

In February 2026 Haaretz reported on a newly discovered court testimony made by Yisrael Carmi, a battalion commander in the 7th Brigade, wherein he described the capture of Beersheba and stated that the method was to kill civilians who resisted expulsion:

"I conquered the city," Carmi testified. "In mopping up that area, I gave an order to annihilate anyone who appeared in the street, whether they resisted or did not resist. An order was given to destroy everything. After the conquest of the police station – after the surrender – the murder stopped. Until then everyone was killed – women and children and everyone. Then an order was given to the people to go to Hebron. Anyone who didn't go was 'removed'" (quotation marks in the original).

Following Operation Yoav, a 10-kilometer radius exclusion zone around Beersheba was enforced into which no Bedouin were allowed. In response, the United Nations Security Council passed two resolutions on 4 and 16 November demanding that Israel withdraw from the area.

=== Israel ===
==== First four decades ====
Following the conclusion of the war, the 1949 Armistice Agreements formally granted Beersheba to Israel. The town was then transformed into an Israeli city with only an exiguous Arab minority. Beersheba was deemed strategically important due to its location with a reliable water supply and at a major crossroads, northeast to Hebron and Jerusalem, east to the Dead Sea and al Karak, south to Aqaba, west to Gaza and southwest to Al-Auja and the border with Egypt.

After a few months, the town's war-damaged houses were repaired. As a post-independence wave of Jewish immigration to Israel began, Beersheba experienced a population boom as thousands of immigrants moved in. The city rapidly expanded beyond its core, which became known as the "Old City", as new neighborhoods were built around it, complete with various housing projects such as apartment buildings and houses with auxiliary farms, as well as shopping centers and schools. The Old City was turned into a city center, with shops, restaurants, and government and utility offices. An industrial area and one of the largest cinemas in Israel were also built in the city. By 1956, Beersheba was a booming city of 22,000. In 1959, during the Wadi Salib riots, riots spread quickly to other parts of the country, including Beersheba.

Soroka Hospital opened its doors in 1960. By 1968, the population had grown to 80,000. The University of the Negev, which would later become Ben-Gurion University of the Negev, was established in 1969. The then Egyptian president Anwar Sadat visited Beersheba in 1979. In 1983, its population was more than 110,000. During the 1990s post-Soviet aliyah, the city's population greatly increased as many immigrants from the former Soviet Union settled there.

==== Urban development in the 21st century ====
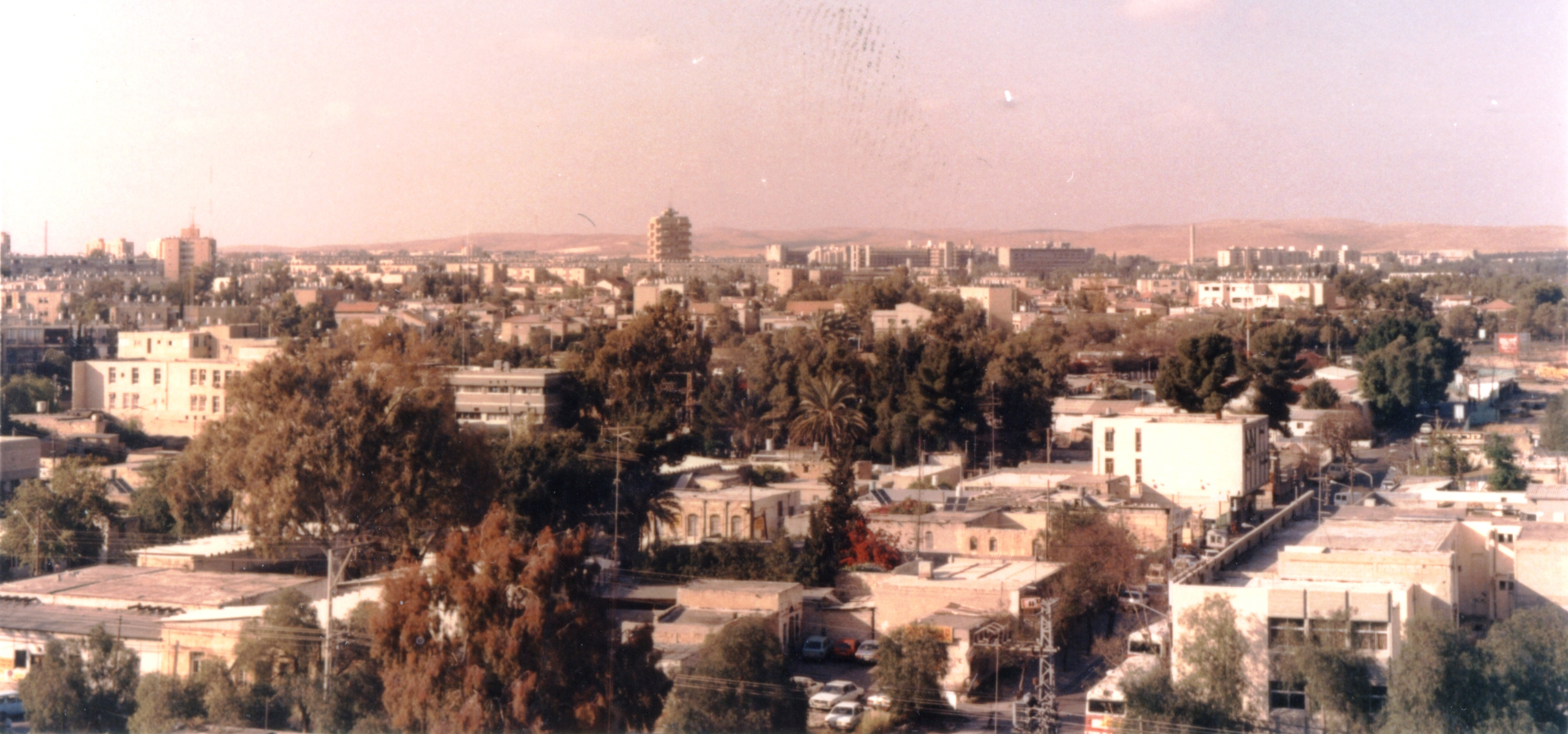
Beersheba in the mid-1980s

As part of its Blueprint Negev project, the Jewish National Fund funded major redevelopment projects in Beersheba. One such project is the Beersheba River Walk, a 900-acre (3.6-square-kilometre) riverfront park stretching along 8 kilometers of the riverside and containing a 15-acre (6.1-hectare) manmade boating lake, a 12,000-seat amphitheater, green spaces, playgrounds, and a bridge along the route of the city's Mekorot water pipes. The Beersheba River had previously been used as a dumping site and filled with untreated wastewater. After the renovation, the river was transformed and now flows with high-quality purified wastewater. At the official entrance to the river park is the Beit Eshel Park, which consists of a park built around a courtyard with historic remains from the settlement of Beit Eshel.

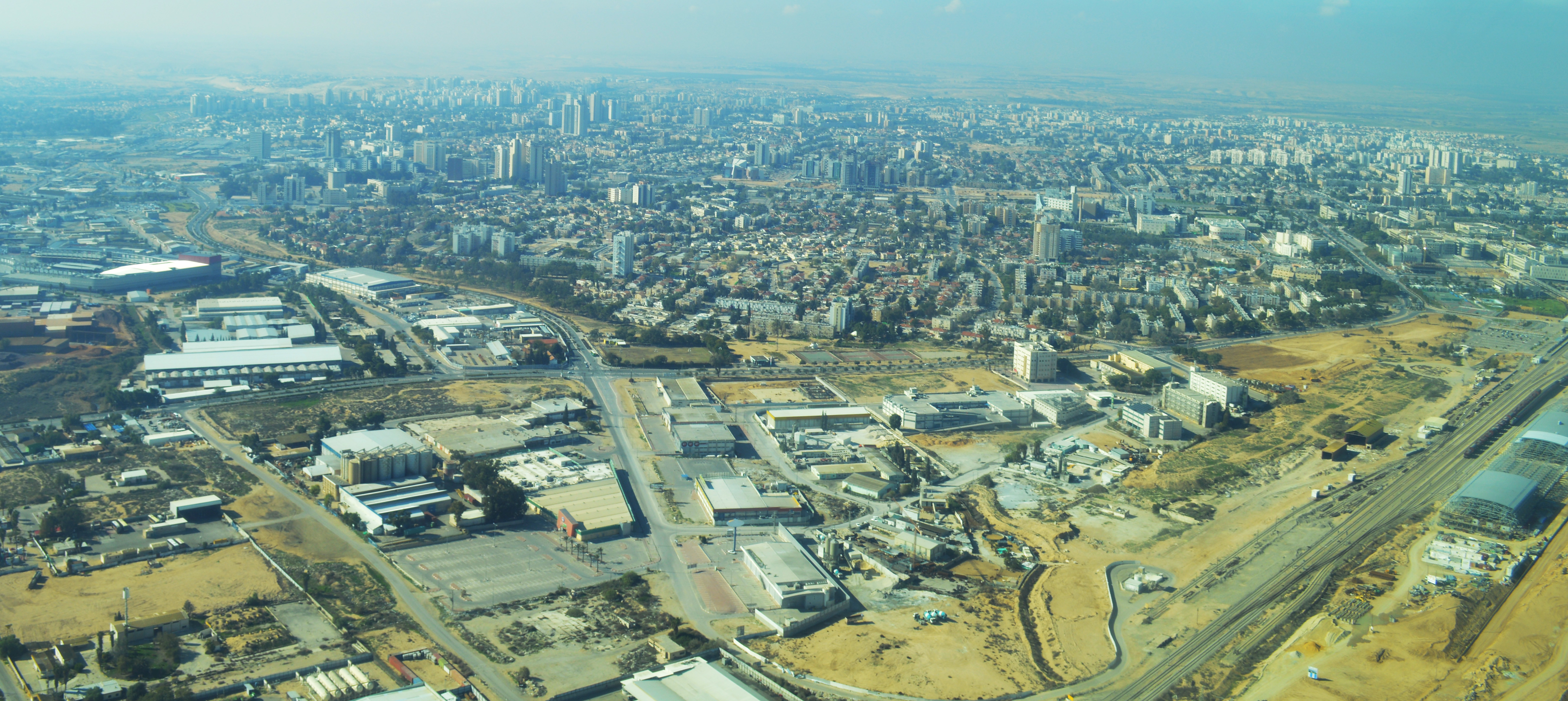
Panorama of Beersheba

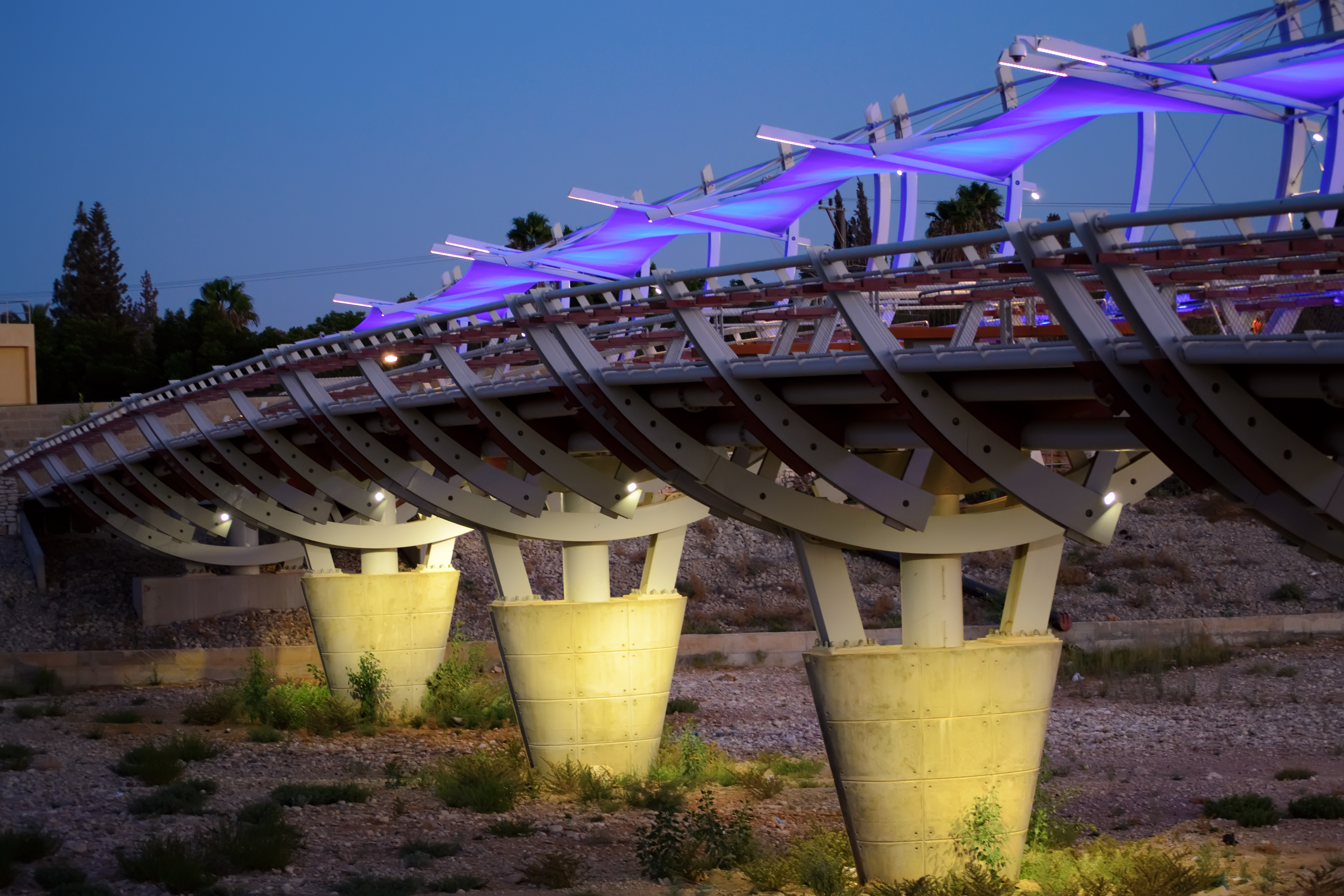
Pipes Bridge, 2012

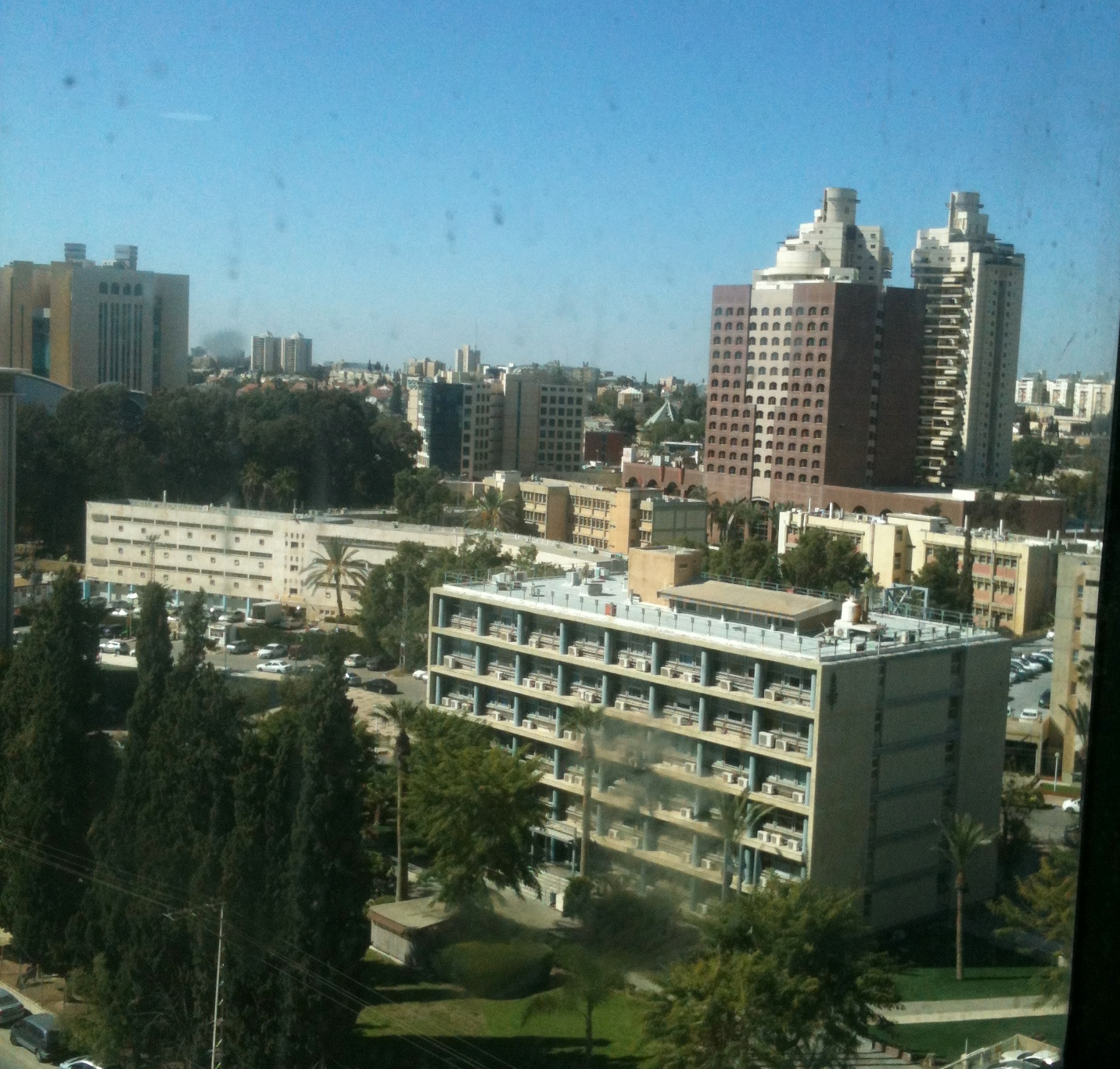
Modern Beersheba

Four new shopping malls were also built. Among them is Kanyon Beersheba, a 115,000-square-metre (1,240,000-square-foot) ecologically planned mall with pools for collecting rainwater and lighting generated by solar panels on the roof. It will be situated next to an 8,000-meter park with bicycle paths. In addition, the first ever farmer's market in Israel was established as an enclosed, circular complex with 400 spaces for vendors surrounded by parks and greenery.

A new central bus station was built in the city. The station has a glass-enclosed complex also containing shops and cafés.

Some $10.5 million was also invested in renovating Beersheba's Old City, preserving historical buildings and upgrading infrastructure. The Turkish Quarter was also redeveloped with newly cobbled streets, widened sidewalks, and the restoration of Turkish homes into areas for dining and shopping.

In 2011, city hall announced plans to turn Beersheba into the "water city" of Israel. One of the projects, "Beersheva beach", is a 7-dunam fountain opposite city hall. Other projects included fountains near the Soroka Medical Center and in front of the Shamoon College of Engineering.

In the 1990s, as skyscrapers began to appear in Israel, the construction of high-rise buildings began in Beersheba. Today, downtown Beersheba has been described as a "clean, compact, and somewhat sterile-looking collection of high-rise office and residential towers." The city's tallest building is Rambam Square 2, a 32-story apartment building. Many additional high-rise buildings are planned or are under construction, including skyscrapers. There are further plans to build luxury residential towers in the city.

In December 2012, a plan to build 16,000 new housing units in the Ramot Gimel neighborhood was scrapped in favor of creating a new urban forest, which spans 1,360 acres (550 ha) and serves as the area's "green lung", as part of the plans to develop a "green band" around the city. The forest includes designated picnic areas, biking trails, and walking trails. According to Mayor Ruvik Danilovich, Beersheba still has an abundance of open, underdeveloped spaces that can be used for urban development.

In 2017, a new urban building plan was approved for the city, designed to raise the city's population to 340,000 by 2030. Under the plan, 13,000 more housing units will be built, along with industrial and business developments occupying a total of four million square meters. A second public hospital is also planned. Planning for the Beersheba Light Rail also began. In 2019, the construction of a new public hospital, which will be named after Shimon Peres, was approved. The hospital will be a 345-acre (140 ha) complex that will feature 1,900 beds, commerce, hotel, alternative medicine, and paramedical services, and research centers, with the possibility of apartment units for medical faculty employees, students, and senior housing. It will be linked to the rest of the city by a light rail system.

In 2021, an outline plan was approved for the construction of 34,000 housing units in the city to increase the population to 400,000, as well as the construction of 4 million square meters of office and commercial space, 3 million square meters of industrial space, 2.7 million square meters of space in public buildings, and 370,000 square meters of space for the tourism industry. One of the primary goals of the plan is to boost connections between neighborhoods through a continuous network of streets which will be shaded and give preference to public transport and pedestrians. Under the plan, construction in the city center will be boosted and Rager Boulevard, which the plan identifies as the city's main avenue, will be turned from a multi-lane road into an urban avenue with expanded residential construction alongside it.

==== Security incidents in the city ====
On 19 October 1998, sixty-four people were wounded in a grenade attack. On 31 August 2004, sixteen people were killed in two suicide bombings on commuter buses in Beersheba for which Hamas claimed responsibility. On 28 August 2005, another suicide bomber attacked the central bus station, seriously injuring two security guards and 45 bystanders. During Operation Cast Lead, which began on 27 December 2008, and lasted until the ceasefire on 18 January 2009, Hamas fired 2,378 rockets (such as Grad rockets) and mortars, from Gaza into southern Israel, including Beersheba. The rocket attacks have continued, but have been only partially effective since the introduction of the Iron Dome rocket defense system.

In 2010, an Arab attacked and injured two people with an axe. In 2012, a Palestinian from Jenin was stopped before a stabbing attack in a "safe house". On 18 October 2015, a lone gunman shot and killed a soldier guarding the Beersheva bus station before being gunned down by police. In September 2016, the Shin Bet thwarted a Palestinian Islamic Jihad terror attack at a wedding hall in Beersheba.

On 22 March 2022, a convicted Islamic State supporter carried out a stabbing and vehicle-ramming attack, killing four people and injuring two others.

During the Gaza war, the city became the target of several rocket attacks.

During the Iran–Israel war in 2025, the city was targeted by Iran. On 19 June, the Soroka Medical Center was struck by an Iranian ballistic missile, destroying the hospital's surgical ward, causing widespread destruction to nearby buildings and injuring at least 80 people. On 24 June, after the ceasefire agreement came into effect, Iran launched missiles towards a residential building in the city, killing 5 civilians and injuring 20.

On 29 March 2026, 11 people were injured as a result of a missile strike during the 2026 Iran war, with a further 20 treated for "acute anxiety" by Magen David Adom.

== Emblem of Beersheba ==
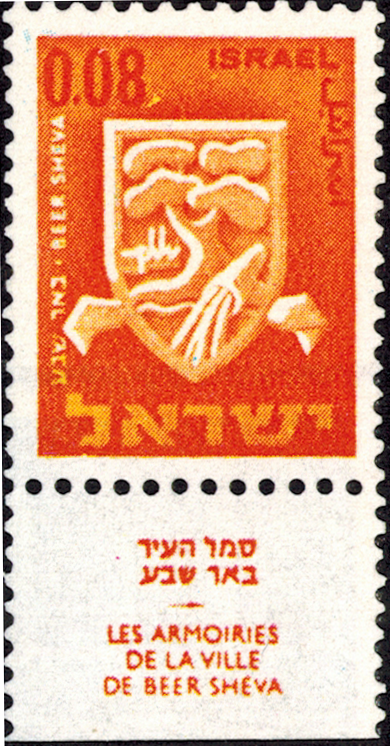
Beersheva emblem on a 1965 stamp

Since 1950, Beersheba has changed its municipal emblem several times. The 1950 emblem, designed by Abraham Khalili, featured a tamarix tree, a factory and water flowing from a pipeline. In 1972, the emblem was modernized with the symbolic representation of the Twelve Tribes and a tower. Words from the Bible are inscribed: Abraham "planted a tamarisk tree in Beersheba." (Genesis 21:33) Since 2012, it has incorporated the number seven as part of the city rebranding.

== Geography ==
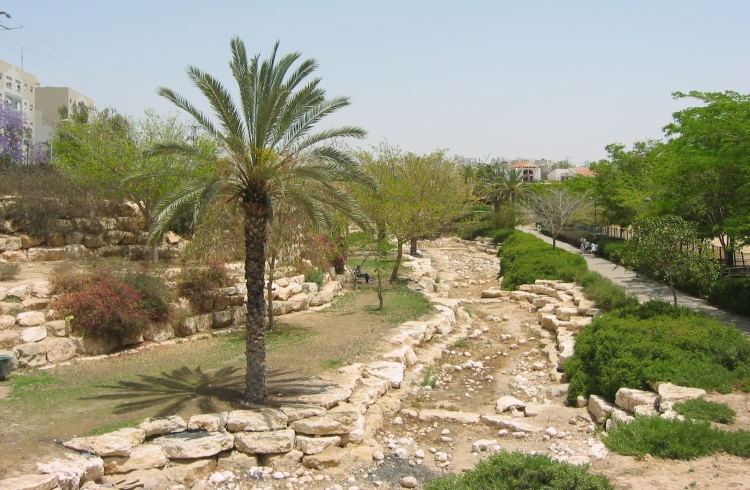
Dry riverbed in Nahal Ashan park

Beersheba is located on the northern edge of the Negev desert 115 kilometres (71 mi) south-east of Tel Aviv and 120 kilometres (75 mi) south-west of Jerusalem. The city is located on the main route from the center and north of the country to Eilat in the far south. The Beersheba Valley has been populated for thousands of years, as it has available water, which flows from the Hebron hills in the winter and is stored underground in vast quantities. The main river in Beersheba is Nahal Be'er Sheva, a stream that flows year round and occasionally floods in the winter. The Kovshim and Katef streams are other important wadis that pass through the city. Beersheba is surrounded by several satellite towns, including Omer, Lehavim, and Meitar, and the Bedouin localities of Rahat, Tel as-Sabi, and Lakiya. Just northwest of the city (near Ramot neighborhood) is a region called Goral hills (heb:גבעות גורל lit: hills of fate), the area has hills with up to 500 metres (1,600 feet) above sea level and low as 300 metres (980 feet) above sea level. Due to heavy construction the flora unique to the area is endangered. Northeast of the city (north to the Neve Menahem neighborhood) there are Loess plains and dry river bands.

=== Climate ===
Beersheba has a hot arid climate (Köppen climate classification BWh) bordering upon a hot semi-arid climate (BSh) though with Mediterranean influences. The city has characteristics of both Mediterranean and desert climates. Summers are hot and dry, and winters are mild. Rainfall is highly concentrated in the winter season. In summer, the temperatures are high in daytime and nighttime with an average high of 34.7 °C (94 °F) and an average low of 21.4 °C (71 °F). Winters have an average high of 17.7 °C (64 °F) and average low of 7.1 °C (45 °F). Snow is very rare; a snowfall on 20 February 2015, was the first such occurrence in the city since 2000.

Precipitation in summer is rare, most rainfalls come in winter between September and May, but the annual amount is low, averaging 195.1 millimeters (7.7 in) per year. There are sandstorms in summer. Haze and fog are common in winter, as a result of high humidity.

Climate data for Beersheba (1991-2020)
Month	Jan	Feb	Mar	Apr	May	Jun	Jul	Aug	Sep	Oct	Nov	Dec	Year
Record high °C (°F)	31.5 (88.7)	35.2 (95.4)	38.4 (101.1)	43.8 (110.8)	44.8 (112.6)	46.0 (114.8)	42.4 (108.3)	43.8 (110.8)	44.0 (111.2)	41.7 (107.1)	38.3 (100.9)	32.5 (90.5)	46.0 (114.8)
Mean daily maximum °C (°F)	17.2 (63.0)	18.6 (65.5)	22.1 (71.8)	26.7 (80.1)	30.6 (87.1)	33.1 (91.6)	34.5 (94.1)	34.6 (94.3)	32.9 (91.2)	30.0 (86.0)	24.6 (76.3)	19.5 (67.1)	27.0 (80.6)
Daily mean °C (°F)	12.0 (53.6)	13.1 (55.6)	16.0 (60.8)	19.7 (67.5)	23.3 (73.9)	26.1 (79.0)	27.9 (82.2)	28.1 (82.6)	26.3 (79.3)	23.4 (74.1)	18.4 (65.1)	13.9 (57.0)	20.7 (69.3)
Mean daily minimum °C (°F)	6.8 (44.2)	7.7 (45.9)	9.8 (49.6)	12.7 (54.9)	16.0 (60.8)	19.0 (66.2)	21.2 (70.2)	21.5 (70.7)	19.5 (67.1)	16.7 (62.1)	12.1 (53.8)	8.3 (46.9)	14.3 (57.7)
Record low °C (°F)	−1.3 (29.7)	0.4 (32.7)	1.4 (34.5)	4.0 (39.2)	7.7 (45.9)	12.6 (54.7)	15.4 (59.7)	15.6 (60.1)	11.1 (52.0)	9.0 (48.2)	3.1 (37.6)	0.2 (32.4)	−1.3 (29.7)
Average precipitation mm (inches)	54.5 (2.15)	39.5 (1.56)	26.3 (1.04)	6.1 (0.24)	3.6 (0.14)	0.1 (0.00)	0.0 (0.0)	0.0 (0.0)	0.2 (0.01)	8.2 (0.32)	17.9 (0.70)	36.4 (1.43)	192.8 (7.59)
Average precipitation days (≥ 1.0 mm)	6.3	5.6	3.7	1.1	0.5	0.0	0.0	0.0	0.1	1.3	2.9	4.8	26.3
Mean monthly sunshine hours	193.4	176.4	219.0	284.9	329.9	365.2	373.7	350.4	305.3	279.6	211.3	185.7	3,274.8
Source 1: NOAA, DWD (sun 2015-2023)
Source 2: Israel Meteorological Service (records)

Climate data for Beersheba
Month	Jan	Feb	Mar	Apr	May	Jun	Jul	Aug	Sep	Oct	Nov	Dec	Year
Record high °C (°F)	31.5 (88.7)	35.2 (95.4)	38.4 (101.1)	43.8 (110.8)	44.8 (112.6)	46.0 (114.8)	42.0 (107.6)	43.8 (110.8)	44.0 (111.2)	41.7 (107.1)	38.3 (100.9)	32.5 (90.5)	46.0 (114.8)
Mean maximum °C (°F)	24.6 (76.3)	27.3 (81.1)	32.0 (89.6)	37.5 (99.5)	38.7 (101.7)	39.6 (103.3)	39.3 (102.7)	38.3 (100.9)	38.7 (101.7)	36.8 (98.2)	31.9 (89.4)	26.9 (80.4)	39.6 (103.3)
Mean daily maximum °C (°F)	17.7 (63.9)	18.7 (65.7)	22.0 (71.6)	26.5 (79.7)	30.5 (86.9)	33.1 (91.6)	34.7 (94.5)	34.7 (94.5)	32.9 (91.2)	29.7 (85.5)	25.0 (77.0)	20.0 (68.0)	27.1 (80.8)
Daily mean °C (°F)	12.4 (54.3)	13.2 (55.8)	15.9 (60.6)	19.7 (67.5)	23.2 (73.8)	26.1 (79.0)	28.0 (82.4)	28.1 (82.6)	26.2 (79.2)	23.2 (73.8)	18.6 (65.5)	14.4 (57.9)	20.7 (69.4)
Mean daily minimum °C (°F)	7.1 (44.8)	7.7 (45.9)	9.8 (49.6)	12.8 (55.0)	16.0 (60.8)	19.0 (66.2)	21.3 (70.3)	21.5 (70.7)	19.6 (67.3)	16.7 (62.1)	12.2 (54.0)	8.8 (47.8)	14.4 (57.9)
Mean minimum °C (°F)	2.8 (37.0)	4.0 (39.2)	5.3 (41.5)	7.2 (45.0)	11.1 (52.0)	15.4 (59.7)	18.4 (65.1)	18.4 (65.1)	16.0 (60.8)	12.4 (54.3)	7.5 (45.5)	4.8 (40.6)	2.8 (37.0)
Record low °C (°F)	1.4 (34.5)	0.5 (32.9)	2.4 (36.3)	4 (39)	8 (46)	13.6 (56.5)	15.8 (60.4)	15.6 (60.1)	13 (55)	10.2 (50.4)	3.4 (38.1)	3 (37)	0.5 (32.9)
Average rainfall mm (inches)	48 (1.9)	40 (1.6)	29 (1.1)	9 (0.4)	3.6 (0.14)	0 (0)	0 (0)	0 (0)	0.5 (0.02)	9 (0.4)	18 (0.7)	38 (1.5)	195.1 (7.76)
Average rainy days	9	8	6	2	1	0	0	0	0.2	2	4	7	39.2
Average relative humidity (%)	50	48	44	35	34	36	38	41	43	42	42	48	42
Source 1: Israel Meteorological Service
Source 2: Israel Meteorological Service

== Demographics ==
Historical population
Year	Pop.	±%
1972	86,600	—
1983	110,100	+27.1%
1995	150,000	+36.2%
2008	193,500	+29.0%
2022	217,577	+12.4%
2024	223,587	+2.8%

Beersheba is one of the fastest-growing cities in Israel. Though it has a population of about 200,000, the city is larger in area than Tel Aviv, and its urban plan calls for an eventual population of 450,000–500,000. It is planned to have a population of 340,000 by 2030. The population of Beersheba is predominantly Jewish. Jews and others represent 97.3% of the population, of whom Jews are 86.5%. Arabs constitute around 2.69% of city population. The Israel Central Bureau of Statistics divides the Beersheba metropolitan area into two areas:

Metropolitan rings in the Beersheba metropolitan area
Metropolitan ring	Localities	Population (2014 census)				Population density (per km^{2})	Annual Population growth rate
Metropolitan ring	Localities	Israeli Jews	Israeli Arabs	Others (Note: Others includes non-Arab Christians and those not classified by religion.)	Total	Population density (per km^{2})	Annual Population growth rate
Core (Note: Includes the city of Beersheba)	1	177,200	4,400	19,500	201,100	1,711	0.9%
Outer Ring (Note: Includes the cities Rahat and Ofakim, the local councils Lehavim, Omer and Tel Sheva, as well as many smaller towns (local councils).)	32	35,700	124,100	500	160,300	286	3.0%
Total	33	212,900	128,500	20,000	361,400	1277	1.8%

== Economy ==
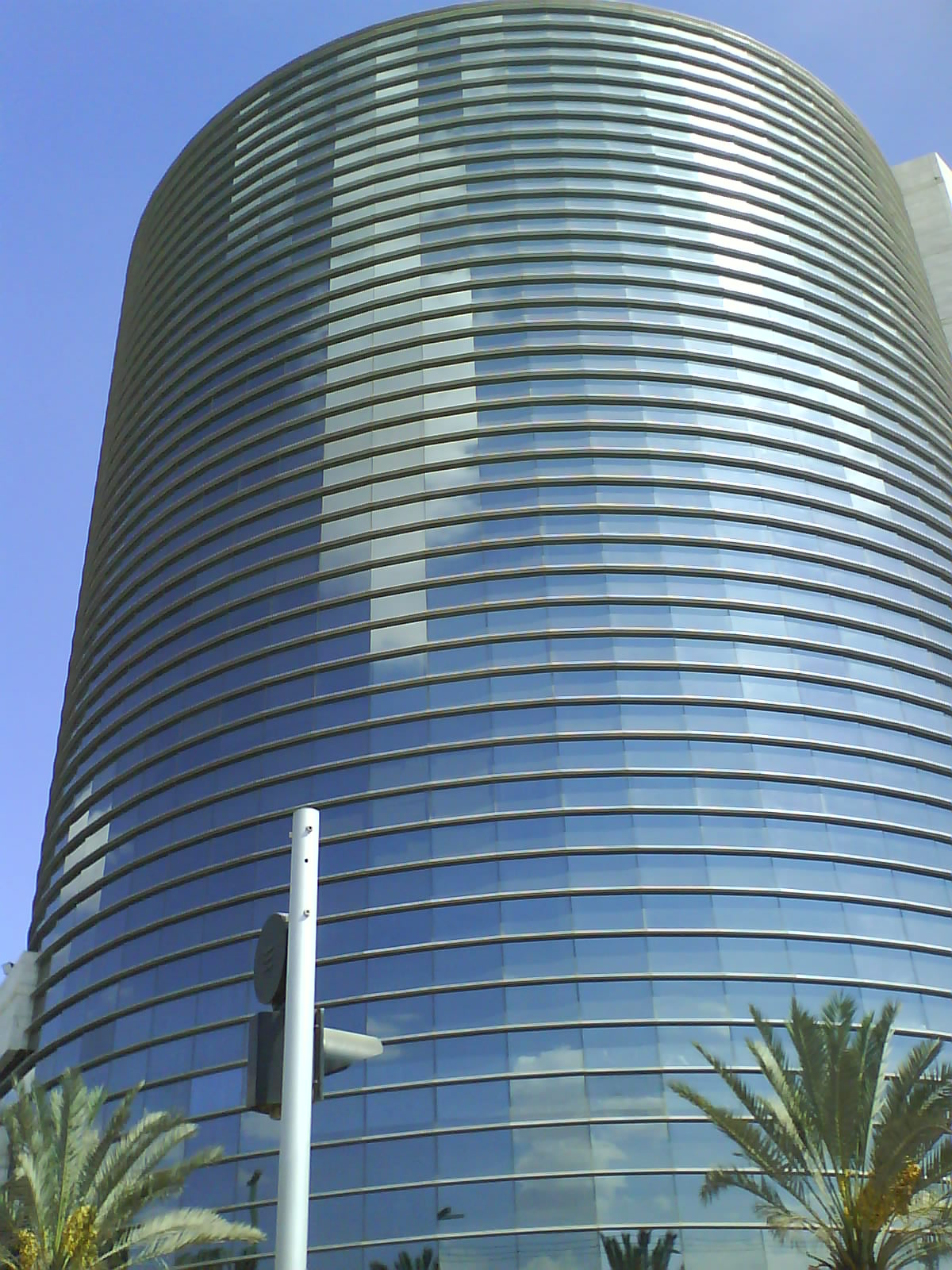
Negev Mall Tower

The largest employers in Beersheba are Soroka Medical Center, the municipality, Israel Defense Forces and Ben-Gurion University. A major Israel Aerospace Industries complex is located in the main industrial zone, north of Highway 60. Numerous electronics and chemical plants, including Teva Pharmaceutical Industries, are located in and around the city.

Beersheba is emerging as a high-tech center, with an emphasis on cyber security. A large high-tech park was built near the Be'er Sheva North Railway Station in 2012 and a fifth commercial building begun to be constructed. Deutsche Telekom, Elbit Systems, EMC, Lockheed Martin, Ness Technologies, WeWork and RAD Data Communications have opened facilities there, as has a cyberincubator run by Jerusalem Venture Partners. A Science park funded by the RASHI-SACTA Foundation, Beersheba Municipality and private donors was completed in 2008. Another high-tech park is located north of the city near Omer.

An additional three industrial zones are located on the southeastern side of the city – Makhteshim, Emek Sara and Kiryat Yehudit – and a light industry zone between Kiryat Yehudit and the Old City.

== Local government ==
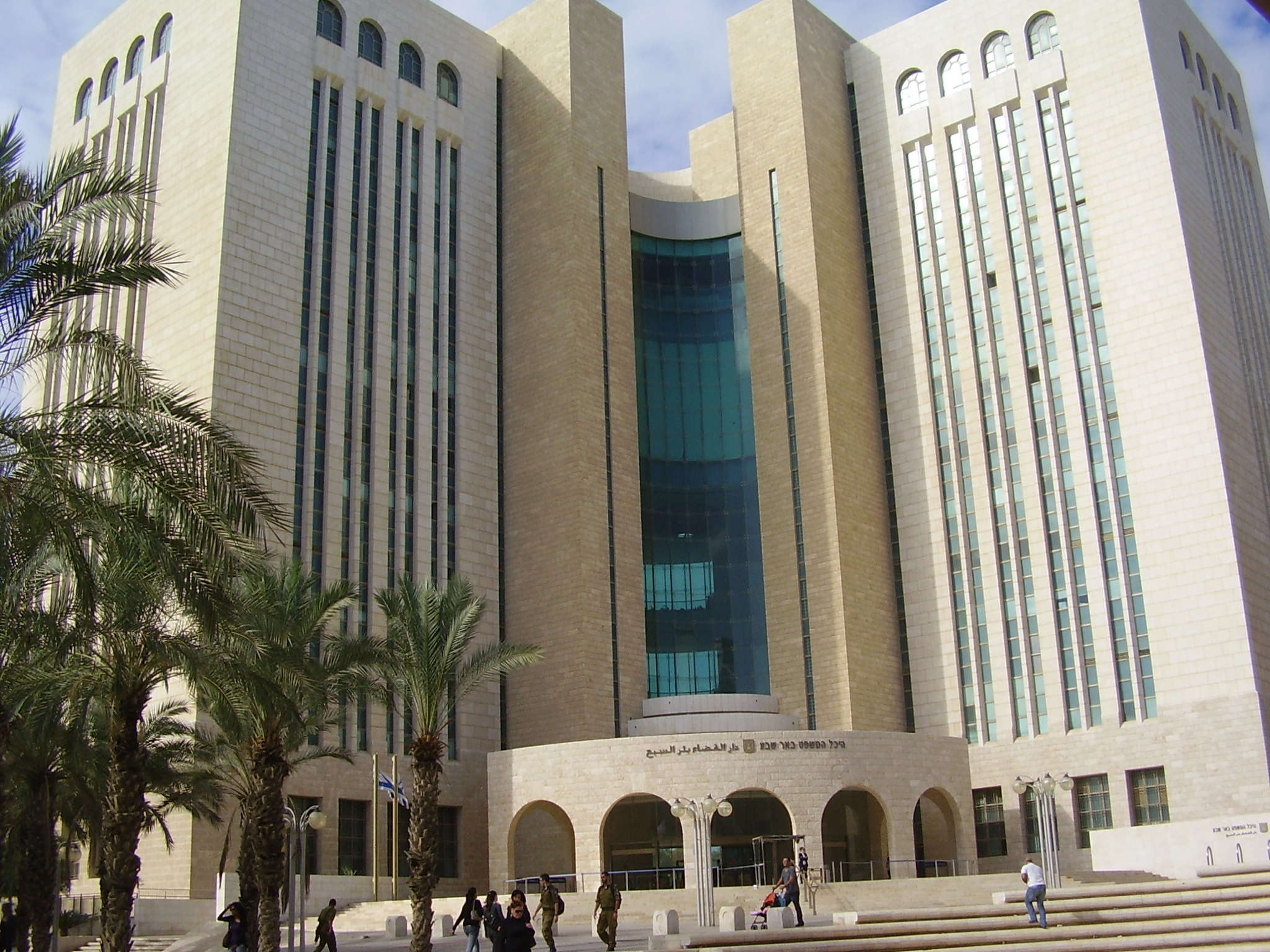
Beersheba District Court

The mayor of Beersheba is Ruvik Danilovich, who was deputy mayor under Yaakov Turner.

Mayors of Beersheba
	Name	Political party	Took office	Left office	Years in office
1	David Tuviyahu	Mapai	1950	1961	11
2	Ze'ev Zrizi	Mapam	1961	1963	2
3	Eliyahu Nawi	Mapai	1963	1986	23
4	Moshe Zilberman (Mayor)	Independent	1986	1989	3
5	Yitzhak Rager	Likud	1989	1997	8
6	David Bunfeld	Likud	1997	1998	1
7	Yaakov Terner	Labor	1998	2008	10
8	Ruvik Danilovich	Labor, New Way	2008		

== Educational institutions ==
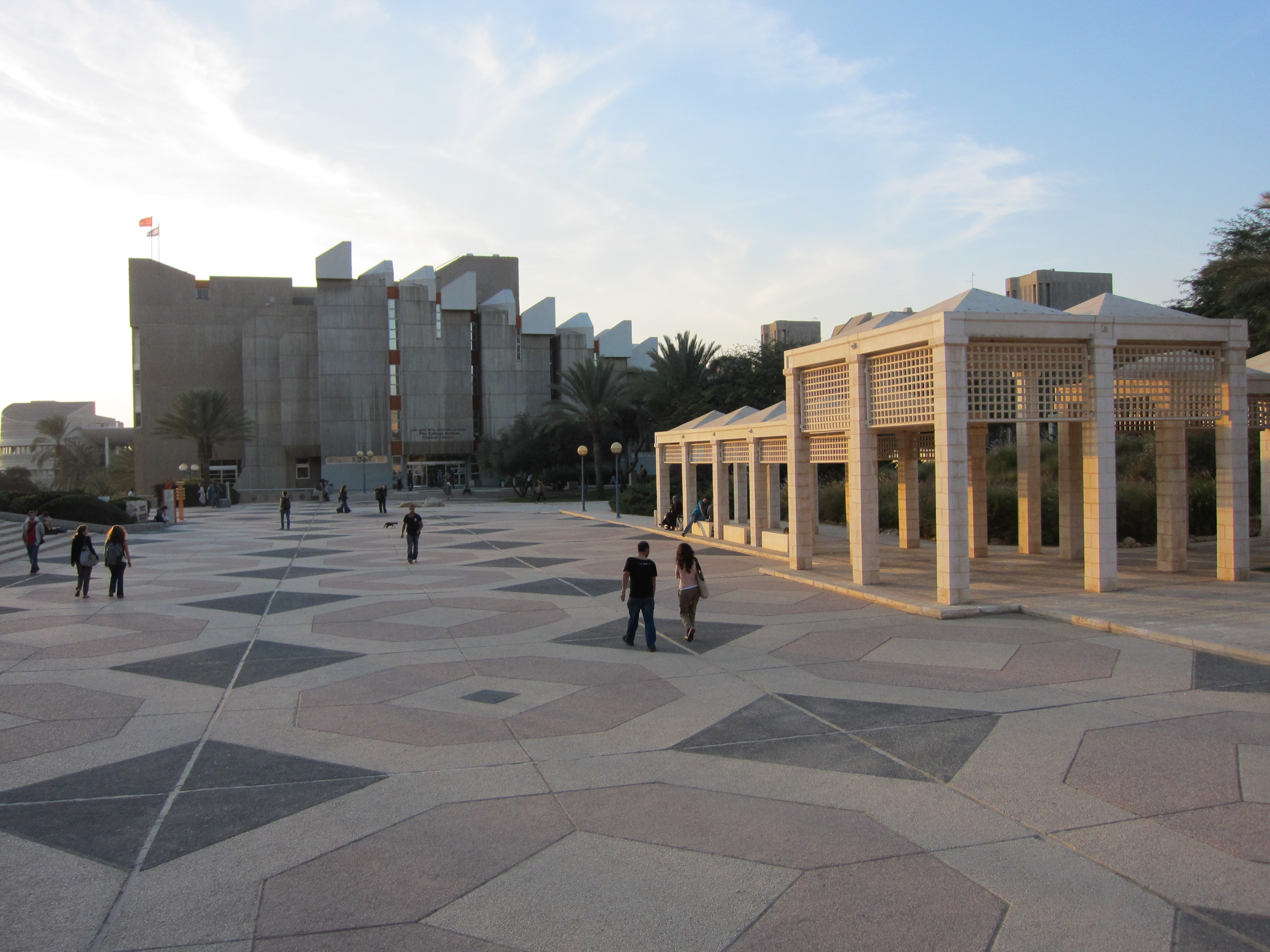
Ben Gurion University of the Negev

According to the Israel Central Bureau of Statistics, in 2022, Beersheba has a ca.8,975 preschoolers in ca.300 preschools & kindergartens. A total of 99 schools teaching a student population of ca.45,291: 60 elementary schools with an enrollment of 19,617 (ca.3,200 of whom are entering the 1st grade), and 39 high schools with an enrollment of 16,699. Of Beersheba's 12th graders, 90% earned a Bagrut matriculation certificate in 2022. The city also has several private schools and yeshivot in the religious sector with 3,000 or more students.

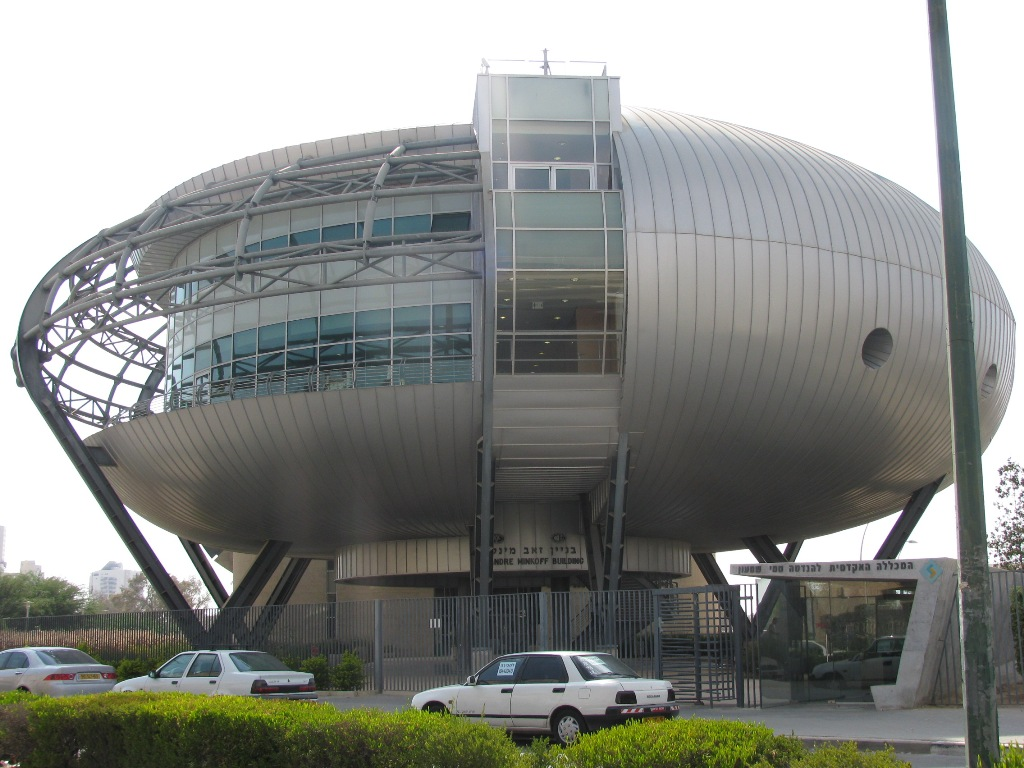
Shamoon College of Engineering

Beersheba is home to one of Israel's major universities, Ben-Gurion University of the Negev, located on an urban campus in the city (Dalet neighborhood). Other schools in Beersheva are the Open University of Israel, Shamoon College of Engineering (SCE), Kaye Academic College of Education, Practical Engineering College of Beersheba (Hamikhlala ha technologit shel Be'er sheva), and a campus of the Israeli Air and Space College (Techni Be'er sheva).

== Neighborhoods ==
After Israeli independence, Beersheba became a "laboratory" for Israeli architecture. Mishol Girit, a neighborhood built in the late 1950s, was the first attempt to create an alternative to the standard public housing projects in Israel. Hashatiah (literally, "the carpet"), also known as Hashekhuna ledugma (the model neighborhood), was hailed by architects around the world. Today, Beersheba is divided into seventeen residential neighborhoods in addition to the Old City and Ramot, an umbrella neighborhood of four sub-districts. Many of the neighbourhoods are named after letters of the Hebrew alphabet, which also have numerical value, but descriptive place names have been given to some of the newer neighborhoods.

== Culture ==
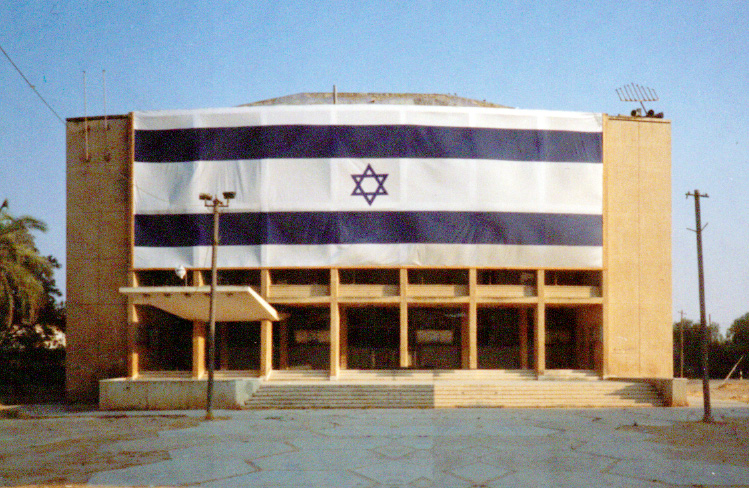
Keren Cinema, first movie theater in the Negev

In 1953, Cinema Keren, the Negev's first movie theater, opened in Beersheba. It was built by the Histadrut and had seating for 1,200 people. Beersheba is the home base of the Israel Sinfonietta, founded in 1973. Over the years, the Sinfonietta has developed a broad repertoire of symphonic works, concerti for solo instruments and large choral productions, among them Handel's Israel in Egypt, masses by Schubert and Mozart, Rossini's "Stabat Mater" and Vivaldi's "Gloria". World-famous artists have appeared as soloists with the Sinfonietta, including Pinchas Zukerman, Jean-Pierre Rampal, Shlomo Mintz, Gary Karr, and Paul Tortelier. In the 1970s, a memorial commemorating fallen Israeli soldiers designed by the sculptor Danny Karavan was erected on a hill north-east of the city. The Beersheba Theater opened in 1973. The Light Opera Group of the Negev, established in 1980, performs musicals in English every year.

Landmarks in the city include "Abraham's well", a well dating to at least the 12th century CE (now inside a visitors center), and the old Turkish railway station, now the focus of development plans. The Artists House of the Negev, in a Mandate-era building, showcases artwork connected in some way to the Negev.

The Negev Museum of Art reopened in 2004 in the Ottoman Governor's House, and an art and media center for young people was established in the Old City.

In 2009, a new tourist and information center, Gateway to the Negev, was built.

In 2024, Midbarium, a desert zoo and amusement park was opened, replacing the NegevZoo.

=== Great Mosque of Beersheba ===
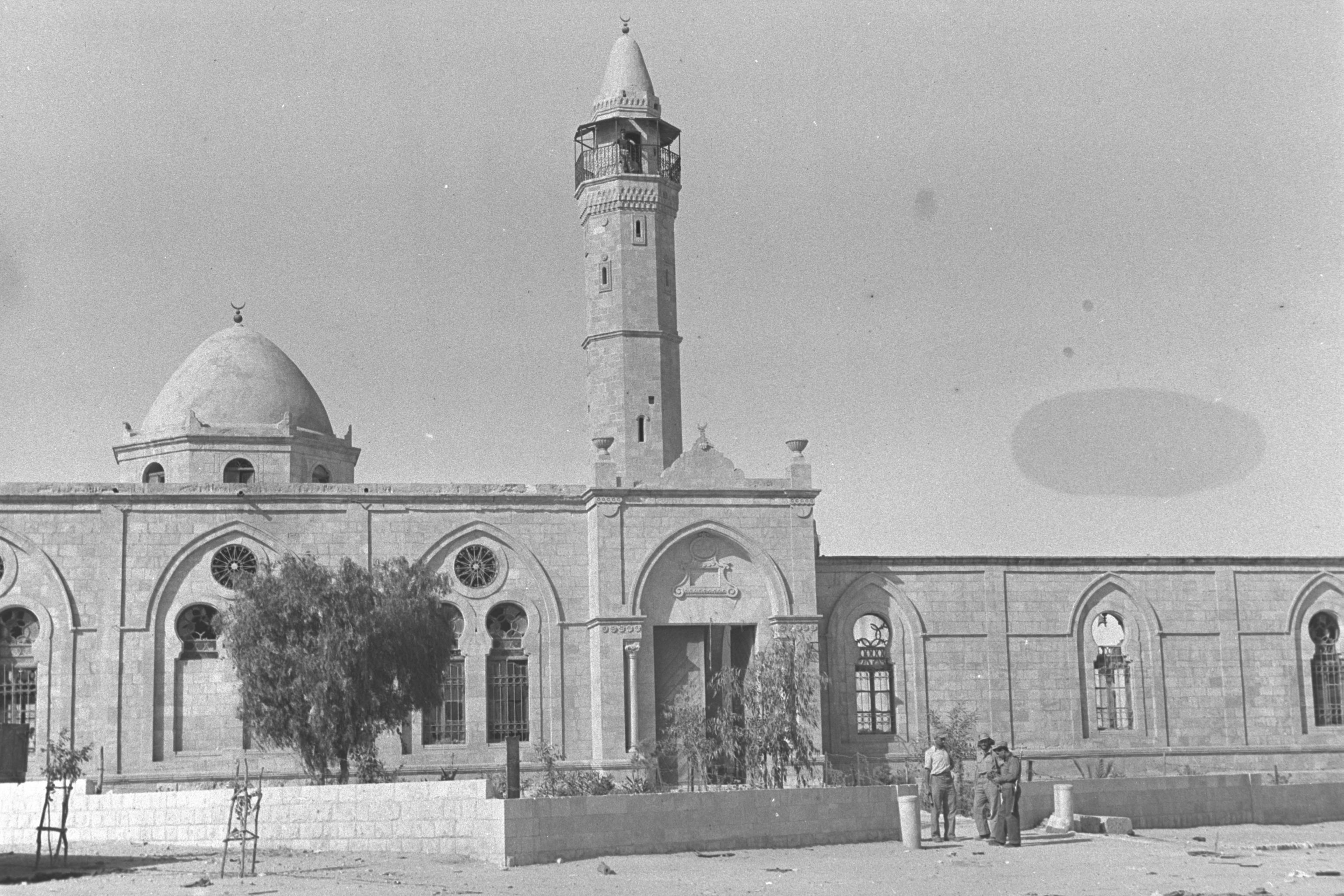
The Great Mosque of Beersheba in 1948

In 1906, during the Ottoman era, the Great Mosque of Beersheba was built with donations collected from the Bedouin residents in the Negev. It was used actively as a mosque until the city fell to Israeli forces in 1948. The mosque was used until 1953 as the city's courthouse. From then until the 1990s, when it was closed for renovations, the building housed an archeological museum, which the city intended to turn into the archeological branch of the Negev Museum. In 2011, however, the Supreme Court of Israel, sitting as the High Court of Justice, ordered the property to be turned into a museum of Islam without reverting to a place of worship.

== Transportation ==
Beersheba is the central transport hub of southern Israel, served by roads, railways and air. Beersheba is connected to Tel Aviv via Highway 40, the second longest highway in Israel, which passes to the east of the city and is called the Beersheba bypass because it allows travellers from the north to go to southern locations, avoiding the more congested city center. From west to east, the city is divided by Highway 25, which connects to Ashkelon and the Gaza Strip to the northwest, and Dimona to the east. Finally, Highway 60 connects Beersheba with Jerusalem and the Shoket Junction, and goes through the West Bank. On the local level, a partial ring road surrounds the city from the north and east, and Road 406 (Rager Blvd.) goes through the city center from north to south.

Metrodan Beersheba, established in 2003, had a fleet of 90 buses and operates 19 lines in the city between 2003 and 2016, most of which depart from the Beersheba Central Bus Station. These lines were formerly operated by the municipality as the 'Be'er Sheva Urban Bus Services'. Inter-city buses to and from Beersheba are operated by Egged, Dan BaDarom and Metropoline. The intercity bus service was transferred to Dan Be'er Sheva on 25 November 2016 and Metrodan Beersheva had been shut down. With the change to Dan Be'er Sheva the company introduced electronic payment stopping pay at the driver which was common in Beersheba.

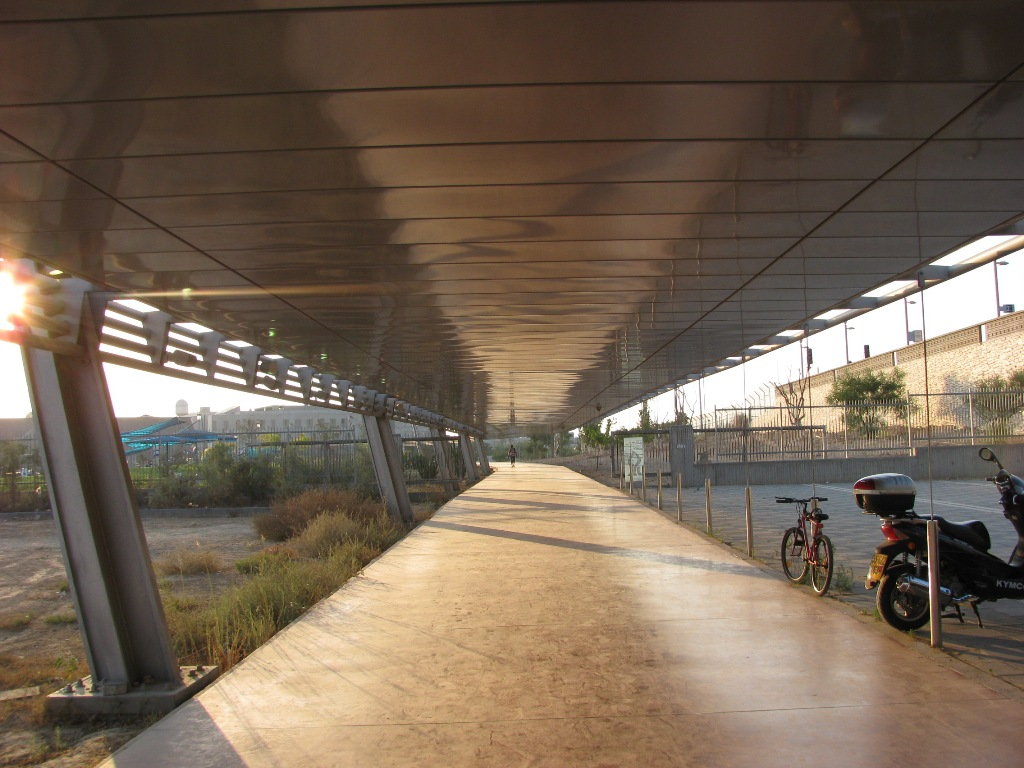
Mexico Bridge from railway station to Ben-Gurion University

Israel Railways operates two stations in the city that form part of the railway to Beersheba: the old Be'er Sheva North University station, adjacent to Ben Gurion University and Soroka Medical Center, and the new Be'er Sheva Central station, adjacent to the central bus station. Between the two stations, the railway splits into two, and also continues to Dimona and the Dead Sea factories. An extension is planned to Eilat and Arad.

The Be'er Sheva North University station is the terminus of the line to Dimona. All stations of Israel Railways can be accessed from Beersheba using transfer stations in Tel Aviv and Lod. Until 2012, the railway line to Beersheba used a slow single-track configuration with sharp curves and many level crossings which limited train speed. Between 2004 and 2012 the line was double tracked and rebuilt using an improved alignment and all its level crossings were grade separated. The rebuilding effort cost NIS 2.8 billion and significantly reduced the travel time and greatly increased the train frequency to and from Tel Aviv and Kiryat Motzkin to Beersheba. In addition, Beersheba will be linked to Tel Aviv and Eilat by a new passenger and freight high-speed railway system.

The Beersheba Light Rail is currently planned as a light rail system for the city of Beersheba and outlying communities. There have been plans for a light rail system in Beersheba for many years, and a light rail system appears in the master plan for the city. An agreement was signed for the construction of a light rail system in 1998, but was not implemented. In 2008, the Israeli Finance Ministry contemplated freezing the Tel Aviv Light Rail project and building a light rail system in Beersheba instead, but that did not happen. In 2014, mayor Ruvik Danilovich announced that the light rail system will be built in the city. In 2017, the Ministry of Transport gave the Beersheba municipality approval to proceed with preliminary planning on a light rail system. In August 2023, the light rail was officially approved. It is expected to be completed by 2033.

=== Roundabouts ===
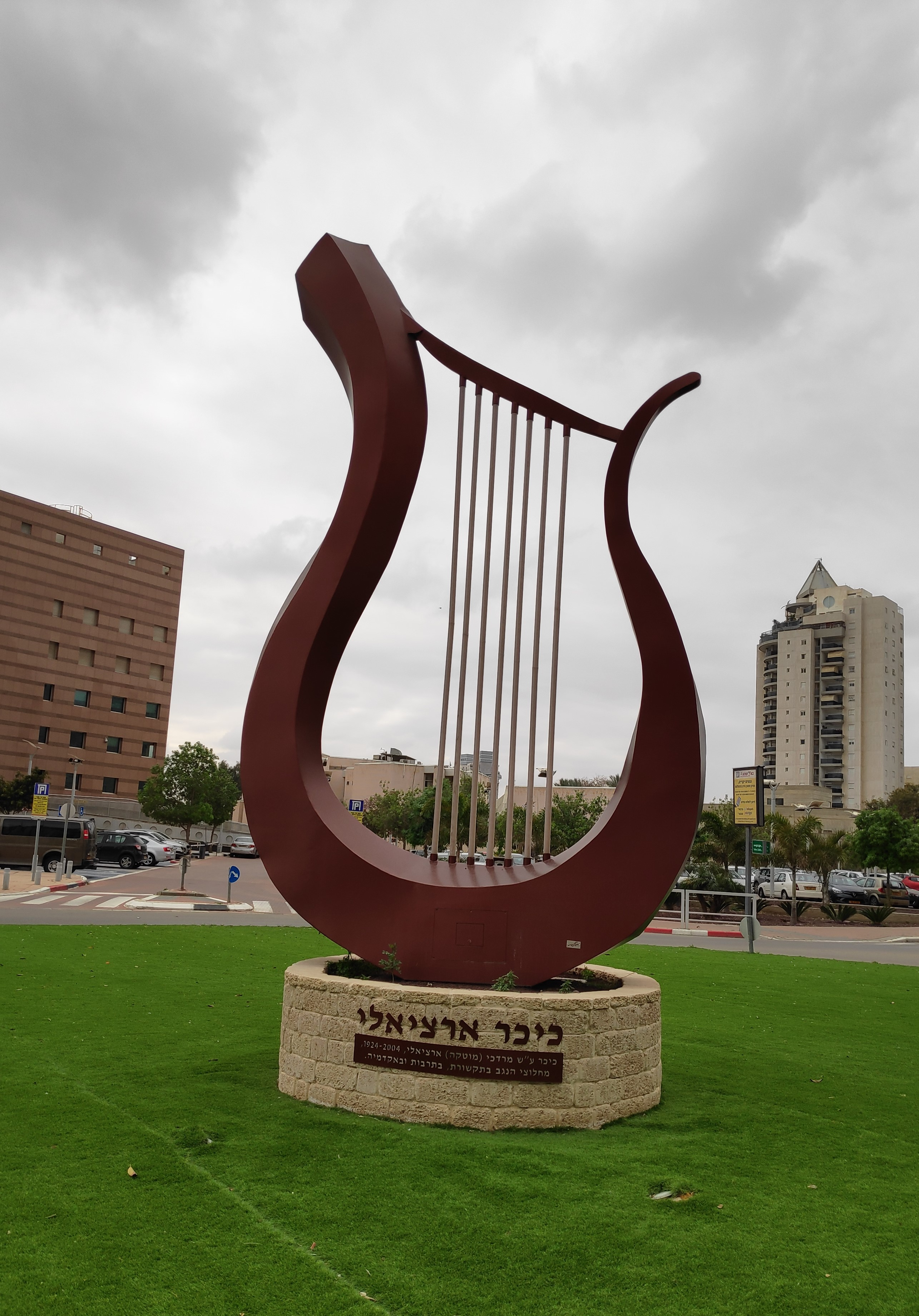
Harp statue, Artzieli Square, 2019

In Be'er Sheva, there are over 250 roundabouts, giving the city its nickname of "Roundabout Capital of Israel". Many roundabouts, part of Be'er-Sheva's urban oasis project, include fountains, landscaping and sculptures by well-known artists (such as Menashe Kadishman's The Horse Circle and Jeremy Langford's The Drip Circle). Some commemorate famous people and international and local organizations, or mark important events. Some are named after the twin cities of Beer Sheva.

Well-known roundabouts are: Ilan Ramon Circle, Phantom Circle near the Air Force Technical School, Champions Square near Turner Stadium and Conch Arena, Chess Circle, Harp Circle near the Municipal Conservatory and the Be'er-Sheva Performing Arts Center, College Circle, Ben Gurion Circle, Light Circle, Freemasons Circle, Shofarot Circle, Twin Towers Circle.

=== Hiking ===
Beersheba is linked to Hilvan by the Abraham Path.

== Sports ==
Hapoel Be'er Sheva plays in the Israeli Premier League, the top tier of Israeli football, having been promoted in the 2008–2009 Liga Leumit season. The club has won the Israeli championship five times, in 1975, 1976, 2016, 2017 and 2018, as well as the State Cup in 1997, 2020 and 2022. Beersheba has two other local clubs, Maccabi Be'er Sheva (based in Neve Noy) and F.C. Be'er Sheva (based in the north of Dalet), a continuation of the defunct Beitar Avraham Be'er Sheva. Hapoel play at the Turner Stadium.

Beersheba has a basketball club, Hapoel Be'er Sheva. The team plays at The Conch Arena, which seats 3,000.

Beersheba has become Israel's national chess center; thanks to Soviet immigration, it is home to the largest number of chess grandmasters of any city in the world. The city hosted the World Team Chess Championship in 2005, and chess is taught in the city's kindergartens. The Israeli chess team won the silver medal at the 2008 Chess Olympiad and the bronze at the 2010 Olympiad. The chess club was founded in 1973 by Eliyahu Levant, who served as its director for the next 40 years.

The city has the second largest wrestling center (AMI wrestling school) in Israel. The center is run by Leonid Shulman and has approximately 2,000 students, most of whom are from Russian immigrant families since the origins of the club are in the Nahal Beka immigrant absorption center. Maccabi Be'er Sheva has a freestyle wrestling team, whilst Hapoel Be'er Sheva has a Greco-Roman wrestling team. In the 2010 World Wrestling Championships, AMI students won five medals. Cricket is played under the auspices of Israel Cricket Association. Beersheba is also home to a rugby team, whose senior and youth squads have won several national titles (including the recent Senior National League 2004–2005 championship). Beersheba's tennis center, which opened in 1991, features eight lighted courts, and the Beersheba (Teyman) airfield is used for gliding.

== Environmental awards ==
In 2012, the Beersheba "ring trail", a 42-kilometer hiking trail around the city, won third place in the annual environmental competition of the European Travelers Association.

== Voting patterns ==
In the 2022 election, 66 percent of voters in Beersheba voted for the parties of the right-wing coalition led by Benjamin Netanyahu, while 30 percent voted for the parties of the center-left coalition led by Yair Lapid and 1 percent voted for the Arab parties.

In the 2026 election, 60 percent of voters in Beersheba voted for the parties of the right-wing coalition led by Benjamin Netanyahu, while 32 percent voted for the parties of the center-left coalition led by Gadi Eisenkot and 1.6 percent voted for the Arab parties. An additional 3.4 percent voted for the Reservists, and 1.8 percent voted for Amcha Yisrael. Voter turnout increased 14 percent from the 2022 election.

== Notable people ==
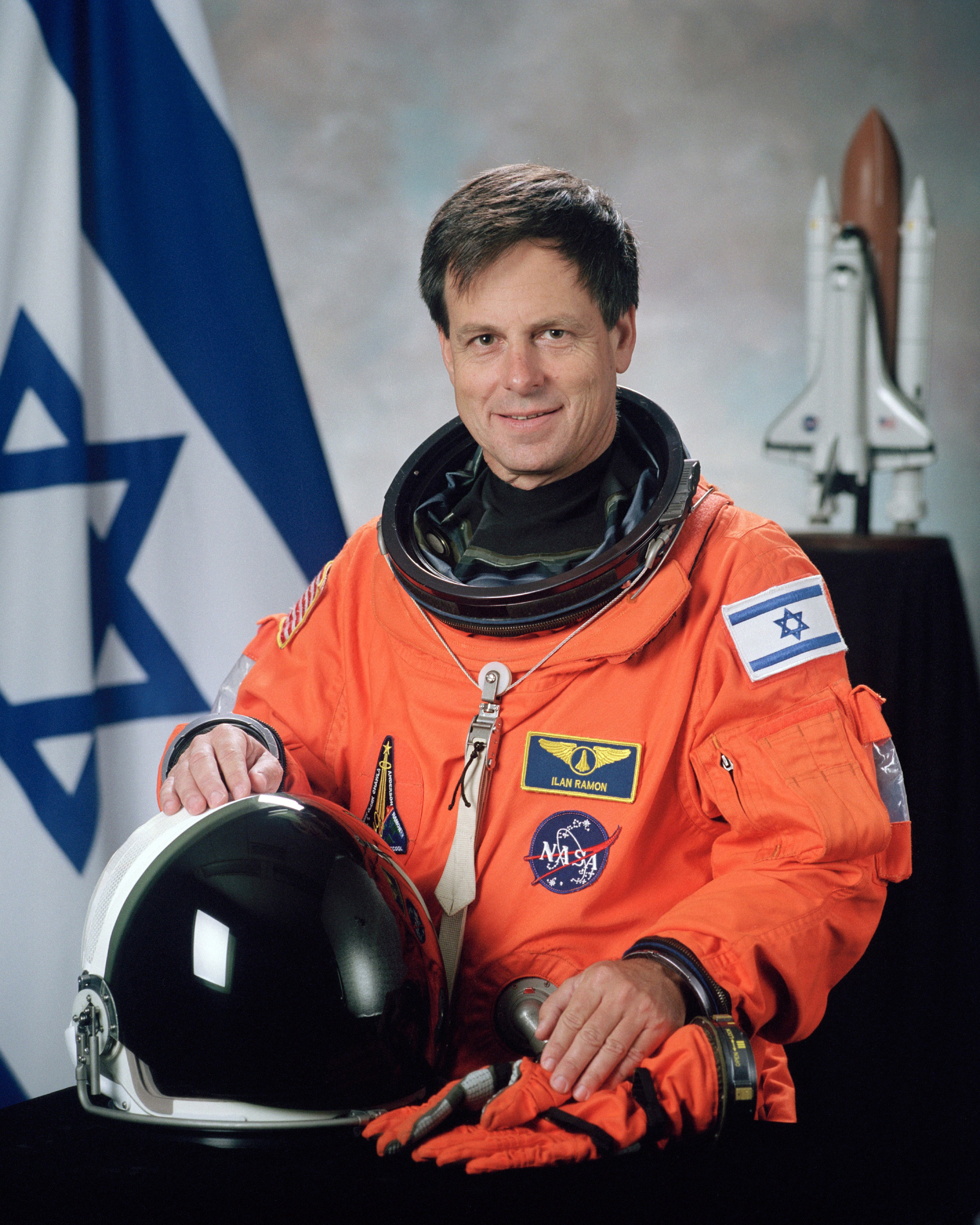
Ilan Ramon

- Orna Banai (born 1966), actress, comedian, and entertainer
- Elyaniv Barda (born 1981), footballer
- Zehava Ben (born 1968), singer
- Avishay Braverman (born 1948), professor and politician, president of the Ben-Gurion University of the Negev
- Almog Cohen (born 1988), footballer
- Ruvik Danilovich (born 1971), 8th mayor of Be'er Sheva
- Anat Draigor (born 1960), basketball player
- Eli Alaluf (born 1945), politician
- Ronit Elkabetz (1964–2016), actress
- Velvl Greene (1928–2011), Canadian–American–Israeli scientist and academic
- Zvika Hadar (born 1966), comedian and show host
- Boaz Huss (born 1959), professor of Kabbalah at Ben-Gurion University of the Negev
- Ron Kaplan (born 1970), Olympic gymnast
- Victor Mikhalevski (born 1972), chess grandmaster
- David Naccache (born 1967), cryptologist, professor at France's Ecole normale supérieure
- David Newman (born 1956), professor and Dean of Social Science and Humanities, BGU
- Ilan Ramon (1954–2003), Israel's first astronaut; died in the Columbia disaster
- Yehudit Ravitz (born 1956), singer
- Max Steinberg (1989–2014), American-Israeli IDF lone soldier killed in the 2014 Gaza War
- Idan Tal (born 1975), footballer
- Eli Zizov (born 1991), footballer
- Ze'ev Zrizi (1916–2011), second mayor of Beersheba
- Vince Offer (born 1964), infomercial pitchman, screenwriter, actor and director

== Twin towns – sister cities ==
Beersheba is twinned with:

- Adana, Turkey
- Addis Ababa, Ethiopia
- Cluj-Napoca, Romania
- Lyon, France
- Niš, Serbia
- (Georgia (country)) Oni, Georgia
- Parramatta, Australia
- La Plata, Argentina
- Seattle, United States
- Montreal, Canada
- Winnipeg, Canada
- Wuppertal, Germany
- Munich, Germany

== See also ==
- Battle of Beersheba (First World War)
- Beer Sheva Park, Seattle
- Map of Beersheba and surrounds in the 1940s and 1950s
- Beersheba Settlement

== Bibliography ==
- Fabri, Felix (1893). Felix Fabri (circa 1480–1483 A.D.) vol II, part II. Palestine Pilgrims' Text Society.
- Thareani-Sussely, Yifat (2007). "The 'Archaeology of the Days of Manasseh' Reconsidered in the Light of Evidence From The Beersheba Valley". Palestine Exploration Quarterly. 139 (2): 69–77. doi:10.1179/003103207x194091. S2CID 161326436.
