= Be'er Sheva Natural Region =

Coordinates: 31°14′38″N 34°47′36″E

- Natural Region
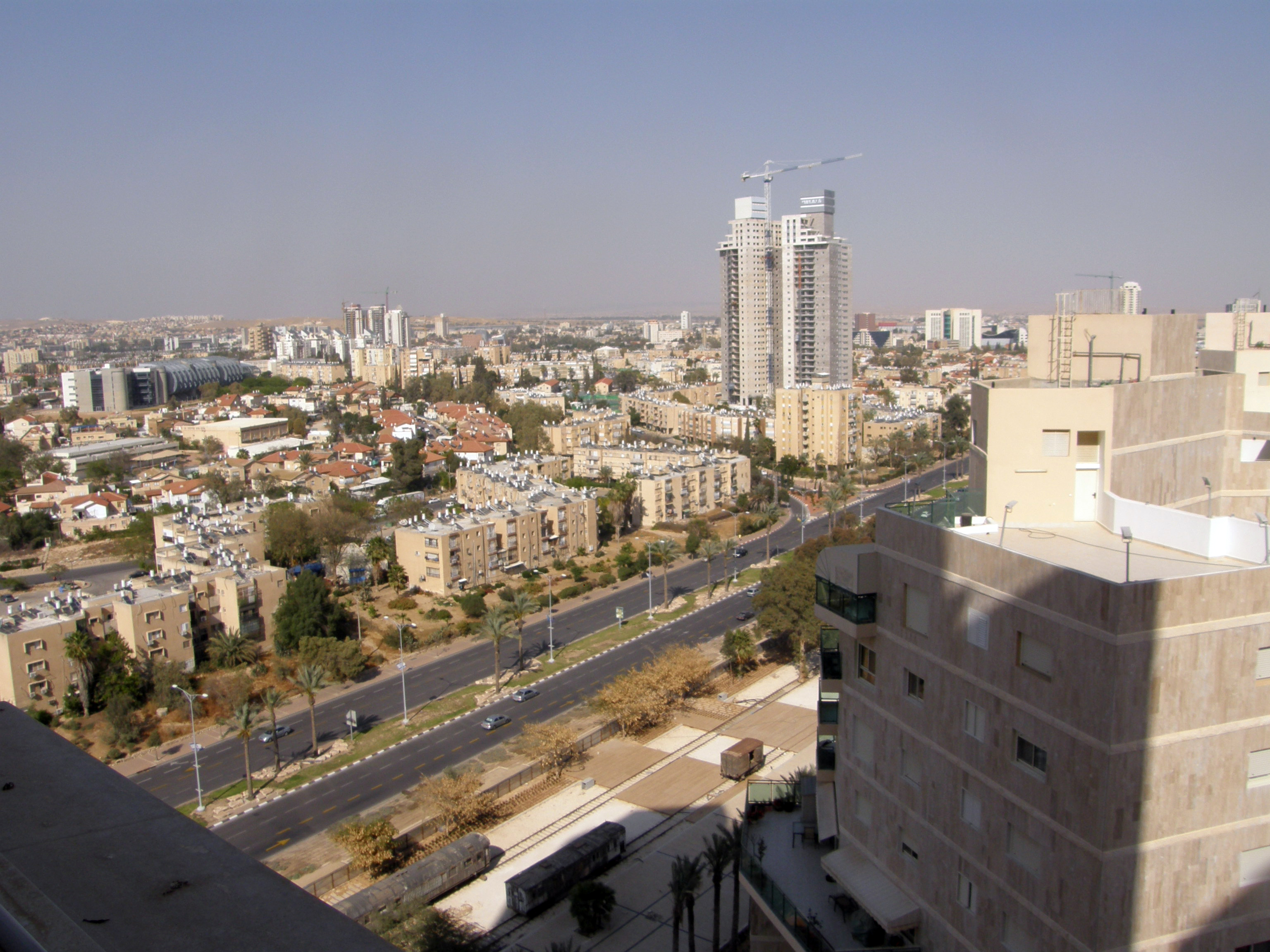
- View of Beersheba
- Country: Israel
- District: Southern
- Subdistrict: Beersheba
- Largest City: Beersheba

Area
  - Total: 2,002 km^{2} (773 sq mi)

Population (2024)
  - Total: 527,255 (Note: This statistic is incomplete, as it does not include Bedouins who lived in unrecognized villages.)

Ethnicity
  - Jews and others: 51.0%
  - Arabs: 47.7%

The Be'er Sheva Natural Region or Beersheba Natural Region is a natural region in the Beersheba Subdistrict, in the Southern District of Israel. Beersheba is the largest city in the natural region.

== Geography ==
Districts, Subdistricts and Natural Regions of the State of Israel, 2018

The natural region consists of a wide swath of southern Israel in the northern Negev Desert. It is adjacent to the West Bank. It has an area of 2,002 km^{2}. The largest city in the natural region is Beersheba, which contains roughly 40 percent of the natural region's population. Two other important cities in the natural region are Rahat, the largest Arab city in Israel, and Arad, the easternmost city in the natural region. The natural region contains the al-Kasom Regional Council along with portions of the Bnei Shimon, Neve Midbar, and Tamar regional councils.

== Demographics ==
The natural region has a population of at least 527,255 residents, making it by far the most populous natural region in the Southern District. This population figure does not include Bedouins who live in unrecognized villages, meaning that the actual resident population is higher. The natural region is roughly evenly divided between Jews and Arabs. The Jews live in Beersheba, Arad, the Beersheba suburbs of Lehavim, Meitar, and Omer, and the Bnei Shimon and Tamar regional councils. The Arabs, almost all of whom are Negev Bedouin, live in the seven official Bedouin cities (Rahat, Lakiya, Hura, Tel Sheva, Segev Shalom, Kuseife, and Ar'ara BaNegev), as well as the villages of the al-Kasom and Neve Midbar regional councils, and many more unrecognized villages scattered across the natural region.

Historical population
Year	Pop.	±%
1972	94,100	—
1983	127,900	+35.9%
1995	184,400	+44.2%
2008	404,970	+119.6%
2022	564,047	+39.3%
2024	527,255	−6.5%

== Administrative local authorities ==
Cities	Local Councils	Villages
Arad; Beersheba; Rahat	Ar'ara BaNegev; Hura; Kuseife; Lakiya; Lehavim; Meitar; Omer; Segev Shalom; Tel Sheva	al-Kasom: al-Sayyid; Drijat; Kukhleh; Makhul; Mulada; Tirabin al-Sana; Umm Batin; Bnei Shimon: Dvir; Giv'ot Bar; Hatzerim; Kramim; Lahav; Nevatim; Shomria; Neve Midbar: Abu Qrenat; Abu Tulul; Qasr al-Sir; Tamar: Har Amasa; Other: Livne (partly, also partly in the West Bank); Mahane Yatir

== Voting Patterns ==
In the 2022 election, 40 percent of voters in the natural region voted for the parties of the right-wing coalition led by Benjamin Netanyahu, while 34 percent voted for the Arab parties and 24 percent voted for the parties of the center-left coalition led by Yair Lapid.

In the 2026 election, 48 percent of voters in the natural region voted for the Arab parties (mostly Ra'am), while 29 percent voted for the parties of the right-wing coalition led by Benjamin Netanyahu and 19 percent voted for the parties of the center-left coalition led by Gadi Eisenkot. An additional 1.8 percent voted for the Reservists, and 1 percent voted for Amcha Yisrael. Voter turnout increased 41 percent from the 2022 election.
