= Abu Basma Regional Council =

Coordinates: 31°15′28″N 34°58′26″E

An official symbol of Abu Basma Regional Council

The jurisdiction of Abu Basma Regional Council in south-central Israel

Abu Basma Regional Council (Hebrew: מועצה אזורית אבו בסמה, Moatza Ezorit Abu Basma, Arabic: مجلس إقليمي أبو بسمة, Majlis Iqlimi Abu Basma) was a regional council operating in 2003-2012 and covering several Bedouin villages in the northwestern Negev desert of Israel. Following the Minister of Interior decision on November 5, 2012, it was split into two newly created bodies: Neve Midbar Regional Council and al-Kasom Regional Council.

== List of communities ==
There were 11 recognized communities in the Abu Basma Regional Council, and their population is 30,000 residents. There were also approximately 50,000 “diaspora” Bedouins living in unrecognized villages outside the council's jurisdiction.

Recognised
- Abu Qrenat (Abu Quraynat)
- al-Sayyid
- Bir Hadaj
- Drijat (Durayjat)
- Makhul
- Mulada
- Qasr al-Sir
- Tirabin al-Sana
- Umm Batin
- Kukhleh (Abu Rubaiya)
- Abu Talul

Unrecognised
- al-Atrash
- al-Hawashla
- Bir Hil

== History ==
=== Legal background ===
Prior to the establishment of Israel, the Negev Bedouins were a semi-nomadic pastoralist society that had been through a process of sedentariness since the Ottoman rule of the region. During the British Mandate period, the administration did not provide a legal frame to justify and preserve lands’ ownership. In order to settle this issue, Israel's land policy was adapted to a large extent from the Ottoman land regulations of 1858 as the only preceding legal frame. Thus Israel nationalized most of the Negev lands using the state's land regulations from 1969 and designated most of it for military and national security purposes.

=== Sedentarization ===
The 1947 UN Partition Plan, which was accepted by the Jewish leaders, envisaged most of the Negev (including most of the Negev Bedouin territory) as part of the planned Jewish state. After the rejection of the UN plan by the united Arab nations, their subsequent declaration of war on Israel, and their eventual defeat in the 1948 Palestine war, the Negev became part of Israel and the Negev Bedouin became Israeli citizens.

The new Israeli government continued the policy of sedentarization of Negev Bedouins imposed by the Ottoman authorities in the early 20th century, mirroring developments in nearby Arab nations. Early stages of this process included regulation of previously open lands used for grazing and re-location of Bedouin tribes. In the decades after the war of independence, the Israeli government was concerned about the allegiance of the Negev Bedouin to the new State, and thus re-located two-thirds of the southern Bedouin population into a closed area under the authority of the IDF. This situation was maintained until the late 1970s.

Starting in the 1980s the civilian government took back control of the northern Negev Bedouin from the IDF and began to establish purpose-built townships specifically for Bedouins in order to sedentarize and urbanize them, and to allow for the provision of government services. The government promoted these towns as offering better living conditions, proper infrastructure and access to public services in health, education, and sanitation. The new development towns constructed by the state in the 1980s absorbed a large proportion of the Negev Bedouin population but were unable to handle the entire Bedouin population, and their later reputation for crime and poor economy, together with a cultural preference for rural life, caused many Israeli Bedouin to shun these towns in favour of rural villages unapproved by the State.

Today, the government estimates that about 60% of Bedouin citizens of Israel live in permanently planned towns, while the rest live in unrecognised villages spread throughout the Negev. These villages are considered illegal under Israeli law, and their legal status, coupled with their periodic demolition and evacuation by police, is the subject of considerable debate.

In 2003, the government decided to establish a new regional council, known as the Abu Basma Regional Council, in order to oversee the resettlement and development of Bedouin communities in the area around Be'er Sheva, Dimona, and Arad. This was coupled by the formal recognition of a number of existing Bedouin villages within the council in order to encourage Bedouin to move from other unrecognised / illegal villages elsewhere in the Negev.

=== Formation of the regional council ===
The council was formed as a result of Government Resolution 881 of 29 September 2003, known as the "Abu Basma Plan", which stated the need to establish seven new Bedouin settlements in the Negev. The council was established by the Interior Ministry on 28 January 2004. At the time, the regional council had a population of approximately 30,000 Bedouins and a total land area of 34,000 dunams, making it the most populous regional council in the Southern District but the smallest in jurisdiction.

=== Criticism ===
There was considerable controversy within the Bedouin community regarding the establishment of this council. The Regional Council of Unrecognized Villages (RCUV) argued that while the creation of the Abu Basma Regional Council involved the recognition of villages that were previously under threat of demolition, it has involved the renunciation of considerable swathes of village land claims in exchange. The RCUV was concerned that the creation of Abu Basma would set a precedent for the transformation of unrecognized villages into urban ghettos by limiting their boundaries to the area of habitation and zoning most Bedouin grazing grounds; this type of de jure recognition has not entailed the introduction of business districts or de facto recognition through equitable provision of education, health, transportation and municipal waste services long denied to, and demanded, by the Bedouin community. The RCUV also worried that, as the council covered the region with the largest population but the least jurisdiction, the Abu Basma council's delimitations would strangle future village development necessary to accommodate population growth. The RCUV instead recommended the recognition of all unrecognized villages and their land claims, since "the entire land under dispute is no more than 2% of the Negev lands. The Bedouins are more than 25% of the Negev population."

== Abu Basma Regional Council prior to its division ==
The last head of the council was Rahamim Yona, preceded by Amram Qalaji. The council had the highest rate of unemployment in Israel. A 2011 audit by State Comptroller Micha Lindenstrauss revealed failures of local authorities.

It is accepted to give all the newly established councils a four-year trial period before elections are held. According to the amendment to the Regional Councils’ Law passed in 2009, that period can be extended by the Interior Ministry indefinitely. Following a decision taken by the Knesset's Interior Committee in 2010 to force the government to present a detailed timeline for the council's development the date for the first elections in the Abu Basma Regional Council was set as 2012. But due to the unpreparedness and low level of municipal services eventually these elections were delayed once again and never took place since the regional council was split.

=== Education ===
In 2007, the council ran 24 elementary schools (21 based in temporary housing) and three high schools. Due to the shortage of high schools in their villages, students attended regional schools in Kuseife and Shaqib al-Salam. The dropout rate was 16%.

== See also ==
- Arab localities in Israel
