= Qasr al-Sir =

Qasr al-Sir: קסר א-סיר (Hebrew); قصر السر (Arabic)
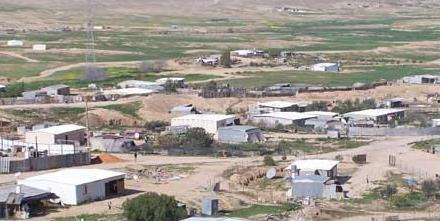
- Etymology: Fortress of Mystery
- Location within Northern Negev region of Israel Location within Israel
- Coordinates: 31°4′59″N 34°58′43″E
- Country: Israel
- District: Southern
- Subdistrict: Beersheba
- Council: Neve Midbar
- Founded: 2003
- Founder: Government of Israel
- Area: 4,776 dunams (4.776 km^{2}; 1.844 sq mi)
- Population (2024): 3,550
  - Density: 743/km^{2} (1,930/sq mi)

Qasr al-Sir (Arabic: قصر السر; Hebrew: קסר א-סיר, lit. 'Fortress of Mystery') is a Bedouin village in the Negev desert in southern Israel, adjacent to highway 25. The village covers 4,776 dunams (477.6 hectares). Located three kilometres west of Dimona, it falls under the jurisdiction of Neve Midbar Regional Council. In 2024 it had a population of 3,550.

== History ==
Prior to the establishment of Israel, the Negev Bedouins were a semi-nomadic society going through a process of sedentarization during the late Ottoman rule of the region. During the British Mandate period, the administration did not provide a legal frame to justify and preserve lands’ ownership. Thus Israel's land policy was adapted to a large extent from the Ottoman land regulations of 1858 as the only preceding legal frame. Israel has continued the policy of sedentarization of Negev Bedouins imposed by the Ottoman authorities, and at first it included regulation and re-location - during the 1950s Israel re-located two-thirds of the Negev Bedouins into an area that was under a martial law, nationalizing vacated Bedouin land.

Seven townships were built especially for Bedouins in order to sedentarize and urbanize them by offering them better life conditions, proper infrastructure and high quality public services in sanitation, health and education, and municipal services. All the more so the rate of the Bedouin population in Israel is among the highest in the world—it doubles its size every 15 years. These townships are: Hura, Lakiya, Ar'arat an-Naqab (Ar'ara BaNegev), Shaqib al-Salam (Segev Shalom), Tel as-Sabi (Tel-Sheva), Kuseife and the city of Rahat, the largest among them). These townships cannot resolve the issue of high population density and illegal construction in the Negev absolutely, so besides expanding existing towns, the Israeli government has decided to construct 13 additional settlements for the Negev Bedouin, and Qasr al-Sir is one of them.

Not all Bedouins agreed to move from tents and structures built on the state lands into apartments prepared for them. In permanent planned villages live about 60% of Bedouin citizens of Israel, while the rest live in illegal homes spread all over North Negev subject to demolition and lacking basic services as they refuse to move into the newly built townships with the full basic infrastructure.

After many years of unrecognized status, Qasr al-Sir was granted formal recognition by the State following Government Resolution 881 on 29 September 2003, which recognized eight previously illegal Bedouin settlements in the northern Negev. Installation of roads, water, sewage, and electricity to the town's homes has since been authorized by the government. Since previously the village was not officially recognized by the state, many homes are constructed of re-used scrap material and do not meet current Israeli building codes, so the village needs vast investment.

As of July 2013, the village is headed by Ibrahim al-Hawashla.

== Development plans ==
The al-Hawashla tribe in Qasr al-Sir is working together with a number of NGOs and government representatives in an attempt to produce a development plan that will avoid mistakes made with the resettlement of Bedouin families in previous decades and create a new model of desert sustainability. A specific goal is to help revive knowledge of the desert environment in a way that is compatible with sedentary agricultural life, as an alternative to the forced urbanization policy followed for Bedouin in Israel and neighboring countries. This will allow the Bedouin to become producers of local agricultural, food, and handicraft products, fostering closer integration with other Bedouin and Jewish communities in the Negev, and allow them to maintain their connection with the desert while incorporating the modern-day requirement for stationary life.

The first big project was the construction of a large community center, built using a combination of traditional and modern green methods. A group of the young men from the village took a course on green building methods. Bustan hopes to leverage the construction of the community center to develop other projects, including attracting solar energy companies to the village and setting up an indigenous tree nursery, run as a women's cooperative.

== Demography ==
The village is home (along with the adjacent unrecognised village of al-Hawashla) to the al-Hawashla tribe.

== Education and community projects ==
Some community projects have grown from these efforts.

- Amina and Thanawa al-Hawashla, Qasr al-Sir women are putting their traditional cooking skills into catering and promoting a revival of typical Bedouin fare.
- The EcoKhan project, aimed at supporting Bedouin self-determination, promoting Bedouin-Jewish co-existence, developing and demonstrating sustainable strategies for enhanced food security and environmental protection, and supporting the development of eco-tourism and small business opportunities in the Bedouin sector in Israel.

There are two elementary schools, one secondary school, several kindergartens and a youth center inside Qasr al-Sir. Also the village is situated in a close proximity to the town of Arad with its own school network. The nearest university, Ben-Gurion University of the Negev, is situated in Be'er Sheva.

== See also ==
- Arab localities in Israel
- Bedouin in Israel
- Negev Bedouin
- Sedentarization
- Dimona
