= Abu Talul =

Township in southern Israel

- non-Jewish locality

Other transcription(s)
  - Arabic: أبو تلول
  - Hebrew: אבו תלול
- Location within Northern Negev region of Israel
- Coordinates: 31°8′31″N 34°54′52″E
- Country: Israel
- District: Southern
- subdistrict: Beersheba
- council: Neve Midbar
- Founded: 2006

Area
  - Total: 11.5 km^{2} (4.4 sq mi)

Population (2024)
  - Total: 5,716

Abu Talul (Arabic: أبو تلول; Hebrew: אבו תלול) is a Bedouin township in southern Israel. Located in the Negev desert around ten kilometres east of Beersheba and to the south of highway 25, it falls under the jurisdiction of Neve Midbar Regional Council. In 2024 it had a population of 5,716.

== Demography ==
The township is populated by three large families; Abu Talul, Abu Sulab (Abu Silb) and el-Shihabi. There are also several thousand Bedouin living in the area outside of the organized township.

== History ==
Prior to the establishment of Israel, the Negev Bedouin were a semi-nomadic society going through a process of sedentarization since the Ottoman rule.

Abu Tulul was one of several townships built for the Bedouins in order to offer them proper infrastructure and public services in sanitation, health and education, and municipal services. The largest townships are: Hura, Lakiya, Ar'arat an-Naqab (Ar'ara BaNegev), Shaqib al-Salam (Segev Shalom), Tel as-Sabi (Tel-Sheva), Kuseife and the city of Rahat.

Started as an unrecognized Bedouin village, Abu Talul became an officially approved settlement with the implementation of the government Abu Basma plan. This was a plan to find an appropriate solution for scattered Bedouin communities living without official permits all over the Northern Negev. On February 19, 2006, Abu Talul was recognized officially by the state and became part of the Abu Basma Regional Council.

When the Abu Basma Regional Council was dismantled by the Israeli Ministry of Interior order on November 5, 2012 and two new regional councils were created instead, Abu Talul became a part of the Neve Midbar Regional Council.

== Infrastructure ==
In 2012, there were two school buildings, kindergartens, a medical clinic, a perinatal (baby) care center Tipat Halav, three mosques, a cemetery and a sports ground. Seven more public facilities were under construction.

In July 2013, the township had three operating elementary schools and one middle school attended by 2,400 pupils. There was also a high school attended by 120 students, half of them girls and half of them boys. Classes were held in a series of 12 caravans. Due to the traditional nature of Arab Bedouin society there was a high drop-out rate that was significantly higher among the girls. The nearest university is Ben-Gurion University of the Negev in Beersheba.

== Election Results ==
Nearly 85% of Abu Talul's eligible voters voted in the 2026 Israeli legislative election, higher than the 77.9% national turnout. The Islamist Ra'am party received about 92% of Abu Talul's votes.

== See also ==
- Arab localities in Israel
- Bedouin in Israel
