= Local council (Israel) =

Type of local government of Israel

Local councils (Hebrew plural: מוֹעָצוֹת מְקוֹמִיּוֹת, romanized: Mo'atzot Mekomiot; singular: מוֹעָצָה מְקוֹמִית Mo'atza Mekomit; Arabic plural: مجالس محليّة, romanized: Majalis Mahaliyya; singular: مجلس محلّي Majlis Mahallī) are one of the three types of local government found in Israel, the other two being cities and regional councils. There are 124 local councils in Israel, including 69 Arab local councils.

Local council status is determined by passing a minimum threshold: enough to justify operations as independent municipal units, although not of a scale large enough to be declared a city. In general this applies to all settlements of over 2,000 people.

The Israeli Interior Minister has the authority of to decide if a locality meets the requirements of a municipal council (a city). The minister then reviews the residents request, which may include the locality remaining a local council despite meeting the city status requirements (e.g., Ramat HaSharon, which did not become a city until 2002 due to its residents wanting to preserve its image as a small town), or becoming part of a regional council.

== History ==
The Union of Local Authorities in Israel (ULAI) is the umbrella organization of local councils which represents their collective interests vis-à-vis the national government. It traces its roots to the League of National Councils, which had been established in 1938 under the British Mandate.

== List of local councils ==
Local councils of Israel
Name	District	Subdistrict	Natural region	Population (2024)
Abu Ghosh	Jerusalem		Judean Mountains	8,847
Abu Snan	Northern	Acre	Nahariya	14,543
Alfei Menashe	Judea and Samaria			8,038
Ar'ara	Haifa	Hadera	Alexander Mountain	20,733
Ar'ara BaNegev	Southern	Beersheba	Be'er Sheva	21,259
Azor	Tel Aviv		Holon	13,067
Basma	Haifa	Hadera	Alexander Mountain	12,002
Basmat Tab'un	Northern	Jezreel	Nazareth-Tir'an Mountains	8,268
Beit Jann	Northern	Acre	Yehi'am	12,446
Bnei Ayish	Central	Rehovot	Rehovot	6,579
Beit Aryeh-Ofarim	Judea and Samaria			5,627
Beit Dagan	Central	Ramla	Ramla	7,727
Beit El	Judea and Samaria			6,359
Bi'ina	Northern	Acre	Karmiel	8,713
Binyamina-Giv'at Ada	Haifa	Hadera	Hadera	15,566
Bir al-Maksur	Northern	Acre	Shefar'am	11,068
Bu'eine Nujeidat	Northern	Jezreel	Nazareth-Tir'an Mountains	10,630
Buq'ata	Northern	Golan	Northern Golan	6,983
Daburiyya	Northern	Jezreel	Nazareth-Tir'an Mountains	10,830
Daliyat al-Karmel	Haifa	Haifa	Haifa	18,363
Deir al-Asad	Northern	Acre	Karmiel	12,620
Deir Hanna	Northern	Acre	Shefar'am	10,762
Efrat	Judea and Samaria			12,115
Eilabun	Northern	Kinneret	Eastern Lower Galilee	5,849
Ein Mahil	Northern	Jezreel	Nazareth-Tir'an Mountains	14,029
Ein Qiniyye	Northern	Golan	Hermon	2,470
Elkana	Judea and Samaria			4,493
Elyakhin	Central	HaSharon	Western Sharon	3,856
Even Yehuda	Central	HaSharon	Western Sharon	15,370
Fassuta	Northern	Acre	Elon	3,426
Fureidis	Haifa	Hadera	Karmel Coast	13,548
Gan Yavne	Central	Rehovot	Rehovot	25,144
Gedera	Central	Rehovot	Rehovot	31,389
Ghajar	Northern	Golan	Northern Golan	2,739
Giv'at Ze'ev	Judea and Samaria			25,105
Har Adar	Judea and Samaria			4,340
Hatzor HaGlilit	Northern	Safed	Hazor	11,013
Hura	Southern	Beersheba	Be'er Sheva	23,035
Hurfeish	Northern	Acre	Elon	6,876
I'billin	Northern	Acre	Shefar'am	13,634
Iksal	Northern	Jezreel	Nazareth-Tir'an Mountains	15,134
Ilut	Northern	Jezreel	Nazareth-Tir'an Mountains	9,077
Immanuel	Judea and Samaria			5,675
Isfiya	Haifa	Haifa	Haifa	13,403
Jadeidi-Makr	Northern	Acre	Akko	20,232
Jaljulia	Central	Petah Tikva	Southern Sharon	10,992
Jatt	Haifa	Hadera	Hadera	12,835
Jish	Northern	Safed	Eastern Upper Galilee	3,244
Jisr az-Zarqa	Haifa	Hadera	Hadera	15,823
Julis	Northern	Acre	Yehi'am	6,821
Ka'abiyye-Tabbash-Hajajre	Northern	Jezreel	Nazareth-Tir'an Mountains	6,545
Kabul	Northern	Acre	Shefar'am	12,589
Kadima-Zoran	Central	HaSharon	Western Sharon	22,655
Kafr Bara	Central	Petah Tikva	Petah Tikva	3,962
Kafr Kanna	Northern	Jezreel	Nazareth-Tir'an Mountains	25,375
Kafr Manda	Northern	Acre	Shefar'am	22,267
Kafr Qara	Haifa	Hadera	Alexander Mountain	21,067
Kafr Yasif	Northern	Acre	Nahariya	10,527
Karnei Shomron	Judea and Samaria			10,541
Katzrin	Northern	Golan	Middle Golan	8,012
Kaukab Abu al-Hija	Northern	Acre	Shefar'am	4,036
Kedumim	Judea and Samaria			4,564
Kfar Kama	Northern	Kinneret	Eastern Lower Galilee	3,545
Kfar Shmaryahu	Tel Aviv		Tel Aviv	1,981
Kfar Tavor	Northern	Kinneret	Eastern Lower Galilee	4,275
Kfar Vradim	Northern	Acre	Yehi'am	5,534
Kiryat Arba	Judea and Samaria			7,698
Kiryat Ekron	Central	Rehovot	Rehovot	11,283
Kiryat Tiv'on	Haifa	Haifa	Haifa	19,157
Kiryat Ye'arim	Jerusalem		Judean Mountains	7,839
Kisra-Sumei	Northern	Acre	Yehi'am	9,549
Kokhav Ya'ir–Tsur Yig'al	Central	Petah Tikva	Southern Sharon	9,007
Kuseife	Southern	Beersheba	Be'er Sheva	21,849
Lakiya	Southern	Beersheba	Be'er Sheva	19,361
Lehavim	Southern	Beersheba	Be'er Sheva	8,028
Ma'ale Efrayim	Judea and Samaria			1,748
Ma'ale Iron	Haifa	Hadera	Alexander Mountain	15,486
Majd al-Krum	Northern	Acre	Karmiel	15,429
Majdal Shams	Northern	Golan	Hermon	11,264
Mas'ade	Northern	Golan	Northern Golan	4,205
Mazkeret Batya	Central	Rehovot	Rehovot	16,334
Mazra'a	Northern	Acre	Nahariyya	3,922
Mashhad	Northern	Jezreel	Nazareth-Tir'an Mountains	8,822
Meitar	Southern	Beersheba	Be'er Sheva	11,609
Metula	Northern	Safed	Hula Valley	2,248
Mevaseret Zion	Jerusalem		Judean Mountains	26,534
Migdal	Northern	Kinneret	Kinerot	2,161
Mi'ilya	Northern	Acre	Yehi'am	3,323
Mitzpe Ramon	Southern	Beersheba	Northern Negev Mountains	5,842
Nahf	Northern	Acre	Karmiel	13,996
Omer	Southern	Beersheba	Be'er Sheva	8,077
Oranit	Judea and Samaria			10,088
Pardes Hanna-Karkur	Haifa	Hadera	Hadera	46,601
Pardesiya	Central	HaSharon	Western Sharon	7,972
Peki'in	Northern	Acre	Yehi'am	6,114
Ramat Yishai	Northern	Jezreel	Yokneam	7,953
Rameh	Northern	Acre	Karmiel	8,406
Reineh	Northern	Jezreel	Nazareth-Tir'an Mountains	20,654
Rekhasim	Haifa	Haifa	Haifa	15,087
Rosh Pinna	Northern	Safed	Hazor	3,308
Sajur	Northern	Acre	Karmiel	4,304
Savyon	Central	Petah Tikva	Petah Tikva	4,404
Segev Shalom	Southern	Beersheba	Be'er Sheva	16,736
Sha'ab	Northern	Acre	Shefar'am	7,790
Sha'ar Shomron	Judea and Samaria			8,836
Shibli-Umm al-Ghanam	Northern	Jezreel	Nazareth-Tir'an Mountains	6,476
Shlomi	Northern	Acre	Nahariya	8,226
Shoham	Central	Ramla	Ramla	23,592
Tel Mond	Central	HaSharon	Western Sharon	14,771
Tel Sheva	Southern	Beersheba	Be'er Sheva	24,781
Tuba-Zangariyye	Northern	Safed	Hazor	7,173
Tur'an	Northern	Jezreel	Nazareth-Tir'an Mountains	14,931
Tzur Hadassah	Jerusalem		Judean Mountains	10,458
Yafa an-Naseriyye	Northern	Jezreel	Nazareth-Tir'an Mountains	18,837
Yanuh-Jat	Northern	Acre	Yehi'am	6,890
Yarka	Northern	Acre	Yehi'am	16,823
Yavne'el	Northern	Kinneret	Eastern Lower Galilee	4,801
Yeruham	Southern	Beersheba	Northern Negev Mountains	11,989
Yesud HaMa'ala	Northern	Safed	Hula Valley	1,930
Zarzir	Northern	Jezreel	Nazareth-Tir'an Mountains	9,149
Zemer	Central	HaSharon	Eastern Sharon	7,953
Zikhron Ya'akov	Haifa	Hadera	Zikhron Ya'akov	24,200

== See also ==
- Regional council (Israel)
- City council (Israel)
- List of cities in Israel
