= Abu Qrenat =

Abu Qrenat: אבו קרינאת (Hebrew); ابو قرينات (Arabic)
- Location within Northern Negev region of Israel Location within Israel
- Coordinates: 31°6′7″N 34°57′11″E
- Country: Israel
- District: Southern
- Subdistrict: Beersheba
- Council: Neve Midbar
- Area: 7,320 dunams (7.32 km^{2}; 2.83 sq mi)
- Population (2024): 2,826
  - Density: 386/km^{2} (1,000/sq mi)

Abu Qrenat (Note: Common spellings include Abu Qrinat, Abu Karinat, and Abu Korinat.) is a Bedouin village in southern Israel. It's located in the Negev desert, south of Highway 25, between the village of Abu Talul to the west and the Al-Talma mountain ridge to the east. The village, named after the local Abu Qureinat tribe, was unrecognized by the Israeli government until 1999. Although officially recognized, it still lacks basic services such as paved roads, electricity, and clinics.

According to the Israel Central Bureau of Statistics, around 2,200 people live there, though local estimates suggest the population might be closer to 5,000. The village has faced home demolitions in recent years, like many nearby Bedouin communities. Archaeologists have also discovered ancient remains in the area, including pottery, buildings, and burial sites from periods such as the Byzantine, Early Muslim, and Ottoman eras.

== Status ==
Abu Qureinat is a Bedouin village in the Negev desert officially recognized by the Israeli government in 1999. The village is named after the Abu Qureinat tribe, who form the majority of its population. Despite being recognized, the village still lacks many basic services such as paved roads, healthcare clinics, water, and electricity. The living conditions remain poor and are similar to those in unrecognized Bedouin villages in the region. In 2015, residents and leaders from the village and other Bedouin communities marched to Jerusalem to protest the government's Prawer Plan, which aimed to relocate Bedouins from unrecognized villages to planned towns. Instead, they called for official recognition of all Bedouin villages and better support for their traditional pastoral lifestyle, which depends on agriculture and livestock.

Oren Yiftachel, a political geography professor at Ben-Gurion University in Beersheba, led the planning committee for the alternative recognition plan. He said the plan was developed in collaboration with local communities and based on Israeli rural planning standards, which he believes reduces costs compared to government proposals. The Joint List member MK Taleb Abu Arar noted that even recognized Bedouin villages like his hometown of ‘Arara continue to suffer neglect and underdevelopment compared to nearby Jewish communities.

It was also reported that in August 2023, Israeli forces demolished homes belonging to local Bedouin tribes. This demolition is part of an increased wave of home demolitions in the Negev region since late 2022, with over 2,000 demolitions recorded. These demolitions have been seen as part of efforts to forcibly displace Bedouin Arabs in the area.

== Geography ==
It is a village, sometimes referred to as a settlement, located south of Route 25, bordered by Abu Talul to the west and the Al-Talma (Rahma) mountain range to the east. According to the Neve Midbar Regional Council, the population is approximately 5,000. However, the Israel Central Bureau of Statistics reports a population of 2,826 as of 2024. In addition to the Abu Qureinat tribes, the village includes tribes such as Ibn Rashid and Al-Ghanami.

== Archaeology ==
A salvage excavation was conducted in August-September 2016 in the El-Ghanami neighborhood. The work, carried out ahead of planned development, was conducted by the Israel Antiquities Authority (IAA) and funded by the Negev Bedouin Settlement and Development Authority. The excavation covered about 1.5 square kilometers and uncovered 31 ancient structures and features. Most of them were poorly preserved, but they show signs of use from several periods, including the Iron Age, Second Temple period, Byzantine, Early Islamic, Mamluk, and Ottoman eras.

Main Discoveries:

- Corral 20: A rectangular stone enclosure with pottery dating to the Byzantine or Early Islamic periods.
- Residential Cave 39: A limestone cave with a niche, reused in modern times.
- Building 19: A small square stone building containing Ottoman-period pottery.
- Structure 47: Possibly an open mosque with a southern niche (mihrab), similar to a mosque found at Ramat Barnea.
- Tomb 50: A rock-cut tomb holding the skeleton of a woman, buried facing south, consistent with Muslim burial customs, along with a Mamluk-period potsherd.
- Water Systems: Several rock-cut cisterns and terraces designed for collecting runoff water, some still used today.
- Agricultural Features: Terrace walls, semicircular slope reinforcements, and dams indicating long-term farming activity.
- Pottery: Fragments from Byzantine, Islamic, Mamluk, and Ottoman periods.

== Election Results ==
Nearly 88% of eligible voters in Abu Qrenat voted in the 2026 Israeli legislative election, higher than the 77.9% national turnout. The Islamist Ra'am party received nearly 95% of Abu Qrenat's votes.

== See also ==
- Arab localities in Israel
- Unrecognized Bedouin villages in Israel
