= Bir Hadaj =

Bedouin agricultural town in southern Israel

Bir Hadaj: ביר הדאג' (Hebrew); بئر هداج (Arabic)
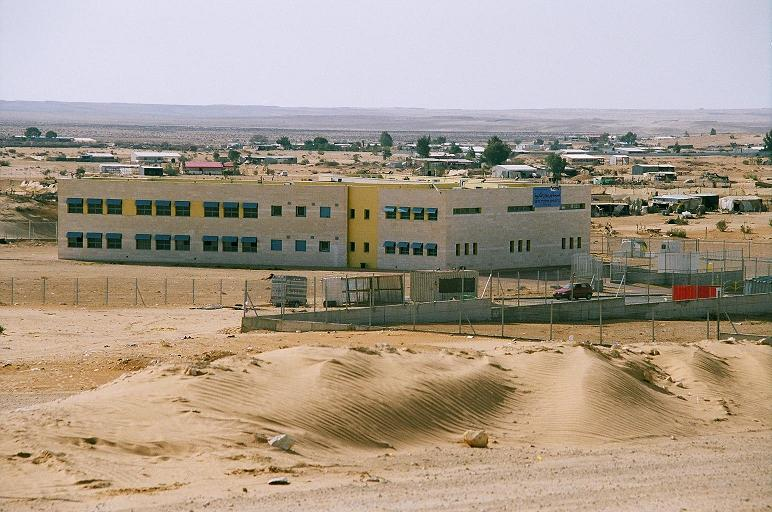
- ORT Bir Hadaj school

- Location within Northern Negev region of Israel
- Coordinates: 31°1′27″N 34°42′15″E
- Country: Israel
- District: Southern
- Subdistrict: Beersheba
- Council: Neve Midbar
- Area: 6,550 dunams (6.55 km^{2}; 2.53 sq mi)
- Population (2024): 2,899
  - Density: 443/km^{2} (1,150/sq mi)

Bir Hadaj (Arabic: بئر هداج; Hebrew: 'ביר הדאג) is a Bedouin agricultural town located in the Negev desert, near Revivim, Israel. In 2024 its population was 2,899.

== History ==
Prior to the establishment of Israel, the Negev Bedouins were a semi-nomadic society going through a process of sedentarisation since the Ottoman rule of the region. During the British Mandate period, the administration did not provide a legal framework to record land ownership in the region. Israel's property ownership policy was adapted to a large extent from the older Ottoman land regulations of 1858 as the only preceding legal frame. It enabled Israel to nationalize most of the Negev lands using the state’s land regulations from 1969. Israel has continued the policy of sedentarization of the Bedouin, which at first stipulated the regulation and re-location of the Negev's inhabitants; during the 1950s Israel has re-located two-thirds of the Negev Bedouin into an area that was under a martial law.

In 1978 Bir Hadaj was declared a closed military area, forcing its inhabitants to relocate to Wadi al-Na'am, near Beersheba. According to the NGO Arab Association for Human Rights, the inhabitants of Bir Hadaj remained there until 1994, when they learned that land where they previously settled was no longer used for military purposes, but was converted into a farm. The group states that they were only able to re-build their village two kilometers north of its original location.

=== State recognition and reorganization ===
In January 2004 as a part of the government Abu Basma plan to find a solution to the scattered unrecognized Bedouin communities in the Negev, Bir Hadaj was officially recognized by the government as a Bedouin town and along with 8 other villages, it became part of the now defunct Abu Basma Regional Council. It was planned as a rural-agricultural village so when created, each local family was offered a free land lot (5 dunam) in the newly recognized town. They were provided with municipal services, such as water, electricity, sewage, schooling and health services.

According to Akiva Bigman of Mida magazine, as of 2012 (a decade after the approval of the outline plan), no family has purchased land and settled in accordance with Israeli law. Only about a quarter (1,200) of the 5,000 residents of Bir Hadaj are located within the outline plan, and none of them live in the plots allocated by the program. In addition, many of the residents live and build outside the village, in the Ramat Negev Regional Council, although the jurisdiction area of the village is entirely in the area of Neve Midbar regional council. According to David Cohen, a member of the committee of settlement arrangement policy in the Negev, the rest of the residents that live outside the city limits are in its surroundings, in an area that spans about 20,000 dunams. According to Nature and Parks Authority, the rapid spread of the settlement located along the northern boundary of the nature reserve Holot Mashavim, is threatening the existence of the reserve.

Not all Bedouins agree to move from tents and structures built on the state lands into apartments prepared for them. About 60% of Bedouin citizens live in permanent, planned villages, while the remainder live in homes considered by illegal by the state and are subject to demolition and an absence of basic services. According to the Israeli NGO Regavim, a part of the scattered Bedouin community of Bir-Hadaj has settled on 1,900 dunam (~470 acres) of private land owned by Jews and continue to settle outside the regulated community on Jewish-owned land.

== Demographics ==
Bir Hadaj is the largest town in the Neve Midbar Regional Council with a population of approximately 5,000 people and a total land area of 6,550 dunams. It is populated by al-Azzazma tribe.

== Education ==
There are 7 schools in Bir Hadaj, six of them elementary, including an ORT elementary school. There are additional schools for the children of different age in the nearby town of Revivim. The nearest university is Ben-Gurion University of the Negev in Be'er Sheva.

== Medical services ==
There is a branch of a health fund (medical clinic) Clalit in Bir Hadaj.

== See also ==
- Arab localities in Israel
- Bedouin in Israel
- Negev Bedouin
- Shaqib al-Salam
- Sedentarization
