= Makhul =

Village in southern Israel

Makhul: מַכְּחוּל (Hebrew); مكحول (Arabic)
- Location within Northern Negev region of Israel Location within Israel
- Coordinates: 31°17′19″N 35°4′33″E
- Country: Israel
- District: Southern
- Subdistrict: Beersheba
- Council: al-Kasom
- Founded: 2003
- Population (2024): 2,105

Makhul (Arabic: مكحول; Hebrew: מַכְּחוּל) is a Bedouin village in the Negev desert in southern Israel. Located near Tel Arad, it falls under the jurisdiction of al-Kasom Regional Council. In 2024 it had a population of 2,105.

== History ==
The village was established following Government Resolution 881 on 29 September 2003, which created eight new Bedouin settlements (seven of which were to be located in the now defunct Abu Basma Regional Council). After being named Mar'it (Hebrew: מרעית) during the planning states, the village's name was chosen by Bedouins, and is taken from the Cahol stream and Cahol ruins nearby.

== See also ==
- Bedouin in Israel
