= Har Adar =

Israeli settlement in the West Bank

Har Adar: הַר אֲדָר; هار أدار
- Local council (from 1995)
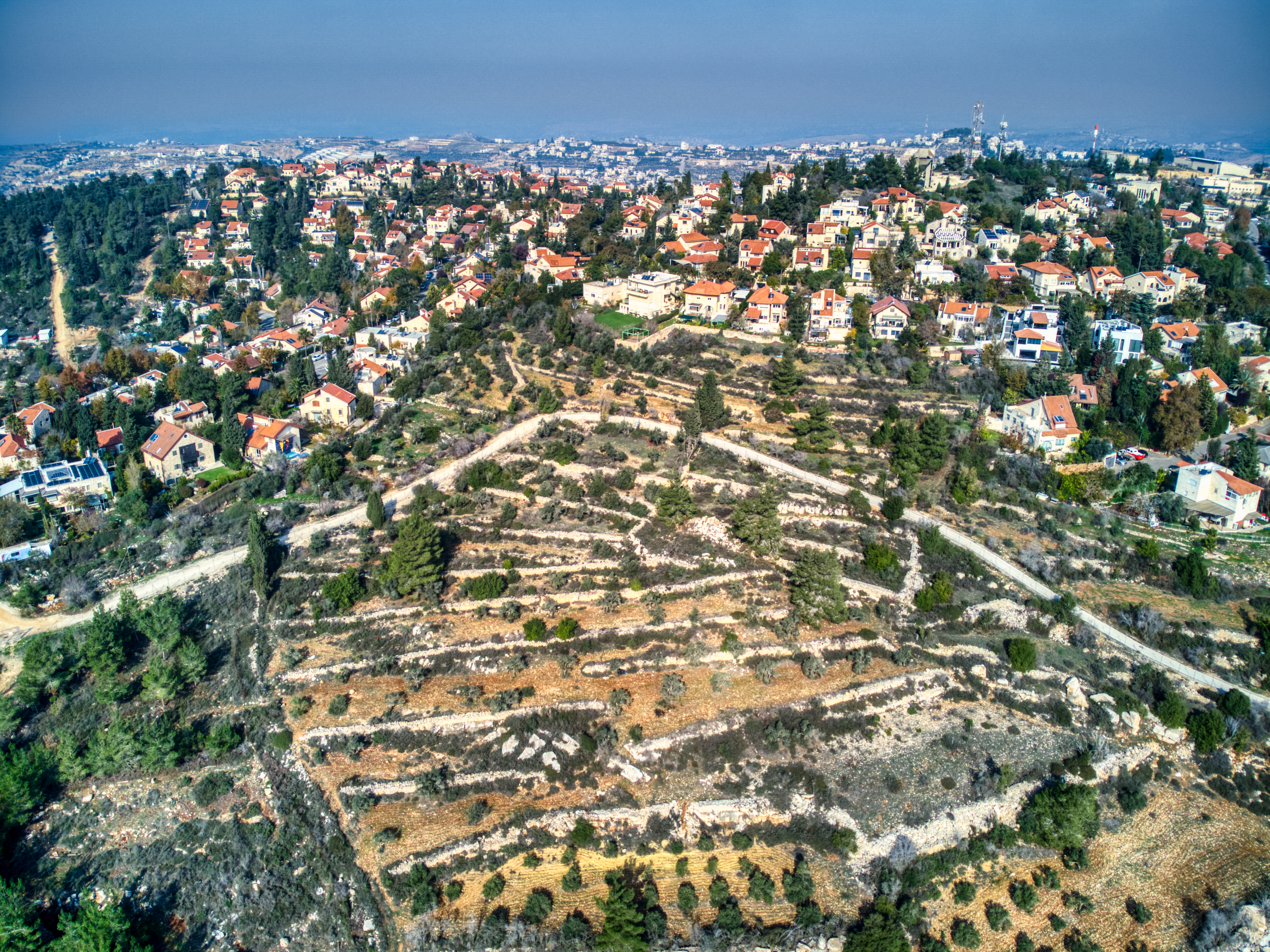

- Location within the West Bank
- Coordinates: 31°49′34″N 35°07′47″E
- Region: West Bank
- District: Judea and Samaria Area
- Governorate: Jerusalem Governorate
- Founded: 1982

Government
  - Head of Municipality: Hen Filipowicz (since 2013)

Area
  - Total: 994 dunams (99.4 ha; 246 acres)

Population (2024)
  - Total: 4,339
  - Density: 4,370/km^{2} (11,300/sq mi)
- Name meaning: Mount Adar

Har Adar (Hebrew: הַר אֲדָר) is an Israeli settlement organized as a local council in the Seam Zone and the Maccabim sub-region of the West Bank. Founded in 1986, it had a population of 4,339 in 2024. It is located near Abu Ghosh and the Green Line on Road 425, approximately 15 kilometers west of Jerusalem. Har Adar is ranked high on the Israeli socio-economic scale, at 9/10. Har Adar was initially built adjacent to the Green Line but is now largely located within the West Bank.

The international community considers Israeli settlements in the West Bank illegal under international law, but the Israeli government disputes this.

== History ==
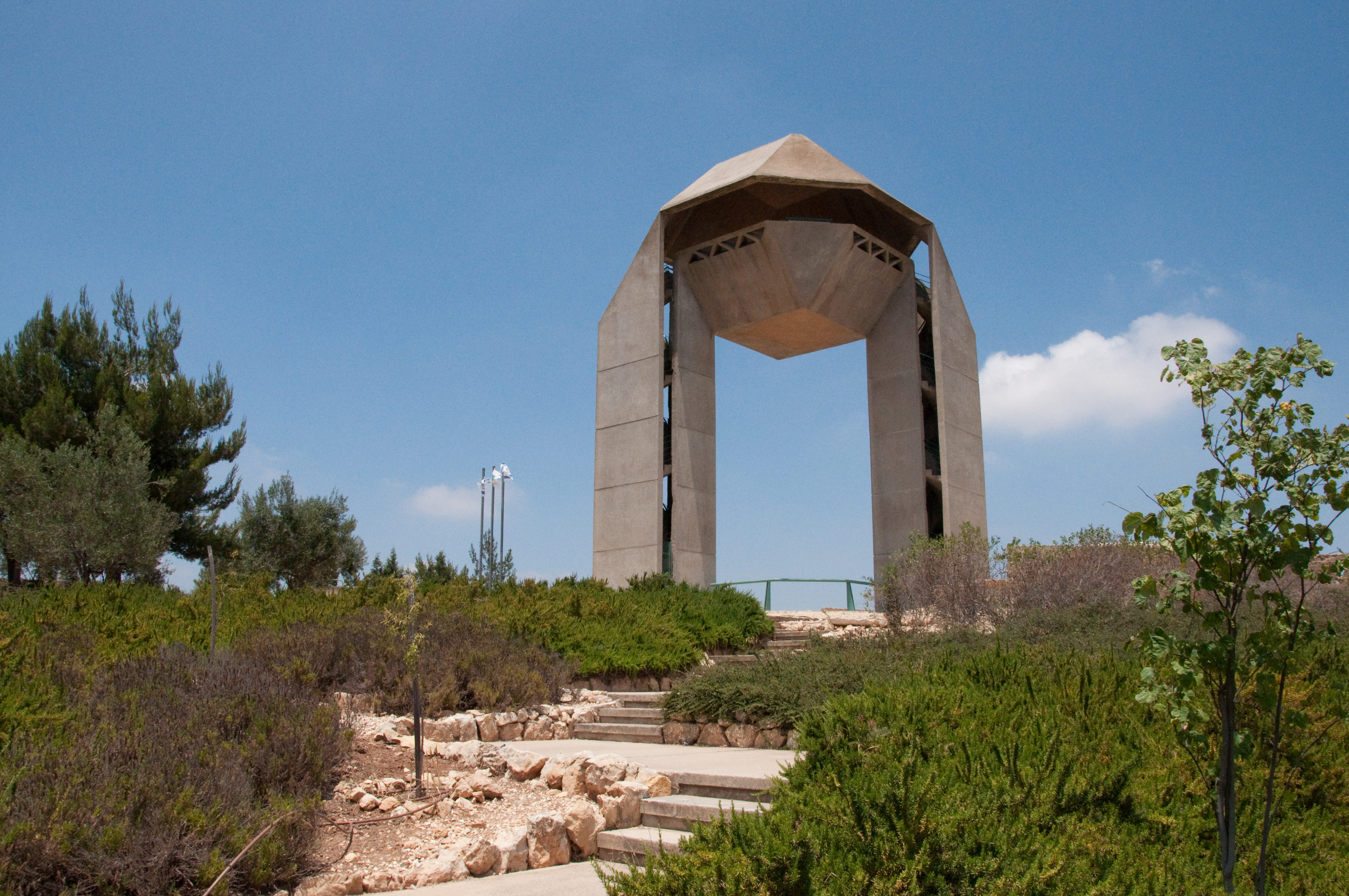
Harel Brigade memorial in Har Adar

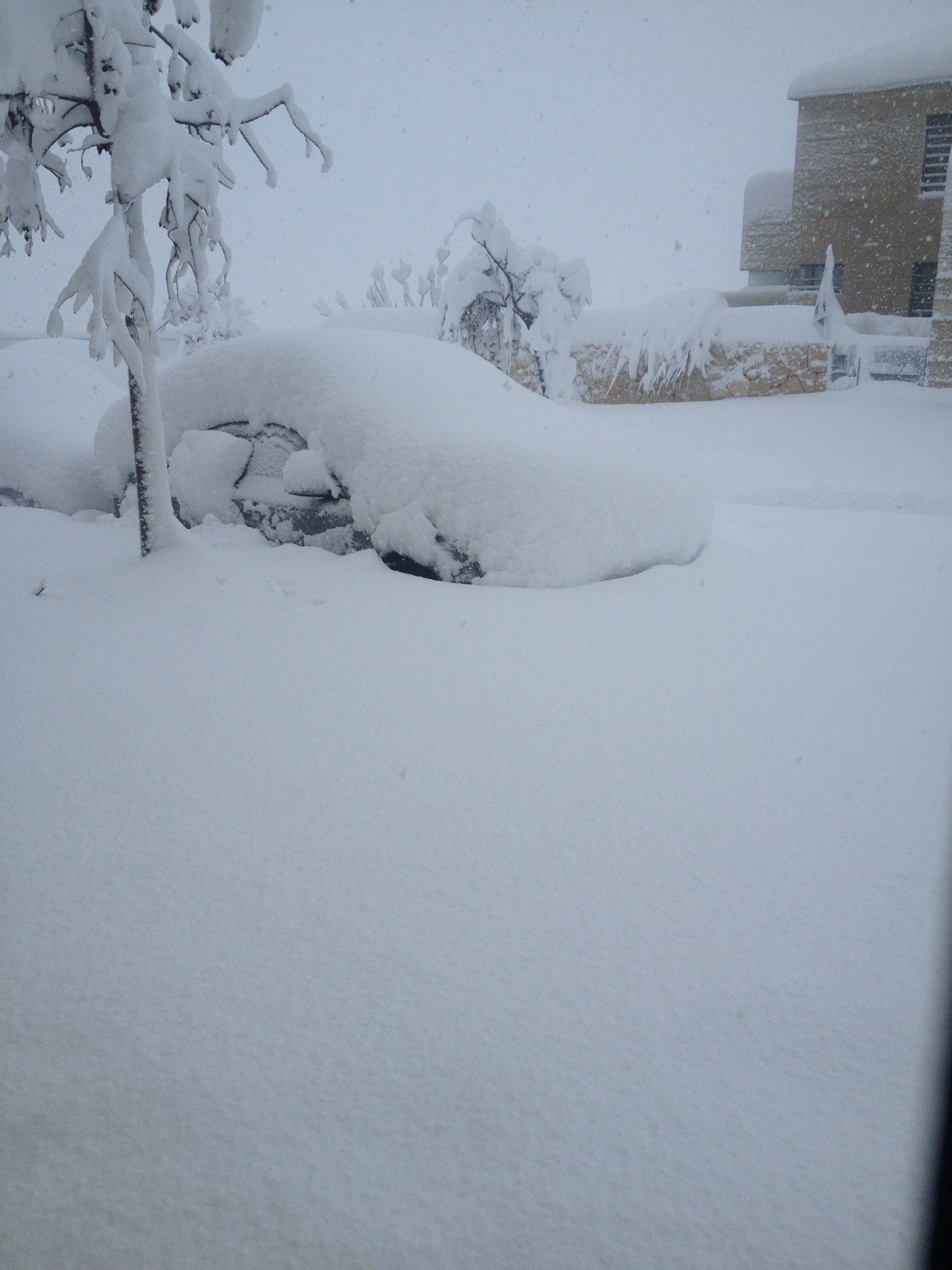
Snow-stranded automobiles in Har Adar, December 2013 during the 2013 Middle East cold snap

An antiquities site at Har Adar has been turned into a small archaeological park, based on finds from a salvage excavation conducted in 1991 on behalf of the Staff Officer for Archaeology, Judea and Samaria, directed by M. Dadon. A building complex was uncovered, with two strata, dating from the fifth to the mid-first centuries BCE, revealing a fort from the Persian period and a farmhouse from the Hellenistic period. In the Ottoman period a wing was added to the house. The location of Har Adar was named Radar Hill (Hebrew: גִּבְעַת הָרָדָאר, Giv'at HaRadar), for the World War II British military installation on top of the hill. The Local Jewish military thought that the installation was an anti-air radar for the protection of Jerusalem. In fact, it was a relay station, to boost the radio signal. The installation was handed over to the Jordanian Arab Legion on May 10, 1948, prior to the second phase of the 1948 Arab-Israeli War. 23 attempts by the Palmach's Harel Brigade to conquer it failed, although the Jewish force held the position for four days starting May 22, 1948. Being under Jordan rule after the 1949 Armistice Agreements, the area was annexed by Jordan in 1950. It was finally captured in the Six-Day War by the Harel Brigade. A monument for the fallen soldiers of the brigade with Bible citation from 2 Samuel 1:19 stands at the top of the town.

According to the ARIJ, Israeli authorities expropriated land from three Palestinian West Bank villages for the construction of Har Adar:

- 627 dunams from Biddu,
- 456 dunams from Beit Surik,
- 36 dunams from Qatanna.

On the morning of 26 September 2017, a Palestinian gunman opened fire at the checkpoint in the separation barrier at the rear of the settlement, killing one Border Police officer and two security guards, while wounding a fourth.

== Demographics ==
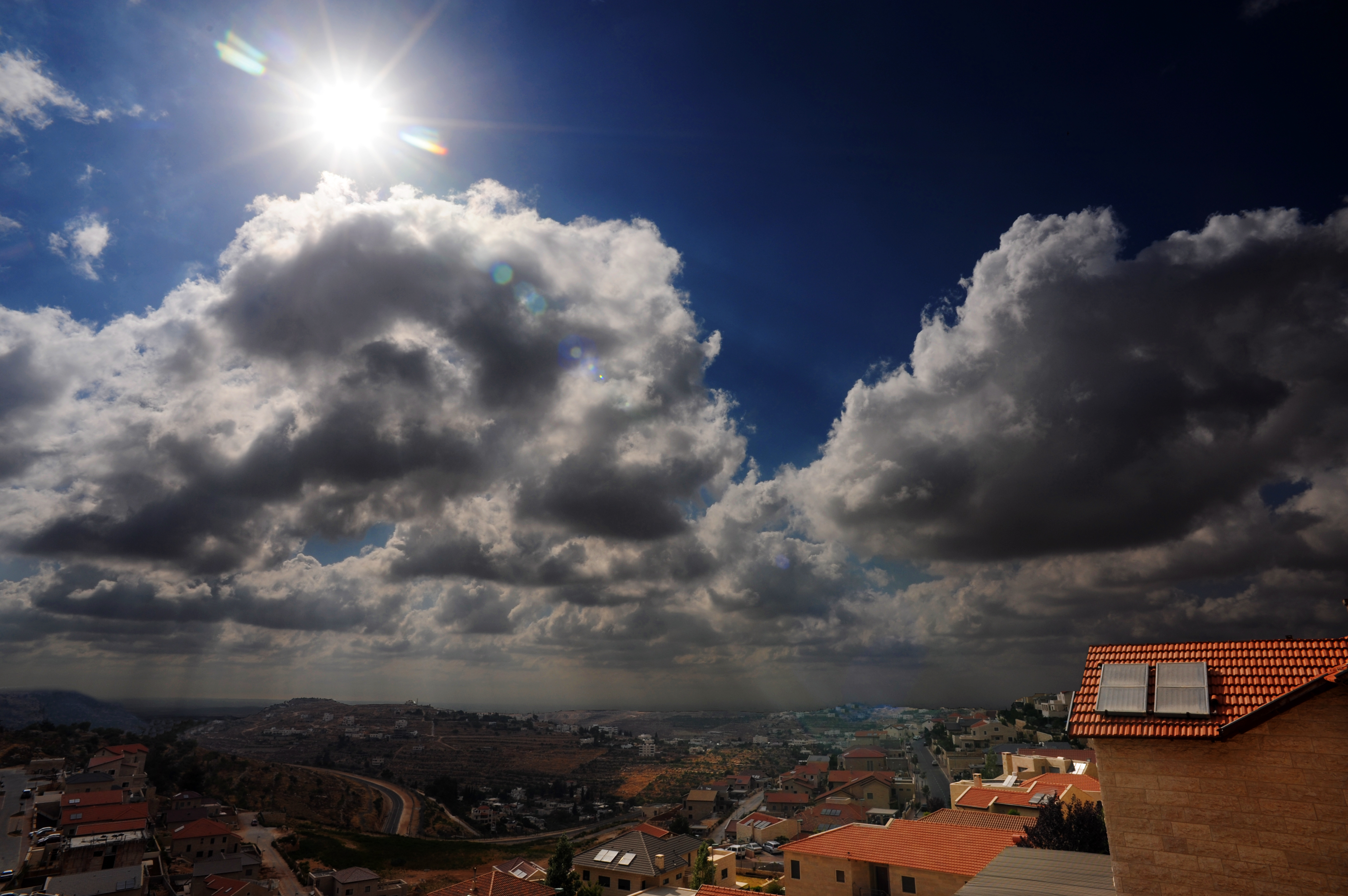
Westward view from Har Adar

In 2009, the population of Har Adar was 99.3% Jewish with 1,700 men and 1,600 women. The age distribution was as follows:

Age	0–4	5–9	10–14	15–19	20–29	30–44	45–59	60–64	65–74	75+
Percentage	9.6	10.3	9.8	8.0	12.4	20.3	17.6	6.7	4.4	0.9
Source: Israel Central Bureau of Statistics

== Economy ==
Har Adar is ranked 9/10 (high) on the Israeli socio-economic scale. According to Business Data Israel (BDI), in 2006 Har Adar had the most stable economy of all Israeli local councils, along with Kfar Shmaryahu. In 2009, the municipal surplus stood at NIS 187,000.

In 2009, there were 1,471 salaried workers in Har Adar. The average salary for males was NIS 15,987, and 8,882 for women – both higher than the national average. 25.5% salaried workers worked for minimum wage. In addition, there were 143 self-employed workers, with an average income of NIS 12,311.

== Voting Patterns ==
In the 2022 election, 68 percent of voters in Har Adar voted for the parties of the center-left coalition led by Yair Lapid, while 29 percent voted for the parties of the right-wing coalition led by Benjamin Netanyahu and 0.3 percent voted for the Arab parties.

In the 2026 election, 68 percent of voters in Har Adar voted for the parties of the center-left coalition led by Gadi Eisenkot, while 25 percent voted for the parties of the right-wing coalition led by Benjamin Netanyahu and 0.3 percent voted for the Arab parties. An additional 5.2 percent voted for the Reservists, and 1.9 percent voted for Amcha Yisrael. Voter turnout increased 10 percent from the 2022 election.
