= Kukhleh =

Village in southern Israel

Kukhleh: כוחלה (Hebrew); كحله (Arabic)
- Location within Northern Negev region of Israel Location within Israel
- Coordinates: 31.287°N 35.048°E
- Country: Israel
- District: Southern
- Subdistrict: Beersheba
- Council: al-Kasom
- Population (2024): 372

Kukhleh (Arabic: كحله; Hebrew: כוחלה) is a Negev Bedouin village in southern Israel. Located between the Bedouin towns of Hura and Kuseife, it falls under the jurisdiction of al-Kasom Regional Council. In 2024 it had a population of 372.

== See also ==
- Arab localities in Israel
- Bedouin in Israel
