= Mulada =

Village in southern Israel

Mulada: מולדה (Hebrew); مولدا (Arabic)
- Location within Northern Negev region of Israel Location within Israel
- Coordinates: 31°15′40″N 34°58′32″E
- Country: Israel
- District: Southern
- Subdistrict: Beersheba
- Council: Al-Kasom
- Founded: 2003
- Area: 11,000 dunams (11 km^{2}; 4.2 sq mi)
- Population (2024): 5,466
  - Density: 500/km^{2} (1,300/sq mi)

Mulada (Arabic: مولدا; Hebrew: מולדה), also known as Sa'wa (Hebrew: סעוה), is a Bedouin village in the Negev desert in southern Israel.

== History ==
The village was established following Government Resolution 881 on 29 September 2003, which created eight new Bedouin settlements (seven of which were to be located in the Abu Basma Regional Council).

The village covers 11,000 dunams (900 hectares) and is home to the al-Atrash and al-Hawashla tribes. It falls under the jurisdiction of Al-Kasom Regional Council. In 2024 it had a population of 5,466.

== See also ==
- Bedouin in Israel
