= Mahane Yatir =

Village in southern Israel

Mahane Yatir: מחנה יתיר (Hebrew)
- Location within Northern Negev region of Israel
- Coordinates: 31°20′52″N 35°03′38″E
- Country: Israel
- District: Southern
- Subdistrict: Beersheba
- Founded: 1979
- Founder: Gush Emunim
- Population (2024): 353

Mahane Yatir (Hebrew: מחנה יתיר, lit. 'Yatir Camp'), also known as Lev Yatir (Hebrew: לב יתיר, lit. 'Heart of Yatir'), is a village in the Yatir Forest in southern Israel. In 2024 it had a population of 353.

== History ==
The village was established in 1979 and was named after a biblical city (Joshua 15:48) in the allotment of the Tribe of Judah In 2008 a gar'in was formed to establish a new village, Hiran, in the area. In 2010 the group moved to Mahane Yatir in order to acclimatise to local conditions. In 2013 Mahane Yatir it was added to the Israel Central Bureau of Statistics list of localities.
