= Tel Sheva =

Bedouin town in southern Israel

Tel Sheva: תֵּל שֶׁבַע; تل السبع
- Local council
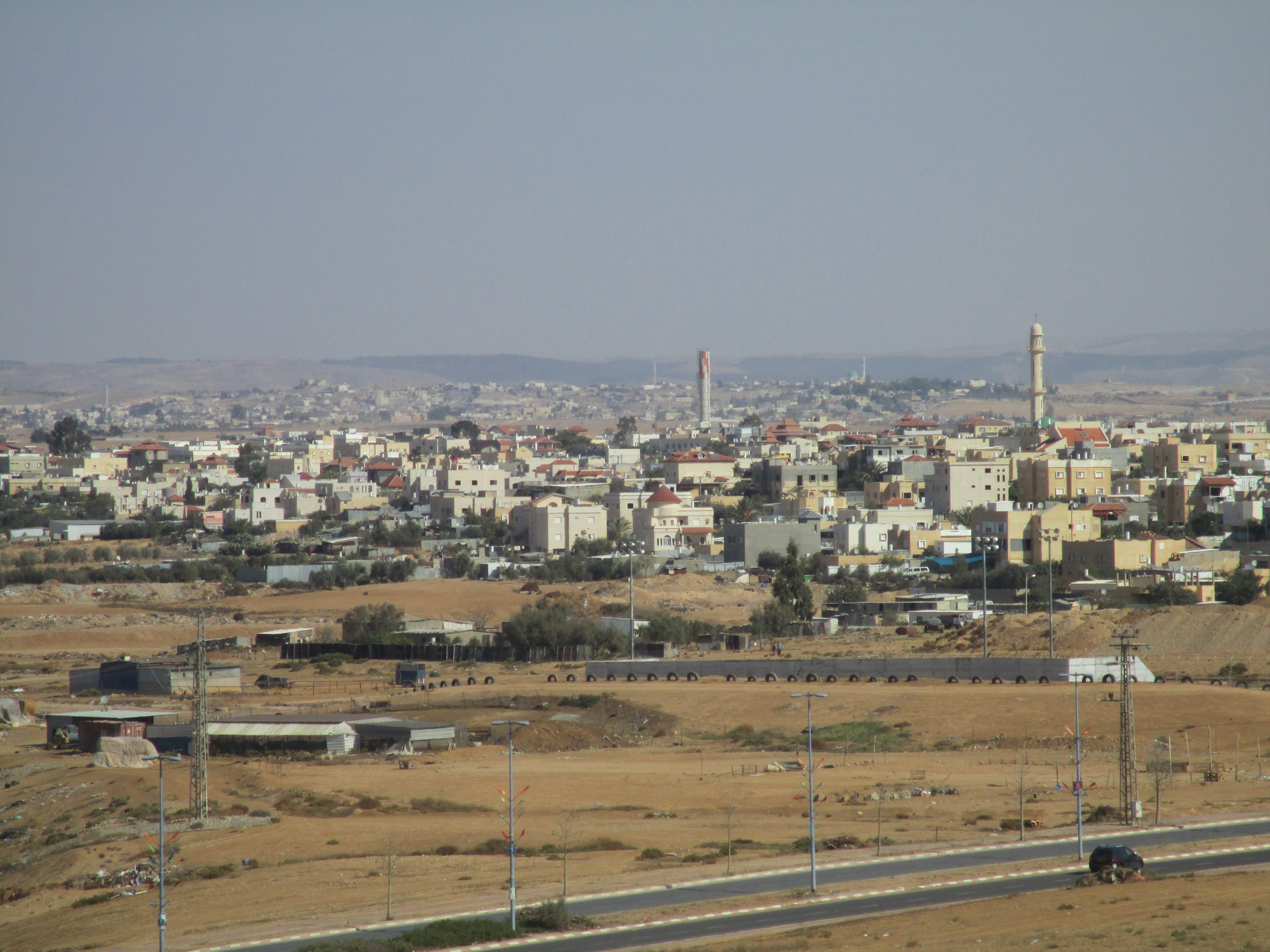

- Location of Tel as-Sabi in Israel Tel Sheva (Israel)
- Coordinates: 31°14′48″N 34°51′22″E
- Country: Israel
- District: Southern
- Subdistrict: Beersheba
- Natural Region: Be'er Sheva
- Founded: 1967

Government
  - Head of Municipality: Musa Abu Isa

Area
  - Total: 5,000 dunams (5.0 km^{2}; 1.9 sq mi)

Population (2024)
  - Total: 24,782
  - Density: 5,000/km^{2} (13,000/sq mi)

Tel Sheva (Hebrew: תֵּל שֶׁבַע) or Tel as-Sabi (Arabic: تل السبع) is a Bedouin town in the Southern District of Israel, bordering the city of Beersheba. In 2024, it had a population of 24,782.

== History ==
The first Bedouin township in Israel, Tel as-Sabi, was founded in 1967 as part of a government project to settle Bedouins in permanent settlements and became a local council in 1984. It is one of seven Bedouin townships in the Negev desert with approved plans and developed infrastructure. The Negev Bedouin, a semi-nomadic society, has been going through a process of sedentarization since the latter part of Ottoman rule in the region.During the British Mandate period, the administration did not provide a legal framework to justify and preserve land ownership. To settle this issue, Israel's land policy was adapted to a large extent from the Ottoman land regulations of 1858, the only prior legal framework. Thus, Israel nationalized most of the Negev lands using the state's land regulations from 1969.

Israel has continued the policy of sedentarization of the Negev Bedouins, first imposed by the Ottoman authorities. Israel's measures at first included regulation and relocation. During the 1950s, Israel relocated two-thirds of the Negev Bedouins into areas administered under martial law. Later on, seven townships were built especially for Bedouins in order to sedentarize and urbanize them by offering better life conditions, proper infrastructure, and high-quality public services, such as sanitation, health, education, and municipal services. The other six townships built during that time are Hura, Lakiya, Ar'arat an-Naqab (Ar'ara BaNegev), Shaqib al-Salam (Segev Shalom), Kuseife (Kseife), and the city of Rahat, the largest among them.

Not all Bedouins agreed to move from tents and structures built on state lands into apartments built specifically for them. About 60% of the Bedouin citizens of Israel live in permanent, planned villages like Tel as-Sabi, while the rest live in illegal homes spread all over the northern Negev region.

As Tel as-Sabi was the first Bedouin township in Israel, mistakes were made by planners and government officials. The authorities tried to learn from these mistakes while planning and building other Bedouin villages and towns, creating, for example, more urban than rural environments.

In 2000, the town was ranked lowest (1 out of 10) in socio-economic standing, and only 43 percent of twelfth-grade students were eligible to graduate from high school.

== Demography ==
According to the Israel Central Bureau of Statistics (CBS), the population of Tel as-Sabi was 13,000 in December 2005 and 15,700 in December 2010. Tel as-Sabi's jurisdiction measures 5,000 dunams (5 km^{2}).

== Economy ==
Several industrial parks are situated in the area - Ramat Hovav, Hura, but the closest industrial zone to Tel as-Sabi is situated in Beersheba. There are several organizations carrying out different activities aimed at supporting and expanding entrepreneurship in Israel's South, thereby further integrating the 160,000 Bedouins living in the Negev into Israel's mainstream economy. They are primarily aimed at Bedouin women.

Twenty Arab-Bedouin women participated in a sewing course for fashion design at the Amal College in Beersheba, including lessons on sewing and cutting, personal empowerment, and business initiatives. Several Bedouin women have undergone professional botanical training and established a business producing a range of unique skin care products based on traditional Bedouin herbal medicine. Their products include cosmetic and dermatological lotions, creams, and ointments. Their products are manufactured at the laboratories of Hlavin, an international cosmetics manufacturer and exporter in Ra’anana.

== Sports ==
Hapoel Tel Sheva is a football team based in Tel as-Sabi, a member of the Israel Football Association.

== Voting Patterns ==
In the 2022 election, 97 percent of voters in Tel Sheva voted for the Arab parties, while 1 percent voted for the parties of the center-left coalition led by Yair Lapid and 1 percent voted for the parties of the right-wing coalition led by Benjamin Netanyahu. Among the voters for the Arab parties, 84 percent voted for Ra'am, while 8 percent voted for Balad and 8 percent voted for the Hadash–Ta'al list.

In the 2026 election, 99 percent of voters in Tel Sheva voted for the Arab parties, while 0.4 percent voted for the parties of the center-left coalition led by Gadi Eisenkot and 0.2 percent voted for the parties of the right-wing coalition led by Benjamin Netanyahu. Among the voters for the Arab parties, 91 percent voted for Ra'am, while 9 percent voted for the Joint List. Voter turnout increased 78 percent from the 2022 election.

== See also ==
- Arab localities in Israel
- Bedouin In Israel
