= Neve Midbar Regional Council =

Regional council in the northwestern Negev

Coordinates: 31°8′5″N 34°57′32″E

Neve Midbar נווה מדבר
- Regional council (from 2012)
- Interactive map of Neve Midbar
- Country: Israel
- District: Southern
- Subdistrict: Beersheba
- Natural region: Be'er Sheva, Northern Negev Mountains

Government
  - Head of Municipality: Ibrahim Alhwashla

Area
  - Total: 32,700 dunams (32.7 km^{2}; 12.6 sq mi)

Population (2021)
  - Total: 13,300
  - Density: 407/km^{2} (1,050/sq mi)
- Website: Official website

Neve Midbar Regional Council (Hebrew: מועצה אזורית נווה מדבר, Moatza Azorit Neveh Midbar, Arabic: المجلس الإقليمي واحة, al-Majlis al-Iqlīmī Wāḥah) is one of two regional councils formed as a result of a split of Abu Basma Regional Council on November 5, 2012. This regional council is situated in the northwestern Negev desert of Israel and populated by the Negev Bedouin.

== List of communities ==
There are four recognized communities in the Newe Midbar Regional Council:

- Abu Talul,
- Abu Qrenat (Abu Quraynat),
- Qasr al-Sir,
- Bir Hadaj.

These communities are populated by almost 10,000 people (as of 2013), Bir Hadaj the largest of them.

There is also a number of "diaspora" Bedouin living in unrecognized villages and thus ineligible for municipal services, whose number is unknown.

== History ==
=== Legal background ===
Prior to the establishment of Israel, the Negev Bedouins were a semi-nomadic pastoralist society that had been through a process of sedentariness since the Ottoman rule of the region. During the British Mandate period, the administration did not provide a legal frame to justify and preserve lands’ ownership. In order to settle this issue, Israel’s land policy was adapted to a large extent from the Ottoman land regulations of 1858 as the only preceding legal frame. Thus Israel nationalized most of the Negev lands using the state’s land regulations from 1969 and designated most of it for military and national security purposes.

=== Sedentarization ===
The 1948 UN Partition Plan, which was accepted by the Jewish leaders, envisaged most of the Negev (including most of the ancestral Negev Bedouin territory) as part of a planned Arab state, with the Jewish State of Israel situated to the north in areas with an existing Jewish majority. However, after the rejection of the UN plan by the united Arab nations, their subsequent declaration of war on Israel, and their eventual defeat in the 1948 Palestine war, the Negev became part of Israel and the Negev Bedouin became Israeli citizens.

The new Israeli government continued the policy of sedentarization of Negev Bedouins imposed by the Ottoman authorities in the early 20th century, mirroring developments in nearby Arab nations. Early stages of this process included regulation of previously open lands used for grazing and re-location of Bedouin tribes. In the decades after the war of independence, the Israeli government was concerned about the allegiance of the Negev Bedouin to the new State, and thus re-located two-thirds of the southern Bedouin population into a closed area under the authority of the IDF. This situation was maintained until the late 1970s.

Starting in the 1980s the civilian government took back control of the northern Negev Bedouin from the IDF and began to establish purpose-built townships specifically for Bedouins in order to sedentarize and urbanize them, and to allow for the provision of government services. The government promoted these towns as offering better living conditions, proper infrastructure and access to public services in health, education, and sanitation. The new development towns constructed by the state in the 1980s absorbed a large proportion of the Negev Bedouin population but were unable to handle the entire Bedouin population, and their later reputation for crime and poor economy, together with a cultural preference for rural life, caused many Israeli Bedouin to shun these towns in favour of rural villages unapproved by the State.

Today, the government estimates that about 60% of Bedouin citizens of Israel live in permanently planned towns, while the rest live in unrecognised villages spread throughout the Negev. These villages are considered illegal under Israeli law, and their legal status, coupled with their periodic demolition and evacuation by police, is the subject of considerable debate.

=== Formation of the Abu Basma regional council ===
In 2003, the government decided to establish a new regional council, known as the Abu Basma Regional Council, in order to oversee the resettlement and development of Bedouin communities in the area around Be'er Sheva, Dimona, and Arad. This was coupled by the formal recognition of a number of existing Bedouin villages within the council in order to encourage Bedouin to move from other unrecognised / illegal villages elsewhere in the Negev.

The council was established by the Interior Ministry on 28 January 2004. At the time, the regional council had a population of approximately 30,000 Bedouins and a total land area of 34,000 dunams, making it the most populous regional council in the Southern District but the smallest in jurisdiction. There was considerable controversy within the Bedouin community regarding the establishment of this council. The Regional Council of Unrecognized Villages (RCUV) argued that while the creation of the Abu Basma Regional Council would set a precedent for the transformation of unrecognized villages into urban ghettos by limiting their boundaries to the area of habitation and zoning most Bedouin grazing grounds; this type of de jure recognition has not entailed the introduction of business districts or de facto recognition through equitable provision of education, health, transportation and municipal waste services long denied to, and demanded, by the Bedouin community.

== Voting Patterns ==
In the 2022 election, 98 percent of voters in the regional council voted for the Arab parties, while 1 percent voted for the parties of the right-wing coalition led by Benjamin Netanyahu and 1 percent voted for the parties of the center-left coalition led by Yair Lapid.

In the 2026 election, 98 percent of voters in the regional council voted for the Arab parties (mostly Ra'am), while 0.6 percent voted for the parties of the center-left coalition led by Gadi Eisenkot and 0.4 percent voted for the parties of the right-wing coalition led by Benjamin Netanyahu. Voter turnout increased 91 percent from the 2022 election.

== See also ==
- Abu Basma Regional Council
- Arab localities in Israel
- Negev Bedouin
