= Ar'arat an-Naqab =

Town in southern Israel

Ar'arat an-Naqab: עַרְעָרָה בַּנֶּגֶב; عرعرة
- Local council

Hebrew transcription(s)
  - Also spelled: Ar'ara BaNegev (official)
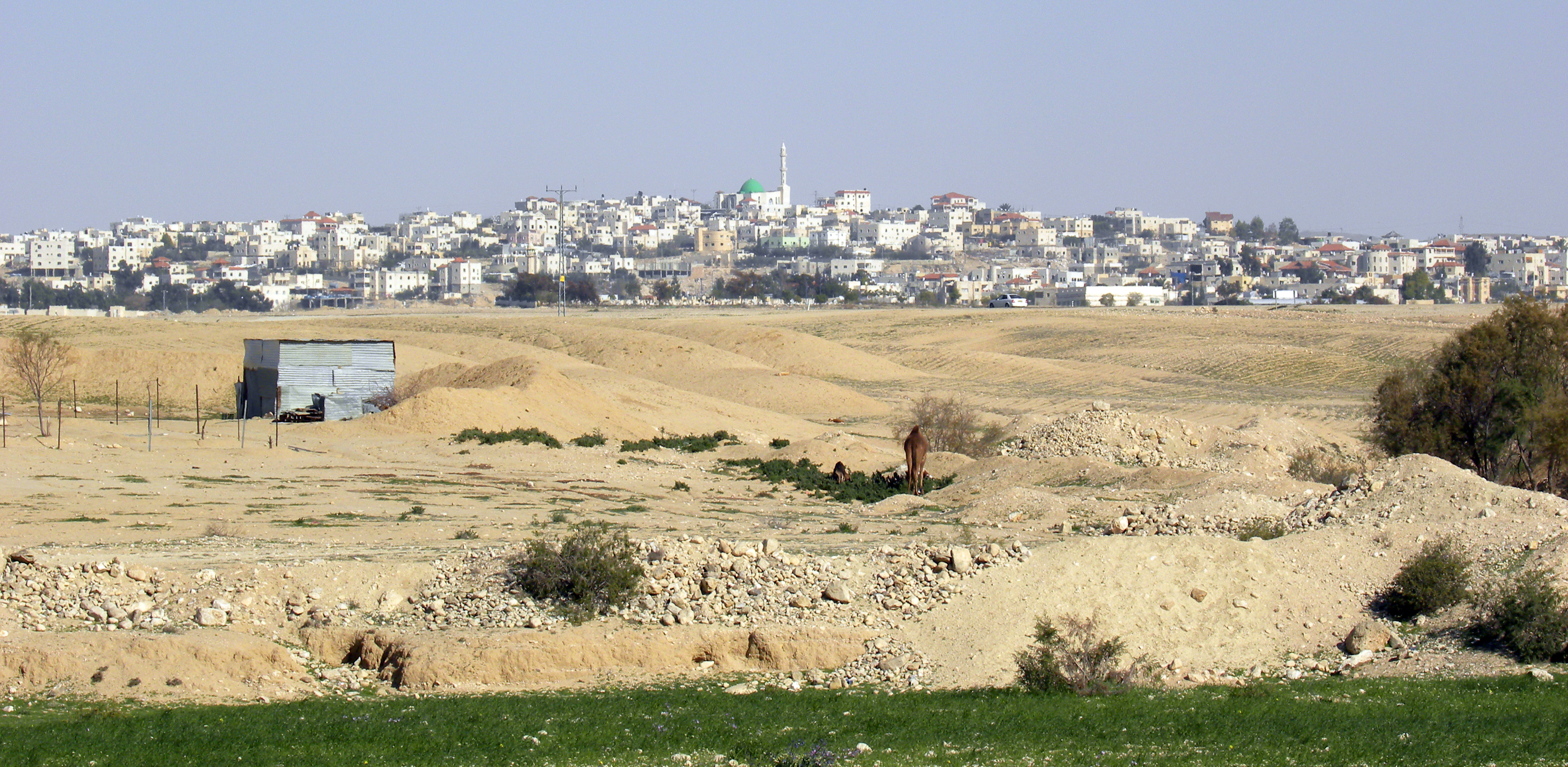

- Location within Northern Negev region of Israel Location within Israel
- Coordinates: 31°09′35″N 35°01′25″E
- Country: Israel
- District: Southern
- Subdistrict: Beersheba
- Natural Region: Be'er Sheva
- Founded: 1982

Government
  - Head of Municipality: David Bonfeld (an acting mayor)

Area
  - Total: 14,052 dunams (14.052 km^{2}; 5.426 sq mi)

Population (2024)
  - Total: 21,259
  - Density: 1,512.9/km^{2} (3,918.3/sq mi)

Ar'arat an-Naqab (Arabic: عرعرة النقب) or Ar'ara BaNegev (Hebrew: עַרְעָרָה בַּנֶּגֶב), previously called Aro'er, is a Bedouin town (local council) in the Southern District of Israel. Its name stands for "the juniper tree in Negev". It is situated not far from the archaeological site of Aroer.

Ar'arat an-Naqab was founded in 1982 as part of a government project to settle Bedouins in permanent settlements. It is one of seven Bedouin townships in the Negev desert with approved plans and developed infrastructure (other six are: Hura, Lakiya, Shaqib al-Salam (Segev Shalom), Kuseife (Kseife), Tel as-Sabi (Tel-Sheva) and the city of Rahat, the largest among them).

== Population ==
According to the Israel Central Bureau of Statistics (CBS), the population of Ar'arat an-Naqab was 21,259 in 2024. Its jurisdiction is 14,052 dunams.

== History ==
Continuing the sedentarization policy of the Ottoman Empire, Israel established seven townships built especially for Bedouins in order to sedentarize and urbanize them by offering them better life conditions, proper infrastructure and high quality public services in sanitation, health and education, and municipal services. But not all Bedouins agree to move from tents and structures built on the state lands into apartments prepared for them. In permanent planned villages like Ar'arat an-Naqab lives about 60% of Bedouin citizens of Israel, while the rest in illegal homes spread all over North Negev.

The rate of unemployment remains high in Bedouin townships, as well as crime level. School through age 16 is mandatory by law, but the vast majority of the population does not receive a high school education. Women are discriminated in the patriarchal-type Bedouin society.

== Employment ==
Despite the fact that unemployment level among Negev Bedouins is high, there are several employment opportunities in the region. Several industrial parks are situated in the area - Ramat Hovav, Hura, there are industrial zones in Beersheba, Arad and Dimona, etc. Other job opportunities are: several chemical plants near the Dead Sea like the Dead Sea Works, different high-tech companies and textile shops. There is a number of Bedouins working in the area of service.

== Infrastructure ==
=== Medical services ===
There are branches of several health funds (medical clinics) in Ar'arat an-Naqab: Leumit, Clalit, Maccabi and several Tipat Halav perinatal (baby care) centers.

=== Education ===
There are a number of schools in the township.

=== Sewage ===
Until 2009, Ar'arat an-Naqab's sewage either went through an old purification facility or into one of several pools that were created in the 1980s and posed an environmental hazard. As a result of the construction and expansion of nearby Nevatim Airbase, the Israel Air Force invested in modernizing the purification facility so that it was sufficient for the needs of the village as well as the airbase.

== Voting Patterns ==
In the 2022 election, 98 percent of voters in Ar'arat an-Naqab voted for the Arab parties, while 1 percent voted for the parties of the center-left coalition led by Yair Lapid and 1 percent voted for the parties of the right-wing coalition led by Benjamin Netanyahu. Among the voters for the Arab parties, 94 percent voted for Ra'am, while 3 percent voted for Balad and 3 percent voted for the Hadash–Ta'al list.

In the 2026 election, 98 percent of voters in Ar'arat an-Naqab voted for the Arab parties, while 0.7 percent voted for the parties of the center-left coalition led by Gadi Eisenkot and 0.3 percent voted for the parties of the right-wing coalition led by Benjamin Netanyahu. Among the voters for the Arab parties, 86 percent voted for Ra'am, while 14 percent voted for the Joint List. Voter turnout increased 69 percent from the 2022 election.

== See also ==
- Arab localities in Israel
- Negev Bedouin
