= Omer, Israel =

Town in southern Israel

Omer עומר
- Local council

Hebrew transcription(s)
  - ISO 259: ʕomr
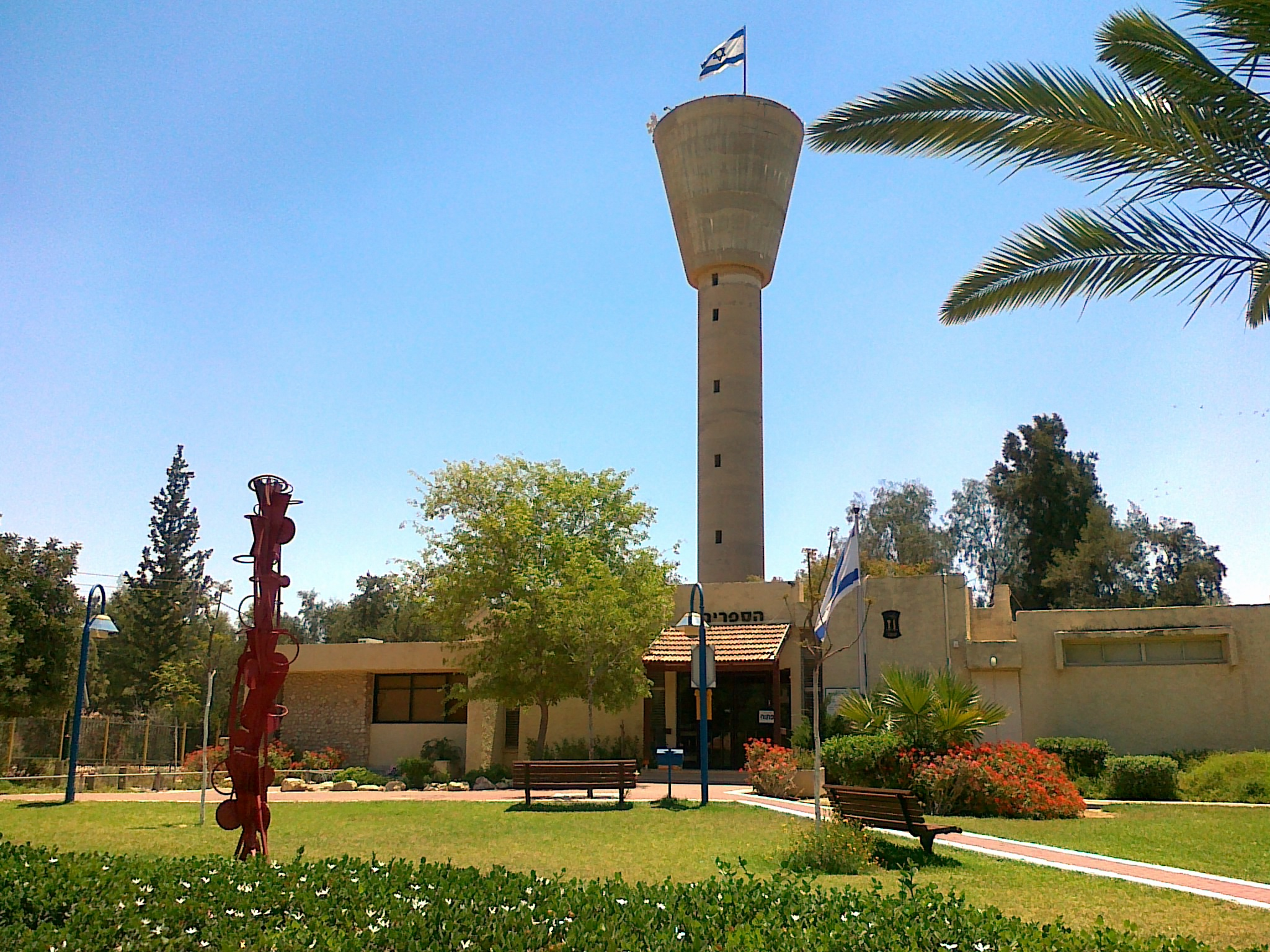

- Location within Northern Negev region of Israel Location within Israel
- Coordinates: 31°15′51″N 34°50′49″E
- Country: Israel
- District: Southern
- Sub-district: Beersheba
- Natural Region: Be'er Sheva
- Founded: 1949

Government
  - Head of Municipality: Erez Badash

Area
  - Total: 20.1 km^{2} (7.8 sq mi)

Population (2024)
  - Total: 8,078
  - Density: 402/km^{2} (1,040/sq mi)
- Name meaning: Sheaf
- Website: www.omer.muni.il

Omer (Hebrew: עומר, lit. 'Sheaf') is an affluent town in the Southern District of Israel, bordering Beersheba. It is located on Highway 60, between Beersheba and the Shoket Junction. In 2024 it had a population of 8,078.

== History ==
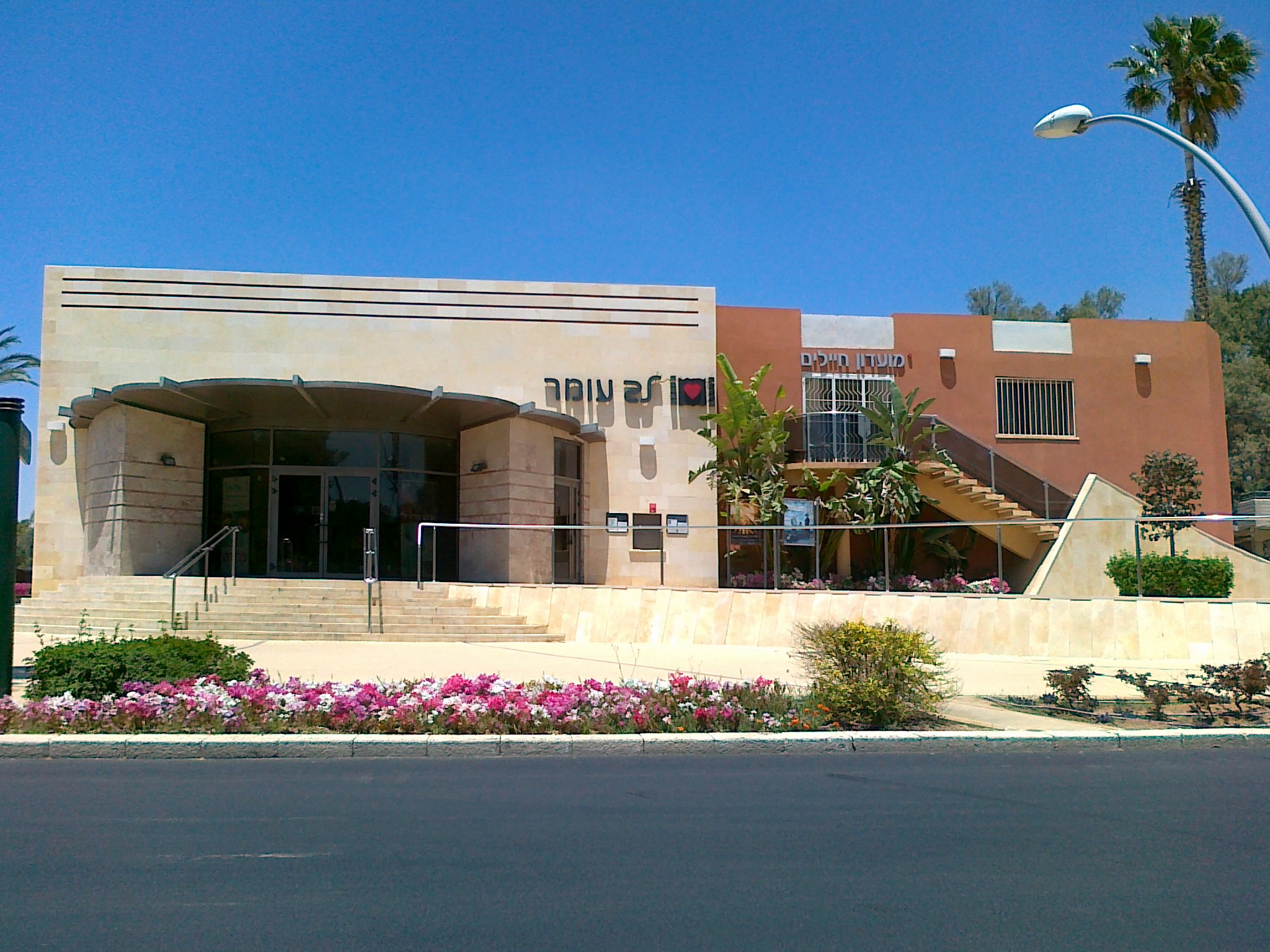
Omer movie theater and soldiers' club

Omer, originally known as Hevrona, was founded as a kibbutz in 1949. The early residents were demobilized Palmach soldiers. In 1951, it became a cooperative village known as Eilata. In 1953, it was re-established as a communal moshav by immigrants from Hungary and Romania and renamed Omer. The name is based on the offering of the first sheafs in Leviticus 23:10.

In 1957, residents of the ma'abarot in the vicinity moved to Omer. In 1962, it was renamed Tomer and became a neighborhood of Beersheba. Since 1974, it has been an independent town and suburb of Beersheba.

Pini Badash has served as mayor since 1990. Omer's jurisdiction is 20,126 dunams (~20.1 km²).

== Economy ==
Omer is known for its high socio-economic ranking. It is one of four municipalities to score 10/10, along with Kfar Shmaryahu, Lehavim and Savyon.

== Demographics ==
Historical population
Year	Pop.	±%
1972	1,300	—
1983	4,400	+238.5%
1995	5,700	+29.5%
2008	6,400	+12.3%
2022	8,250	+28.9%
2024	8,077	−2.1%

== Voting Patterns ==
In the 2022 election, 60 percent of voters in Omer voted for the parties of the center-left coalition led by Yair Lapid, while 36 percent voted for the parties of the right-wing coalition led by Benjamin Netanyahu and 1 percent voted for the Arab parties.

In the 2026 election, 59 percent of voters in Omer voted for the parties of the center-left coalition led by Gadi Eisenkot, while 32 percent voted for the parties of the right-wing coalition led by Benjamin Netanyahu and 1.7 percent voted for the Arab parties. An additional 3.7 percent voted for the Reservists, and 3 percent voted for Amcha Yisrael. Voter turnout increased 11 percent from the 2022 election.

== Notable residents ==
- Eviatar Banai (b. 1973), musician
- Orna Banai (b. 1966), actress and comedian
- Guy Barnea (b. 1987), Olympic swimmer
- Roni Dalumi (b. 1991), singer
- Mickey Edelstein (b. 1966), general
- Amir Ganiel (1963–2018), swimmer
- Imri Ganiel (b. 1992), Olympic swimmer
- Ziv Kalontarov (b. 1997), Olympic swimmer
- Shaul Ladany (b. 1936), world-record-holding Olympic racewalker, Bergen-Belsen survivor, Munich Massacre survivor, and Professor of Industrial Engineering
