= Shaqib al-Salam =

Bedouin town in southern Israel

Shaqib al-Salam: שֶׂגֶב שָׁלוֹם; شقيب السلام
- Local council (from 1996)

Hebrew transcription(s)
  - Also spelled: Segev Shalom (official); Shaqeeb as-Salaam, Shqeb as-Salam (unofficial)
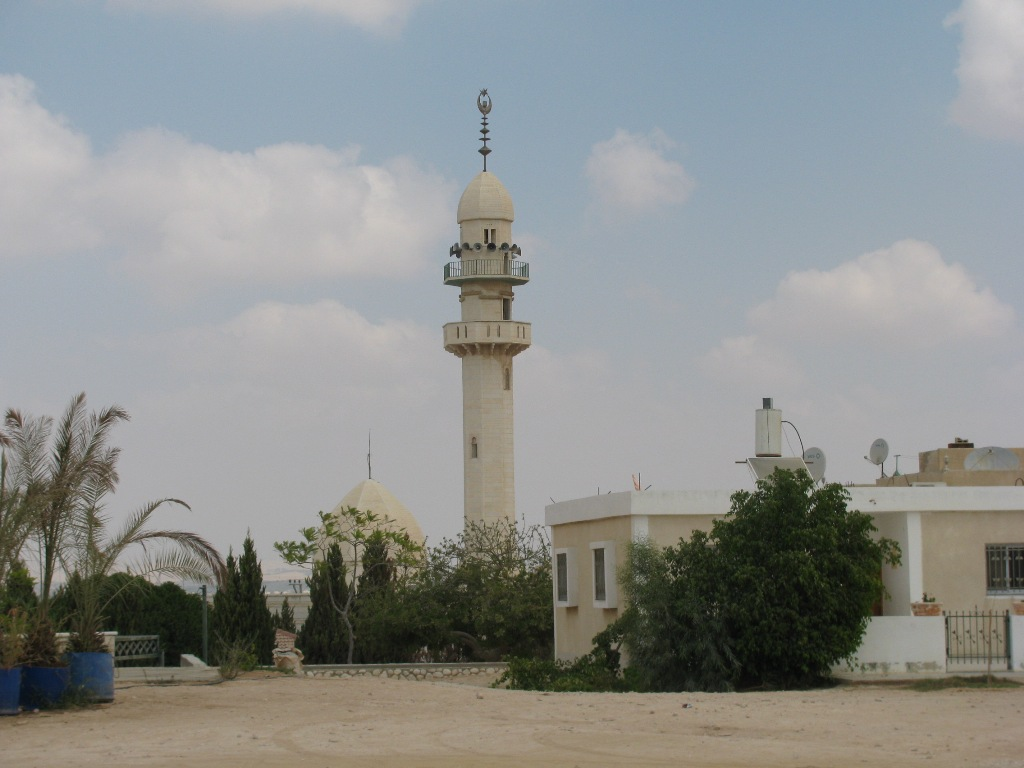

- Location within Northern Negev region of Israel Location within Israel
- Coordinates: 31°11′50″N 34°50′18″E
- Country: Israel
- District: Southern
- Subdistrict: Beersheba
- Natural Region: Be'er Sheva
- Founded: 1979

Government
  - Head of Municipality: Omar Abu Muamar

Area
  - Total: 5,981 dunams (5.981 km^{2}; 2.309 sq mi)

Population (2024)
  - Total: 16,736
  - Density: 2,798/km^{2} (7,247/sq mi)

Shaqib al-Salam (Arabic: شقيب السلام) or Shqeb as-Salam, official Hebrew name Segev Shalom (שֶׂגֶב שָׁלוֹם), is a Bedouin town and a local council in the Southern District of Israel, southeast of Beersheba. In 2024 it had a population of 16,736.

Shaqib was founded in 1979 as part of a government project to settle Negev Bedouins in permanent settlements. It was declared a local council in 1996. It is one of seven Bedouin townships in the Negev desert with approved plans and developed infrastructure alongside Hura, Tel as-Sabi (Tel Sheva), Ar'arat an-Naqab (Ar'ara BaNegev), Lakiya, Kuseife (Kseife) and the city of Rahat, the largest among them.

== Etymology ==
The town is named for the Sagiv river that flows nearby and the Camp David Accords between Egypt and Israel (salam means peace in Arabic, like shalom in Hebrew), which were signed the same year the township was founded.

== History ==
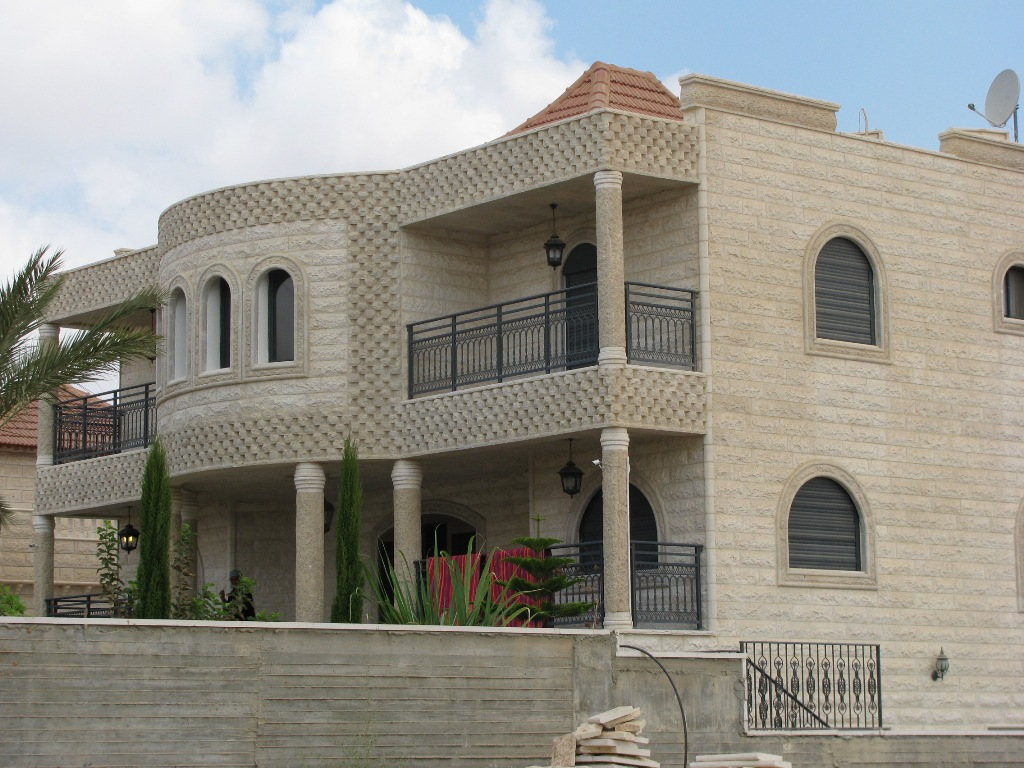
Private home in Shaqib al-Salam

Prior to the establishment of Israel, the Negev Bedouins were a semi-nomadic society in the process of sedentariness since the Ottoman rule of the region.

During the British Mandate, the administration did not provide a legal frame to justify and preserve lands’ ownership. In order to settle this issue, Israel's land policy was adapted to a large extent from the Ottoman land regulations of 1858 as the only preceding legal frame. Thus Israel nationalized most of the Negev lands using the state's land regulations from 1969.

Shaqib al-Salam/Segev Shalom was founded in 1979 based on an agreement reached with Azazmeh Sheikh Ouda which allowed the tribe to settle on its traditional lands. The Segev Shalom local council, with nine members, was created as an instrument of local government. In 2000, the council held mayoral elections.

== Demographics ==
According to the Israel Central Bureau of Statistics (CBS), the population of Shaqib was 7,739 in December 2010, up from 6,500 in December 2006. The average population growth rate here was 5.5%.

Shaqib al-Salam's jurisdiction is 5,981 dunams (5.981 km^{2}; 2.309 sq mi). Most residents belong to various clans of the al-Azazme tribe which also populates Bir Hadaj, and also to Tarabin.

== Economy ==
The township is situated close to Beersheva so its economy is closely related to that of the city. Several industrial parks are situated in the area: Beersheba, Hura, Ramat Hovav, Idan HaNegev and Rahat. Residents also work in the services industry in Beersheba. There are several organizations that promote entrepreneurship among the 160,000 Bedouins living in the Negev, primarily aimed at Bedouin women.

As of 2015, the average monthly income was 4,908 shekels.

In May 2010 a One Stop Employment Center was established in Shaqib al-Salam to facilitate the integration of Bedouins into the workplace. It has dramatically increased the proportion of Bedouins employed.

== Education and culture ==
There is a number of organizations carrying out different activities aimed at supporting and facilitating entrepreneurship in Israel's South in order to further integrate the 160,000 Bedouins living in the Negev into Israel's mainstream economy. They are primarily aimed at Bedouin women.

Twenty Arab-Bedouin women from the towns of Rahat, Lakiya, Tel Sheva, Segev Shalom, Kuseife and Rachma participated in a sewing course for fashion design at the Amal College in Beer Sheva, including lessons on sewing and cutting, personal empowerment and business initiatives.

== Healthcare ==
There is a branch of Clalit Health Services in the township, as well as several Tipat Halav perinatal (baby care) centers.

== Parks and landmarks ==
The Jewish National Fund built a central park with an amphitheater adjacent to the community's town hall.

== Voting Patterns ==
In the 2022 election, 97 percent of voters in Shaqib al-Salam voted for the Arab parties, while 2 percent voted for the parties of the right-wing coalition led by Benjamin Netanyahu and 1 percent voted for the parties of the center-left coalition led by Yair Lapid. Among the voters for the Arab parties, 73 percent voted for Ra'am, while 26 percent voted for the Hadash–Ta'al list and 1 percent voted for Balad.

In the 2026 election, 97 percent of voters in Shaqib al-Salam voted for the Arab parties, while 2 percent voted for the parties of the center-left coalition led by Gadi Eisenkot and 0.2 percent voted for the parties of the right-wing coalition led by Benjamin Netanyahu. Among the voters for the Arab parties, 94 percent voted for Ra'am, while 6 percent voted for the Joint List. Voter turnout almost doubled compared with the 2022 election.

== See also ==
- Arab localities in Israel
- Negev Bedouin
