= Kuseife =

Town in southern Israel

Kuseife: כְּסֵיפָה; كسيفة
- Local council
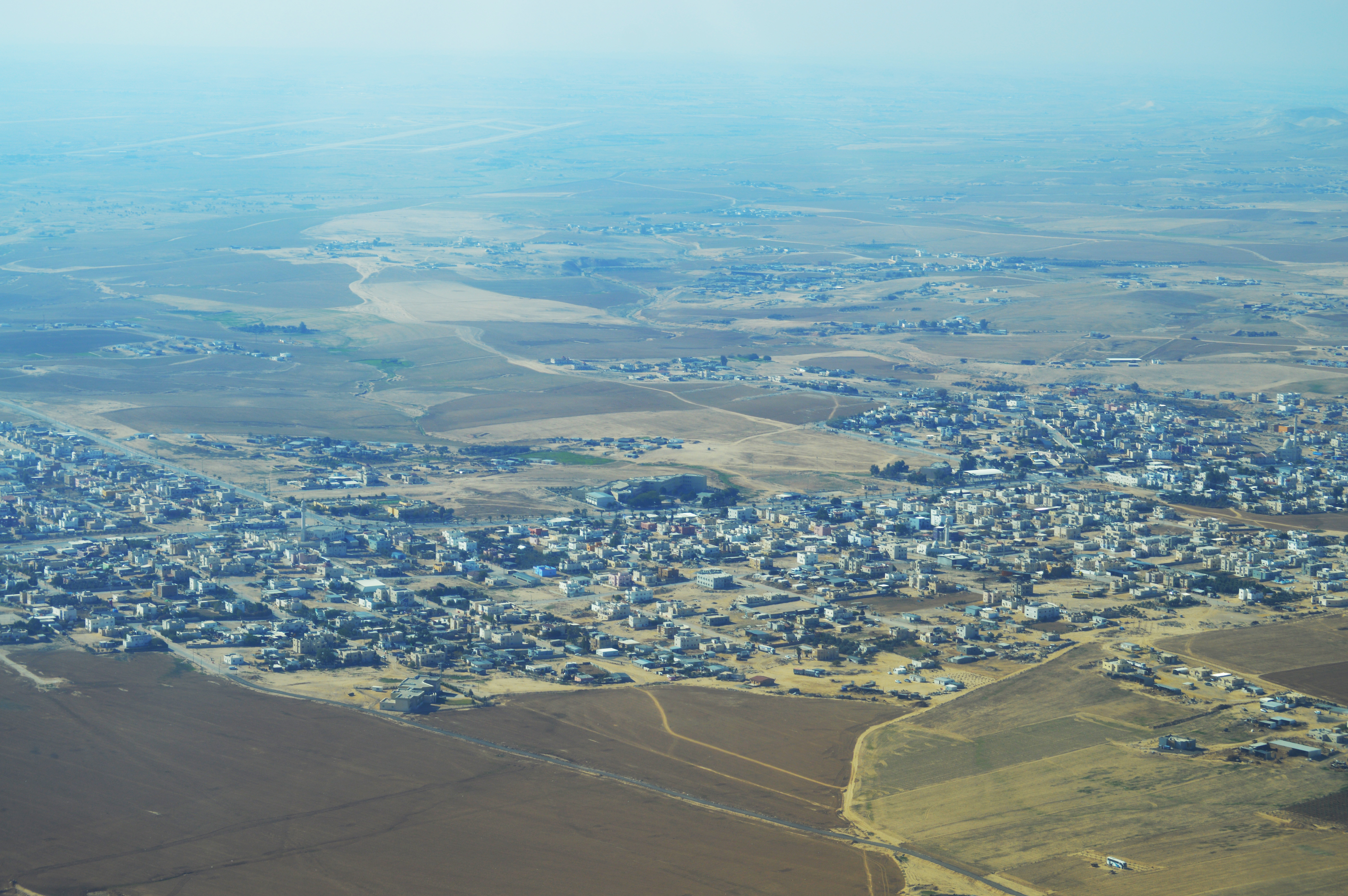

- Location within Northern Negev region of Israel Location within Israel
- Coordinates: 31°14′43″N 35°05′34″E
- Country: Israel
- District: Southern
- Subdistrict: Beersheba
- Natural Region: Be'er Sheva
- Founded: 1982

Government
  - Head of Municipality: Salem Abu Ravieh

Area
  - Total: 13,692 dunams (13.692 km^{2}; 5.287 sq mi)

Population (2024)
  - Total: 21,849
  - Density: 1,595.7/km^{2} (4,133.0/sq mi)

Kuseife (Arabic: كسيفة) or Kseifa (Hebrew: כְּסֵיפָה) is a Bedouin town organized as a local council in the Southern District of Israel. Kuseife was founded in 1982 as part of a government project to plan and build towns for Negev Bedouins. In 1996 it was declared a local council, and in 2024 it had a population of 21,849.

== History ==
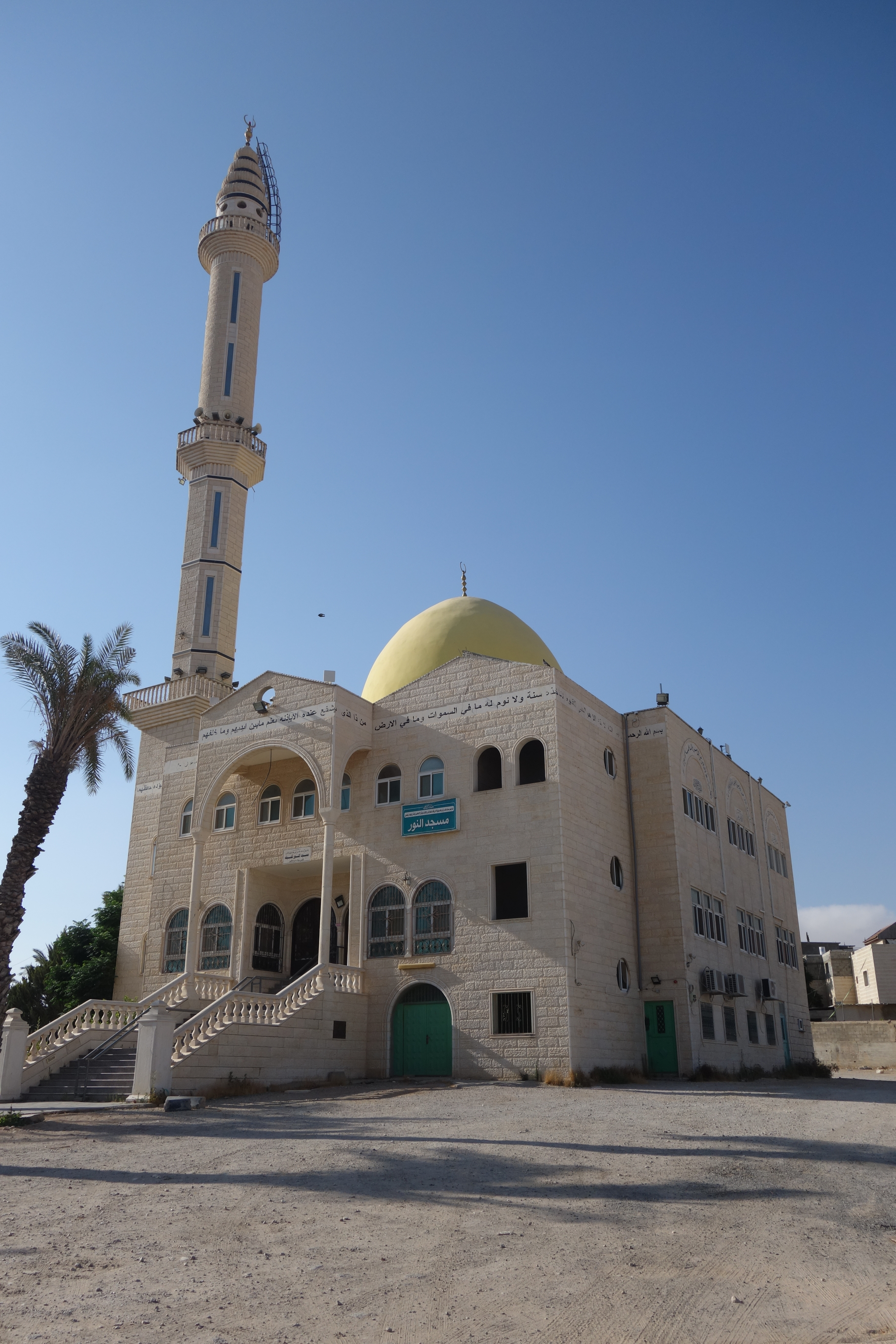
Al Noor mosque

=== British Mandate ===
The Survey of Western Palestine noted Khurbet Kuseifeh as “a small ruin with foundations and heaps of stones.”

=== Israel ===
The area appears as Kuseife in the military administration documents starting from the 1950s.

After the peace treaty signed between Egypt and Israel, the Sinai Peninsula was returned to Egypt and all the IDF bases stationed there were removed to the Israeli territory, some of them to the Negev desert. One of them was a Nevatim Airbase. A township adjacent to the base appeared at the same time. Kuseifa was one of seven townships planned and built for Bedouins in order to sedentarize and urbanize by offering better life conditions, proper infrastructure and high quality public services in sanitation, health and education, and municipal services. The other towns founded alongside were Hura, Lakiya, Ar'arat an-Naqab, Shaqib al-Salam, Tel as-Sabi and Rahat. Initially, development of Kuseifa was strained by land claims of Bedouins that were later resolved.

== Population ==
Members of several Bedouin family clans reside in Kuseife: Abu Ajaj, Elamor, el-Zabarka, el-Nasasra, the biggest of them Abu-Rabia. Other families are: Azbarga, El-Dada, Abu Juda and Abu Anam. A part of el-Nasasra and Elamor clans lives outside Kuseife in a close proximity to the Nevatim Airbase.

According to the Israel Central Bureau of Statistics (CBS), the population of Kuseife was 17,400 in December 2010 (10,300 in December 2006). Its annual growth rate is 3.6%. Kuseife's jurisdiction is 13,692 dunams (almost 13.7 km^{2}). Israeli Statistics classified the town as religious to very religious.

Population of Kuseife by year

== Economy and services ==
According to the CBS data for December 2009, the local council of Kuseife is ranked lowest (1 out of 10) in its socio-economic ranking with an average income NIS 4,331 to the national average of NIS 7,070 (2009). Only 43.4% of grade twelve students are eligible to graduate from high school (2008-2009).

Industrial parks are in the area include Hura and Dimona. The closest industrial zone to Kuseife is situated in Arad. Other job opportunities are: several chemical plants near the Dead Sea like the Dead Sea Works, different high-tech companies and textile shops. Some Bedouins work in the service industry.

There are several schools in the township and a community center. Medical clinics in Kuseife include Leumit, Clalit, Maccabi and several Tipat Halav perinatal (baby care) centers.

In May 2017, a railway extension from Beersheba to Arad with a station at Kuseife was approved. The line would connect to the existing Beersheba-Dimona rail line at the proposed new station at Nevatim.

== Voting Patterns ==
In the 2022 election, 90 percent of voters in Kuseife voted for the Arab parties, while 7 percent voted for the parties of the center-left coalition led by Yair Lapid and 1 percent voted for the parties of the right-wing coalition led by Benjamin Netanyahu. Among the voters for the Arab parties, 79 percent voted for Ra'am, while 12 percent voted for Balad and 9 percent voted for the Hadash–Ta'al list.

In the 2026 election, 97 percent of voters in Kuseife voted for the Arab parties, while 1.7 percent voted for the parties of the center-left coalition led by Gadi Eisenkot and 0.4 percent voted for the parties of the right-wing coalition led by Benjamin Netanyahu. Among the voters for the Arab parties, 86 percent voted for Ra'am, while 14 percent voted for the Joint List. Voter turnout increased 89 percent from the 2022 election.
