= Lakiya =

Town in southern Israel

Lakiya: לָקִיָּה; اللقية; Laqye
- Local council
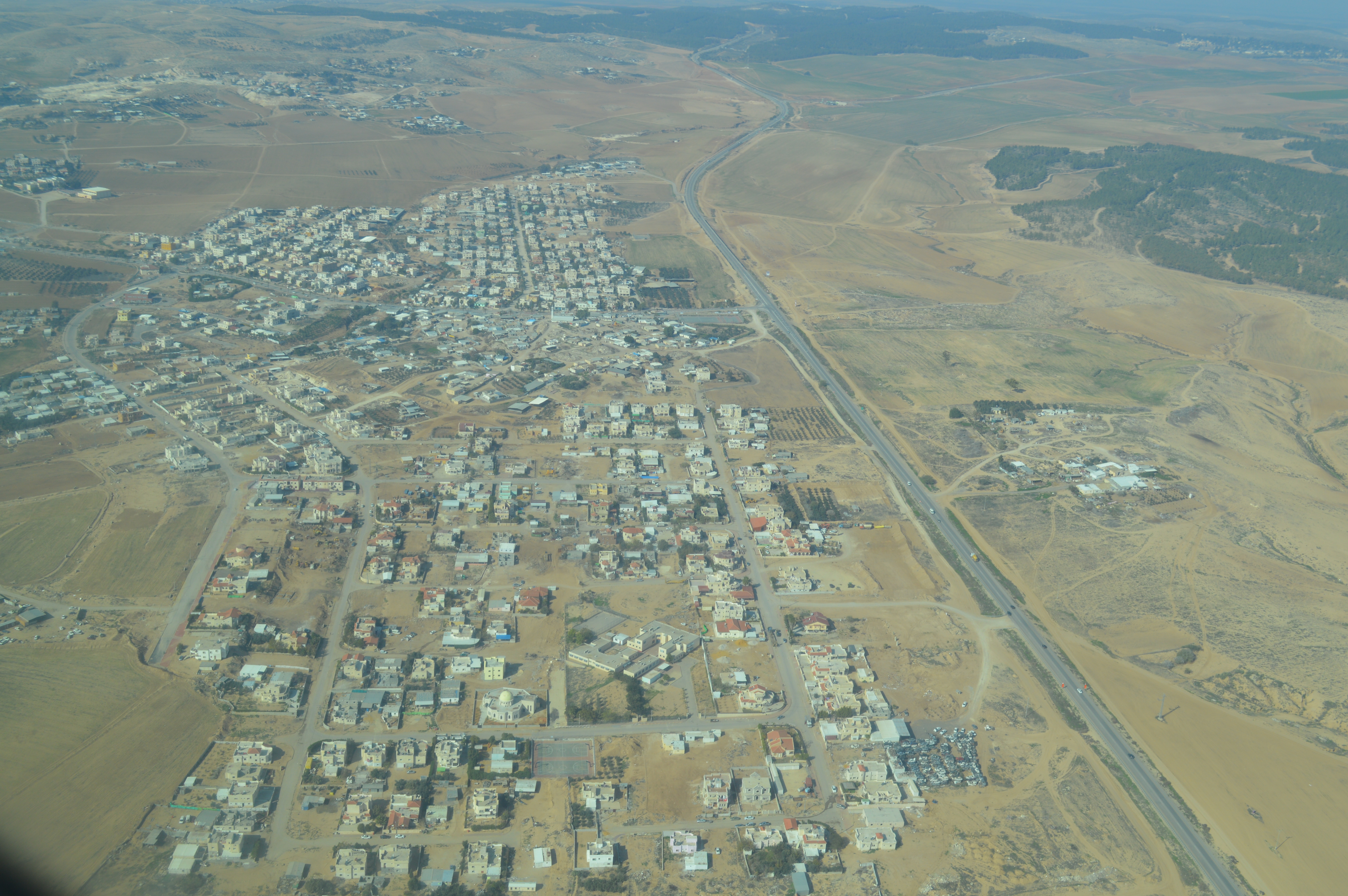

- Location within Northern Negev region of Israel Location within Israel
- Coordinates: 31°19′28″N 34°52′2″E
- Country: Israel
- District: Southern
- Subdistrict: Beersheba
- Natural Region: Be'er Sheva
- Founded: 1982

Government
  - Head of Municipality: Khaled el-Sana

Area
  - Total: 5,728 dunams (5.728 km^{2}; 2.212 sq mi)

Population (2024)
  - Total: 19,362
  - Density: 3,380/km^{2} (8,755/sq mi)

Lakiya (Hebrew: לָקִיָּה) or Laqye (Arabic: اللقية, romanized: al-Laqya) is a Bedouin town (local council) in the Southern District of Israel. In 2024 it had a population of 19,362.

== History ==
Lakiya was founded in 1985 as part of a government project to settle Bedouins in permanent settlements. It is one of the seven original government-planned Bedouin townships in the Negev desert.

In 1999 the first local council elections were held, with Sheikh Ibrahim Abu Maharab elected as council head. Abu Maharab was later succeeded by Khaled al-Sana.

Since 2016, the Trans-Israel Highway 6 services Lakiya, being connected to the town through both the Lakiya and Shoket Interchanges.

== Demographics ==
According to the Israel Central Bureau of Statistics (CBS), the population of Lakiya was 9,943 in December 2010 (7,600 in December 2004). Its annual growth rate is 3.1%. Lakiya's jurisdiction is 5,728 dunams (5.7 km²).

There are several Bedouin clans residing in Lakiya, the largest being al-Sana; other families are al-Assad, Abu Ammar and Abu Maharab. Some clans do not live inside Lakiya, but on adjacent territory.

== Economy ==
In 2013, Arab-Bedouin women from Lakiya and other Bedouin towns participated in a sewing course for fashion design at the Amal College in Beer Sheva, including lessons on sewing and cutting, personal empowerment and business initiatives.

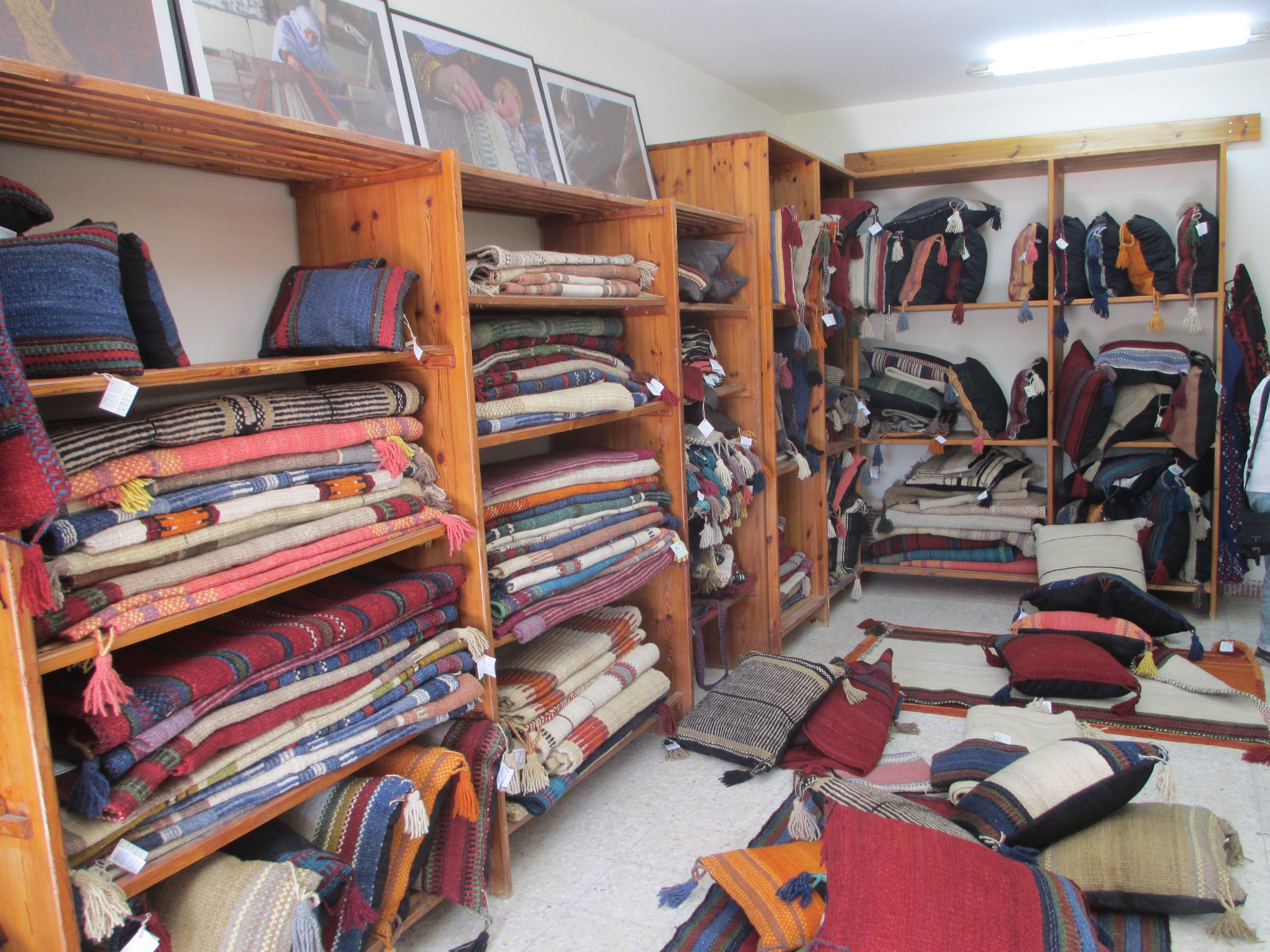
Lakiya weaving project

The Lakiya Negev Weaving Project was founded in 1991 to empower Negev Bedouin women by applying their traditional weaving skills to the manufacture and sale of woven products. It is based on the unique Bedouin heritage passed on from mother to daughter. Approximately 130 Bedouin women are involved in all the stages of the production from initial wool treatment, weaving the rugs, cushion covers and pouches, and sales. The women were provided with professional guidance and hands-on assistance in marketing, branding, sales, the business's organizational structure and business plan, fundraising and networking. The aim was to create a profitable and financially independent cooperative business. Several retailers and chains now sell the goods in Israel and abroad.

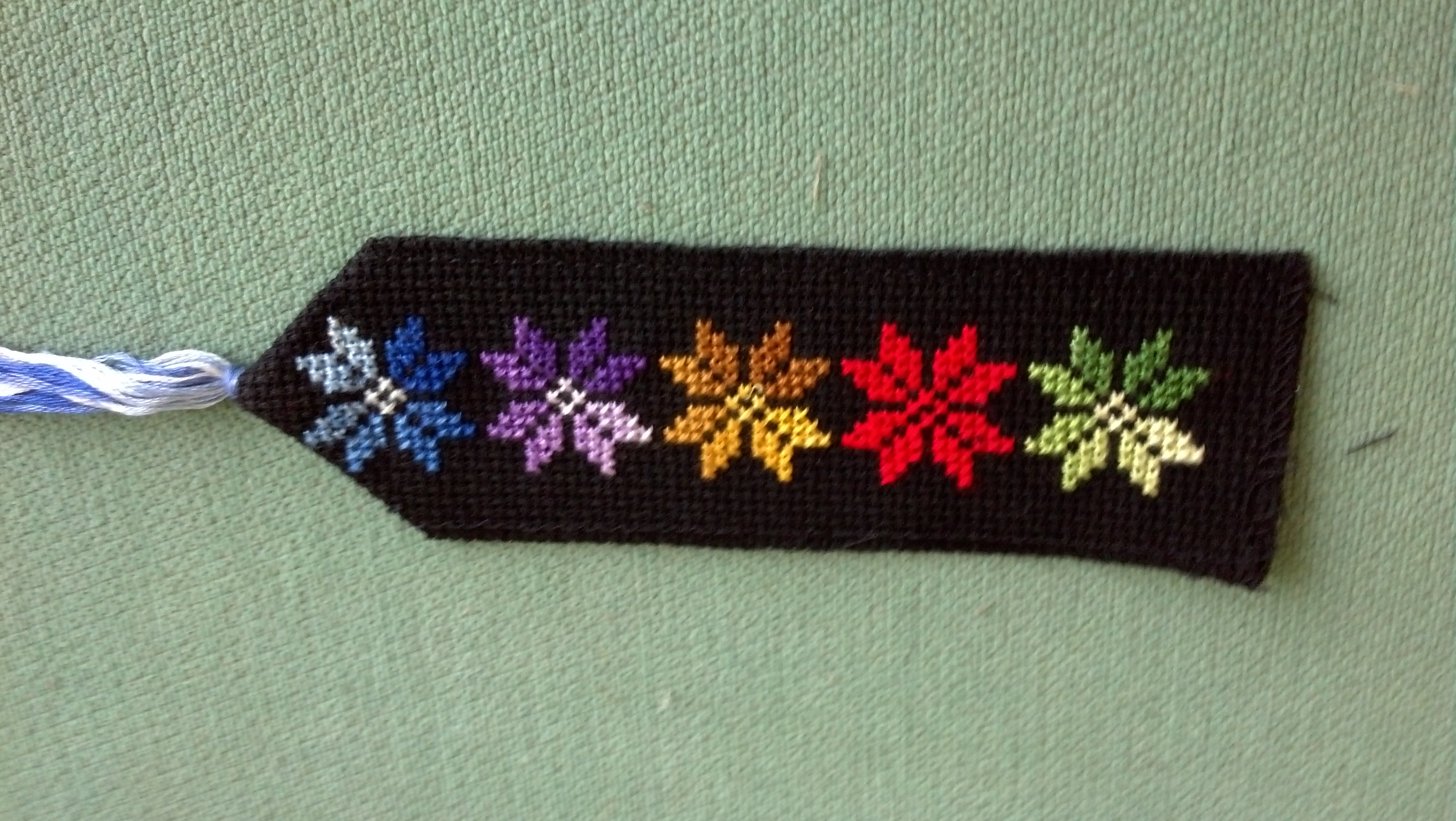
Embroidered bookmark of the Lakiya Project

The Desert Embroidery Project is another women's empowerment program in Lakiya Some 20 women completed their professional entrepreneurial and business training and guidance and initiated a project based on the design and production of the traditional Bedouin costume jewelry. They are producing this embroidery at home with traditional Bedouin motifs and decorations. The women also hold Bedouin embroidery workshops and events based on the Bedouin tradition. Their workshop also serves as a visitors' center.

== Notable people ==
- Ismael Abu-Saad, professor of education, Ben-Gurion University of the Negev
- Amal Elsana Alh'jooj, feminist and peace activist
- Roz Willey as-Sana, Bedouin Weaving project coordinator
- Taleb el-Sana, an Israeli politician, the longest serving Arab member of the Knesset

== Voting Patterns ==
In the 2022 election, 98 percent of voters in Lakiya voted for the Arab parties, while 1 percent voted for the parties of the center-left coalition led by Yair Lapid and 1 percent voted for the parties of the right-wing coalition led by Benjamin Netanyahu. Among the voters for the Arab parties, 70 percent voted for Ra'am, while 24 percent voted for Balad and 6 percent voted for the Hadash–Ta'al list.

In the 2026 election, 98 percent of voters in Lakiya voted for the Arab parties, while 0.7 percent voted for the parties of the center-left coalition led by Gadi Eisenkot and 0.2 percent voted for the parties of the right-wing coalition led by Benjamin Netanyahu. Among the voters for the Arab parties, 80 percent voted for Ra'am, while 20 percent voted for the Joint List. Voter turnout more than doubled compared with the 2022 election.

== See also ==
- Arab localities in Israel
