= Southern District (Israel) =

Coordinates: 30°37′N 34°48′E

- District of Israel

transcription(s)
  - Hebrew: מָחוֹז הדָּרוֹם
  - Arabic: لواء الجنوب
- Interactive map of Southern District
- Cities: 12
- Local councils: 11
- Regional councils: 15
- Capital: Beersheba
- Largest city: Ashdod

Government
  - District Commissioner: Lily Feintoch

Area
  - Total: 14,185 km^{2} (5,477 sq mi)

Population (2024)
  - Total: 1,444,259
  - Density: 101.82/km^{2} (263.70/sq mi)
- ISO 3166 code: IL-D

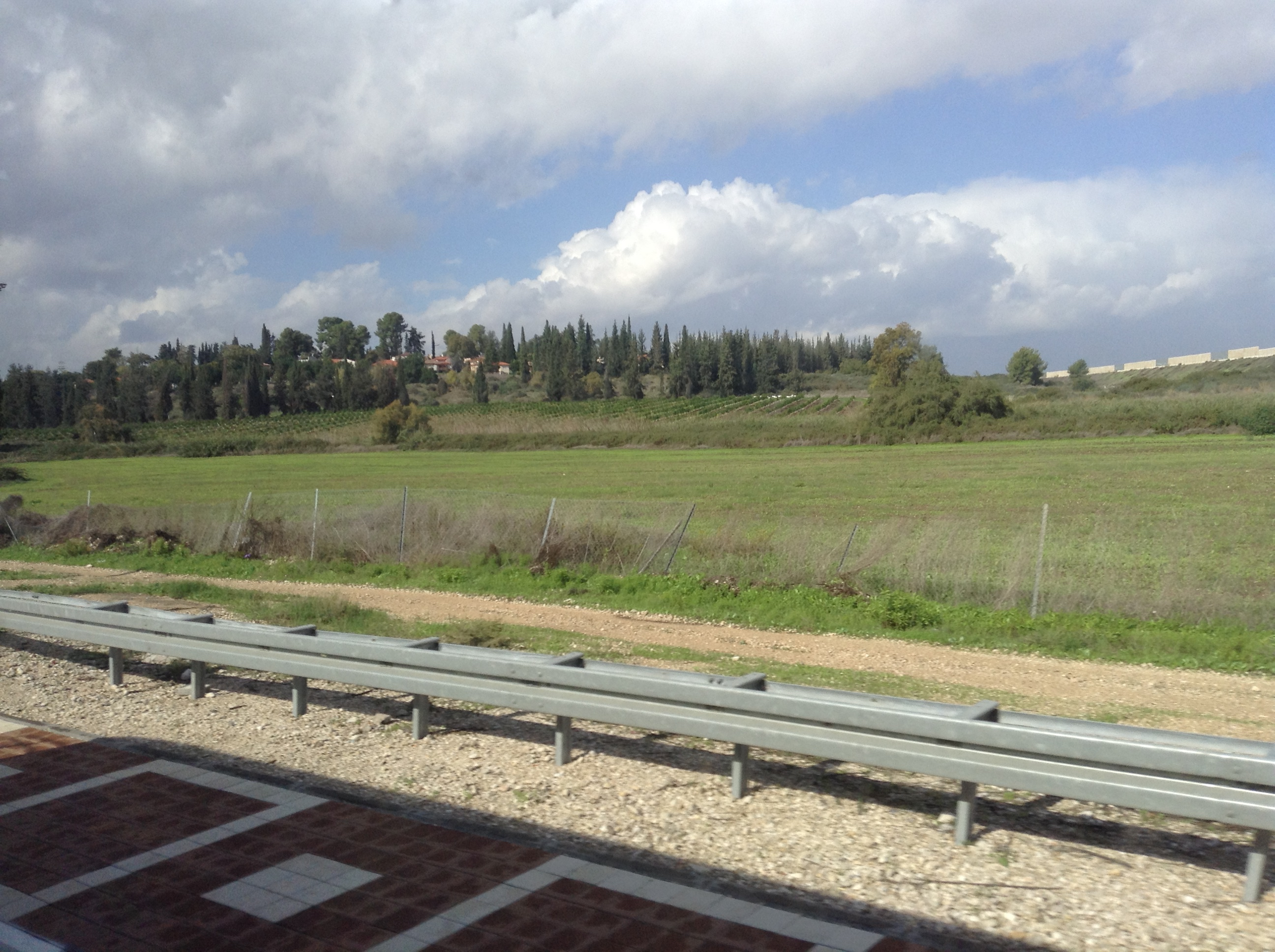
The route from Jerusalem to Ashdod

The Southern District (Hebrew: מָחוֹז הדָּרוֹם, Meḥoz HaDarom; Arabic: لواء الجنوب) is one of Israel's six administrative districts, the largest in terms of land area but the most sparsely populated. It covers most of the Negev desert, as well as the Arava valley. The population of the Southern District is 1,444,259 and its area is 14,185 km^{2}. Its population is 79.66% Jewish and 12.72% Arab (mostly Muslim), with 7.62% of other origins.

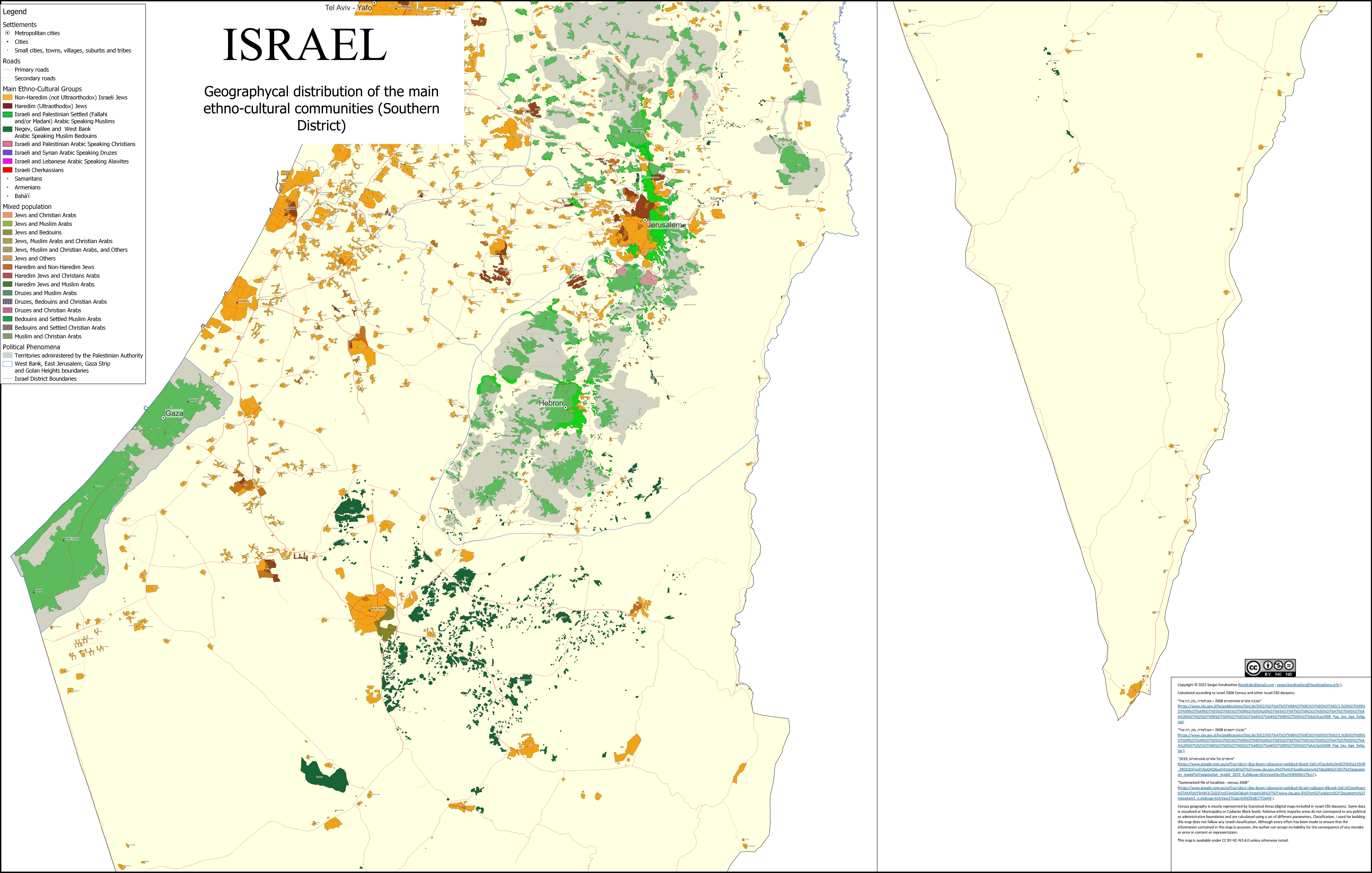
Geographical distribution of the main ethno-cultural communities in the Southern District in 2008.

The district capital is Beersheba, while the largest city is Ashdod. Beersheba's dormitory towns of Omer, Meitar, and Lehavim are affluent relative to other Israeli cities, while the development towns of Dimona, Sderot, Netivot, Ofakim, and Yeruham and the seven Bedouin cities are lower on the socio-economic scale.

== Demographics ==
Historical population
Year	Pop.	±%
1972	326,000	—
1983	425,800	+30.6%
1995	646,000	+51.7%
2008	1,053,960	+63.2%
2022	1,418,256	+34.6%
2024	1,444,259	+1.8%

== Administrative local authorities ==
Subdistricts and Natural Regions
Ashkelon (Natural regions: Ashdod · Ashkelon · Lakhish · Malakhi); Beersheba (Natural regions: Arava · Be'er Sheva · Besor · Dead Sea · Gerar · Northern Negev Mountains · Southern Negev Mountains)
Cities	Local Councils	Regional Councils
Arad; Ashdod; Ashkelon; Beersheba; Dimona; Eilat; Kiryat Gat; Kiryat Malakhi; Netivot; Ofakim; Rahat; Sderot	Ar'arat an-Naqab; Hura; Kuseife; Lakiya; Lehavim; Meitar; Mitzpe Ramon; Omer; Shaqib al-Salam; Tel as-Sabi; Yeruham	Al-Kasom; Be'er Tuvia; Bnei Shimon; Central Arava; Eshkol; Hevel Eilot; Hof Ashkelon; Lakhish; Merhavim; Neve Midbar; Ramat HaNegev; Sdot Negev (Azata); Sha'ar HaNegev; Shafir; Tamar; Yoav

Some villages do not fall under the jurisdiction of a regional council. These include:

- Mahane Yatir
- Umm al-Hiran (unrecognised Bedouin village)

== See also ==
- List of cities in Israel
- Arab localities in Israel
- Gaza Strip
