= Israel Central Bureau of Statistics =

Data research office of the Israeli government

- הלשכה המרכזית לסטטיסטיקה
- Abbreviation: CBS
- Formation: 1949; 77 years ago
- Headquarters: Givat Shaul, Jerusalem
- Website: www.cbs.gov.il/en

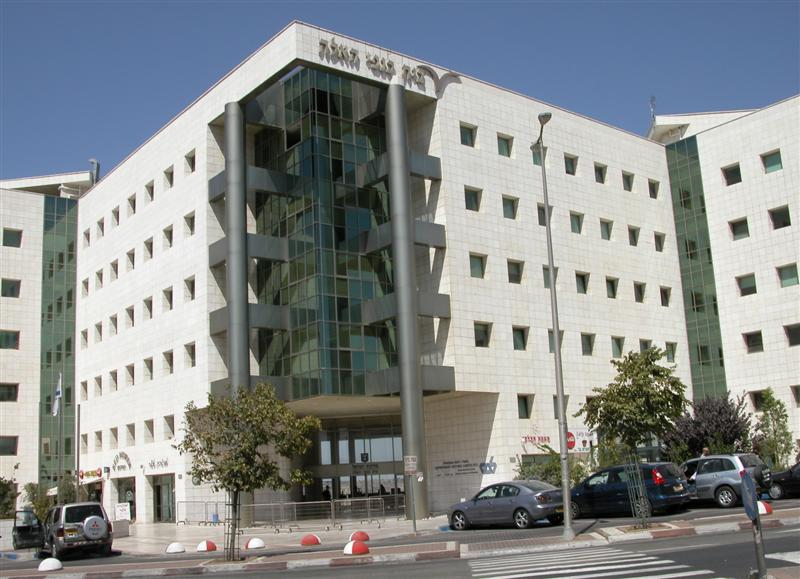
CBS Building in Jerusalem

The Israel Central Bureau of Statistics (Hebrew: הלשכה המרכזית לסטטיסטיקה, HaLishka HaMerkazit LiStatistika; Arabic: دائرة الإحصاء المركزية الإسرائيلية), abbreviated CBS, is an Israeli government office established in 1949 to carry out research and publish statistical data on all aspects of Israeli life, including population, society, economy, industry, education, and physical infrastructure.

The CBS is headquartered in the Givat Shaul neighborhood of Jerusalem, with another branch in Tel Aviv.

== Overview ==
The CBS is headed by the National Statistician (previously named Government Statistician), who is appointed on the recommendation of the prime minister. Professor Emeritus Danny Pfefferman of Hebrew University has served in that position and as Director of the CBS since 2013. The bureau's annual budget in 2011 was NIS 237 million.

The work of the CBS follows internationally accepted standards which enable comparison of statistical information with other countries. It gathers current, monthly, quarterly and annually data on the national economy (production, consumption, capital formation, labor productivity, savings), the balance of payments and foreign trade, the activity of different economic branches (agriculture, manufacturing, construction, transport, commerce and services, etc.), the price of goods and services, the population, family size, employment, education, health, crime, government services and more. The CBS also conducts a Census of Population and Housing every ten years, as well as periodic and one-time surveys on a variety of subjects.

The work of CBS is overseen by the Public Commission of Statistics. The data is disseminated in a wide variety of publications, among them the Statistical Abstract of Israel. Current and updated statistical information is brought to the public's attention through daily press releases. Government ministries use the data collected by CBS for policymaking, planning and tracking development. The data is also made available to academic research institutions and the general public.

== See also ==
- List of regions of Israel and Palestine by life expectancy
