= Beersheba Subdistrict =

Coordinates: 31.2589°N 34.7978°E

Beersheba Subdistrict נפת באר שבע قضاء بئر السبع
- Subdistrict
- Interactive map of Beersheba Subdistrict
- Country: Israel
- District: Southern

Area
  - Total: 12,918 km^{2} (4,988 sq mi)

Population (2024)
  - Total: 815,575 (Note: This statistic is incomplete, as it does not include Bedouins who lived in unrecognized villages.)

Ethnicity
  - Jews and others: 65.1%
  - Arabs: 34.8%

Beersheba Subdistrict is the southernmost sub-district of Israel and one of two sub-districts of the Southern District in the Negev. The largest city and capital of the sub-district is the metropolis of Beersheba. Spanning approximately 12,918 km^{2} (4,988 sq mi), it is the largest sub-district by land area, and had more than 800,000 residents in 2024. The population is composed of a mixture of Jews and Arabs.

== History ==
Beersheba finds mention in the Bible. It was under the Byzantine rule from 4th to 7th century CE before being captured by the Arabs. It was later became part of the Ottoman Empire in the 16th century. Beersheba and Gaza are referred to as "Bilad Ghazzeh" in the records left by Napoleon in the 19th century, at which time the territory was ruled by Arab Bedouin clans with a documented social structure. The modern city of Beersheba was founded in 1900. The Arab clans sent soldiers to fight for the Ottoman Empire during the First World War. The Beersheba district was the largest district during the British Mandate of Palestine and underwent administrative reorganization after the formation of the State of Israel in 1948.

== Geography ==
Beersheba is the southernmost sub-district of Israel and one of two sub-districts of the Southern District. Spanning approximately 12,918 km^{2} (4,988 sq mi), it is the largest sub-district by land area, and stretches from central Israel to Eilat in the southern tip. The largest city is the metropolis of Beersheba. It borders the Aqaba Governorate of Jordan, Gaza Strip and West Bank of Palestine, the Sinai Peninsula of Egypt, and the Ashkelon Subdistrict of Israel.

Beersheba is part of the broader Negev desert, with the city of Beersheba, the largest city in the Israeli Negev. The region has low rainfall with certain areas receiving 100–300 mm (3.9–11.8 in) of rainfall annually and an annual precipitation less than 100 mm (3.9 in) in the southern part of the region.

== Demographics ==
As of 2016, the subdistrict had 703,700 residents. It had an estimated population of 806,700 in 2021 with the Beersheba metropolis accounting for 211,251 inhabitants. The population today is composed of approximately 75% Jewish and remaining Arabs. The sub-district hosts almost half of Israel's total Bedouin population and virtually all of the Negev's Bedouin population. The Bedouins, who were largely limited to tents in camps in specific areas since 1960, transitioned from traditional pastoral lifestyles to semi-urbanized towns since the 1960s.

Historical population
Year	Pop.	±%
1972	170,900	—
1983	224,900	+31.6%
1995	322,800	+43.5%
2008	589,860	+82.7%
2022	826,164	+40.1%
2024	815,575	−1.3%

== Administrative local authorities ==
Cities	Local Councils	Regional Councils
Arad; Beersheba; Dimona; Eilat; Netivot; Ofakim; Rahat	Ar'arat an-Naqab; Hura; Kuseife; Lakiya; Lehavim; Meitar; Mitzpe Ramon; Omer; Shaqib al-Salam; Tel as-Sabi; Yeruham	Al-Kasom; Bnei Shimon; Central Arava; Eshkol; Hevel Eilot; Merhavim; Neve Midbar; Ramat HaNegev; Sdot Negev (Azata); Tamar

== Economy ==
Beersheba serves as a regional hub for commerce, services, education, and technology, attracting both residents and investors. The region is a cultural and tourism hub, driven by heritage tourism, theaters, galleries, and university-linked innovation centers. Desert-adapted agriculture is practiced during favorable seasons in areas with nominal rainfall. Wages in the Southern District tend to be lower than national averages with a higher rate of unemployment.

== Transportation ==
The sub-district is part of the Israel Railways transit network, and is served by a major railway line from Tel Aviv to Beersheba, which further extends to Dimona and other freight routes in the south. Major highways run through the region, connecting it to other cities in Israel. Bus operators such as Metropoline and Dan Be’er Sheva provide extensive intercity and intra-metropolitan routes. Teyman airfield offers general aviation services in the north while Ramon Airport serves the southern region.

== Voting Patterns ==
In the 2022 election, 52 percent of voters in the subdistrict voted for the parties of the right-wing coalition led by Benjamin Netanyahu, while 25 percent voted for the parties of the center-left coalition led by Yair Lapid, and 23 percent voted for the Arab parties.

In the 2026 election, 42 percent of voters in the subdistrict voted for the parties of the right-wing coalition led by Benjamin Netanyahu, while 33 percent voted for the Arab parties and 21 percent voted for the parties of the center-left coalition led by Gadi Eisenkot. An additional 2.1 percent voted for the Reservists, and 1.3 percent voted for Amcha Yisrael. Voter turnout increased 34 percent from the 2022 election.

== Natural Regions ==
Districts, Subdistricts and Natural Regions of the State of Israel, 2018

- 621 Gerar
  - Population (2024): 80,268
  - Largest city: Netivot
- 622 Besor
  - Population (2024): 68,766
  - Largest city: Ofakim
- 623 Be'er Sheva
  - Population (2024): 527,255
  - Largest city: Beersheba
- 624 Dead Sea
  - Population (2024): 1,775
  - Largest city: Ein Gedi
- 625 Arava
  - Population (2024): 67,489
  - Largest city: Eilat
- 626 Northern Negev Mountains
  - Population (2024): 69,445
  - Largest city: Dimona
- 627 Southern Negev Mountains
  - Population (2024): 577
  - Largest city: Ne'ot Smadar
