= HomeBiogas =

Israeli biogas company

HomeBiogas is a biogas company based in Beit Yanai, Israel. The company produces and sells anaerobic digesters that convert organic waste into methane gas and liquid fertilizer.

== Founding ==
In 2007, HomeBioGas cofounder Yair Teller observed small biogas systems in Mexico. Inspired, he traveled to other developing nations to learn more.

Teller, and cofounder Oshik Efrati, acquired many biogas systems from China and India. They installed them locally, quickly judging them to work poorly. Particularly, Teller and Efrati believed these systems suffered from poor efficiency, unpleasant odors and insect infestations.

In 2012, Teller and Efrati, now joined by final co-founder Erez Lancer, formally created HomeBiogas.

== Partnerships ==
Israel's Ministry of Environmental Protection, in 2014, purchased HomeBiogas units, distributing them to Umm Batin Bedouin village. Shortly afterwards, the Ministry purchased 25 additional systems and again distributed them to Umm Batin, and another Negev Bedouin village. Similarly, HomeBiogas has also supplied biodigesters to Bedouins in the Negev in conjunction with the Arava Institute for Environmental Studies.

After learning of the Umm Batin program, multiple governments reached out to HomeBiogas. Prominent among them is the Dominican Republic, whose government purchased 500 HomeBiogas appliances in an effort to reduce citizen dependence on wood for heating.

The European Union and the Peres Center for Peace contracted HomeBiogas to install HomeBiogas digesters in the central West Bank's Jordan Valley in 2015. Approximately 40 digesters were installed, with the European Union providing the 500,000 euros in funding.

== Commercialization ==
In January 2016, HomeBiogas expanded into the domestic sector, launching an Indiegogo campaign. The campaign reached its goal of $100,000 in the first 24 hours, eventually culminating in over $250,000 raised. These first commercial units shipped in May, 2016.

== HomeBiogas appliance ==
The HomeBiogas system generates biogas by anaerobically fermenting organic matter. Types of acceptable organic matter include meat, dairy, and animal manure, as well. The anaerobic digestion is achieved by bacteria living inside the system. As a result, HomeBiogas runs without electricity.

As of 2016, HomeBiogas can receive inputs of up to six liters per day of food waste, or up to 15 liters per day of animal manure. Each kilogram may produce 200 liters of biogas, enough fuel for an hour of cooking.

== Environmental impact ==
Annually, each HomeBiogas system may eliminate up to one ton of organic waste, and six tons of carbon dioxide. Since its inception and up to June 2022, the green tech company prevented about 86,000 tons of CO_{2} emissions by processing around 15,000 tons of organic waste.
