= Tarabin =

Tarabin may refer to:

== Places ==
- Tirabin al-Sana, a Bedouin village in Israel
- Nuweiba, a resort in Sinai, Egypt

== People ==
- Tarabin bedouin
- Dmitriy Tarabin, Russian athlete
