= Al-Sayyid, Israel =

Village in southern Israel

al-Sayyid: א-סייד (Hebrew); السيد (Arabic)
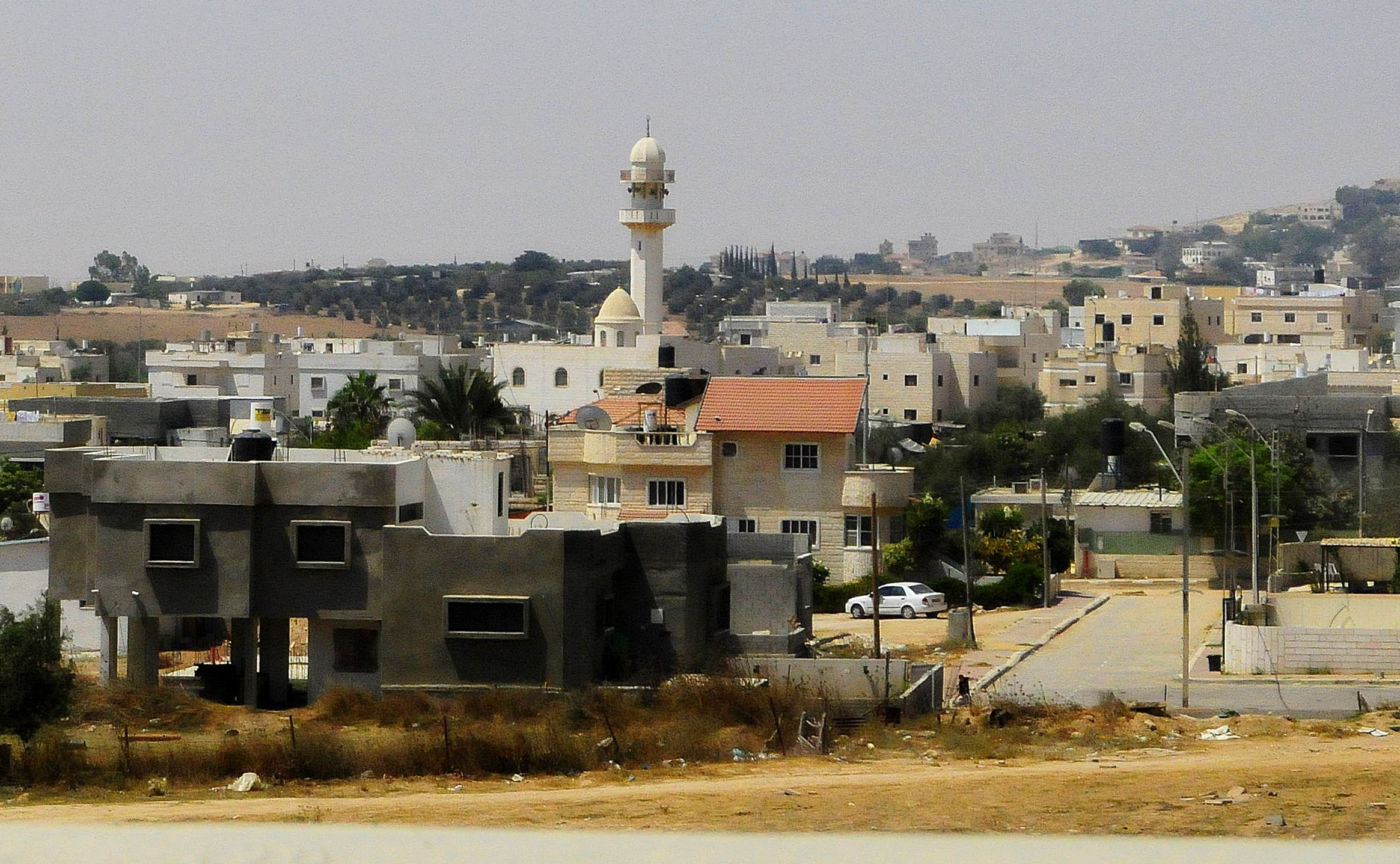
- Entrance to al-Sayyid

- Location within Northern Negev region of Israel Location within Israel
- Coordinates: 31°17′04″N 34°54′58″E
- Country: Israel
- District: Southern
- Subdistrict: Beersheba
- Council: al-Kasom
- Population (2024): 6,109

Al-Sayyid or al-Sayed (Arabic: السيد; Hebrew: א-סייד) is a Bedouin village in Israel. Located in the Negev desert between Arad and Beersheba and just south of Hura, it falls under the jurisdiction of al-Kasom Regional Council. In 2024 the village's population was 6,109.

== History ==
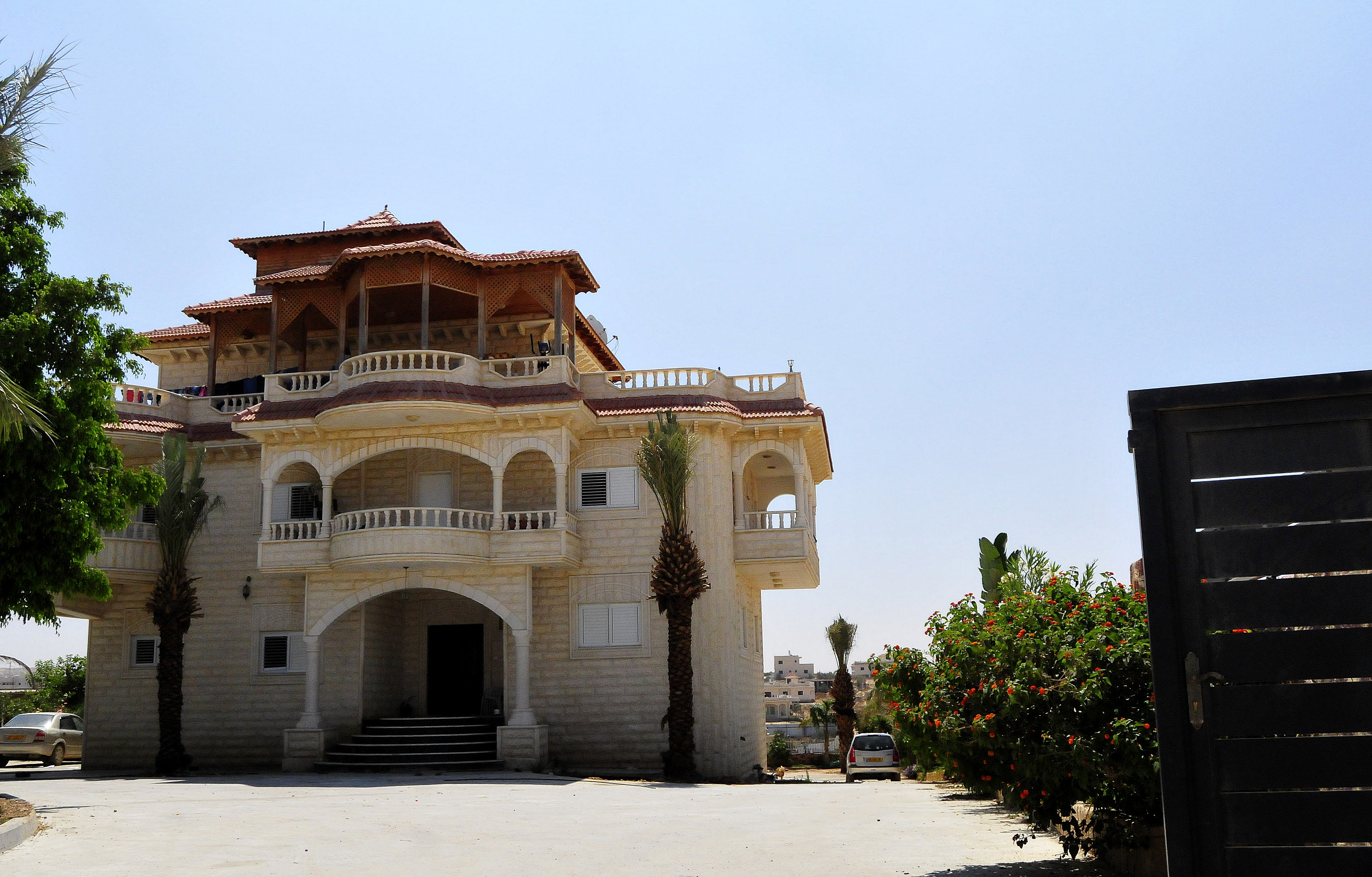
Private residence in al-Sayyid

The tribe's oral history tells that its first leader moved to the area from Egypt with his wife (of local origin) some time in the beginning of the 19th century. They settled amongst the other Bedouin tribes around Beersheba and lived off the land. However, other tribes refused to marry their daughters to the al-Sayyids, who were known as "the foreign fellahin." Eventually the head of the tribe managed to marry his sons to women from the Gaza area. However, their low social status meant that they continued to be rejected locally, and so the next generation began to marry cousins, a trend that continued for five generations. Even today other tribes continue to veto marriage ties with the al-Sayyids.

The social differences between the tribe and its neighbours led to opposition to plans to include the village within the municipality of the nearby city of Hura (that was established in 1989). Instead, the village was placed under the jurisdiction of Abu Basma Regional Council. It was officially recognized following Government Resolution 881 on 29 September 2003, which created eight new Bedouin settlements (seven of which were to be located in the Abu Basma Regional Council).

== Demographics ==
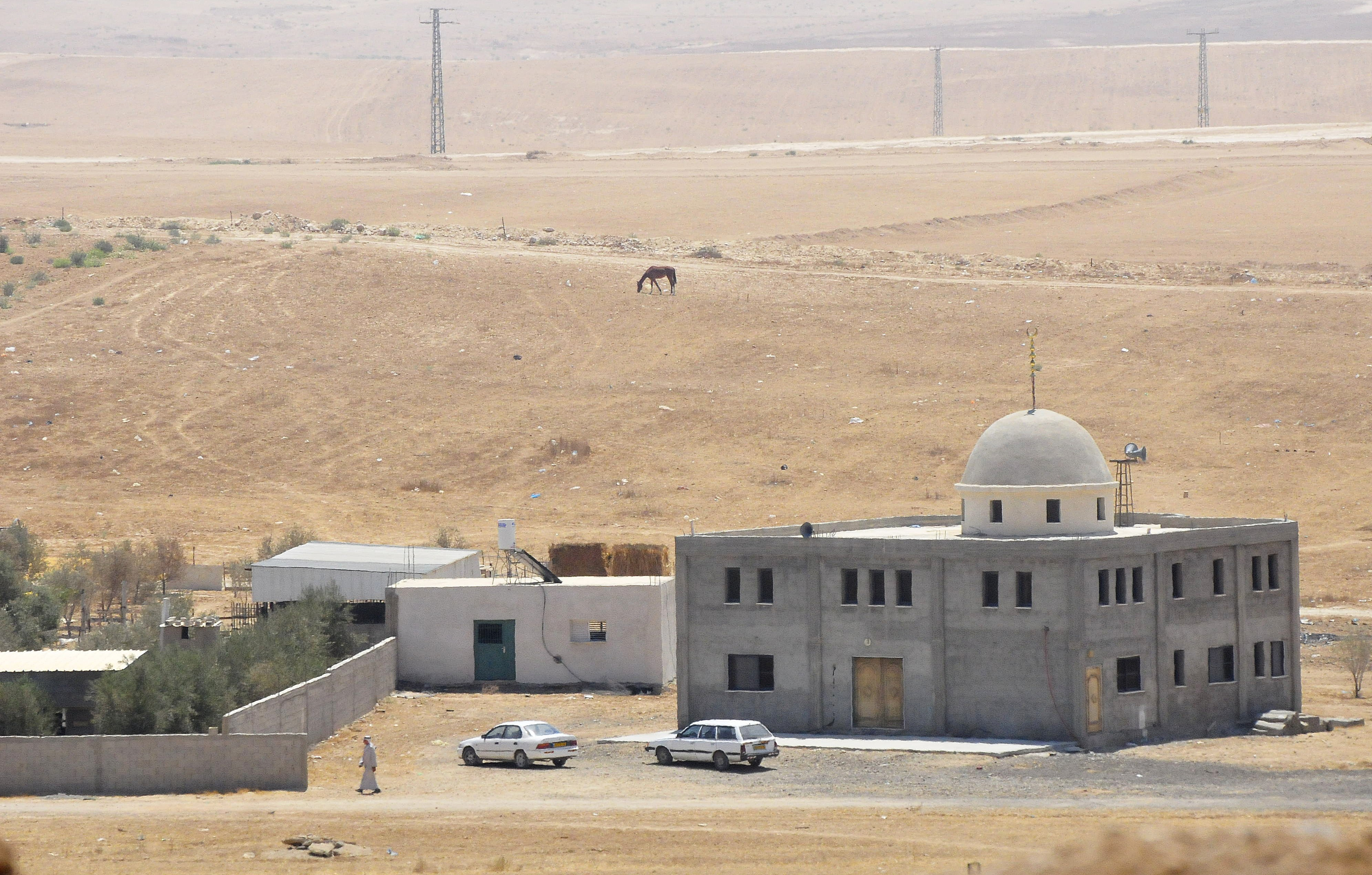
A mosque in Al-Sayyid

Al-Sayyid is mainly populated by members of the al-Sayyid tribe, who are noted for the high levels of deafness amongst their population and their subsequent development of the al-Sayyid Bedouin Sign Language, which is used by many of the hearing villagers as well as the deaf. Five percent of the tribe (150 of the 3,000 as of 2004) are deaf, compared to a usual rate of 0.1%. One suggested cause is the high level of inbreeding within the tribe; 27% of marriages are between cousins, and 65% are between couples related in some way, and a quarter of the population carries the deafness gene. This is attributed to the tribe's historical isolation in the area. There is a presumption that a recessive gene for profound deafness is traced back to sons of the "founding" couple, two of whose five sons were deaf.

== Infrastructure and public services ==
Since 2004, when the village was recognized, there was a significant infrastructure improvement. Several new school buildings were erected. Today there are three elementary schools and two high schools in al-Sayyid. The nearest university is Ben-Gurion University of the Negev in Beersheba.

Village residents receive medical service from medical clinic Leumit, there are additional medical clinics and Tipat Halav perinatal baby care centers in the nearby township of Hura.

== Sign language ==
The phenomenon of an Al-Sayyid Bedouin Sign Language was first revealed in 1990 by anthropologist Shifra Kisch, and it became well known in 2005 when an international team of researchers from different universities, including the University of Haifa, headed by Wendy Sandler, started to study this unique sign language. Margalit Fox, a journalist for The New York Times, wrote a book about it, called Talking Hands: What Sign Language Reveals About the Mind, published in 2007.

== Voting Patterns ==
In the 2026 election, 98 percent of voters in al-Sayyid voted for the Arab parties, while 1 percent voted for the parties of the center-left coalition led by Gadi Eisenkot and 0.8 percent voted for the parties of the right-wing coalition led by Benjamin Netanyahu. Among the voters for the Arab parties, 96 percent voted for Ra'am, while 4 percent voted for the Joint List. Voter turnout roughly doubled compared with the 2022 election.

== Gallery ==
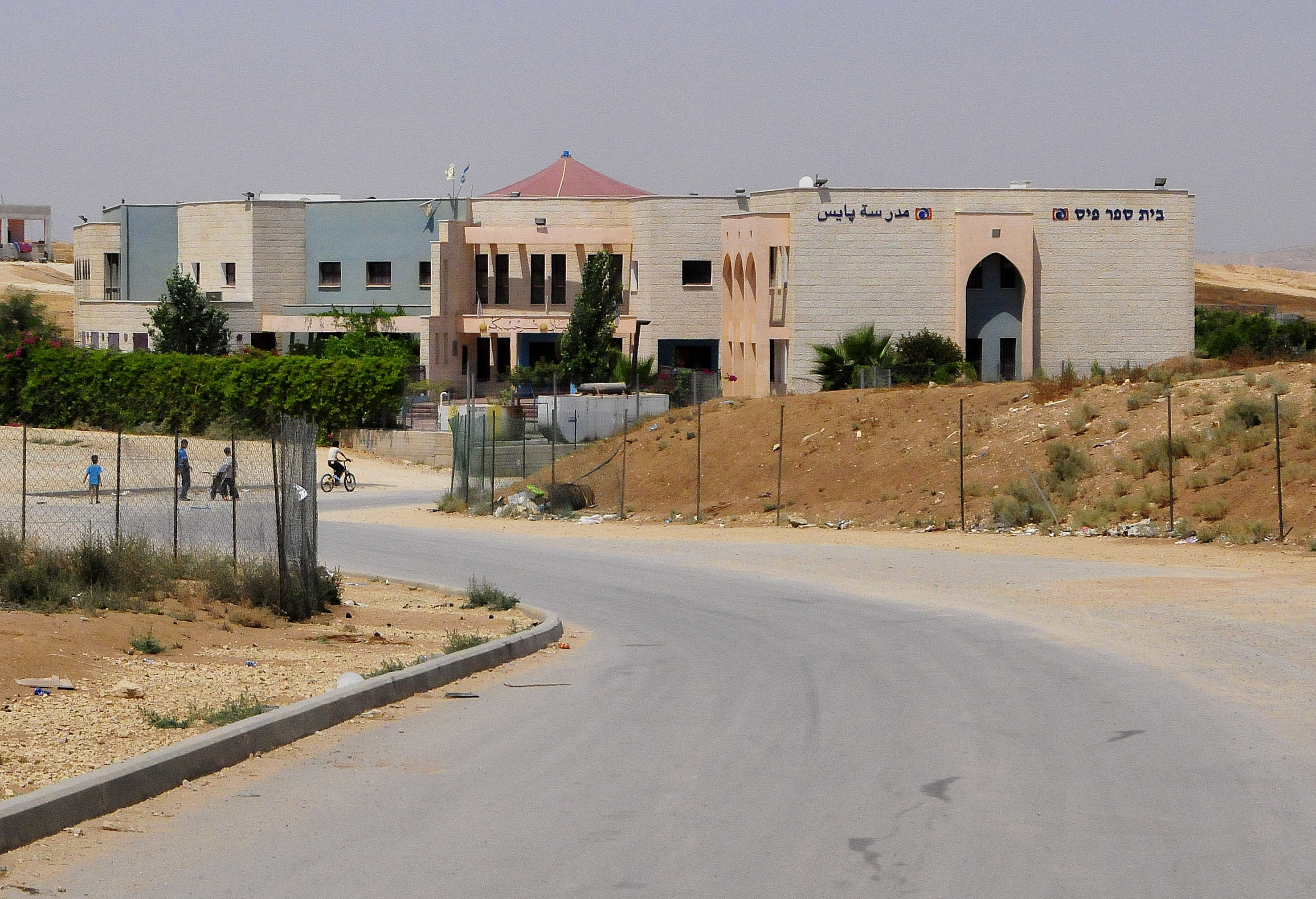
One of al-Sayyid schools

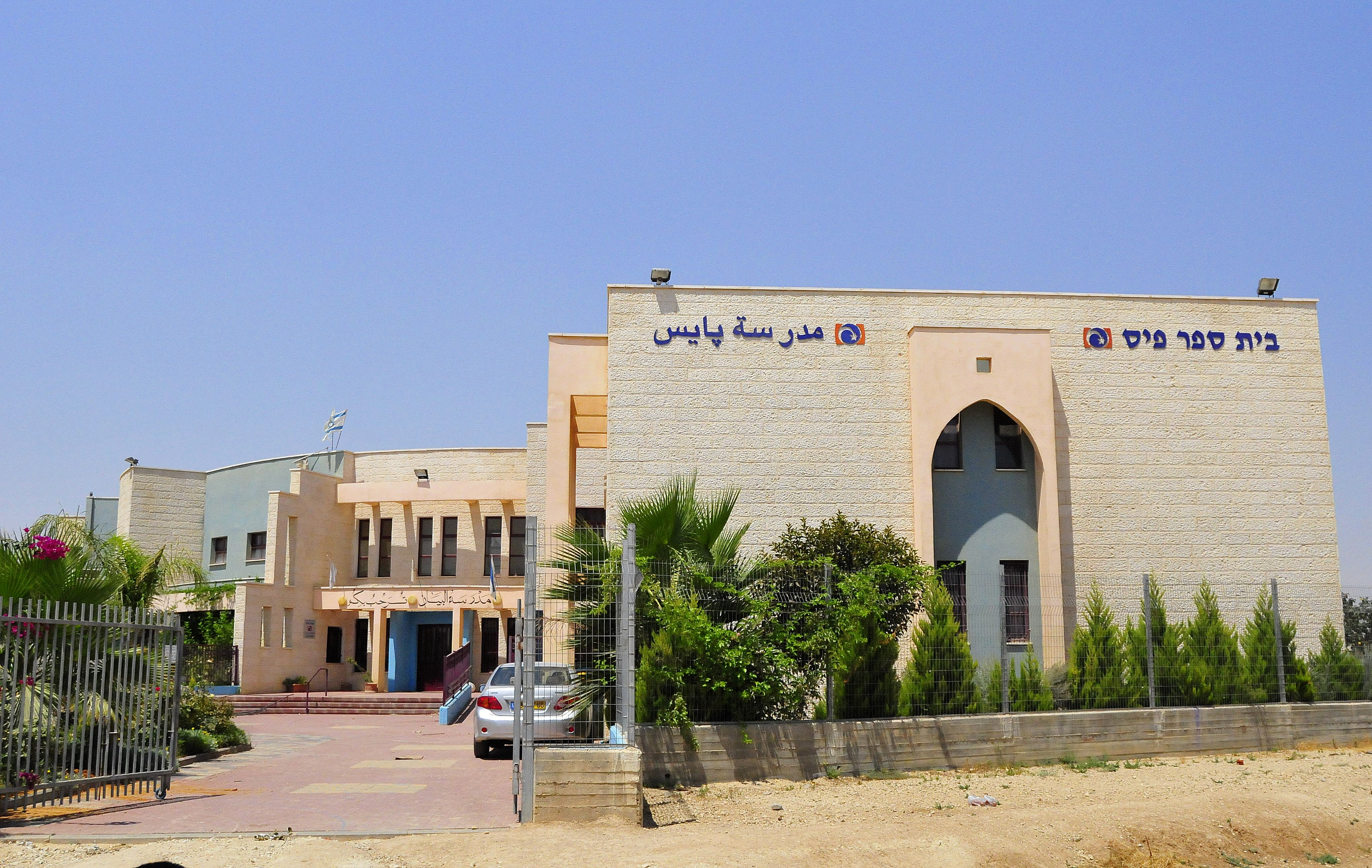
One of al-Sayyid schools

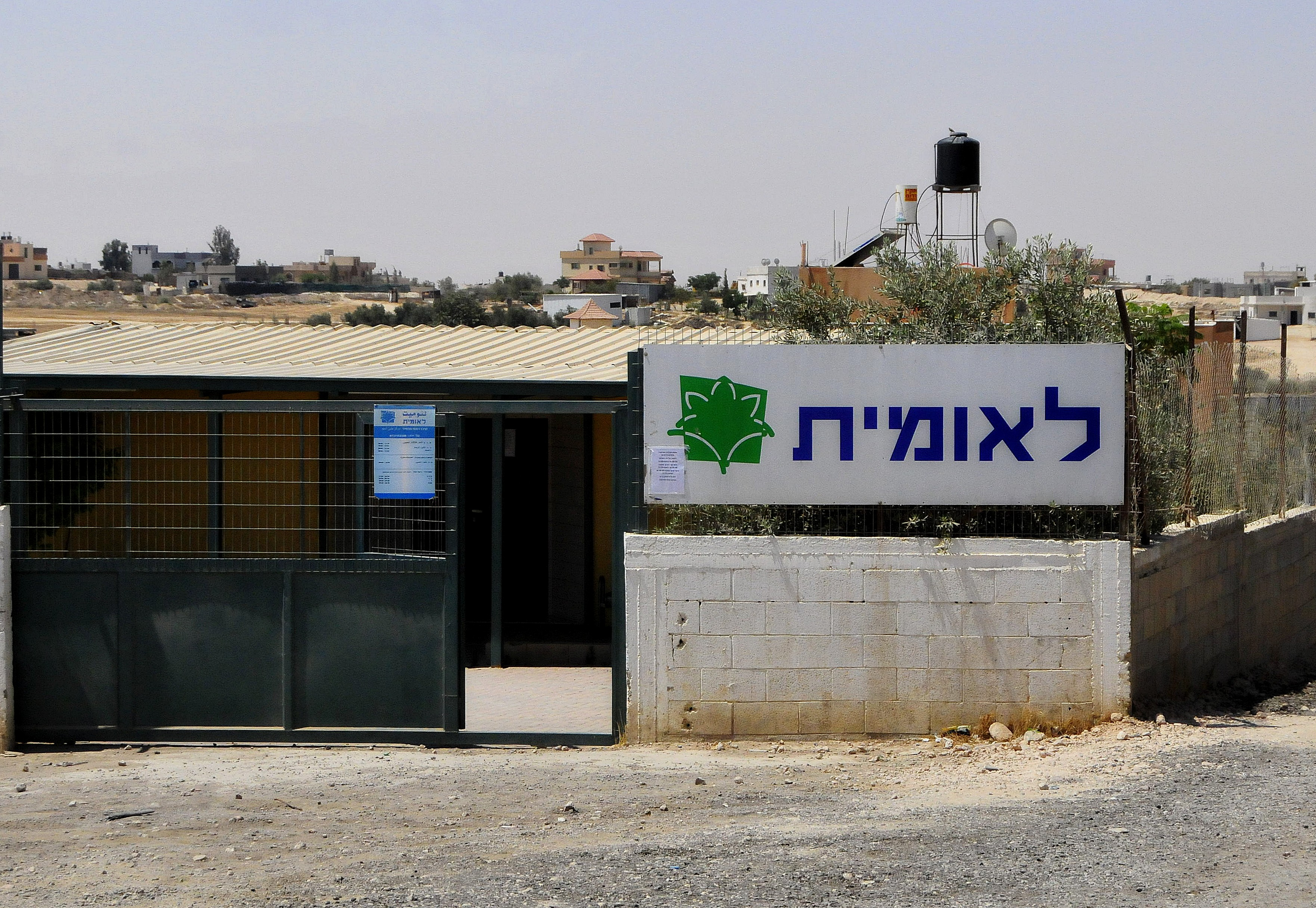
A medical clinic in al-Sayyid

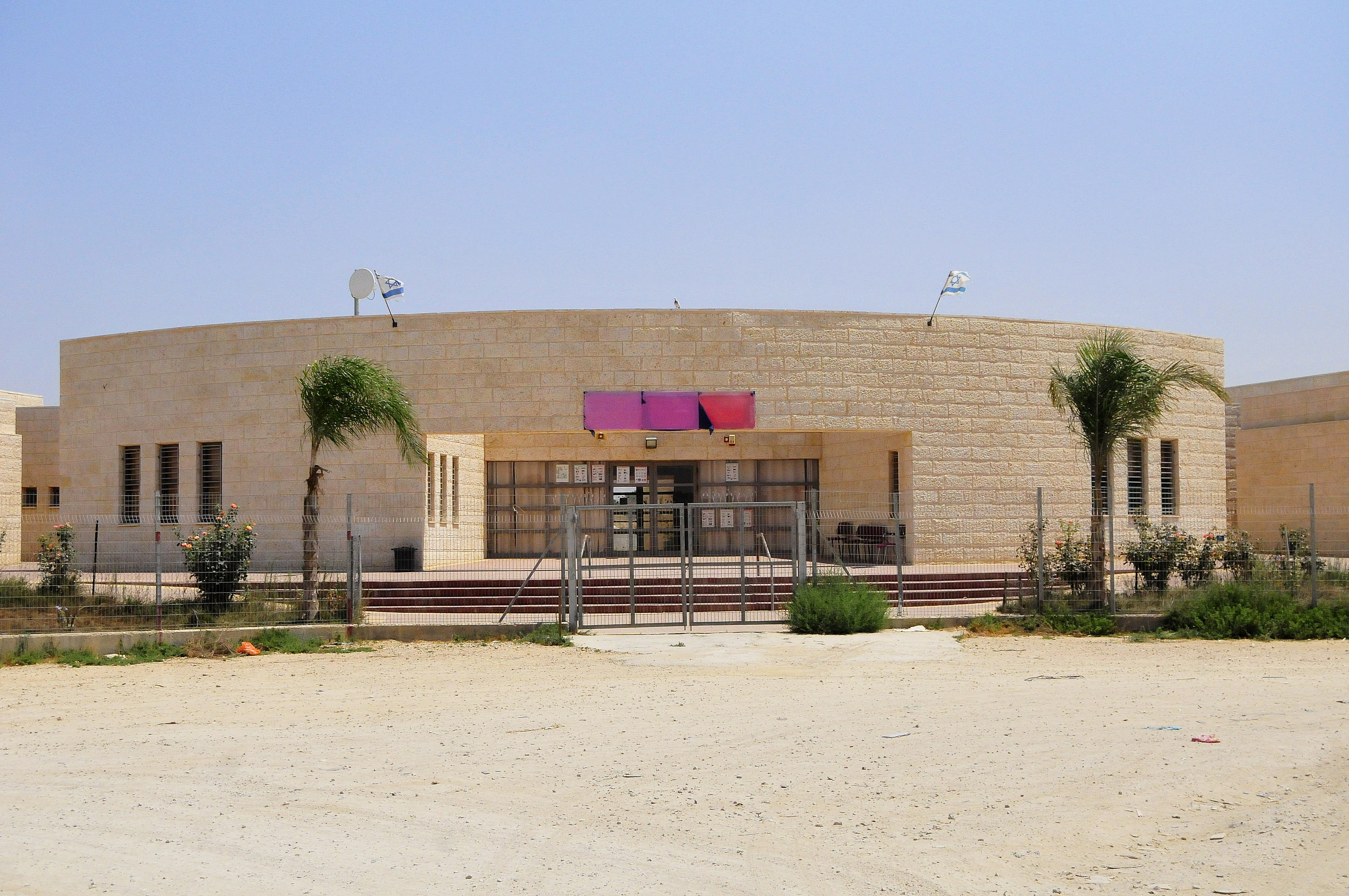
One of al-Sayyid schools

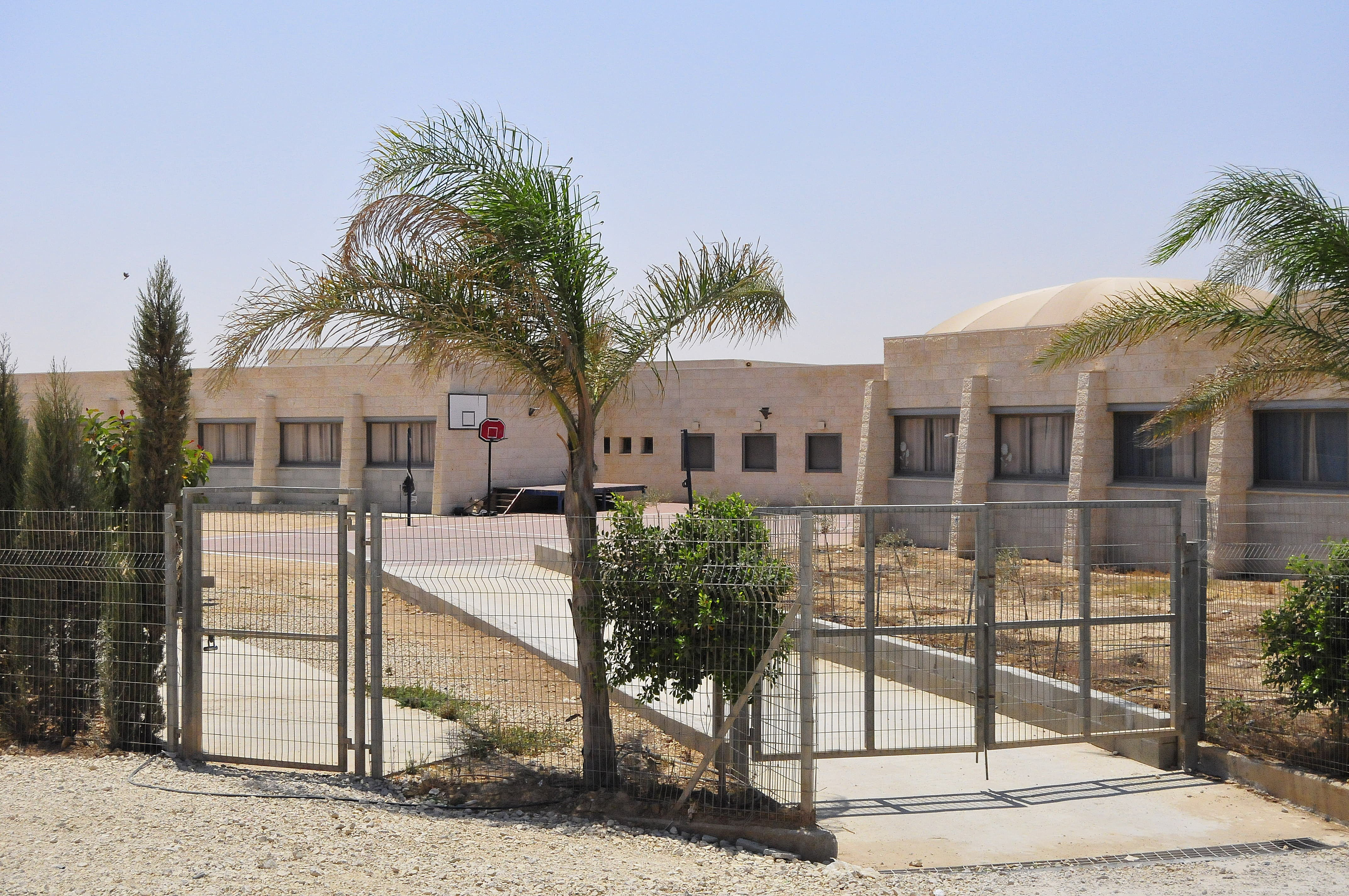
One of al-Sayyid schools

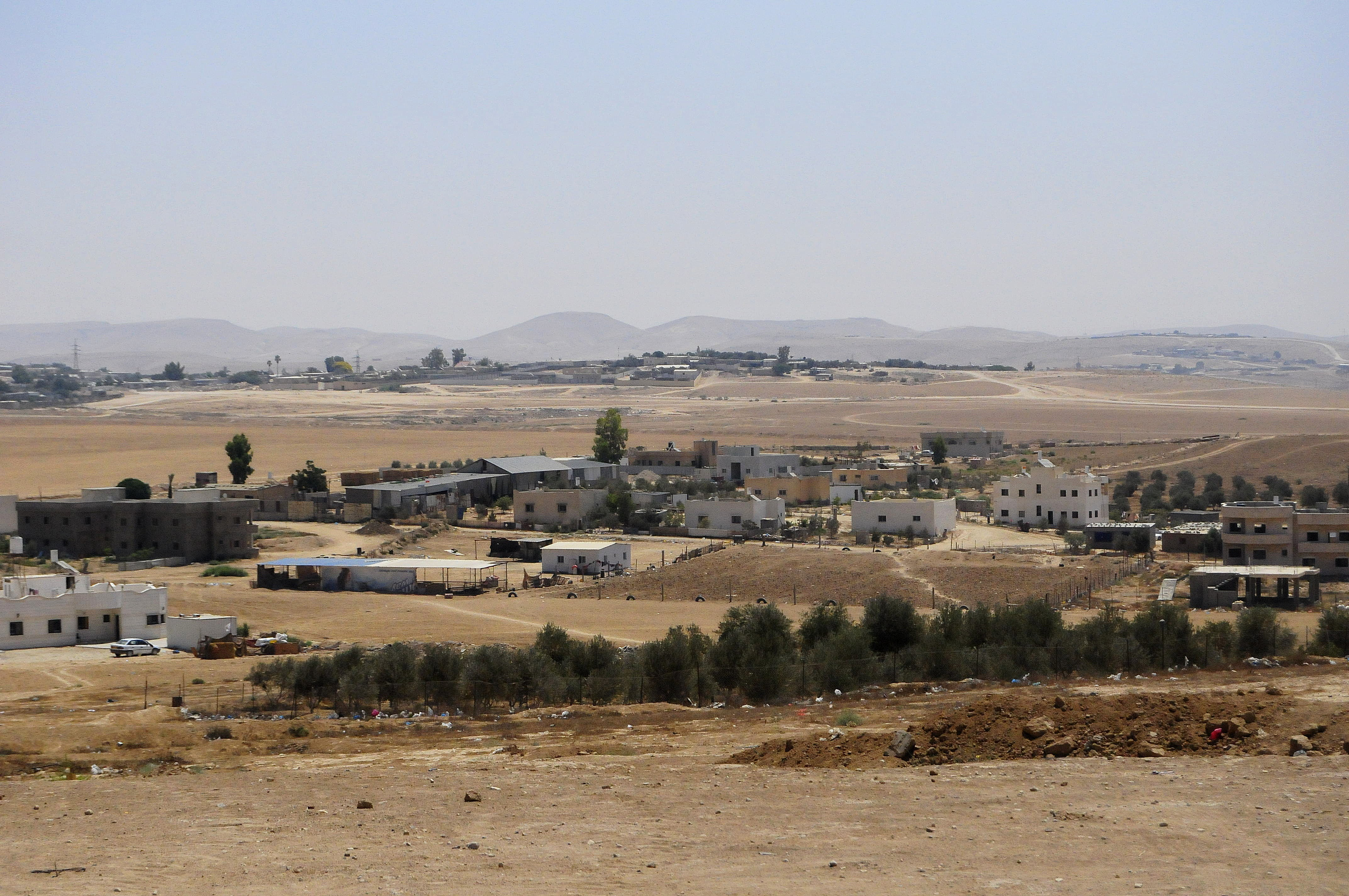
al-Sayyid view 1

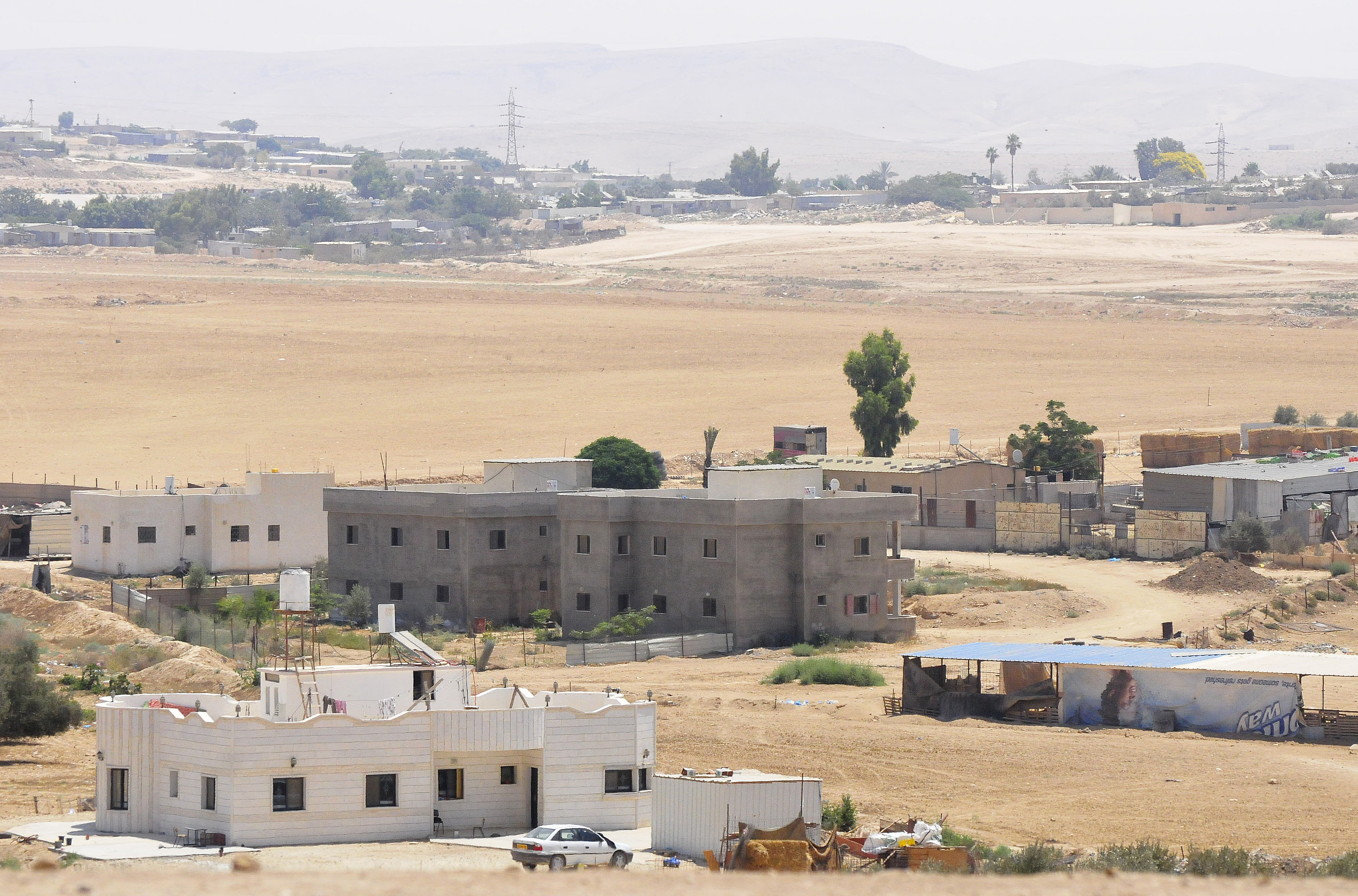
al-Sayyid view 2

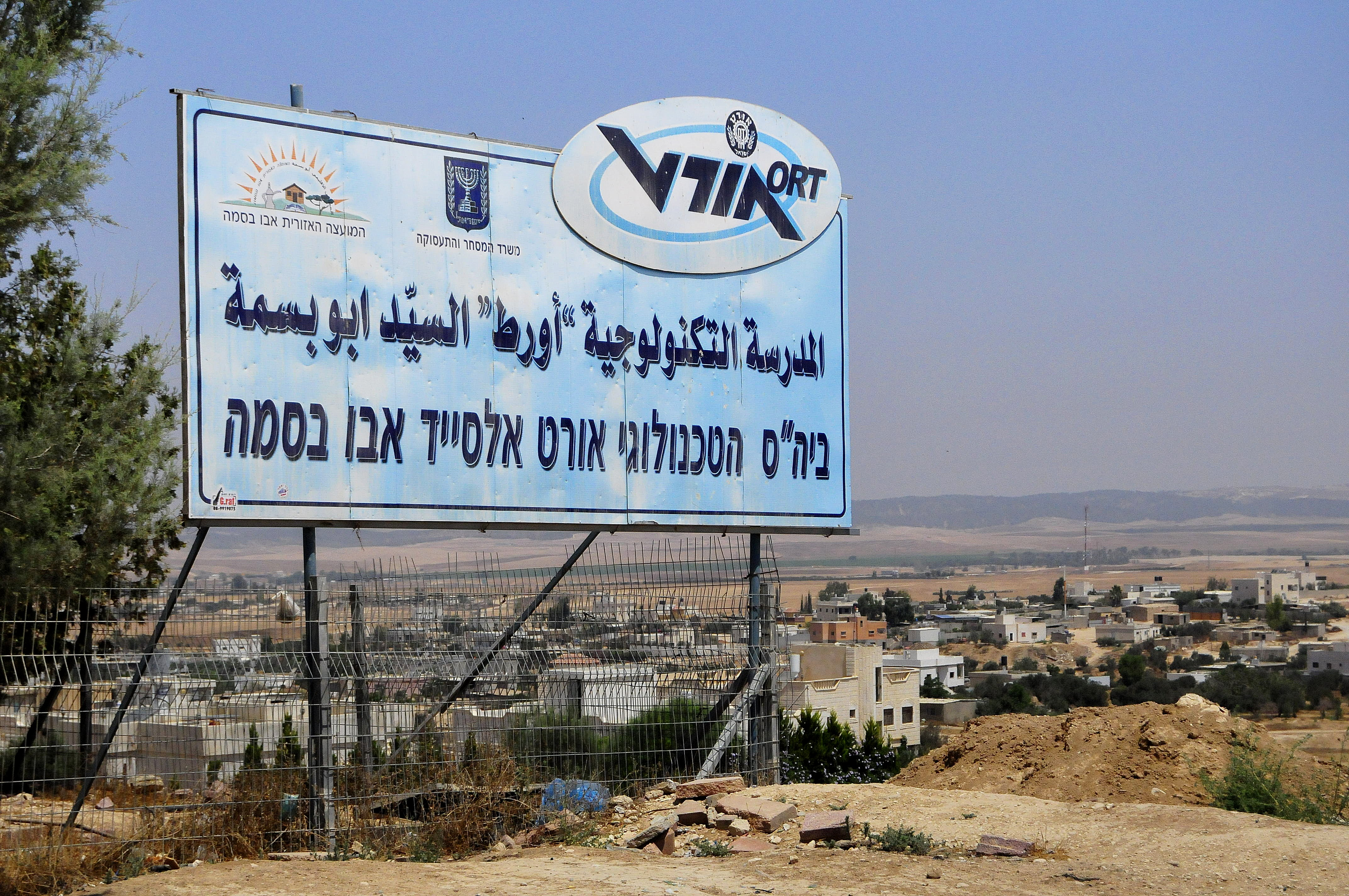
A technical ORT school in al-Sayyid

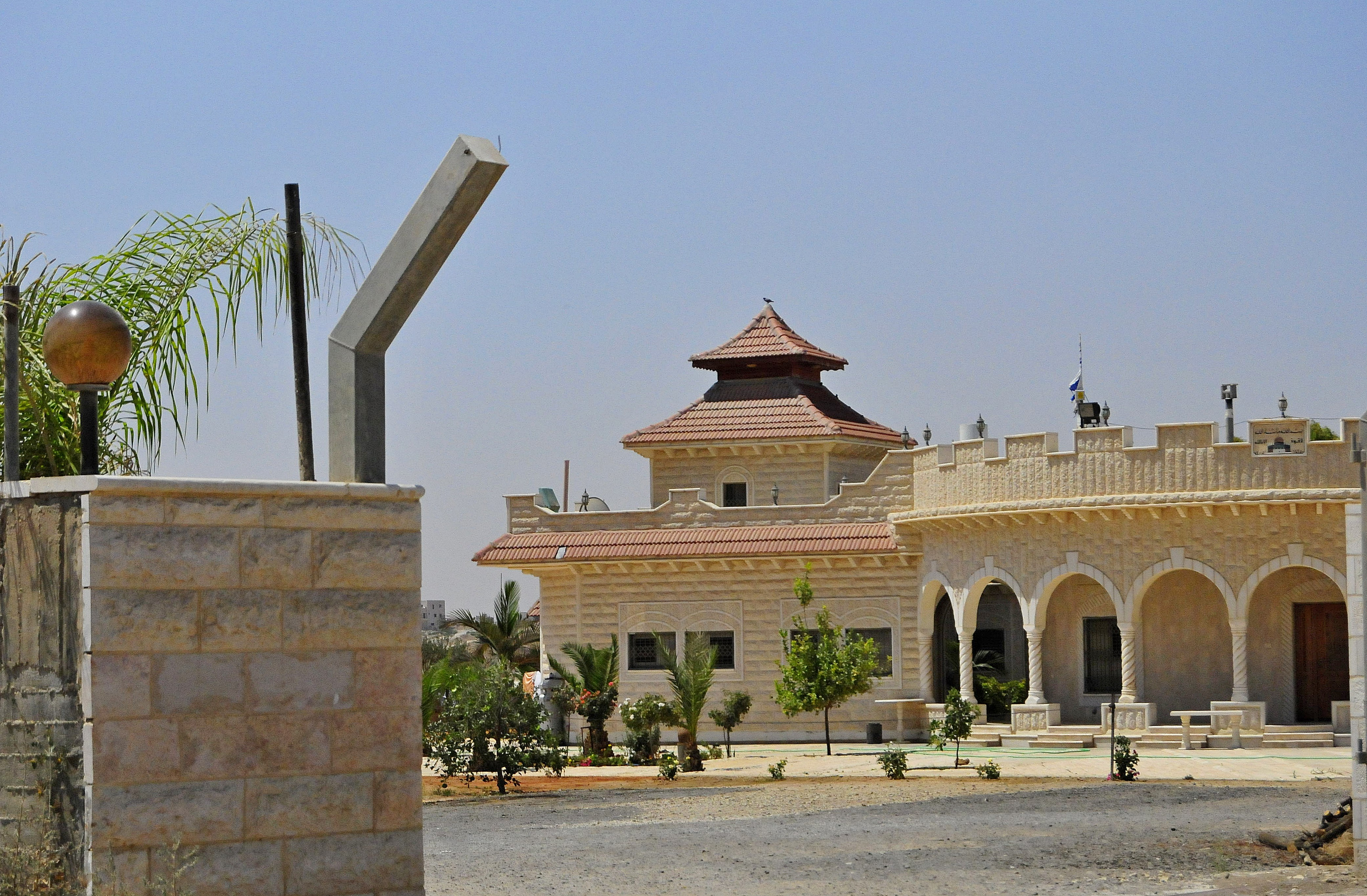
A private house in al-Sayyid

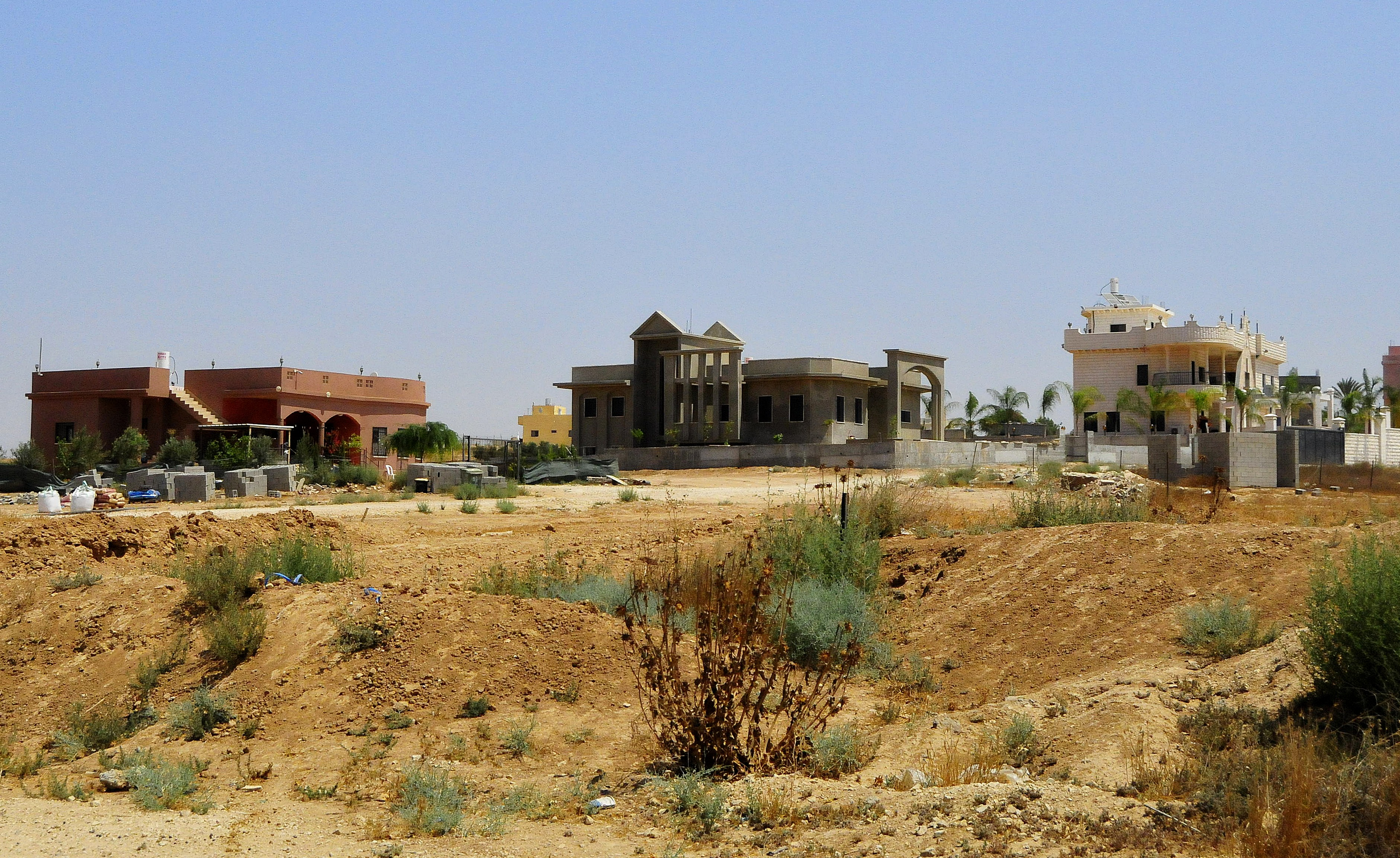
Houses in al-Sayyid

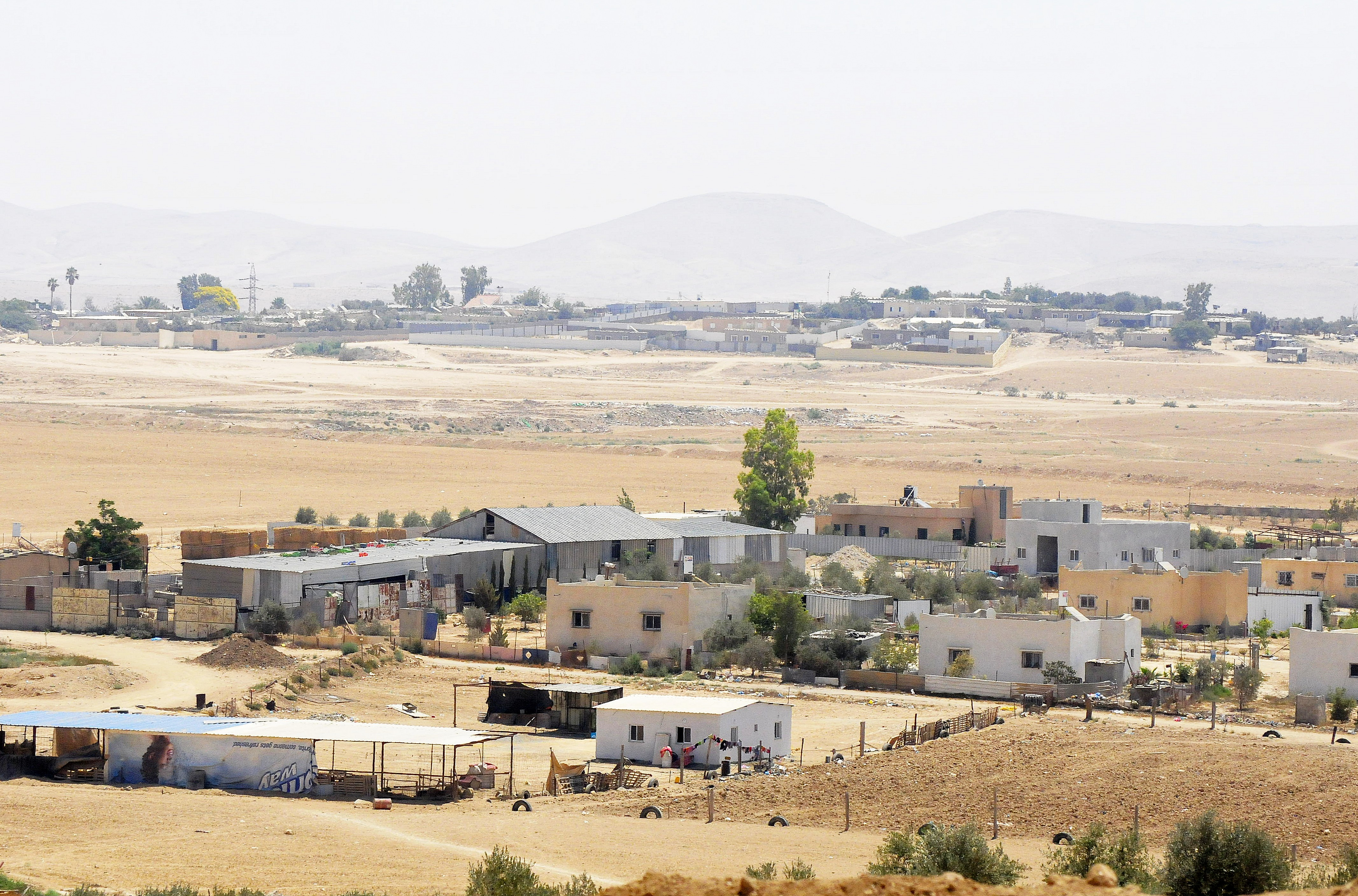
Houses in al-Sayyid

== See also ==
- Arab localities in Israel
- Bedouin in Israel
- Negev Bedouin
- Sedentarization
