= Drijat =

Village in southern Israel

Drijat: דריג'את (Hebrew); دريجات (Arabic)
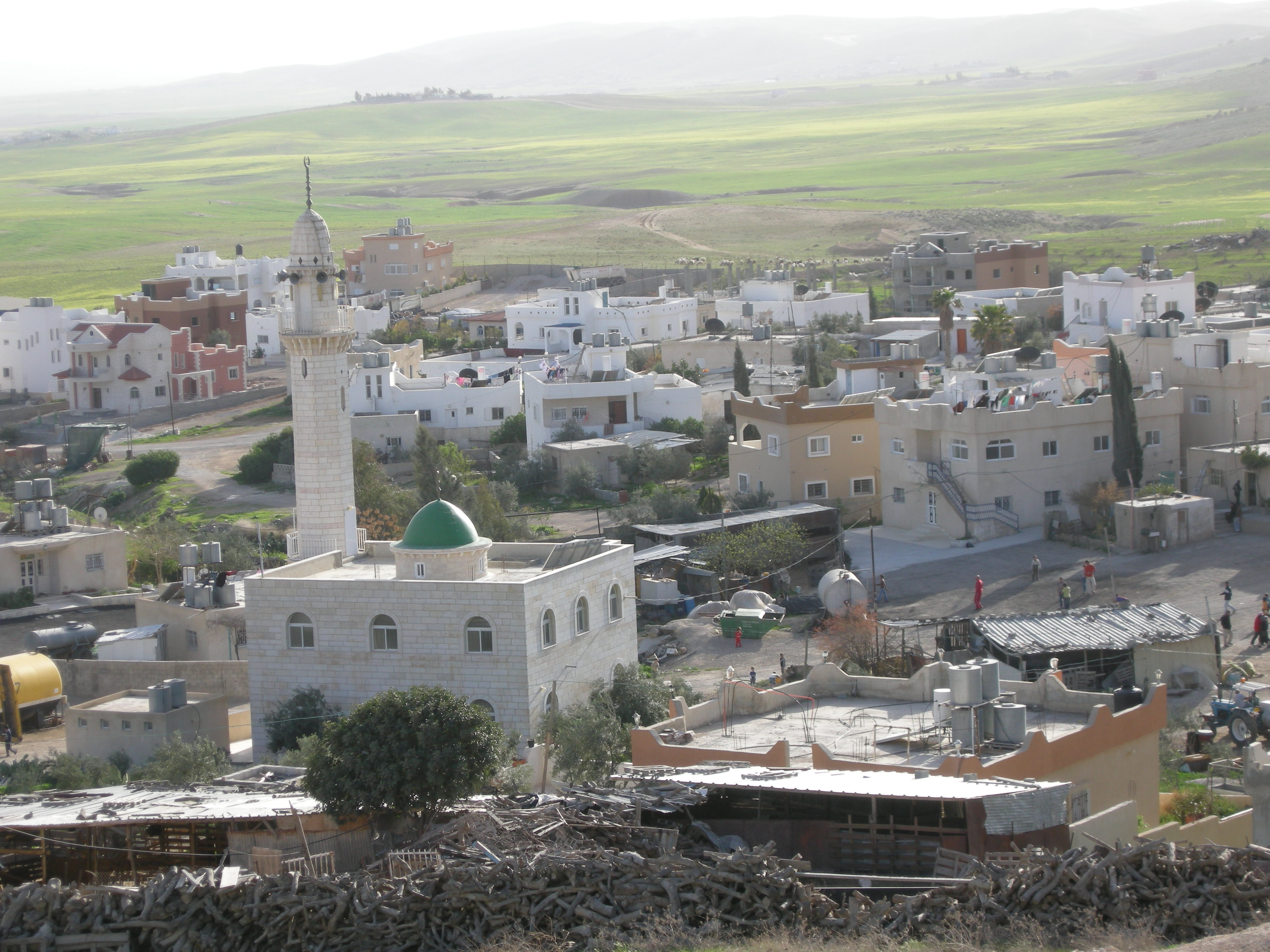

- Location within Northern Negev region of Israel Location within Israel
- Coordinates: 31°18′4″N 35°4′34″E
- Country: Israel
- District: Southern
- Subdistrict: Beersheba
- Council: Al-Kasom
- Population (2024): 581

Drijat (Arabic: دريجات; Hebrew: דריג'את), also known as Draijat, is an Arab village in southern Israel. Located in the Negev desert near Arad, between Kuseife and the Yatir Forest, it falls under the jurisdiction of al-Kasom Regional Council. In 2024 its population was 581.

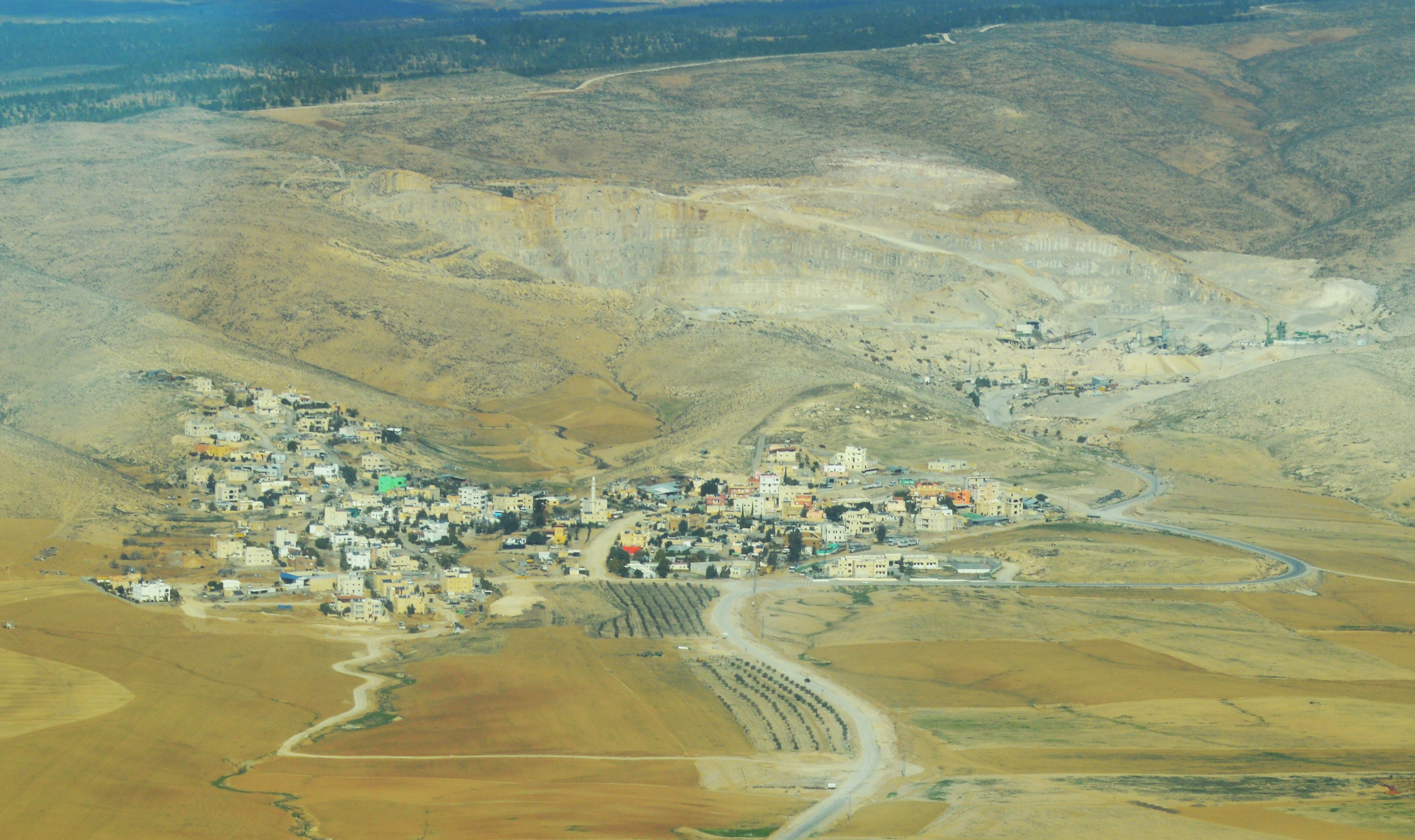
Aerial view of Drijat

== History ==
According to its residents, Drijat was established in the 19th century. However, like dozens of other Arab locales in the Negev Desert, was an unrecognized village until 2004, when it joined the Abu Basma Regional Council. It is the only Arab village in the Negev that is not Bedouin; its residents are descended from a long line of fellahin. The ruins of a historical site named Dargot is located in Drijat, which is on the Israel National Trail.

In 2009 the village was connected to national water carrier, but remains unconnected to the electricity grid. In 2005, it became the first town in the world to be outfitted with a multipurpose solar electricity system for providing power to the entire village and reducing pollution. The only solar-powered mosque in the Middle East is also located in the village.

== See also ==
- Arab localities in Israel
