= Al-Kasom Regional Council =

Regional council in southern Israel

Coordinates: 31°15′28″N 34°58′26″E

Al-Kasom Regional Council מועצה אזורית אל קסום المجلس الإقليمي القيصوم
- Regional council (from 2012)
- Interactive map of Al-Kasom Regional Council
- Country: Israel
- District: Southern
- Subdistrict: Beersheba
- Natural region: Be'er Sheva

Government
  - Head of Municipality: Jaber Abu Kaf

Area
  - Total: 38,720 dunams (38.72 km^{2}; 14.95 sq mi)

Population (2025)
  - Total: 21,049
  - Density: 543.6/km^{2} (1,408/sq mi)
- Website: abubasma.org.il

al-Kasom Regional Council (Hebrew: מועצה אזורית אל קסום, Mo'atza Azorit El Kassum, Arabic: المجلس الإقليمي القيصوم, al-Majlis al-Iqlīmī al-Qayṣūm) is one of two Negev Bedouin regional councils formed as a result of the split of the Abu Basma Regional Council on November 5, 2012. Al-Kasom regional council is in the northwestern Negev desert of Israel.

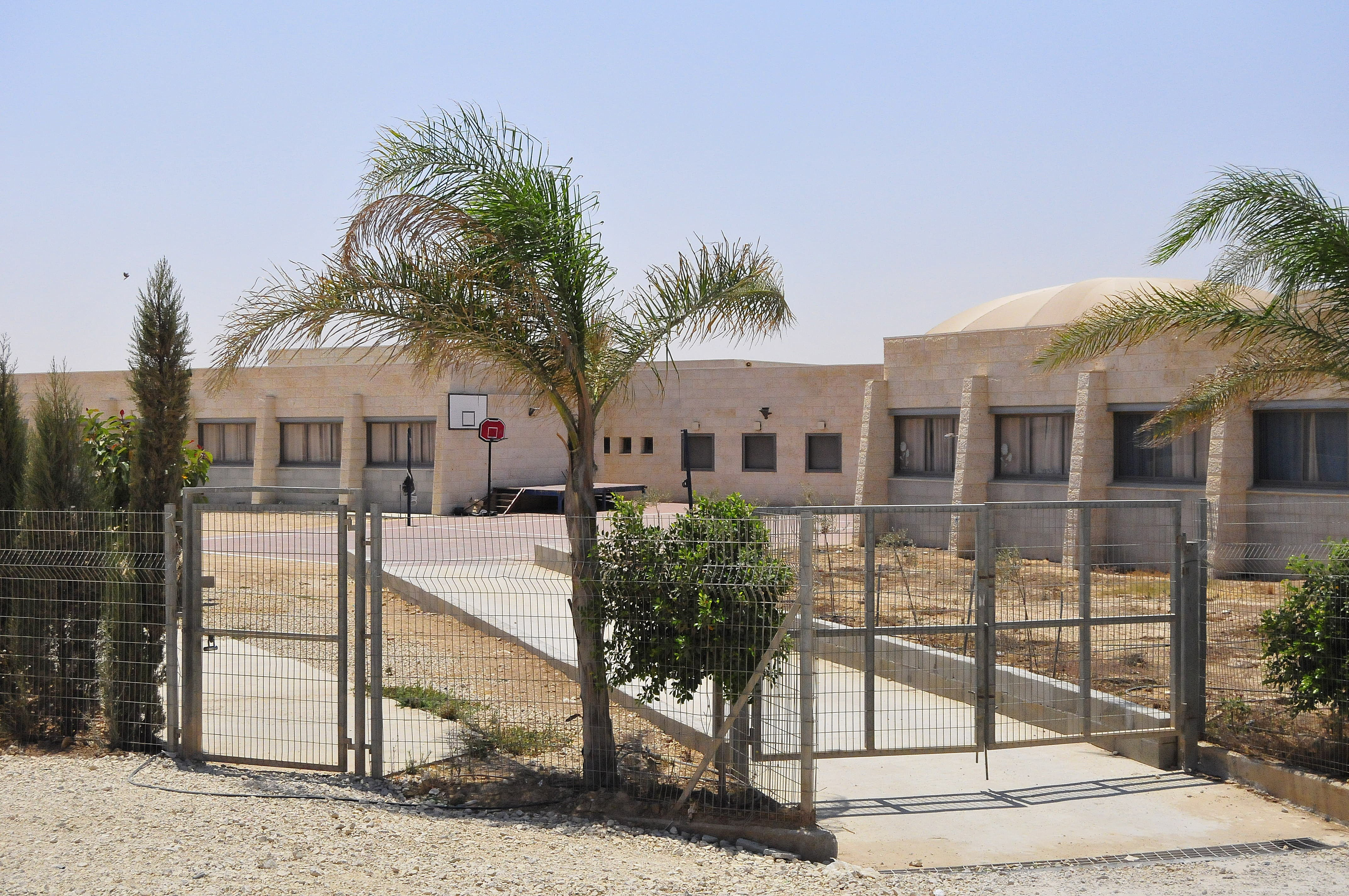
School in al-Sayyid, under jurisdiction of al-Kasom regional council

It is made up of seven recognized Arab communities: Tirabin al-Sana, Umm Batin, al-Sayyid, Mulada, Makhul, Kukhleh (Abu Rubaiya) and Drijat (Durayjat).

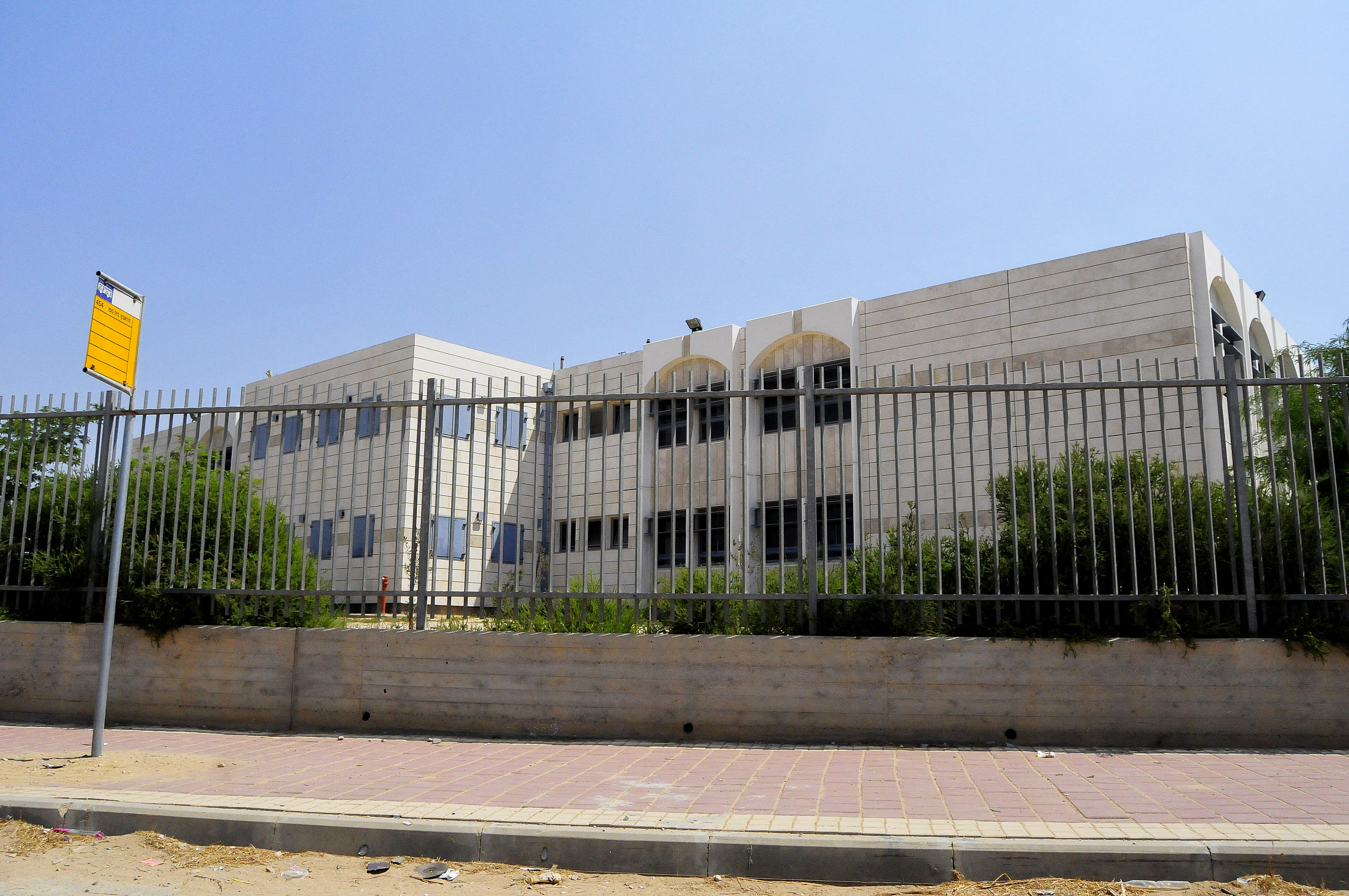
School in Tirabin al-Sana

The overall population is over 20,000 (as of June 2013). There are also Bedouin living in unrecognized villages whose exact number is unknown. The al-Kasom Regional Council, as well as Neve Midbar Regional Council are the main arena for the implementation of the Prawer Plan, which was shelved in 2013.

== History ==
=== Legal background ===
Prior to the establishment of Israel, the Negev Bedouins were a semi-nomadic pastoralist society undergoing a process of sedentariness since the Ottoman rule of the region. During the British Mandate period, the administration did not provide a legal framework to justify and preserve lands’ ownership. In order to settle this issue, Israel's land policy was adapted to a large extent from the Ottoman land regulations of 1858 as the only preceding legal frame. Thus Israel nationalized most of the Negev lands using the state's land regulations from 1969 and designated most of it for military and national security purposes.

=== Sedentarization ===
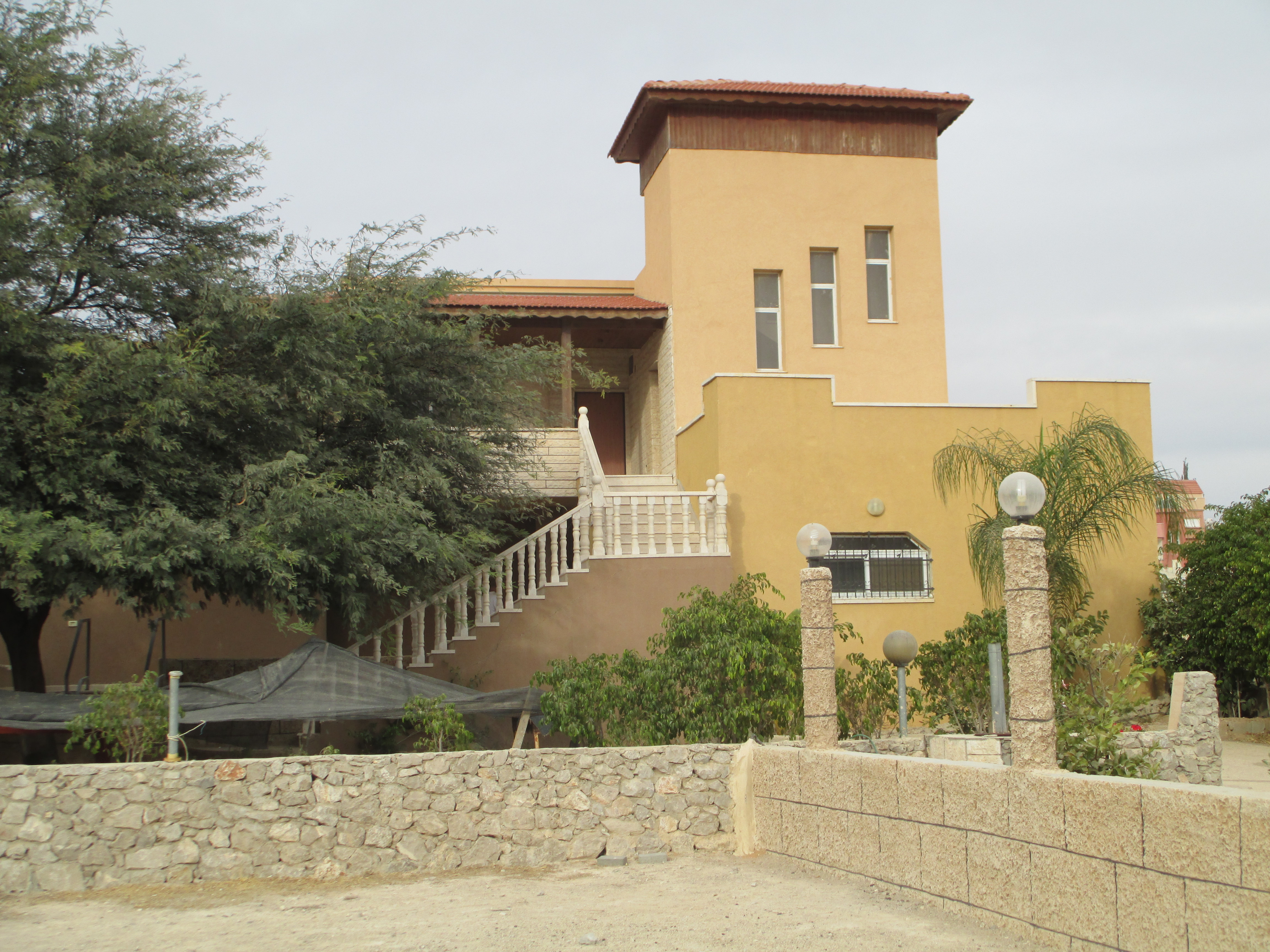
Home in Drijat

The 1948 UN Partition Plan, which was accepted by the Jewish leaders, envisaged most of the Negev (including most of the ancestral Negev Bedouin territory) as part of a planned Arab state, with the Jewish State of Israel situated to the north in areas with an existing Jewish majority. However, after the rejection of the UN plan by the united Arab nations, their subsequent declaration of war on Israel, and their eventual defeat in the 1948 Palestine war, the Negev became part of Israel and the Negev Bedouin became Israeli citizens.

The new Israeli government continued the policy of sedentarization of Negev Bedouins imposed by the Ottoman authorities in the early 20th century, mirroring developments in nearby Arab nations. Early stages of this process included regulation of previously open lands used for grazing and re-location of Bedouin tribes. In the decades after the war of independence, the Israeli government was concerned about the allegiance of the Negev Bedouin to the new State, and thus re-located two-thirds of the southern Bedouin population into a closed area under the authority of the IDF. This situation was maintained until the late 1970s.

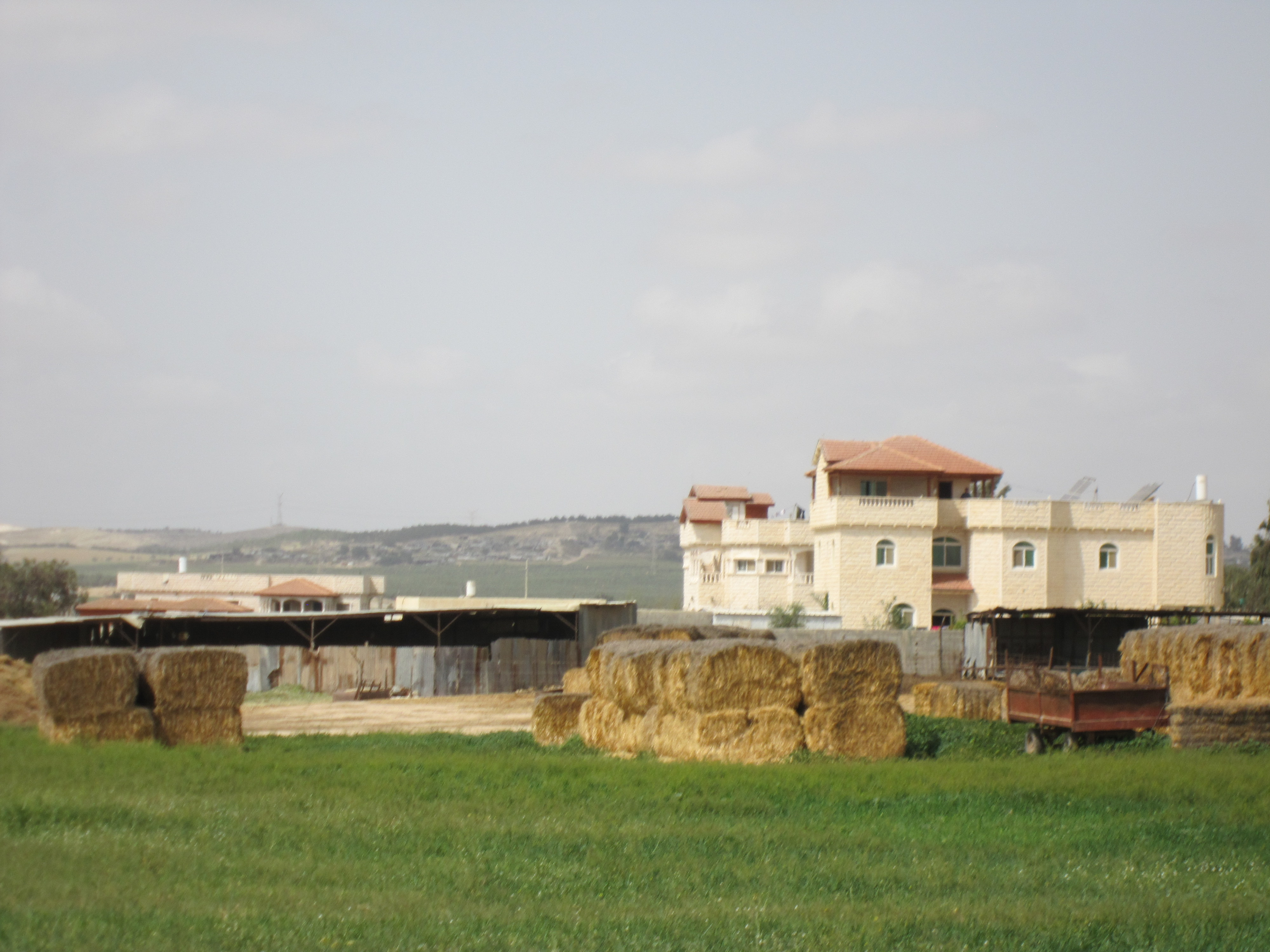
Private residence and farm in Umm Batin

Starting in the 1980s the civilian government took back control of the northern Negev Bedouin from the IDF and began to establish purpose-built townships specifically for Bedouins in order to sedentarize and urbanize them, and to allow for the provision of government services. The government promoted these towns as offering better living conditions, proper infrastructure and access to public services in health, education, and sanitation. The new development towns constructed by the state in the 1980s absorbed a large proportion of the Negev Bedouin population but were unable to handle the entire Bedouin population, and their later reputation for crime and poor economy, together with a cultural preference for rural life, caused many Israeli Bedouin to shun these towns in favour of rural villages unapproved by the State.

Today, the government estimates that about 60% of Bedouin citizens of Israel live in permanently planned towns, while the rest live in unrecognised villages spread throughout the Negev. These villages are considered illegal under Israeli law, and their legal status, coupled with their periodic demolition and evacuation by police, is the subject of considerable debate.

=== Abu Basma regional council ===
In 2003, the government decided to establish a new regional council, known as the Abu Basma Regional Council, in order to oversee the resettlement and development of Bedouin communities in the area around Be'er Sheva, Dimona, and Arad. This was coupled by the formal recognition of a number of existing Bedouin villages within the council in order to encourage Bedouin to move from other unrecognised/illegal villages elsewhere in the Negev.

The council was established by the Israeli Ministry of Interior on 28 January 2004. At the time, the regional council had a population of approximately 30,000 Bedouins and a total land area of 34,000 dunams, making it the most populous regional council in the Southern District but the smallest in jurisdiction. There was considerable controversy within the Bedouin community regarding the establishment of this council. The Regional Council of Unrecognized Villages (RCUV) argued that while the creation of the Abu Basma Regional Council would set a precedent for the transformation of unrecognized villages into urban ghettos by limiting their boundaries to the area of habitation and zoning most Bedouin grazing grounds; this type of de jure recognition has not entailed the introduction of business districts or de facto recognition through equitable provision of education, health, transportation and municipal waste services long denied to, and demanded, by the Bedouin community.

=== Prawer plan ===
In September 2011, the Israeli government approved a five-year economic development plan called the Prawer plan. One of its implications is a relocation of some 30.000-40.000 Negev Bedouin from areas not recognized by the government to government-approved townships.

The plan is based on a proposal developed by a team headed by Ehud Prawer, head of policy planning in the Prime Minister's Office (PMO). This proposal was based on the recommendations of the committee chaired by retired Supreme Court Justice Eliezer Goldberg. Maj.-Gen. (ret.) Doron Almog was appointed as the head of the staff to implement the plan to provide status for the Bedouin communities in the Negev. Minister Benny Begin was appointed by the cabinet to coordinate public and Bedouin population comments on the issue.

The Prawer plan was part of an effort to develop the Negev and bring about better integration of the Bedouin in Israeli society, significantly reducing economic and social gaps. A vast investment of NIS 1.2 billion was approved by the government to promote employment among Bedouin women and youth. Funds were allocated to the development of industrial zones, such as Idan HaNegev, establishment of employment centers and professional training.

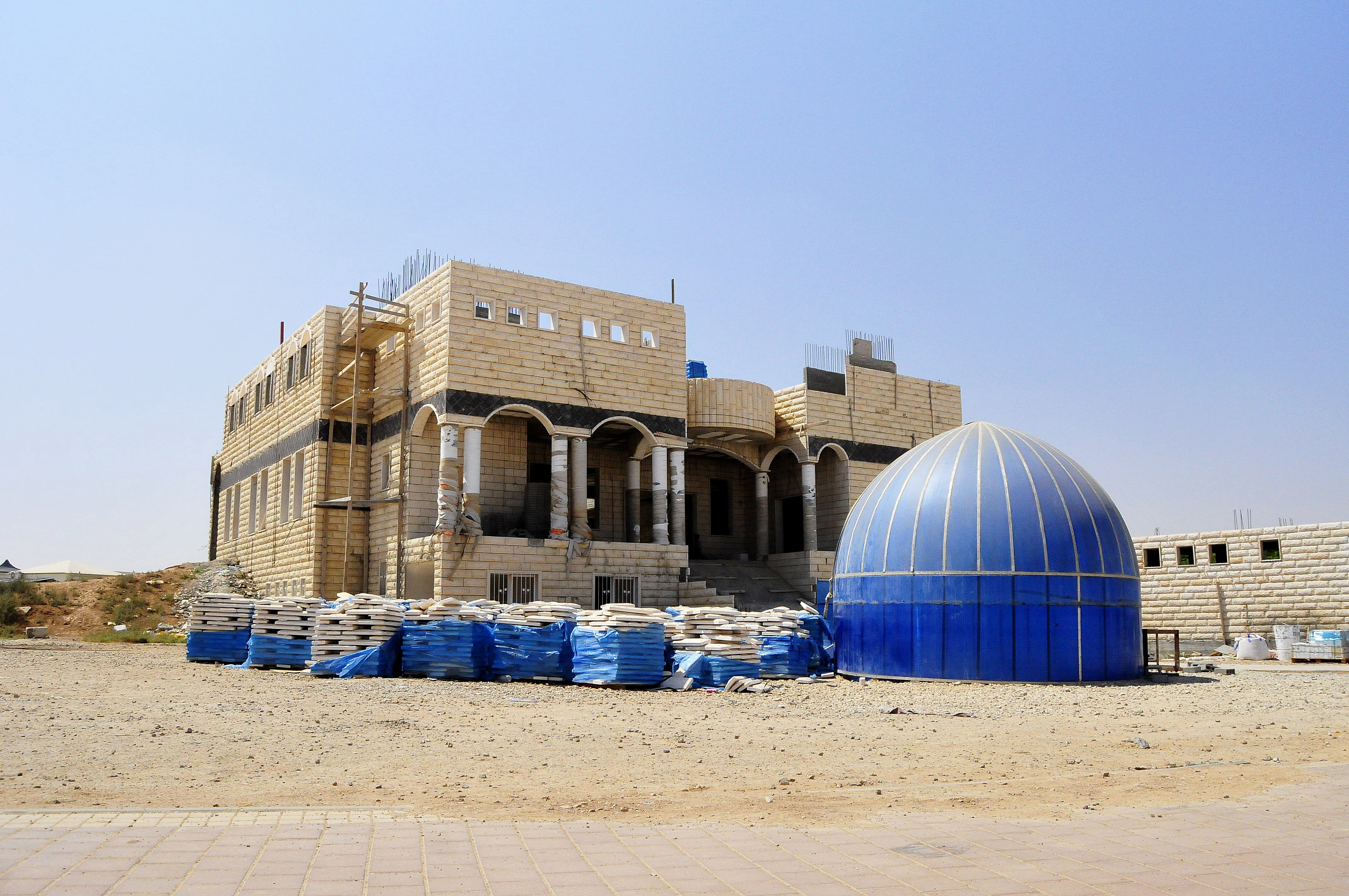
Tirabin al-Sana mosque under construction, using dome from mosque in old Tarabin encampment near Omer

As a part of this plan some previously unrecognized Bedouin communities in the Negev would be officially recognized and receive all basic infrastructure: electricity, water, sewage, education and medical services. One of the main principles of this plan was close cooperation with the local Bedouin communities.

The Prawer plan is meant to find a solution to numerous land claims filed by the Negev Bedouin. They claim the ownership of land totaling some 600,000 dunams (60,000 hectares or 230 square miles) - it is 12 times the size of Tel Aviv. But the Prawer plan has drawn criticism. Critics say it will turn Bedouin dispossession into law and come to a conclusion that relocation of the Bedouin will be compelled. Some even speak about ethnic cleansing. As a result, these remarks provoked heavy criticism of the plan by the European Parliament.

After a number of complicated discreet agreements with the state all of the Bedouin of Tarabin clan moved into a township built for them with all the amenities - Tirabin al-Sana. Following negotiations, the Bedouin of al-'Azazme clan will take part in the planning of a new quarter that will be erected for them to the west of Segev Shalom, cooperating with The Authority for the Regulation of Bedouin Settlement in the Negev.

== Voting Patterns ==
In the 2022 election, 88 percent of voters in the regional council voted for the Arab parties, while 8 percent voted for the parties of the right-wing coalition led by Benjamin Netanyahu and 4 percent voted for the parties of the center-left coalition led by Yair Lapid.

In the 2026 election, 97 percent of voters in the regional council voted for the Arab parties (mostly Ra'am), while 1.3 percent voted for the parties of the center-left coalition led by Gadi Eisenkot and 0.6 percent voted for the parties of the right-wing coalition led by Benjamin Netanyahu. Voter turnout roughly doubled compared to the 2022 election.

== See also ==
- Arab localities in Israel
