= Tirabin al-Sana =

Bedouin village in southern Israel

Tirabin al-Sana: תראבין א-צאנע (Hebrew); ترابين (Arabic)
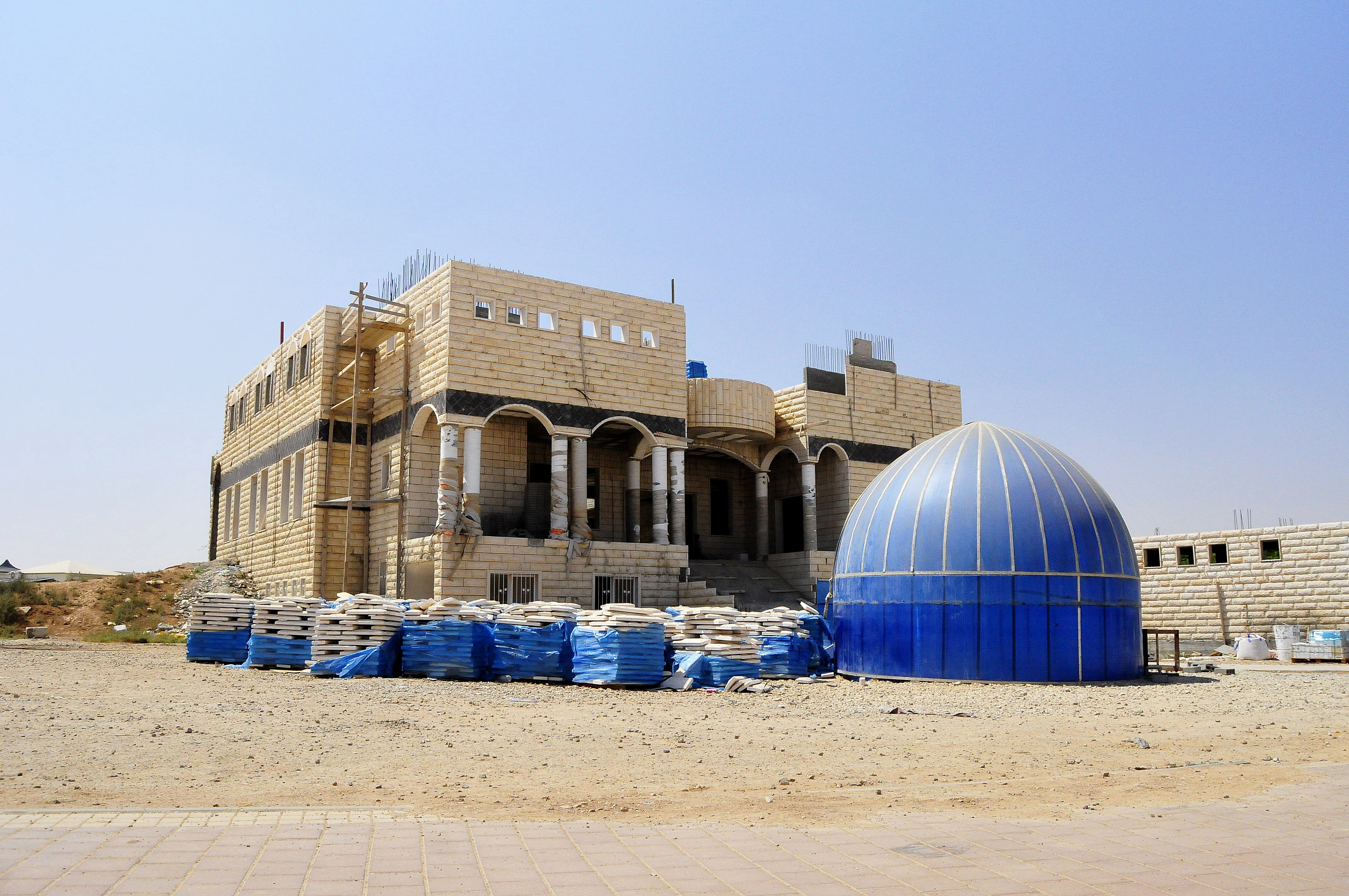
- Tirabin al-Sana's mosque under construction

- Location within Northwest Negev region of Israel Location within Israel
- Coordinates: 31°20′44″N 34°44′13″E
- Country: Israel
- District: Southern
- Subdistrict: Beersheba
- Council: Al-Kasom
- Founded: 2005
- Population (2024): 1,124

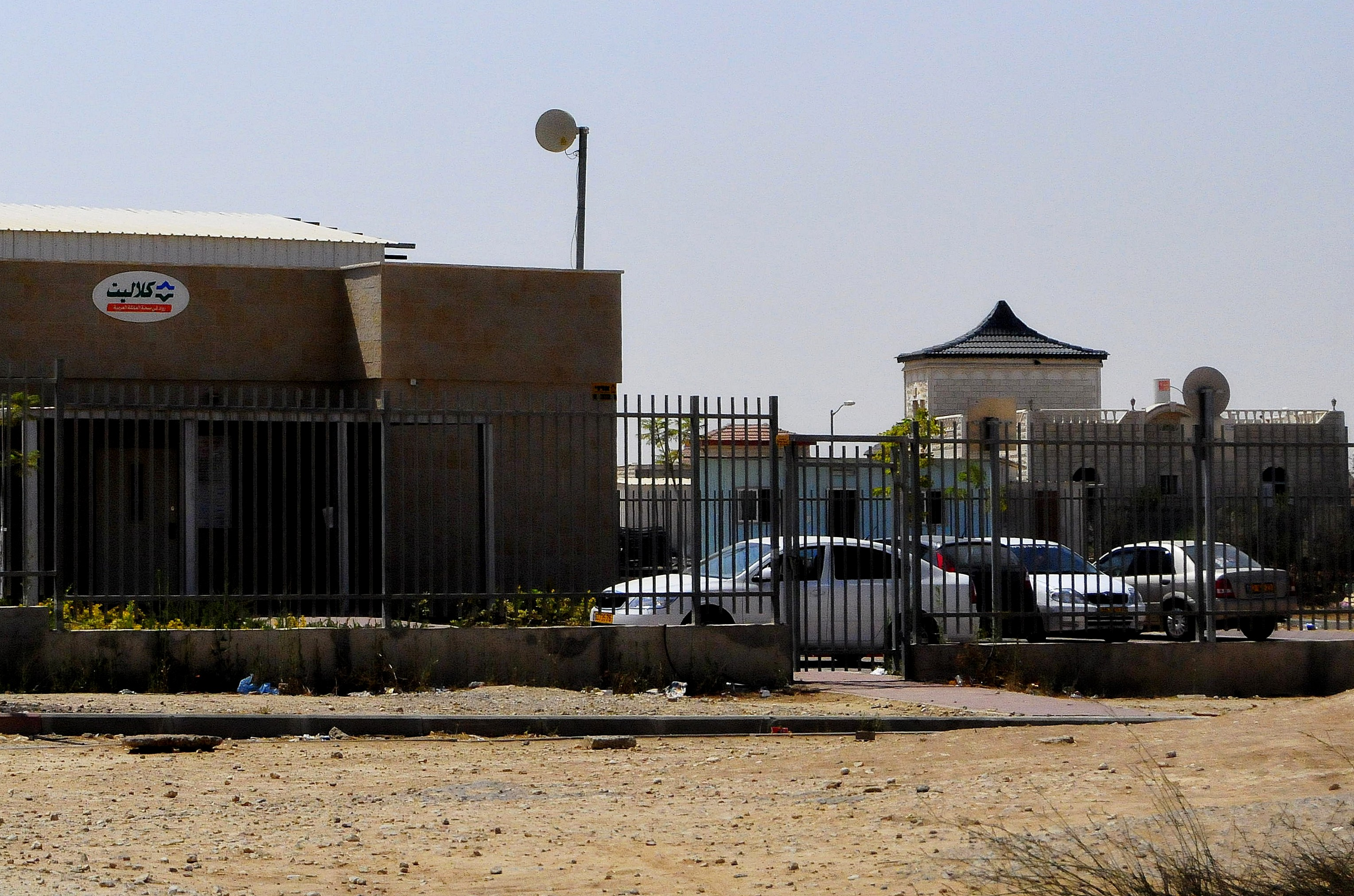
A local medical clinic

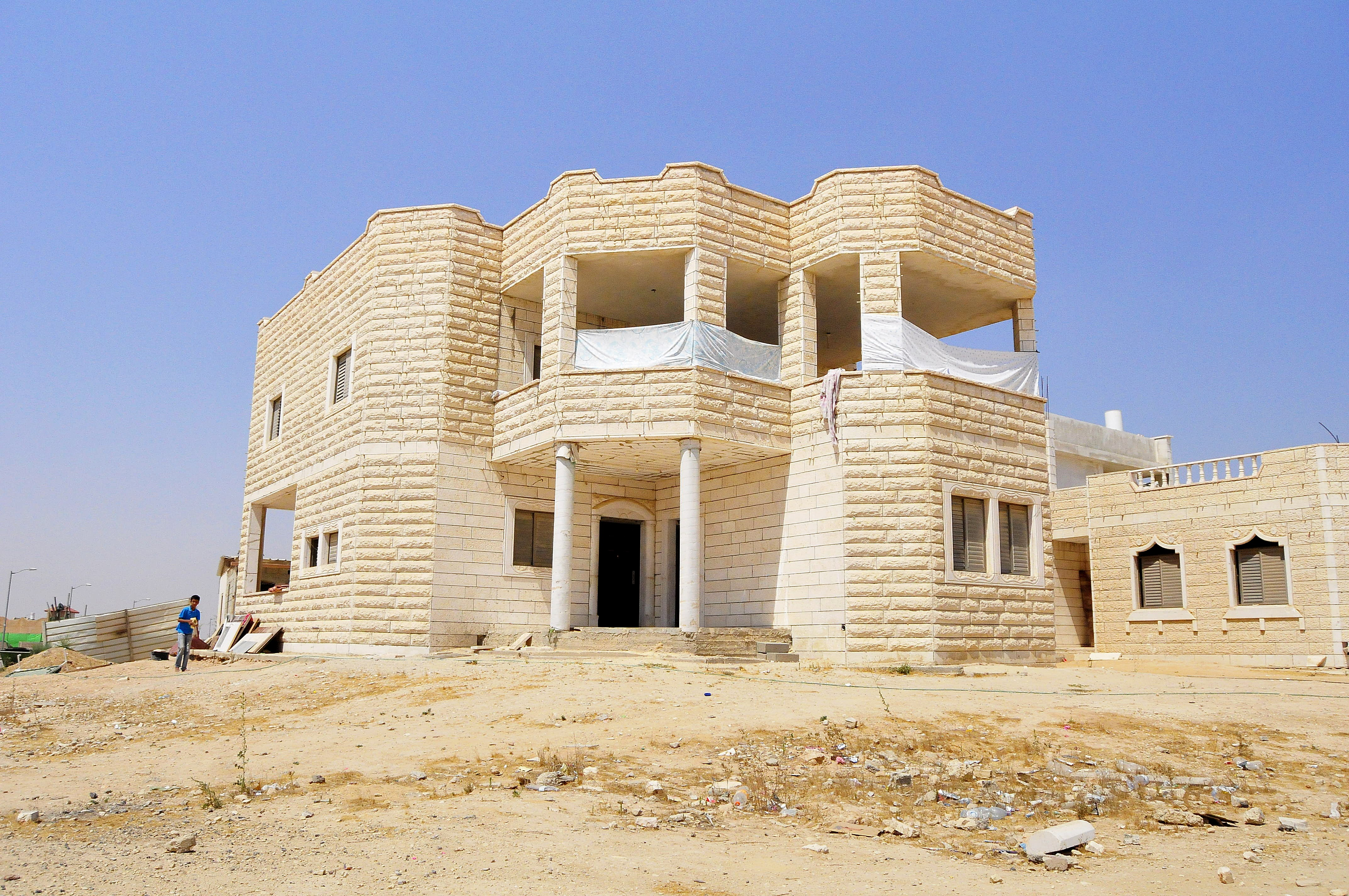
A private house being built in Tirabin al-Sana (July 2012)

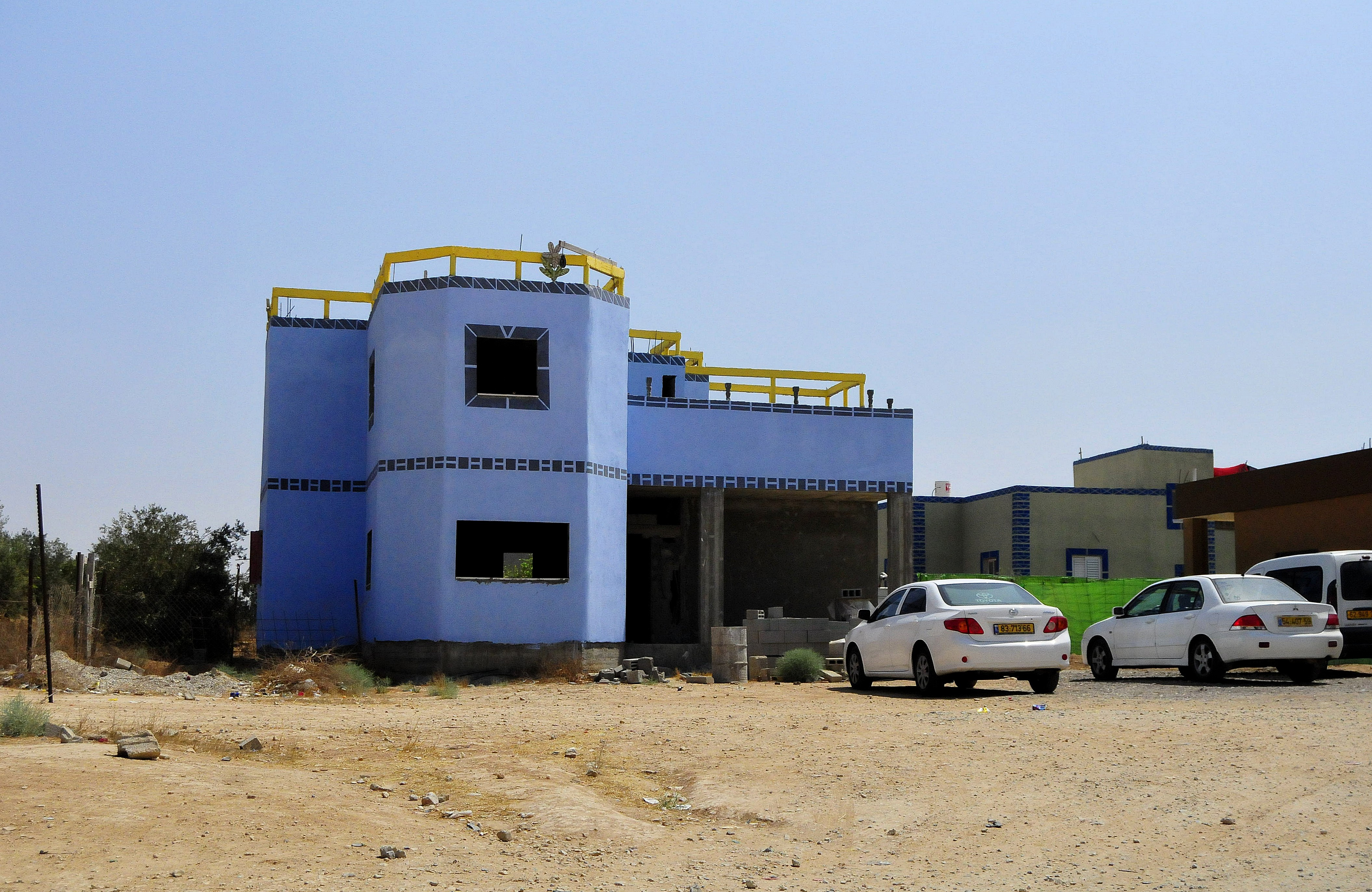
Private residence in Tirabin al-Sana. July 2012

Tirabin al-Sana (Hebrew: תראבין א-צאנע), also Tarabin (Arabic: ترابين), is a Bedouin village in the Negev desert in southern Israel. The village was built for the Tarabin tribe. Located near Rahat and Mishmar HaNegev, it falls under the jurisdiction of al-Kasom Regional Council. In 2024 it had a population of 1,124.

== History ==
Prior to the establishment of Israel, the Negev Bedouins were a semi-nomadic society that had been through a process of sedentariness since the Ottoman rule of the region. During the British Mandate period, no legal framework was established to justify and preserve land ownership. Thus Israel's land policy was adopted to a large extent from the Ottoman land regulations of 1858 as the only legal precedent.

Israel has continued the Ottoman policy of sedentarization of Negev Bedouins. In the 1950s the government re-settled two-thirds of the Negev Bedouin in an area that was under a martial law. Several townships were built for them, offering better living conditions, infrastructure, sanitation, health and education, and municipal services.

As of today, according to the information of Israel Land Administration, over 60% of the Negev Bedouin live in seven settlements in the Negev desert with approved plans and developed infrastructure: Hura, Lakiya, Ar'arat an-Naqab (Ar'ara BaNegev), Shaqib al-Salam (Segev Shalom), Tel as-Sabi (Tel-Sheva), Kuseife and the city of Rahat, the largest among them). These townships cannot resolve the issue of high population density and illegal construction in the Negev absolutely, so besides expanding existing towns, the Israeli government has decided to construct 13 additional settlements for the Negev Bedouin, and Tirabin al-Sana is one of them.

Government Resolution 881 on 29 September 2003 created eight new Bedouin settlements (seven of which were to be located in the now defunct Abu Basma Regional Council). The village was later established in 2005. At first the Bedouin were reluctant to relocate there, only a part of the tribe settled in it. But at the end of 2011 as a result of fruitful negotiations, the rest of the Tarabin tribe living in an unrecognized village nearby moved into the newly built locality with empty land plots waiting for them.

== Demographics ==
The rate of unemployment and crime remains high in Bedouin townships. School through age 16 is mandatory by law, but many do not complete their matriculation examinations. Women suffer discrimination due to patriarchal nature of Bedouin society. Another serious problem is trespassing on state lands and building unrecognized settlements having no municipal status and facing demolition orders.

== Economy ==
There is an industrial park in the suburbs of Rahat, several more industrial parks are situated in the area—Beersheba and Hura. Currently a new industrial park is being built close to Rahat, it is called Idan HaNegev. Village residents also work in the services industry in Beersheba. There are several organizations that promote entrepreneurship among the 160,000 Bedouins living in the Negev, primarily aimed at Bedouin women.

== Urban development ==
Tirabin al-Sana has all the basic public services, including medical services, schooling, post office, etc. For higher quality services village residents can turn to Beersheba, where Soroka Medical Center is situated.

There is an operating public sewage collection system for residential buildings and public institutions that some other localities in the area lack.

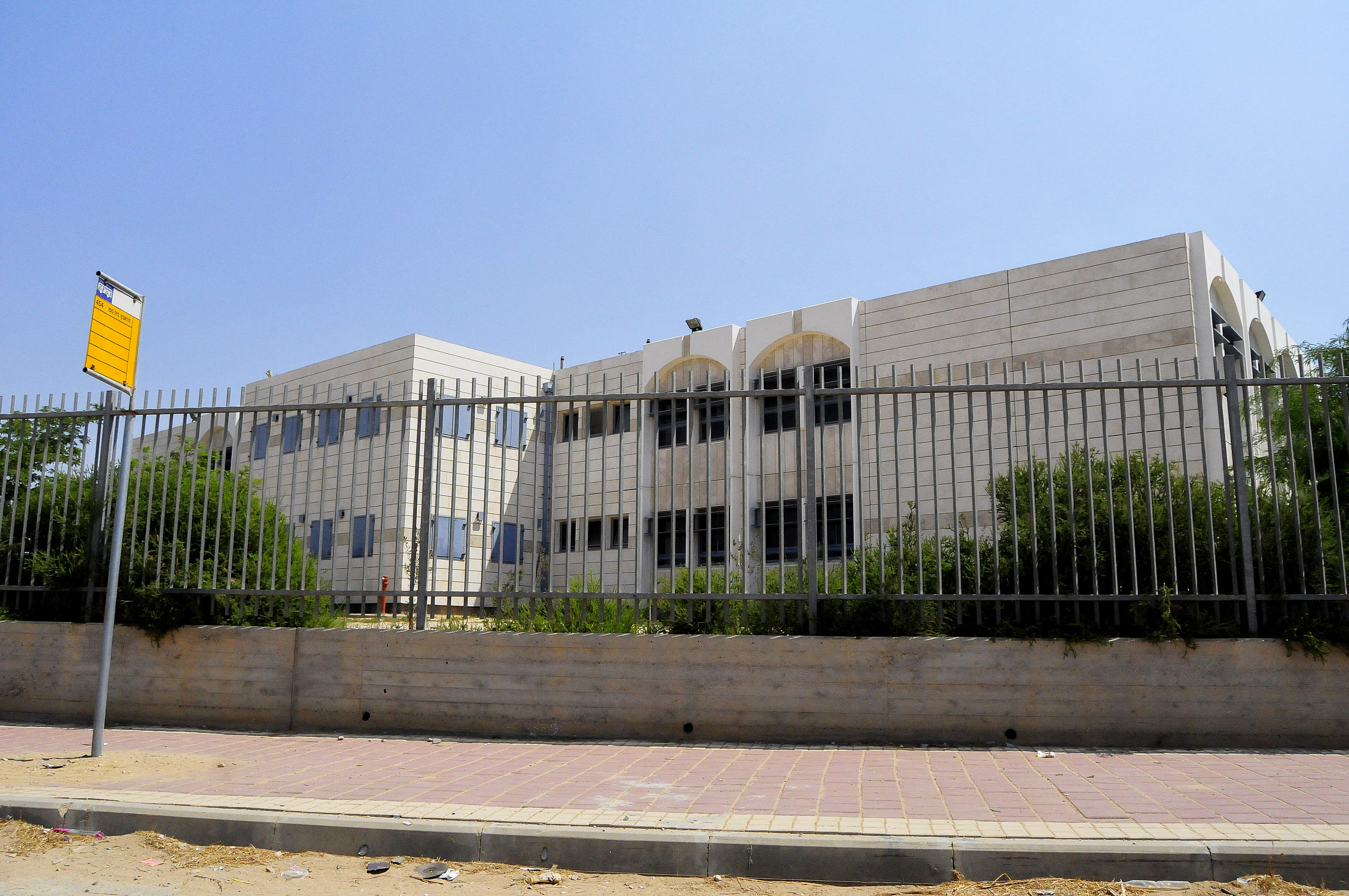
One of Tarabin's school

== Education ==
There are several schools in the village. Nearby higher education options include Ben-Gurion University of the Negev and Sapir Academic College in Sderot. Soon, with the support of Harvard University, a new campus will be erected in Rahat, in the new Idan HaNegev industrial zone. Ben-Gurion University of the Negev will oversee the new campus's operations, and it will be considered a branch of BGU.

== Solar energy ==
In 2011 an Israeli solar energy company Arava Power signed a contract with the Tarabin tribe in the Negev Desert to build a solar installation. The company is negotiating with the government a 30% of Israel's guaranteed solar power feed-in tariff caps set apart just for the Bedouin people. A plan for a photovoltaic solar installation was approved by Ministry of Interior's Southern Regional Planning and Building Committee in September 2011.

== Notable people ==
- Ouda Tarabin

== See also ==
- Arab localities in Israel
