= Umm Batin =

Bedouin village in the northern Negev, Southern Israel

Umm Batin: אום בטין (Hebrew); أم بطين (Arabic)
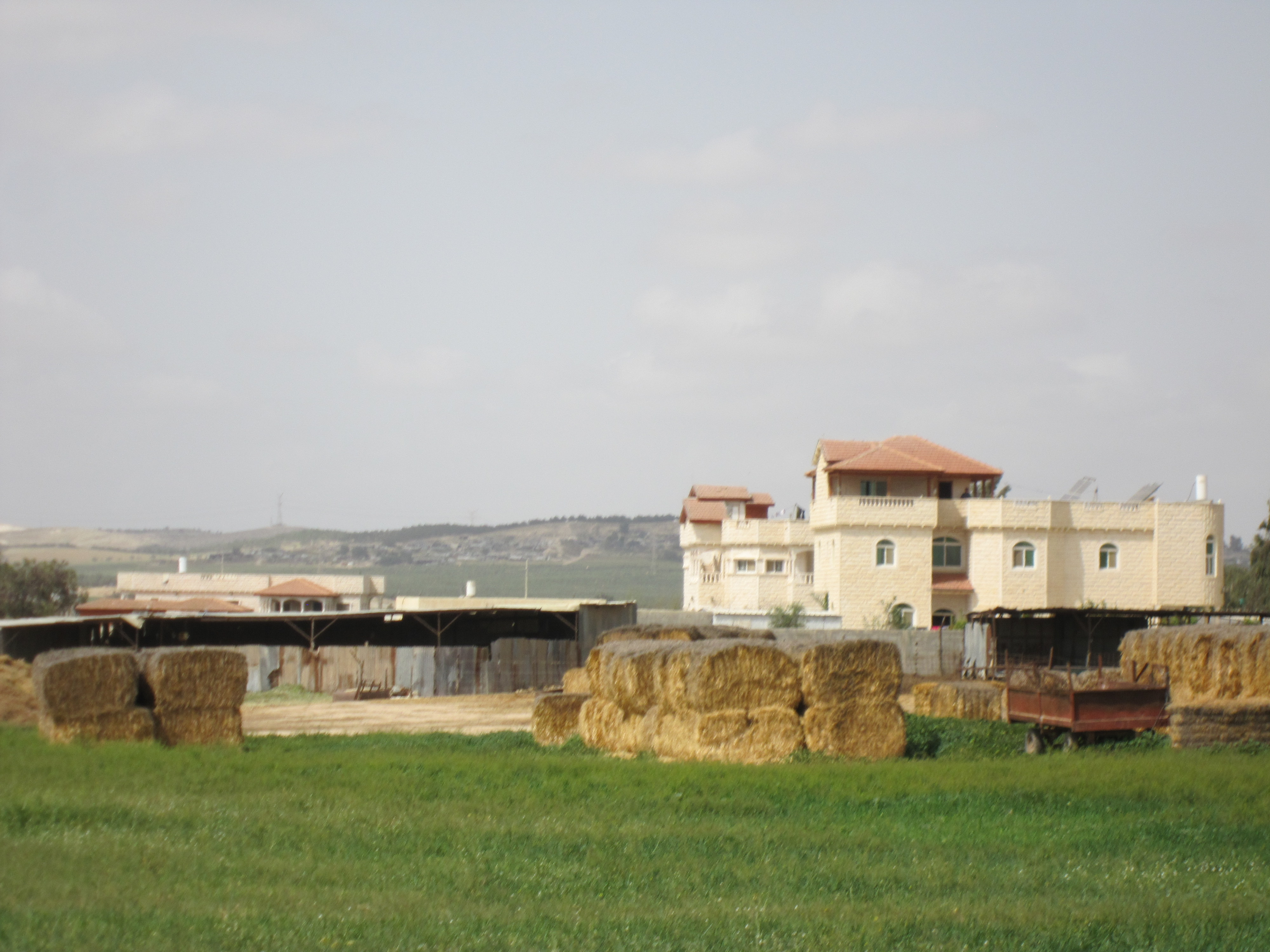
- Etymology: Hidden Mother
- Location within Northern Negev region of Israel Location within Israel
- Coordinates: 31°16′30″N 34°52′59″E
- Country: Israel
- District: Southern
- Subdistrict: Beersheba
- Council: Al-Kasom
- Founded: 2004
- Area: 6,000 dunams (6.0 km^{2}; 2.3 sq mi)
- Population (2024): 5,572
  - Density: 930/km^{2} (2,400/sq mi)

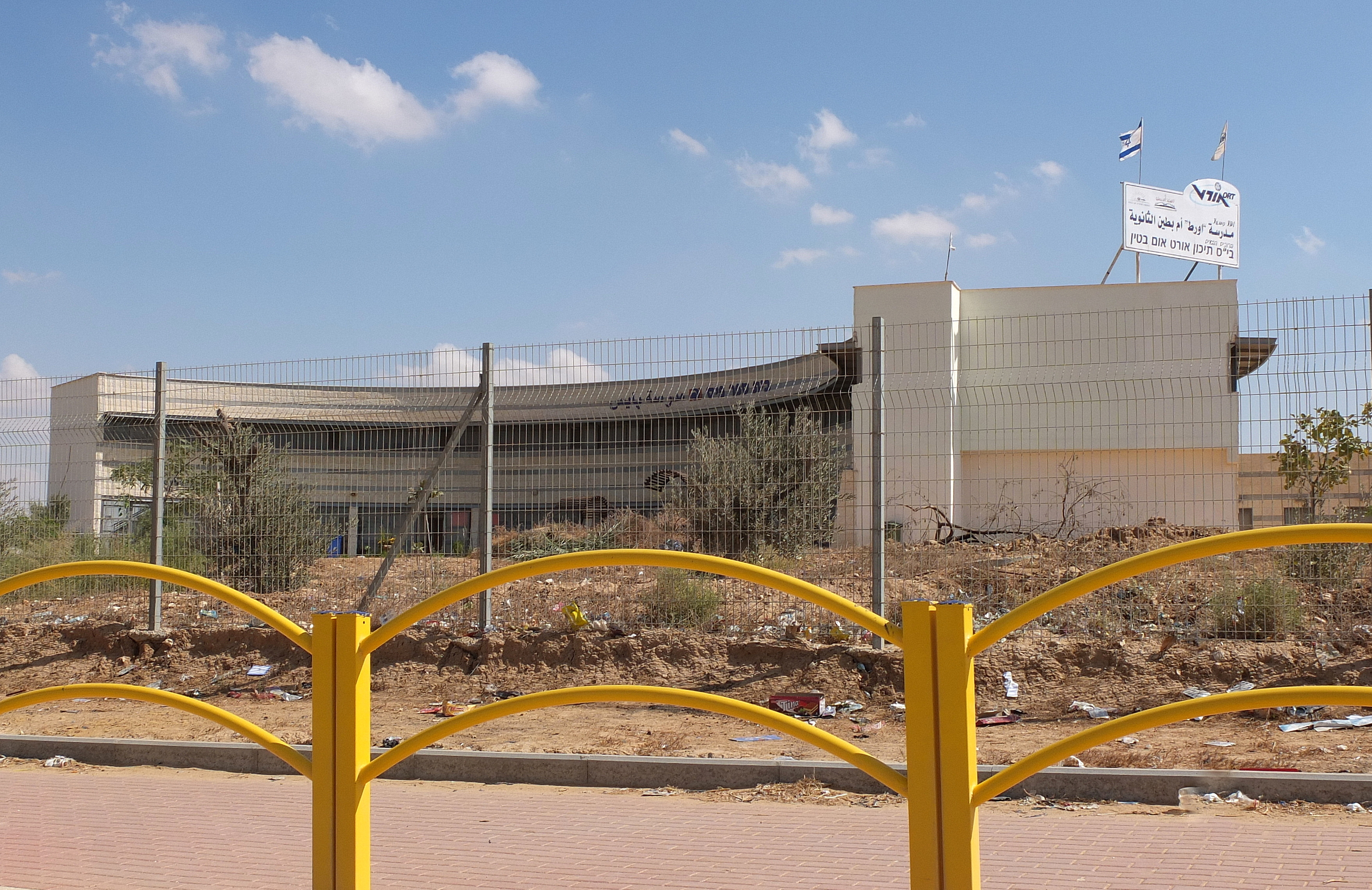
ORT Umm Batin High School

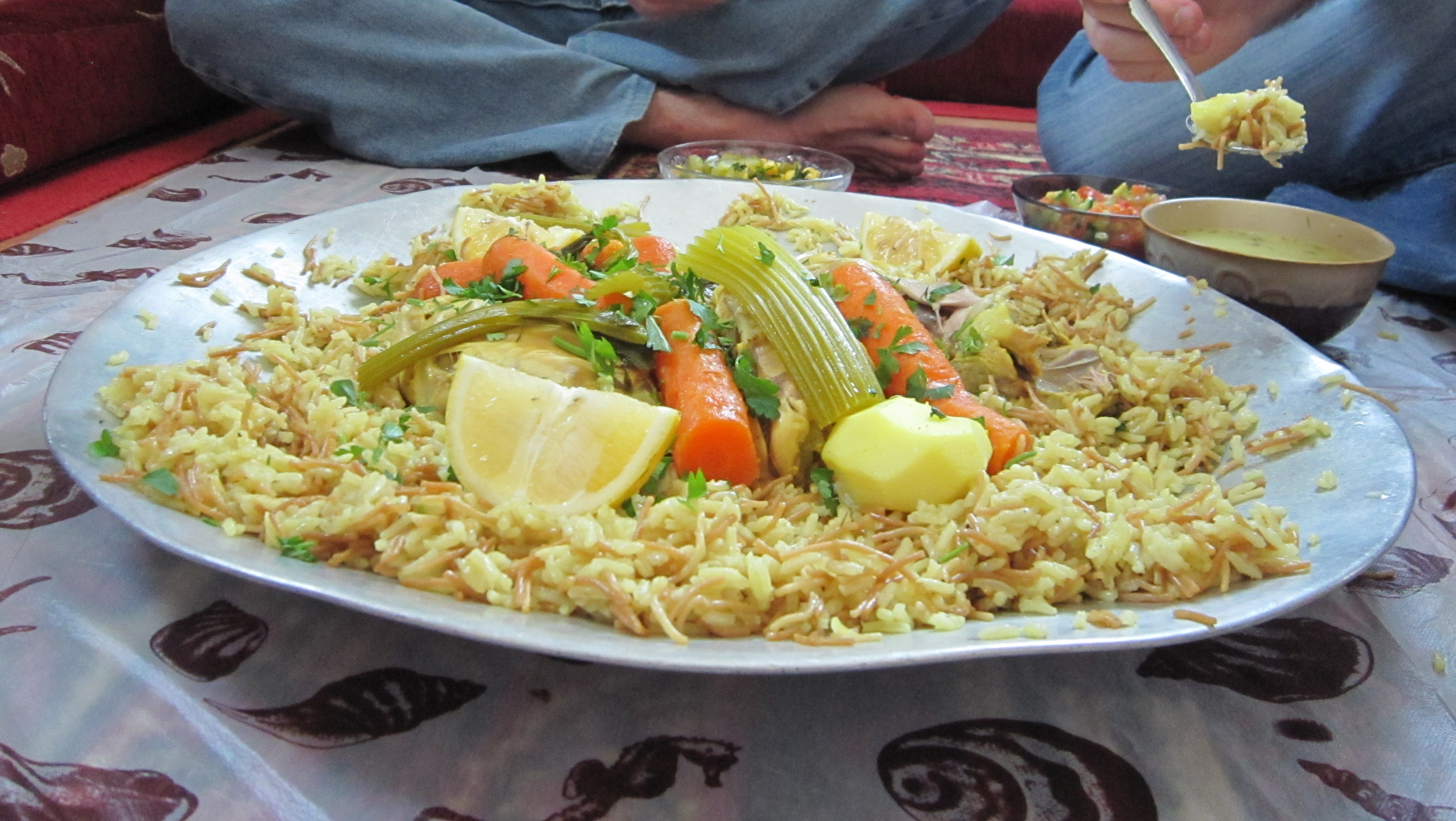
Traditional Bedouin dish

Umm Batin (Arabic: أم بطين; Hebrew: אום בטין) is a Bedouin village in southern Israel. Located in the northern Negev desert, 12 km northeast of Beersheba and adjacent to the highway 60, it falls under the jurisdiction of al-Kasom Regional Council. In 2024 it had a population of 5,572.

== Etymology ==
The village name derives from the Arabic words for mother, umm (أمّ), and hidden, batin (باتين). Translated, Umm Batin can mean either Hidden Mother or Mother of the Hidden. The historical origins of the village name are not well-documented.

== History ==
Prior to the establishment of Israel, the Negev Bedouins were a semi-nomadic society that had been through a process of sedentariness since the Ottoman rule of the region. During the British Mandate period, no legal framework was established to justify and preserve land ownership. Thus Israel’s land policy was adopted to a large extent from the Ottoman land regulations of 1858 as the only legal precedent.

Israel has continued the Ottoman policy of sedentarization of Negev Bedouins. In the 1950s Israel re-settled two-thirds of the Negev Bedouin in an area that was under a martial law. Several townships were built for them, offering better living conditions, infrastructure, sanitation, health and education, and municipal services.

As of today, according to the information of Israel Land Administration, over 60% of the Negev Bedouin live in seven settlements in the Negev desert with approved plans and developed infrastructure: Hura, Lakiya, Ar'arat an-Naqab (Ar'ara BaNegev), Shaqib al-Salam (Segev Shalom), Tel as-Sabi (Tel-Sheva), Kuseife and the city of Rahat, the largest among them. These townships cannot resolve the issue of high population density and illegal construction in the Negev absolutely, so besides expanding existing towns, the Israeli government has decided to construct 13 additional settlements with modern infrastructure for the Negev Bedouin, and Umm Batin is one of them.

The village was established following Government Resolution 881 on 29 September 2003, which created eight new Bedouin settlements (seven of which were to be located in the now defunct Abu Basma Regional Council). It was officially recognized in 2004.

In early December 2016, Israel’s Transport Ministry without any previous warning or explanation suddenly removed the village’s only bus stop, thus isolating villagers who do not have private vehicles.

== Local government ==
Formerly part of the Abu Basma Regional Council, Umm Batin currently falls under the jurisdiction of al-Kasom Regional Council. On November 5, 2012 the Israeli Ministry of Interior abolished Abu Basma, splitting it into two smaller regional councils, al-Kasom and Neve Midbar.

Prior to its division, Abu Basma Regional Council represented approximately 30,000 people spread across eleven newly recognized Bedouin villages. Along with the dismantling of Abu Basma, the Israeli Interior Minister postponed regional council elections for Al-Kasom and Neve Midbar until 2017. From its inception in 2003 until its division in 2012, Abu Basma Regional Council had been headed by an official appointed by the Interior Minister. The elections—which had been mandated in a ruling by the Israel Supreme Court to take place in December 2012 - would have represented the first democratically elected leadership of the Council.

It is accepted to give all the newly established councils a four-year trial period before elections are held. According to the amendment to the Regional Councils’ Law passed in 2009, that period can be extended by the Israeli Ministry of Interior indefinitely. Following a decision taken by the Knesset's Interior Committee in 2010 to force the government to present a detailed timeline for the council’s development the date for the first elections in the Abu Basma Regional Council was set as 2012. But due to the unpreparedness and low level of municipal services eventually these elections were delayed once again and never took place due to the regional council's abolition.

== Demography ==
The residents are mainly of two tribes: Abu Kaf and Abu Assa.

== Education ==
Umm Batin has four schools, serving kindergarten through twelfth grade: Abu Kaf and Al-Sanabel Elementary Schools, Awrat Secondary School, and ORT Umm Batin High School. There were a total of 2,163 students enrolled in Umm Batin schools in 2012. The nearest university is Ben-Gurion University of the Negev in Be'er Sheva.

There is an acting "The English in Umm Batin" program, a result of cooperation between the Ben-Gurion University of the Negev Medical School for International Health, the community of Umm Batin, and the students of ORT Umm Batin High School.

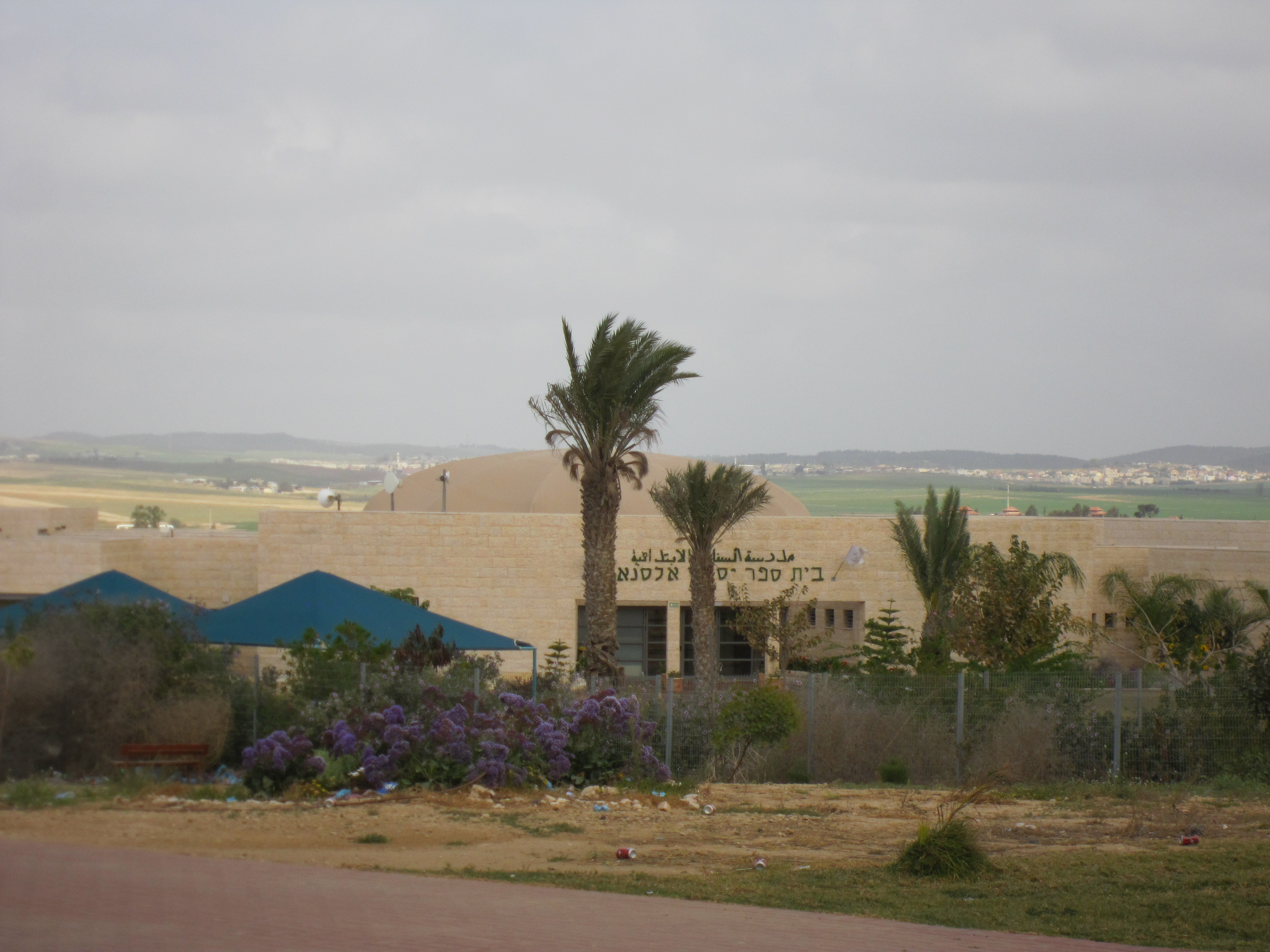
Al-Sanabel Elementary School

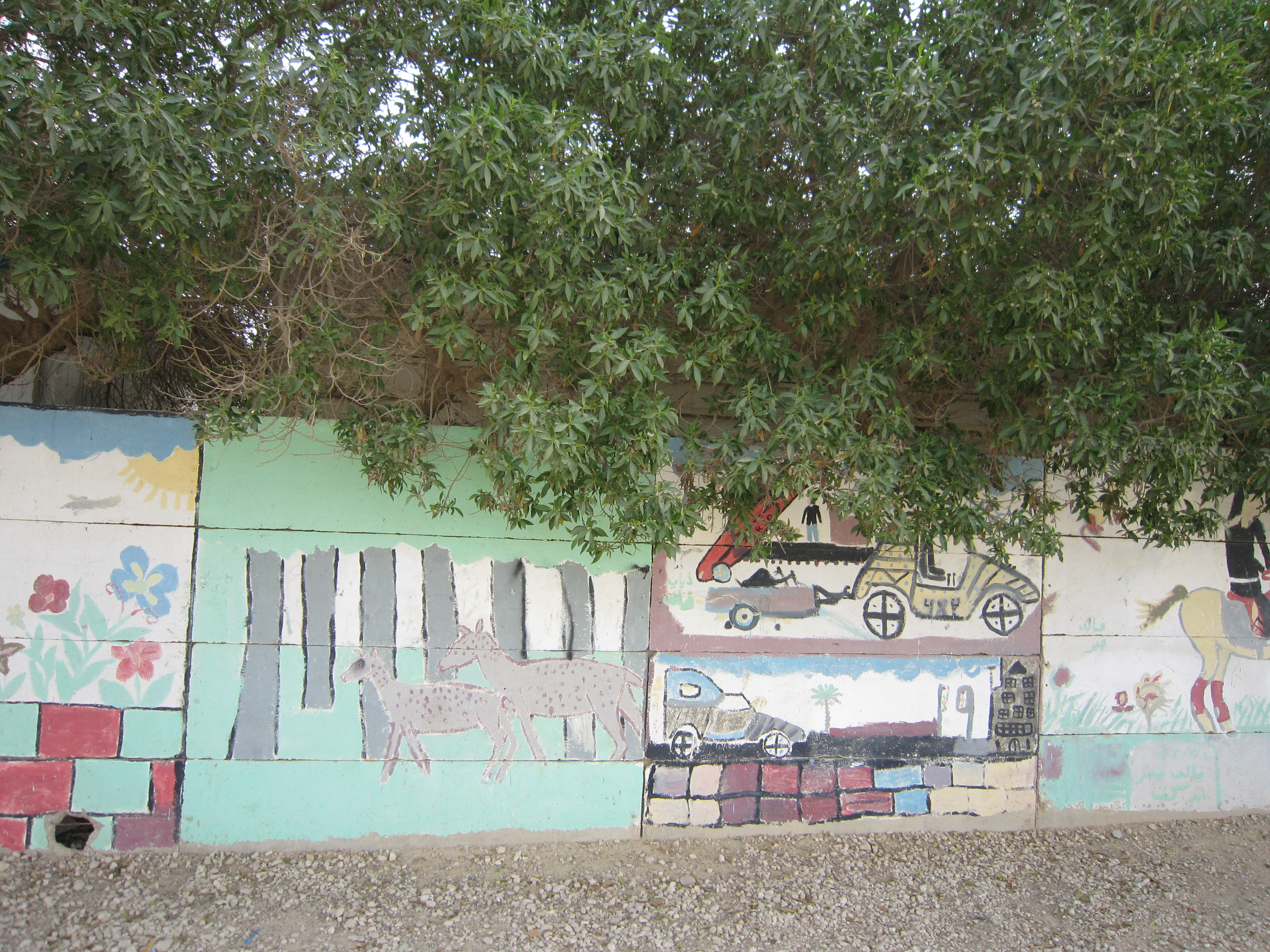
Abu Kaf Elementary School

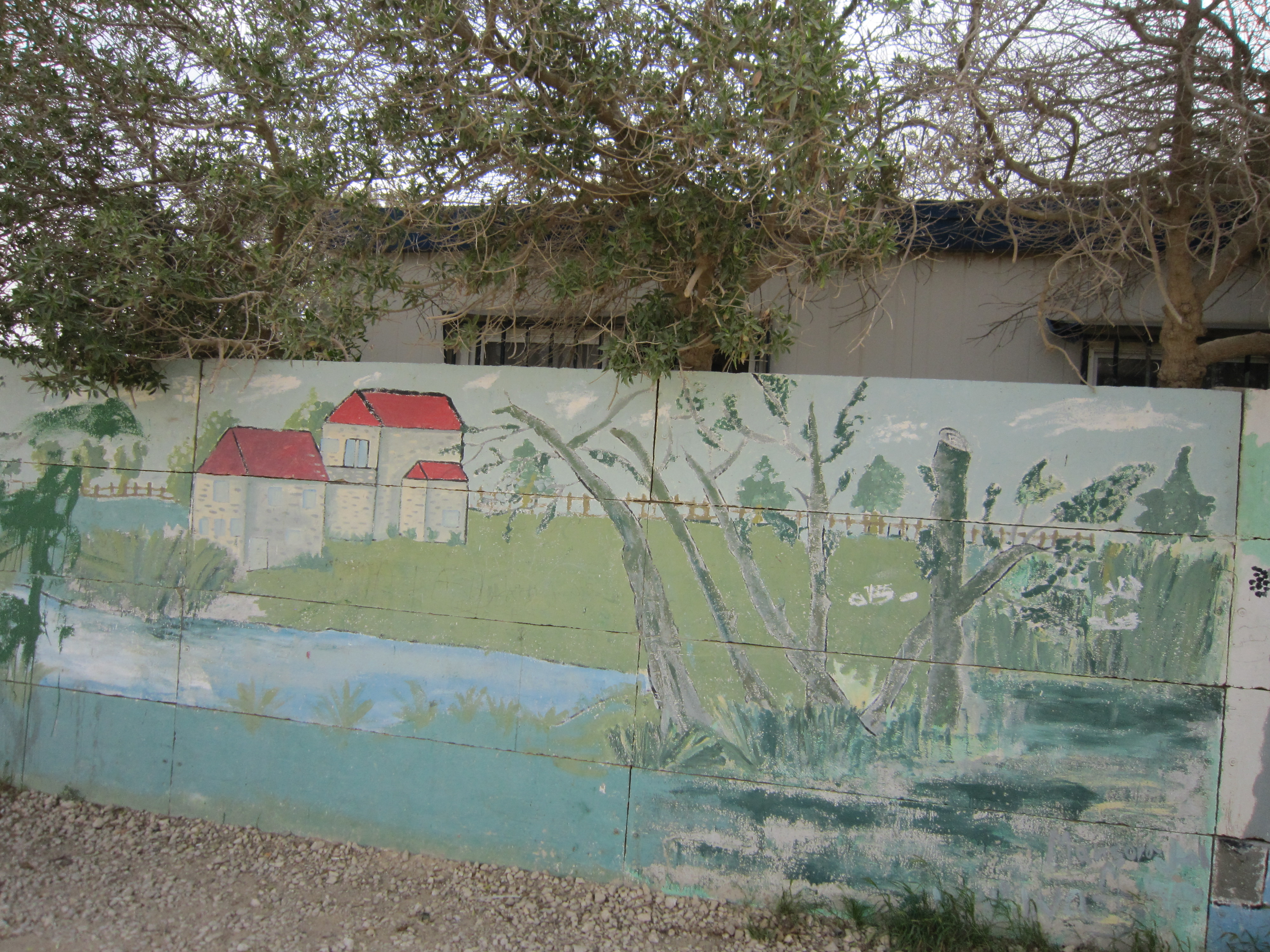
Abu Kaf Elementary School

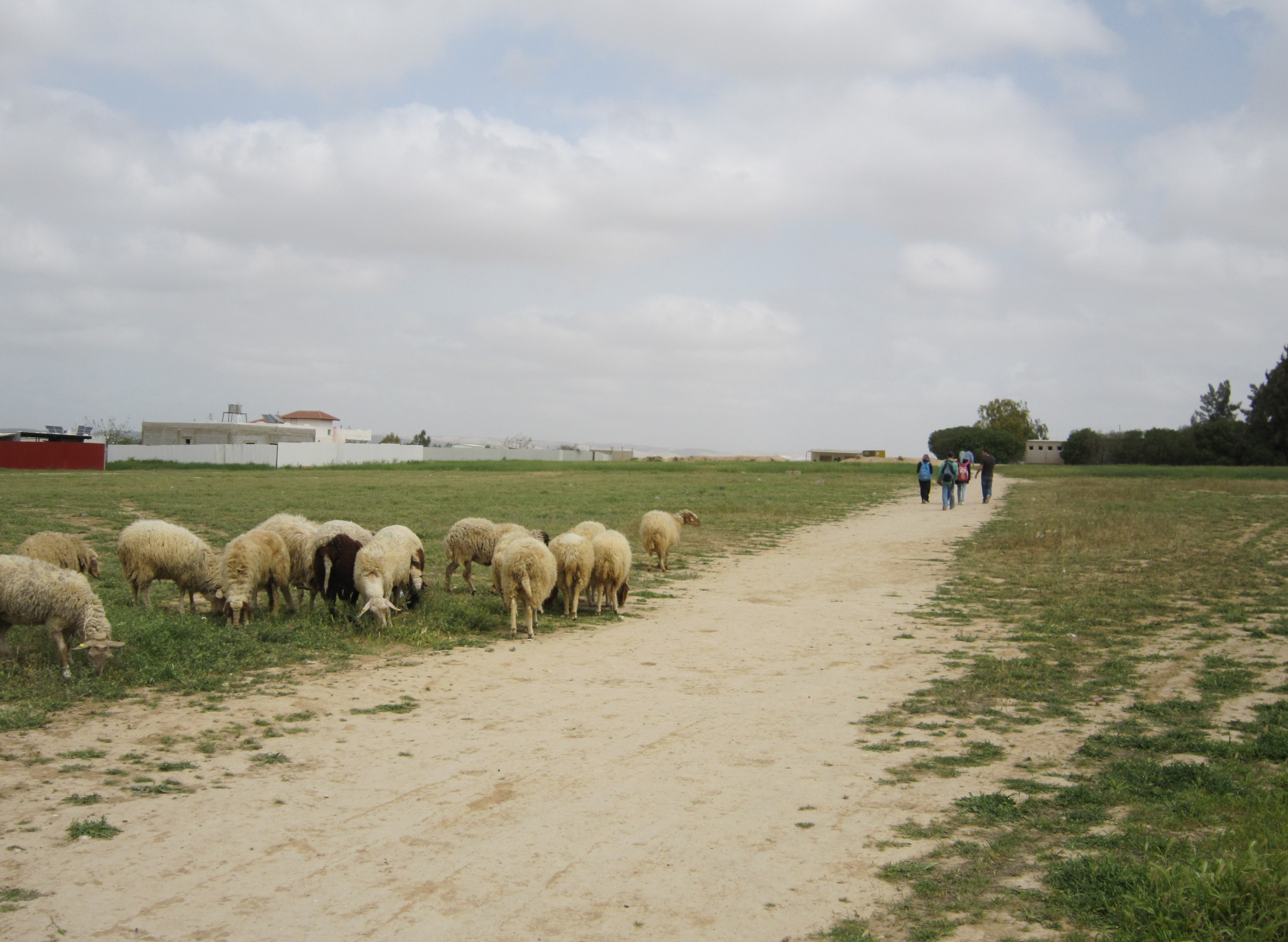
Dirt road through Umm Batin

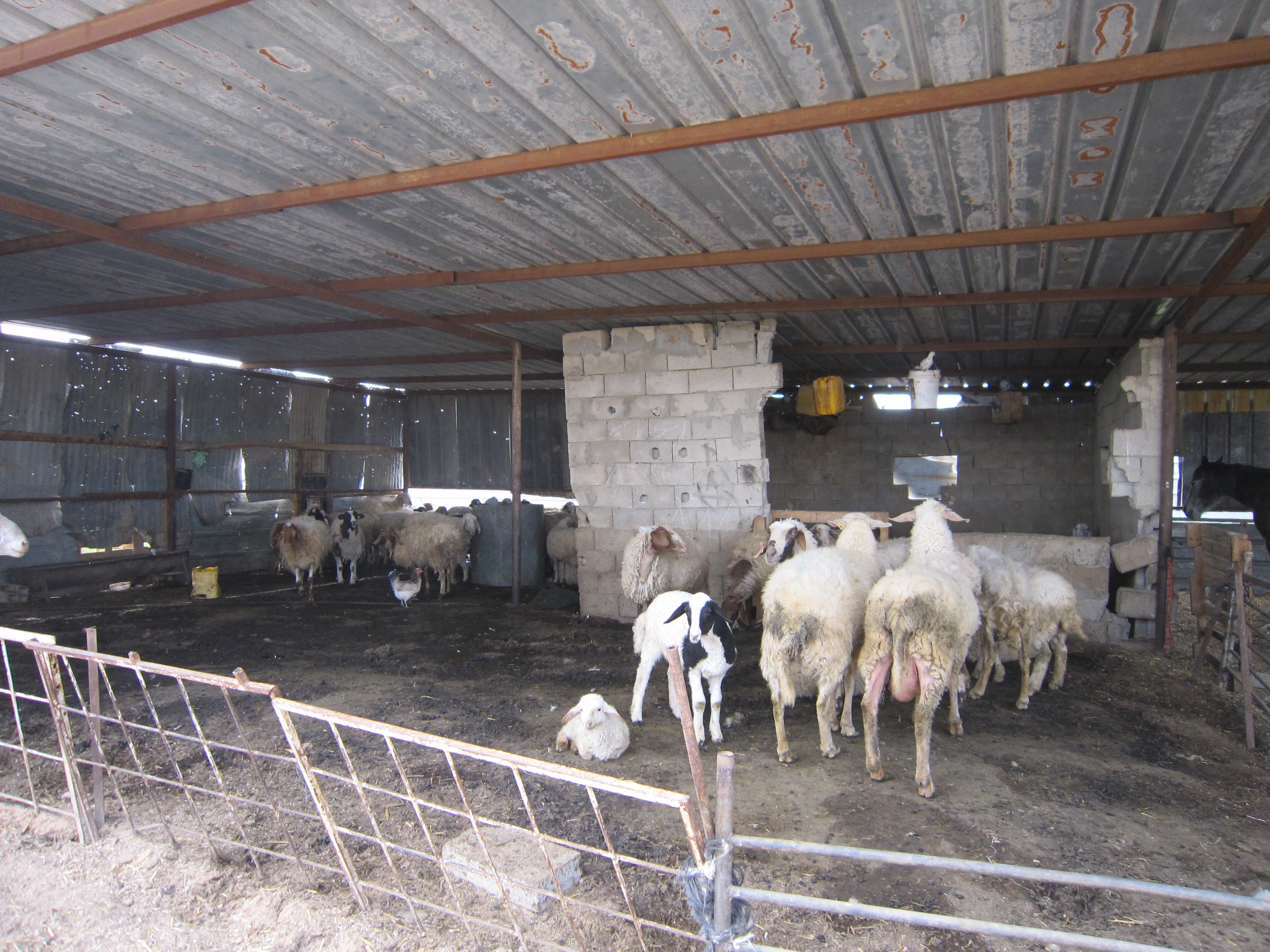
Family goat pen in Umm Batin

== Voting Patterns ==
In the 2026 election, 99 percent of voters in Umm Batin voted for the Arab parties, while 0.3 percent voted for the parties of the center-left coalition led by Gadi Eisenkot and 0.2 percent voted for the parties of the right-wing coalition led by Benjamin Netanyahu. Among the voters for the Arab parties, 95 percent voted for Ra'am, while 5 percent voted for the Joint List. Voter turnout almost doubled compared with the 2022 election.

== See also ==
- Arab localities in Israel
- Bedouin in Israel
- Negev Bedouin
- Sedentarization
