= Mini Book =

Bookstore in Beersheba, Israel, 1975-2017

- Native name: מיני בוק
- Industry: Retail
- Founded: 1975
- Founder: Carol Refaeli
- Defunct: June 2017
- Fate: Dissolved
- Headquarters: Beersheba, Israel
- Area served: Negev
- Products: Used books; Posters; Greeting cards
- Owners: Carol Refaeli (1975–2002); Gideon Refaeli (2002–04); Judy Freed (2004–17)
- Website: Active page on Facebook

Mini Book (Hebrew: מיני בוק) was a used bookstore in the Old City of Beersheba, Israel. The store sold fiction and nonfiction books in many languages, posters, and greeting cards. Mini Book served regular readers and economically disadvantaged families that had saved money by buying and selling used study books. A 2006 price comparison by Maariv showed that Mini Book was affordable even within the second-hand book segment.

== History ==
=== 20th century ===
Mini Book was founded in 1975 by Carol Refaeli, an immigrant from England. It soon became a major exchange of reading and study books for immigrant and Israeli-born populations in Beersheba and the Negev. In the 1980s, Mini Book became the anchor store of the Hadassa Passage, between Hadassa and Histadrut streets, designed and owned by the husband of Carol, prominent Beersheba architect Gideon Refaeli.

=== 21st century ===
Carol Refaeli died in 2002, after which the Rafaeli family continued operating Mini Book. In 2003, they offered Mini Book for sale.

Philadelphia-born Judy Freed acquired Mini Book in 2004. With her son, she created its website. Over time, Mini Book lost in profitability due to competition from a nonprofit used bookstore nearby, reduced customer traffic in the Old City of Beersheba, declining interest in print books, and several moves of the store. In 2015 Freed started a closeout sale and in June 2017 Mini Book closed when the owner retired.
