= Nahal Be'er Sheva =

Intermittent stream in Israel

Coordinates: 31°11′31″N 34°34′05″E

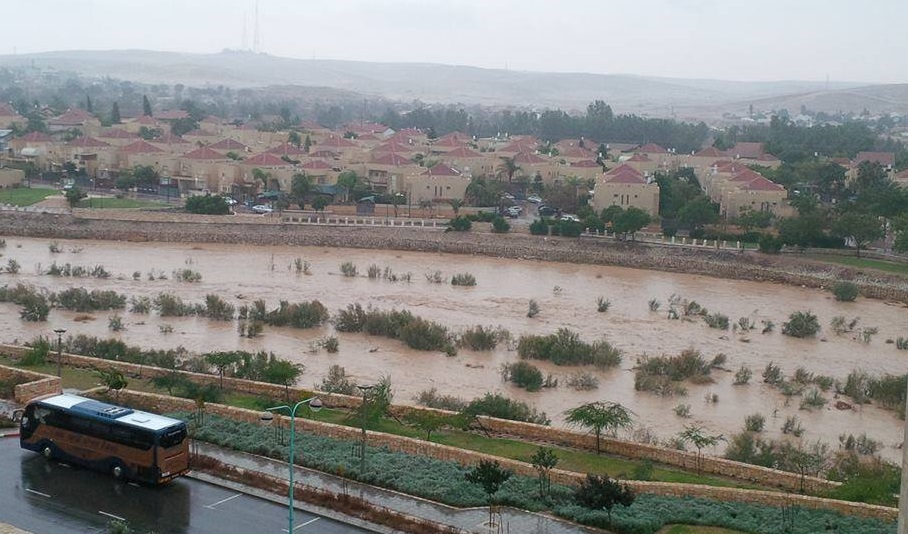
- Flooding of the stream in winter 2013 near Beersheba's Neve Noy neighbourhood
- Native name: נַחַל בְּאֵר שֶׁבַע

Location
- Country: Israel
- Region: Southern Israel
- Settlements: Kuseife, Tel as-Sabi, Be'er Sheva

Physical characteristics
- Source: Drijat
  - elevation: 570 m
- Mouth
  - location: Besor Stream
  - elevation: 140 m
- Length: 50 km (31 mi)
- Basin size: 1,700 km^{2} (660 sq mi)

The Nahal Be'er Sheva (נַחַל בְּאֵר שֶׁבַע; Beersheba Stream) is a stream in southern Israel which originates just west of Tel Arad, southeast of the Yatir Forest, and is a tributary of the Besor Stream. Its tributaries are the Nahal Yatir, the Nahal Hevron and the Nahal Sakher. It is named for the city of Beersheba, the largest city on its banks.

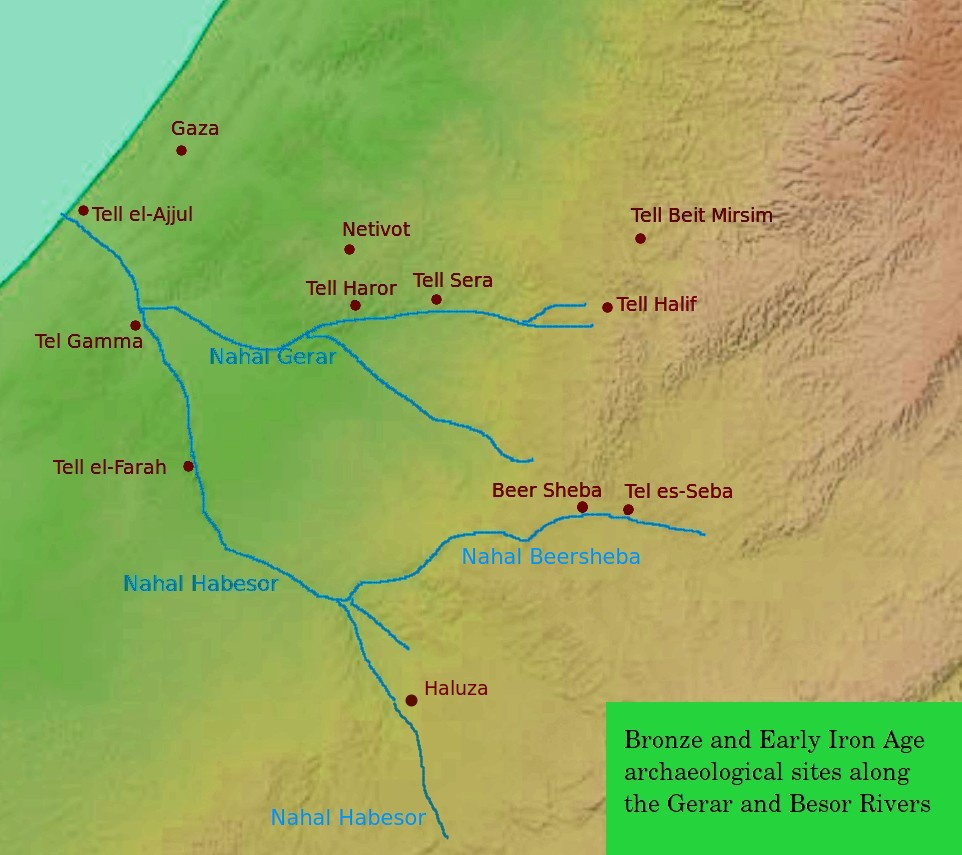
Bronze and Early Iron Age archaeological sites along the Be'er Sheva, Gerar and Besor Rivers

A major archeological site on its banks is Tel Be'er Sheva. It contains many archeological finds, including a Bedouin livestock market at the Well of Abraham, which the Bedouin called the Suq al-Waqef, a winepress and Byzantine-era tombs. It converges with the Besor Stream at a location known as the Mifgash (מפגש; Meeting place), just southeast of Tze'elim.

It rises on the Northern slope of Kina Mountain at the elevation of 570 m and flows into the Besor at the elevation of 140 m.

== Tributaries ==
The Nahal Be'er Sheva has three major tributaries.

- The Nahal Sakher (or Nahal Secher), which originates west of Qasr al-Sir and drains into the Nahal Be'er Sheva just east of the Mifgash.
- The Nahal Hevron (Arabic: Wadi al-Khalil (upstream), Wadi al-Samen (downstream)).
- The Nahal Yatir.
