= Nahal Eshtemoa =

Intermittent stream in the West Bank and Israel

Coordinates: 31°18′15″N 34°58′04″E

The Nahal Eshtemoa (נחל אשתמוע; Eshtemoa Stream), known in Arabic as the Wadi Samoa, is an intermittent stream in the West Bank and Israel that originates in eastern Yatta, the largest city on its banks. It heads southwest, passing its namesake town, Samu, the ancient Eshtemoa, then to Shim'a, then just east of Meitar, and finally to its confluence with the Nahal Yatir is just east of central Hura.

Along with its receiving stream, the Nahal Yatir, the Nahal Eshtemoa has been compared to the Storm Castle Creek, then the Squaw Creek, a tributary of the Gallatin River in Montana regarding short-term temporal variations in bedload transport rates.

== See also ==
- Besor Stream
- Nahal Be'er Sheva
- Nahal Hevron
- Judean Mountains
