= Nahal Hevron =

Stream that flows from Hebron to the Negev

Coordinates: 31°21′44.5″N 34°57′57.5″E

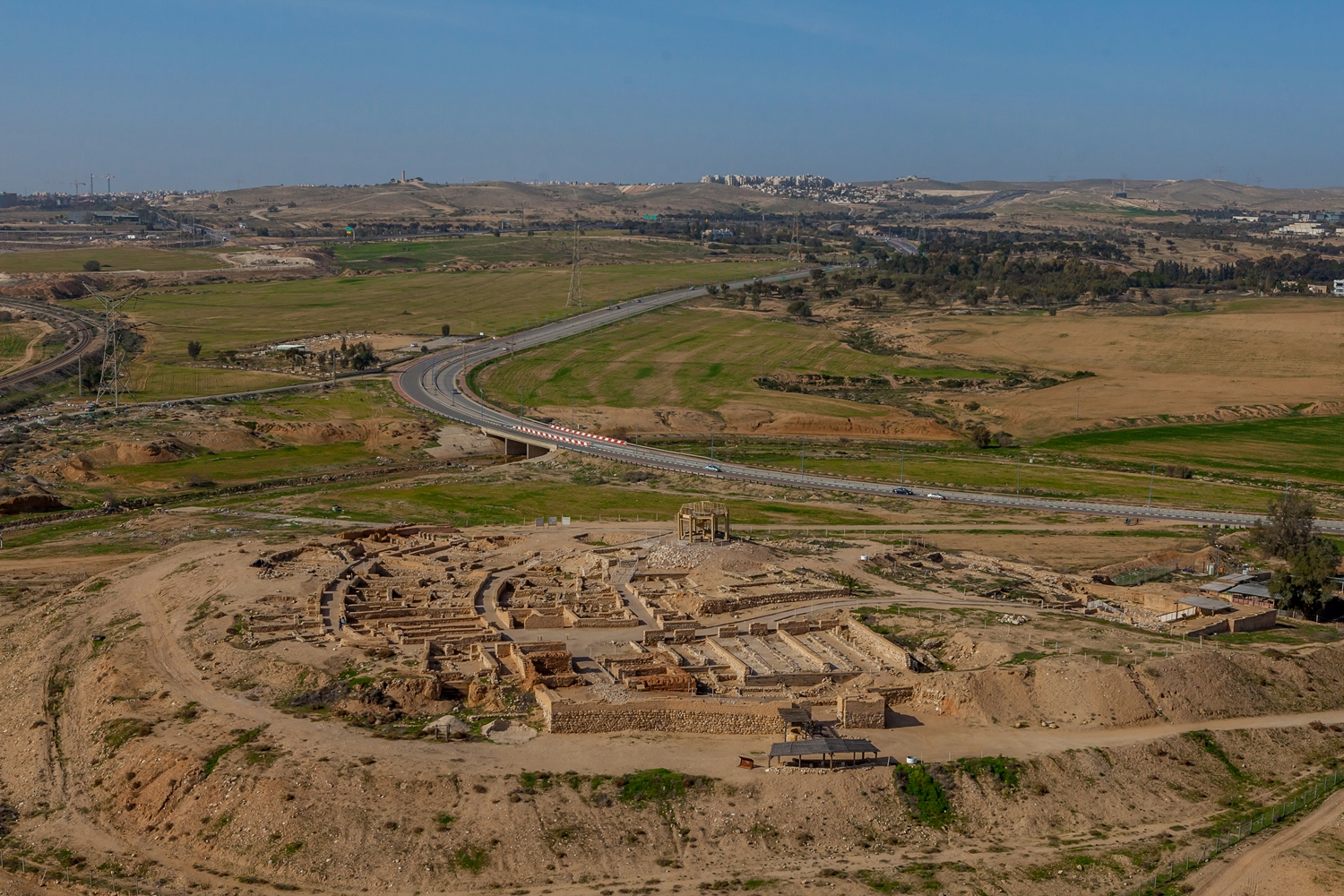
Aerial view from Tel Be'er Sheva

The Nahal Hevron (Hebrew: נחל חברון, lit. 'Hebron Stream'), known in Arabic as the Wadi al-Khalil upstream and the Wadi al-Samen downstream, is a stream that flows along the border between Judea and the Negev. The source of the Nahal Hevron is in the city of Hebron, and its mouth is its confluence with Nahal Be'er Sheva near the settlement of Omer. It is a tributary of the Nahal Be'er Sheva and part of the Besor Stream drainage basin. The stream passes near Dahariya, Beersheba, and the northern Negev before it drains into the Nahal Be'er Sheva. In the territory of the State of Israel, the stream flows through the jurisdictional areas of Meitar, the former Abu Basma, Omer, and Tel Sheva, under the responsibility of the Ministry of the Interior.

== Pollution ==
Stream flowing wastewater from cities and industries, and wastewater from sawmills and quarries originating from Palestinian cities, residential areas, and quarries built along it. In the Be'er Sheva Valley, sewage is a significant environmental hazard because thousands of people live close to the river bed.

The main source of pollution is the sewage of Hebron and Kiryat Arba, estimated at 15,000 cubic meters per day, which also pollutes the Besor Nature Reserve, which changes the nature of the stream from a failed stream that flows high-quality floodwater into a stream with a permanent flow of polluted sewage. Sewage flows throughout the year, polluting the stream and groundwater in the stream, and there are additions of urban and industrial effluents.

The Ministry of Environmental Protection, the Society for the Protection of Nature in Israel (SPNI), and the Shikma-Besor Drainage Authority operate an educational program in the Hebron Stream called "Longing for the River". The three-year plan is aimed at people living in the vicinity of the Hebron River to develop awareness and responsibility for the river and its surroundings. The program relates to how the knowledge base, connection, and belonging between different population groups and the stream can be created with the participation of the formal and informal education system.

In October 2026, Israeli police arrested a Palestinian man for polluting the Hebron Stream by dumping sewage from a tanker truck. He recorded himself carrying out the act while saying "These are our actions that we are proud of", stating that this was his way of harming Israel and its citizens.

== See also ==
- Nahal Eshtemoa
- Judean Mountains
- Shephelah
