= Nahal Yatir =

Intermittent stream in Israel

Coordinates: 31°13′55″N 34°53′16″E

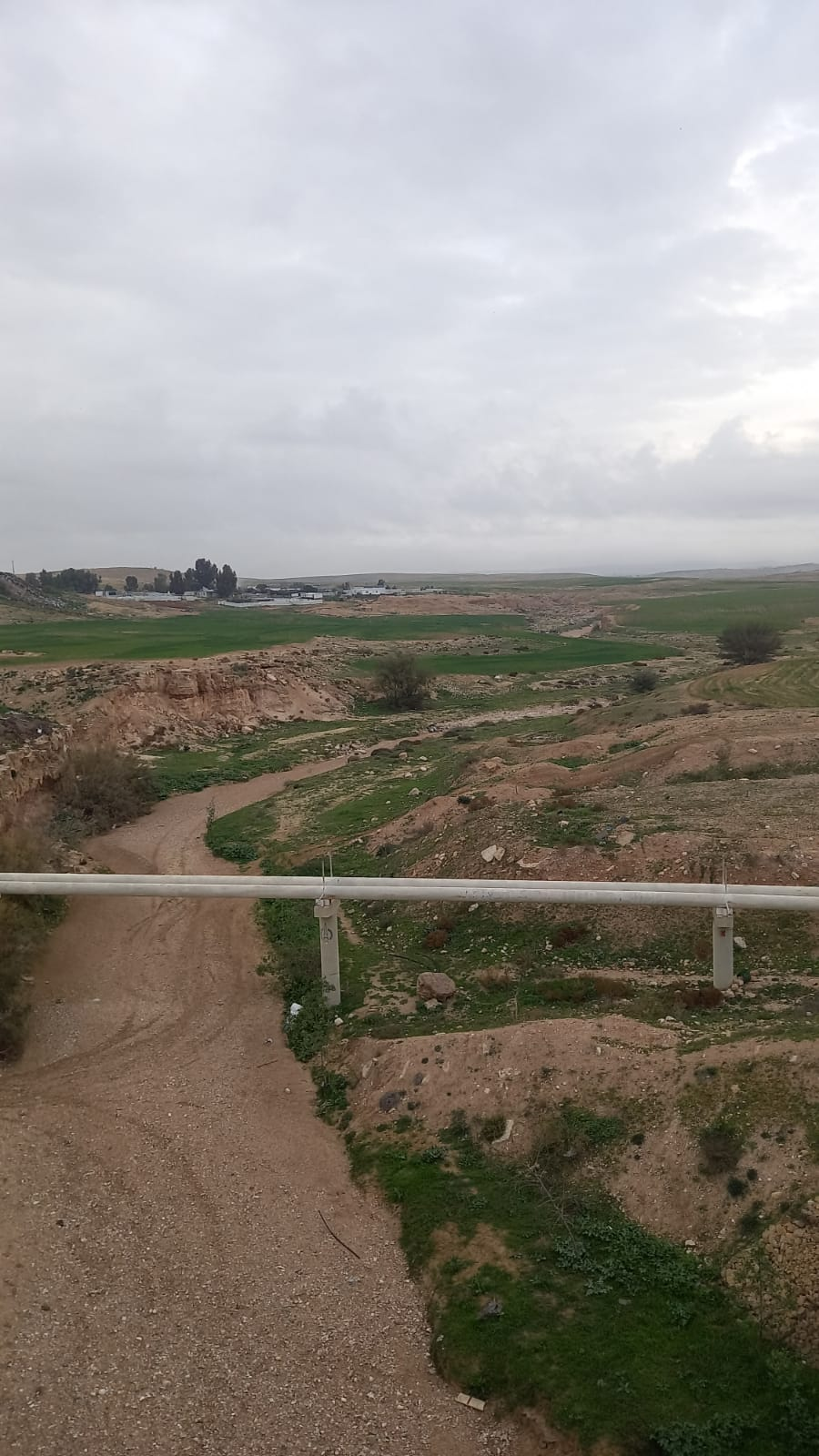
Aerial view of the Nahal Yatir's riverbed

The Nahal Yatir (נחל יתיר; Yatir Stream) is an intermittent stream in southern Israel that originates in its namesake Yatir Forest and is a tributary of the Nahal Be'er Sheva. Heading southwest from its origin, it runs east, then south of Hura and continues its southwest course through other locales in the Neve Midbar Regional Council and drains into the Nahal Be'er Sheva just north of Nevatim. The largest city on its banks is Hura and the largest city in its drainage basin is Yatta.

A major archaeological site on its banks is a Persian fortress, Horvat Nahal Yatir, located just south of the Yatir Forest. An Aramaic-language Idumean ostracon dating to the Persian period was found there with the ostracon's text containing a receipt for a large quantity of barley. Horvat Nahal Yatir's site plan includes a Bar Kokhba fortress and a Persian fortress.

Along with its primary tributary, the Nahal Eshtemoa, the Nahal Yatir has been compared to the Storm Castle Creek, then the Squaw Creek, a tributary of the Gallatin River in Montana regarding short-term temporal variations in bedload transport rates.

== Tributaries ==
The Nahal Yatir has two main tributaries, the Nahal Eshtemoa and the Nahal Bikhra.

=== Nahal Bikhra ===
The Nahal Bikhra (נחל בכרה; Bikhra Stream) is a small tributary originating just east of its namesake archeological site, Horvat Bikhra and draining into the Nahal Yatir just east of southern Hura.
