= Tel Be'er Sheva =

Archaeological site in Israel

Tel Sheva
- תל באר שבע (Hebrew)
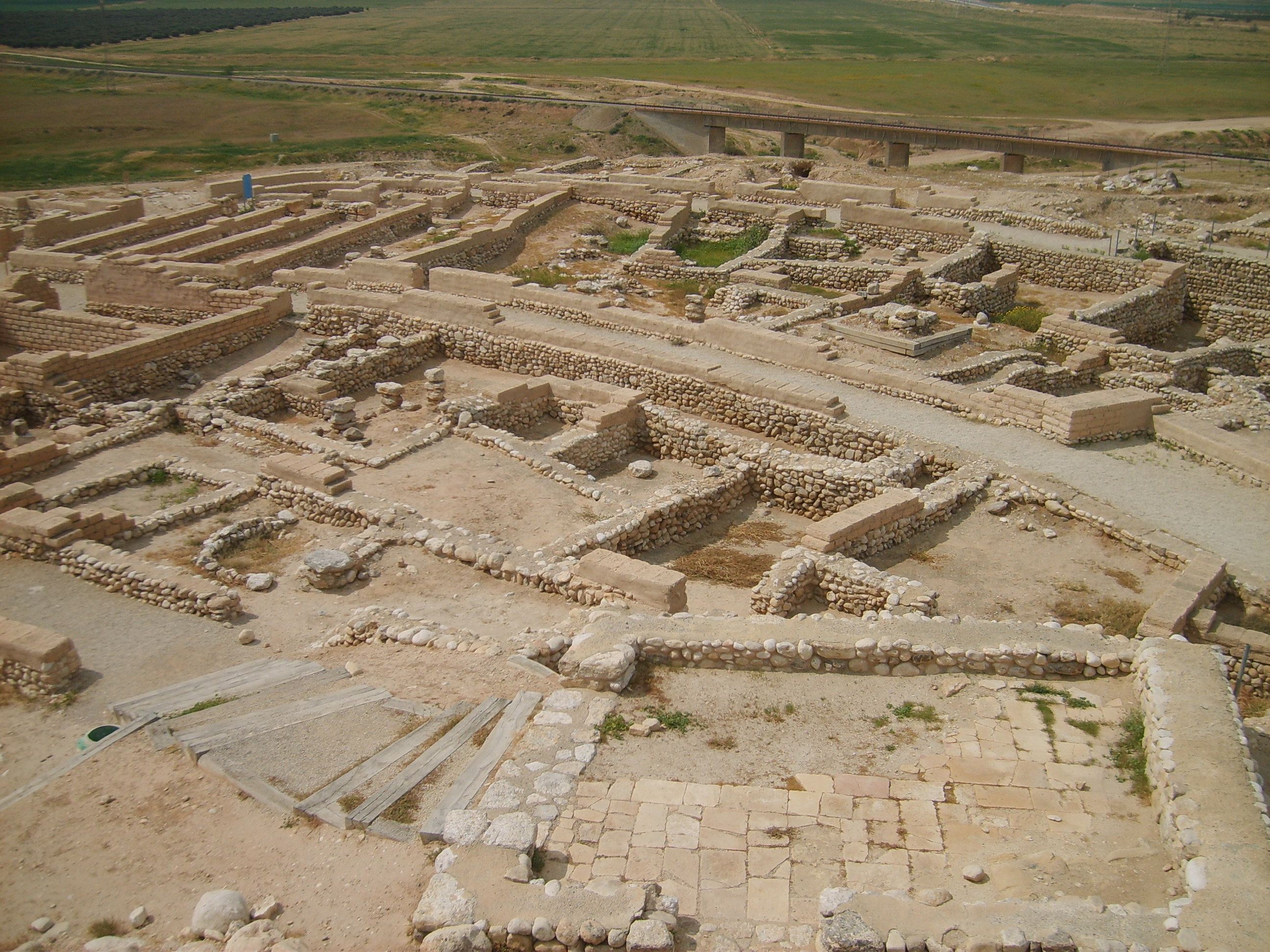
- Overview

- Location within Israel Location within West and Central Asia
- 31°14′41″N 34°50′27″E
- Type: Settlement
- Periods: Iron Age
- Cultures: Israelite
- Associated with: Israelites, Judahites
- Location: Near Beersheba, Southern District, Israel
- Region: Beersheba Valley, biblical Negev

UNESCO World Heritage Site
- Official name: Biblical Tells – Megiddo, Hazor, Beer Sheba
- Type: Cultural
- Criteria: ii, iii, iv, vi
- Designated: 2005 (29th session)
- Reference no.: 1108
- Region: Asia-Pacific

Tel Sheva (Hebrew: תל שבע; name used by scholars), Tel Be'er Sheva (Hebrew: תל באר שבע; popular name), or Tell es-Seba (Arabic: تل السبع), is an archaeological site in the Southern District of Israel, believed to be the site of the ancient biblical town of Beer-sheba. The site lies east of modern Beersheba and west of the Bedouin town of Tel Sheva. Tel Sheva has been preserved and made accessible to visitors in the Tel Be'er Sheva National Park (Hebrew: גן לאומי תל באר שבע).

== Etymology ==
The Hebrew name of Beersheba is derived from be'er, meaning a 'well', and sheva, meaning 'oath' or 'seven'.

== History ==
Beer-sheba is mentioned 33 times in the Hebrew Bible. It is often used when describing the borders of the Land of Israel: "From Dan to Beersheba".

It was the site of many patriarchal narratives: Abraham dwelt at Beer-sheba (Genesis 22:19), Abraham and Abimelech entered a covenant at Beer-sheba (Genesis 21:32), and Abraham planted a tamarisk tree at Beer-sheba (Genesis 21:33). The Lord spoke to both Isaac and Jacob, Abraham's son and grandson respectively, at Beer-sheba (Genesis 26:23; 46:1).

Two biblical wells were located in Beer-sheba: Abraham's well, seized by Abimelech's men (Genesis 21:25), and the well dug by Isaac's servants (Genesis 26:25).

== Excavation ==
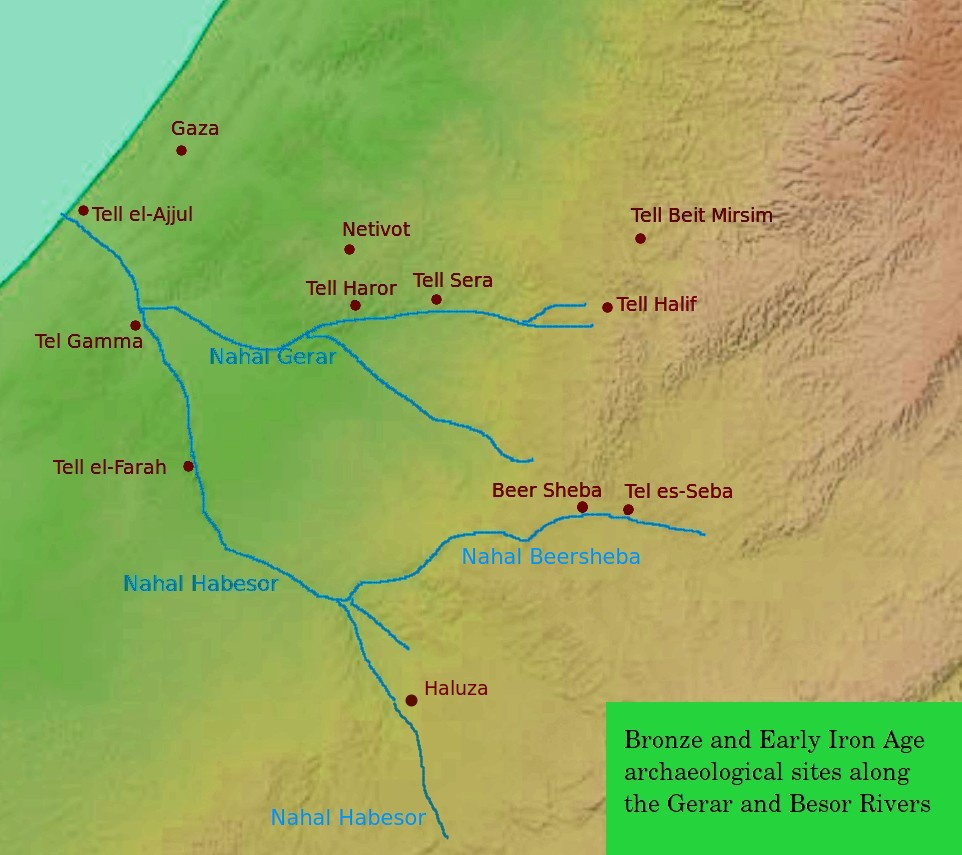
Tel Sheva in the regional context of Bronze and Early Iron Age tells

Tel Beer-sheba, the site of the Iron Age city, is located on a hill overlooking the Wadi Beer-sheba about two and a half miles east of the modern city of Beersheba. The site was excavated from 1969 to 1976 by the Tel Aviv University Institute of Archaeology, directed by Prof. Yohanan Aharoni, except for the last season which was led by Prof. Ze'ev Herzog. Most of the dig was devoted to uncovering the large fortified Israelite city. The biblical narrative places the city in the time of the United Monarchy of King David, whose reign is dated by biblical scholars to around 1000 BCE, and later, to the Kingdom of Judah (980–701 BCE). During the last three seasons of excavation (1974–1976), an effort was made to go below Beer-sheba of Iron Age II to find earlier occupation. A considerable part of the site was dug down to bedrock in order to find the earliest settlements at Beer-sheba. This effort revealed four earlier occupational strata (Strata VI through IX). Excavations were renewed by Prof Herzog between 1993 and 1995 in order to complete the uncovering of the town's water system.

== Iron Age I ==
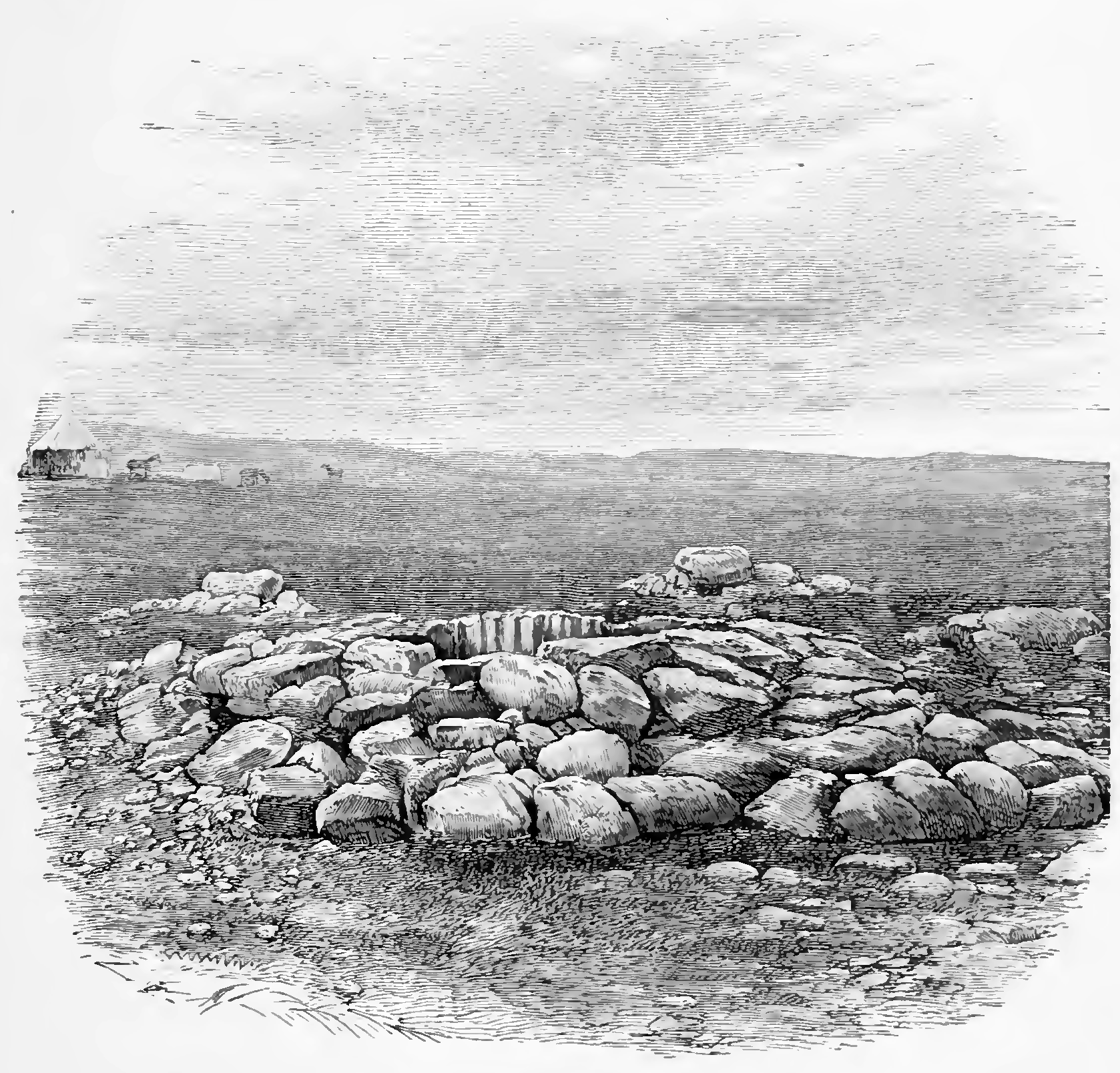
Abraham's Well, 1855

The earliest occupation at Beer-sheba during Iron Age I (Stratum IX) was represented only by seven large pits about 22 to 25 feet in diameter. Archaeologists believe that the entire settlement of this stratum covered about 2,990 sq. yards, approximately the area of half of a football field. It likely contained about 20 dwelling pits and 10 granaries and would have housed from 100 to 140 people. Stratum IX was abandoned then reused, new structures being added to the old. In Stratum VIII, which dates to the 11th century B.C.E., archaeologists found houses for the first time. Like Stratum IX, Stratum VIII was abandoned rather than destroyed. The pottery suggests that the same people who lived in Stratum VIII built Stratum VII at the end of the 11th century B.C.E., which comprised five domestic units in a possibly enclosed settlement.

== Iron Age II ==
The settlement of Beer-sheba was probably first fortified during the Iron IIA. Some archaeologists believe that Beer-sheba, which was on the southern border of the fledgling Israelite kingdom, was fortified by King Saul at the end of the 11th century BCE during wars against the Amalekites based upon a historical reading of the biblical account. However, on the basis of interregional comparisons and recent radiocarbon evidence, this settlement phase probably started in the mid-10th century and ended in the late 9th century BCE.

The best preserved layout of the Iron II city may be reconstructed from Stratum II, which dates to the late 8th century BCE during the Iron IIB. At this time, the city was destroyed in a conflagration, possibly during the campaign of Sennacherib in 701 BCE. Reconstructed plans of the city suggest that Beer-sheba was planned as a coherent entity with areas for administrative structures and for dwellings incorporated into a single system. Fortifications included a casemate wall and a four-room city gate. Drains running under some of the streets conducted rain-water out of the city and a well-preserved water system of cisterns provided the inhabitants with water. The incorporation of the houses into the casemate wall suggests that its occupants were directly responsible for the city's defense and reflects the military and administrative function of the entire city. Archaeologists estimate around 350 people lived in the city of Beer-sheba during this period.

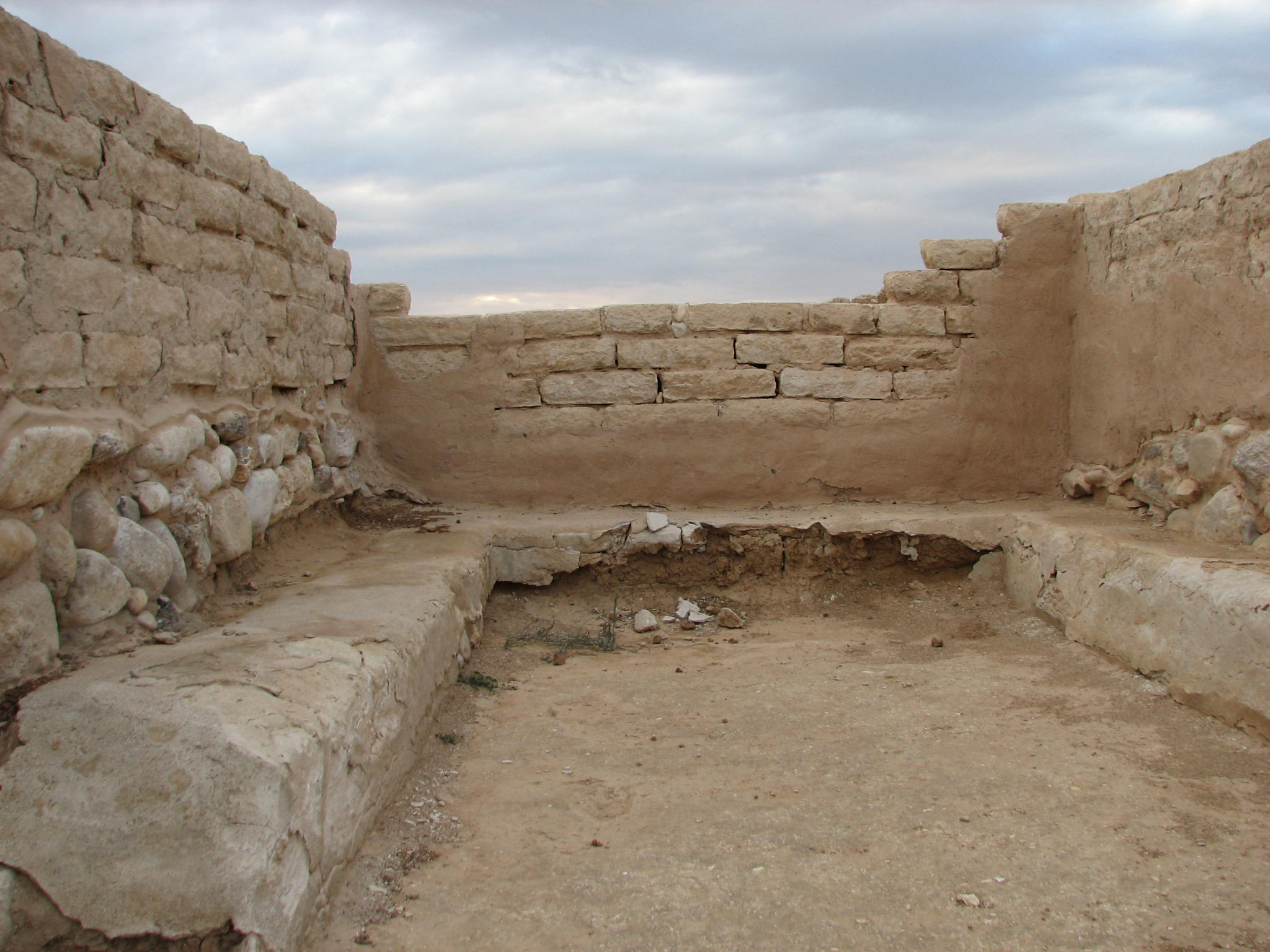
The inner courtyard of Tel Beer Sheva.

== Later periods ==
Excavations revealed traces of a tribal cemetery Late Ottoman infant jar-burials often associated with nomads or itinerant workers of Egyptian origins.

== Horned altar ==
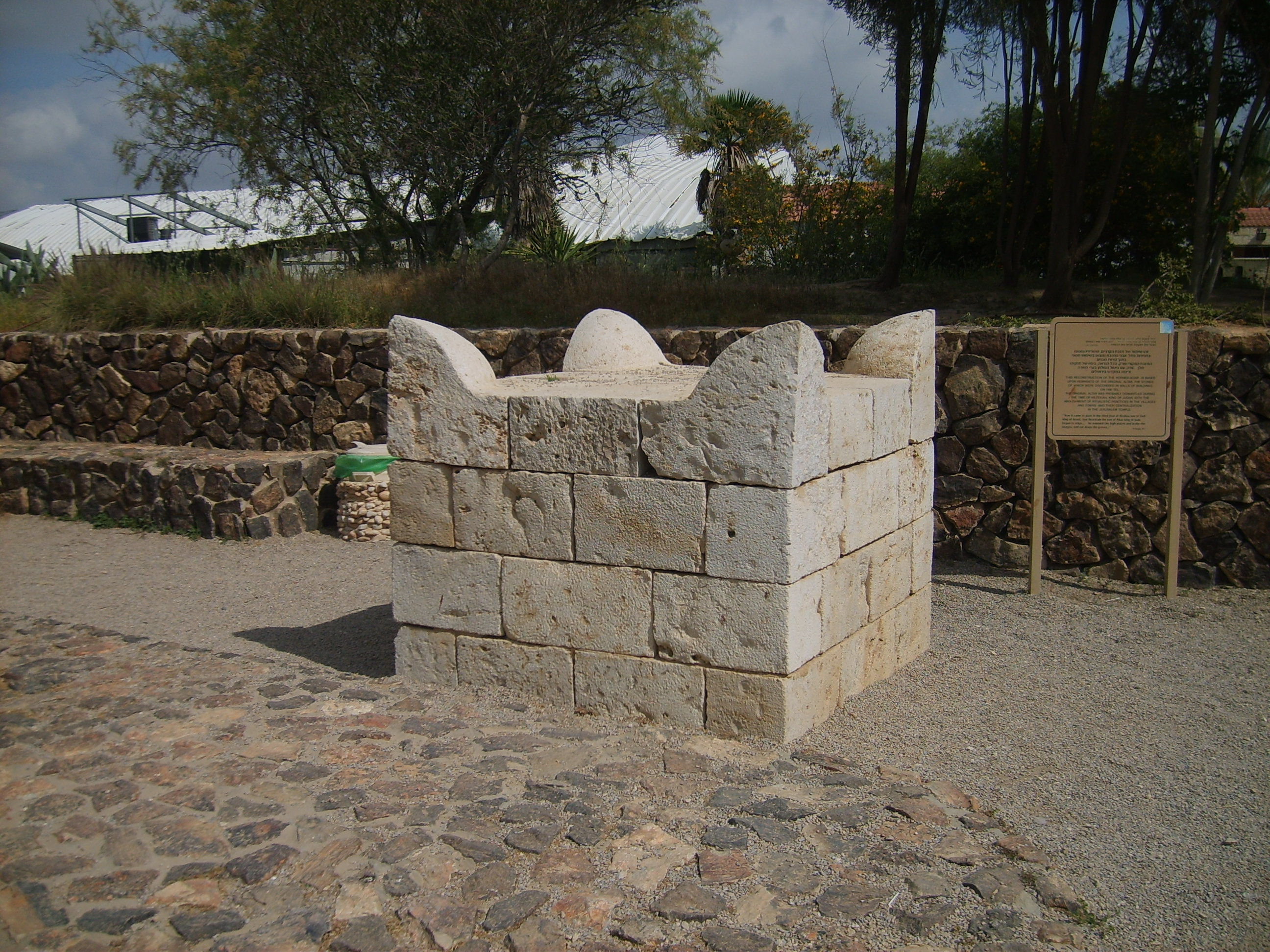
Replica of horned altar (the original is in the Israel Museum)

One of the most significant discoveries at Tel Beer-sheba is that of a horned altar, the first ever unearthed in Israel. Altars with horns at each of their four corners are mentioned frequently in the Bible (Lev. 4:7, 18, 25; Ex. 29:12, 30:2; 38:2; 1 Kings 1:50; 2:28). The altar was not found assembled in situ, but was discovered in secondary use, the stones of the altar been incorporated into a later-date wall.

As of 1975, there was an unresolved debate about the dating of the altar between Professor Aharoni and Professor Yigael Yadin of the Hebrew University. Professor Aharoni believed that the Beer-sheba altar was one of the altars which were dismantled as part of Hezekiah's religious reforms. Its stones were then reused in an 8th-century wall, and the wall itself was destroyed at the end of the 8th century, probably during Sennacherib's Judean campaign of 701 B.C. However, Professor Yadin dates this wall more than 100 years later than Professor Aharoni. According to Professor Yadin, the wall was probably destroyed about the time the Babylonians captured and destroyed Jerusalem (587 B.C.).

Professor Aharoni's interpretation would seem to strongly support a correlation with the biblical account of the cultic reform carried out by King Hezekiah, who ruled around 715–686 BCE (2 Kings 18:22).

== National park; UNESCO recognition ==
The site was restored by the Israel Nature and Parks Authority in 1990. In 2003, its water system was opened to the public as well. The excavated town is now open for visitors under the name Tel Be'er Sheva National Park.

In 2007, Tel Sheva was recognized as a UNESCO World Heritage Site. Of more than 200 tells in Israel, Beersheba was cited as one of the most representative, containing substantial remains of a city with biblical connections.

== See also ==
- "Abraham's well", a well dating to at least the 12th century CE; at Beersheba
- Archaeology of Israel
