= Abraham's Well =

Historic water well in Beersheba, Israel

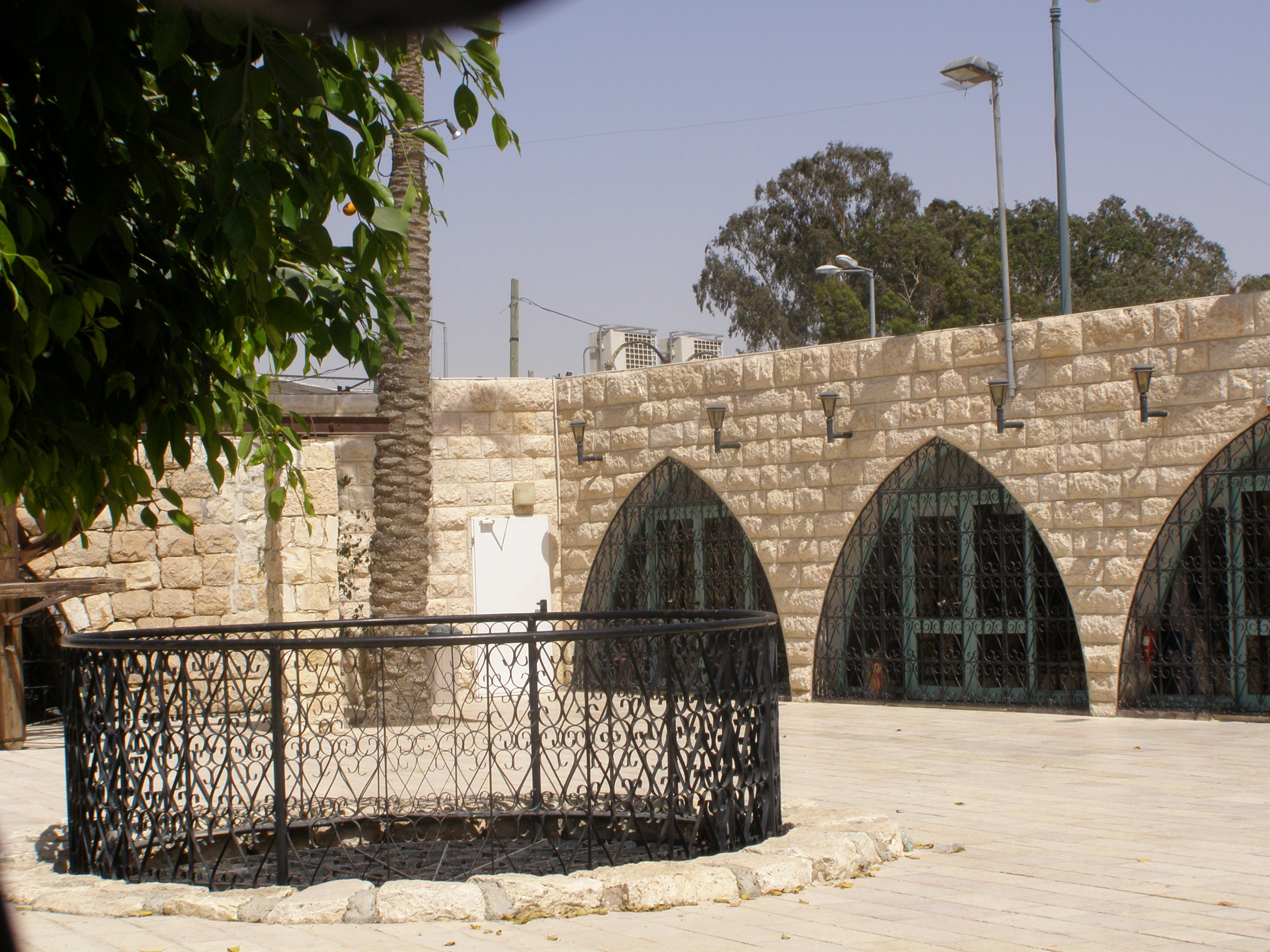
- Location: 2 Hebron Road, Beersheba
- Coordinates: 31°14′14.01″N 34°47′35.08″E
- Type: history
- Website: abraham.org.il

Abraham's Well (Hebrew: באר אברהם) is a historical water well in Beersheba, Israel, associated with the biblical narrative of Abraham. Its structure houses the archaeology museum of Beersheba.

== History ==
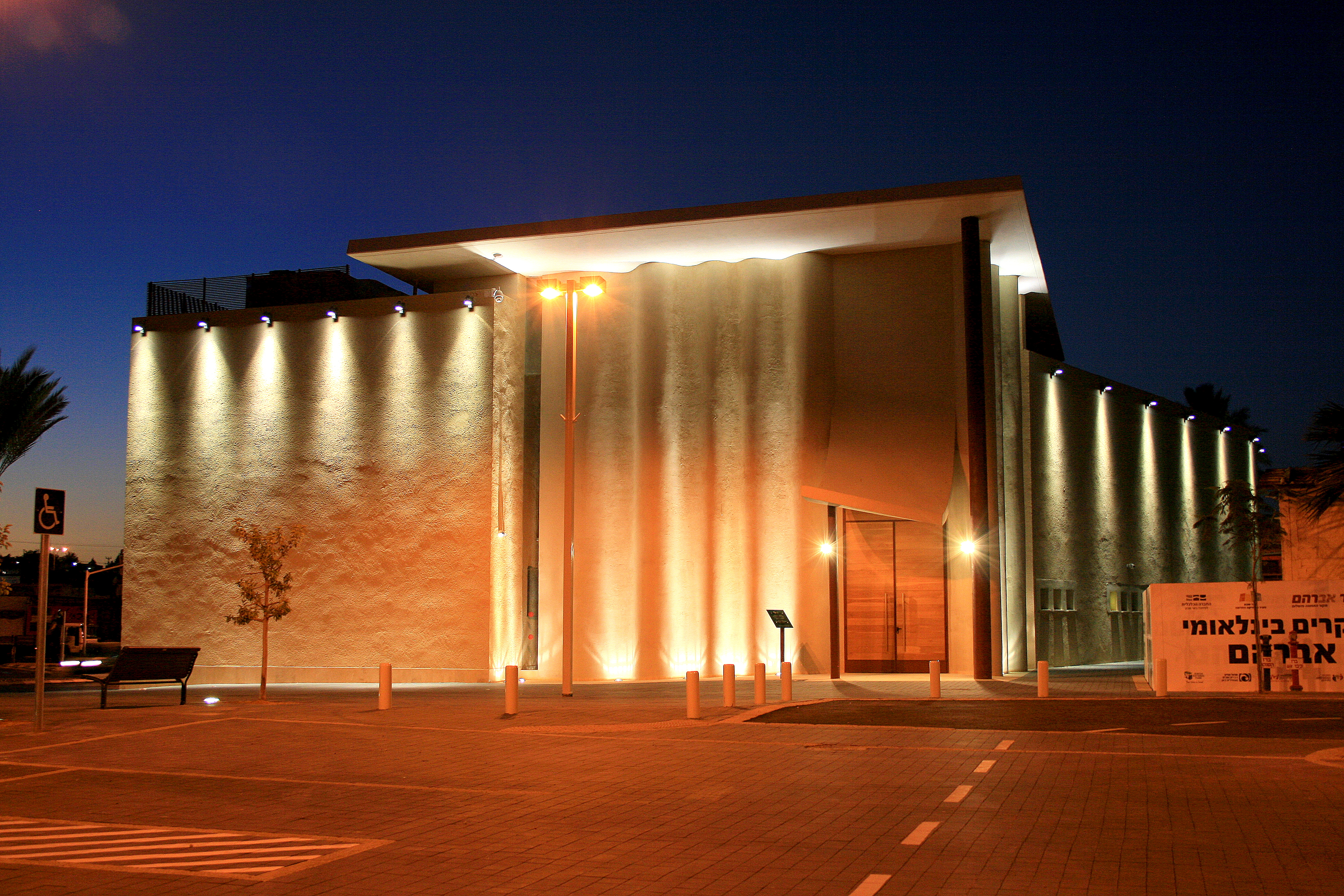
Abraham's Well visitors center, Beersheba

According to the Hebrew Bible, Abraham's well was seized by Abimelech's men (Genesis 21:25), and Isaac’s servants also dug a well at Beersheba (Genesis 26:25).

The well is near the Old City of Beersheba and a wadi, Nahal Be'er Sheva, on the road to Neve Noy. It was described by Edward Robinson in 1838. In 1897, a local sheikh built a house above the well.

== Travellers' descriptions ==
Edward Robinson's description of the site:

These wells are some distance apart; they are circular, and stoned up with solid masonry. The larger one is twelve and a half feet in diameter and forty-four and a half feet deep to the surface of the water, sixteen feet of which, at the bottom, is excavated in the solid rock. The other well lies fifty-five rods W.S.W., and is five feet in diameter and forty-two feet deep. The water in both is pure and sweet, and in great abundance; the finest, indeed, we had found since leaving Sinai... Here then is the place where the patriarchs Abraham, Isaac, and Jacob often dwelt! Here Abraham dug perhaps this very well; and journeyed from hence with Isaac to Mount Moriah, to offer him up there in sacrifice.

It was also described by Claude Reignier Conder in the late 19th century:

...the principal well, which is twelve feet three inches in diameter, and over forty-five feet deep, lined with rings of masonry to a depth of twenty-eight feet. A second well, five feet in diameter, exists about 300 yards to the west, and on the east is a third, which is dry, twenty-three feet deep, and nine feet two inches in diameter. The sides of all the wells are furrowed by the ropes of the water-drawers; but we made one discovery which was rather disappointing, namely, that the masonry is not very ancient. Fifteen courses down, on the south side of the large well, there is a stone with an inscription in Arabic, on a tablet dated, as well as I could make out, 505 A.H., or in the twelfth century. This stone must be at least as old as those at the mouth, which are furrowed with more than a hundred channels by the ropes of seven centuries of water-drawers.

== See also ==
- Archaeology of Israel
- Tourism in Israel
