= Neighborhoods of Beersheba =

Neighborhoods in Beersheba, Israel

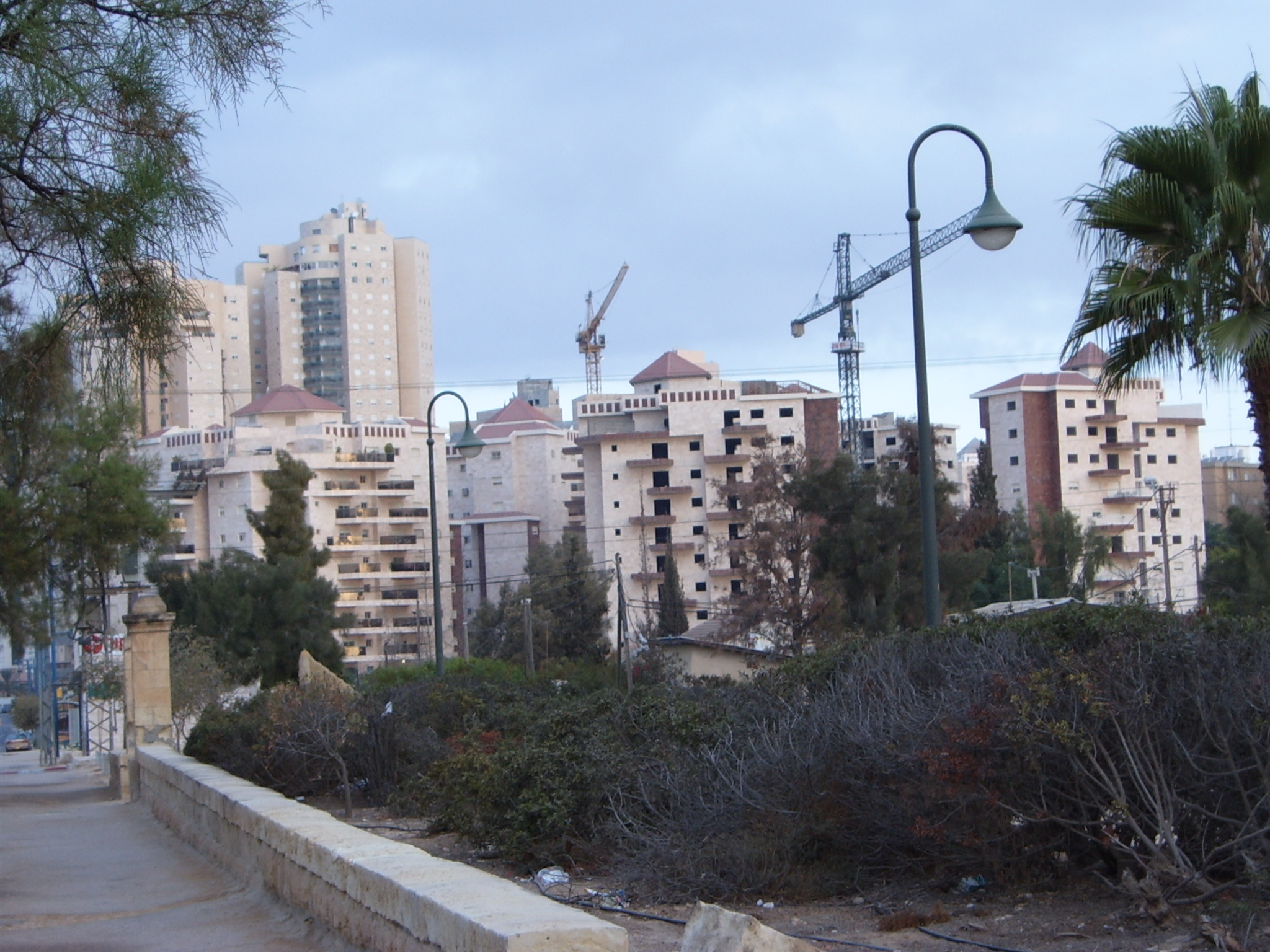
Modern construction in Beersheba

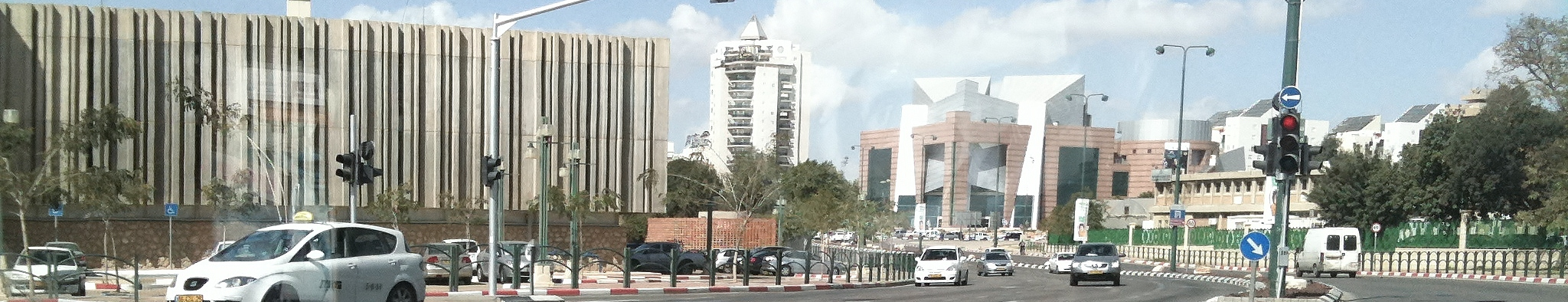

The neighborhoods of Beersheba are urban and residential districts in the city of Beersheba, Southern District, Israel.

== Old City ==
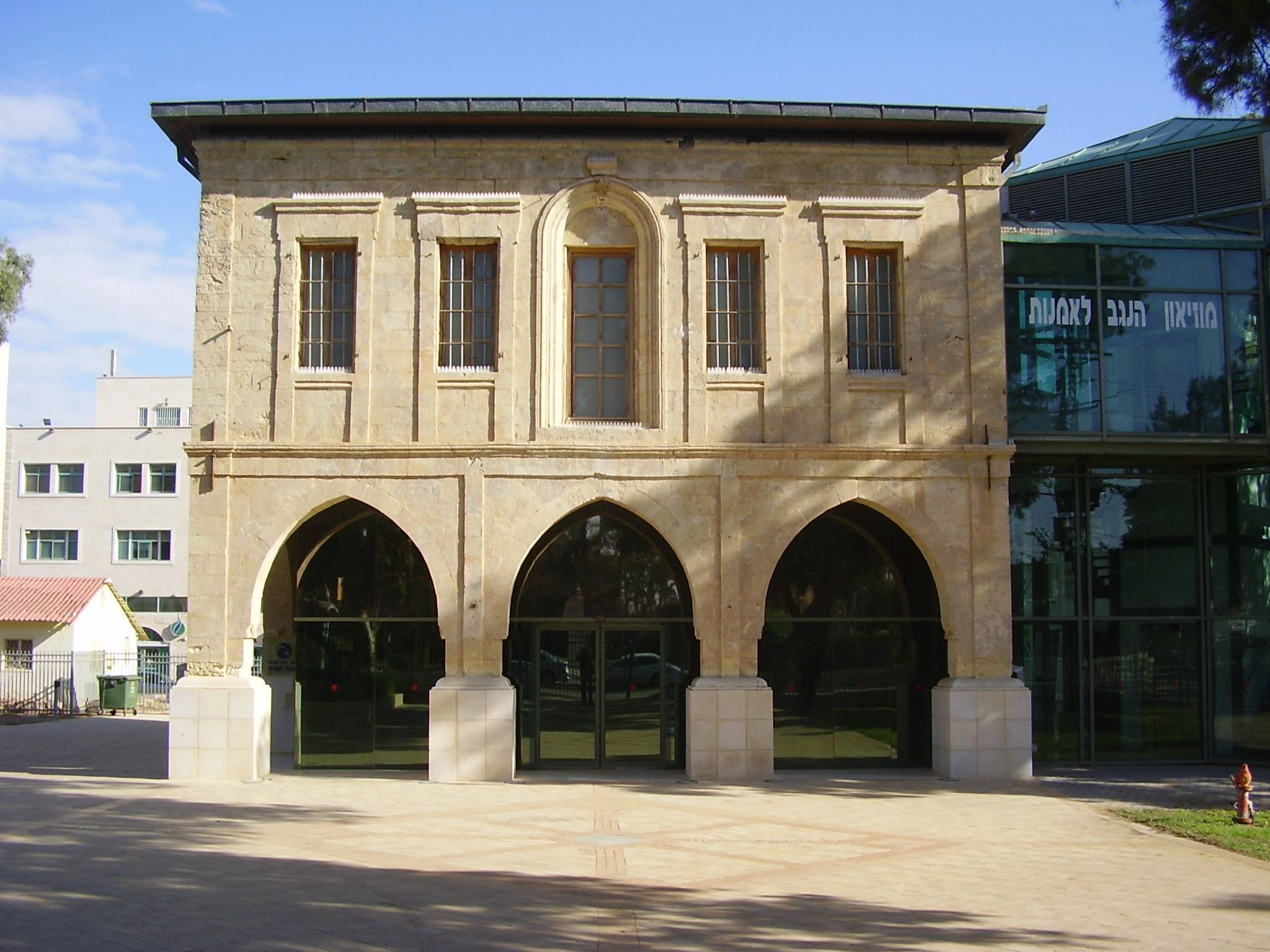
The Negev Art Museum in the Old City

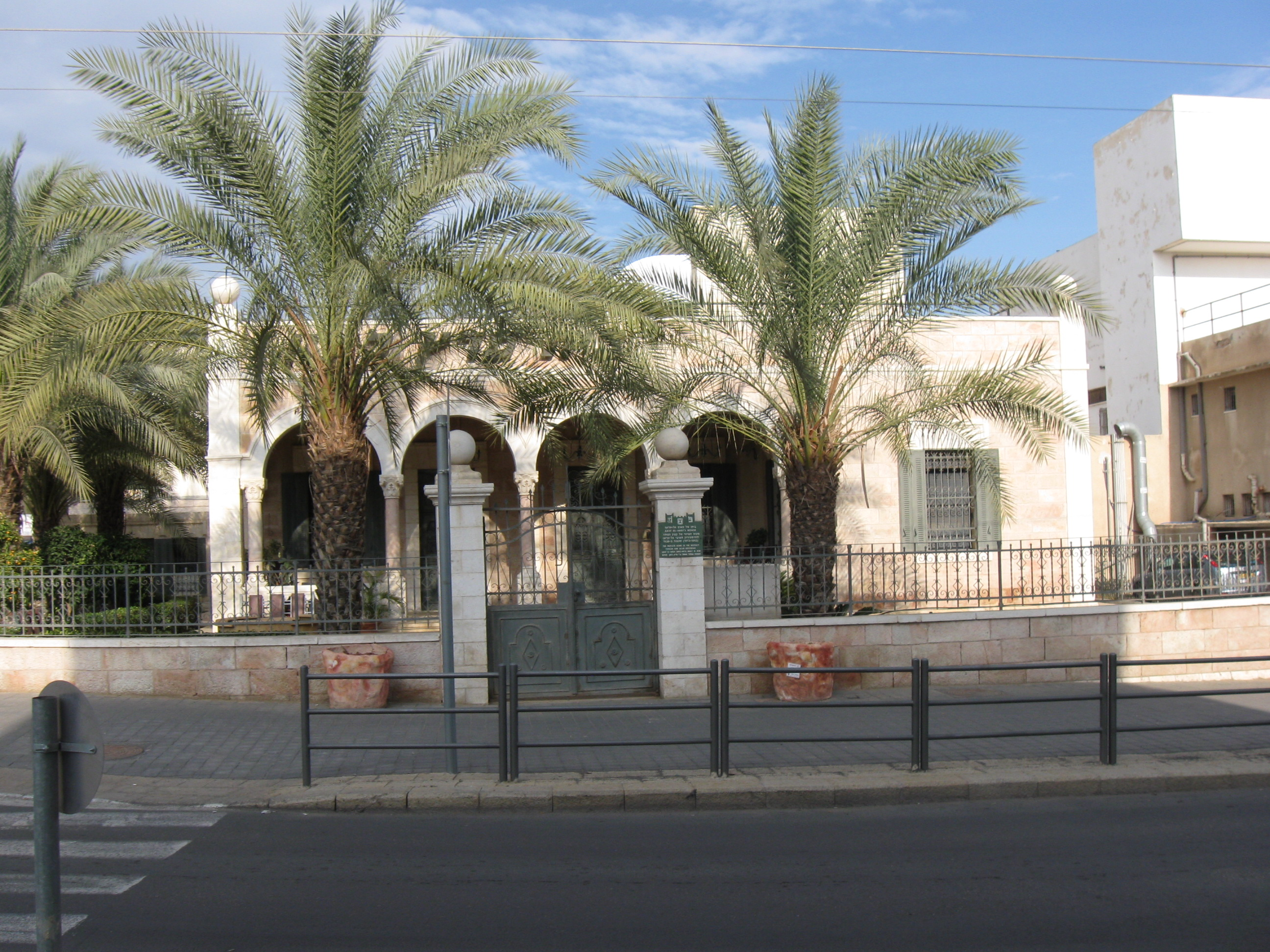
Restored mansion of Aref al-Aref

The Old City (Hebrew: העיר העתיקה, HaIr HaAtika) (Arabic: البلده القديمه (al balad alqafima) is the historical center of Beersheba. Based on the core of the old Ottoman-era built town, it was expanded by the British during the Mandate era. Street signs in English from the Mandate era are still visible on many street corners. Laid out in a grid pattern, it consists mostly of one- and two-floor stone buildings, although some taller buildings were recently built. The old Turkish buildings dating back about 100 years are mostly in a state of neglect although some exceptions can be found where private individuals or organizations have renovated them. Until the late 1990s, the Old City was the commercial hub of Beersheba. But since the opening of the large Negev Mall near the Central Bus Station (and a number of smaller neighborhood-malls) many of the leading chain stores have moved out. There are several sites of historical interest in the Old City: Abraham's Well, the Negev Museum of Art, Allenby Garden, Turkish Railway Station, British War Cemetery, and Aljama Mosque.

== Alef ==
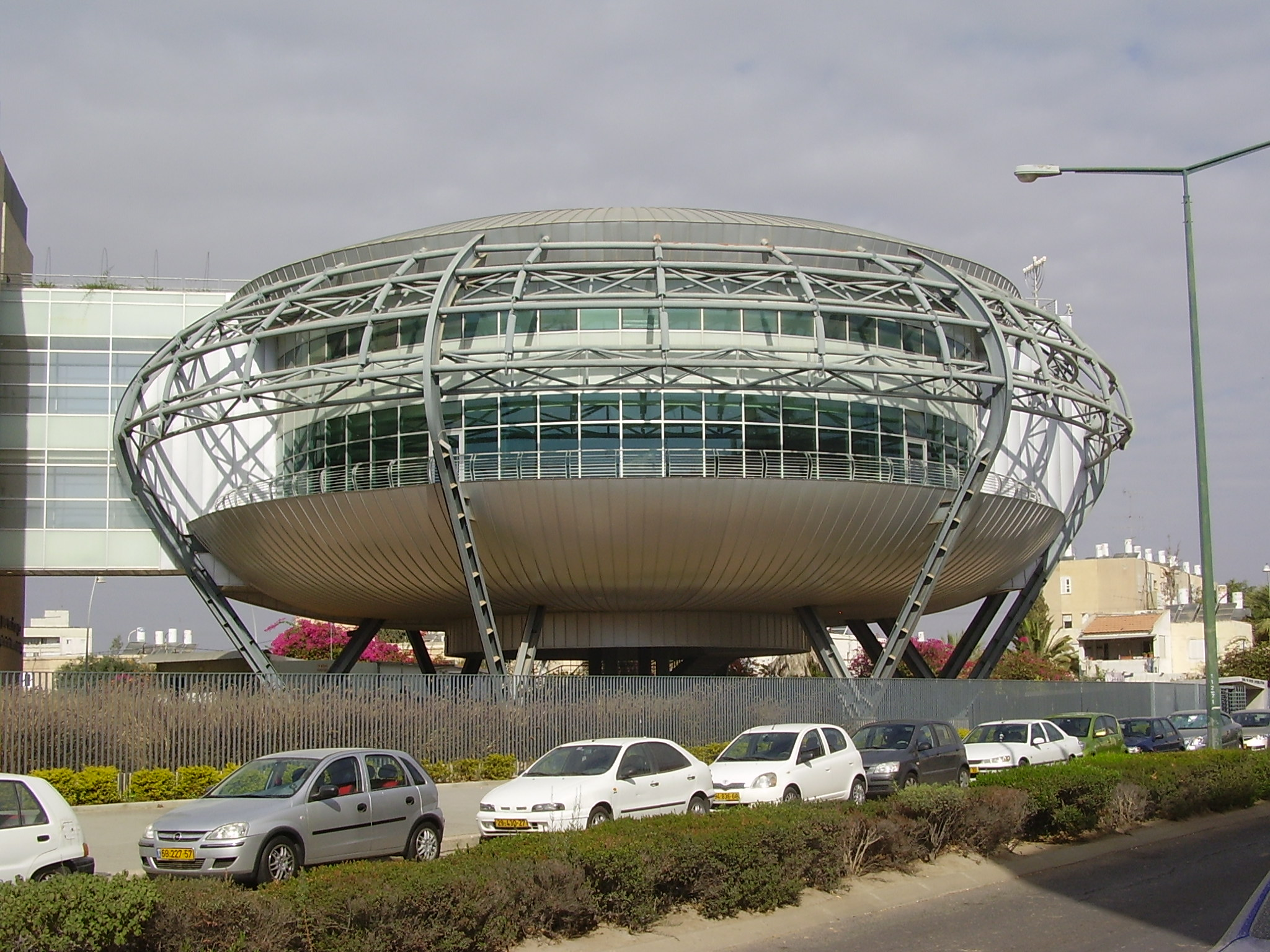
Shamoon College of Engineering

Alef (Hebrew: א, lit. A or 1) is located to the immediate north of the Old City. It was the first neighborhood built after Israeli independence (in the 1950s) and provided housing for immigrants from Morocco, Iraq, Yemen and India. Shechuna Alef consists of rows of semi-detached houses and a few apartment blocks.

== Bet ==
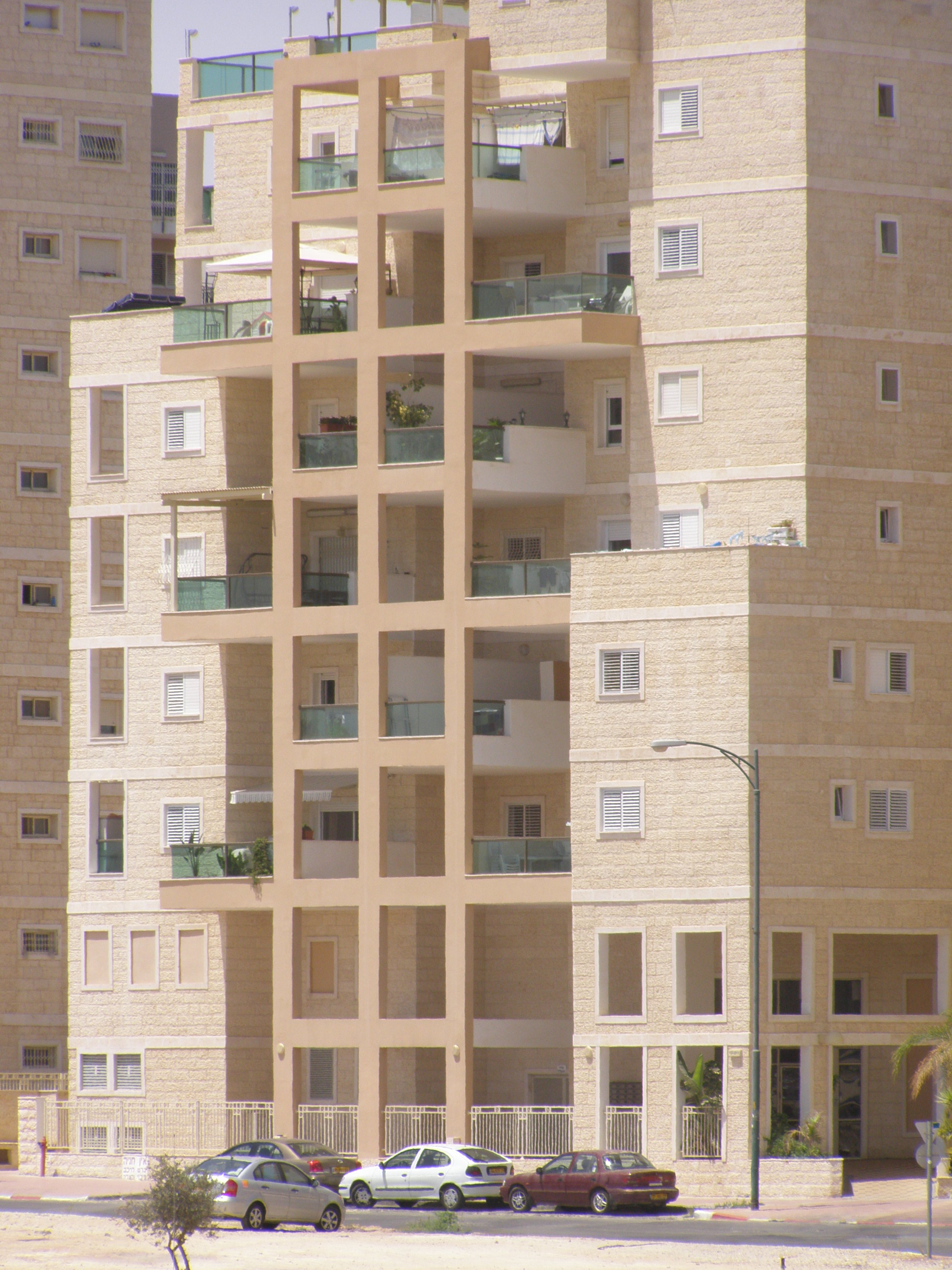
Ya'akov Cohen Street

Bet (Hebrew: ב, lit. B or 2) is located northwest of Alef. It was also built in the 1950s, and provided housing for immigrants from Poland, Egypt, and later Libya (1960s) Georgia and Russia (1970s). Shechuna Bet is home to the Vasermil Stadium, home of Hapoel Be'er Sheva, the city's major football club.

== Gimmel ==
Gimmel (Hebrew: ג, lit. G or 3, also known as Hashalom) is northeast of the Old City. Soroka Medical Center and Ben-Gurion University of the Negev are located here. Many students live in the neighborhood and the university dormitories are situated here. It consists largely of apartment blocks.

== Dalet ==
Dalet (Hebrew: ד, lit. D or 4)(Neighborhood 'D' or '4') is located north of Bet and west of Gimmel, south west to Ramot and northeast to Nahal Ashan. The neighborhood contains the Nurit immigrant integration camp,.The neighborhood holds the famous pyramid house. It has a large psychiatric hospital asylum, two small shopping centers (Gilat and Oren). Dalet is known as the most dangerous neighborhood in Beersheba with the most poverty. Consists of many unsolved murders and stories of haunted abandoned buildings. Mainly populated by Moroccans during the migration. This neighborhood is still one of the most dangerous places to live in Beersheba. Shechuna Dalet consists of rows of apartment blocks, (project like apartment structures) with underground bomb shelters. The neighborhood is still populated by the majority of families that came in the 1950's from Morocco, including Moroccan mob connections.

== Dalet Mizrah ==
The newest part of Dalet neighborhood (also known Vav haYeshana) where Ben Gurion University is located.

== Hei ==
Hei (Hebrew: ה, lit. H or 5) is located northwest of the Old City, and west of Alef and Bet. It houses the Ye'elim Absorption Center.

== Vav ==
Vav (Hebrew: ו, lit. V or 6) is located in the northwest of the city, north of Bet and west of Daled. It consists of a combination of apartment blocks and private homes, and has its own shopping mall (Kanyon Avia). The old Vav neighborhood, also known as Ringelblum, is popular with students due to its proximity to the university.

== Tet ==
Tet (Hebrew: ט, lit. T or 9) is located to the west of the Old City. It consists almost entirely of tower blocks.

== Yud Alef ==
Yud Alef (Hebrew: י"א, lit. JA 11) is located to the west of Tet. Most of the homes are detached or semi-detached. The neighborhood includes the Australian Soldier Park.

== Nahal Ashan ==
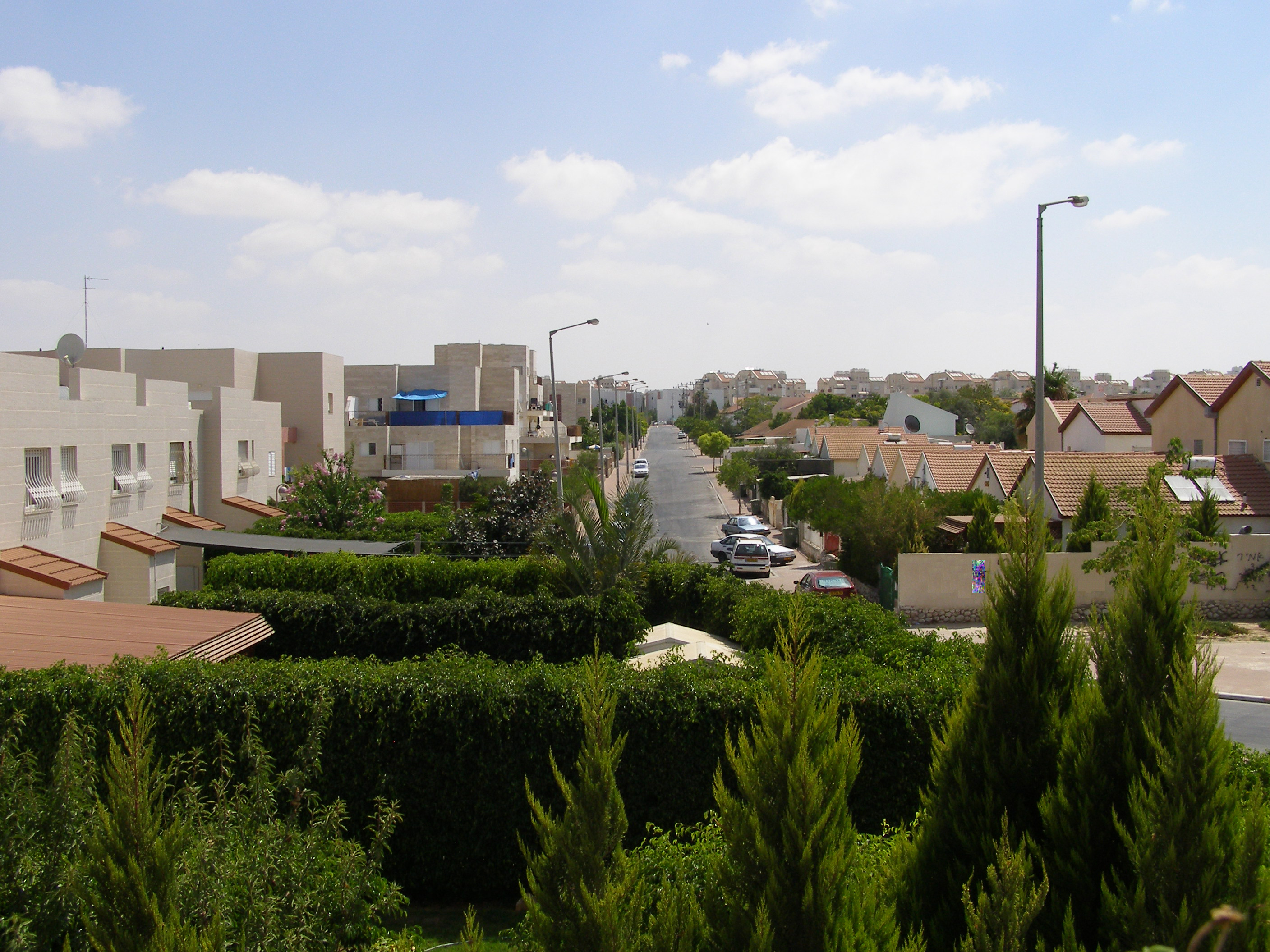
Leah Street, Nahal Ashan

Nahal Ashan (Hebrew: נחל עשן, Smoke River, Ashan River), also known as Neve Menachem (Hebrew: נווה מנחם, Menachem Oasis) is the westernmost neighborhood in Beersheba. It was built in the past decade and consists largely of private homes. The Neighberhood is built south west of the Ashan River (Nahal Ashan) and Ashan River is named after the biblical Ashan city in the Judea region.

== Nahal Beka ==
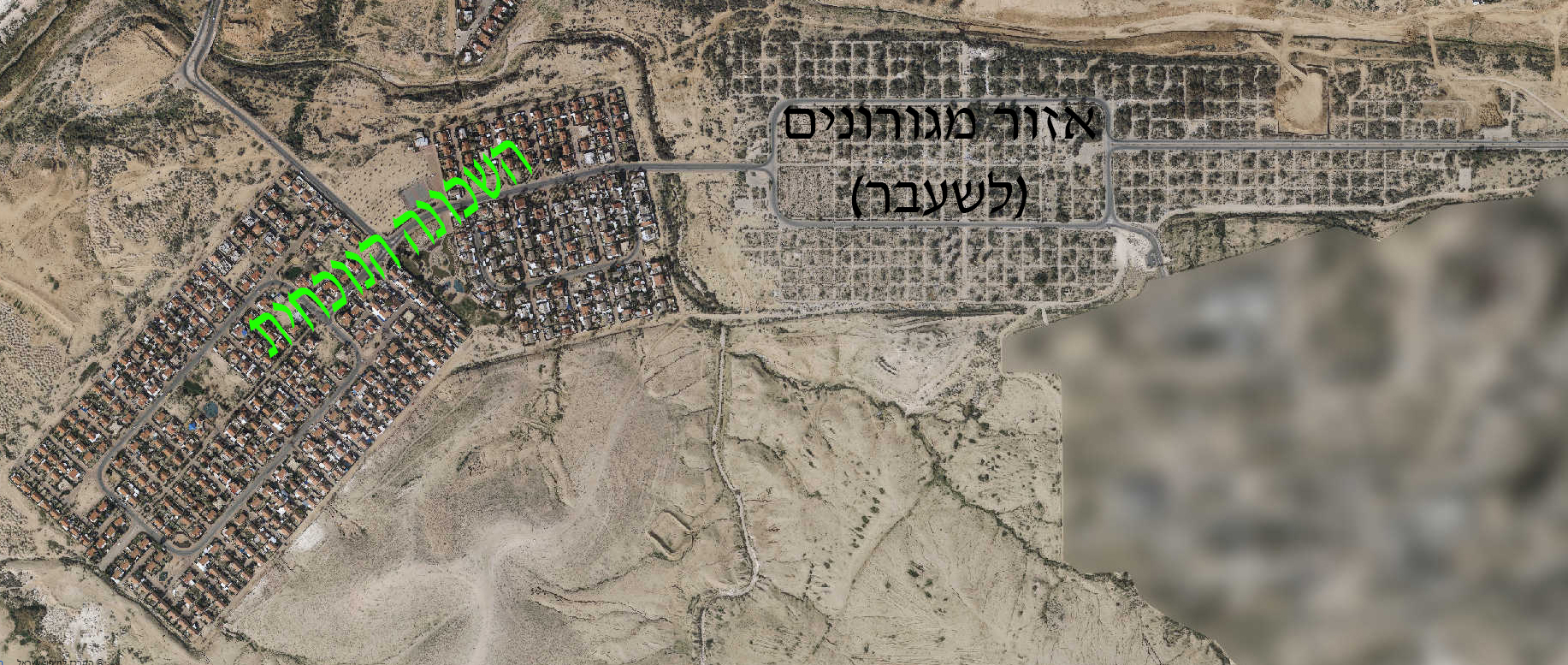
Aerial photo of the Nahal Beka neighborhood with watermark

Nahal Beka (Hebrew: נחל בקע, Valley Stream) is the city's southernmost neighborhood, located to the southwest of Neve Noy. Initially a whole site of caravans (portable buildings) was built in the 1991 for new immigrants from the former Soviet Union. Initially, during the 90s, the neighborhood and the immigrants had been led by the great Putski family and the chief Ilan (Ivan) Putski. Later, wealthier members of the Russian Jewish population had moved there and pushed for better services. Sports facilities had been built, and members of the community established the Center of Caucasus Immigrants.

American Jewish philanthropists had inaugurated a program in Nahal Beka to assist new immigrant youth from the Caucasus integrate in Israeli society. Youngsters aged 13–16 took part in a variety of after-school programs together with native-born Israelis that include field trips, leadership workshops and a summer camp.

In 1995 the temporary housing was evacuated and removed. The infrastructure is still largely there. Meanwhile, a neighborhood with single housing was built to the west, carrying the same name.

== Neot Lon ==
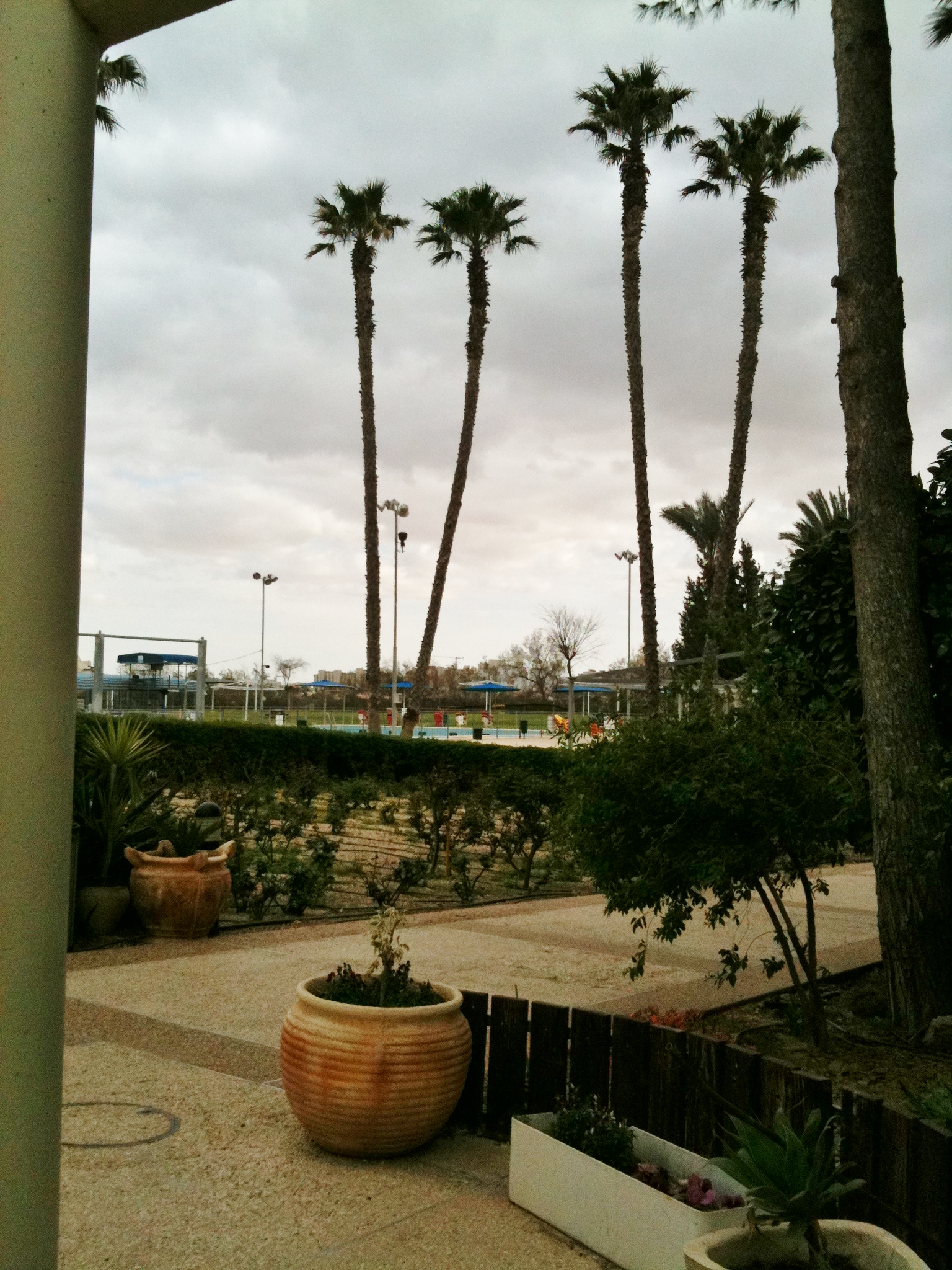
Beersheba Country Club

Neot Lon (Hebrew: נאות לון) is located in the west of the city, west of Tet. It is built around woodland and consists largely of detached and semi-detached houses. The neighborhood includes the Air Force technical high school and the Country Club.

== Neve Noy ==
Neve Noy (Hebrew: נווה נוי, lit. Beauty oasis) is located directly south of the Old City. It was founded in 1952 as an agricultural settlement consisting of small stone cottages with vegetable gardens, known as Mishkay Ezer (Hebrew: משקי עזר). The first residents were immigrants from Morocco and Tunisia who had been living in ma'abarot (transit camps). It was renamed Neve Noy in 1979, and consists largely of detached two-storey homes. Streets in this neighborhood are named after plants that grow in the Negev, such as Atad, Shita and Tzabar. Neve Noy is home to the second largest Karaite community in Israel, as well as Maccabi Be'er Sheva, Beersheba's second football team.

== Neve Ze'ev ==
Neve Ze'ev (Hebrew: נווה זאב) is located in the southwest of the city, south of Tet. It consists almost entirely of large tower blocks in an area carved out of the surrounding hillside. Many construction projects are under way.

== Ramot ==
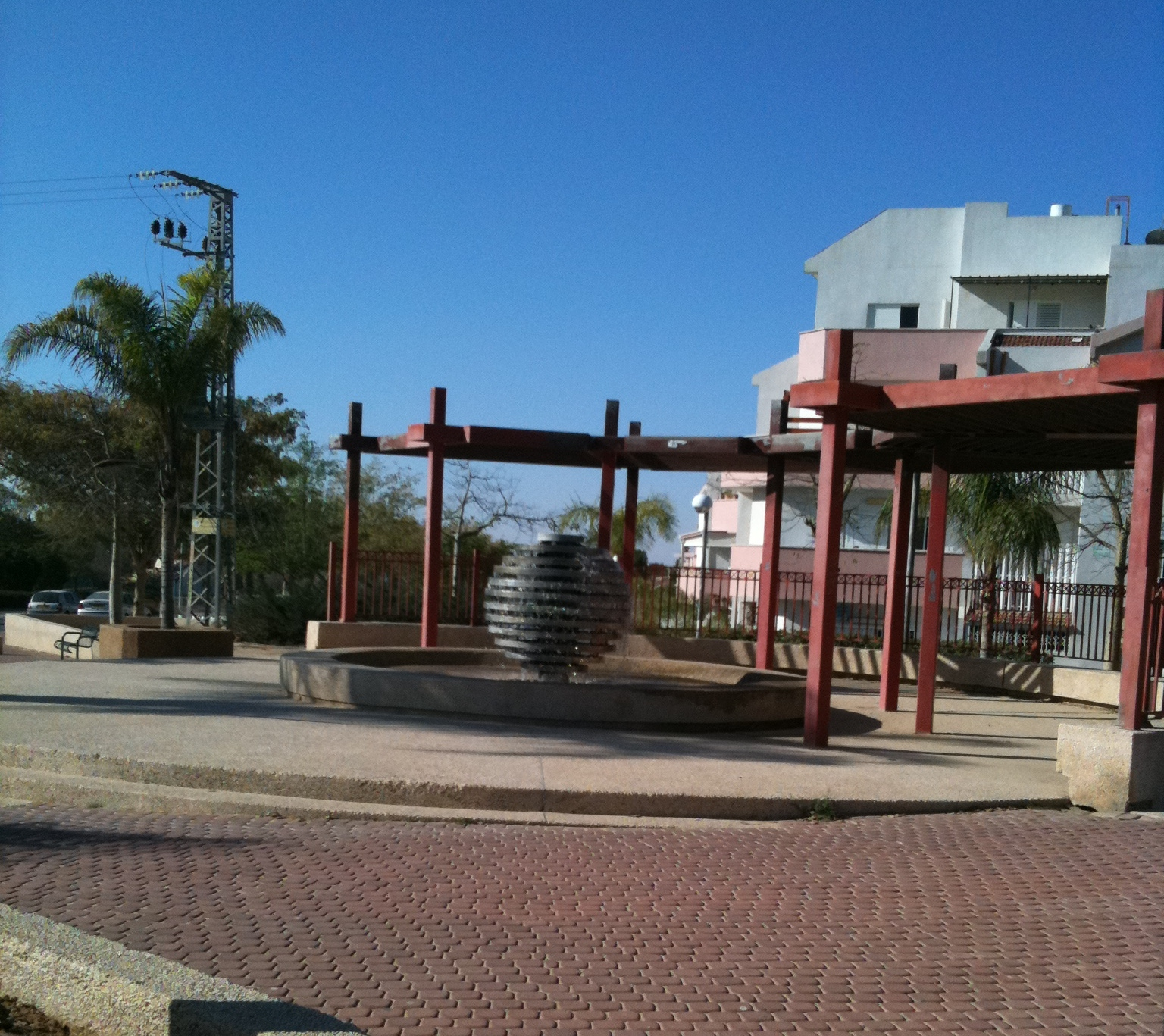
Bank Square, Ramot

Ramot (Hebrew: רמות, lit. Heights) is the northernmost and easternmost neighborhood in the city, located northern of Gimmel, and named for the fact that it is built on hills. It consists of a mixture of tower blocks and houses, and is still being expanded.
