= Kfar Shmaryahu =

Kfar Shmaryahu: כְּפַר שְׁמַרְיָהוּ; كفار شمرياهو
- Local council

Hebrew transcription(s)
  - ISO 259: Kpar Šmaryahu
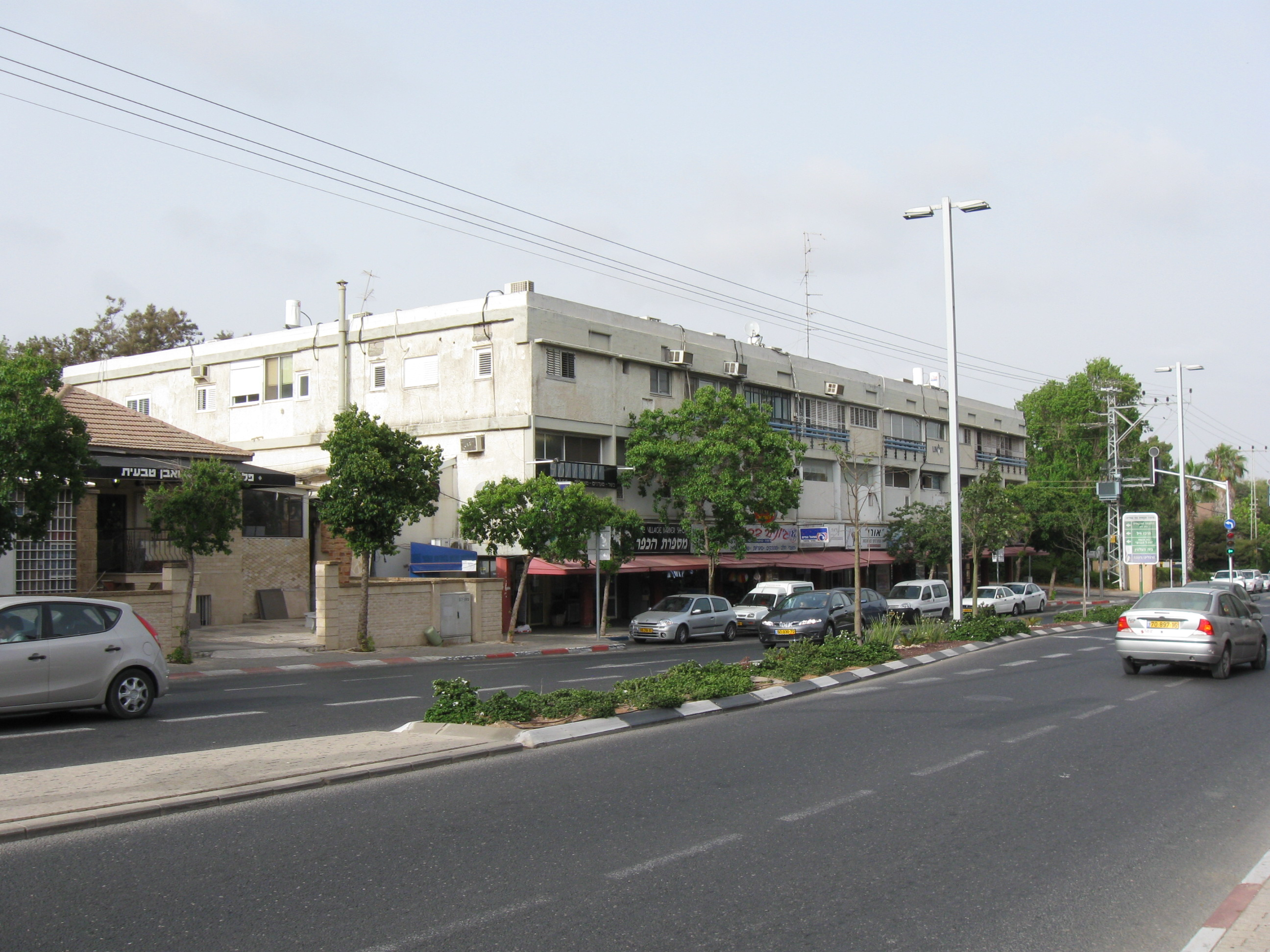

- Location within Israel Location within Central Israel
- Coordinates: 32°11′6″N 34°49′12″E
- Country: Israel
- District: Tel Aviv
- Natural Region: Tel Aviv
- Founded: 1937

Government
  - Head of Municipality: Serge Korchia

Area
  - Total: 2,570 dunams (2.57 km^{2}; 0.99 sq mi)

Population (2024)
  - Total: 1,981
  - Density: 771/km^{2} (2,000/sq mi)

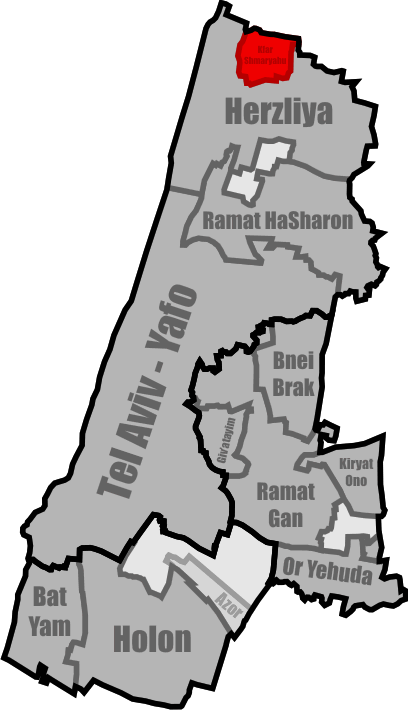
Location of Kfar Shmaryahu in the Tel Aviv District

Kfar Shmaryahu (Hebrew: כְּפַר שְׁמַרְיָהוּ, Arabic: كفار شمرياهو) is a local council in Israel, within the Tel Aviv District.

== History ==
Kfar Shmaryahu was founded in May 1937, during the Fifth Aliyah. The founding members were German-Jewish immigrants, who named the village after Shmaryahu Levin (1867–1935), a Russian-born Jewish Zionist leader. The village was founded as an agricultural community, with forty farms, thirty auxiliary farms, and twenty lots for housing projects. A well was drilled, and a synagogue that became the center of community life was also built. In late 1938, 60 families were living there, and the predominant language was German. Throughout the following years the town absorbed new immigrants. In 1950 it was declared a local council and was granted additional land.

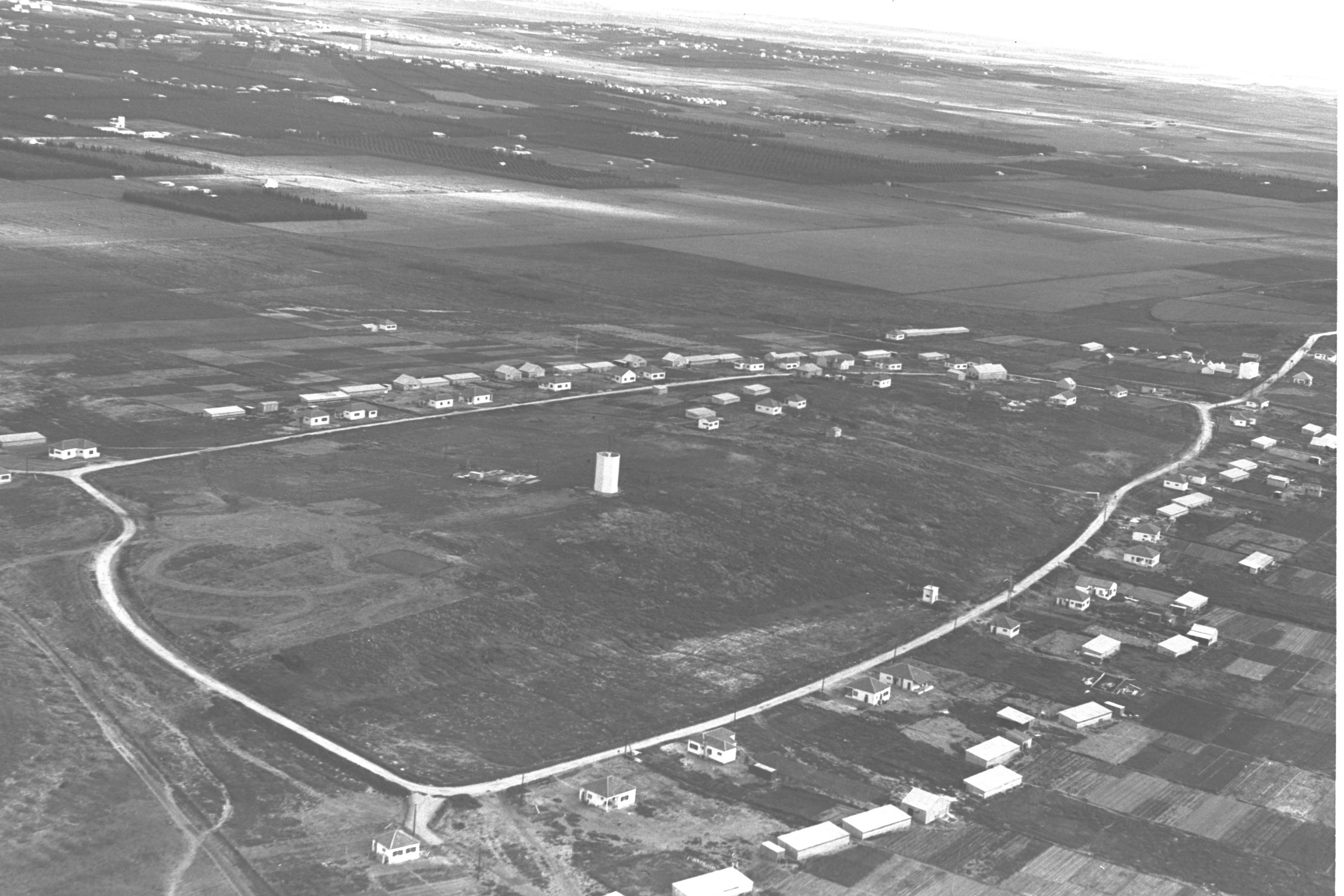
Kfar Shmaryhu 1938

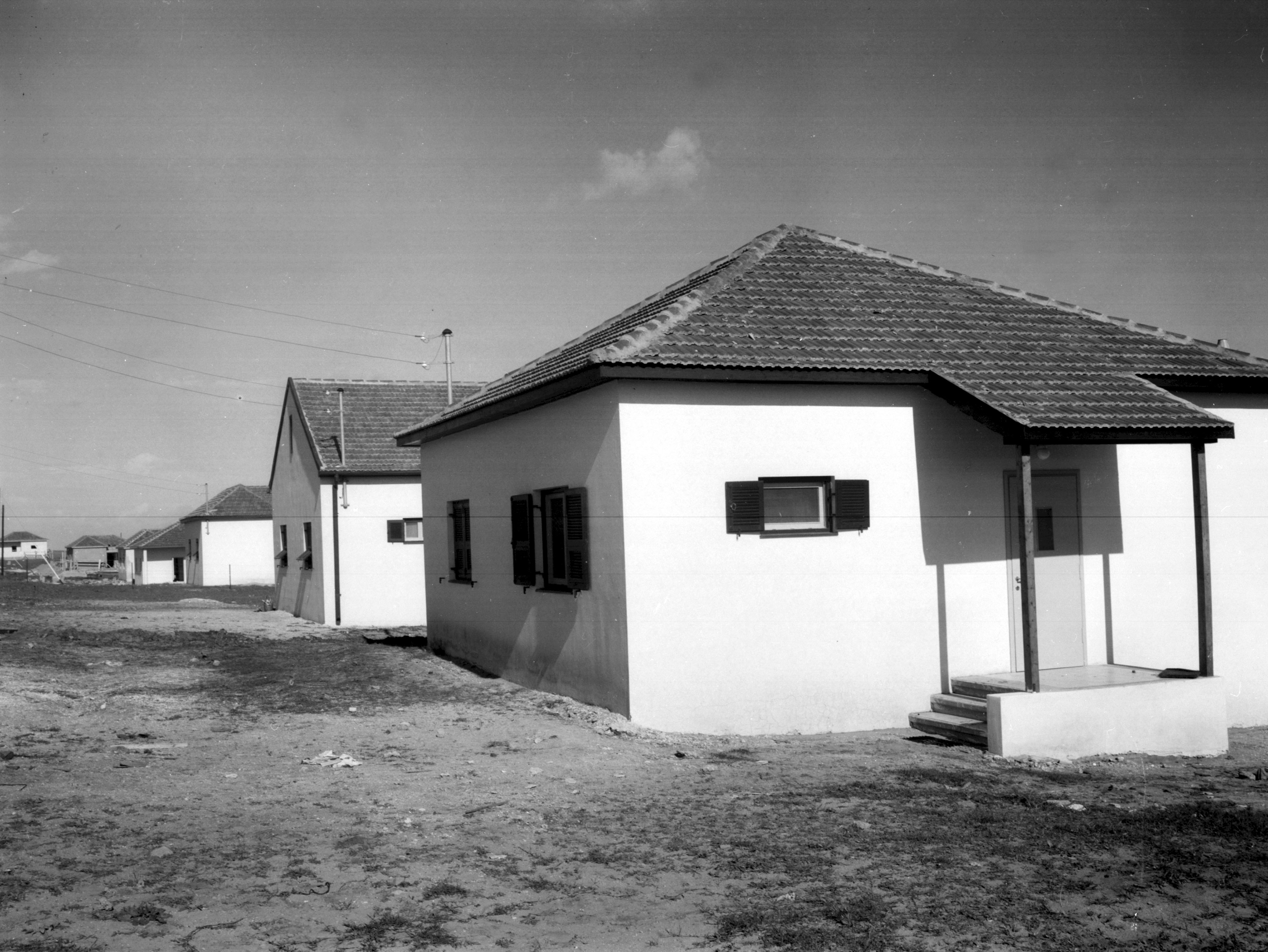
Kfar Shmaryahu in December 1937

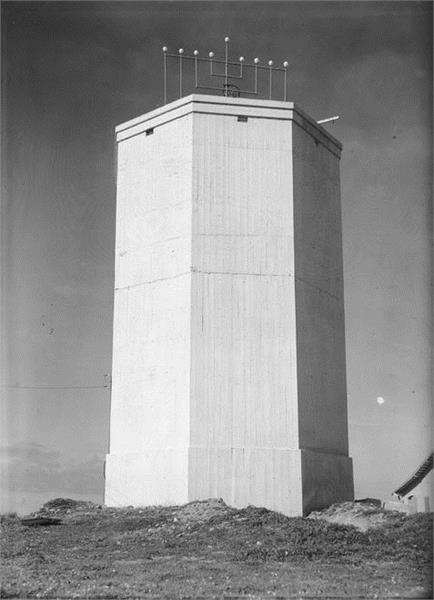
Kfar Shmaryahu water tower 1940

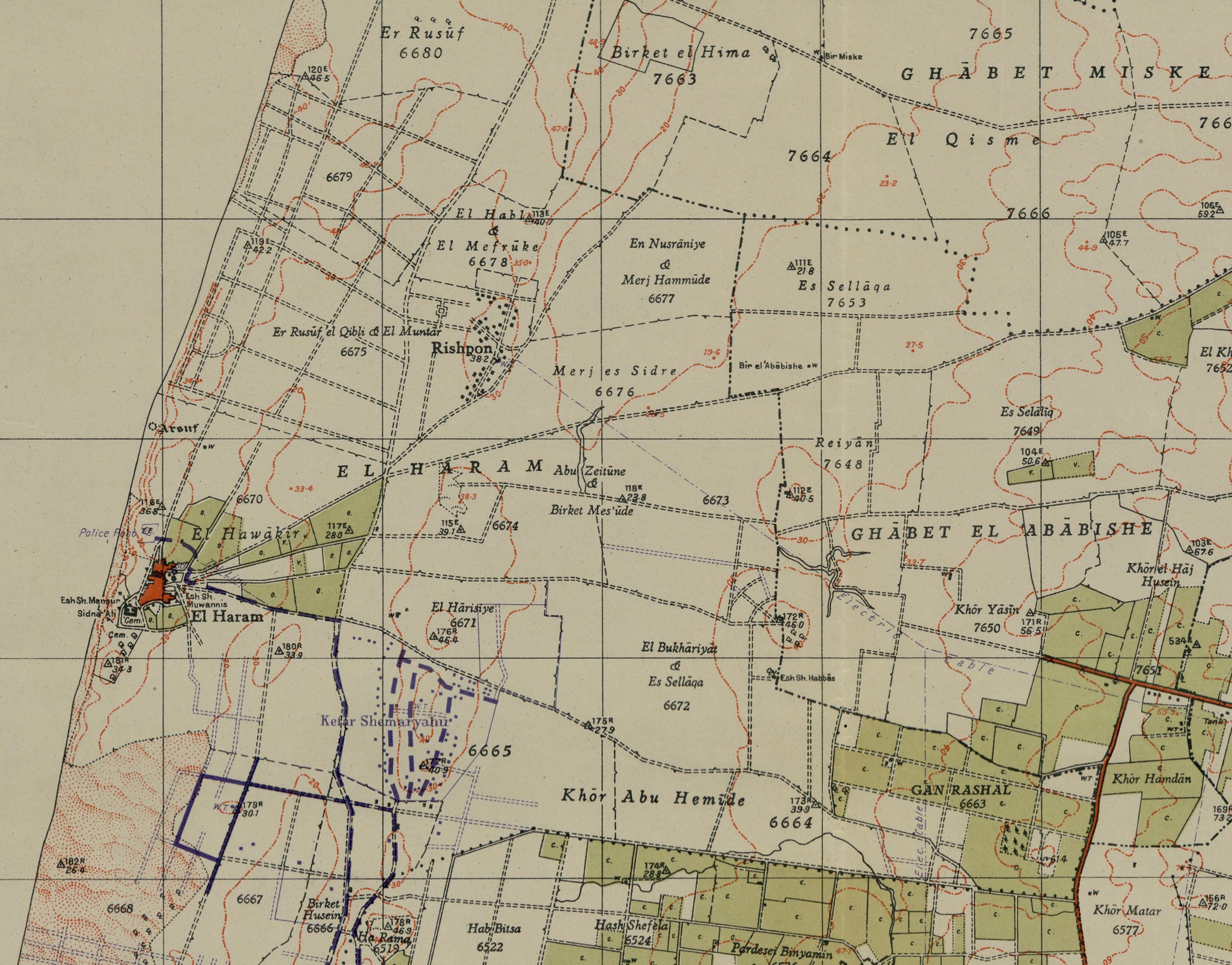
Kfar Shmaryahu 1942 1:20,000

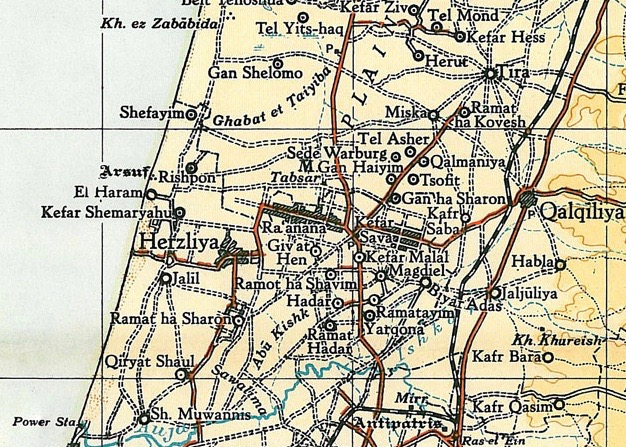
Kfar Shmaryhu 1945 1:250,000

== Status ==
Kfar Shmaryahu is an affluent suburb of Tel Aviv. It is ranked very highly on the Israeli socio-economic scale (10 out of 10). According to Yedioth Ahronoth, Kfar Shmaryahu's municipality annually spends NIS 8,700 per resident, a figure higher than Tel Aviv and over twice as high as Jerusalem.

In 2024 it had a population of 1,981.

== Notable residents ==
- Shai Agassi
- Shulamit Aloni (1928–2014), civil-rights politician and left-wing activist
- Aki Avni
- Uri Davis, academic and civil rights activist
- Ilanit
- Sapir Koffmann, Miss Israel 1984
- Hillel Kook
- Daphni Leef, activist and video editor
- Ari Shavit, author, journalist
- Miriam Siderenski, Olympic runner
- Stef Wertheimer
