= Azor =

Azor: אָזוֹר; أزور
- Local council (from 1951)

Hebrew transcription(s)
  - ISO 259: ʔazor
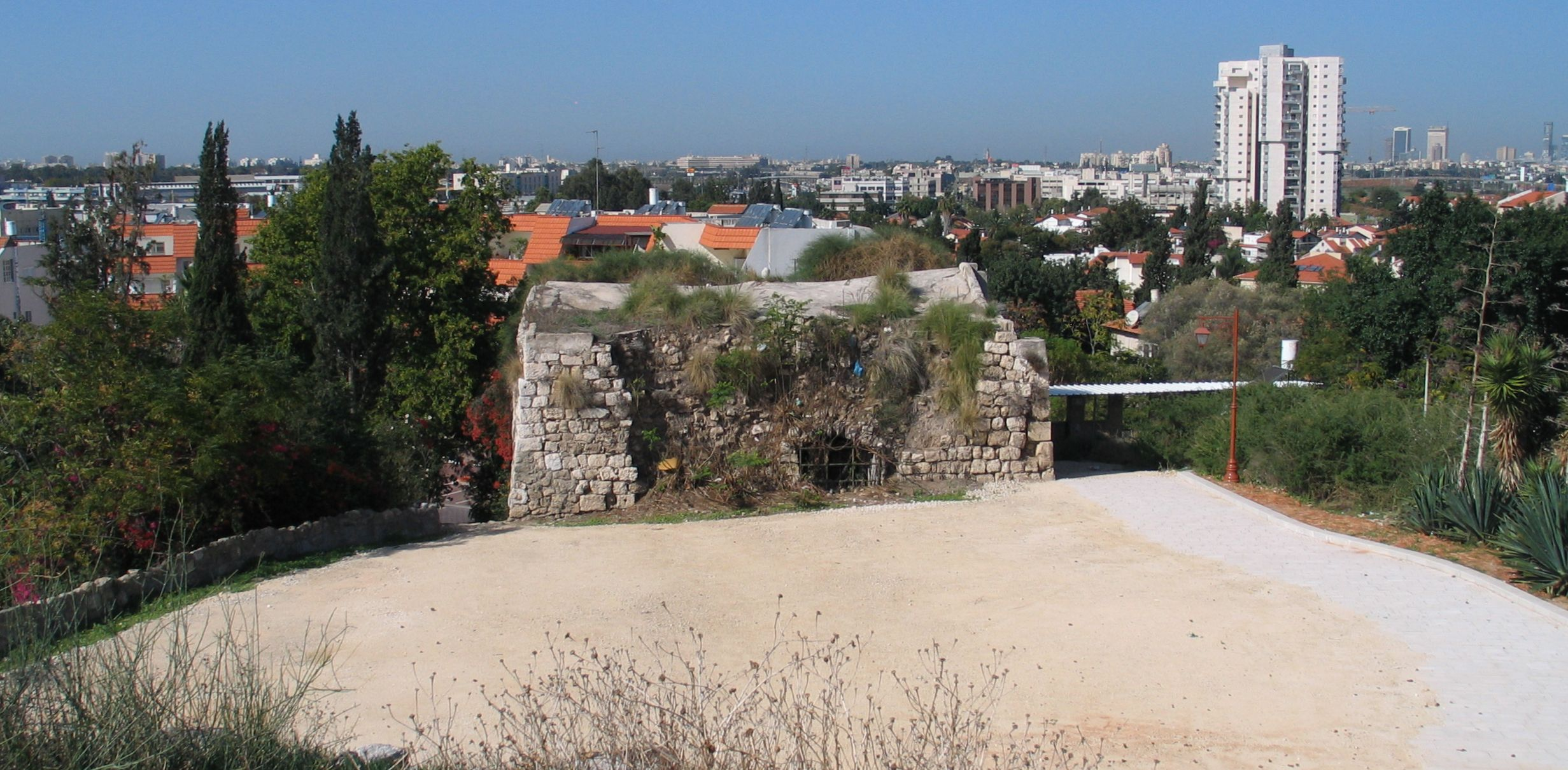

- Location within Central Israel Location within Israel
- Coordinates: 32°1′20.03″N 34°48′40.47″E
- Country: Israel
- District: Tel Aviv
- Natural Region: Holon
- Founded: 1948

Government
  - Head of Municipality: Arie Pechter

Area
  - Total: 2,415 dunams (2.415 km^{2}; 0.932 sq mi)

Population (2024)
  - Total: 13,067
  - Density: 5,411/km^{2} (14,010/sq mi)
- Website: www.azor.muni.il

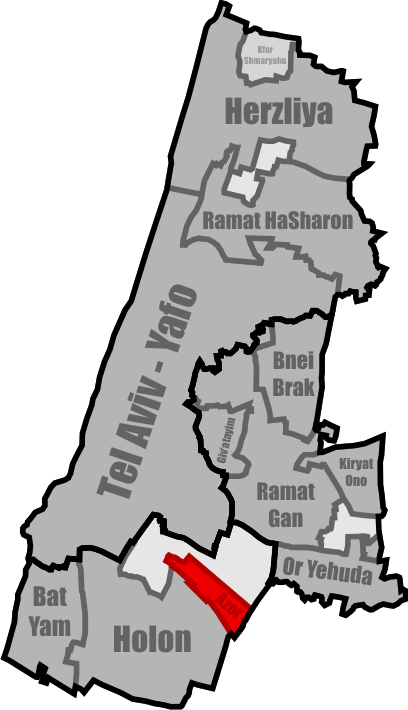
Location of Azor in the Tel Aviv District

Azor (Hebrew: אָזוֹר) is a local council in the Tel Aviv District of Israel, on the old Jaffa-Jerusalem road southeast of Tel Aviv. Established in 1948, Azor was granted local council status in 1951. In 2024 it had a population of 13,067, and has a jurisdiction of 2,415 dunams (2.415 km^{2}; 0.932 sq mi).

== Etymology ==
The earliest occurrence of the name is Babylonian A-zu-ru (in a Neo-Assyrian text from 701 B.C.E.) which is compatible with the Septuagint form Άζωρ (Joshua 19:45). According to scholars, the name may derive from Semitic root ’-Z-R “to gird, encompass, equip”, but "this derivation is highly hypothetical as this root is so far not productive in the toponymy."

The council of the new village named it Mishmar HaShiv'a ('Guardian of the Seven') in honour of seven Israelis soldiers killed near there in 1948, but the government committee in charge of assigning names forced them to change it to Azor on the grounds that preserving Biblical names was more important. However, another new village nearby was later named Mishmar HaShiv'a.

== History ==
The tel of the ancient city is situated in the northern part of modern Azor.

the 16th century, Haseki sultan endowed the lands of Azor to its Jerusalem soup kitchen. During the 18th and 19th centuries, the area belonged to the Nahiyeh (sub-district) of Lod that encompassed the area of the present-day city of Modi'in-Maccabim-Re'ut in the south to the present-day city of El'ad in the north, and from the foothills in the east, through the Lod Valley to the outskirts of Jaffa in the west. This area was home to thousands of inhabitants in about 20 villages, who had at their disposal tens of thousands of hectares of prime agricultural land.

== Demographics ==
Historical population
Year	Pop.	±%
1972	4,600	—
1983	6,600	+43.5%
1995	8,600	+30.3%
2008	10,600	+23.3%
2022	13,191	+24.4%
2024	13,067	−0.9%

== Voting Patterns ==
In the 2022 election, 58 percent of voters in Azor voted for the parties of the right-wing coalition led by Benjamin Netanyahu, while 40 percent voted for the parties of the center-left coalition led by Yair Lapid and 0.1 percent voted for the Arab parties.

In the 2026 election, 53 percent of voters in Azor voted for the parties of the right-wing coalition led by Benjamin Netanyahu, while 40 percent voted for the parties of the center-left coalition led by Gadi Eisenkot and 0.3 percent voted for the Arab parties. An additional 4.2 percent voted for the Reservists, and 1.9 percent voted for Amcha Yisrael. Voter turnout increased 7 percent from the 2022 election.

== Notable residents ==
- Shelly Krolitzky (born 1999), tennis player
- Matvey Natanzon, backgammon player
- Margalit Tzan'ani, singer and tv personality
- Branu Tegene, Israeli journalist

== Main sights ==
- Azor Museum, archaeological museum
