= Jadeidi-Makr =

Local council in Northern Israel

Judeida - al-Makr: جديدة - المكر; גֻ'דֵידָה-מַכְּר
- Local council (from 1990)

Hebrew transcription(s)
  - ISO 259: Ǧudéida - Makkr
  - Also spelled: Judeidi-Maker (official); Makr-Jadeidi (unofficial)
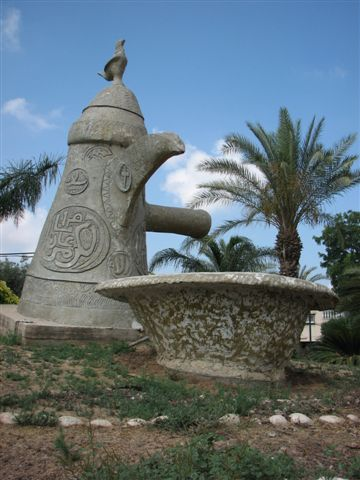
- Entrance to Jadeidi-Makr

- Location within Northwest Israel Location within Israel
- Coordinates: 32°56′00″N 35°8′29″E
- Grid position: 163/259 PAL
- Country: Israel
- District: Northern
- Subdistrict: Acre
- Natural Region: Akko

Area
  - Total: 8,974 dunams (8.974 km^{2}; 3.465 sq mi)

Population (2024)
  - Total: 20,231
  - Density: 2,254/km^{2} (5,839/sq mi)
- Name meaning: El Judeiyideh, the dyke, or coloured streak in the mountain side el Mekr, from personal name

Judeida - al-Makr or Jadeidi-Makr (Hebrew: גֻ'דֵידָה-מַכְּר; Arabic: جديدة - المكر) is an Arab local council formed by the merger of the two Arab towns of al-Makr and Judeida in 1990. It is located a few kilometers east of the city of Acre in the Northern District, Israel.

In 2024 its population was 20,231.

== History ==
A flat bronze chandelier, featuring twelve candle holes, was found in Makr. It features an Aramaic inscription along its entire circumference, as well as depictions of two menorahs, lulavs, and shofars, indicating a Jewish context. The text references Kfar Hananya, suggesting that the chandelier belongs to an ancient synagogue that was located there. It is today in the Musée royal de Mariemont, Morlanwelz, Belgium.

=== Crusaders ===
Arabic documents referring to the hudna (truce agreement) of 1283 between the Crusaders based in Acre and the Mamluk sultan al-Mansur Qalawun are mentioning "Makr Harsin" and "al-Hudeidah", as part of the domain of the Crusaders, where "al-Hudeidah" represents modern Jadeidi. "Makr Harsin" is either the original name of Makr, or, alternatively, it is possible that the text refers to two separate locations, Makr and Harsin, the latter remaining unidentified.

=== Ottoman Empire ===
Incorporated into the Ottoman Empire in 1517, Makr appeared in the census of 1596, located in the nahiya (subdistrict) of Acre, part of Safad Sanjak. The population was 22 households and 3 bachelors, all Muslim. They paid taxes on wheat, barley, summer crops, fruit trees, cotton, occasional revenues, goats and beehives; a total of 17,000 akçe. A map by Pierre Jacotin from Napoleon's invasion of 1799 showed both places, named as "Makr" and "Sedid".

In 1875 Victor Guérin visited Makr, and found it to have 350 inhabitants, half Muslim and half "Schismatic Greek". He further noted that "In and about El Mekr are broken columns, the fragment of an ancient bas-relief, a little sarcophagus in terra cotta, and several sepulchral caves." He found Jadeidi to have 350 inhabitants.

In 1881, the PEF's Survey of Western Palestine (SWP) described Jadeidi as "a village, built of stone, containing about eighty Moslems and twenty Christians, surrounded by olives and arable land, situated near the plain, .....with many cisterns for rain water to drink from." Makr was described as "a village, built of stone, containing 100 Moslems and eighty Christians, situated at the edge of the plain, surrounded by olives and arable land; there are many cisterns for rain-water in the village."

A population list from about 1887 showed that Jadeidi had about 245 inhabitants; half Muslim and half Greek Christians, while Makr had 280 inhabitants; one third Catholic and Greek Christians, two thirds Muslim.

=== British Mandate ===
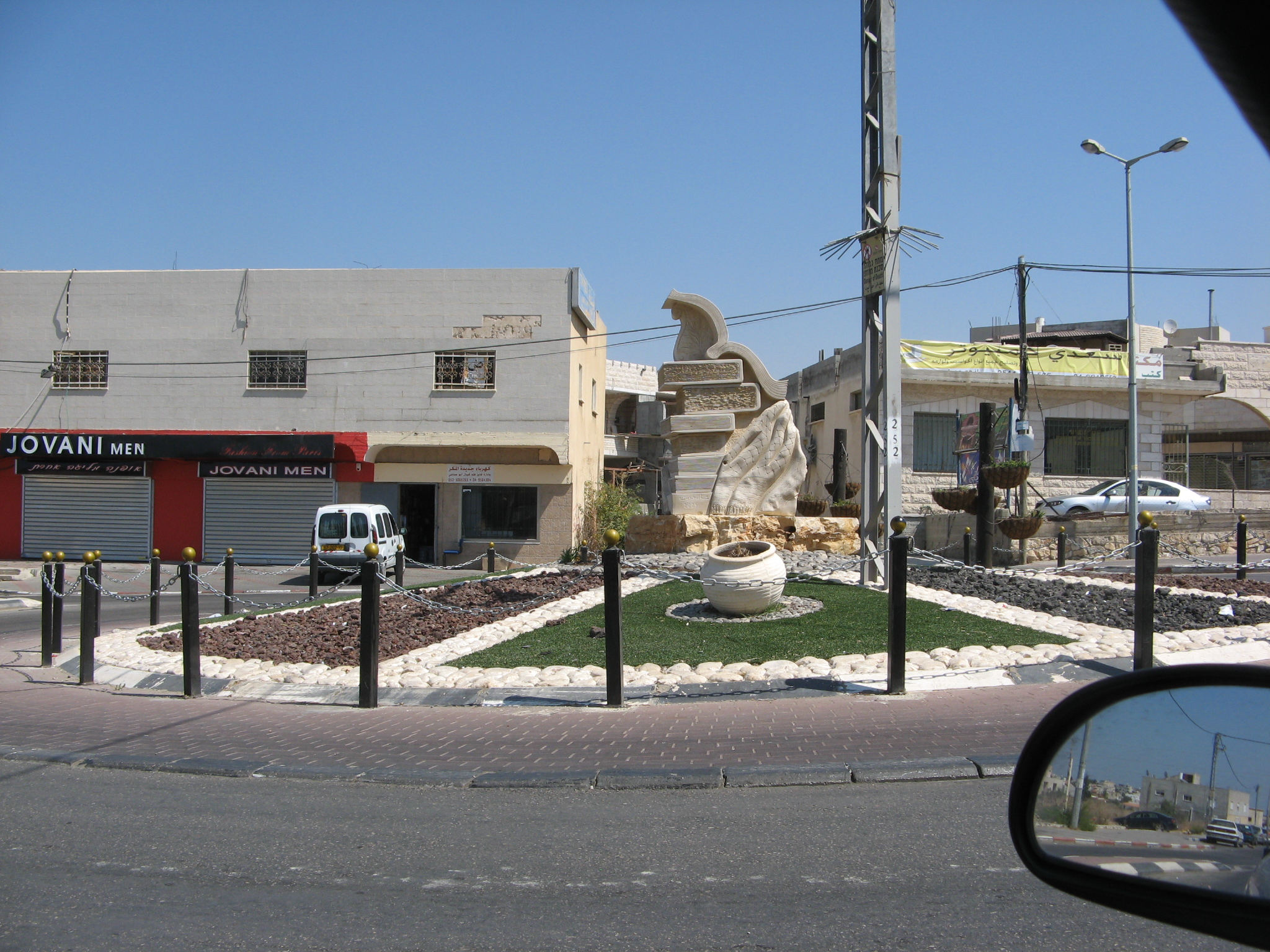
Statue in Jadeidi-Makr

In the 1922 census of Palestine conducted by the British Mandate authorities Jadeidi had a population of 204 residents; 108 Muslims and 96 Christians. Of the Christians, 51 were Orthodox and 45 Greek Catholic (Melchite). Al Makr had a population of 281; 206 Muslims and 75 Christians. Of the Christians, 30 were Orthodox and 45 Greek Catholic (Melchite). In the 1931 census, Jadeidi had a population of 249; 146 Muslims and 103 Christians, in a total of 57 houses, while Makr had a population of 331; 257 Muslims and 74 Christians, in a total of 77 houses.

In the 1945 statistics the population of Jadeidi was 280; 150 Muslims and 130 Christians, who owned 5,219 dunams of land according to an official land and population survey. 1,855 dunams were plantations and irrigable land, 2,202 dunams were used for cereals, while 39 dunams were built-up (urban) land.

The same year the population of Makr was 490; 390 Muslims and 100 Christians, while 8,791 dunams of land belonged to the village according to the same official land and population survey. 96 dunams were for citrus and bananas, 730 for plantations and irrigable land, 7,241 used for cereals, while 26 dunams were built-up (urban) land.

=== Israel ===
Makr was captured by the Israeli army during the first part of Operation Dekel, 8–14 July 1948, and remained under Martial Law until 1966. Mahmoud Darwish's family, who originated from the destroyed Arab village of al-Birwa, live in the town and Darwish was educated and raised there.

== Demographics ==
Historical population
Year	Pop.	±%
1995	12,500	—
2008	18,000	+44.0%
2022	19,842	+10.2%
2024	20,232	+2.0%

== Sports ==
The town's main football team, Hapoel Bnei Jadeidi F.C., played in the Israeli Liga Gimel (Israeli Fifth Division) in 2011-2012.

== Transportation ==
In 2017, Israel Railways proposed building an additional train station at Jadeidi-Makr on the Railway to Karmiel, although the dates for construction were not set.

== Voting Patterns ==
In the 2022 election, 96 percent of voters in Jadeide-Makr voted for the Arab parties, while 2 percent voted for the parties of the center-left coalition led by Yair Lapid and 1 percent voted for the parties of the right-wing coalition led by Benjamin Netanyahu. Among the voters for the Arab parties, 44 percent voted for the Hadash–Ta'al list, while 33 percent voted for Balad and 23 percent voted for Ra'am.

In the 2026 election, 97 percent of voters in Jadeide-Makr voted for the Arab parties, while 2 percent voted for the parties of the center-left coalition led by Gadi Eisenkot and 0.4 percent voted for the parties of the right-wing coalition led by Benjamin Netanyahu. Among the voters for the Arab parties, 80 percent voted for the Joint List, while 20 percent voted for Ra'am. Voter turnout increased 56 percent from the 2022 election.

== Notable people ==
- Beram Kayal (born 1988), Israeli professional footballer

== See also ==
- Arab localities in Israel

== Bibliography ==
- Barag, Dan (1979). "A new source concerning the ultimate borders of the Latin Kingdom of Jerusalem". Israel Exploration Journal. 29: 197–217.
- Barron, J.B., ed. (1923). Palestine: Report and General Abstracts of the Census of 1922. Government of Palestine.
- Conder, C.R.; Kitchener, H.H. (1881). The Survey of Western Palestine: Memoirs of the Topography, Orography, Hydrography, and Archaeology. Vol. 1. London: Committee of the Palestine Exploration Fund.
- Dauphin, C. (1998). La Palestine byzantine, Peuplement et Populations. BAR International Series 726 (in French). Vol. III : Catalogue. Oxford: Archeopress. ISBN 0-860549-05-4.
- Department of Statistics (1945). Village Statistics, April, 1945. Government of Palestine.
- Guérin, V. (1880). Description Géographique Historique et Archéologique de la Palestine (in French). Vol. 3: Galilee, pt. 2. Paris: L'Imprimerie Nationale.
- Hadawi, S. (1970). Village Statistics of 1945: A Classification of Land and Area ownership in Palestine. Palestine Liberation Organization Research Center.
- Hütteroth, W.-D.; Abdulfattah, K. (1977). Historical Geography of Palestine, Transjordan and Southern Syria in the Late 16th Century. Erlanger Geographische Arbeiten, Sonderband 5. Erlangen, Germany: Vorstand der Fränkischen Geographischen Gesellschaft. ISBN 3-920405-41-2.
- Karmon, Y. (1960). "An Analysis of Jacotin's Map of Palestine" (PDF). Israel Exploration Journal. 10 (3, 4): 155–173, 244–253. Archived from the original (PDF) on 2019-12-22.
- Lerer, Yoav (2009-05-06). "El-Judeida Final Archive Report" (121). Hadashot Arkheologiyot – Excavations and Surveys in Israel.
- Mills, E., ed. (1932). Census of Palestine 1931. Population of Villages, Towns and Administrative Areas. Jerusalem: Government of Palestine.
- Morris, B. (1987). The Birth of the Palestinian refugee problem, 1947-1949. Cambridge University Press. ISBN 0-521-33028-9.
- Palmer, E.H. (1881). The Survey of Western Palestine: Arabic and English Name Lists Collected During the Survey by Lieutenants Conder and Kitchener, R. E. Transliterated and Explained by E.H. Palmer. Committee of the Palestine Exploration Fund.
- Rhode, H. (1979). Administration and Population of the Sancak of Safed in the Sixteenth Century. Columbia University. Archived from the original on 2020-03-01.
- Schumacher, G. (1888). "Population list of the Liwa of Akka". Quarterly Statement - Palestine Exploration Fund. 20: 169–191.
