= Kiryat Ono =

Kiryat Ono קִרְיַת אוֹנוֹ
- City (from 1992)

Hebrew transcription(s)
  - ISO 259: Qiryat ʔono
  - Also spelled: Qiryat Ono (official)
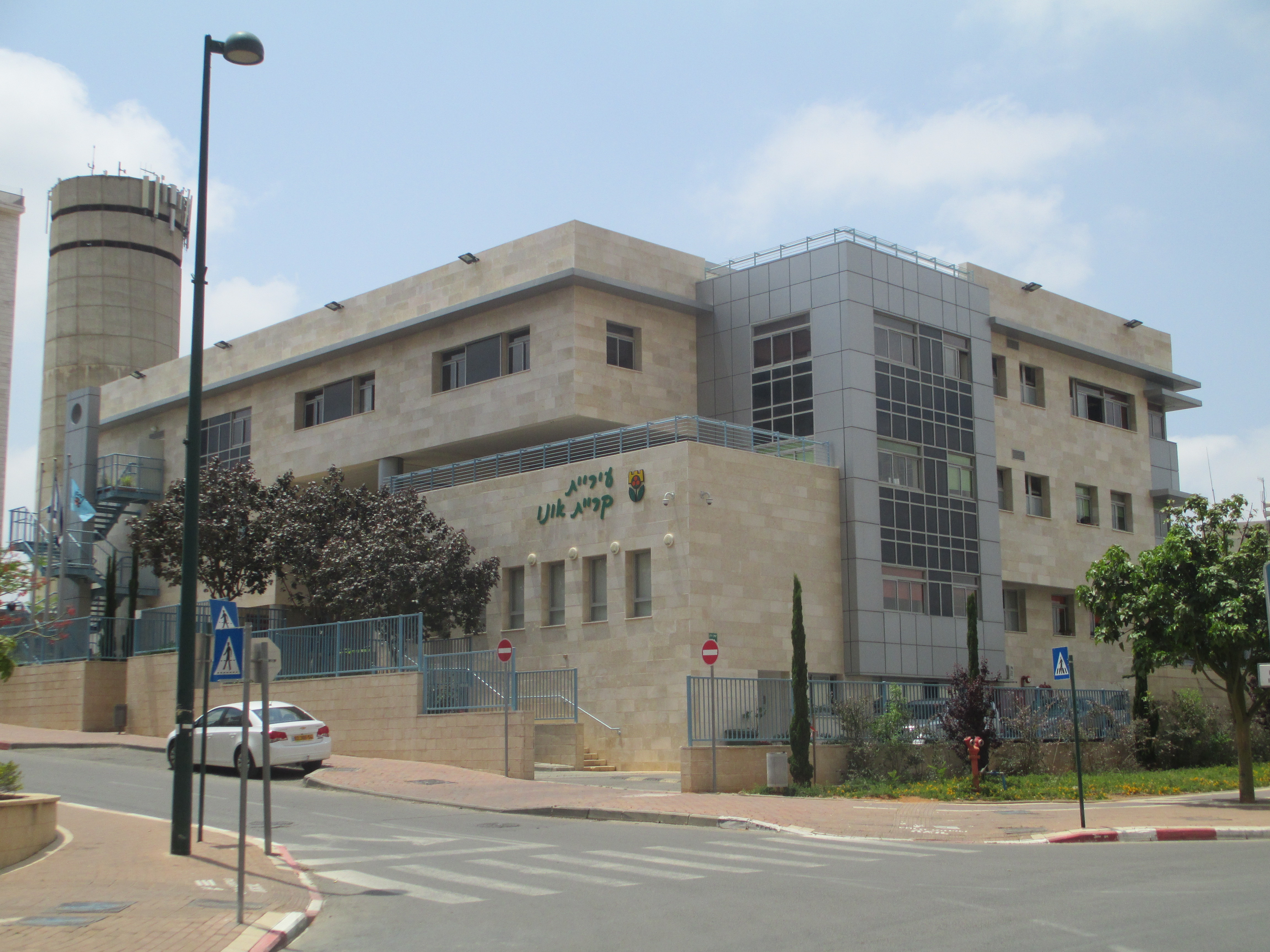
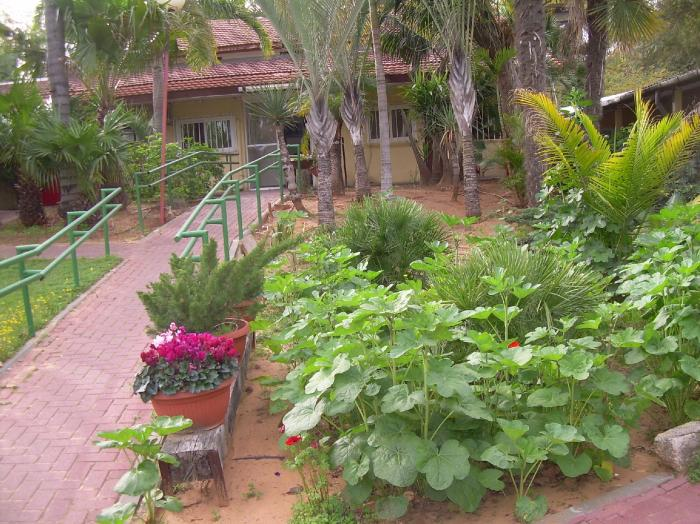
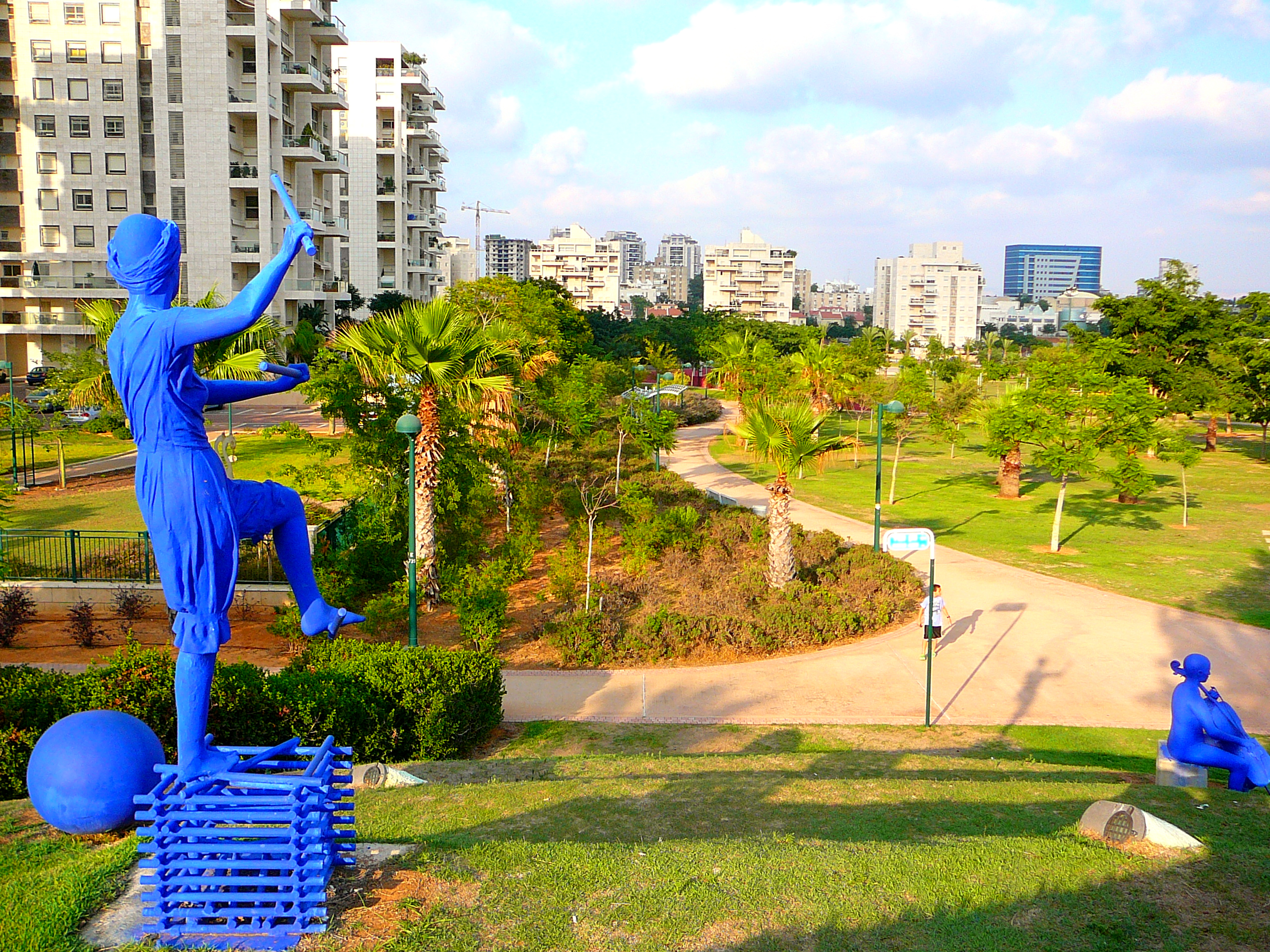
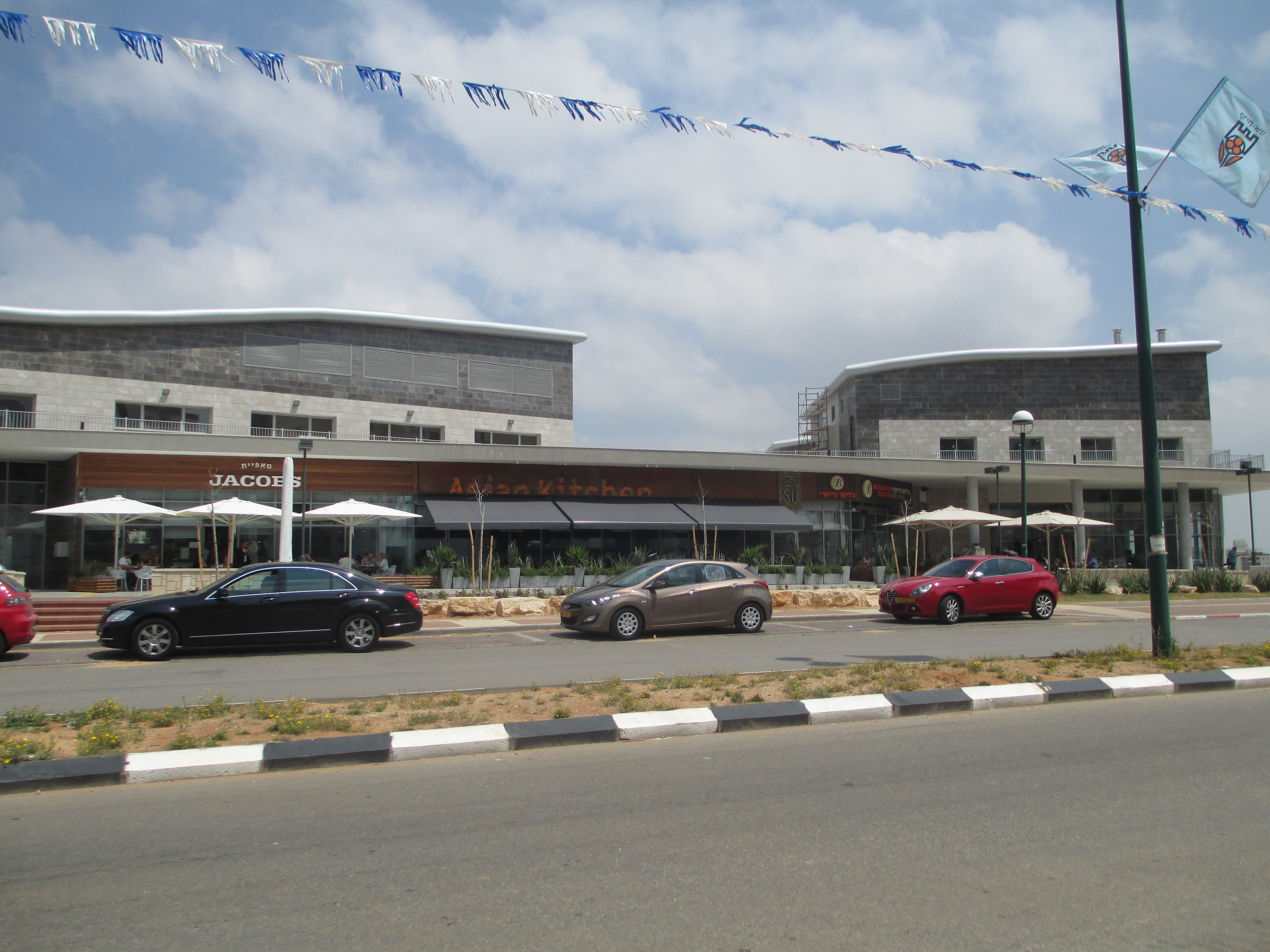
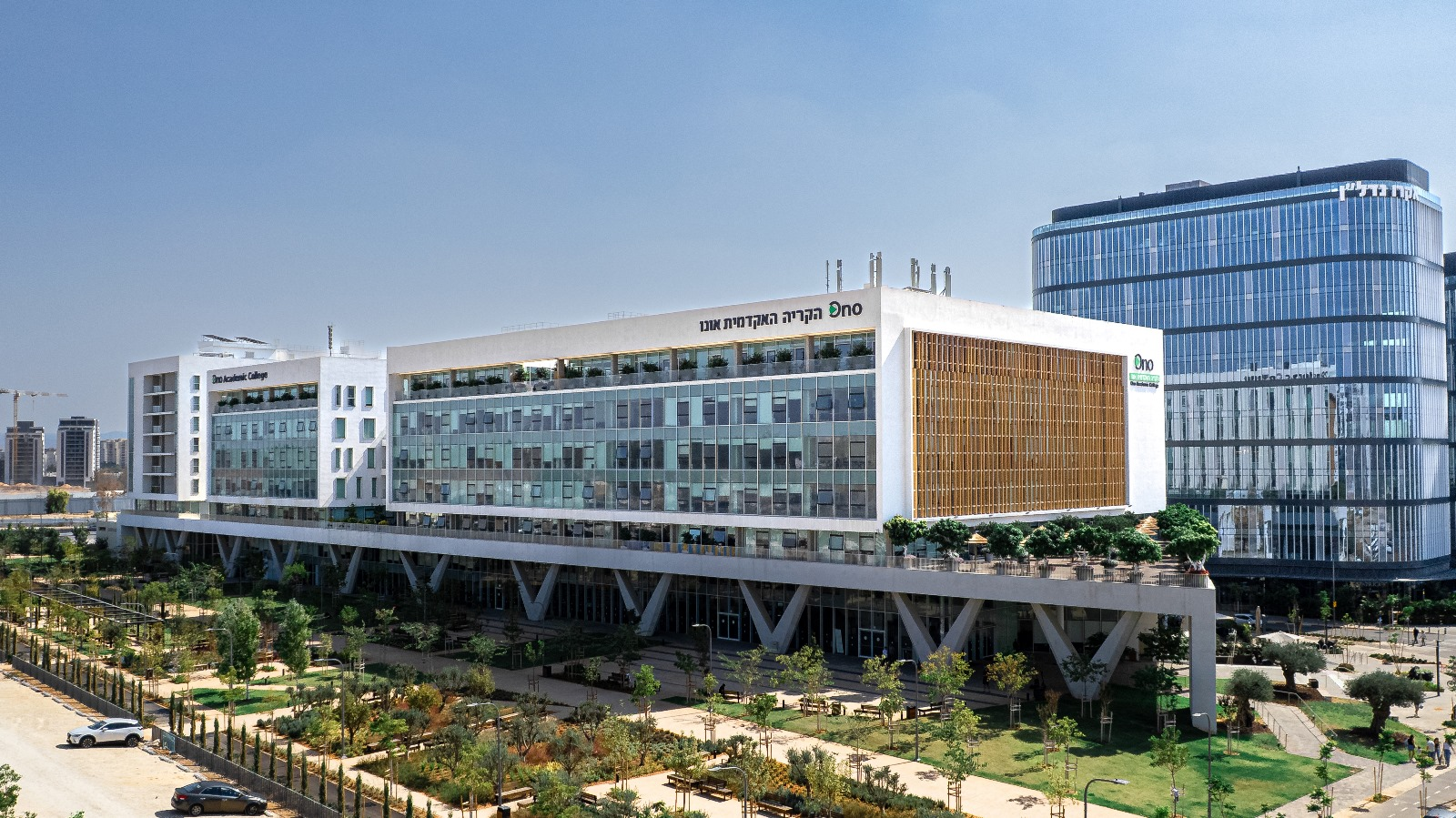

- Location within Central Israel Location within Israel
- Coordinates: 32°03′49″N 34°51′19″E
- Country: Israel
- District: Tel Aviv
- Natural Region: Ramat Gan
- Founded: 1939

Government
  - Mayor: Michal Rozenshine

Area
  - Total: 4,112 dunams (4.112 km^{2}; 1.588 sq mi)

Population (2024)
  - Total: 45,049
  - Density: 10,960/km^{2} (28,370/sq mi)

Ethnicity
  - Jews and others: 99.8%
  - Arabs: 0.2%
- Website: www.kiryatono.muni.il

Kiryat Ono (Hebrew: קִרְיַת אוֹנוֹ, Arabic: كريات أونو) is a city in the Tel Aviv District of Israel. It is located 11 kilometres (7 miles) east of Tel Aviv. In 2024 it had a population of 45,049.

Modern Kiryat Ono is adjacent to the biblical Ono, which was located in what is now the area of Or Yehuda.

== History ==
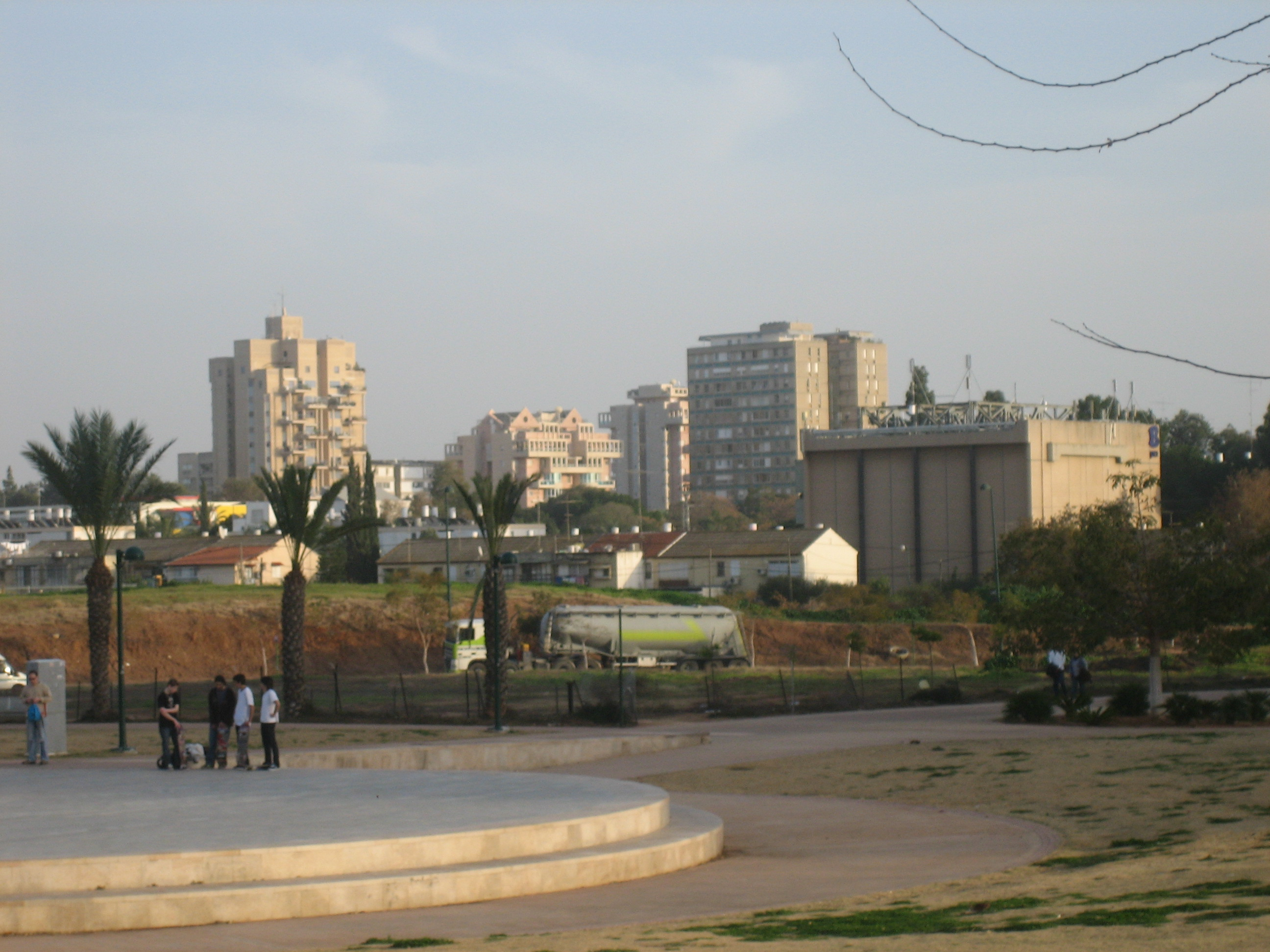
Kiryat Ono skyline

During the 18th and 19th centuries, the area of Kiryat Ono belonged to the Nahiyeh (sub-district) of Lod that encompassed the area of the present-day city of Modi'in-Maccabim-Re'ut in the south to the present-day city of El'ad in the north, and from the foothills in the east, through the Lod Valley to the outskirts of Jaffa in the west. This area was home to thousands of inhabitants in about 20 villages, who had at their disposal tens of thousands of hectares of prime agricultural land.

A settlement named Kfar Ono was established in 1939. During the 1950s, a ma'abara (transit camp for new immigrants in Israel) was established nearby. In 1954, the settlement merged with other communities to form Kiryat Ono. It achieved city status in 1992.

In a park, a lone sycamore tree stands on a hill overlooking the Tel HaShomer base; this tree has been adopted as the city's spiritual and cultural icon. The lands surrounding the tree were owned as agricultural land and maintained by Aryeh Konikov. When the lone tree was planted, it seemed unique in its location, and Mr. Konikov nourished it and maintained the land surrounding it for many years. That land has now become a part of a park named Reisfeld.

== Demographics ==
Historical population
Year	Pop.	±%
1972	17,400	—
1983	21,700	+24.7%
1995	23,700	+9.2%
2008	30,000	+26.6%
2022	41,537	+38.5%
2024	45,048	+8.5%

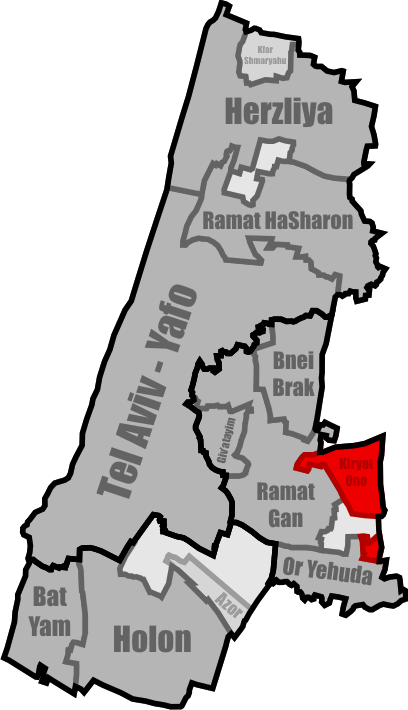
Location of Kiryat Ono in the Tel Aviv District

According to the Israel Central Bureau of Statistics (CBS), in 2001 the ethnic makeup of the city was Jewish and other non-Arabs. Kiryat Ono has grown significantly in recent years. According to CBS, in 2014 there were 17,700 males and 18,900 females. The population of the city was spread out, with 32.4% 19 years of age or younger, 9.8% between 20 and 29, 24.3% between 30 and 44, 14.9% from 45 to 59, 5.0% from 60 to 64, and 13.6% 65 years of age or older. The population growth rate in 2014 was 3.0%.

According to CBS, as of 2013, in the city, there were 16,400 salaried workers and 1,417 self-employed residents. The mean monthly wage in 2013 for a salaried worker in the city was ILS 12,543, a real change of 0.6% over the course of 2012. Salaried males had a mean monthly wage of ILS 15,487 (a real change of 1.0%) versus ILS 9,877 for females (a real change of 0.9%). The mean income for self-employed residents was 12,598. There were 282 people who received unemployment benefits and 162 people who received an income guarantee.

== Education ==
There are 11 schools in the city: 7 state elementary schools (Alumim, Rimonim, Warsaw, Nir, Jacob Cohen, and Sharett), 1 religious state elementary school, 1 Democratic school, 3 middle schools (Shazar, Ben Zvi and Peres Junior High), and 2 high schools (Ben Zvi High school and Katzir High School). 6,465 pupils study at the schools. The city also hosts Ono Academic College, an accredited private college with 8,500 students.

== Voting Patterns ==
In the 2022 election, 67 percent of voters in Kiryat Ono voted for the parties of the center-left coalition led by Yair Lapid, while 30 percent voted for the parties of the right-wing coalition led by Benjamin Netanyahu and 0.3 percent voted for the Arab parties.

In the 2026 election, 70 percent of voters in Kiryat Ono voted for the parties of the center-left coalition led by Gadi Eisenkot, while 25 percent voted for the parties of the right-wing coalition led by Benjamin Netanyahu and 0.3 percent voted for the Arab parties. An additional 3.6 percent voted for the Reservists, and 1.7 percent voted for Amcha Yisrael. Voter turnout increased 26 percent from the 2022 election.

== International relations ==
=== Twin towns ===
Kiryat Ono is twinned with:

- Ioannina, Greece
- Smallingerland, Netherlands
- Drachten, Netherlands
- Dormagen, Germany
- Offenbach (district), Germany

In the year 2009, the twin cities alliance with Drachten suffered from a diplomatic crisis, as the mayor of Drachten was unwilling to visit Kiryat Ono for political reasons. A comedic late night show in GLZ Radio (the IDF radio station) held a campaign to preserve the twin cities agreement. Eventually, the crisis was resolved.

== Notable people ==
- Abigail and Marc-Daniel Aroyo, children murdered in a 1971 terrorist attack
- Gilad Erdan (born 1970), politician
- Eyal Ran (born 1972), tennis player
- Lavih Serfaty (born 1945), artist and author
- Shez (born 1959), poet, writer, playwright, singer, and songwriter
- Yona Wallach (1944–1985), poet
