= Harbu Darbu =

2023 single by Ness and Stilla

"Harbu Darbu" "חרבו דרבו"

Single by Ness and Stilla
- Language: Hebrew
- Released: 14 November 2023
- Genre: Israeli hip hop, drill, trap
- Length: 2:29

Ness and Stilla singles chronology
"תיק קטן" (2023)	"Harbu Darbu" "חרבו דרבו" (2023)

Music video
- "Harbu Darbu" on YouTube

"Harbu Darbu" (Hebrew: חרבו דרבו) is a hip-hop song by Israeli musical duo Ness and Stilla. The song's title refers to "raining hell on one's opponent", being derived from an Arabic expression meaning "war strike" or "mayhem". The lyrics of the song support the soldiers of the Israel Defense Forces and condemn the perpetrators of the Hamas attack on Israel, calling for the deaths of the leaders of Hamas, including Ismail Haniyeh and Mohammed Deif (both killed in July 2024), as well as the pro-Palestinian Western celebrities Bella Hadid, Mia Khalifa, and Dua Lipa.

The single was released on 14 November 2023, just over a month after the attacks, and was featured on the Galgalatz radio station. The song reached number 1 on streaming platforms in Israel in November 2023. The song is generally described as a war song that aimed to channel Israelis' anger at the Hamas attack, other claimed the song was inciting genocide.

== Background and origin ==
Israeli musical duo Ness and Stilla formed in 2023 and had a successful debut single in April 2023 with "Tik Katan" (Small Purse). Recording for "Harbu Darbu" commenced a month after the October Hamas-led attack on Israel. Ness (Nessya Levi) and Stilla (Dor Soroker) said that they wrote "Harbu Darbu" to raise the Israeli people's morale, deciding it was "time to replace the sadness with anger".

The song's name, "Harbu Darbu," is a Hebrew expression derived from the Syrian Arabic حرب وضرب, meaning "mayhem", "war strike", or "swords and strikes". In Hebrew, the phrase evolved through criminal slang and means "to destroy an enemy" or "raining hell on one's opponent".

In a post on Instagram, Soroker and Levi wrote "We are back in the studio. This is the result. This song is not really our song, it's your song. For more than a month, all the fighters, the female fighters, and the security forces all over the country have been giving their hearts and souls for all of us. This song is yours and only yours and you should know it well – every dog gets its day."

== Music and lyrics ==
"Harbu Darbu" is a trap song, typical of Israeli hip hop, with a minimalist drill beat. Vocalists Stilla and Ness trade off verses in the song.

As a patriotic anthem, "Harbu Darbu" praises soldiers of the Israel Defense Forces (IDF). The song's chorus is a roll call of units of the IDF, including the Golani Brigade, the Nahal Brigade, the Armored Corps, the Givati Brigade, the Israeli Navy, the Israeli Air Force, the Artillery Corps, the Paratroopers Brigade, Duvdevan Unit, and M113 armored personnel carriers (Bardelas). In a verse by Ness, she raps about how all the girls have their eyes on the soldiers and remarks on how even the "guy on the news" is beginning to look handsome, referring to television presenter Danny Kushmaro. (Note: Besides Danny Kushmaro, Ness mentioned that Tamir Steinman and Branu Tegene were also "rock stars".) The song endorses writing the names of the Israeli children who died in the Gaza envelope on bomb shells. Another verse says that the slogan "Free Palestine", phrased in the lyrics as "Palestine for Free", sounds like a holiday sale.

"Harbu Darbu" condemns the perpetrators of the Hamas attack on Israel and calls for revenge on anyone who planned, executed, or supported it. It tells the people of Gaza to "wait for [bombs] to rain on you like a debt", with one verse referring to Hamas as "sons of Amalek", echoing Prime Minister Benjamin Netanyahu's statement in the wake of the attack, saying that Israelis were "committed to completely eliminating this evil (of Hamas) from the world", adding: "You must remember what Amalek has done to you, says our Holy Bible. And we do remember." (Note: "You shall remember what Amalek did to you on the way, when you went out of Egypt... when the Lord your God grants you respite from all your enemies around [you] in the land which the Lord, your God, gives to you as an inheritance to possess, that you shall obliterate the remembrance of Amalek from beneath the heavens. You shall not forget!" (Devarim 25:17–19, Torah)) The lyrics call for enemies to be "Xed out", (Note: According to Stilla, "It is known that when you take down a terrorist, you add an X to the weapon.") using the phrase "every dog's day will come" in Arabic, conveying the idea that wrongdoers will eventually face consequences. The song then names a series of enemies, beginning with Hezbollah secretary-general Hassan Nasrallah, Hamas leader Ismail Haniyeh, and Hamas military commander Mohammed Deif. The song goes on to list Western celebrities Bella Hadid, Dua Lipa, and Mia Khalifa, who expressed solidarity with the Palestinian people, and the lyrics have been interpreted by some as calling for retribution against them and by other as calling for their deaths.

== Critical reception ==
A review for "Harbu Darbu" in The Times of Israel found that the song "encapsulates a feeling of righteous fury" following the previous month's Hamas-led attack, while an article in The Jerusalem Post called it an "angry rap tune". Ynet called it an "infectious trap piece", while Dor Meir Moalem of Mako wrote that the song could have a better hook. An article in The Forward called "Harbu Darbu" a "hawkish war cry". The song was featured on the Galgalatz radio station as part of Ido Porat's New and Interesting show. Israel studies professor Shayna Weiss said that the anger and extreme politics of the song are a departure from the sad songs traditionally played on the radio during times of conflict, with "Harbu Darbu" being a "rally around the flag, Zionist anthem" more typical of the Second Intifada. Al Jazeera English and Middle East Eye said that the song endorsed genocide. Billboard magazine included "Harbu Darbu" in a Hanukkah playlist, comparing it to Leonard Cohen's performances for the IDF during the 1973 Yom Kippur War.

Mia Khalifa criticized the song's use of a drill beat, writing "they can't even call for genocide in their own culture, they had to colonize something to get it to #1." Stilla responded to Khalifa, calling her an idiot. A statement by the artists said, "We are happy for the conversation the song is sparking around the world, that everyone will know and remember that we are a strong nation, a strong army and most importantly, everyone gets their due." A separate article for the Global Village Space opined that the song had a "barbaric nature" and its criticism of those speaking out about the treatment of Palestinians had potentially "creat[ed] further concern about the impact of such content on international platforms". The article also addressed cultural appropriation, addressing the song's Syrian Arabic title, repeated use of Arabic language and use of Arabic Nomadic attire in the music video.

== Music video and performances ==
A music video for "Harbu Darbu" was released alongside the single on 14 November 2023. The video, directed by Omer Aloni, features the two musicians in "fashionably casual clothes" in various urban and desert locales, including a warehouse parking lot and a club. During the video, fighter jets fly above in formation. Another source (Global Village Space) described the music video attire as Arabic nomadic dress. Ness and Stilla have performed the song for IDF soldiers.

== Charts ==
As of December 2023, "Harbu Darbu" has received over 13 million views on YouTube and additional millions on Spotify. Videos of Gen Z Israelis dancing and lip synching to "Harbu Darbu" went viral on TikTok.

Chart performance for "Harbu Darbu"
Chart (2023)	Peak position
Israel Media Forest	8
