= Matvey Natanzon =

Israeli backgammon player (1968–2020)

- Born: July 5, 1968; Soviet Union
- Died: February 14, 2020 (aged 51)
- Education: SUNY Buffalo
- Occupation: Backgammon player

Matvey Natanzon (better known by his pseudonym Falafel) (July 5, 1968 – February 14, 2020) was a Russian-born Israeli backgammon player.

== Life and career ==
Natanzon was born in Soviet Russia and moved with his mother to Azor, a small Israeli town near Tel Aviv, in 1972. He moved to Buffalo, New York, as a teenager. Natanzon graduated from the State University of New York at Buffalo in 1991 with a degree in accounting. Shortly thereafter he moved to Manhattan. Homeless, he lived for 6 months in Washington Square Park and learned to hustle chess and backgammon from local gamblers. Some of Natanzon's associates at that time went on to become famous poker players, including Phil Laak, Gus Hansen, and Abe Mosseri. Natanzon himself played poker and was part owner of a card parlor in Tel Aviv.

In 2005 Natanzon played on the Israeli team in the Nations Cup backgammon tournament.

In 2007, Natanzon was named the number one backgammon player in the world by an unscientifically compiled peer-audited review known as Giants of Backgammon. Although the rankings are not precise, Jake Jacobs, the list's compiler, says about it that "We can never know for certain who is the best player in a given year, but we can confidently eliminate 99.99 per cent. Falafel survived the cut."

Natanzon died on February 14, 2020 of GBM.
