= Branu Tegene =

Ethiopian-born Israeli journalist

- ברהנו טגניה
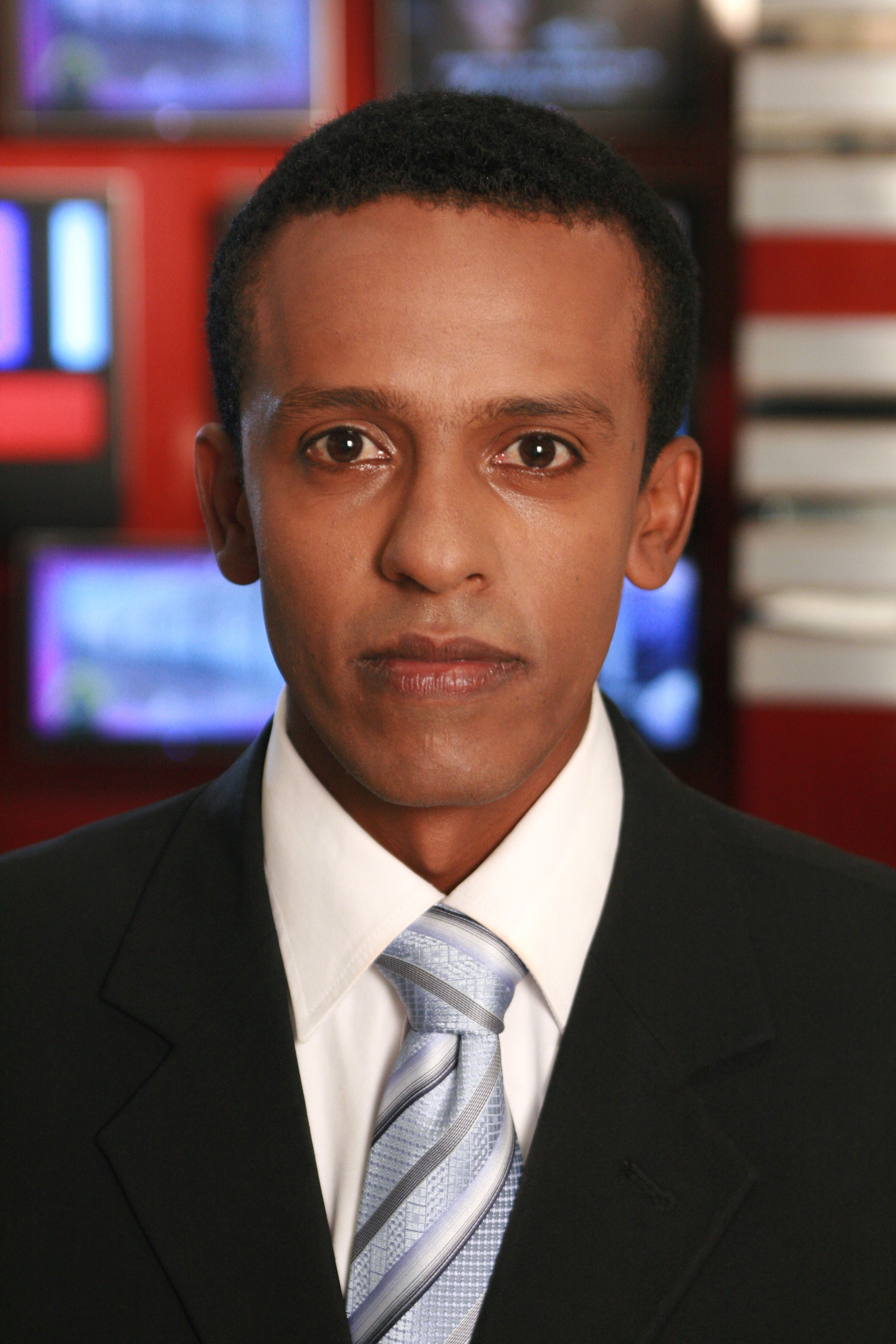
- Born: Ethiopia
- Citizenship: Israel
- Education: Reichman University
- Years active: 2007–present
- Television: Hevrat HaHadashot
- Title: Investigative journalist

Branu Tegene (Hebrew: ברהנו טגניה; born August 3, 1981) is an Israeli journalist and crime reporter for Hevrat HaHadashot.

== Biography ==
Tegene was born in Ethiopia to a father who was a teacher and school principal, and a mother who was a homemaker. He immigrated to Israel with his parents and sister in 1992 as part of the continuation of Operation Solomon. He has three brothers. The family initially lived in an immigrant absorption center in Arad.

As a teenager, Tegene survived the Arad Festival disaster, an incident that later led to him being interviewed by the media. During his military service, he enlisted in the Israeli Naval Academy but was eventually transferred to the Artillery Corps, where he served as an officer.

Tegene studied for a bachelor's degree in law and business administration at Reichman University but did not complete the program. During his studies, he volunteered with the Tabeka Association, an organization dedicated to promoting the rights and opportunities of Ethiopian Israelis and combating the discrimination and racism faced by the community. He also worked at the Israeli Ethiopian television channel IETV. Additionally, he participated in a communications course for Ethiopian expatriates led by Anat Saragusti and organized by the Agenda organization (now known as "Ano").

In 2008, Tegene began working at Channel 2 as a crime reporter.

From 2016 to 2019, Tegene co-hosted a weekly radio program on crime alongside Gilad Shalmor on Radio Lelo Hafsaka (103fm).

In 2020, Tegene was awarded the journalism prize by B'nai B'rith.

== Personal life ==
Tegene is a fan of Maccabi Haifa F.C. and resides in Azor.
