= Districts of Israel =

Districts of Israel מְחוֹזוֹת יִשְׂרָאֵל (Hebrew) مناطق اسرائيل (Arabic)
- Category: Unitary state
- Location: State of Israel
- Number: 6
- Populations: 1,159,594 (Haifa) – 2,409,464 (Central District)
- Areas: 190 km^{2} (72 sq mi) (Tel Aviv) – 14,190 km^{2} (5,477 sq mi) (Southern District)
- Government: District government
- Subdivisions: City council, Local council, Regional council

Districts, Subdistricts and Natural Regions of the State of Israel, 2018

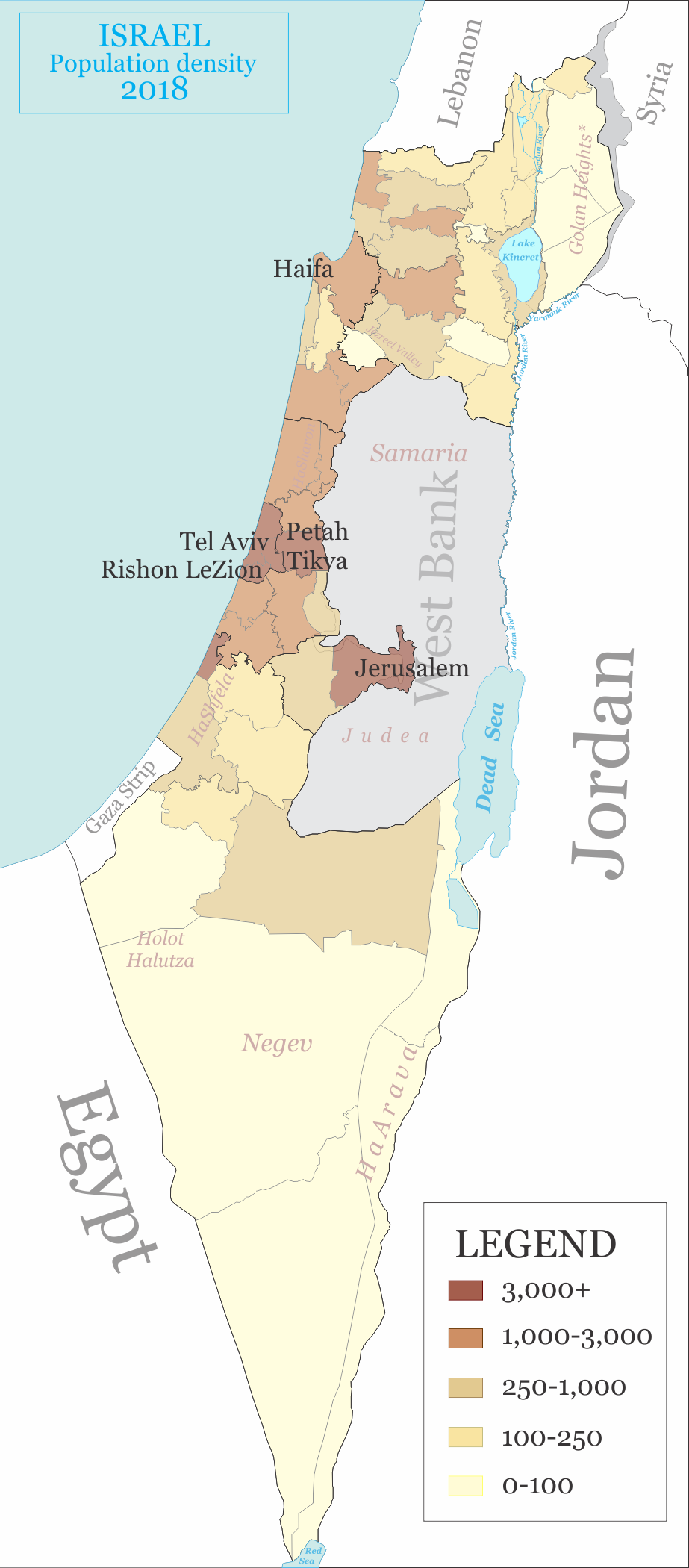
Population density by natural region, subdistrict, and district in 2018 (thicker border indicates higher tier)

There are six main administrative districts of Israel, known in Hebrew as mekhozot (מְחוֹזוֹת; sing. מָחוֹז, makhoz) and in Arabic as mintaqah. There are also 15 subdistricts of Israel, known in Hebrew nafot (נָפוֹת; sing. נָפָה, nafa) and in Arabic as qadaa. Each subdistrict is further divided into natural regions, which in turn are further divided into council-level divisions: whether they might be cities, municipalities, or regional councils.

The present division into districts was established in 1953, to replace the divisions inherited from the British Mandate. It has remained substantially the same ever since; a second proclamation of district boundaries issued in 1957—which remains in force as of 2023—only affirmed the existing boundaries in place.

The figures in this article are based on numbers from the Israeli Central Bureau of Statistics and so include all places under Israeli civilian rule including those Israeli-occupied territories where this is the case. Therefore, Golan Subdistrict and its four natural regions are included in the number of subdistricts and natural regions even though it is not recognized by the United Nations or the international community as Israeli territory. Similarly, the population figure below for the Jerusalem District was calculated including East Jerusalem whose annexation by Israel is similarly not recognized by the United Nations and the international community. The Judea and Samaria Area, however, is not included in the number of districts and subdistricts as Israel has not applied its civilian jurisdiction in that part of the West Bank.

== Administration ==
The districts have no elected institutions of any kind, although they do possess councils composed of representatives of central government ministries and local authorities for planning and building purposes. Their administration is undertaken by a District Commissioner appointed by the Minister of the Interior. Each district also has a District Court.

Since the District Commissioners are considered part of the Ministry of the Interior's bureaucracy, they can only exercise functions falling within the purview of other ministries if the appropriate Minister authorizes them. This authorization is rarely granted, as other government ministries and institutions (for example, the Ministry of Health and the Police) establish their own divergent systems of districts.

== Jerusalem District ==
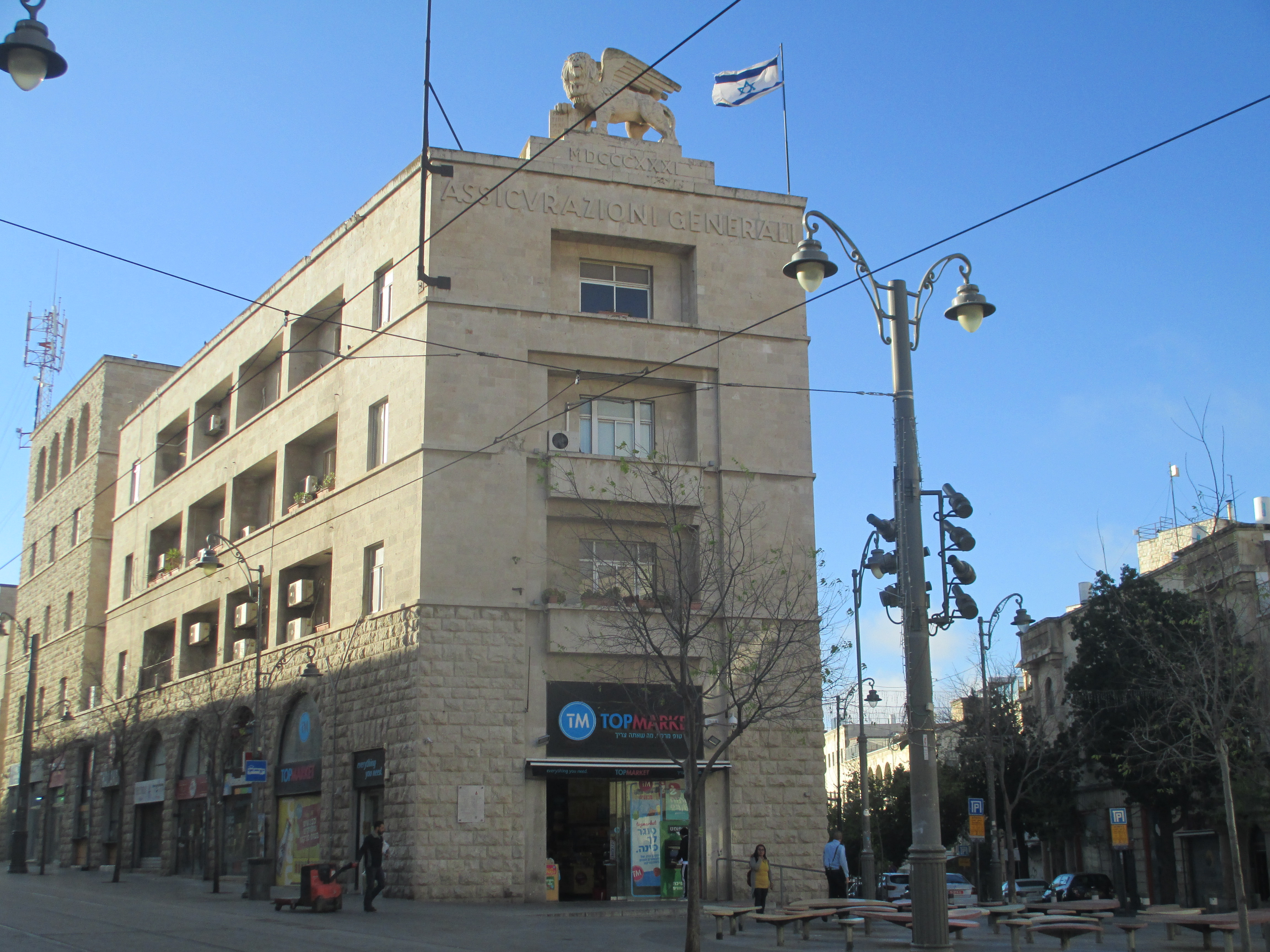
Generali Building houses the offices of the Jerusalem District Administration

Jerusalem District (Hebrew: מְחוֹז יְרוּשָׁלַיִם, Mehoz Yerushalayim)

Area: 653 km^{2}
Population (EoY 2024): 1,331,595
District capital: Jerusalem (Note: This district includes areas captured in the 1967 Six-Day War and annexed to Israel in the Jerusalem Law.)

Natural regions:

- 111 Judean Mountains (largest city: Jerusalem)
- 112 Judean Foothills (largest city: Beit Shemesh)

== Northern District ==
Northern District (Hebrew: מְחוֹז הַצָּפוּן, Mehoz HaTzafon)

Area: 4,473 km^{2}
Population (EoY 2024): 1,581,700
District capital: Nof HaGalil

Subdistricts and natural regions:

- Safed (Tzfat) Subdistrict – population: 135,052
  - 211 Hula Valley (largest city: Kiryat Shmona)
  - 212 Eastern Upper Galilee (largest city: Safed)
  - 213 Hazor (largest city: Hatzor HaGlilit)
  - 214 Central Lower Galilee (largest city: Tefahot)
- Kinneret Subdistrict – population: 125,554
  - 221 Kinerot (largest city: Tiberias)
  - 222 Eastern Lower Galilee (largest city: Maghar)
- Yizre'el Subdistrict – population: 571,398
  - 231 Bet She’an Valley (largest city: Beit She'an)
  - 232 Harod Valley (largest city: Gan Ner)
  - 233 Kokhav Plateau (largest city: Kafr Misr)
  - 234 Yizre’el Valley (largest city: Afula)
  - 235 Yoqne'am (largest city: Yokneam Illit)
  - 236 Menashe Plateau (largest city: Ramot Menashe)
  - 237 Nazareth-Tir'an Mountains (largest city: Nazareth)
- Akko Subdistrict – population: 692,085
  - 241 Shefar'am (largest city: Shefa-Amr)
  - 242 Karmi'el (largest city: Karmiel)
  - 243 Yehi'am (largest city: Ma'alot-Tarshiha)
  - 244 Elon (largest city: Hurfeish)
  - 245 Nahariyya (largest city: Nahariya)
  - 246 Akko (largest city: Acre)
- Golan Subdistrict (Note: Occupied in the 1967 Six-Day War and annexed by Israel's Golan Heights Law, which has only been recognized internationally by the United States and Colombia.) – population: 57,611
  - 291 Hermon (largest city: Majdal Shams)
  - 292 Northern Golan (largest city: Buq'ata)
  - 293 Middle Golan (largest city: Katzrin)
  - 294 Southern Golan (largest city: Haspin)

== Haifa District ==
Israel Districts and Capitals

Haifa District (Hebrew: מְחוֹז חֵיפָה, Mehoz Heifa)

Area: 866 km^{2}
Population (EoY 2024): 1,159,594
District capital: Haifa

Subdistricts and natural regions:

- Haifa Subdistrict – population: 634,396
  - 311 Haifa (largest city: Haifa)
- Hadera Subdistrict – population: 525,198
  - 321 Karmel Coast (largest city: Fureidis)
  - 322 Zikhron Ya’aqov (largest city: Zikhron Ya'akov)
  - 323 Alexander Mountain (largest city: Umm al-Fahm)
  - 324 Hadera (largest city: Hadera)

== Central District ==
Central District (מְחוֹז הַמֶּרְכָּז, Mehoz HaMerkaz)

Area: 1,294 km^{2}
Population (EoY 2024): 2,409,464
District capital: Ramla

Subdistricts and natural regions:

- HaSharon Subdistrict – population: 516,481
  - 411 Western Sharon (largest city: Netanya)
  - 412 Eastern Sharon (largest city: Tayibe)
- Petah Tikva Subdistrict – population: 838,354
  - 421 Southern Sharon (largest city: Kfar Saba)
  - 422 Petah Tikva (largest city: Petah Tikva)
- Ramla Subdistrict – population: 405,884
  - 431 Modi'in (largest city: Modi'in-Maccabim-Re'ut)
  - 432 Ramla (largest city: Lod)
- Rehovot Subdistrict – population: 648,745
  - 441 Rehovot (largest city: Rehovot)
  - 442 Rishon LeZiyyon (largest city: Rishon LeZion)

== Tel Aviv District ==
Tel Aviv District (Hebrew: מְחוֹז תֵּל־אָבִיב, Mehoz Tel Aviv)

Area: 172 km^{2}
Population (EoY 2024): 1,539,096
District capital: Tel Aviv

Natural regions:

- 511 Tel Aviv (largest city: Tel Aviv-Yafo)
- 512 Ramat Gan (largest city: Bnei Brak)
- 513 Holon (largest city: Holon)

== Southern District ==
Southern District (Hebrew: מְחוֹז הַדָּרוֹם, Mehoz HaDarom)

Area: 14,185 km^{2}
Population (EoY 2024): 1,444,259
District capital: Beersheba

Subdistricts and natural regions:

- Ashkelon Subdistrict – population: 628,684
  - 611 Mal'akhi (largest city: Kiryat Malakhi)
  - 612 Lakhish (largest city: Kiryat Gat)
  - 613 Ashdod (largest city: Ashdod)
  - 614 Ashqelon (largest city: Ashkelon)
- Be'er Sheva Subdistrict – population: 815,575 (Note: This statistic is incomplete, as it does not include Bedouins who lived in unrecognized villages.)
  - 621 Gerar (largest city: Netivot)
  - 622 Besor (largest city: Ofakim)
  - 623 Be'er Sheva (largest city: Beersheba)
  - 624 Dead Sea (largest city: Ein Gedi)
  - 625 Arava (largest city: Eilat)
  - 626 Northern Negev Mountains (largest city: Dimona)
  - 627 Southern Negev Mountains (largest city: Ne'ot Smadar)

Formerly the Hof Aza Regional Council with a population of approx. 10,000 Israelis was a part of this district, but the Israeli communities that constituted it were evacuated when the disengagement plan was implemented on the Gaza Strip. Since the withdrawal, the Coordination and Liaison Administration operates there.

== Judea and Samaria Area ==
Judea and Samaria Area (Hebrew: אֵזוֹר יְהוּדָה וְשׁוֹמְרוֹן, Ezor Yehuda VeShomron)

Area: 172 km^{2}
Israeli population (EoY 2024): 514,496
Arab/Bedouin population: 40,000. (excludes Area A and Area B).
Largest city: Modi'in Illit

The name Judea and Samaria for this geographical area is based on terminology from the Hebrew Bible and other sources relating to ancient Israel and Judah/Judea. The territory has been under Israeli control since the 1967 Six-Day War but not annexed by Israel, pending negotiations regarding its status. It is part of historic Israel, which leads to politically contentious issues. However, it is not recognized as part of the State of Israel by the United Nations.

There are no subdistricts or administratively declared "natural regions" in the Judea and Samaria Area.

== See also ==
- Geography of Israel
- ISO 3166-2:IL
- List of cities in Israel
