= Holon Natural Region =

Coordinates: 32°00′47″N 34°46′29″E

- Natural Region
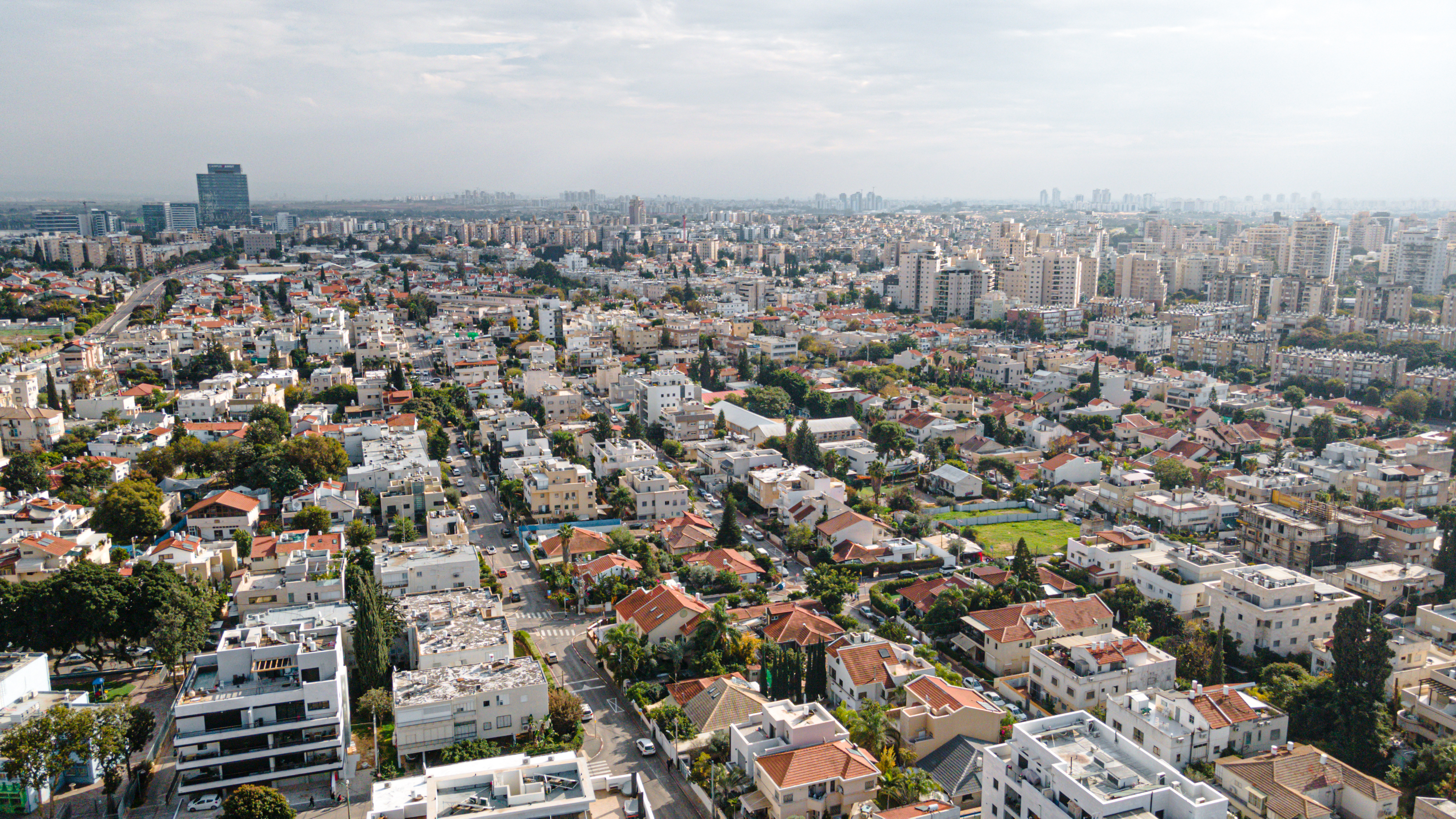
- View of Holon
- Country: Israel
- District: Tel Aviv
- Subdistrict: none
- Largest City: Holon

Area
  - Total: 37 km^{2} (14 sq mi)

Population (2024)
  - Total: 334,814

Ethnicity
  - Jews and others: 96.1%
  - Arabs: 0.7%

The Holon Natural Region is a natural region in the Tel Aviv District of Israel. Holon is the largest city in the natural region.

== Geography ==
Districts, Subdistricts and Natural Regions of the State of Israel, 2018

The natural region consists of suburban areas immediately to the south of Tel Aviv. It has an area of 37 km^{2}, making it the smallest natural region in Israel by area. Holon, the largest city in the natural region, contains 57 percent of the natural region's population, and Bat Yam accounts for most of the remainder. The two other localities in the natural region are much smaller.

== Demographics ==
The vast majority of the residents of the Holon Natural Region are Jewish. There are no Arab towns in the natural region.

Historical population
Year	Pop.	±%
1972	205,300	—
1983	268,700	+30.9%
1995	306,800	+14.2%
2008	317,460	+3.5%
2022	334,345	+5.3%
2024	334,814	+0.1%

== Administrative local authorities ==
Cities	Local Councils	Villages
Bat Yam; Holon	Azor	Mikveh Israel

== Voting Patterns ==
In the 2022 election, 57 percent of voters in the natural region voted for the parties of the right-wing coalition led by Benjamin Netanyahu, while 41 percent voted for the parties of the center-left coalition led by Yair Lapid and 0.2 percent voted for the Arab parties.

In the 2026 election, 50 percent of voters in the natural region voted for the parties of the right-wing coalition led by Benjamin Netanyahu, while 43 percent voted for the parties of the center-left coalition led by Gadi Eisenkot and 0.3 percent voted for the Arab parties. An additional 4 percent voted for the Reservists, and 1.5 percent voted for Amcha Yisrael. Voter turnout increased 11 percent from the 2022 election.
