= Tel Aviv District =

District of Israel

Coordinates: 32°05′N 34°48′E

- District of Israel

transcription(s)
  - Hebrew: מחוז תל אביב
  - Arabic: منطقة تل أبيب
- Flag

- Interactive map of Tel Aviv District
- Cities: 10
- Local Councils: 2
- Regional Councils: 0
- Principal city: Tel Aviv

Government
  - District Commissioner: Carmit Fenton

Area
  - Total: 171 km^{2} (66 sq mi)

Population (2024)
  - Total: 1,539,096
  - Density: 9,000/km^{2} (23,300/sq mi)
- ISO 3166 code: IL-TA

The Tel Aviv District (Hebrew: מחוז תל אביב; Arabic: منطقة تل أبيب) is one of the six administrative districts of Israel and has a population of 1.54 million residents across 171 square kilometers (66 sq mi). The district is centred around the Tel Aviv metropolitan area and its population is almost entirely Jewish. Despite being geographically smallest, it is the most densely populated district of Israel. It is 98.9% Jewish and 1.10% Arab (0.7% Muslim, 0.4% Christian).

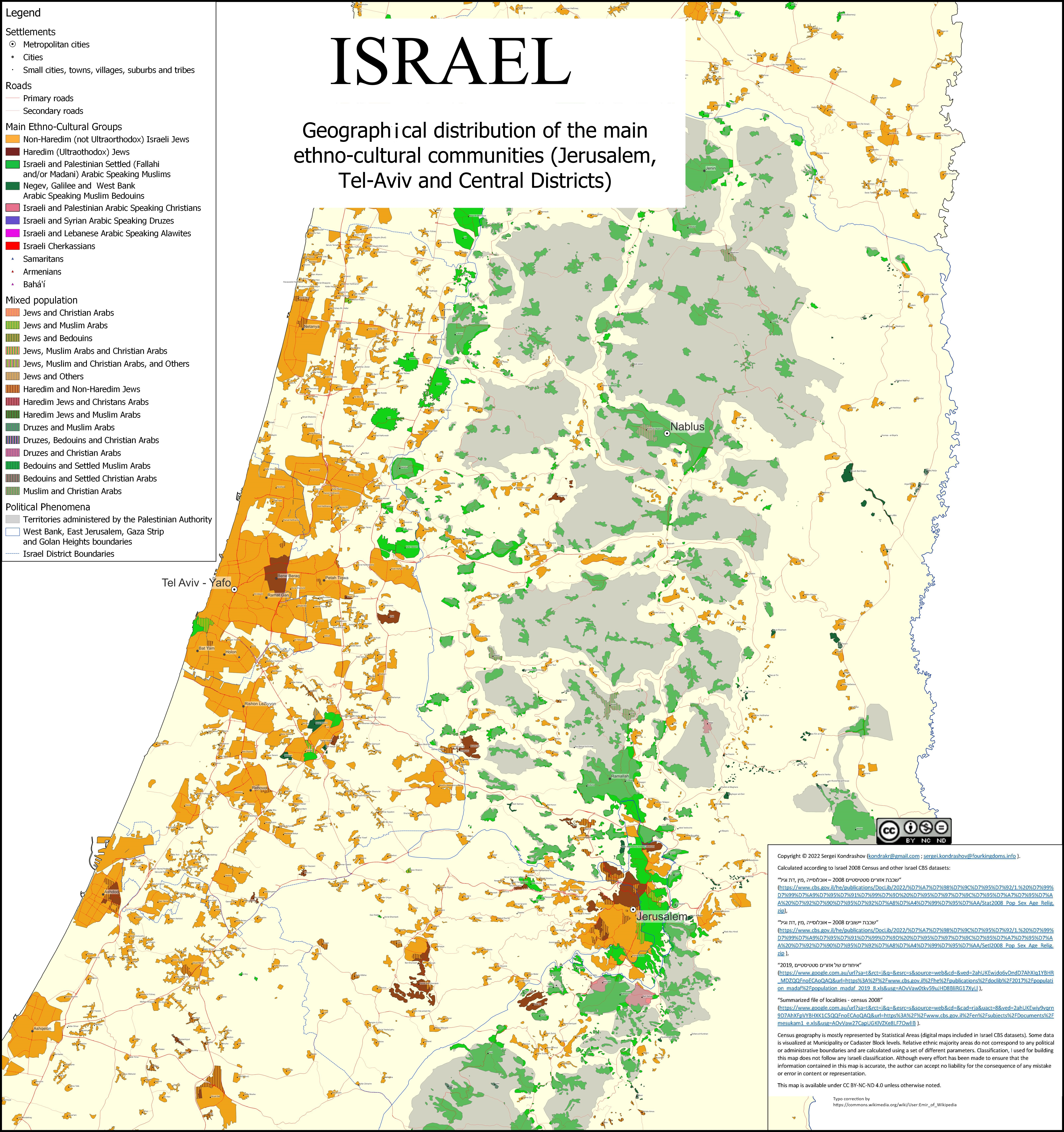
Geographical distribution of the main ethno-cultural communities Jerusalem, Tel-Aviv and Central districts.

== History ==
Hirsch Barenblat was tried in the district court of the Tel Aviv District for his involvement with the Jewish Ghetto Police during World War II.

== Geography ==
The total size of the district is 171 square kilometers (66 sq mi).

== Economics ==
In 1980, 63% of computer operations employment and 45% of all computers in Israel was inside the district.

The gross domestic product per capita of the district was higher than the average for Israel in 1990.

== Demographics ==
Historical population
Year	Pop.	±%
1972	913,300	—
1983	993,500	+8.8%
1995	1,130,200	+13.8%
2008	1,258,860	+11.4%
2022	1,502,615	+19.4%
2024	1,539,096	+2.4%

The district is mainly the Tel Aviv metropolitan area.

In 1948, 43% of Israel's Jewish population resided in the Tel Aviv district. This share of the Jewish population declined to 34% in 1967, 27.8% in 1988, 22% in 2000, and 20.5% in 2008. The population of the district that is Jewish was 98.8% in 1948, 99.1% in 1967, 98.7% in 1988, 98.8% in 2000, and 98.5% in 2008. The Central District surpassed the Tel Aviv District as the most populated in Israel in the 1990s.

In 1990, 22.5% of Israel's immigrant population resided in the Tel Aviv District.

== Administrative local authorities ==
Natural Regions
Holon; Ramat Gan; Tel Aviv
Cities	Local Councils
Tel Aviv-Yafo (Note: Part of the Tel Aviv Natural Region.); Bat Yam (Note: Part of the Holon Natural Region.); Bnei Brak (Note: Part of the Ramat Gan Natural Region.); Givatayim; Herzliya; Holon; Kiryat Ono; Or Yehuda; Ramat Gan; Ramat HaSharon	Azor; Kfar Shmaryahu

Notes

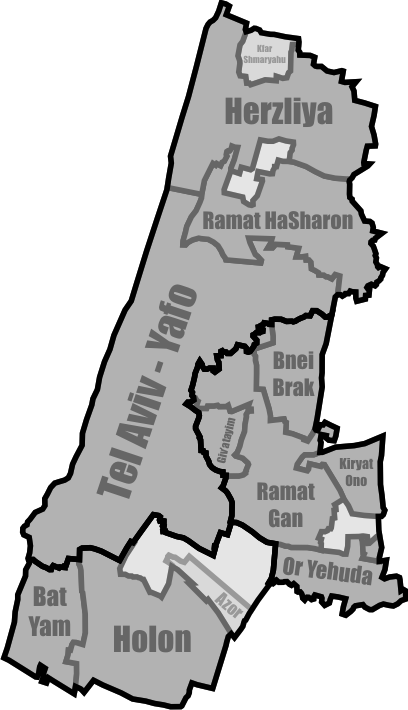
Map

=== List of cities and towns in Tel Aviv district ===
Pop Rank	Name	Population	Land Area (Dunams)	Founded	City Since	Natural Region
1	Tel Aviv-Yafo	494,900	51,788	1909	1921^{A} 1950^{B}	Tel Aviv
2	Bnei Brak	229,995	7,343	1924	1950	Ramat Gan
3	Holon	191,829	18,927	1940	1950	Holon
4	Ramat Gan	172,242	13,229	1921	1950	Ramat Gan
5	Bat Yam	129,495	8,167	1926	1958	Holon
6	Herzliya	110,885	21,850	1924	1960	Tel Aviv
7	Giv'atayim	58,600	3,246	1922	1959	Ramat Gan
8	Ramat HaSharon	48,860	16,792	1923	2002	Tel Aviv
9	Kiryat Ono	45,048	4,112	1939	1992	Ramat Gan
10	Or Yehuda	41,130	5,141	1949	1988	Ramat Gan
11	Azor	13,067	2,415	1948		Holon
12	Kfar Shmaryahu	1,981	2,665	1937		Tel Aviv
13	Glil Yam (Hof HaSharon RC)	641	-	1943		Tel Aviv
14	Mikveh Israel	423	3,300	1870		Holon
A 1921 Official establishment of Tel Aviv Municipality; B 1950 Merger of municipalities of Tel Aviv and Jaffa

== See also ==
- Districts of Israel
- List of cities in Israel

== Works cited ==
=== Books ===
- Kellerman, Aharon (1993). Society and Settlement: Jewish Land of Israel in the Twentieth Century. SUNY Press. ISBN 0791412954.

=== Journals ===
- Evans, Matt (2011). "Population Dispersal Policy and the 1990s Immigration Wave". Israel Studies. 16 (1). Indiana University Press: 104–128. doi:10.2307/isr.2011.16.1.104. JSTOR isr.2011.16.1.104.
- Kipnis, Baruch (1998). "Spatial Reach of Office Firms: Case Study in the Metropolitan CBD of Tel Aviv, Israel". Geografiska Annaler. 80 (1). Swedish Society for Anthropology and Geography: 17–28. doi:10.2307/490343. JSTOR 490343.
- Lipshitz, Gabriel (1997). "Immigrants from the Former Soviet Union in the Israeli Housing Market: Spatial Aspects of Supply and Demand". Urban Studies. 34 (3). Sage Publishing: 471–488. doi:10.2307/43083377. JSTOR 43083377.
- Portnov, Boris (1998). "The Effect of Housing on Migrations in Israel: 1988-1994". Journal of Population Economics. 11 (3). Springer Science+Business Media: 379–394. doi:10.2307/20007592. JSTOR 20007592.
- Shaked, Michal (2015). "The Unknown Eichmann Trial: The Story of the Judge". Holocaust and Genocide Studies. 29 (1). Oxford University Press: 1–38.

=== Web ===
- "Tel Aviv District". Council for Conservation of Heritage Sites in Israel. Archived from the original on 14 June 2026.
