= Anat Saragusti =

Israeli journalist, publicist and jurist

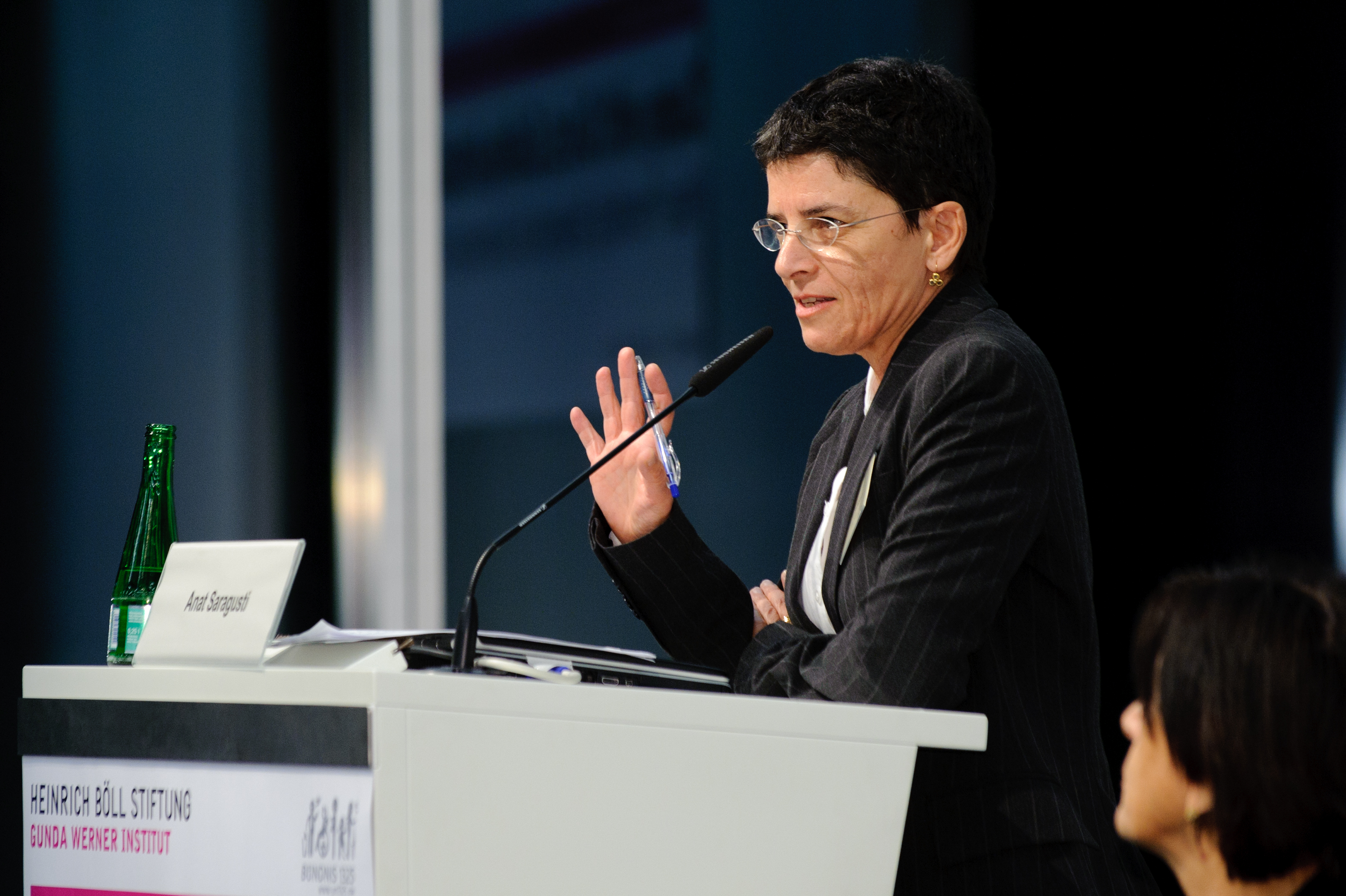
Anat Saragusti in October 2010 at a conference in Berlin

Anat Saragusti (Hebrew: ענת סרגוסטי), born in Jerusalem, Israel on 1953 is an Israeli journalist, a publicist and a jurist. Saragusti is in charge of the freedom of the press at the Union of Journalists in Israel. Anat's professional career includes Former CEO of Agenda (Israeli Center for Strategic Communications), former news editor, reporter and photographer. Anat is known as a peace activist and a Human rights advocate. She is among the founders of Ta Ha'Itonaiyot (a group of leading Israeli women with media orientation) and Merkaz Media Nashim (Gender Media Center).

== Biography ==
Anat is a descendant of the Saragusti family, a surname popular among Jewish families originating from the city of Zaragoza (a.k.a. Saragossa) in northeastern Spain.

Anat's ancestors came to Jerusalem at the end of the 15th century following the Spanish Inquisition and resided in the city ever since. Her family is among a handful of the oldest Jewish families of Jerusalem with lineages traced to our time.

At the age of 17 Anat joined the Israeli Black Panthers movement and participated in the movement's major demonstration in August 1971. During her army service in the IDF, she took part in the 1973 Yom Kippur War. At the age of 21 she met Avraham Bardugo, then a law student and later a well known lawyer, an activist and the one who granted the Israeli Black Panthers their name. Anat and Avraham share a son.

== Media activity ==
In 1980, following the completion of her photography studies, Anat Saragusti started working as a photographer and reporter for the weekly newspaper Ha´olam Hazeh (This world), a former leading weekly newspaper in Israel, under the editorship of Uri Avneri. There she reviewed the most significant events of the decade in Israel: The evacuation of Yamit and Southern Sinai regions as part of the Israel peace agreement with Egypt in 1981, the First Lebanese War in 1982, the First Intifada (Palestinian uprising) in 1987 and more. The First Lebanese War of 1982 was the background for Saragusti's most significant journalism achievement of the period: The first Israeli interview with Yasser Arafat, head of the Palestine Liberation Organization (PLO), in besieged Beirut. This journalism accomplishment, shared with journalists Uri Avneri and Sarit Ishai, was one of the major milestones in the history of Israeli journalism and it re-charted the course of journalism and freedom of expression. This event is studied ever since in various journalism academies. According to Dr. Rona Sela, the historian of local photography in Israel, Saragusti is Israel's first female war photographer.

The year 1984 saw Saragusti achieving yet another journalism accomplishment as she recorded agents of the Israeli General Security Service carrying, Shin Bet the Bus 300 affair – an event that later became known as Parashat HaShabak (The Shabak Affair) – on the first page of Ha´olam Hazeh. In 1994 she joined the team that established the Israeli News Company of Channel 2, the first and leading commercial TV station in Israel. She was the first woman appointed as TV reporter for the Gaza Strip, and for certain short periods of time she was residing in Gaza. Later she fulfilled major editorship positions in the News Company, editing the main news broadcast and the weekly news broadcast named Ulpan Shishi, as well as other programs.

In 2001-2002 Anat was granted the Hubert H. Humphrey scholarship, sponsored by the U.S. Department of State and she then traveled to the United States. Serving as Channel 2's reporter in Washington, she comprehensively reviewed the September 11 terror attack. That year she was also invited to participate in forums and panels exploring the global media's role in times of terror events, and was vastly accepted as a popular speaker, with her Middle East experience. Upon returning to Israel she became a senior reporter for the foreign news department and directed documentaries to the weekly news broadcast Ulpan Shishi. During the years 2007-2008 she resided in the southern town of Sderot – being within a rocket range from the Gaza strip – in order to report firsthand about life in the repeatedly bombed town. Saragusti was the first reporter to do that and her work included the production and release of a short documentary called Yoman Shderot (The Shderot Diary). Im September 2008 she released her second documentary, The Citizen Aloni, telling the story of Shulamit Aloni one of the most significant and dominant women in Israeli public life throughout recent decades. Anat's achievements as a journalism photographer have been widely presented, both locally and globally. She participated in the first biennale for photography in Ein-Harod (1986) and in other group exhibitions. The exhibition "Anat Saragusti – Photographs from Ha´olam Hazeh 1980-1993" was introduced during 2009, while in the year before, 2008, her photographs were presented at the Haifa Museum as part of the comprehensive display in honor of Israel's 60th anniversary. In June 2008 Anat was requested to lead Agenda, Israeli Center for Strategic Communications. In order to direct the media and social change activities of this non-profit organization she retired from her job at the Channel 2 News Company. In 2020 Saragusti joined the Union of Journalists in Israel.

== Social and feminist activity ==
As of the 1980s Anat Saragusti has been engaged in numerous social ventures, and her main areas of interest focused on the Israeli–Palestinian conflict as well as women promotion and minority integration within the Israeli society. As part of her activities Anat served as the editor for feminist and social publications.

In 2005 Saragusti initiated and directed the first vocational training courses qualifying black Ethiopian youth for press jobs. Graduates of these courses, under Anat's assistance, obtained prominent positions within the Israeli media. One became a leading reporter of the Channel 2 news broadcasts, and another is currently a member of the Israeli parliament, the Knesset.

Simultaneously, Saragusti acted for integrating Palestinian citizens of Israel within leading roles of the Israeli media and directed numerous courses qualifying Arabic youth for press jobs.

Anat Saragusti is a dedicated volunteer. She has been a board member of The Association for Civil Rights in Israel (since 2006), and is a founding member in the board of directors of Itach-Maaki – Women Lawyers for Social Justice, a non-profit organization addressing the needs and rights of poor and low-income women. It is within this framework that she initiated the project called "No Women, No Security!", based on UNSCR decision 1325. Anat was a steering committee member of the group named "International Women Commission for just and sustainable peace between Israelis and Palestinians", which was active from 2005 to 2011 for promoting women integration in decision-making centers addressing peace and peace processes, based on UNSCR decision 1325.
