= Tel Aviv Natural Region =

Coordinates: 32°04′50″N 34°46′50″E

- Natural Region
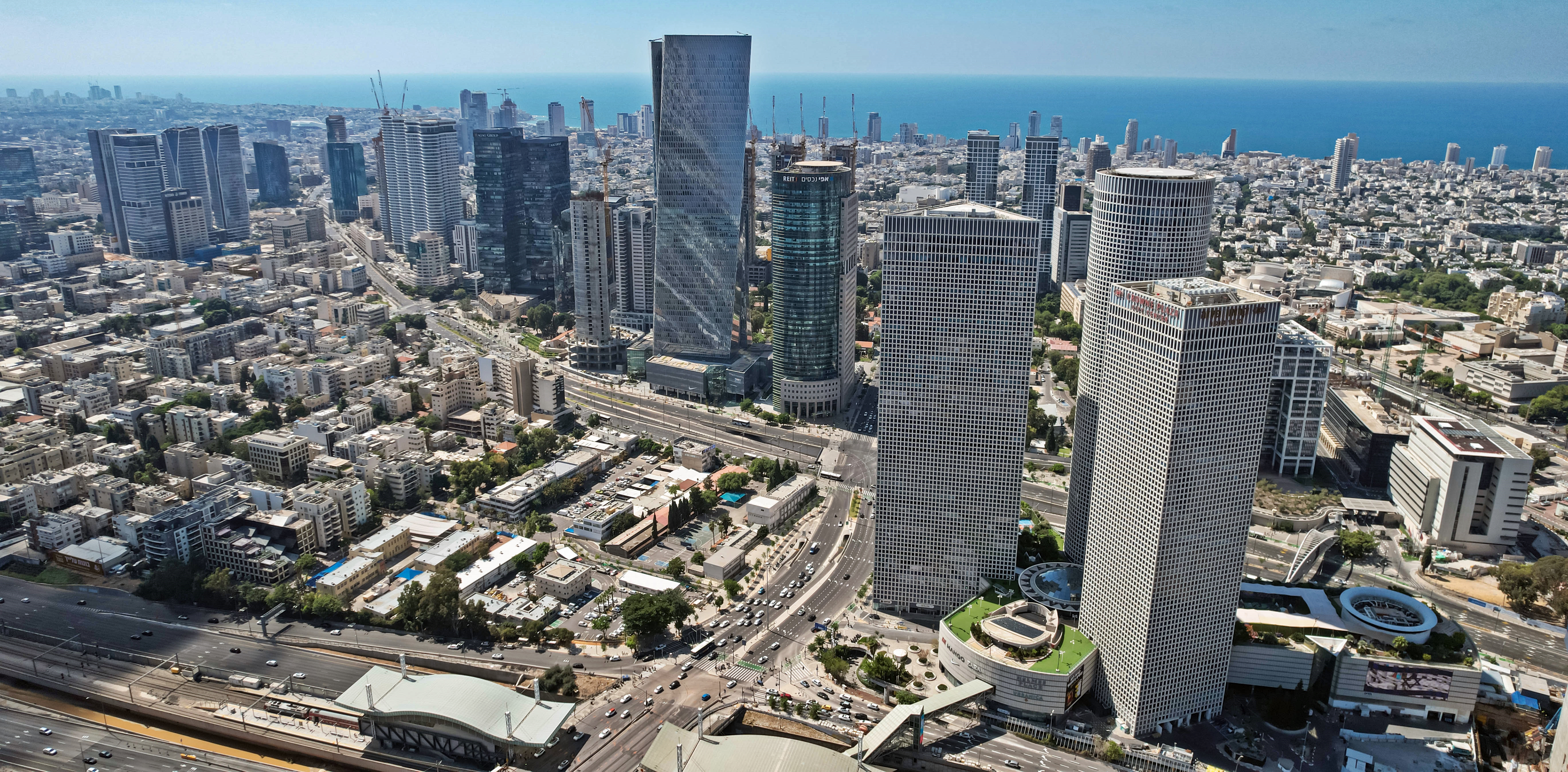
- Skyline of Tel Aviv
- Country: Israel
- District: Tel Aviv
- Subdistrict: none
- Largest City: Tel Aviv

Area
  - Total: 95 km^{2} (37 sq mi)

Population (2024)
  - Total: 657,267

Ethnicity
  - Jews and others: 90.9%
  - Arabs: 4.2%

The Tel Aviv Natural Region is a natural region in the Tel Aviv District of Israel. Tel Aviv is the largest city in the natural region.

== Geography ==
Districts, Subdistricts and Natural Regions of the State of Israel, 2018

The natural region consists of the city of Tel Aviv and its immediate northern suburbs of Herzliya and Ramat HaSharon, along with two small towns. It has an area of 95 km^{2}. Tel Aviv, the largest city in the natural region, contains 75 percent of the natural region's population.

== Demographics ==
With a population of 657,267 as of 2024, the Tel Aviv Natural Region is the second-most populous natural region in Israel. The vast majority of the residents of the Tel Aviv Natural Region are Jewish. 4 percent of the population consists of Arabs, who are concentrated in Tel Aviv itself, and specifically the historic Jaffa neighborhood.

Historical population
Year	Pop.	±%
1972	430,100	—
1983	423,000	−1.7%
1995	469,400	+11.0%
2008	530,000	+12.9%
2022	649,807	+22.6%
2024	657,267	+1.1%

== Administrative local authorities ==
Cities	Local Councils	Villages
Herzliya; Ramat HaSharon; Tel Aviv	Kfar Shmaryahu	Hof HaSharon: Glil Yam

== Voting Patterns ==
In the 2022 election, 68 percent of voters in the natural region voted for the parties of the center-left coalition led by Yair Lapid, while 27 percent voted for the parties of the right-wing coalition led by Benjamin Netanyahu and 3 percent voted for the Arab parties.

In the 2026 election, 71 percent of voters in the natural region voted for the parties of the center-left coalition led by Gadi Eisenkot, while 22 percent voted for the parties of the right-wing coalition led by Benjamin Netanyahu and 3 percent voted for the Arab parties. An additional 2.4 percent voted for the Reservists, and 1.2 percent voted for Amcha Yisrael. Voter turnout increased 16 percent from the 2022 election.
