= Ramat Gan Natural Region =

Coordinates: 32°04′16″N 34°49′42″E

- Natural Region
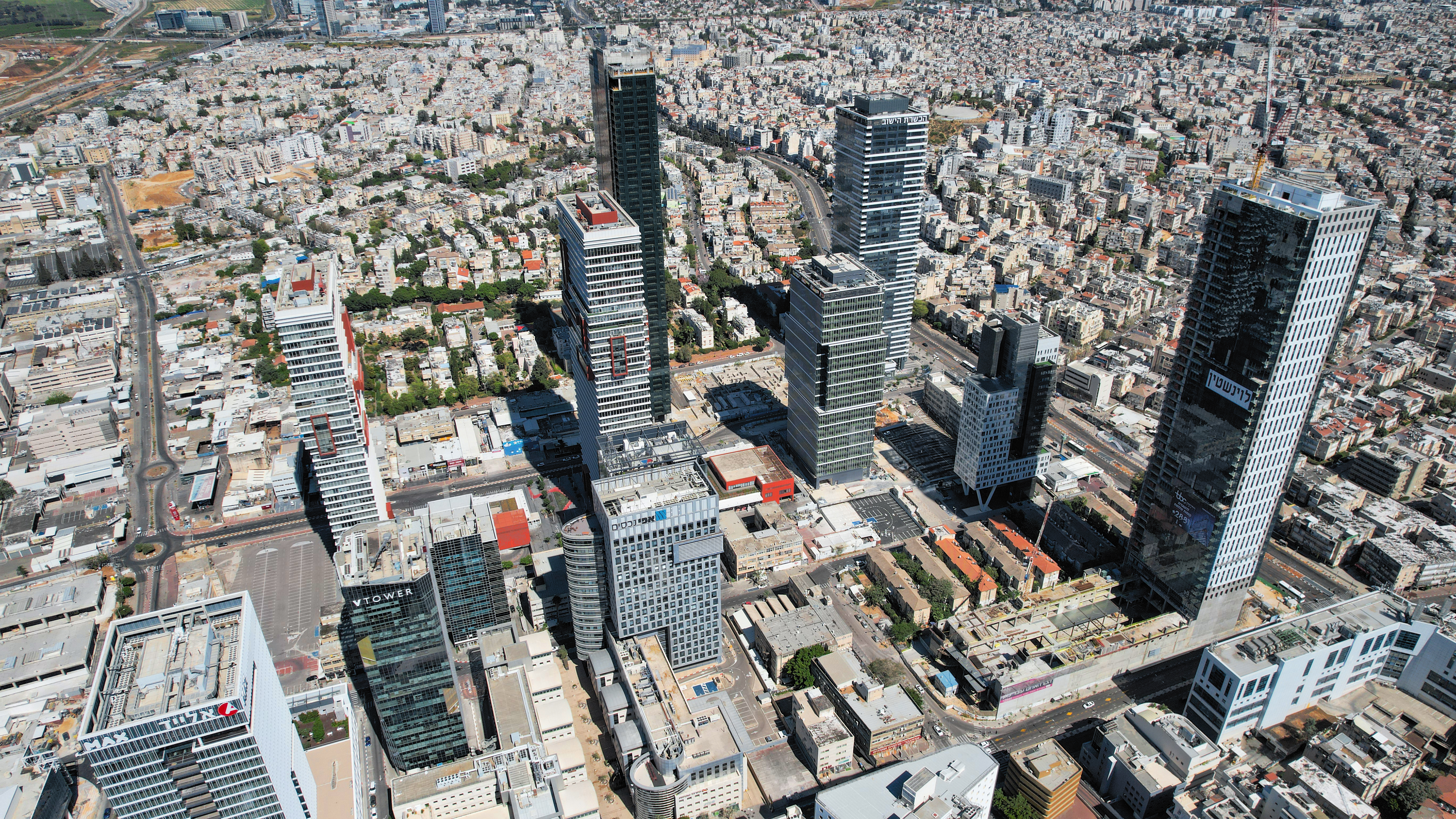
- Skyline of Bnei Brak
- Country: Israel
- District: Tel Aviv
- Subdistrict: none
- Largest City: Bnei Brak

Area
  - Total: 40 km^{2} (15 sq mi)

Population (2024)
  - Total: 547,015

Ethnicity
  - Jews and others: 97.0%
  - Arabs: 0.3%

The Ramat Gan Natural Region is a natural region in the Tel Aviv District of Israel. Bnei Brak is the largest city in the natural region.

== Geography ==
Districts, Subdistricts and Natural Regions of the State of Israel, 2018

The natural region consists of cities and suburban areas immediately to the east of Tel Aviv. It has an area of 40 km^{2}. The largest city in the natural region is Bnei Brak, which contains 42 percent of the natural region's population; Ramat Gan, the namesake of the natural region, is the second-largest city. The natural region contains three other cities: Givatayim, Kiryat Ono, and Or Yehuda.

== Demographics ==
The vast majority of the residents of the Ramat Gan Natural Region are Jewish. There are no Arab towns in the natural region.

Historical population
Year	Pop.	±%
1972	277,900	—
1983	301,800	+8.6%
1995	354,000	+17.3%
2008	411,400	+16.2%
2022	518,463	+26.0%
2024	547,015	+5.5%

== Administrative local authorities ==
Cities	Local Councils	Villages
Bnei Brak; Givatayim; Kiryat Ono; Or Yehuda; Ramat Gan	[None]	[None]

== Voting Patterns ==
In the 2022 election, 57 percent of voters in the natural region voted for the parties of the right-wing coalition led by Benjamin Netanyahu, while 40 percent voted for the parties of the center-left coalition led by Yair Lapid and 0.3 percent voted for the Arab parties.

In the 2026 election, 51 percent of voters in the natural region voted for the parties of the right-wing coalition led by Benjamin Netanyahu, while 44 percent voted for the parties of the center-left coalition led by Gadi Eisenkot and 0.3 percent voted for the Arab parties. An additional 2.4 percent voted for the Reservists, and 1.2 percent voted for Amcha Yisrael. Voter turnout increased 15 percent from the 2022 election.

The natural region is highly polarized politically, as the secular, progressive cities of Ramat Gan and Givatayim vote heavily for center-left political parties, while the Haredi-dominated city of Bnei Brak votes almost unanimously for right-wing political parties.
