= Akko Natural Region =

Coordinates: 32°55′40″N 35°4′54″E

Acre Natural Region
- Natural Region
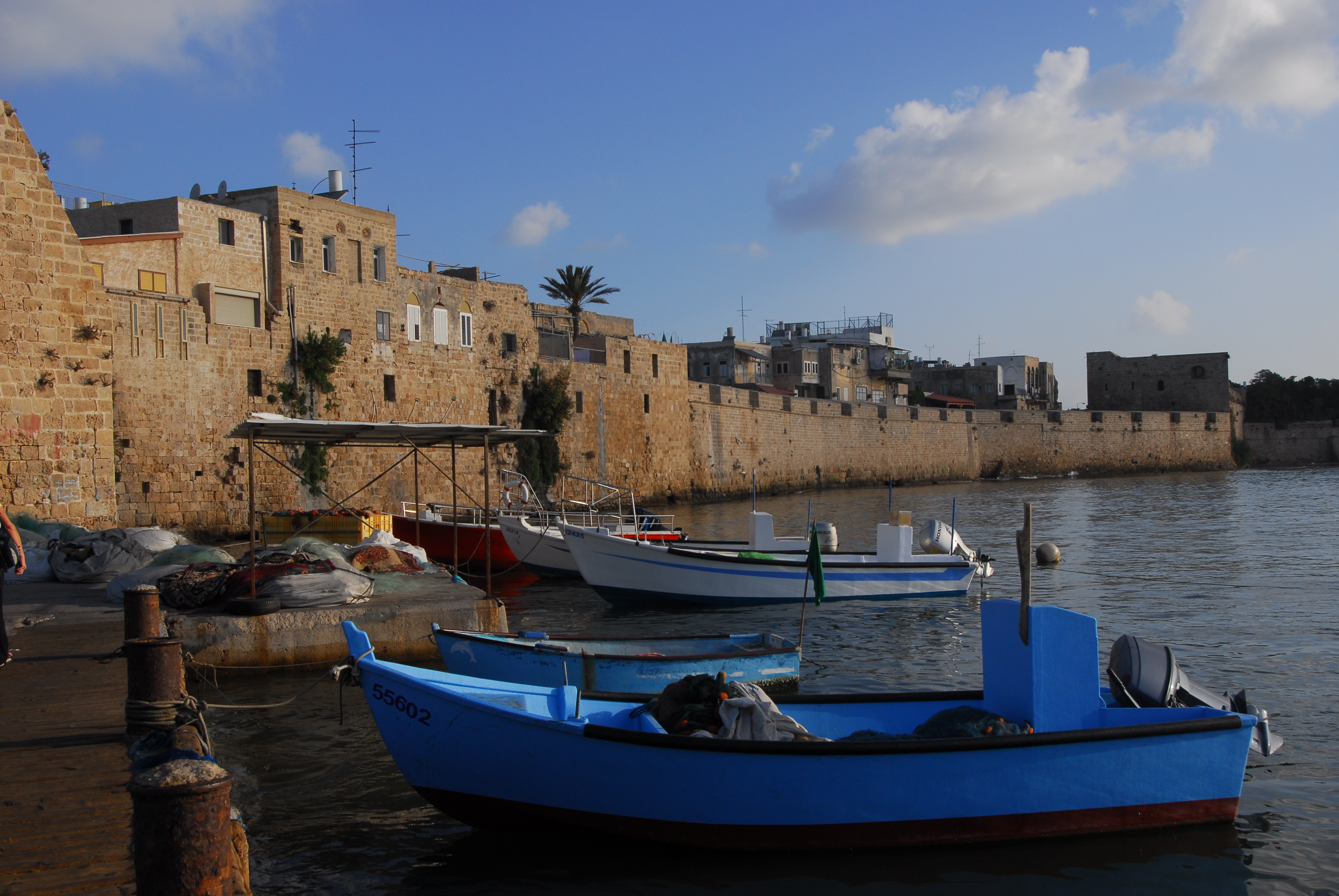
- The fishing port of Acre
- Interactive map of Acre Natural Region
- Country: Israel
- District: Northern
- Subdistrict: Acre
- Largest City: Acre

Area
  - Total: 97 km^{2} (37 sq mi)

Population (2024)
  - Total: 79,406

Ethnicity
  - Jews and others: 50.7%
  - Arabs: 48.5%

The Acre Natural Region, alternatively spelt as Akko Natural Region (based on Hebrew name) or Akka Natural Region (based on Arabic name), is a natural region in the Acre Subdistrict, in the Northern District of Israel. Acre is the largest city in the natural region.

== Geography ==
Districts, Subdistricts and Natural Regions of the State of Israel, 2018

The natural region is located along the Mediterranean coast of northern Israel, south of Nahariya and north of Haifa and its Krayot suburbs. It has an area of 97 km^{2}. Two thirds of the natural region's inhabitants live in Acre. The only other major population center in the natural region is the Arab town of Jadeidi-Makr. It contains a portion of the Mateh Asher Regional Council.

== Demographics ==
The natural region has a slight majority of Jews, with 51 percent of its population being Jewish and 48 percent Arab. The city of Acre itself is roughly 2/3 Jewish, while Jadeidi-Makr is an Arab town, and the seven small villages in the natural region are all Jewish.

Historical population
Year	Pop.	±%
1972	36,000	—
1983	40,000	+11.1%
1995	59,800	+49.5%
2008	68,700	+14.9%
2022	76,474	+11.3%
2024	79,406	+3.8%

== Administrative local authorities ==
Cities	Local Councils	Villages
Acre	Jadeidi-Makr	Matte Asher: Afek; Ahihud; Bustan HaGalil; Ein HaMifratz; Kfar Masaryk; Shomrat; Yas'ur

== Voting Patterns ==
In the 2022 election, 40 percent of voters in the natural region voted for the Arab parties, while 39 percent voted for the parties of the right-wing coalition led by Benjamin Netanyahu and 21 percent voted for the parties of the center-left coalition led by Yair Lapid.

In the 2026 election, 48 percent of voters in the natural region voted for the Arab parties, while 31 percent voted for the parties of the right-wing coalition led by Benjamin Netanyahu and 19 percent voted for the parties of the center-left coalition led by Gadi Eisenkot. An additional 1.2 percent voted for the Reservists, and 0.7 percent voted for Amcha Yisrael. Voter turnout increased 28 percent from the 2022 election.
