= Natural region (Israel) =

Israeli and Israeli occupied administrative subdivisions

Natural Regions of Israel
- Category: Unitary state
- Location: State of Israel
- Number: 52
- Populations: 577 (Southern Negev Mountains) – 1,129,987 (Judean Mountains)
- Areas: 37 km^{2} (14 sq mi) (Holon) – 4,831 km^{2} (1,865 sq mi) (Northern Negev Mountains)
- Government: None
- Subdivisions: City council, Local council, Regional council

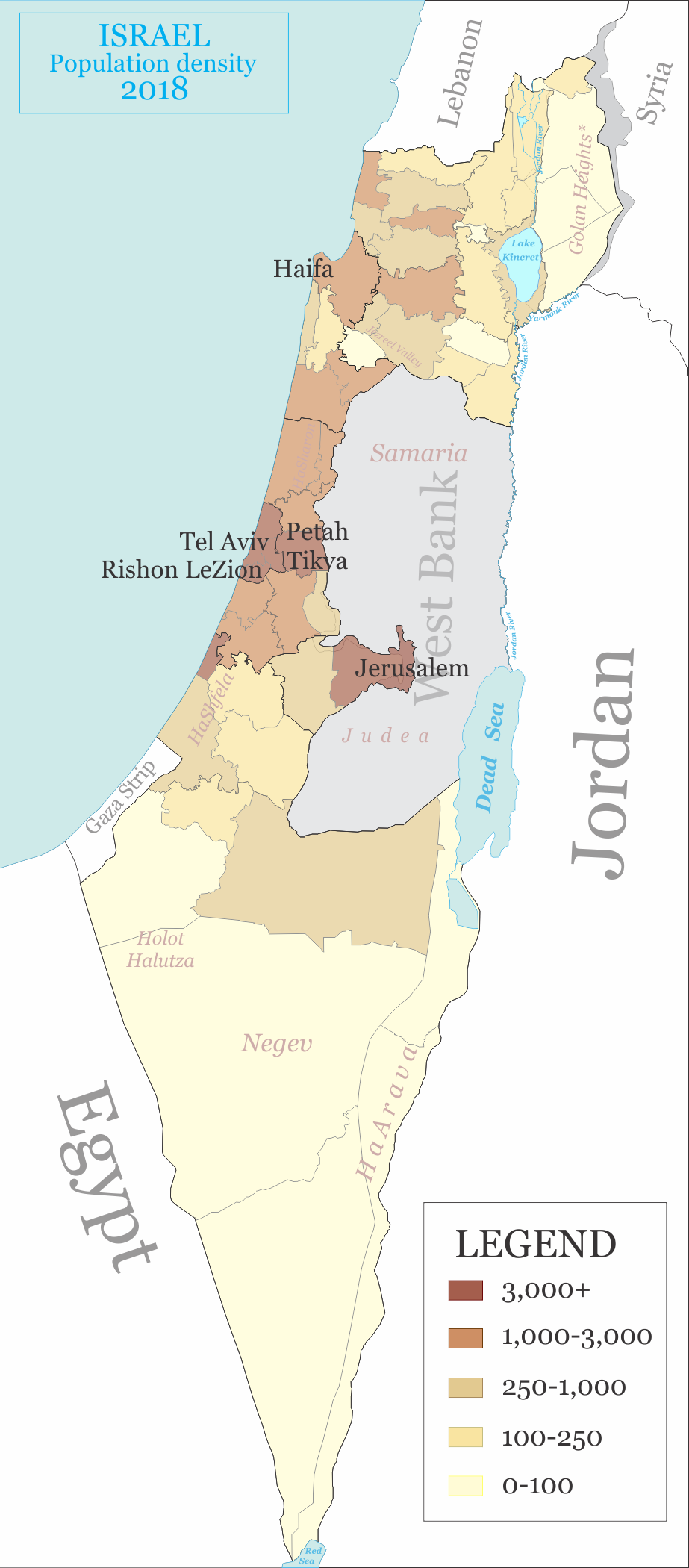
Population density by natural region, subdistrict, and district in 2018 (thicker border indicates higher tier)

The Natural regions of Israel are one of Israel's administrative subdivisions. They are below the level of districts and subdistricts, and above the council-level divisions of cities, municipalities, and regional councils.

There are currently 52 natural regions, as defined by the Israel Central Bureau of Statistics.

== History ==
Natural regions were created in 1953 due to a need to coordinate Israel's existing districts and subdistricts with its geographic regions. They were drawn so that each natural region was contained entirely within a particular subdistrict. When first drawn, there were 34 natural regions; this number increased to 36 in the 1961 census, 40 in the 1972 census, 45 in the 1983 census, 50 in the 1995 census, 51 in the 2008 census, and 52 natural regions currently.

== List of natural regions ==
Natural regions of Israel
| Name and numerical code | | District | Subdistrict | Largest city/town | Population (2024) | Total area (km^{2}) | Localities | | | | |
|---|---|---|---|---|---|---|---|---|---|---|---|
| Name and numerical code | | Petah Tikva | 422 | Central | Population (2024) | Petah Tikva | Localities | Petah Tikva | 540,293 | 160 | 25 |
| Southern Sharon | 421 | Central | Petah Tikva | Kfar Saba | 298,061 | 124 | 30 | | | | |
| Eastern Sharon | 412 | Central | HaSharon | Tayibe | 124,922 | 87 | 15 | | | | |
| Western Sharon | 411 | Central | HaSharon | Netanya | 391,559 | 261 | 72 | | | | |
| Modi'in | 431 | Central | Ramla | Modi'in-Maccabim-Re'ut | 109,131 | 114 | 9 | | | | |
| Ramla | 432 | Central | Ramla | Lod | 296,753 | 225 | 44 | | | | |
| Rehovot | 441 | Central | Rehovot | Rehovot | 336,065 | 207 | 37 | | | | |
| Rishon LeZion | 442 | Central | Rehovot | Rishon LeZion | 312,680 | 117 | 11 | | | | |
| Alexander Mountain | 323 | Haifa | Hadera | Umm al-Fahm | 180,516 | 126 | 15 | | | | |
| Hadera | 324 | Haifa | Hadera | Hadera | 279,015 | 235 | 29 | | | | |
| Zikhron Ya'akov | 322 | Haifa | Hadera | Zikhron Ya'akov | 29,467 | 138 | 10 | | | | |
| Karmel Coast | 321 | Haifa | Hadera | Fureidis | 36,200 | 74 | 15 | | | | |
| Haifa | 311 | Haifa | Haifa | Haifa | 634,396 | 294 | 25 | | | | |
| Judean Mountains | 111 | Jerusalem | | Jerusalem | 1,129,987 | 316 | 35 | | | | |
| Judean Foothills | 112 | Jerusalem | | Beit Shemesh | 201,608 | 337 | 36 | | | | |
| Akko | 241 | Northern | Acre | Acre | 79,406 | 97 | 9 | | | | |
| Elon | 244 | Northern | Acre | Hurfeish | 23,282 | 134 | 24 | | | | |
| Karmi'el | 242 | Northern | Acre | Karmiel | 124,110 | 109 | 20 | | | | |
| Nahariyya | 245 | Northern | Acre | Nahariya | 119,958 | 101 | 21 | | | | |
| Shefar'am | 241 | Northern | Acre | Shefa-Amr | 237,934 | 249 | 27 | | | | |
| Yehi'am | 243 | Northern | Acre | Ma'alot-Tarshiha | 107,395 | 237 | 30 | | | | |
| Hermon | 291 | Northern | Golan (Note: Occupied in the 1967 Six-Day War and annexed by Israel's Golan Heights Law, which has only been recognized internationally by the United States and Colombia.) | Majdal Shams | 13,960 | 99 | 4 | | | | |
| Middle Golan | 293 | Northern | Golan | Katzrin | 13,150 | 294 | 8 | | | | |
| Northern Golan | 292 | Northern | Golan | Buq'ata | 19,056 | 479 | 13 | | | | |
| Southern Golan | 294 | Northern | Golan | Haspin | 11,445 | 281 | 14 | | | | |
| Eastern Lower Galilee | 222 | Northern | Kinneret | Maghar | 53,348 | 335 | 22 | | | | |
| Kinerot | 221 | Northern | Kinneret | Tiberias | 72,206 | 194 | 24 | | | | |
| Bet She'an | 231 | Northern | Jezreel | Beit She'an | 36,881 | 217 | 25 | | | | |
| Harod Valley | 232 | Northern | Jezreel | Gan Ner | 12,631 | 106 | 12 | | | | |
| Kokhav Plateau | 233 | Northern | Jezreel | Kafr Misr | 15,262 | 154 | 9 | | | | |
| Menashe Plateau | 236 | Northern | Jezreel | Ramot Menashe | 6,701 | 102 | 7 | | | | |
| Nazareth-Tir'an Mountains | 237 | Northern | Jezreel | Nazareth | 356,856 | 256 | 37 | | | | |
| Yizre'el Valley | 234 | Northern | Jezreel | Afula | 103,799 | 297 | 39 | | | | |
| Yokneam | 235 | Northern | Jezreel | Yokneam Illit | 39,268 | 62 | 9 | | | | |
| Central Lower Galilee | 214 | Northern | Safed | Tefahot | 2,057 | | 5 | | | | |
| Eastern Upper Galilee | 212 | Northern | Safed | Safed | 59,264 | 334 | 28 | | | | |
| Hazor | 213 | Northern | Safed | Hatzor HaGlilit | 27,529 | 102 | 12 | | | | |
| Hula Valley | 211 | Northern | Safed | Kiryat Shmona | 46,202 | 234 | 23 | | | | |
| Ashdod | 613 | Southern | Ashkelon | Ashdod | 228,562 | 53 | 1 | | | | |
| Ashkelon | 614 | Southern | Ashkelon | Ashkelon | 234,785 | 408 | 35 | | | | |
| Lakhish | 612 | Southern | Ashkelon | Kiryat Gat | 94,037 | 484 | 27 | | | | |
| Mal'akhi | 611 | Southern | Ashkelon | Kiryat Malakhi | 71,300 | 322 | 45 | | | | |
| Arava | 625 | Southern | Beersheba | Eilat | 67,489 | 1,123 | 19 | | | | |
| Be'er Sheva | 623 | Southern | Beersheba | Beersheba | 527,255 (Note: This statistic is incomplete, as it does not include Bedouins who lived in unrecognized villages.) | 2,002 | 33 | | | | |
| Besor | 622 | Southern | Beersheba | Ofakim | 68,766 | 1,081 | 42 | | | | |
| Dead Sea | 624 | Southern | Beersheba | Ein Gedi | 1,775 | 634 | 4 | | | | |
| Gerar | 621 | Southern | Beersheba | Netivot | 80,268 | 310 | 31 | | | | |
| Northern Negev Mountains | 626 | Southern | Beersheba | Dimona | 69,445 | 4,831 | 20 | | | | |
| Southern Negev Mountains | 627 | Southern | Beersheba | Ne'ot Smadar | 577 | 2,937 | 4 | | | | |
| Tel Aviv | 511 | Tel Aviv | | Tel Aviv | 657,267 | 95 | 5 | | | | |
| Holon | 513 | Tel Aviv | | Holon | 334,814 | 37 | 4 | | | | |
| Ramat Gan | 512 | Tel Aviv | | Bnei Brak | 547,015 | 40 | 5 | | | | |

== See also ==
- Districts of Israel
