= Demographics of Israel =

Demographics of Israel (including Israelis in West Bank)
- Population pyramid of Israel, 2023 (numbers by age group)
- Population: 9,842,000 (ca. 93rd)
  - Year: December 2023
  - Source: Israeli CBS
- Density: 431/km^{2} (30th)
- Growth rate: 1.9%
- Birth rate: 21.5 births/1,000 (101st)
- Death rate: 5.2 deaths/1,000 population (174th)
- Life expectancy: 82.7 years (8th)
  - male: 80.7 years
  - female: 84.6 years
- Fertility rate: 3.01 children born/woman (59th)
- Infant mortality: 4.03 deaths/1,000 live births (25th)

Age structure
- 0–14 years: 28%
- 15–64 years: 60%
- 65 and over: 12%

Sex ratio
- Total: 1.01 males/female
- At birth: 1.05 males/female
- Under 15: 1.05 males/female
- 15–64 years: 1.03 males/female
- 65 and over: 0.78 males/female

Nationality
- Nationality: Israelis
- Major ethnic: Jews (7,208,000, 73.2%); Mizrahim (N/D); Ashkenazim (N/D); Sephardim (N/D); Other Jews (N/D)
- Minor ethnic: Arabs (2,080,000, 21.1%); Arab Muslims (N/D); Arab Christians (N/D); Other Arabs (N/D); Other (non-Jewish, non-Arab) 554,000 (5.7%)

Language
- Official: Hebrew
- Spoken: Arabic, Yiddish and Ladino

The demographics of Israel, monitored by the Israel Central Bureau of Statistics, encompass various attributes that define the nation's populace. Since its establishment in 1948, Israel has witnessed significant changes in its demographics. Formed as a homeland for the Jewish people, Israel has attracted Jewish immigrants from Europe, Asia, Africa, and the Americas.

The Israel Central Bureau of Statistics defines the population of Israel as including Jews living in all of the West Bank and Palestinians in East Jerusalem but excluding Palestinians anywhere in the rest of the West Bank, the Gaza Strip, and foreign workers anywhere in Israel. As of December 2023, this calculation stands at approximately 9,842,000 of whom:

- 73.2% (about 7,208,000 people) are Jews, including about 503,000 living outside the self-defined borders of the State of Israel in the West Bank
- 21.1% (around 2,080,000 people) are Israeli citizens classified as Arab, some identifying as Palestinian, and including Druze, Circassians, all other Muslims, Christian Arabs, Armenians (which Israel considers "Arab")
- An additional 5.7% (roughly 554,000 people) are classified as "others". This diverse group comprises those with Jewish ancestry but not recognized as Jewish by religious law, non-Jewish family members of Jewish immigrants, Christians other than Arabs and Armenians, and residents without a distinct ethnic or religious categorization.

Israel's annual population growth rate stood at 2.0% in 2015, more than three times faster than the OECD average of around 0.6%. With an average of three children per woman, Israel also has the highest fertility rate in the OECD by a considerable margin and much higher than the OECD average of 1.7.

== Definitions ==
The definition of what constitutes the population of Israel varies depending on which territories are counted and which population groups are counted in each territory.

The Israel Central Bureau of Statistics (CBS) definition of the Area of the State of Israel:

- includes East Jerusalem since 1967, which Israel unilaterally annexed
- includes the Golan Heights since 1982, which Israel unilaterally annexed
- excludes the West Bank other than East Jerusalem

The CBS' definition of the Population of Israel, however:

- includes non-Israeli Palestinians (as well as Israeli Arabs/Palestinians) in East Jerusalem who have permission to live there
- includes Israeli settlers and others with Israeli residency permits living in the Area C of West Bank
- excludes Palestinian/Arab/other residents of Area C and East Jerusalem who do not have Israeli citizenship or residence
- excludes persons who are not registered (from 2008 on) and/or entered illegally, and foreign workers.

== Population ==
Israeli population growth since 1949

Historical population
Year	Pop.	±% p.a.
1950	1,370,100	—
1960	2,150,400	+4.61%
1970	3,022,100	+3.46%
1980	3,921,700	+2.64%
1990	4,821,700	+2.09%
2000	6,369,300	+2.82%
2010	7,695,100	+1.91%
2019	9,098,700	+1.88%
2023	9,727,000	+1.68%
Source: (2019 data)

=== Total population ===
10,270,500 (most current update from the Israeli Central Bureau for Statistics, via live feed)

Note: includes over 200,000 Israelis and 250,000 Arabs in East Jerusalem, about 421,400 Jewish settlers on the West Bank, and about 42,000 in the Golan Heights (July 2007 estimate). Does not include Arab populations in the West Bank and Gaza Strip. Does not include 222,000 foreigners living in the country.

Demographics of Israel and its Occupied Territories
Region & Status	By citizenship						Total Population	Year Source	By ethnoreligious group			Area (km^{2})
Region & Status	Israeli citizen		Total Israelis	Year Source	Palestinian non-Israeli- citizens	Year	Total Population	Year Source	Jewish	Arab	Other	Area (km^{2})
Region & Status	Jews and Other	Arab citizens of Israel	Total Israelis	Year Source	Palestinian non-Israeli- citizens	Year	Total Population	Year Source	Jewish	Arab	Other	Area (km^{2})
Green Line De facto 1949–1967 borders	6,971,191	1,689,018	8,660,209	2021/ -3/-4	0		8,660,209	2021/ -3/-4	6,422,761; 74%	1,689,018; 20%	554,000; 6%	20,582
Golan Heights Per Israel: annexed Per UN: Occupied Syrian territory	27,000	26,000	53,000; Jews 27,000; Druze 24,000; Alawite 2,000	2021	0	2021	53,000	2021	27,000	26,000	0	1,154
East Jerusalem Per Israel: Annexed; Per UN: Occupied Palestinian territory	240,832	~18,982	259,814	2021	351,570	2021	611,384	2021	240,832	370,552 of which Arab citizens of Israel ~18,982	0	336
Area of the State of Israel as per CBS definition												22,072
West Bank Area C (Full Israeli control) Israelis	517,407	0	517,407	1/2024	not counted in population of Israel	2019	517,407	1/2024	517,407	not counted in population of Israel	0	200
Population of Israel as per CBS definition	7,756,430	1,734,000	9,490,430		~351,570; East Jerusalem; Palestinians		9,842,000	2023	7,208,000	2,080,000; PCI* 1,734,000; Non-PCI ~346,000	554,000	25,650
Area C Palestinians	counted in row above	0	counted in row above		300,000	2019	300,000	2019		300,000	0	
West Bank Areas A & B (Under Palestinian civil administration)			0		2,464,566	2023	2,464,566	2023	0	2,464,566	0	2,808
Gaza Strip (Under partial Palestinian administration)			0		2,226,544	mid- 2023	2,226,544	mid- 2023	0	2,226,544	0	365
Israel and Israeli-occupied territories							14,833,110	Sum	7,208,000; 48.6%	7,071,000; 47.7% Arab citizens of Israel: 1,734,000 11.7%, Palestinian non-citizen: 5,337,110 36.0%	554,000; 3.7%	28,823

=== Density ===
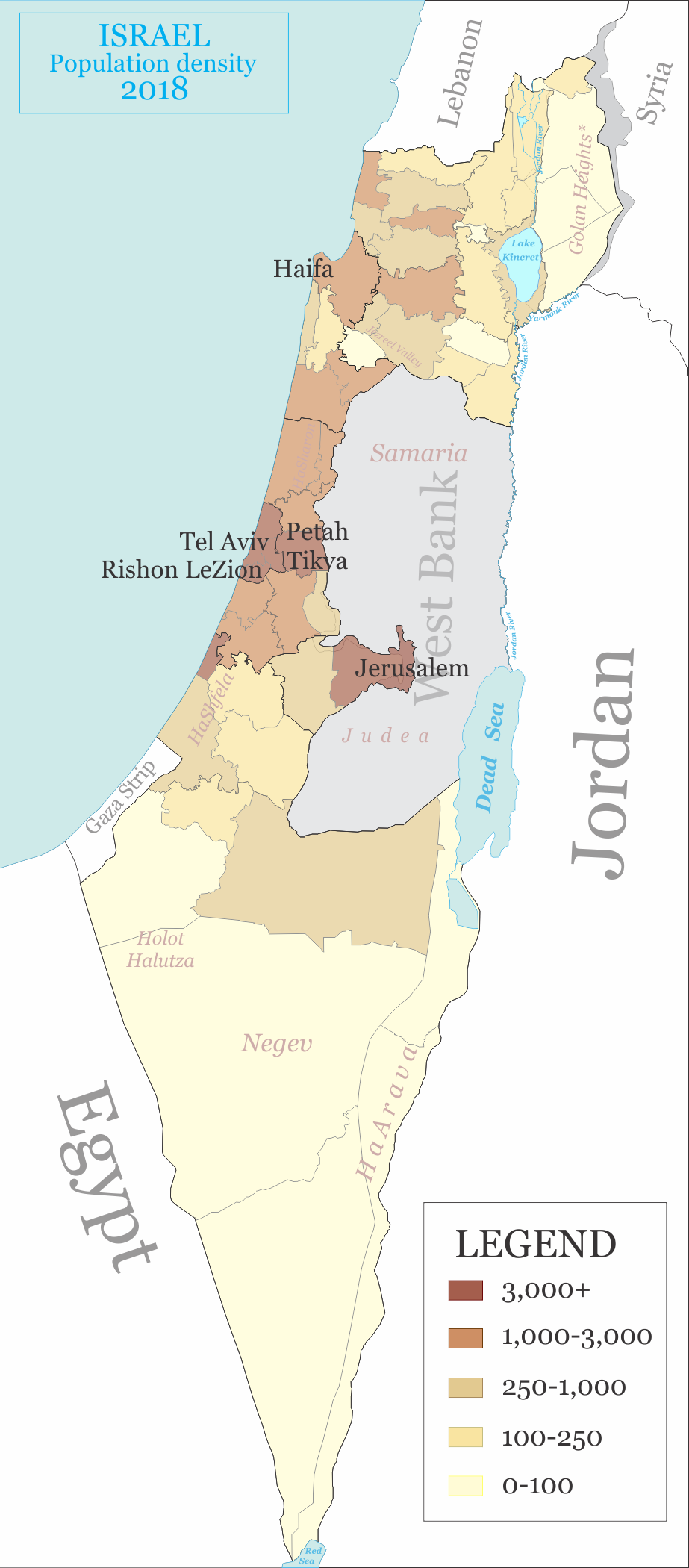
Population density per square kilometer, by district, sub-district and geographical area

Geographic deployment, as of 2024:

- Central District: 24.1% (2,409,464)
- Tel Aviv District: 15.4% (1,539,096)
- Northern District: 15.8% (1,581,700)
- Southern District: 14.5% (1,444,259)
- Haifa District: 11.6% (1,159,594)
- Jerusalem District: 13.3% (1,331,595)
- Judea and Samaria Area (West Bank) (Israelis only): 5.2% (514,496)

=== Population growth rate ===
- 2.0% (2016)

During the 1990s, the Jewish population growth rate was about 3% per year, as a result of massive immigration to Israel, primarily from the republics of the former Soviet Union. There is also a very high population growth rate among certain Jewish groups, especially adherents of Orthodox Judaism. The growth rate of the Arab population in Israel is 2.2%, while the growth rate of the Jewish population in Israel is 1.8%. The growth rate of the Arab population has slowed from 3.8% in 1999 to 2.2% in 2013, and for the Jewish population, the growth rate declined from 2.7% to its lowest rate of 1.4% in 2005. Due to a rise in fertility of the Jewish population since 1995 and immigration, the growth rate has since risen to 1.8%.

=== Fertility ===
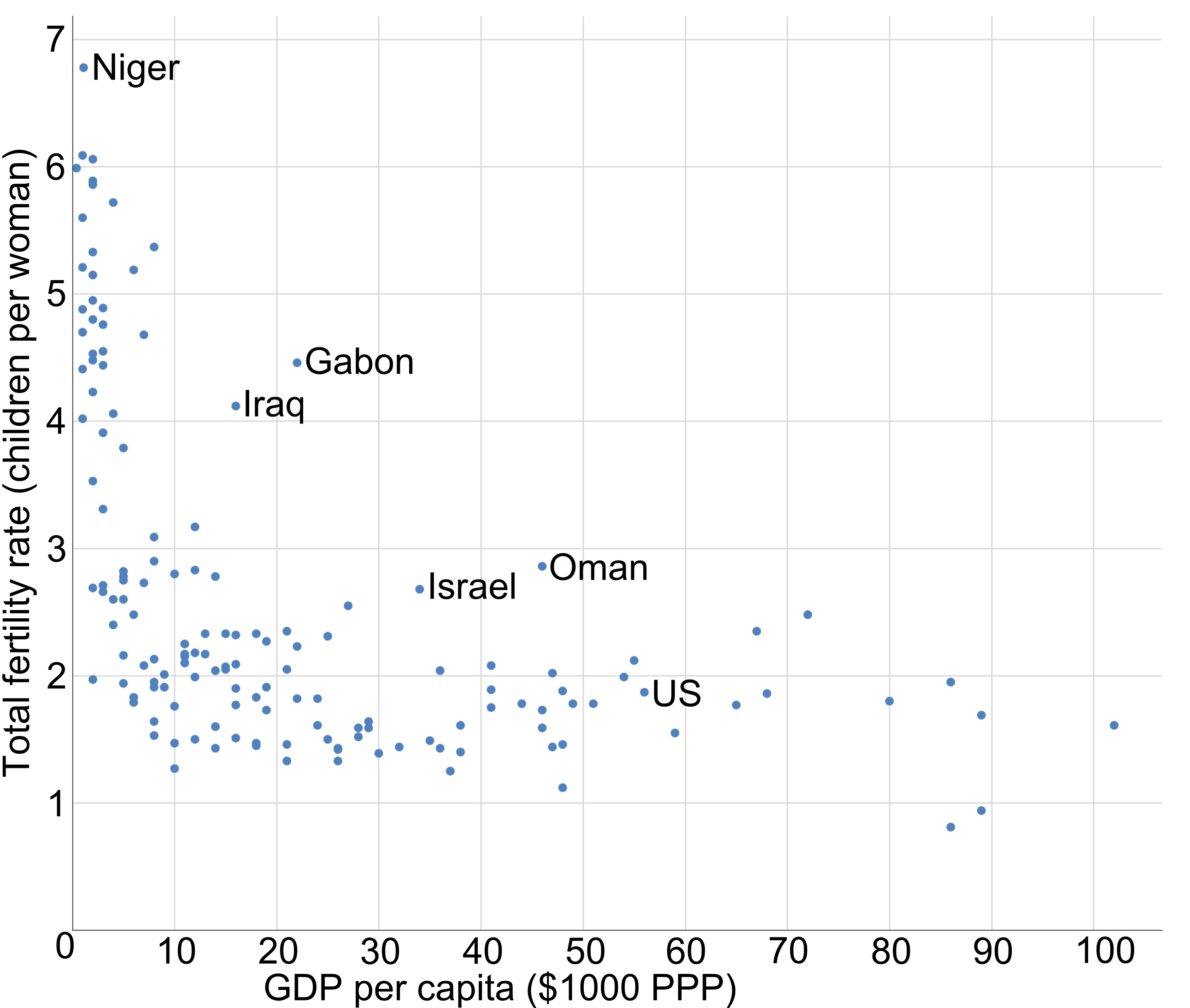
Graph of Total Fertility Rate vs. GDP (PPP) per capita of each country, including Israel.

The total fertility rate (TFR) of a population is the average number of children that an average woman would have, in her lifetime.

- 3.01 children born/woman (2019)

Jewish total fertility rate increased by 10.2% during 1998–2009, and was recorded at 2.90 during 2009. During the same time period, Arab TFR decreased by 20.5%. Muslim TFR was measured at 3.73 for 2009, and 2.9 for 2022.

In 2000, the Jewish and Arab TFRs in Jerusalem were 3.79 and 4.43 respectively. By 2009, the Jewish TFR in Jerusalem was measured higher than the Arab TFR (2010: 4.26 vs 3.85, 2009: 4.16 vs 3.87). As of 2021, the Jewish and Arab TFRs in Jerusalem were 4.4 and 3.1 respectively. TFR for Arab residents in the West Bank was measured at 2.91 in 2013, while that for the Jewish residents was reported at 5.10 children per woman.

The ethnic group with highest recorded TFR is the Bedouin of Negev. Their TFR was reported at 10.06 in 1998, and 5.73 in 2009. TFR is also very high among Haredi Jews. For Ashkenazi Haredim, the TFR rose from 6.91 in 1980 to 8.51 in 1996. The figure for 2008 is estimated to be even higher. TFR for Sephardi/Mizrahi Haredim rose from 4.57 in 1980 to 6.57 in 1996. In 2020 the overall Jewish TFR in Israel (3.00) was for the first time measured higher than Arab Muslim TFR (2.99).

As of 2022, the fertility rates in Israeli cities dominated by specific demographic groups were: Haredi 6.1, Bedouin 4.4, Jewish non-Haredi 2.4, Arab 2.2, Druze 1.8.

Year	Jews	Muslims	Christians	Druze	Others	Total
2000	2.66	4.74	2.55	3.07		2.95
2001	2.59	4.71	2.46	3.02		2.89
2002	2.64	4.58	2.29	2.77		2.89
2003	2.73	4.50	2.31	2.85		2.95
2004	2.71	4.36	2.13	2.66	1.47	2.90
2005	2.69	4.03	2.15	2.59	1.49	2.84
2006	2.75	3.97	2.14	2.64	1.55	2.88
2007	2.80	3.90	2.13	2.49	1.49	2.90
2008	2.88	3.84	2.11	2.49	1.57	2.96
2009	2.90	3.73	2.15	2.49	1.56	2.96
2010	2.97	3.75	2.14	2.48	1.64	3.03
2011	2.98	3.51	2.19	2.33	1.75	3.00
2012	3.04	3.54	2.17	2.26	1.68	3.05
2013	3.05	3.35	2.13	2.21	1.68	3.03
2014	3.11	3.35	2.27	2.20	1.72	3.08
2015	3.13	3.32	2.12	2.19	1.72	3.09
2016	3.16	3.29	2.05	2.21	1.64	3.11
2017	3.16	3.37	1.93	2.10	1.58	3.11
2018	3.17	3.20	2.06	2.16	1.54	3.09
2019	3.09	3.16	1.80	2.02	1.45	3.01
2020	3.00	2.99	1.85	1.94	1.35	2.90
2021	3.13	3.01	1.77	2.00	1.39	3.00
2022	3.03	2.91	1.68	1.85	1.26	2.89
2023	3.01	2.85	1.65	1.75	1.20	2.85
2024	3.06	2.75	1.61	1.66	1.13	2.87
2025	3.08	2.76	1.62	1.69	1.14	2.89
Year	Jews	Muslims	Christians	Druze	Others	Total

According to the CBS, 66,753 births were recorded to Jewish mothers in Israel during the first six months of 2026, compared with 65,091 during the same period in 2025, an increase of 2.6%. In the 12 months ending in June 2026, there were 137,343 births to Jewish mothers. According to a report by The Algemeiner, Israel has been the only OECD country to maintain a fertility rate above the replacement level in recent years.

==== Birth rate ====
TFR of Israel to 2016

2021 :

- Total: 19.7 births/1,000 population
- Jews and others: 19.1 births/1,000 population
- Muslims: 23.4 births/1,000 population
- Christians: 13.3 births/1,000 population
- Druze: 15.8 births/1,000 population

Births, in absolute numbers, by mother's religion

Birth rates of various Israeli peoples
Year	Jewish		Muslim		Christian		Druze		others		Total
Year	#	%	#	%	#	%	#	%	#	%	Total
1996	83,710	69.0%	30,802	25.4%	2,678	2.2%	2,682	2.2%	1,461	1.2%	121,333
2000	91,936	67.4%	35,740	26.2%	2,789	2.0%	2,708	2.0%	3,217	2.4%	136,390
2005	100,657	69.9%	34,217	23.8%	2,487	1.7%	2,533	1.8%	4,019	2.8%	143,913
2006	104,513	70.5%	34,337	23.2%	2,500	1.7%	2,601	1.8%	4,219	2.9%	148,170
2007	107,986	71.2%	34,572	22.8%	2,521	1.7%	2,510	1.7%	4,090	2.7%	151,679
2008	112,803	71.9%	34,860	22.2%	2,511	1.6%	2,534	1.6%	4,215	2.7%	156,923
2009	116,599	72.4%	35,253	21.9%	2,514	1.6%	2,517	1.6%	4,159	2.6%	161,042
2010	120,673	72.58%	36,221	21.79%	2,511	1.51%	2,535	1.52%	4,306	2.59%	166,255
2011	121,520	73.07%	35,247	21.19%	2,596	1.56%	2,469	1.48%	4,457	2.68%	166,296
2012	125,409	73.36%	36,041	21.08%	2,610	1.53%	2,371	1.39%	4,492	2.63%	170,940
2013	126,999	74.07%	34,927	20.37%	2,602	1.52%	2,350	1.37%	4,561	2.66%	171,444
2014	130,576	74.01%	35,965	20.38%	2,814	1.59%	2,366	1.34%	4,697	2.66%	176,427
2015	132,220	73.98%	36,659	20.51%	2,669	1.49%	2,376	1.33%	4,792	2.68%	178,723
2016	134,100	73.92%	37,592	20.72%	2,613	1.44%	2,446	1.35%	4,652	2.56%	181,405
2017	134,630	73.31%	39,550	21.53%	2,504	1.36%	2,350	1.28%	4,609	2.51%	183,648
2018	135,809	73.66%	38,757	21.02%	2,721	1.47%	2,434	1.32%	4,639	2.52%	184,370
2019	133,243	73.20%	39,525	21.71%	2,409	1.32%	2,298	1.26%	4,532	2.49%	182,016
2020	129,884	73.25%	38,388	21.65%	2,497	1.41%	2,239	1.26%	4,290	2.42%	177,307
2021	136,120	73.56%	39,703	21.46%	2,434	1.32%	2,339	1.26%	4,432	2.39%	185,040
2022	132,753	73.27%	39,685	21.90%	2,343	1.29%	2,186	1.21%	4,219	2.33%	181,193
2023	131,143	73.38%	39,303	21.99%	2,193	1.23%	2,088	1.17%	3,997	2.24%	178,724
2024	134,458	74.04%	39,398	21.69%	2,134	1.18%	1,993	1.10%	3,631	2.00%	181,614
2025	135,681	73.87%	40,439	22.02%	2,113	1.15%	2,030	1.11%	3,415	1.86%	183,678

Births by mother's religion in January–August
	Jewish		Muslim		Christian		Druze		others		total
	#	%	#	%	#	%	#	%	#	%	total
2025	88,134	73.72%	26,402	22.08%	1,376	1.15%	1,368	1.14%	2,271	1.90%	119,551
2026	90,125	74.39%	26,237	21.66%	1,377	1.14%	1,321	1.09%	2,096	1.73%	121,156

Between the mid-1980s and 2000, the fertility rate in the Muslim sector was stable at 4.6–4.7 children per woman; after 2001, a gradual decline became evident, reaching 3.51 children per woman in 2011. By point of comparison, in 2011, there was a rising fertility rate of 2.98 children among the Jewish population.

==== Before 1950 ====
Years	1925	1926	1927	1928	1929	1930	1931	1932	1933	1934
Total Fertility Rate in Israel	4.38	4.39	4.40	4.41	4.41	4.42	4.36	4.30	4.25	4.19

Years	1935	1936	1937	1938	1939	1940	1941	1942	1943	1944
Total Fertility Rate in Israel	4.13	3.93	3.74	3.54	3.34	3.15	3.32	3.49	3.66	3.84

Years	1945	1946	1947	1948	1949
Total Fertility Rate in Israel	4.01	4.11	4.21	4.32	4.42

=== Life expectancy ===
Life expectancy in Israel since 1950

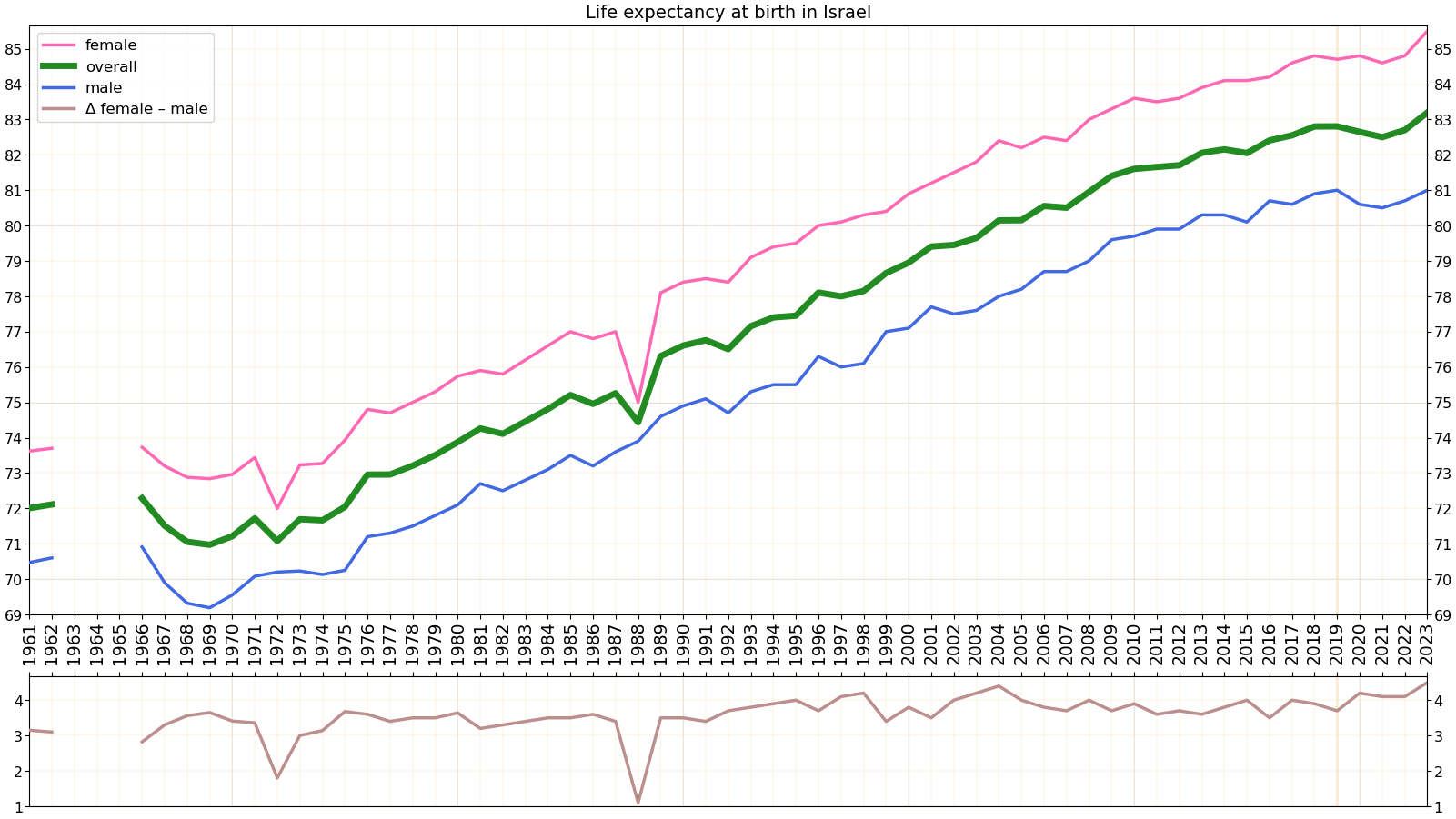
Life expectancy in Israel since 1961 by gender

As of 2019:

- Total population: 82.8 years
- Male: 81 years
- Female: 84.7 years

Average life expectancy at age 0 of the total population.
Period	Life expectancy	Period	Life expectancy
1950–1955	68.9	1985–1990	75.9
1955–1960	70.0	1990–1995	77.2
1960–1965	71.0	1995–2000	78.3
1965–1970	71.8	2000–2005	79.6
1970–1975	72.6	2005–2010	80.9
1975–1980	73.5	2010–2015	81.9
1980–1985	74.6		

==== Infant mortality rate ====
- Total: 4.03 deaths/1,000 live births
- Male: 4.20 deaths/1,000 live births
- Female: 3.84 deaths/1,000 live births (2013 est.)

=== Age structure ===
The table shows population estimates by sex and age group, as of July 1, 2019. It includes data for East Jerusalem and Israeli residents in certain other territories under occupation by Israeli military forces since June 1967. Data refer to Israeli citizens and permanent residents who are listed in the Population Register.

Age group	Male	Female	Total	%
Total	4,494,051	4,559,975	9,054,026	100%
0–4	469 807	444 266	914 073	10.10%
5–9	441 977	419 861	861 838	9.52%
10–14	396 165	376 914	773 079	8.54%
15–19	365 754	349 118	714 872	7.90%
20–24	331 474	319 040	650 514	7.18%
25–29	312 165	304 844	617 009	6.81%
30–34	299 747	298 768	598 515	6.61%
35–39	289 123	292 026	581 149	6.42%
40–44	277 424	282 277	559 701	6.18%
45–49	251 526	257 539	509 065	5.62%
50–54	210 803	217 399	428 202	4.73%
55–59	191 364	204 826	396 191	4.38%
60–64	178 062	196 878	374 940	4.14%
65–69	166 374	188 225	354 598	3.92%
70–74	131 622	154 117	285 739	3.16%
75–79	73 046	91 752	164 798	1.82%
80–84	58 830	81 606	140 436	1.55%
85–89	31 038	48 194	79 233	0.88%
90–94	12 882	23 779	36 661	0.40%
95–99	3 434	6 783	10 216	0.11%
100+	1 432	1 765	3 197	0.04%
Age group	Male	Female	Total	Percent
0–14	1,307,949	1,241,041	2,548,990	28.15%
15–64	2,707,444	2,722,713	5,430,157	59.98%
65+	478 658	596 221	1,074,879	11.87%

Population by Age Group (2010 est.)
Group	0–14 years	15–64 years	65+ years
Total	28.0%	62.1%	9.9%
Jews	25.5%	63.1%	11.4%
Arabs	37.5%	58.6%	3.9%

==== Median age ====
Overall	Jewish	Arabs
29.7	31.6	21.1

The Jewish median age in Jerusalem district and the West Bank are 24.9 and 19.7, respectively, and both account for 16% of the Jewish population, but 24% of 0- to 4-year-olds. The lowest median age in Israel, and one of the lowest in the world, is found in two of the West Bank's biggest Jewish cities: Modi'in Illit (11), Beitar Illit (11) followed by Bedouin towns in the Negev (15.2).

=== Cities ===
Within Israel's system of local government, an urban municipality can be granted a city council by the Israeli Interior Ministry when its population exceeds 20,000. The term "city" does not generally refer to local councils or urban agglomerations, even though a defined city often contains only a small portion of an urban area or metropolitan area's population.

Largest cities in Israel Israel Central Bureau of Statistics
Rank	Name	District	Pop.	Rank	Name	District	Pop.
1	Jerusalem	Jerusalem	1,050,153^{a}	11	Beit Shemesh	Jerusalem	176,786
2	Tel Aviv	Tel Aviv	494,900	12	Ramat Gan	Tel Aviv	172,242
3	Haifa	Haifa	297,082	13	Ashkelon	Southern	166,864
4	Petah Tikva	Central	270,403	14	Rehovot	Central	155,049
5	Rishon LeZion	Central	259,275	15	Bat Yam	Tel Aviv	129,494
6	Netanya	Central	234,813	16	Herzliya	Tel Aviv	110,884
7	Bnei Brak	Tel Aviv	229,996	17	Hadera	Haifa	107,974
8	Ashdod	Southern	228,562	18	Modi'in	Central	100,052
9	Beersheba	Southern	223,587	19	Kfar Saba	Central	99,410
10	Holon	Tel Aviv	191,829	20	Lod	Central	94,189

^a This number includes East Jerusalem and West Bank areas, which had a total population of 617,580 inhabitants in 2023. Israeli sovereignty over East Jerusalem is internationally unrecognized.

== Ethnic and religious groups ==
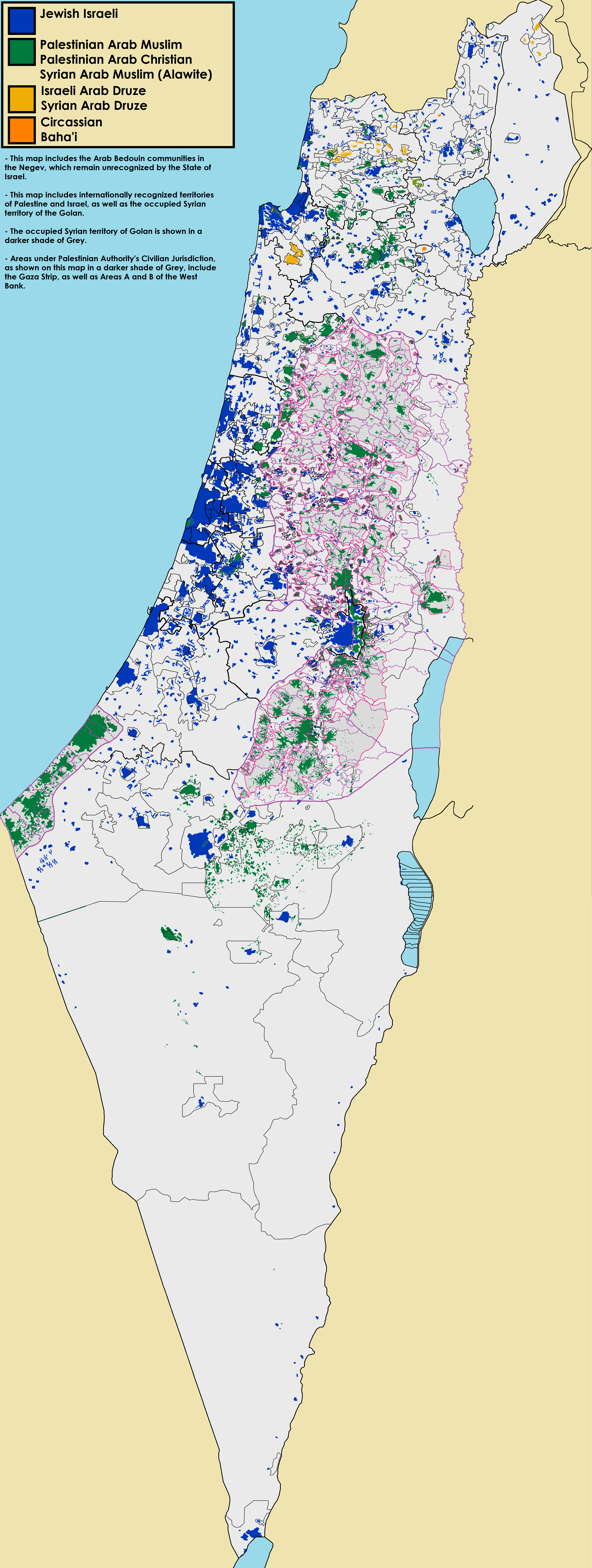
Ethnic map of Israel and Palestine, with the Golan Heights

Population pyramid of Israel by ethnic group in 2021

=== Statistics ===
Population demography (2023)
Group	Population	Proportion of total	Areas included				
Group	Population	Proportion of total	Green Line Israel	Golan Heights	East Jerusalem	Rest of West Bank	Gaza Strip
Jews	7,181,000	73%	yes	yes	yes	yes	n/a
Arabs	2,065,000	21%	yes	yes	yes	no	no
Other	549,000	6%	yes	yes	yes	n/a	n/a
Total	9,795,000	100%	all	all	all	Jews only	no

Population of Arabs and Jews and Others, by natural region (2018) including Jews only in the occupied West Bank
Natural region	Total population	Jews and Others		Arabs	
Natural region	Total population	#	%	#	%
Judean Mountains	1,129,987	660,784	58.5%	415,319	36.8%
Judean Foothills	201,608	196,897	97.7%	497	0.2%
Hula Valley	46,202	43,849	94.9%	1,319	2.9%
Eastern Upper Galilee	59,264	52,028	87.8%	6,144	10.4%
Hazor	27,529	19,598	71.2%	7,316	26.6%
Central Lower Galilee	2,057	2,041	99.2%	1	0.1%
Kinerot	72,206	67,532	93.5%	2,875	4%
Eastern Lower Galilee	53,348	19,967	37.4%	32,808	55.0%
Bet She'an Valley	36,881	35,208	95.5%	293	0.8%
Harod Valley	12,631	10,482	83.0%	1,881	14.9%
Kokhav Plateau	15,262	3,860	25.3%	11,219	73.5%
Yizre'el Valley	103,799	92,395	89.0%	9,206	8.9%
Yoqne'am	39,268	38,648	98.4%	62	0.2%
Menashe Plateau	6,701	6,568	98.0%	1	0.01%
Nazareth-Tir'an Mountains	365,856	73,943	20.7%	281,529	78.9%
Shefar'am	237,934	12,884	5.4%	224,466	94.3%
Karmi'el	124,110	50,347	40.6%	73,076	58.9%
Yehi'am	107,395	36,102	33.6%	70,629	65.8%
Elon	23,282	10,568	45.4%	12,227	52.5%
Nahariyya	119,958	87,844	73.2%	30,931	25.8%
Akko	79,406	40,219	50.7%	38,476	48.5%
Hermon	13,960	208	1.5%	13,697	98.1%
Northern Golan	19,056	4,876	25.6%	13,919	73.0%
Middle Golan	13,150	12,748	96.9%	85	0.7%
Southern Golan	11,445	11,002	96.1%	11	0.1%
Haifa	634,396	545,123	85.9%	78,148	12.3%
Karmel Coast	36,200	21,821	60.3%	13,648	37.7%
Zikhron Ya'aqov	29,467	28,517	96.8%	437	1.5%
Alexander Mountain	180,516	46,488	25.8%	133,474	73.9%
Hadera	279,015	213,494	76.5%	61,283	22.0%
Western Sharon	391,559	379,138	96.8%	1,268	0.3%
Eastern Sharon	124,922	15,993	12.8%	106,809	85.5%
Southern Sharon	298,061	280,316	94.0%	11,379	3.8%
Petah Tikva	540,293	491,396	91.0%	31,969	5.9%
Modi'in	109,131	107,749	98.7%	77	0.1%
Ramla	296,753	239,793	80.8%	48,653	16.4%
Rehovot	336,065	327,647	97.5%	1,221	0.4%
Rishon LeZiyyon	312,680	305,274	97.6%	506	0.2%
Tel Aviv	657,267	597,646	90.9%	27,565	4.2%
Ramat Gan	547,015	530,529	97.0%	1,631	0.3%
Holon	334,814	321,897	96.1%	2,162	0.7%
Mal'akhi	71,300	67,036	94.0%	363	0.5%
Lakhish	94,037	89,392	95.1%	224	0.2%
Ashdod	228,562	222,786	97.5%	723	0.3%
Ashqelon	234,785	226,054	96.3%	1,037	0.4%
Gerar	80,268	76,276	95.0%	136	0.2%
Besor	68,766	62,836	91.4%	508	0.7%
Be'er Sheva	527,255 (Note: This statistic is incomplete, as it does not include Bedouins who lived in unrecognized villages.)	268,971	51.0%	251,713	47.7%
Dead Sea	1,775	1,058	59.6%	34	1.9%
Arava	67,489	58,201	86.2%	3,425	5.1%
Northern Negev Mountains	69,445	62,022	89.3%	5,012	7.2%
Southern Negev Mountains	577	516	89.4%	12	2.1%
Judea and Samaria Area (non-Israeli Arabs not included)	514,496	508,904	98.9%	1,086	0.2%

The most prominent ethnic and religious groups that live in Israel at present and that are Israeli citizens or nationals are as follows:

=== Jews ===
According to Israel's Central Bureau of Statistics, in 2008, of Israel's 7.3 million people, 75.6 percent were Jews of any background. Among them, 70.3 percent were Sabras (born in Israel), mostly second- or third-generation Israelis, and the rest are olim (Jewish immigrants to Israel)—20.5 percent from Europe and the Americas, and 9.2 percent from Asia and Africa, including the Arab countries.

According to Israel's Central Bureau of Statistics, in April 2023, of Israel's 9.7 million people, 73.5 percent, or 7.145 million, were Jews of any background.

There are no government statistics categorizing Israeli Jews as "Ashkenazi", "Mizrahi", etc, but studies and estimates have been conducted. In a 2019 study, in a sample meant to be representative of the Israeli Jewish population, about 44.9% percent of Israel's Jewish population were categorized as Mizrahi (defined as having grandparents born in Asia or North Africa), 31.8% were categorized as Ashkenazi (defined as having grandparents born in Europe, the Americas, Oceania and South Africa), 12.4% as "Soviet" (defined as having progenitors who came from the ex-USSR in 1989 or later), about 3% as Beta Israel (Ethiopia) and 7.9% as a mix of these, or other Jewish groups.

The paternal lineage of the Jewish population of Israel as of 2015 is as follows:

Recent paternal ancestral background of Israeli Jews
Countries of Origin	Population			Percentage		
Countries of Origin	Share	2015	2008	Share	2015	2008
Total	▲	6,276,800	5,523,700	-	100%	100%
From Israel by paternal country of origin:	▲	2,765,500	2,043,800	▲	44.06%	37%
From Europe by own or paternal country of origin:	▼	1,648,000	1,662,800	▼	26.26%	30.1%
Russia, Ukraine, Belarus, and the former Soviet Union	▼	891,700	923,600	▼	14.21%	16.83%
Romania	▼	199,400	213,100	▼	3.18%	3.86%
Poland	▼	185,400	198,500	▼	2.95%	3.59%
France	▲	87,500	63,200	▲	1.39%	1.14%
Germany and Austria	▲	70,800	49,700	▲	1.13%	0.9%
Hungary, Czech Republic, and Slovakia	▼	59,800	64,900	▼	0.95%	1.17%
United Kingdom	▲	46,000	39,800	▲	0.73%	0.72%
Bulgaria and Greece	▼	45,500	48,900	▼	0.72%	0.89%
Other European	▲	61,900	61,100	▼	0.99%	1.11%
From Africa by own or paternal country of origin:	▲	897,300	859,100	▼	14.3%	15.53%
Morocco	▼	484,500	486,600	▼	7.72%	8.81%
Algeria and Tunisia	▲	133,500	120,600	▼	2.13%	2.18%
Ethiopia	▲	133,200	106,900	▲	2.12%	1.94%
Libya	▼	66,800	67,400	▼	1.06%	1.22%
Egypt	▼	54,600	55,800	▼	0.87%	1.01%
Other African	▲	24,700	17,200	▲	0.39%	0.31%
From Asia by own or paternal country of origin:	▼	674,500	681,400	▼	10.75%	12.33%
Iraq	▼	225,800	233,500	▼	3.6%	4.23%
Iran (Persia)	▲	140,100	134,700	▲	2.23%	2.44%
Yemen	▼	134,100	138,300	▼	2.14%	2.5%
Turkey	▼	74,600	76,900	▼	1.19%	1.39%
India and Pakistan	▲	47,600	45,600	▼	0.76%	0.83%
Syria and Lebanon	▼	34,500	35,300	▼	0.55%	0.64%
Other Asian	▲	18,000	17,200	▼	0.29%	0.31%
From the Americas and Oceania by own or paternal country of origin:	▲	291,500	249,800	▲	4.64%	4.52%
United States, Canada, Australia, and New Zealand	▲	181,000	149,200	▲	2.88%	2.7%
Argentina	▲	62,600	59,400	▼	1%	1.08%
Other Latin American	▲	47,900	41,200	▲	0.76%	0.75%

=== Arabs ===
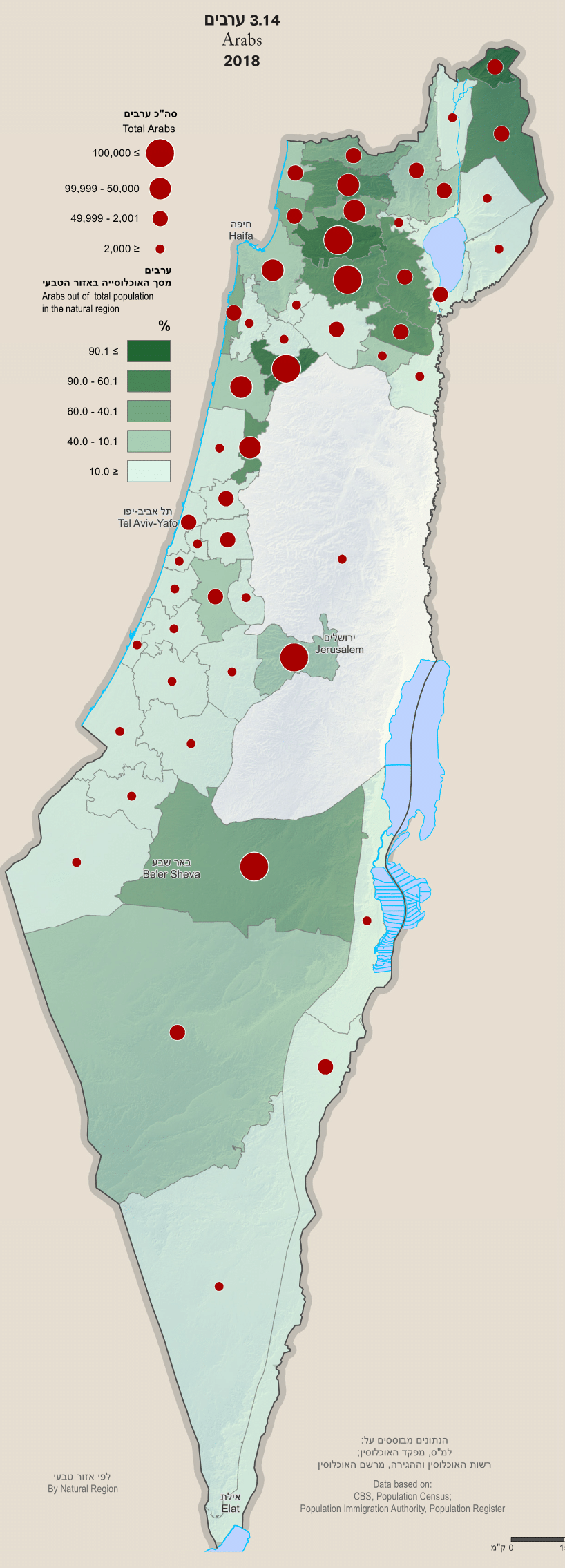
Arabs in Israel, by natural region, 2018

Arab citizens of Israel are those Arab residents of Mandatory Palestine that remained within Israel's borders following the 1948 Arab–Israeli War and the establishment of the State of Israel. It is including those born within the state borders subsequent to this time, as well as those who had left during the establishment of the state (or their descendants), who have since re-entered by means accepted as lawful residence by the Israeli state (primarily family reunifications).

In 2019, the official number of Arab residents in Israel was 1,890,000 people, representing 21% of Israel's population. This figure includes 209,000 Arabs (14% of the Israeli Arab population) in East Jerusalem, also counted in the Palestinian statistics, although 98 percent of East Jerusalem Palestinians have either Israeli residency or Israeli citizenship.

Arab Muslims

Most Arab citizens of Israel are Muslim, particularly of the Sunni branch of Islam. A small minority are Ahmadiyya sect and there are also some Alawites (affiliated with Shia Islam) in the northernmost village of Ghajar with Israeli citizenship. As of 2019, Arab citizens of Israel composed 21 percent of the country's total population. About 82 percent of the Arab population in Israel are Sunni Muslims, a very small minority are Shia Muslims, another 9 percent are Druze, and around 9 percent are Christian (mostly Eastern Orthodox and Catholic denominations).

Bedouin

The Arab Muslim citizens of Israel include also the Bedouins, who are divided into two main groups: the Bedouin in the north of Israel, who live in villages and towns for the most part, and the Bedouin in the Negev, who include half-nomadic and inhabitants of towns and Unrecognized villages. According to the Israeli Ministry of Foreign Affairs, as of 1999, 110,000 Bedouins live in the Negev, 50,000 in the Galilee and 10,000 in the central region of Israel. The vast majority of Arab Bedouins of Israel practice Sunni Islam.

Ahmadiyya

The Ahmadiyya community was first established in the region in the 1920s, in what was then Mandatory Palestine. There is a large community in Kababir, a neighborhood on Mount Carmel in Haifa. It is unknown how many Israeli Ahmadis there are, although it is estimated there are about 2,200 Ahmadis in Kababir alone.

Arab Christians

As of December 2013, about 161,000 Israeli citizens practiced Christianity, together comprising about 2% of the total population. The largest group consists of Melkites (about 60% of Israel's Christians), followed by the Greek Orthodox (about 30%), with the remaining ca. 10% spread between the Roman Catholic (Latin), Maronite, Anglican, Lutheran, Armenian, Syriac, Ethiopian, Coptic and other denominations.

Druze

The Arab citizens of Israel include also the Druze, who numbered at an estimated 143,000 in April 2019. All of the Druze living in what was then British Mandate Palestine became Israeli citizens after the declaration of the State of Israel. Druze serve prominently in the Israel Defense Forces, and are represented in mainstream Israeli politics and business as well, unlike Muslim or Christian Arabs who are not required to and generally choose not to serve in the Israeli army. Though a few individuals identify themselves as "Palestinian Druze", the vast majority of Druze do not consider themselves to be 'Palestinian', and consider their Israeli identity stronger than their Arab identity. A 2017 Pew Research Center poll reported that the majority of the Israeli Druze identified as ethnically Arab.

=== Syriac Christians ===
Arameans

In 2014, Israel decided to recognize the Aramaic community within its borders as a national minority, allowing some of the Christians in Israel to be registered as "Aramean" instead of "Arab". As of October 2014, some 600 Israelis requested to be registered as Arameans, with several thousand eligible for the status – mostly members of the Maronite community with some Assyrians as well.

The Maronite Christian community in Israel of around 7,000 resides mostly in the Galilee, with a presence in Haifa, Nazareth and Jerusalem. It is largely composed of families that lived in Upper Galilee in villages such as Jish long before the establishment of Israel in 1948. In the year 2000, the community was joined by a group of Lebanese SLA militia members and their families, who fled Lebanon after 2000 withdrawal of IDF from South Lebanon.

Assyrians

There are around 1,000 Assyrians living in Israel, mostly in Jerusalem and Nazareth. Assyrians are an Aramaic speaking, Eastern Rite Christian minority who are descended from the ancient Mesopotamians. The old Syriac Orthodox monastery of Saint Mark lies in Jerusalem. Other than followers of the Syriac Orthodox Church, there are also followers of the Assyrian Church of the East and the Chaldean Catholic Church living in Israel.

=== Other citizens ===
Copts

Some 1,000 Israeli citizens belong to the Coptic community, originating in Egypt.

Samaritans

The Samaritans are an ethnoreligious group of the Levant. Ancestrally, they claim descent from a group of Israelite inhabitants who have connections to ancient Samaria from the beginning of the Babylonian Exile up to the beginning of the Common Era. 2007 population estimates show that 712 Samaritans live half in Holon, Israel and half at Mount Gerizim in the West Bank. The Holon community holds Israeli citizenship, while the Gerizim community resides at an Israeli-controlled enclave, holding dual Israeli-Palestinian citizenship.

Armenians

About 4,000 Armenians reside in Israel mostly in Jerusalem (including in the Armenian Quarter), but also in Tel Aviv, Haifa and Jaffa. Armenians have a Patriarchate in Jerusalem and churches in Jerusalem, Haifa and Jaffa. Although Armenians of Old Jerusalem have Israeli identity cards, they are officially holders of Jordanian passports.

Circassians

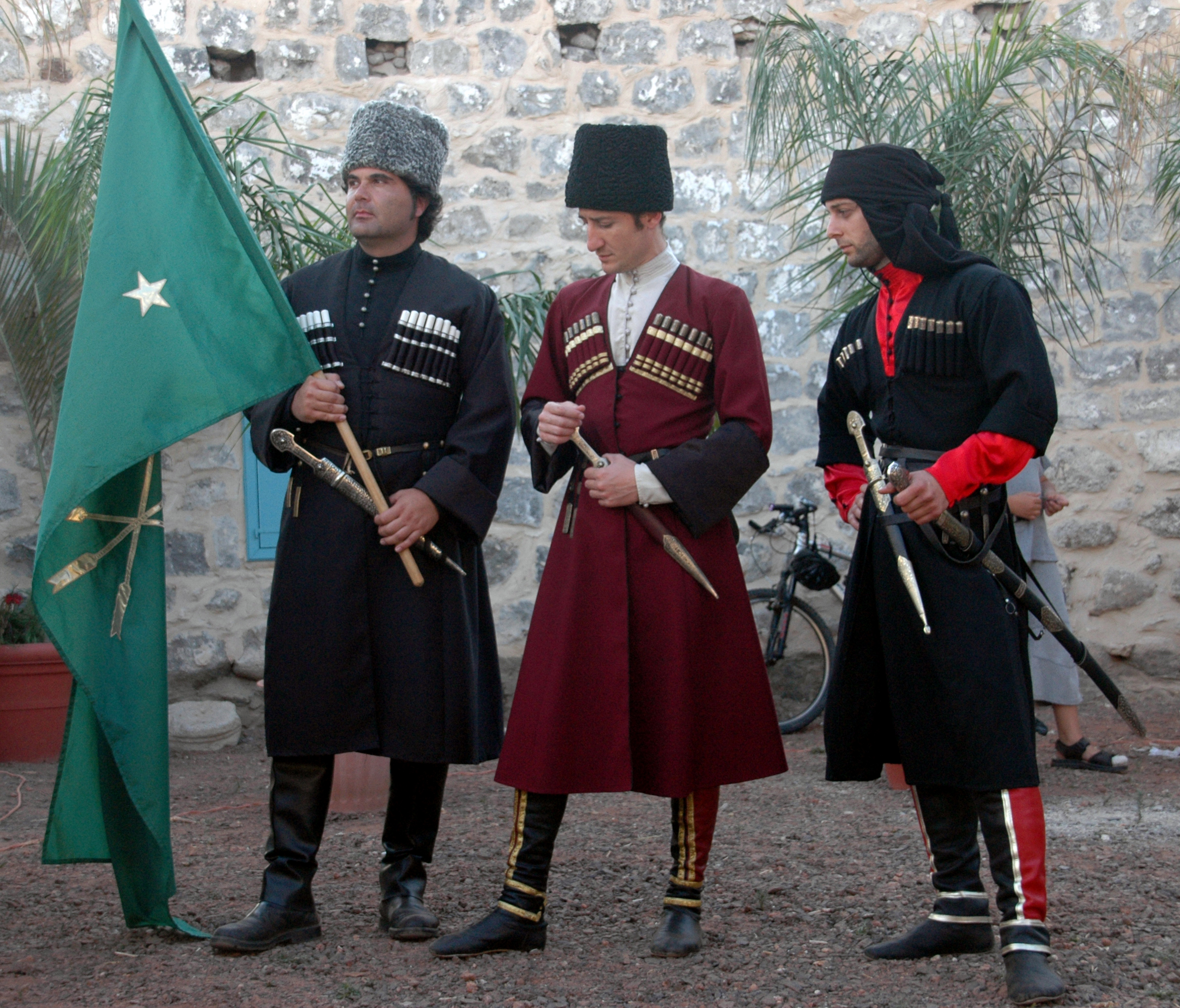
Circassians in Kfar Kama

In Israel, there are also a few thousand Circassians, living mostly in Kfar Kama (2,000) and Reyhaniye (1,000). These two villages were a part of a greater group of Circassian villages around the Golan Heights. The Circassians in Israel enjoy, like Druzes, a status aparte. Male Circassians (at their leader's request) are mandated for military service, while females are not.

People from post-Soviet states

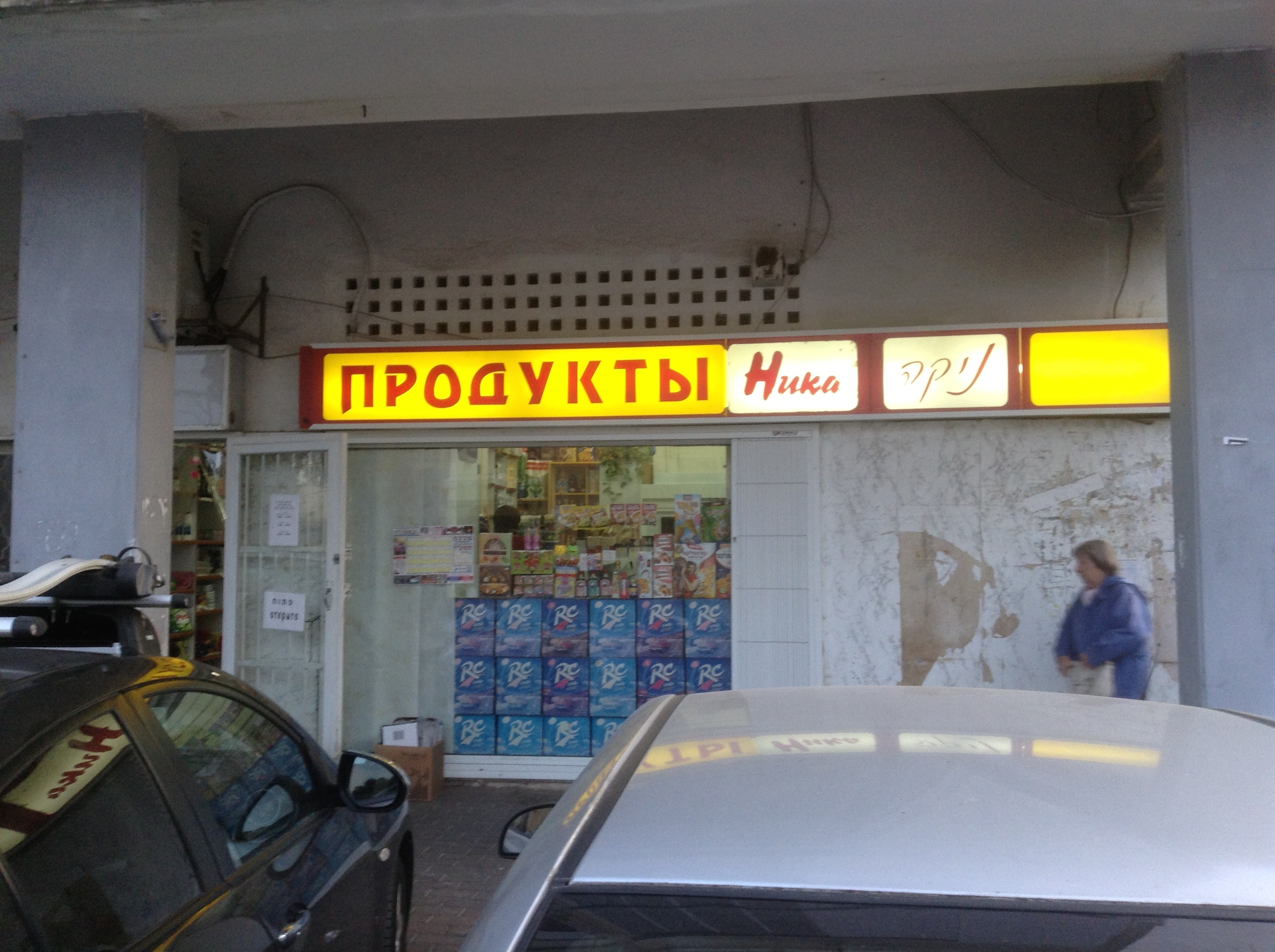
Russophone shop in Haifa

Ethnic Russians, Ukrainians, and Belarusians, immigrants from the former Soviet Union, who were eligible to emigrate due to having, or being married to somebody who has, at least one Jewish grandparent and thus qualified for Israeli citizenship under the revised Law of Return. A number of these immigrants also belong to various ethnic groups from the Former Soviet Union such as Armenians, Georgians, Azeris, Uzbeks, Moldovans, Tatars, among others. Some of them, having a Jewish father or grandfather, identify as Jews, but being non-Jewish by Orthodox Halakha (religious law), they are not recognized formally as Jews by the state. Most of them are in the mainstream of Israel culture and are called "expanded Jewish population". In addition, a certain number of former Soviet citizens, primarily women of Russian and Ukrainian ethnicity, emigrated to Israel, after marrying Muslim or Christian Arab citizens of Israel, who went to study in the former Soviet Union in the 1970s and 1980s. 1,557,698 people from the current Russia and Ukraine live in Israel.

Finns

Although most people of Finnish origin in Israel are Finnish Jews who immigrated to Israel, and their descendants, a small number of Finnish Christians moved to Israel in the 1940s before independence and gained citizenship following independence. For the most part, many of the original Finnish settlers intermarried with the other communities in the country, and therefore remain very small in number. A Moshav shitufi near Jerusalem named Yad HaShmona, meaning the "Memorial for the Eight", was established in 1971 by a group of Finnish Christian-Israelis, although today, most members are Israeli, and are predominantly Hebrew speakers, and the moshav has become a center of Messianic Jews.

Baháʼís

The population of followers of the Baháʼí Faith in Israel is almost entirely made up of volunteers serving at the Baháʼí World Centre. Bahá'u'lláh (1817–1892), the Faith's founder, was banished to Akka and died nearby where his shrine is located. During his lifetime he instructed his followers not to teach or convert those living in the area, and the Baháʼís descending from those original immigrants were later asked to leave and teach elsewhere. For nearly a century there has been a policy by Baháʼí leaders to not accept converts living in Israel. The 650 or so foreign national Baháʼís living in Israel are almost all on temporary duty serving at the shrines and administrative offices.

Vietnamese

The number of Vietnamese people in Israel and their descendants is estimated at 150 to 200. Most of them came to Israel in between 1976 and 1979, after prime minister Menachem Begin authorized their admission to Israel and granted them political asylum. The Vietnamese people living in Israel are Israeli citizens who also serve in the Israel Defense Forces. Today, the majority of the community lives in the Gush Dan area in the center of Tel Aviv, but also a few dozen Vietnamese-Israelis or Israelis of Vietnamese origin live in Haifa, Jerusalem, and Ofakim.

African Hebrew Israelites of Jerusalem

The African Hebrew Israelite Nation of Jerusalem is a religious sect of Black Americans, founded in 1960 by Ben Carter a metal worker in Chicago. The members of this sect believe they are descended from the tribes of Judah driven from the Holy Land by the Romans during the First Jewish War (70 AD), and who reportedly emigrated to West Africa before being taken as slaves to the United States. With a population of over 5,000, most members live in their own community in Dimona, Israel, with additional families in Arad, Mitzpe Ramon, and the Tiberias area. The group believes that the ancient Israelites are the ancestors of Black Americans and that the actual Jews are "impostors". Some scholarship does consider them to be of subsaharan African origin, rather than Levantine. Their ancestors were Black Americans who, after being expelled from Liberia, illegally immigrated to Israel in the late 1960s using tourist visas, requesting that Israel provide them legal citizenship status. Israel granted their requests. The African Hebrew Israelites, like the Haredim and most Israeli Arabs, are not required to serve in the military; however, some do.

Naturalized foreign workers

Some naturalized foreign workers and their children born in Israel, predominantly from the Philippines, Nepal, Nigeria, Senegal, Romania, China, Cyprus, Thailand, and South America (mainly Colombia).

=== Non-citizens ===
African migrants

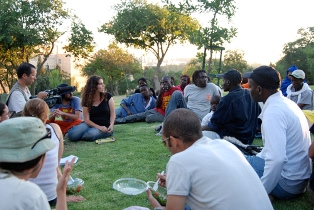
Meeting between Sudanese refugees and Israeli students, 2007.

The number and status of African migrants in Israel is disputed and controversial, but it is estimated that at least 70,000 refugees mainly from Eritrea, Sudan, South Sudan, Ethiopia, and the Ivory Coast reside and work in Israel. A count in late 2011 published in Ynet pointed out the number only in Tel Aviv is 40,000, which represents 10 percent of the city's population. The vast majority live in the southern parts of the city. There is a significant population in the southern Israeli cities of Eilat, Arad, and Beersheba.

Foreign workers

There are around 300,000 foreign workers, residing in Israel under temporary work visas, including Palestinians. Most of those foreign workers engage in agriculture and construction. The main groups of those foreign workers include the Chinese, Thai, Filipinos, Nigerians, Romanians, and Latin Americans.

Other refugees

Approximately 100–200 refugees from Bosnia, Kosovo, Iraqi Kurdistan, and North Korea were absorbed in Israel as refugees. Most of them were also given Israeli resident status, and currently reside in Israel. As of 2006, some 200 ethnic Kurdish refugees from Turkey resided in Israel as illegal immigrants, fleeing the Kurdish–Turkish conflict.

== Languages ==
According to a 2011 survey of Israelis over 20 years of age conducted by the Israel Central Bureau of Statistics, 49% report Hebrew as their native language, Arabic 18%, Russian 15%, Yiddish 2%, French 2%, English 2%, Spanish 1.6%, and 10% other languages (including Romanian, and Amharic, which were not offered as answers by the survey). The study also noted that 90% of Israeli Jews and over 60% of Israeli Arabs have a good understanding of Hebrew.

== Religion ==
Religion in Israel
Jewish, Muslim, Christian, Druze, Other.
Until 1995, figures for Christians also included Others.

According to a 2010 Israel Central Bureau of Statistics study of Israeli Jews aged over 18:

Israeli Jews define themselves as:
1. Haredim (or ultra-Orthodox) (8.00%)
2. "religious" (non-Haredi Orthodox, also known as: dati leumi/national-religious or religious Zionist) (12.0%)
3. "religious-traditionalists" (mostly adhering to Jewish Halakha) (13.0%)
4. "non-religious traditionalists" (only partly respecting the Jewish Halakha) (25.0%)
5. "secular" (43.0%)

While the ultra-Orthodox, or Haredim, represented only 5% of Israel's population in 1990, they are expected to represent more than one-fifth of Israel's Jewish population by 2028. By 2022, Haredim were 13.3% of the population and enumerated 1,280,000.

Religious makeup, 2019
Group	Population	%
Jews	6,697,000	74.2%
Muslims	1,605,700	17.8%
Christians	180,400	2.0%
Druze	143,000	1.6%
Other/unknown	394,900	4.4%

== Education ==
Education between ages 5 and 15 is compulsory. It is not free, but it is subsidized by the government, individual organizations (such as the Beit Yaakov System), or a combination. Parents are expected to participate in courses as well. The school system is organized into kindergartens, 6-year primary schools, and either 6-year secondary schools or 3-year junior secondary schools + 3-year senior secondary schools (depending on region), after which a comprehensive examination is offered for university admissions.

=== Literacy ===
Age 15 and over can read and write (2011 estimate):

- Total population: 97.8%
- Male: 98.7%
- Female: 96.8%

== Policy ==
Israel is the thirtieth-most-densely-crowded country in the world. In an academic article, Jewish National Fund Board member Daniel Orenstein, argues that, as elsewhere, overpopulation is a stressor on the environment in Israel; he shows that environmentalists have conspicuously failed to consider the impact of population on the environment, and argues that overpopulation in Israel has not been appropriately addressed for ideological reasons.

=== Citizenship and Entry Law ===
The Citizenship and Entry into Israel Law (Temporary Order) 5763 was first passed on 31 July 2003, and has since been extended until 31 July 2008. The law places age restrictions for the automatic granting of Israeli citizenship and residency permits to spouses of Israeli citizens, such that spouses who are inhabitants of the West Bank and Gaza Strip are ineligible. On 8 May 2005, the Israeli ministerial committee for issues of legislation once again amended the Citizenship and Entry into Israel Law, to restrict citizenship and residence in Israel only to Palestinian men over the age of 35, and Palestinian women over the age of 25. Those in favor of the law say the law not only limits the possibility of the entrance of terrorists into Israel, but, as Ze'ev Boim asserts, allows Israel "to maintain the state's democratic nature, but also its Jewish nature" (i. e., its Jewish demographic majority). Critics, including the United Nations Committee on the Elimination of Racial Discrimination, say the law disproportionately affects Arab citizens of Israel, since Arabs in Israel are far more likely to have spouses from the West Bank and Gaza Strip than other Israeli citizens.

In the constitutional challenges to the Citizenship and Entry to Israel Law, the state, represented by the Attorney General, insisted that security was the only objective behind the law. The state also added that even if the law was intended to achieve demographic objectives, it is still in conformity with Israel's Jewish and democratic definition, and thus constitutional. In a 2012 ruling by the Supreme Court on the issue, some of the judges on the panel discussed demography, and were inclined to accept that demography is a legitimate consideration in devising family reunification policies that violate the right to family life.

== Vital statistics ==
Birth and death rates in Israel
Year	Population	Live births	Deaths	Natural increase	Crude birth rate (per 1,000)	Crude death rate (per 1,000)	Natural change (per 1,000)	Crude migration rate (per 1,000)	Total fertility rate
1950	1,370,000	43,431	8,700	34,731	34.1	6.8	27.3		4.52
1951	1,578,000	50,542	9,866	40,676	34.3	6.7	27.6	104.2	4.45
1952	1,630,000	52,556	11,666	40,890	32.8	7.3	25.5	6.4	4.32
1953	1,669,000	52,552	10,916	41,636	31.9	6.6	25.3	-1.9	4.21
1954	1,718,000	48,951	11,328	37,623	28.9	6.7	22.2	6.3	4.11
1955	1,789,000	50,686	10,532	40,154	28.9	6.0	22.9	16.8	4.03
1956	1,872,000	52,287	12,025	40,262	28.6	6.6	22.0	22.3	3.96
1957	1,976,000	53,940	12,487	41,453	28.0	6.5	21.5	31.1	3.92
1958	2,032,000	52,649	11,615	41,034	26.3	5.8	20.5	7.8	3.88
1959	2,089,000	54,604	12,056	42,548	26.5	5.9	20.6	6.7	3.86
1960	2,150,000	56,002	12,053	43,949	26.4	5.7	20.7	7.7	3.84
1961	2,234,000	54,869	12,663	42,206	25.0	5.8	19.2	18.4	3.84
1962	2,332,000	56,356	13,701	42,655	24.7	6.0	18.7	23.3	3.83
1963	2,430,000	59,491	14,425	45,066	25.0	6.1	18.9	21.3	3.82
1964	2,526,000	63,544	15,491	48,053	25.6	6.3	19.3	18.7	3.81
1965	2,598,000	66,146	16,261	49,885	25.8	6.3	19.5	8.2	3.99
1966	2,657,000	67,148	16,582	50,566	25.6	6.3	19.3	2.9	3.80
1967	2,776,000	64,980	17,463	47,517	23.9	6.4	17.5	25.4	3.80
1968	2,841,000	69,911	18,689	51,222	24.9	6.7	18.2	4.7	3.81
1969	2,930,000	73,666	19,767	53,899	25.5	6.9	18.6	11.8	3.81
1970	3,022,000	80,843	21,234	59,609	27.2	7.1	20.1	10.3	3.82
1971	3,121,000	85,899	21,415	64,484	28.0	7.0	21.0	10.7	3.81
1972	3,225,000	85,544	22,719	62,825	27.0	7.2	19.8	12.4	3.80
1973	3,338,000	88,545	23,054	65,491	27.0	7.0	20.0	13.9	3.77
1974	3,422,000	93,166	24,135	69,031	27.6	7.1	20.5	4.0	3.72
1975	3,493,000	95,628	24,600	71,028	27.7	7.1	20.6	-0.3	3.68
1976	3,575,000	98,763	24,012	74,751	27.9	6.8	21.1	1.8	3.59
1977	3,653,000	95,315	24,951	70,364	26.4	6.9	19.5	1.9	3.51
1978	3,738,000	92,602	25,153	67,449	25.1	6.8	18.3	4.4	3.28
1979	3,836,000	93,710	25,700	68,010	24.7	6.8	17.9	7.6	3.21
1980	3,922,000	94,321	26,364	67,957	24.3	6.8	17.5	4.4	3.14
1981	3,978,000	93,308	26,085	67,223	23.6	6.6	17.0	-2.9	3.06
1982	4,064,000	96,695	27,780	68,915	24.0	6.9	17.1	4.1	3.12
1983	4,119,000	98,724	27,731	70,993	24.0	6.7	17.3	-3.9	3.14
1984	4,200,000	98,478	27,805	70,673	23.3	6.6	16.7	2.6	3.13
1985	4,266,000	99,376	28,093	71,283	23.1	6.5	16.6	-1.1	3.12
1986	4,331,000	99,341	29,415	69,926	22.7	6.7	16.0	-1.0	3.09
1987	4,407,000	99,022	29,244	69,778	22.2	6.6	15.6	1.6	3.05
1988	4,477,000	100,454	29,176	71,278	22.2	6.4	15.8	-0.2	3.06
1989	4,560,000	100,757	28,580	72,177	22.1	6.3	15.8	2.4	3.03
1990	4,822,000	103,349	28,734	74,615	22.0	6.1	15.9	38.4	3.02
1991	5,059,000	105,725	31,266	74,459	21.4	6.3	15.1	31.7	2.91
1992	5,196,000	110,062	33,327	76,735	21.5	6.5	15.0	11.4	2.93
1993	5,328,000	112,330	33,000	79,330	21.3	6.3	15.0	9.8	2.92
1994	5,472,000	114,543	33,535	81,008	21.2	6.2	15.0	11.3	2.90
1995	5,612,000	116,886	35,348	81,538	21.1	6.4	14.7	10.2	2.88
1996	5,758,000	121,333	34,664	86,669	21.3	6.1	15.2	10.2	2.94
1997	5,900,000	124,478	36,124	88,354	21.4	6.2	15.2	8.9	2.93
1998	6,041,000	130,080	36,955	93,125	21.8	6.2	15.6	7.7	2.98
1999	6,209,000	131,936	37,291	94,645	21.6	6.1	15.5	11.6	2.94
2000	6,369,000	136,390	37,688	98,702	21.7	6.0	15.7	9.4	2.95
2001	6,509,000	136,636	37,186	99,450	21.2	5.8	15.4	6.1	2.89
2002	6,631,000	139,535	38,415	101,120	21.2	5.8	15.4	3.0	2.89
2003	6,748,000	144,936	38,499	106,437	21.7	5.8	15.9	1.4	2.95
2004	6,870,000	145,207	37,938	107,269	21.3	5.6	15.7	2.1	2.90
2005	6,991,000	143,913	39,038	104,875	20.8	5.6	15.2	2.1	2.84
2006	7,117,000	148,170	38,765	109,405	21.0	5.5	15.5	2.2	2.88
2007	7,244,000	151,679	40,081	111,598	21.1	5.5	15.6	1.9	2.90
2008	7,419,100	156,923	39,484	117,439	21.5	5.4	16.1	7.5	2.96
2009	7,552,000	161,042	38,812	122,230	21.5	5.2	16.3	1.3	2.96
2010	7,695,100	166,255	39,613	126,642	21.8	5.2	16.6	2.0	3.03
2011	7,836,600	166,296	40,889	125,407	21.4	5.3	16.1	2.0	3.00
2012	7,984,500	170,940	42,100	128,840	21.6	5.3	16.3	2.1	3.05
2013	8,134,500	171,444	41,683	129,761	21.3	5.2	16.1	2.3	3.03
2014	8,296,900	176,427	42,457	133,970	21.5	5.2	16.3	3.3	3.08
2015	8,463,400	178,723	44,507	134,216	21.3	5.3	16.0	3.6	3.09
2016	8,628,600	181,405	44,244	137,161	21.2	5.2	16.0	3.2	3.11
2017	8,797,900	183,648	44,923	138,725	21.1	5.2	15.9	3.3	3.11
2018	8,967,600	184,370	44,850	139,520	20.8	5.0	15.7	3.6	3.09
2019	9,140,500	182,016	46,328	135,688	20.1	5.1	15.0	4.3	3.01
2020	9,289,800	177,307	49,006	128,301	19.2	5.3	13.9	2.4	2.90
2021	9,453,000	185,040	50,984	134,056	19.7	5.4	14.3	5.4	3.00
2022	9,662,000	181,193	52,054	129,139	19.0	5.4	13.6	8.5	2.89
2023	9,915,000	178,724	49,977	128,747	18.6	5.2	13.4	13.0	2.85
2024	10,055,000	181,614	51,908	129,706	18.6	5.3	13.3	0.8	2.87
2025	10,177,000	183,705	50,911	132,794	18.6	5.2	13.4	–1.3	2.89

View source data.
View source data.
View source data.

=== Current vital statistics ===
Period	Live births	Deaths	Natural increase
January—August 2025	119,551	34,782	+84,769
January—August 2026	121,156	33,824	+87,332
Difference	▲ +1,605 (+1.3%)	▼ –958 (-2.8%)	▲ +2,563

== Migration ==
=== Immigration ===
In 2013 Israel had an estimated net migration rate of 1.81 migrant(s) per 1,000 population. In 2024 and 2025, Israel experienced negative net migration: yerida was higher than aliyah.

Immigrants by last country of residence in recent years (according to CBS):

Country	2019	2020	2021	2022
Russia	15,824	6,675	7,640	45,472
Ukraine	6,194	2,944	3,059	14,656
United States	2,481	2,296	3,480	2,953
France	2,227	2,406	3,594	2,211
Belarus	924	625	1,014	2,237
Argentina	411	551	830	958
United Kingdom	498	460	644	568
South Africa	343	269	447	419
Canada	217	236	280	398
Georgia	316	231	142	381
Brazil	589	512	505	350
Uzbekistan	209	147	289	293
Kazakhstan	201	139	212	239
Germany	164	80	151	196
Azerbaijan	191	95	146	166
Moldova	156	130	99	147
Latvia	80	32	64	146
Mexico	133	174	293	141
Australia	129	82	98	135
Belgium	97	86	163	104
Chile	43	77	95	101
Ethiopia			1,636^{a}	
Others		1,921		
Total	33,257	19,714	25,497	74,714

^a The vast majority of immigrants from Ethiopia come as part of a family reunification program, as opposed to the Law of Return. They are therefore not counted as olim for a given year by the Central Bureau of Statistics

==== Immigration from the USSR ====
During the 1970s about 163,000 people of Jewish descent immigrated to Israel from the USSR.

Later Ariel Sharon, in his capacity as Minister of Housing & Construction and member of the Ministerial Committee for Immigration & Absorption, launched an unprecedented large-scale construction effort to accommodate the new Russian population in Israel so as to facilitate their smooth integration and encourage further Jewish immigration as an ongoing means of increasing the Jewish population of Israel. Between 1989 and 2006, about 979,000 Jews emigrated from the former Soviet Union to Israel.

=== Emigration ===
For many years definitive data on Israeli emigration was unavailable. In The Israeli Diaspora sociologist Stephen J. Gold maintains that calculation of Jewish emigration has been a contentious issue, explaining, "Since Zionism, the philosophy that underlies the existence of the Jewish state, calls for return home of the world's Jews, the opposite movement—Israelis leaving the Jewish state to reside elsewhere—clearly presents an ideological and demographic problem."

In the past several decades, emigration (yerida) has seen a considerable increase. From 1990 to 2005, 230,000 Israelis left the country; a large proportion of these departures included people who initially immigrated to Israel and then reversed their course (48% of all post-1990 departures and even 60% of 2003 and 2004 departures were former immigrants to Israel). 8% of Jewish immigrants in the post-1990 period left Israel, while 15% of non-Jewish immigrants did. In 2005 alone, 21,500 Israelis left the country and had not yet returned at the end of 2006; among them 73% were Jews, 5% Arabs, and 22% "Others" (mostly non-Jewish immigrants, with Jewish ancestry, from USSR). At the same time, 10,500 Israelis came back to Israel after over one year abroad; 84% were Jews, 9% Others, and 7% Arabs.

According to the Israel Central Bureau of Statistics, as of 2005, 650,000 Israelis had left the country for over one year and not returned. Of them, 530,000 are still alive today. This number does not include the children born overseas. It should also be noted that Israeli law grants citizenship only to the first generation of children born to Israeli emigrants.

== Health ==
=== HIV/AIDS – adult prevalence rate ===
- 0.2% (2009 est.)

=== Obesity – adult prevalence rate ===
- 26% of women and 40% of men are overweight. In both genders, obesity rate is 15% (as of 2011).

== Future projections ==
In June 2013, the Central Bureau of Statistics released a demographic report, projecting that Israel's population would grow to 11.4 million by 2035, with the Jewish population numbering 8.3 million, or 73% of the population, and the Arab population at 2.6 million, or 23%. This includes some 2.3 million Muslims (20% of the population), 185,000 Druze, and 152,000 Christians. The report predicts that the Israeli population growth rate will decline to 1.4% annually, with growth in the Muslim population remaining higher than the Jewish population until 2035, at which point the Jewish population will begin growing the fastest.

In 2017, the Central Bureau of Statistics projected that Israel's population would rise to about 18 million by 2059, including 14.4 million Jews and 3.6 million Arabs. Of the Jewish population, about 5.25 million would be Haredi. Overall, the forecast projected that 49% of the population would be either Haredi Jews (29%) or Arabs (20%). It also projected a population of 20 million in 2065. Jews and other non-Arabs are expected to compose 81% of the population in 2065, and Arabs 19%. About 32% of the population is expected to be Haredi.

Other forecasts project that Israel could have a population as high as 23 million, or even 36 million, by 2050.

== See also ==
- Aliyah
- Yerida
- Crime in Israel
- Culture of Israel
- Demographic history of Palestine (region)
- Demographics of the Middle East
- Demographics of the State of Palestine
- Health care in Israel
- Israel Central Bureau of Statistics
- Jewish population by country
- Standard of living in Israel
- Women in Israel
