= Dead Sea Natural Region =

Coordinates: 31°12′03″N 35°21′51″E

- Natural Region
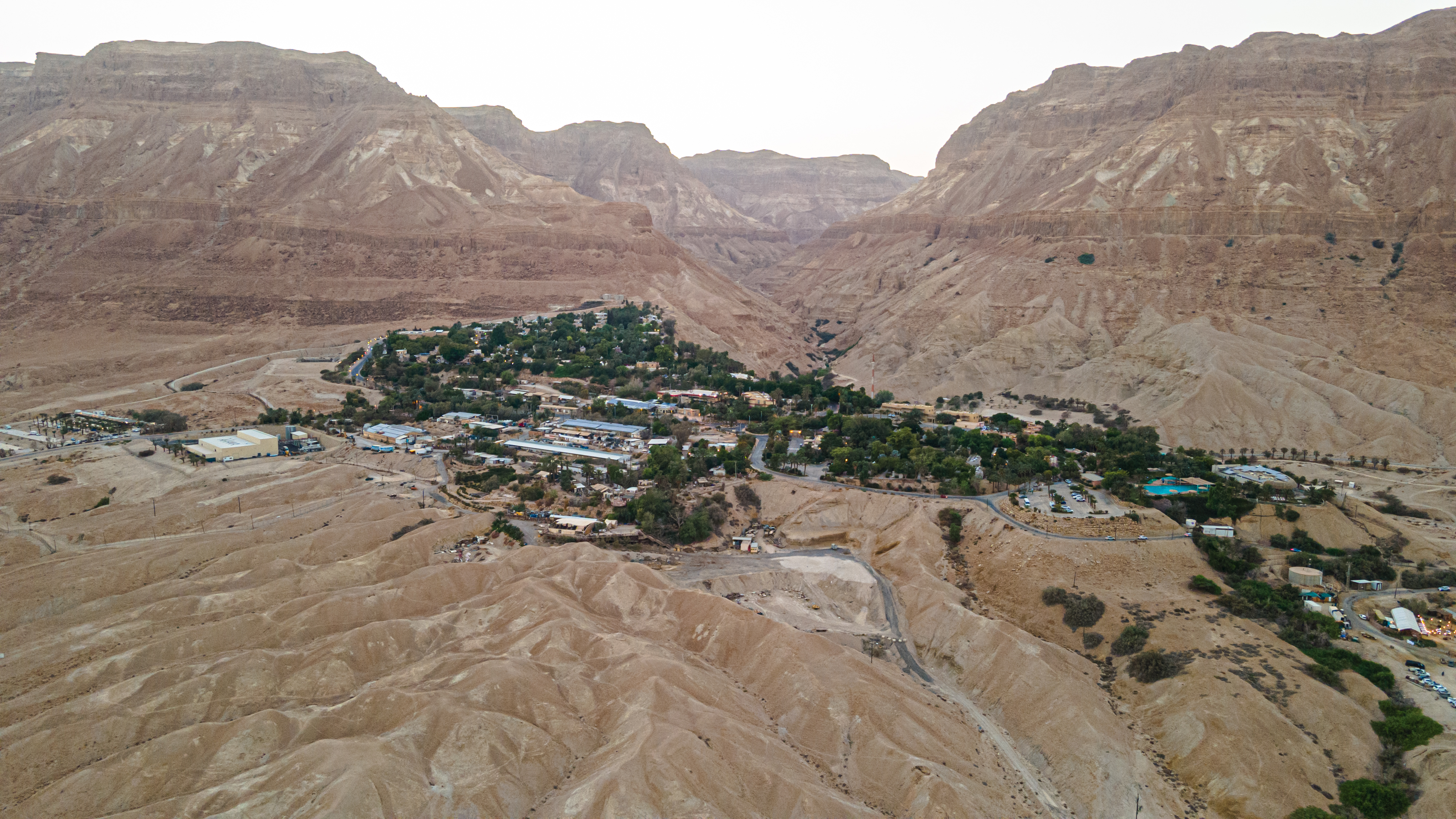
- View of Ein Gedi, the largest community in the Dead Sea Natural Region
- Country: Israel
- District: Southern
- Subdistrict: Beersheba
- Largest Town: Ein Gedi

Area
  - Total: 634 km^{2} (245 sq mi)

Population (2024)
  - Total: 1,775

Ethnicity
  - Jews and others: 98.1%
  - Arabs: 1.9%

The Dead Sea Natural Region is a natural region in the Beersheba Subdistrict, in the Southern District of Israel. Ein Gedi is the largest town in the natural region.

== Geography ==
Districts, Subdistricts and Natural Regions of the State of Israel, 2018

The natural region consists of the portion of the Southern District located in the valley of the Dead Sea. It is located east of Arad and north of the Arava valley. It has an area of 634 km^{2}. The largest town in the natural region is the kibbutz Ein Gedi, at the northern end of the region, which contains 41 percent of the natural region's population. The natural region contains only three other towns, along with the Ein Bokek resort area. The natural region contains a portion of the Tamar Regional Council.

== Demographics ==
The vast majority of the residents of the Dead Sea Natural Region are Jewish. There are no Arab towns in the natural region.

Historical population
Year	Pop.	±%
1972	300	—
1983	800	+166.7%
1995	1,000	+25.0%
2008	1,000	+0.0%
2022	1,356	+35.6%
2024	1,775	+30.9%

== Administrative local authorities ==
Cities	Local Councils	Villages
[None]	[None]	Tamar: Ein Gedi; Ein Tamar; Ne'ot HaKikar; Neve Zohar

== Voting Patterns ==
In the 2022 election, 77 percent of voters in the natural region voted for the parties of the center-left coalition led by Yair Lapid, while 18 percent voted for the parties of the right-wing coalition led by Benjamin Netanyahu and 1.5 percent voted for the Arab parties.

In the 2026 election, 73 percent of voters in the natural region voted for the parties of the center-left coalition led by Gadi Eisenkot, while 18 percent voted for the parties of the right-wing coalition led by Benjamin Netanyahu and 1.4 percent voted for the Arab parties. An additional 4.3 percent voted for the Reservists, and 3 percent voted for Amcha Yisrael. Voter turnout increased 16 percent from the 2022 election.
