= Ein Bokek =

Ein Bokek עֵין בּוֹקֵק عين بوقيق
- Resort
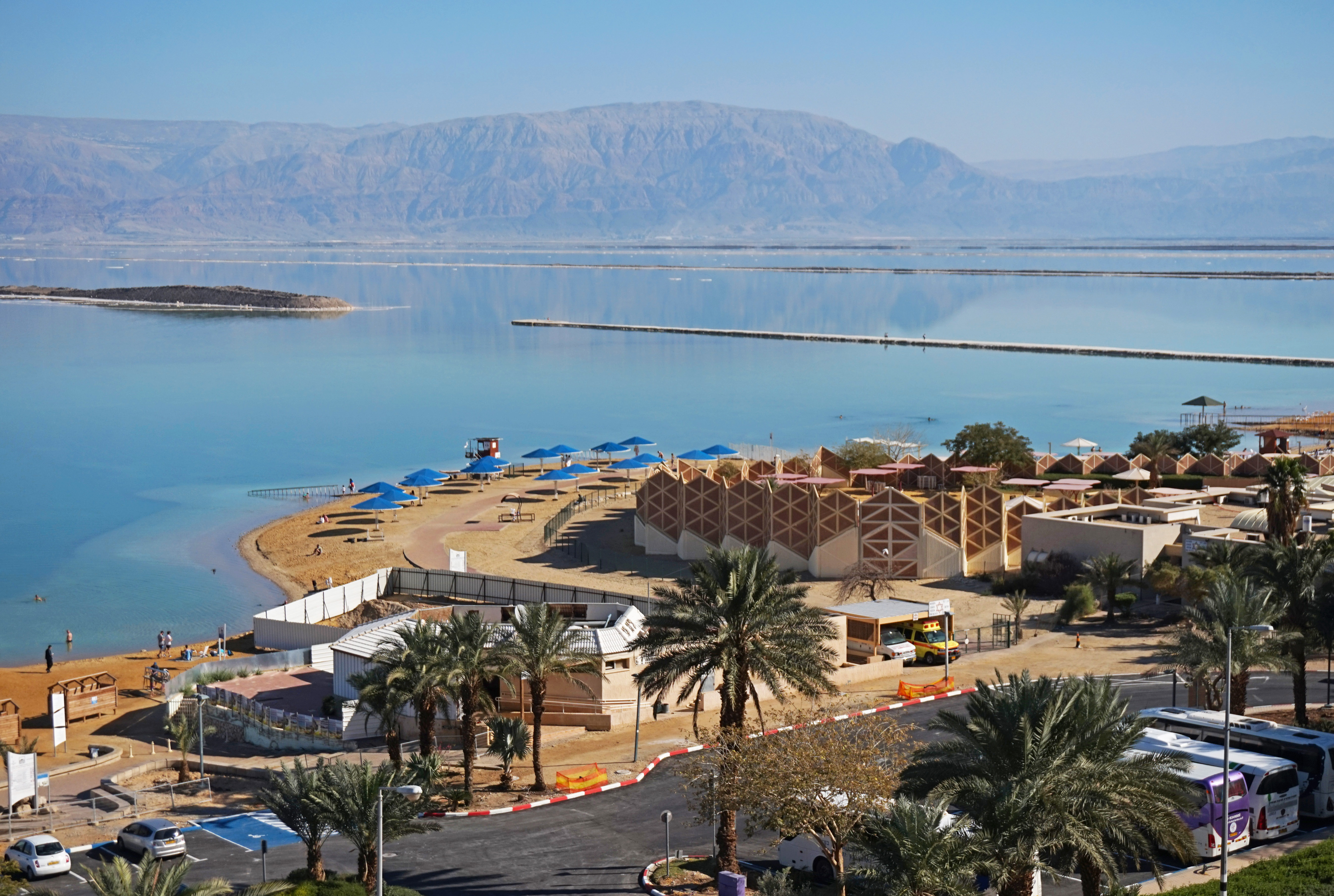
- View of Ein Bokek, February 2016

- Location in Israel
- Coordinates: 31°12′N 35°21.75′E
- Country: Israel
- District: Southern
- Subdistrict: Beersheba
- Regional Council: Tamar
- Website: www.einbokek.com

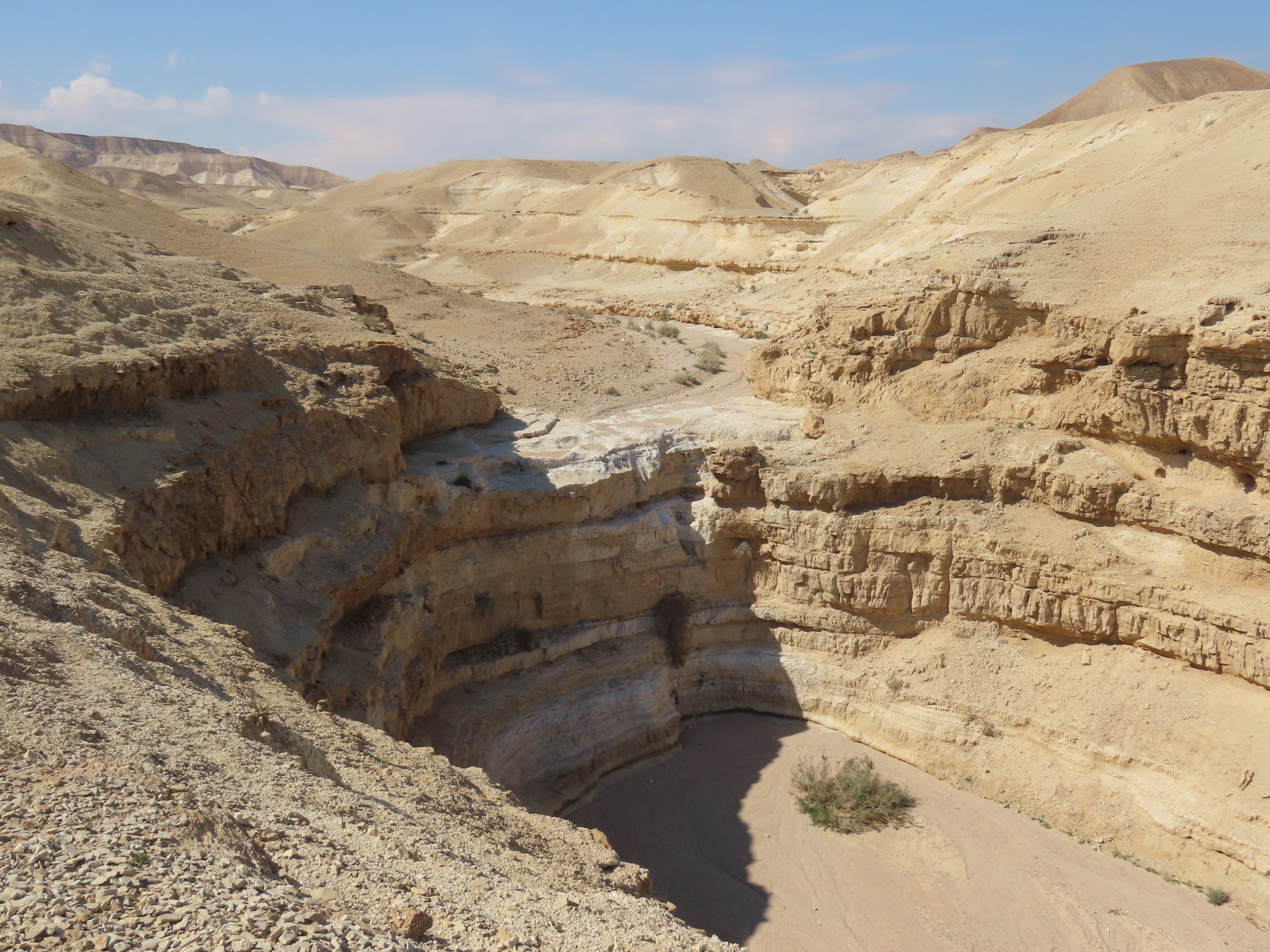
Ein Bokek

Ein Bokek (Hebrew: עֵין בּוֹקֵק; Arabic: عين بوقيق) is an Israeli seaside resort on the Dead Sea, near Neve Zohar. It is under the jurisdiction of the Tamar Regional Council in the Southern District.

== History ==
Archaeological findings at Ein Bokek include the ruins of Metzad Bokek, a small Roman-era fortress commanding the main road, and the remains of an ancient partly reconstructed perfume and medicine factory. The Bokek Stream, for which the district is named, is a canyon-like gorge with water springs and unique fauna and flora.

The first hotel was built in 1960. In 2000, 14 hotels were operating in Ein Bokek, offering various types of spas and Dead Sea health treatments. As of 2018, Ein Bokek is set to undergo significant development with the Dead Sea Valley Tourism Complex, designed by Israeli architect Moshe Safdie. The project will include a convention center, a visitor center, two low-rise luxury hotels with additional hotels planned for the future, entertainment and culinary venues, an advanced spa, and a shopping mall.

The Zohar Hot Springs (Hebrew: חמי זוהר Hamei Zohar) are located three kilometres (1.9 mi) to the south of Ein Bokek. Rich in sulfur, the water is believed to be particularly beneficial in the treatment of muscular ailments, diseases of the joints, and allergies.

The world's lowest installed automated teller machine is at Ein Bokek; it was installed independently by a grocery store at 421 metres (1,381 ft) below sea level.

== Panorama ==
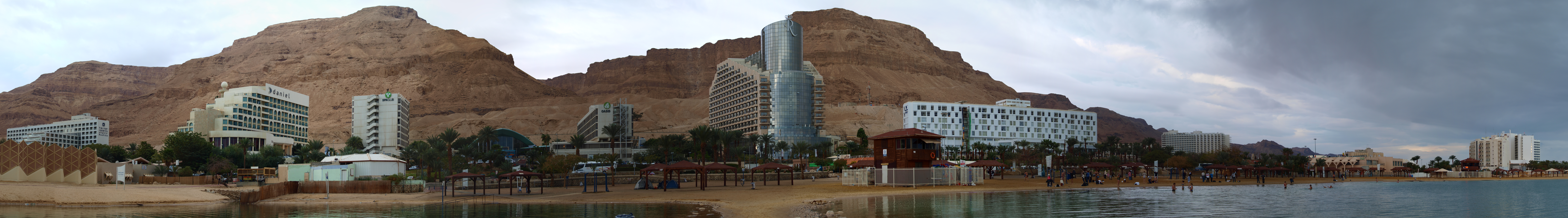
Panorama of Ein Bokek

== See also ==
- Tourism in Israel
