= Har Amasa =

Moshav in southern Israel

Har Amasa: הר עמשא (Hebrew); هار عماسا (Arabic)
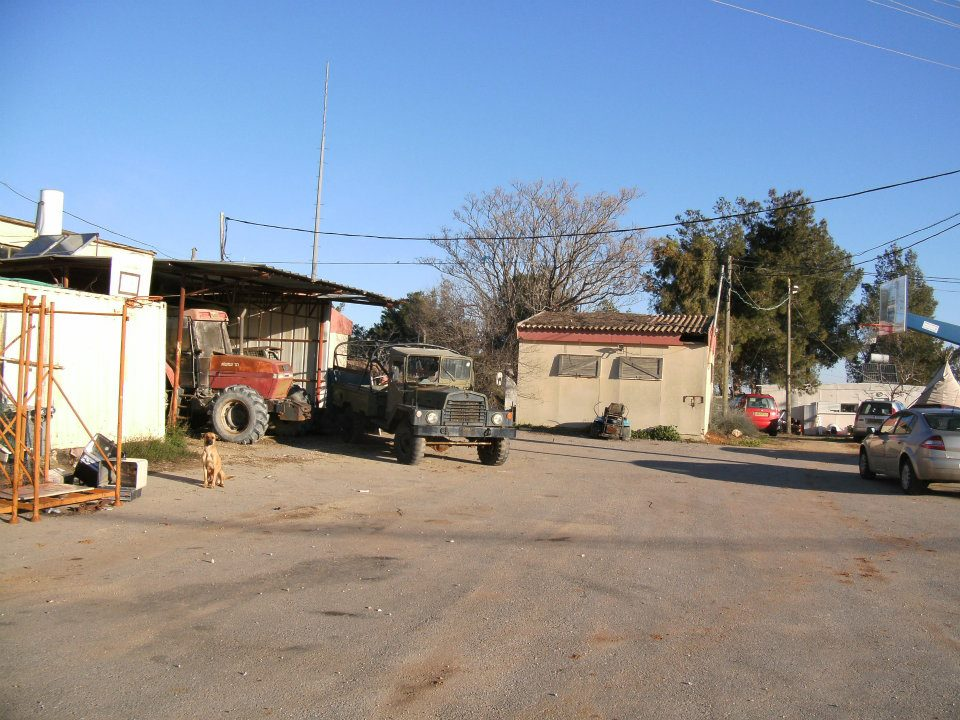

- Location within Northern Negev region of Israel
- Coordinates: 31°20′36″N 35°6′6″E
- Country: Israel
- District: Southern
- Subdistrict: Beersheba
- Council: Tamar
- Affiliation: Agricultural Union
- Founded: 1983
- Founder: Gush Emunim
- Population (2024): 258
- Website: www.amasa.co.il

Har Amasa (Hebrew: הַר עֲמָשָׂא, lit. Mount Amasa) is a Moshav shitufi in the south of Israel. Located near the Yatir Forest 20 kilometres south of Hebron and 14 km northwest of Arad, it is the only member of the Tamar Regional Council to be located in the highlands outside the Jordan Rift Valley. In 2024 it had a population of 258.

It was named after the nearby Mount Amasa (859 m), which was in turn named after Amasa son of Ithra the Israelite (2 Samuel 17:25).

== History ==
The village was founded as a kibbutz of the United Kibbutz Movement on June 30, 1983. However, gradually changed its character over the next 20 years. In 2003, it was transferred to the authority of the Agricultural Union movement, and it was preparing to expand to include many new residents in a less formal framework, while still preserving its social fabric.

In 2006, Ynet reported that five families in the kibbutz were undergoing a religious conversion through Chabad. According to certain members of the kibbutz, the reason was that they were abandoned by the Kibbutz Movement that purposely kept their status as a "kibbutz under construction" in order to receive its funding. The movement denied the allegations and stated that the religious converts were new residents. In 2006, the kibbutz members sent a petition to the High Court of Justice to transfer the village's administration to them and remove the "under construction" status, instead of being administered by the Kibbutz Movement.

In 2021 the village had 50 families, defined itself as an ecological, secular moshav shitufi and was accepting new families.

== Climate ==
Har Amasa has a semi-arid climate (Köppen climate classification: BSk). The average annual temperature is 17.1 °C (62.8 °F), and around 330 mm (12.99 in) of precipitation falls annually.

Climate data for Har Amasa
Month	Jan	Feb	Mar	Apr	May	Jun	Jul	Aug	Sep	Oct	Nov	Dec	Year
Mean daily maximum °C (°F)	13.3 (55.9)	14.3 (57.7)	17.6 (63.7)	21.9 (71.4)	26.6 (79.9)	29.1 (84.4)	30.3 (86.5)	30.5 (86.9)	28.8 (83.8)	26.2 (79.2)	20.9 (69.6)	15.3 (59.5)	22.9 (73.2)
Daily mean °C (°F)	9.1 (48.4)	9.8 (49.6)	12.3 (54.1)	15.7 (60.3)	19.8 (67.6)	22.1 (71.8)	23.6 (74.5)	23.8 (74.8)	22.2 (72.0)	19.7 (67.5)	15.6 (60.1)	10.9 (51.6)	17.1 (62.7)
Mean daily minimum °C (°F)	5 (41)	5.4 (41.7)	7 (45)	9.5 (49.1)	13 (55)	15.2 (59.4)	16.9 (62.4)	17.2 (63.0)	15.6 (60.1)	13.3 (55.9)	10.3 (50.5)	6.6 (43.9)	11.3 (52.3)
Average precipitation mm (inches)	78 (3.1)	67 (2.6)	57 (2.2)	16 (0.6)	4 (0.2)	0 (0)	0 (0)	0 (0)	0 (0)	6 (0.2)	40 (1.6)	62 (2.4)	330 (13.0)
