= Ein Tamar =

Moshav in southern Israel

Ein Tamar: עֵין תָּמָר (Hebrew); عين تمار (Arabic)
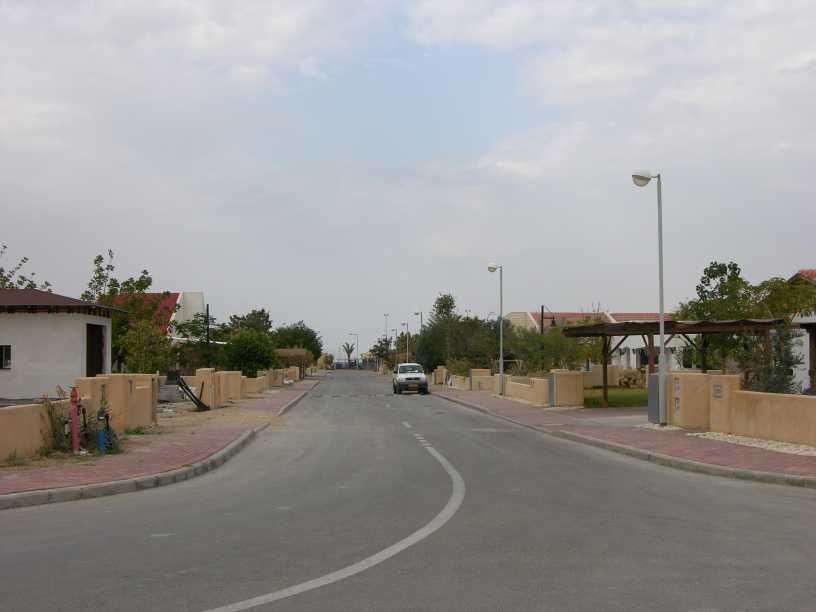
- Etymology: Date Palm Spring
- Location within Northern Negev region of Israel Location within Israel
- Coordinates: 30°56′31″N 35°22′19″E
- Country: Israel
- District: Southern
- Subdistrict: Beersheba
- Council: Tamar
- Affiliation: Agricultural Union
- Founded: 1982
- Population (2024): 405

Ein Tamar (Hebrew: עֵין תָּמָר, lit. Date Palm Spring) is a moshav in the northern Arava valley in Israel. Located south of the Dead Sea, it falls under the jurisdiction of Tamar Regional Council. In 2024 Ein Tamar had a population of 405.

== History ==
Ein Tamar was established in August 1982 by 24 families. The biblical village of Tamar mentioned in Ezekiel 47:19 is probably located in the Hatzeva Fortress near Ir Ovot. Ein Tamar and the neighboring village of Neot HaKikar are among the country's most remote places, forty minutes away from the nearest city, Dimona. Most of the residents of Ein Tamar earn their livelihood from agriculture. Peppers and melons are the main crops.
