= Neve Zohar =

Community settlement in southern Israel

Neve Zohar: נְוֵה זֹהַר (Hebrew); نفة زوهر (Arabic)
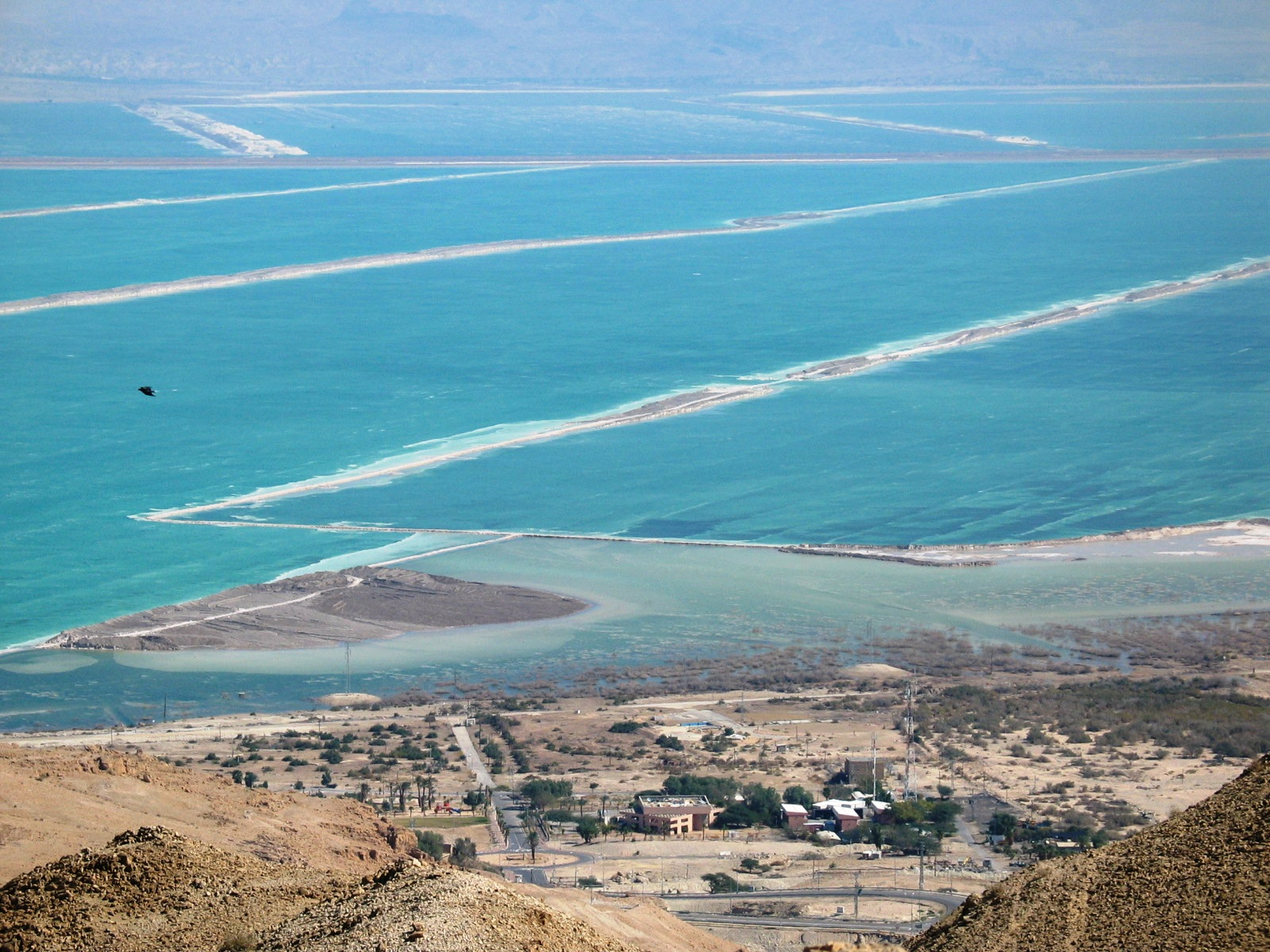

- Location within Northern Negev region of Israel Location within Israel
- Coordinates: 31°9′8″N 35°21′55″E
- Country: Israel
- District: Southern
- Subdistrict: Beersheba
- Council: Tamar
- Population (2024): 166
- Website: www.neve-zohar.co.il

Neve Zohar (Hebrew: נְוֵה זֹהַר) is a community settlement in southern Israel. Located on the junction of Highway 31 and Highway 90 (Zohar Junction), on the shores of the Dead Sea and 23 km from Arad by road, it falls under the jurisdiction of Tamar Regional Council. In 2024 it had a population of 166.

The village is the closest permanent settlement to the Ein Bokek Dead Sea hotel area and hosts the regional council's offices. It is the lowest permanent human settlement in the world.

== History ==
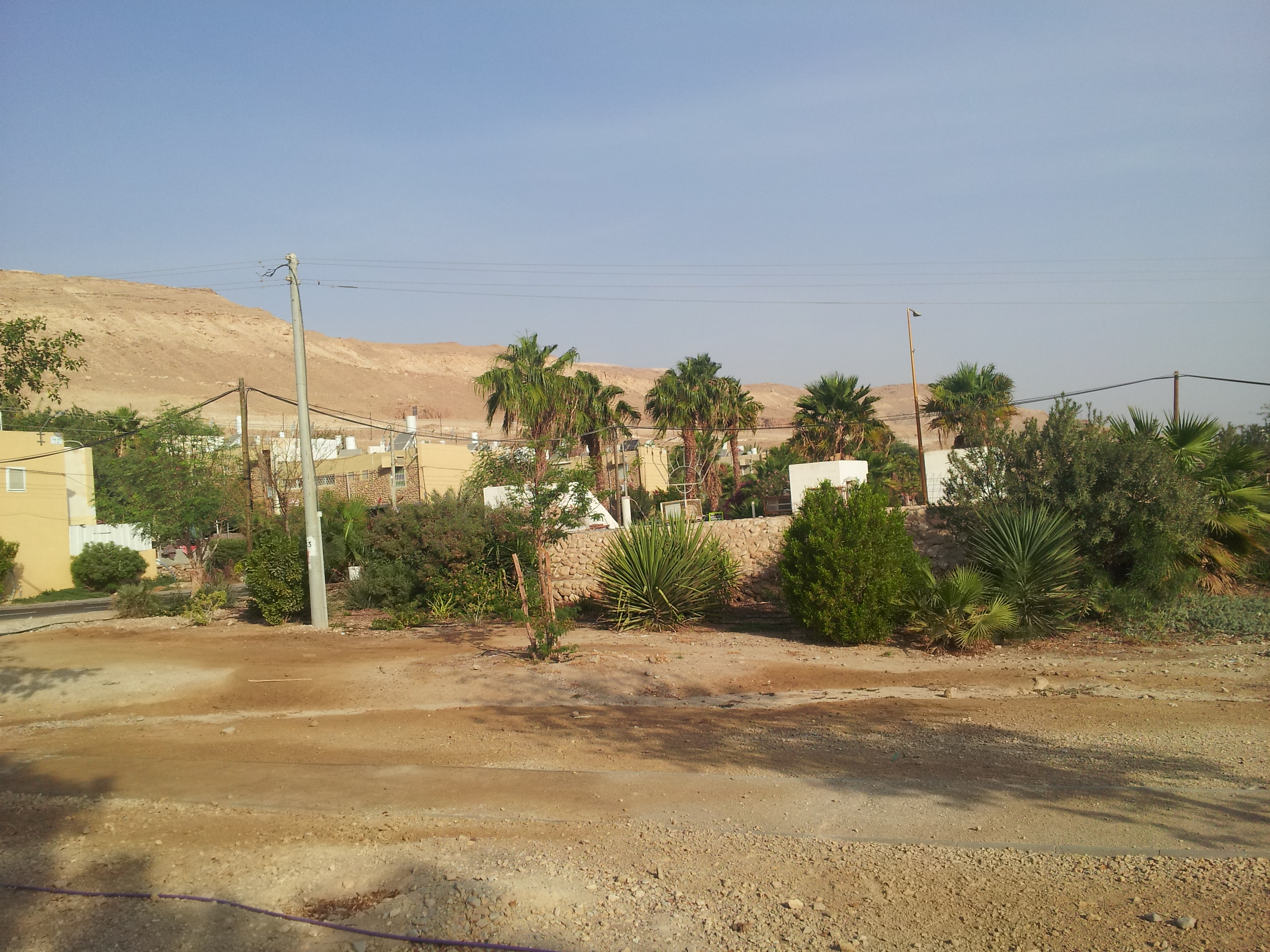
Homes in Neve Zohar

Neve Zohar was established in 1964 as a work camp for Dead Sea factory workers, although its immediate location was a major transport junction during numerous historical periods. It was named after the Zohar Stream, a wadi that flows into the Dead Sea.

In 2008, Neve Zohar had a population of 30 families.

The village also has a regional elementary school and a museum (Beit HaYotzer, lit. "house of the potter" or "house of the artist-creator") displaying Dead Sea-related items. An unused airfield is situated slightly to the southeast of the village.
