= Neot HaKikar disaster =

Cliff collapse in Israel

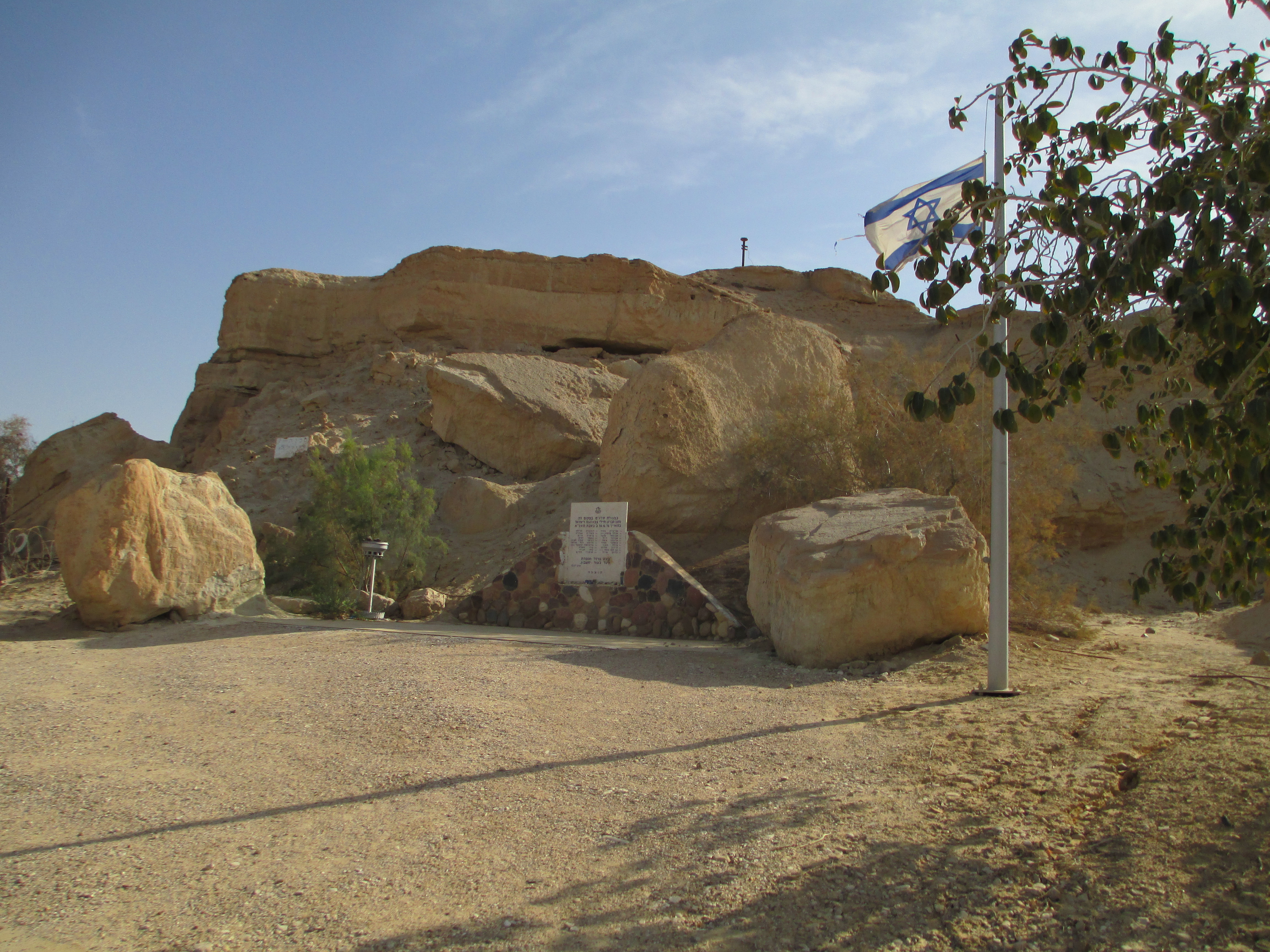
Neot HaKikar Memorial

The Neot HaKikar disaster (Hebrew: אסון נאות הכיכר), which occurred on 30 December 1970, was one of the worst natural disasters in the history of the State of Israel. Heavy rains caused rocks to detach from an overhanging cliff, crushing the dining room in an Israel Defense Forces base. 19 soldiers and one civilian were killed and ten soldiers were injured (three of them severely).

== The accident and rescue operations ==
On Wednesday, 30 December 1970, at 12:15, part of a 12-meter-high cliff suddenly detached and hit an IDF military base kitchen. Soon afterwards, the whole cliff detached and crushed the base dining room while the soldiers were having lunch.

The soldiers who were outside the dining room quickly called for assistance, and in less than an hour the first Israeli Air Force helicopter landed at base with a medical team.

The base was covered in rocks which were on average three meters high and about five meters wide, preventing the immediate evacuation of the dead and wounded, who were buried underneath 1,500 tons of rock and soil. Removing the rocks was only possible with heavy mechanical equipment. Initially, the heavy mechanical equipment arrived from the nearby Dead Sea Works potash plant, and later heavy mechanical equipment was also sent from the Combat Engineering Corps.

The rescue operations continued uninterrupted into the night, during which floodlights and torches were used to allow the work to continue. During the rescue work, Defense Minister Moshe Dayan, IDF Chief of Staff Haim Bar-Lev, and Southern Command chief Ariel Sharon visited the scene. By midnight, all of the injured and dead had been recovered.
