= City council (Israel) =

Administrative division in Israel

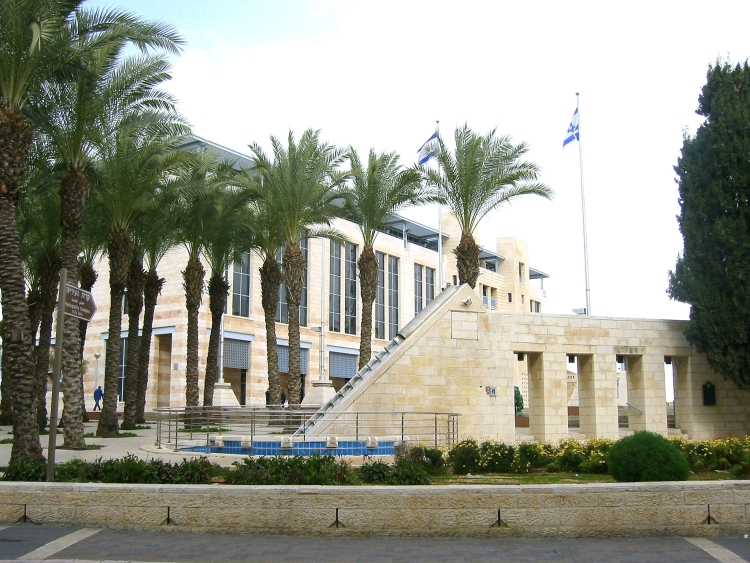
Headquarters of the Jerusalem Municipality

A city council (Hebrew: עִירִיָּה, Iriya) is the official designation of a city within Israel's system of local government.

There are three types of local governments in Israel depending on size:

Cities or Municipalities (Iriyot in Hebrew) are the cities, which have populations greater than 20,000

Local Councils (Mo'atzot Mekomiyot) are small towns of populations between 2000 and 20,000.

Regional Councils (Mo'atzot Ezoriyot) are small rural communities which are run as one system. Examples are kibbutzim and moshavim).

Each local authority is led by an elected council and a mayor or head of council, who are chosen every five years in local elections.

City status, specifically local council, is determined by the Interior Minister based on municipality size, and whose character is urban, defined as having areas zoned for distinct land use like residential, commercial, and industrial areas.

City mayors and members of the city councils are elected every five years. In 2024 there were 77 municipalities, consisting of 6.6 million residents. This made up 74.4% of Israel’s population. In 2024, there were 14 Arab city councils in Israel. The largest cities with Arab populations are Nazareth (77,200 residents) and Rahat (75,700 residents, primarily Bedouin).

== See also ==
- List of cities in Israel
- Local council (Israel)
- Regional council (Israel)
