= Tamar Regional Council =

Tamar Regional Council מועצה אזורית תמר
- Regional council
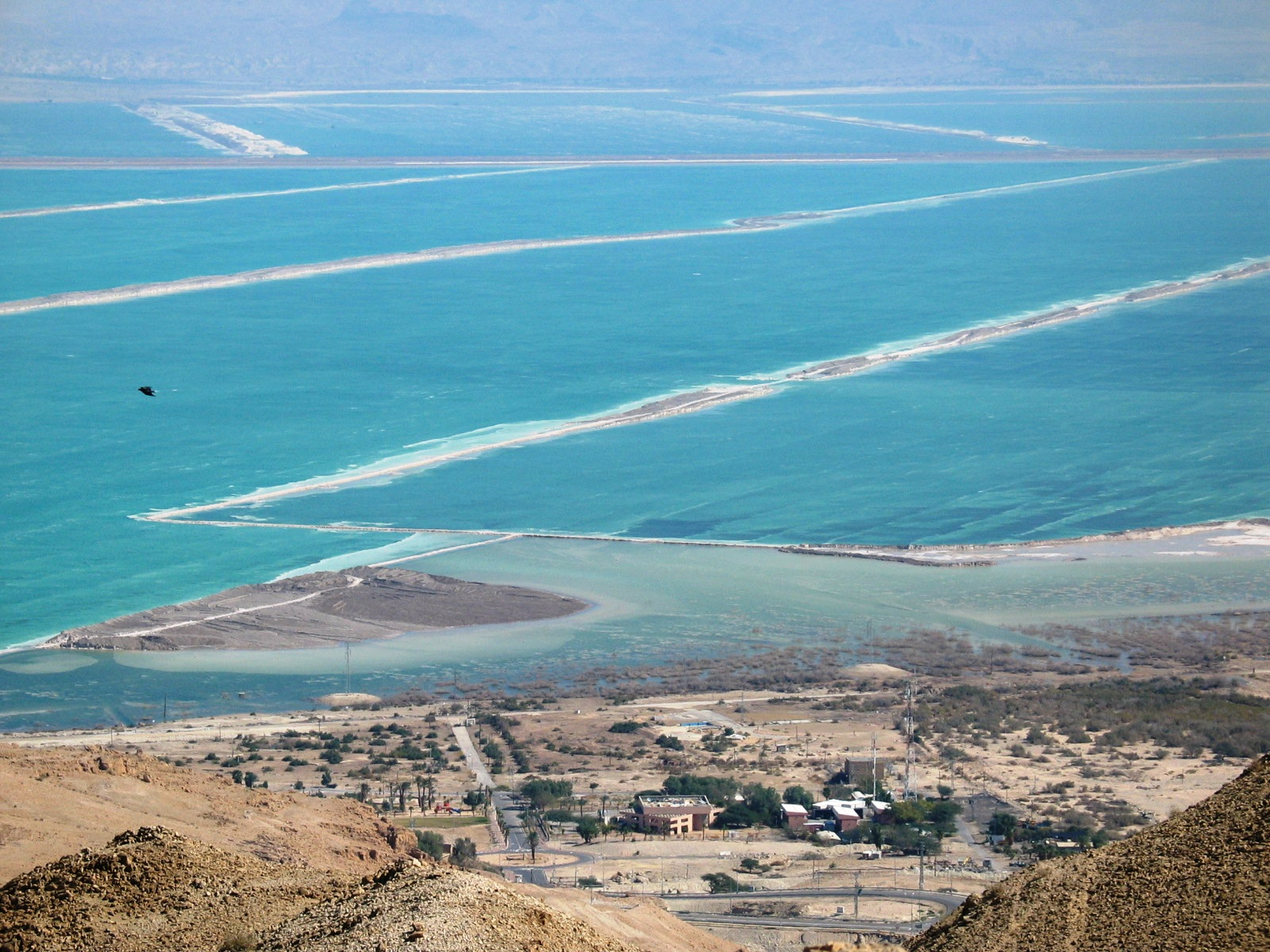
- Headquarters of the Tamar Regional Council at Neve Zohar on the shores of the southern Dead Sea.
- Interactive map of Tamar Regional Council
- Country: Israel
- District: Southern
- Subdistrict: Beersheba
- Natural region: Arava, Be'er Sheva, Dead Sea
- Founded: 1955

Government
  - Head of Municipality: Nir Wanger

Area
  - Total: 1,650,000 dunams (1,650 km^{2}; 640 sq mi)

Population (2024)
  - Total: 2,140
  - Density: 1.30/km^{2} (3.36/sq mi)

The Tamar Regional Council (Hebrew: מועצה אזורית תמר, Mo'atza Ezorit Tamar) is a regional council in Israel's Southern District, on the south and western edges of the Dead Sea along the Arava valley. The council was established in 1955 with the opening of lodging at Sodom near the Dead Sea Works, and its jurisdiction covers an area of 1,650 km^{2}.

The first council head was Yehuda Almog (Kopelivitch), who had lived in the area from 1934. The present Mayor of the Tamar Regional Council is Mr. Nir Wanger.

The council today encompasses communal villages, agriculture, factories, tourist sites, and military and civilian installations. Tamar council has a permanent population of 2,300, half of which is Jewish and lives in five communities, and half of which is Arab living in unrecognized communities. Many people from other areas are employed both year-round and seasonally at the Dead Sea Works, the Dead Sea hotel district at Neve Zohar, and numerous other tourist spots like Ein Gedi and Masada. According to the Israel Central Bureau of Statistics (CBS), the total population of the regional council in 2024 was 2,140.

== List of settlements ==
- Ein Gedi (kibbutz)
- Har Amasa (kibbutz)
- Neot HaKikar (moshav)
- Ein Hatzeva (moshav)
- Ein Tamar (moshav)
- Neve Zohar (community settlement)

== Demographics ==
Historical population
Year	Pop.	±%
1972	300	—
1983	800	+166.7%
1995	1,000	+25.0%
2008	1,000	+0.0%
2022	1,577	+57.7%
2024	2,140	+35.7%

== Voting Patterns ==
In the 2022 election, 80 percent of voters in the regional council voted for the parties of the center-left coalition led by Yair Lapid, while 18 percent voted for the parties of the right-wing coalition led by Benjamin Netanyahu and 1 percent voted for the Arab parties.

In the 2026 election, 74 percent of voters in the regional council voted for the parties of the center-left coalition led by Gadi Eisenkot, while 16 percent voted for the parties of the right-wing coalition led by Benjamin Netanyahu and 1.6 percent voted for the Arab parties. An additional 4.6 percent voted for the Reservists, and 2.9 percent voted for Amcha Yisrael. Voter turnout increased 21 percent from the 2022 election.
