= Local government in Israel =

The local governments of Israel (Hebrew: רשות מקומית; also known as local authorities), are the set of bodies charged with providing services such as urban planning, zoning, and the provision of drinking water and emergency services, as well as education and culture, as per guidelines of the Interior Ministry for communities of all sizes in the country. Almost all local governments take one of three forms: city councils, which governs a large municipality, local councils, which governs a small municipality, and regional councils, which governs a group of communities, often but not necessarily of a rural nature.

All Israeli local governments are operated under a strong Mayor–council system. They appoint a head, or mayor, who is selected through a process of democratic elections along with their fellow council members. If a council's operation is impeded by a severe financial crisis, the Interior Minister may dissolve it, fire the council head, and appoint a special commission to operate the council until normalisation. Councils may enact bylaws for improvement of the residents' quality of life, and in addition to the levy of direct taxes, are allocated funds from the national government via the Interior Ministry. City and local councils are united in the framework of the "Centre for Local Government in Israel", founded in 1938, while regional councils are organised in a separate body.

== Roles ==
Local authorities are responsible for providing citizens, firms, and institutions within its jurisdiction with a number of services:

- Physical infrastructure
  - Road system within settlements (intercommunal roads are handled by Netivei Israel)
  - Water supply
  - Refuse collection and disposal
  - Sewage systems
  - Parks
- Environmental protection
  - Public health
  - Nuisances
  - Cleanliness
- Education (joint responsibility with Ministry of Education)
  - Education
    - Construction of schools
    - Provision of equipment
    - Maintenance
- Culture & Sports (financial support and promotion)
  - Libraries
  - Museums
  - Youth clubs
  - Orchestras
  - Theaters
  - Sport facilities
- Social welfare
  - Families in need,
  - Special groups such as the elderly, disabled children, drug addicts

=== Other abilities and responsibilities ===
Local councils in particular have an important role in ensuring the principles put forward in the Planning and Building Law, 5725-1965, are adhered to. The district planning commission is a joint state-local authority which approves detailed local plans and acts as a forum for handling appeals of decisions. The local council is also authorized to issue by-laws in every area in which it has jurisdiction and has the power to enforce these laws as well as the laws and regulations applicable to its functions. Furthermore local authorities are allowed to levy local taxes and collect various payments for services and concessions. They prepare their own budgets, although these then must be approved by the Ministry of the Interior.
