= Neot HaKikar =

Moshav in southern Israel

Neot HaKikar: נאות הכיכר (Hebrew)
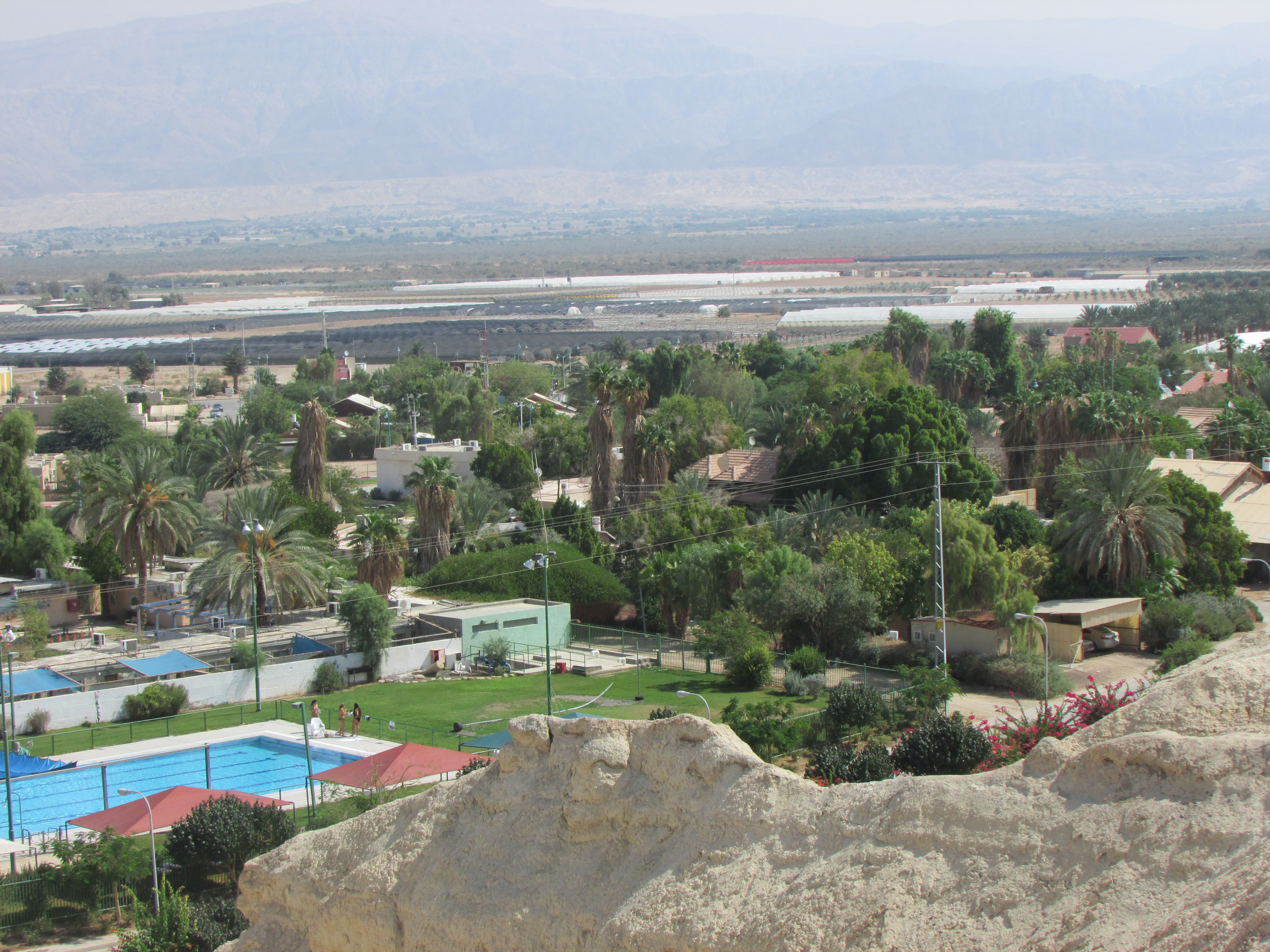

- Location within Northern Negev region of Israel Location within Israel
- Coordinates: 30°55′59″N 35°22′36″E
- Country: Israel
- District: Southern
- Subdistrict: Beersheba
- Council: Tamar
- Affiliation: Agricultural Union
- Founded: 1970
- Population (2024): 485

Neot HaKikar (Hebrew: נאות הכיכר) is a moshav in the northern Arava valley in southern Israel, established in 1970. Located in the south of the Dead Sea, at an elevation of 345 metres (1,132 ft) below sea level, it falls under the jurisdiction of Tamar Regional Council. In 2024 it had a population of 485.

Neot HaKikar was the site of the Neot HaKikar disaster, one of Israel's worst natural disasters.
