= Regional council (Israel) =

Type of local governing body in Israel

Regional councils (plural: Hebrew: מוֹעָצוֹת אֵזוֹרִיּוֹת, Mo'atzot Ezoriyot / singular: Hebrew: מוֹעָצָה אֵזוֹרִית, Mo'atza Ezorit) are one of the three types of Israel's local government entities, with the other two being cities and local councils. As of 2019, there were 54 regional councils, usually responsible for governing a number of settlements spread across rural areas. Regional councils include representation of anywhere between 3 and 54 communities, usually spread over a relatively large area within geographical vicinity of each other.

Each community within a regional council usually does not exceed 2,000 in population and is managed by a local committee. This committee sends representatives to the administering regional council proportionate to their size of membership and according to an index which is fixed before each election. Those settlements without an administrative council do not send any representatives to the regional council, instead being dealt by it directly. Representatives from those settlements which are represented directly are either chosen directly or through an election. The predominant form of communities represented on regional councils are kibbutzim, moshavim, and yeshuvim kehilatiyim.

== List of regional councils ==
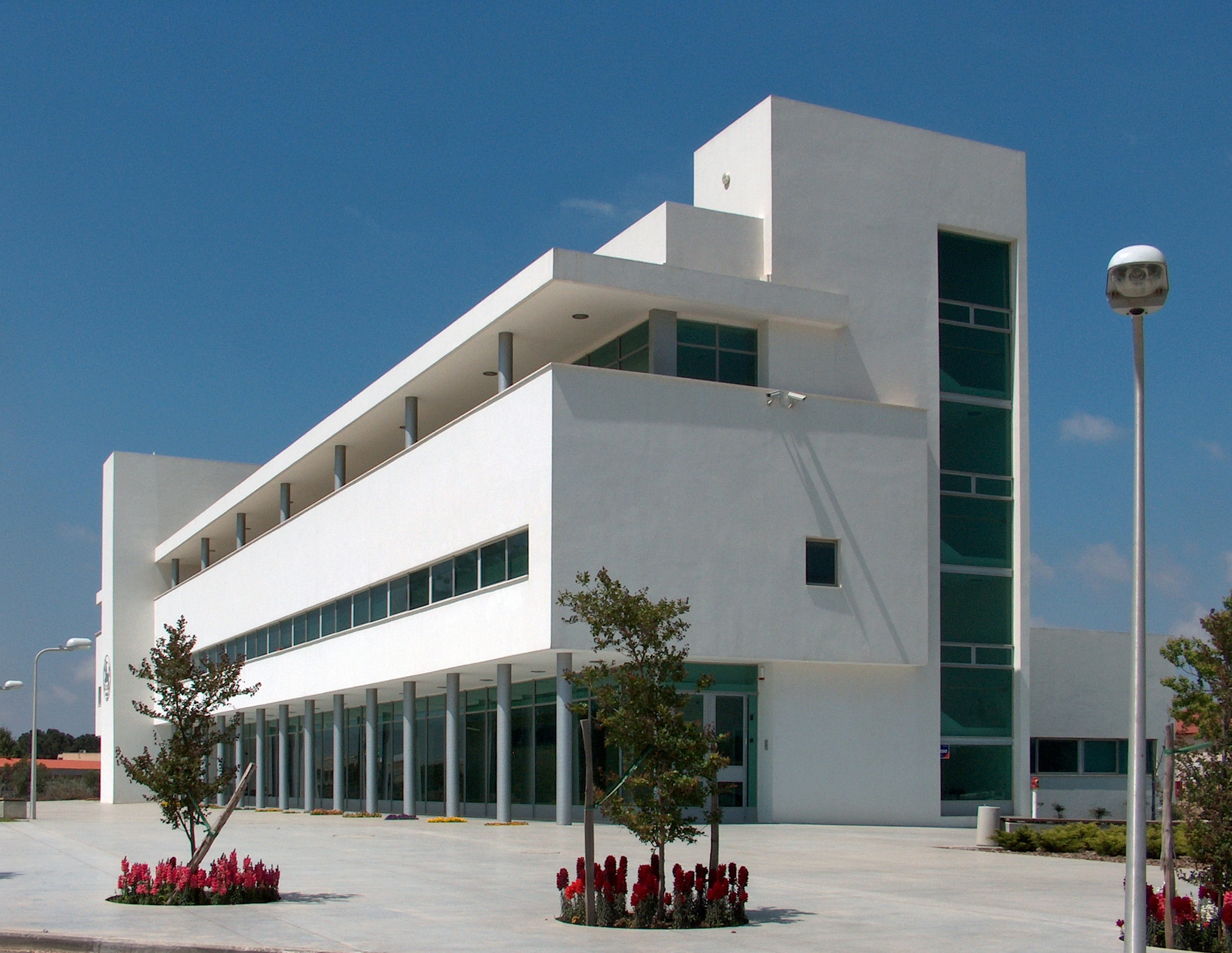
Offices of the Menashe Regional Council

The following sortable table lists all 53 regional councils by name, and the district or area according to the Israel Central Bureau of Statistics.

The list includes the regional councils in the Golan Heights and the West Bank, areas considered occupied territories under international law, although the Israeli government disputes this.

Council	Link	District
al-Batuf Regional Council		Northern
al-Kasom Regional Council		Southern
Alona Regional Council		Haifa
Be'er Tuvia Regional Council		Southern
Bnei Shimon Regional Council		Southern
Brenner Regional Council		Central
Bustan al-Marj Regional Council		Northern
Central Arava Regional Council		Southern
Drom HaSharon Regional Council		Central
Eshkol Regional Council		Southern
Lower Galilee Regional Council		Northern
Upper Galilee Regional Council		Northern
Gan Raveh Regional Council		Central
Gederot Regional Council		Central
Gezer Regional Council		Central
Gilboa Regional Council		Northern
Golan Regional Council		Northern
Gush Etzion Regional Council		Judea and Samaria Area
Har Hevron Regional Council		Judea and Samaria Area
Hefer Valley Regional Council (Emek Hefer)		Central
Hevel Eilot Regional Council		Southern
Hevel Modi'in Regional Council		Central
Hevel Yavne Regional Council		Central
Hof Ashkelon Regional Council		Southern
Hof HaCarmel Regional Council		Haifa
Hof HaSharon Regional Council		Central
Jezreel Valley Regional Council (Emek Yizreel)		Northern
Northern Jordan Valley (Emek HaYarden)		Northern
Southern Jordan Valley (Bik'at HaYarden)		Judea and Samaria Area
Lakhish Regional Council		Southern
Lev HaSharon Regional Council		Central
Ma'ale Yosef Regional Council		Northern
Mateh Asher Regional Council		Northern
Mateh Binyamin Regional Council		Judea and Samaria Area
Mateh Yehuda Regional Council		Jerusalem
Megiddo Regional Council		Northern
Megilot Regional Council		Judea and Samaria Area
Menashe Regional Council		Haifa
Merhavim Regional Council		Southern
Merom HaGalil Regional Council		Northern
Mevo'ot HaHermon Regional Council		Northern
Misgav Regional Council		Northern
Nahal Sorek Regional Council		Central
Neve Midbar Regional Council		Southern
Ramat HaNegev Regional Council		Southern
Sdot Dan Regional Council		Central
Sdot Negev Regional Council (Azata)		Southern
Sha'ar HaNegev Regional Council		Southern
Shafir Regional Council		Southern
Shomron Regional Council		Judea and Samaria Area
Tamar Regional Council		Southern
Valley of Springs Regional Council		Northern
Yoav Regional Council		Southern
Zevulun Regional Council		Haifa

=== Former regional councils ===
Council	District
Abu Basma Regional Council	Southern
Central Sharon Regional Council	
Ef'al Regional Council	Tel Aviv
Ga'aton Regional Council	Northern
Hadar HaSharon Regional Council	Central
Hof Aza Regional Council	Southern
Kiryat Ono Regional Council	
Mif'alot Afek Regional Council	
Na'aman Regional Council	Northern
Northern Sharon Regional Council	Central
Sulam Tzur Regional Council	Northern
Tel Mond Regional Council	
Yarkon Regional Council	

== See also ==
- City council (Israel)
- Local council (Israel)
- Districts (Israel)
