= Ramat HaSharon =

Ramat HaSharon רמת השרון רָמַת הַשָּׁרוֹן
- City (since 2002)

Hebrew transcription(s)
  - ISO 259: Ramat ha Šaron
  - Transliteration: Ramat Ha'Sharon
  - Abbr.: RamHaSh
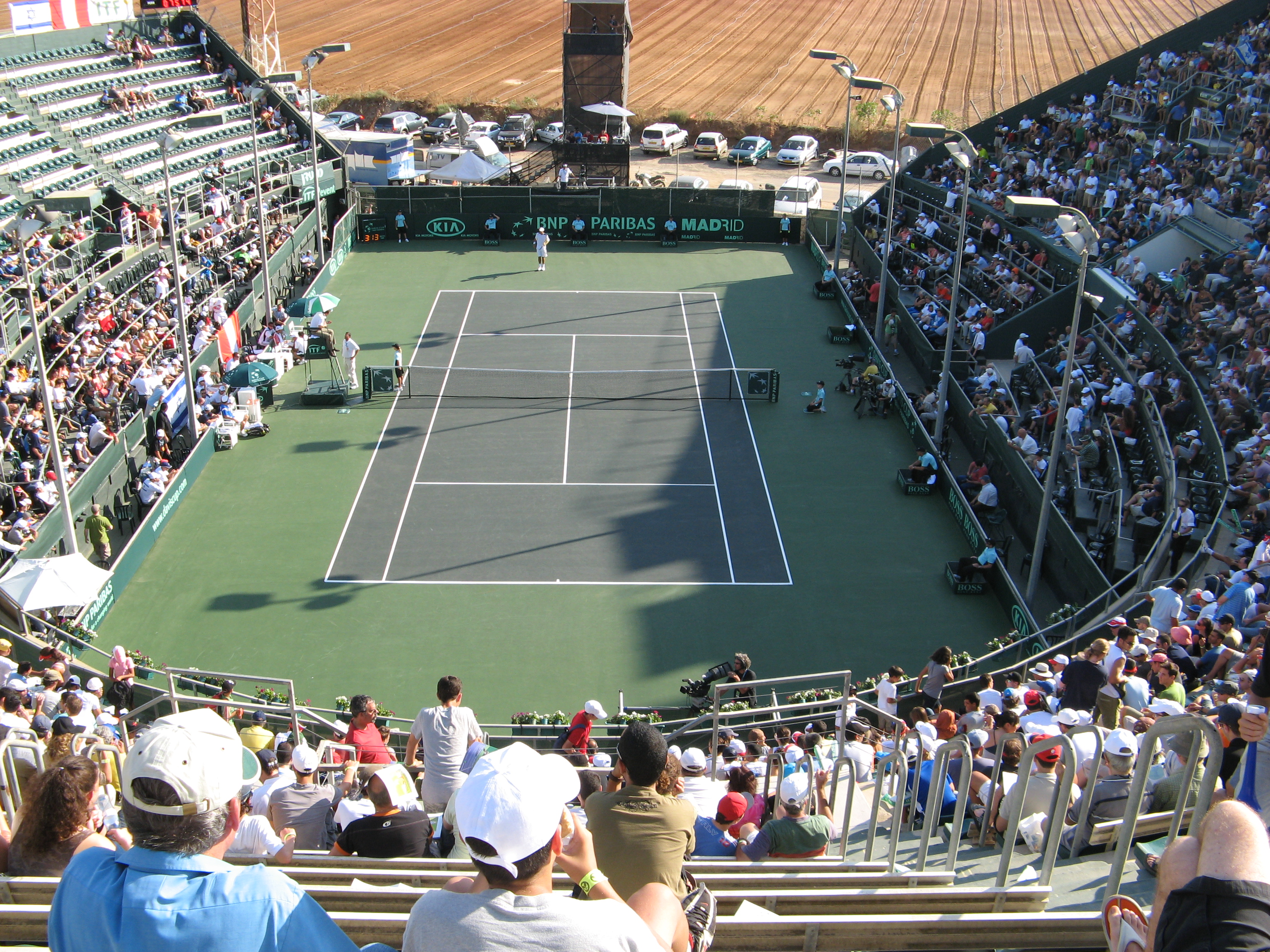
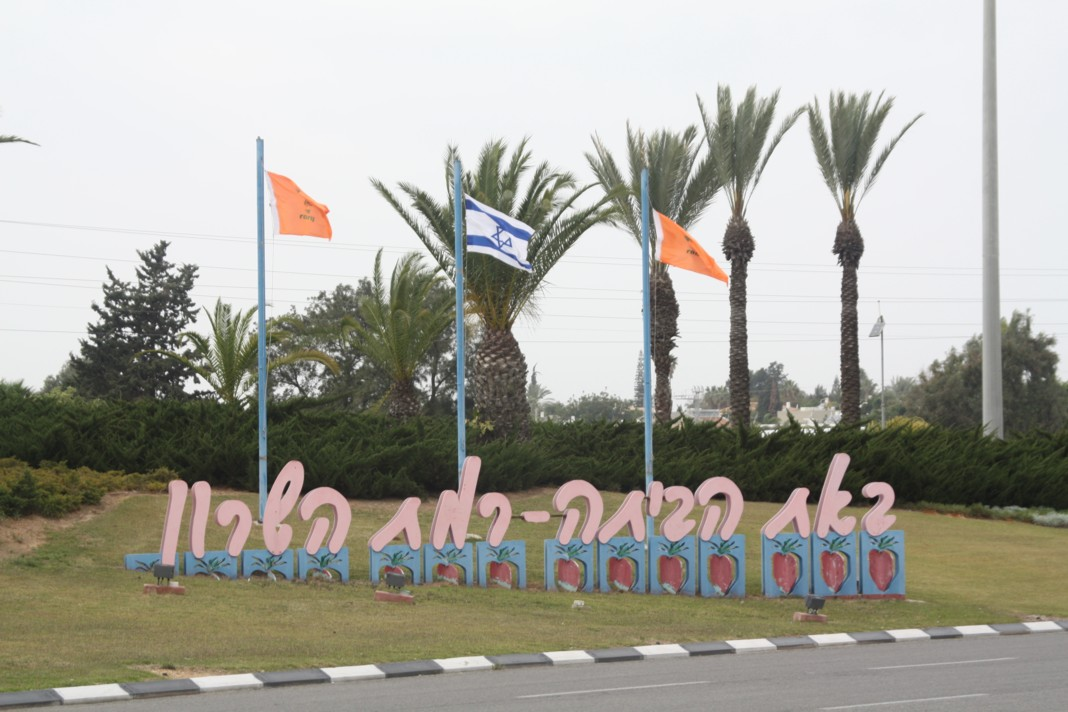
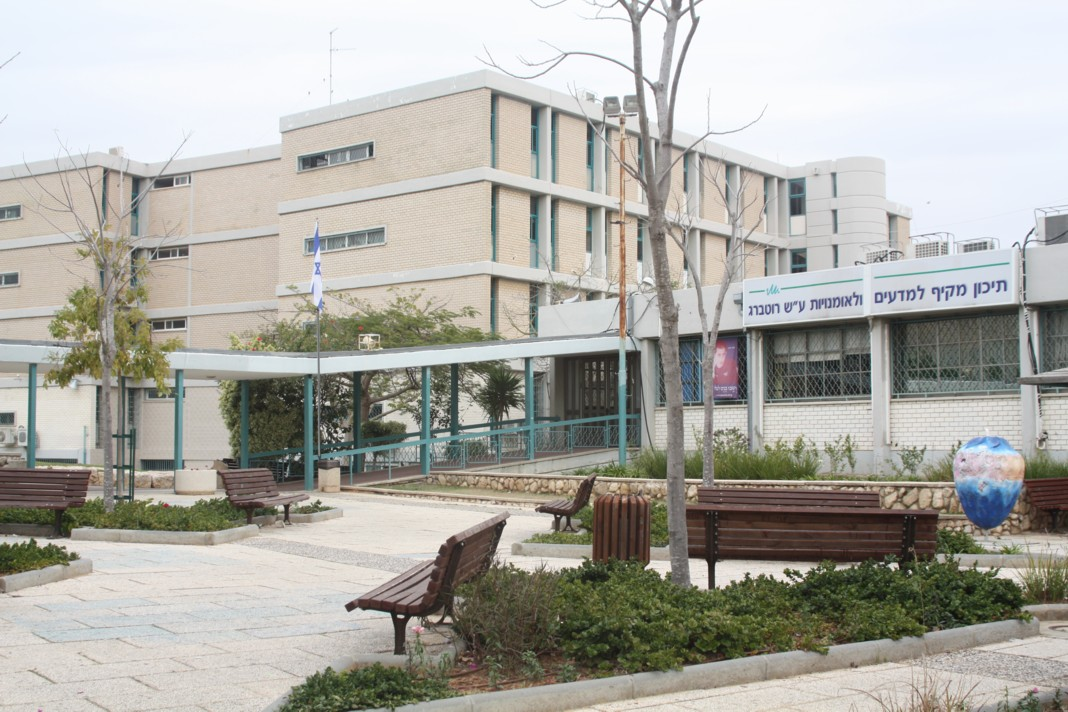
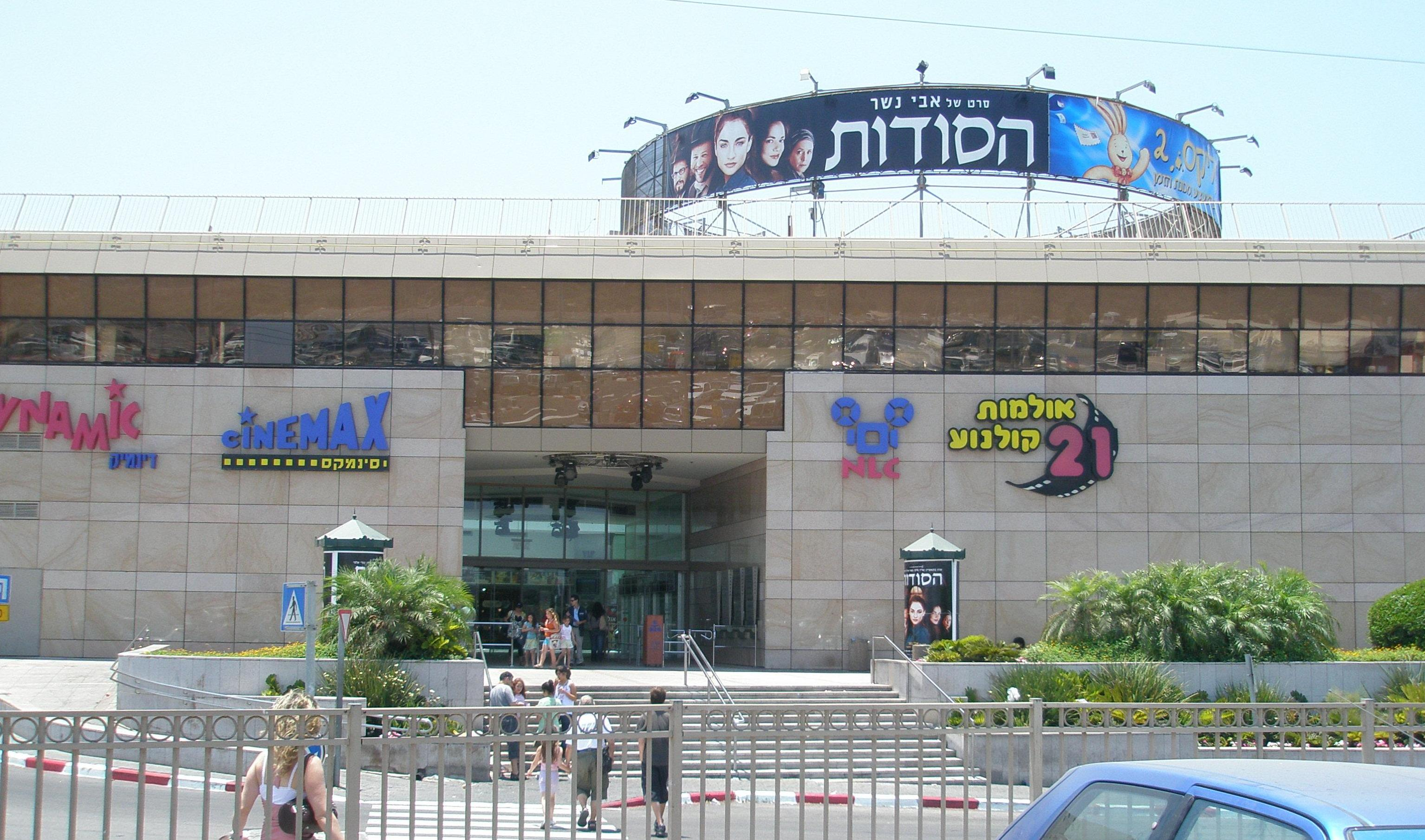
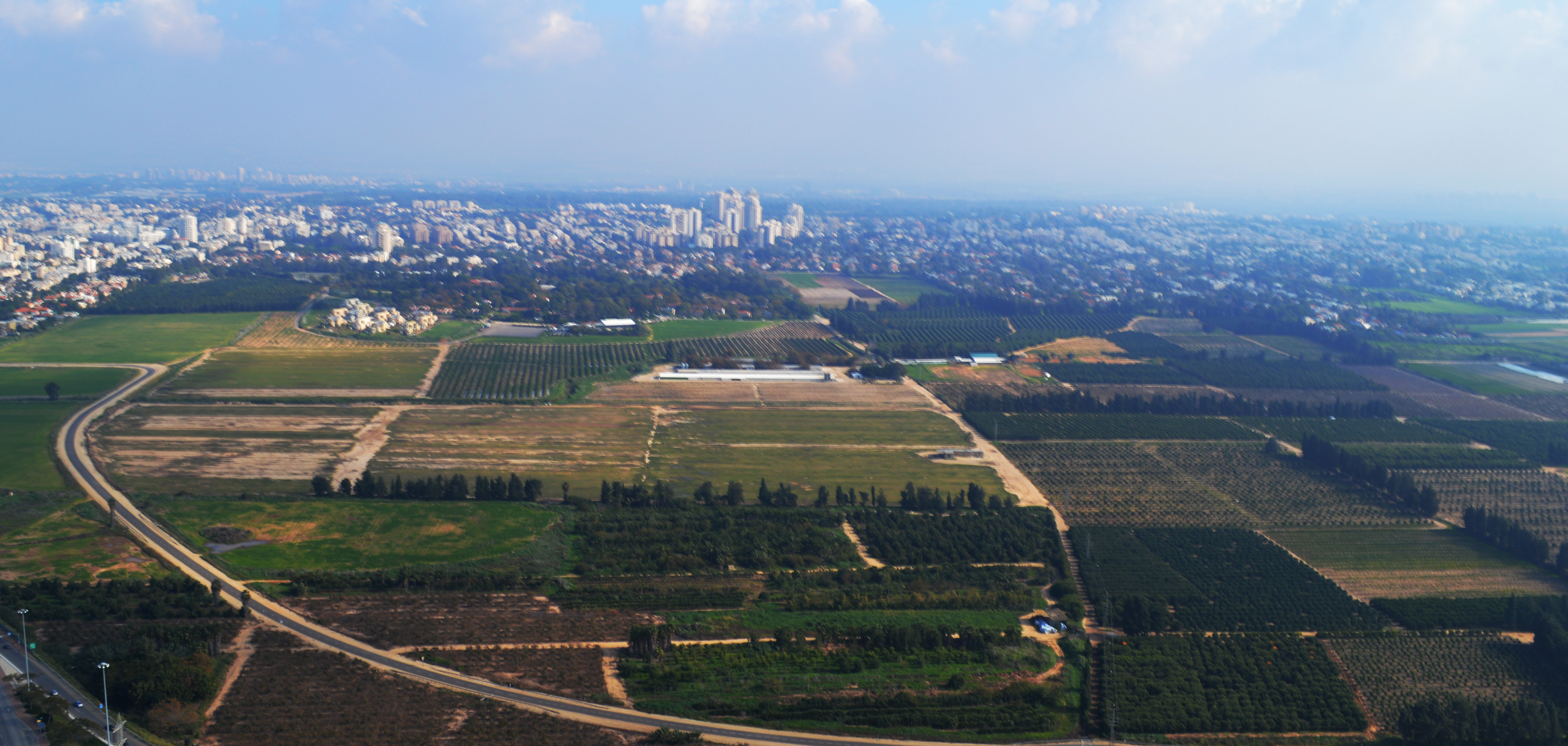
- Clockwise from top left, Canada Stadium, Ramat HaSharon welcome sign, Cinema City, Ramat HaSharon aerial view, Rotheberg High School

- Flag Coat of Arms

- Location within Central Israel Location within Israel
- Coordinates: 32°09′N 34°50′E
- Country: Israel
- District: Tel Aviv
- Natural Region: Tel Aviv
- Founded: 1923; 103 years ago

Government
  - Mayor: Itzhak Rochberger

Area
  - Total: 16,792 dunams (16.792 km^{2}; 6.483 sq mi)

Population (2021)
  - Total: 47,970
  - Estimate: 53,378
  - Density: 2,857/km^{2} (7,399/sq mi)

Ethnicity
  - Jews and others: 99.9%
  - Arabs: 0.1%
- Name meaning: The Sharon Highplain
- Website: ramat-hasharon.muni.il

Ramat HaSharon (Hebrew: רמת השרון, lit. 'The Sharon Highplain', רָמַת הַשָּׁרוֹן) is a city located on Israel's central coastal strip in the south of the Sharon region, bordering the cities of Tel Aviv to the south, Hod-HaSharon to the east, and Herzliya and kibbutz Glil Yam to the north. It is part of the Tel Aviv District, within the Gush Dan metropolitan area. In 2024 Ramat HaSharon had a population of 48,860 and its citizens are nearly entirely Jewish.

== History ==
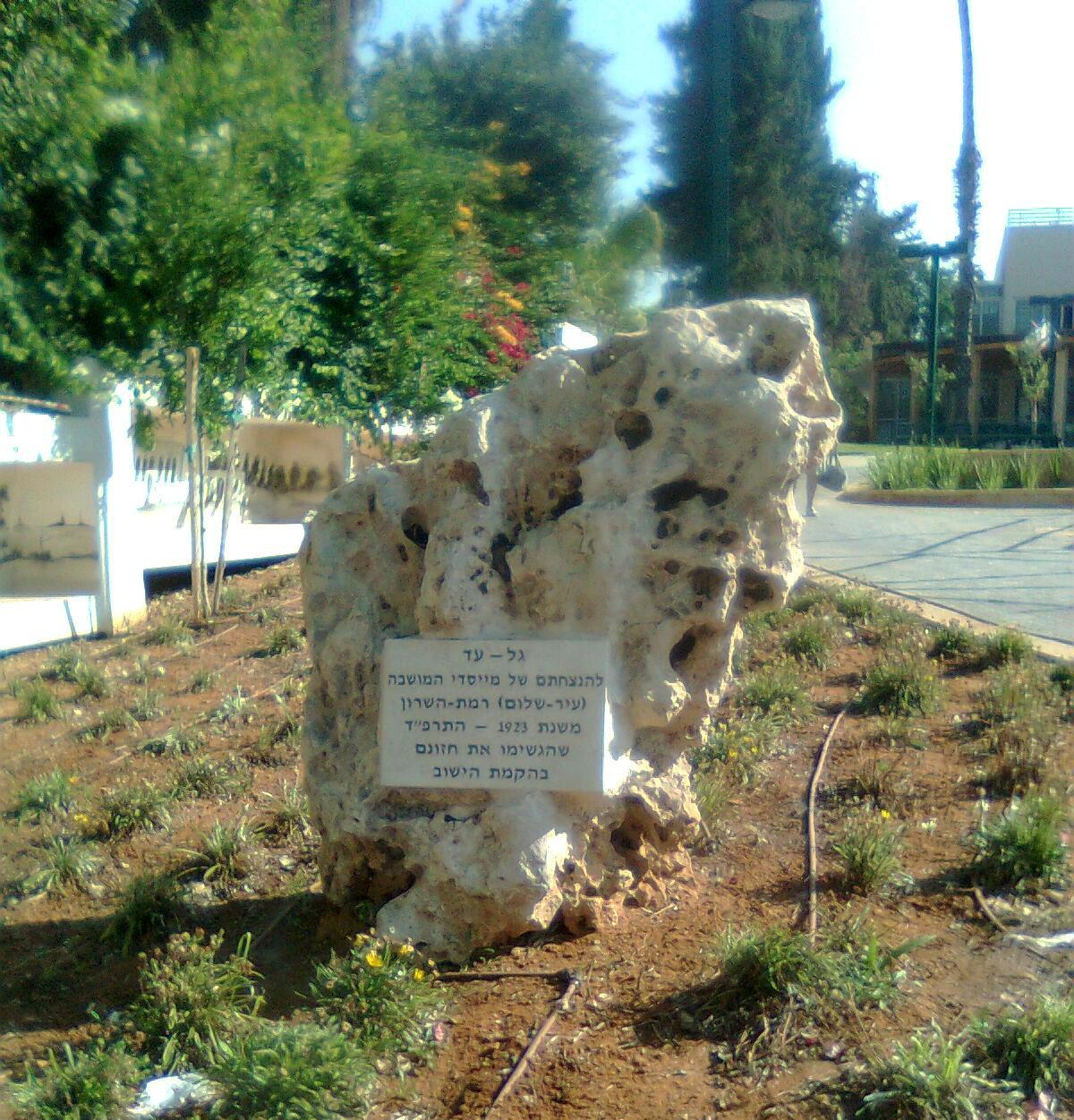
Memorial for the founders the original Ir-Shalom moshava

Ramat HaSharon, originally Ir Shalom (Hebrew: עִיר שָׁלוֹם, lit. City of Peace), was a moshava established in 1923 by olim from Poland. It was built on 2,000 dunams (200 hectares; 500 acres) of land purchased for 5 Egyptian pounds per dunam. In the 1931 census, the village-esque town had a population of 312.

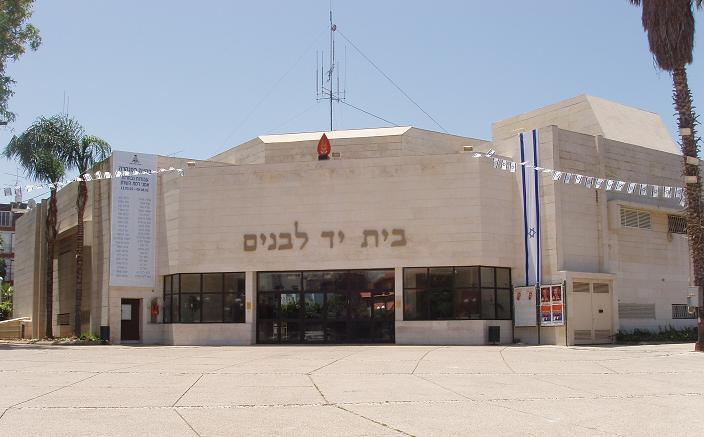
Yad Labanim Memorial and municipal library

In 1932, this Jewish community was renamed Kfar Ramat HaSharon (lit. The Highplain Village of the Sharon [region]). By 1950, the population was up to 900. Rapid population growth in the 1960s and 1970s led to construction of many new roadways, schools and parks. Several distinct neighborhoods evolved in the 1970s, including Morasha on the southern edge, one with many military and air force personnel in the eastern edge, and many successful professionals moved into the developing city. Ramat HaSharon became a highly desirable place to live in the 1980s as a very safe place, containing many gardens and wide boulevards, and attracting many upper middle class suburban families.

While qualifying for city status by number of residents (with more than 30 thousand residents) from the 1980s, Ramat HaSharon's mayors preferred to maintain the local council designation and acted to maintain the character of the settlement by limiting development. Although, Ramat HaSharon was later granted city status in 2002.

=== Archaeology ===
In August 2021, Israeli archaeologists led by Yoav Arbel excavated a Byzantine and Early Islamic settlement at Khirbat el-‘Ora, prior to the establishment of a new neighborhood. The excavation revealed a wine press paved with a mosaic along with a coin minted by Emperor Heraclius. According to coin expert Robert Kool, one side of the gold depicted the emperor and his two sons, while the other side depicted the hill of Golgotha in Jerusalem. A Greek or Aramaic writing was engraved on the surface of the coins, probably with the name of the coin owner. According to Yoel Arbel, stone mortars and millstones were used to grind barley and wheat and very likely also to crush herbs and healing plants.

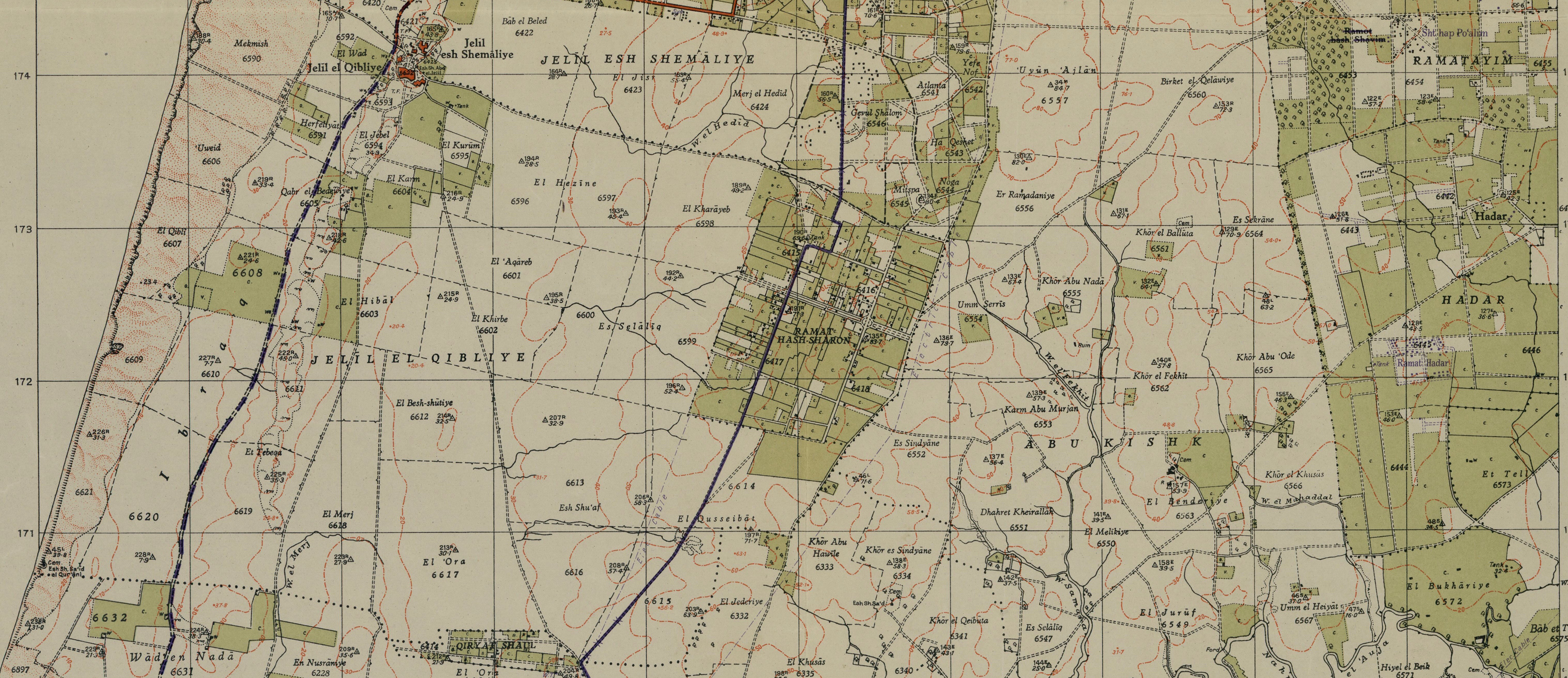
Ramat HaSharon 1942 1:20,000

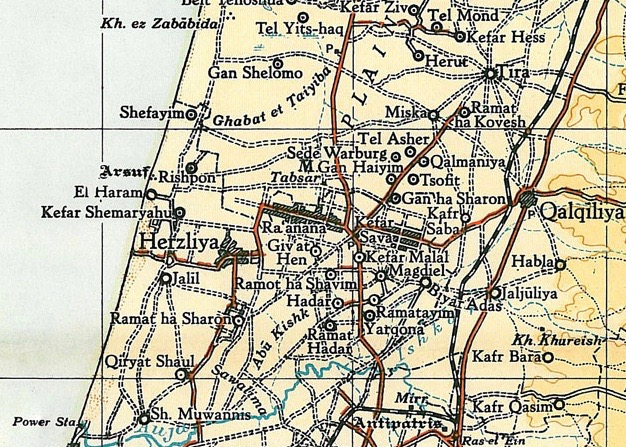
Ramat HaSharon 1945 1:250,000

== Geography ==
The main portion of the city is located north of Highway 5, east of Highway 20 and Glil Yam, to the west of the Israel Military Industries factory and Highway 4, and to the south of Herzliya. The city's administrative boundaries extend in an L-shaped fashion to the south of highway 5 and bordering with Tel Aviv reaching until Highway 2 in the west.

The Neve-Gan neighborhood is disconnected from the rest of the city and is located to the south of the main city, and is adjacent to Kiryat Shaul Cemetery Tel Aviv's Tel Baruch. The Israel Tennis Centers is also south of route 5. The Cinema City Glilot commercial complex is similarly disconnected from the city and is located on the intersection of highway 5 and 2.

The majority of the population lives around the two main streets: "Sokolov" and "Usishkin". in the west. The east in the "Morasha" neighborhood, has no major commercial area, important locations or even a high school. Morasha has long been neglected because of political reasons, though the population hopes they will get more support after a major increase of population, wealth and investments in later years

== Demographics ==
Historical population
Year	Pop.	±%
1972	19,600	—
1983	32,600	+66.3%
1995	36,100	+10.7%
2008	39,000	+8.0%
2022	48,986	+25.6%
2024	48,860	−0.3%

== Economy ==
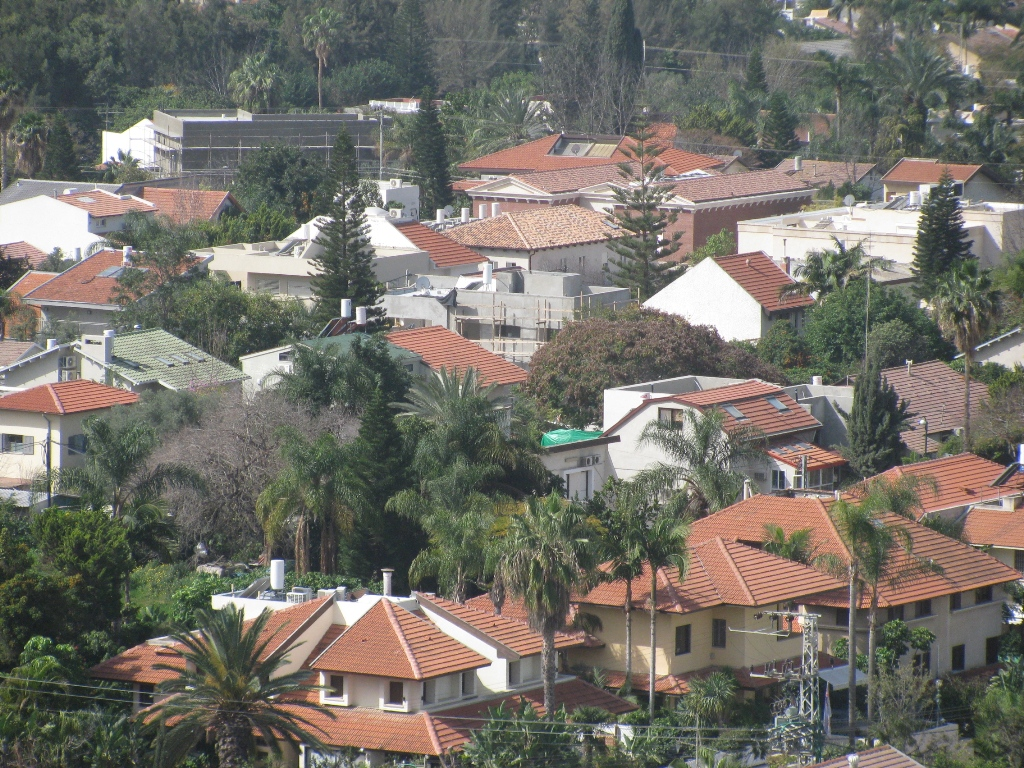
The old colony

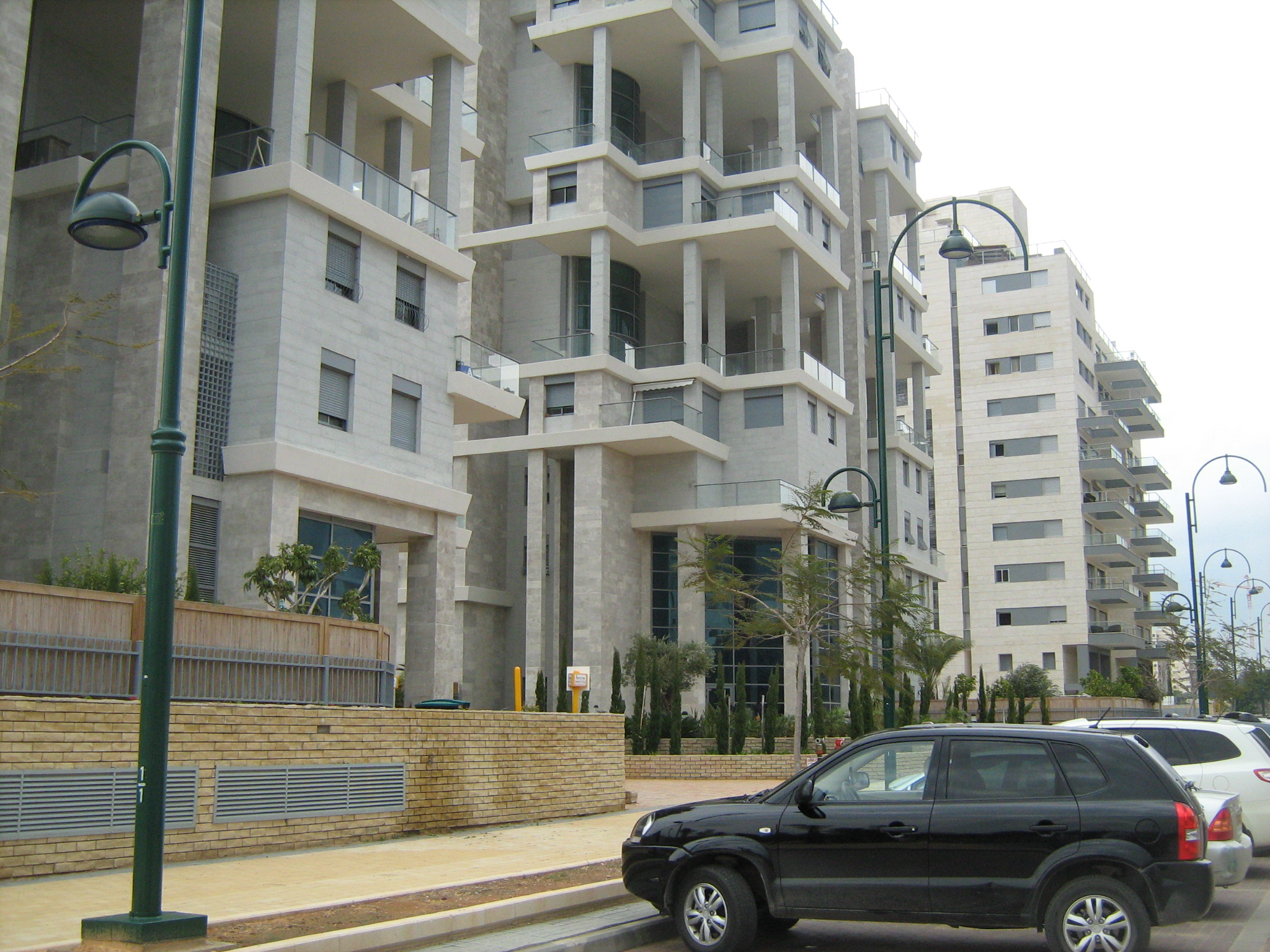
Neve Gan neighborhood

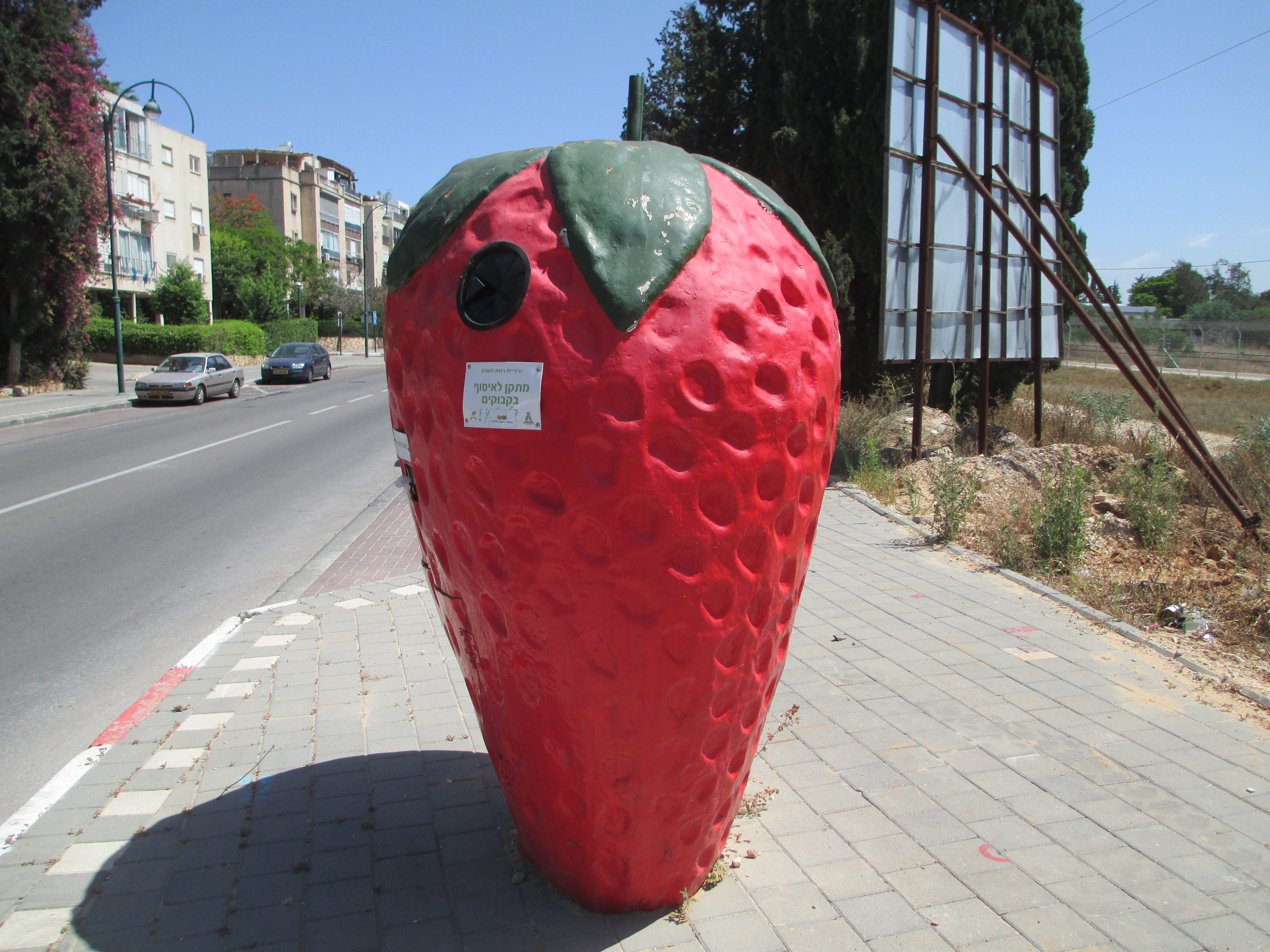
Recycling bins for used bottles designed to look like strawberries are located throughout the city

Until the 1960s, it was primarily a farming community, known for its strawberry fields and citrus groves. Ramat HaSharon is also home to Israel Military Industries, the manufacturer of weapons and small arms for the Israel Defense Forces and the world market.

== Education ==
Ramat Hasharon has seven elementary schools, two middle schools (Alumim, and Kelman), and two high schools (Rothberg, and Alon). Midrasha LoOmanut, an art teachers training college, and Rimon School of Jazz and Contemporary Music are located in the city. The Geology Museum is located in a Bauhaus style building built in 1945.

== Sports ==
Ramat HaSharon is home to the Israel Tennis Center, founded in 1975, which hosts and organizes international, national and regional tennis tournaments. The courts are also widely used during the Maccabiah Games. The ATP World Tour, which had been in Israel from 1987 to 1996, was scheduled to return to the Israel Tennis Center in September 2014 with the Negev Israel Open, but the event was cancelled because of the military conflict in the region. Along with tennis facilities, which include 24 illuminated courts, and stands which seat up to 4,500 spectators, the central management of the organization, which manages 13 other tennis centers around the country, is located in the town. It also is home to Canada Stadium, where most Davis Cup and other significant Israeli tennis matches have been played since the mid-1970s.

Herbalife Ramat HaSharon is the city's women basketball team, one of the leading teams in the Israeli league and a former European champion. The city's football team, Hapoel Ramat HaSharon, plays in Ligat Ha'al, the premiere league of Israeli football. Alumim, one of the city's junior high schools, has won many trophies in sports, especially for achievements in track and field.

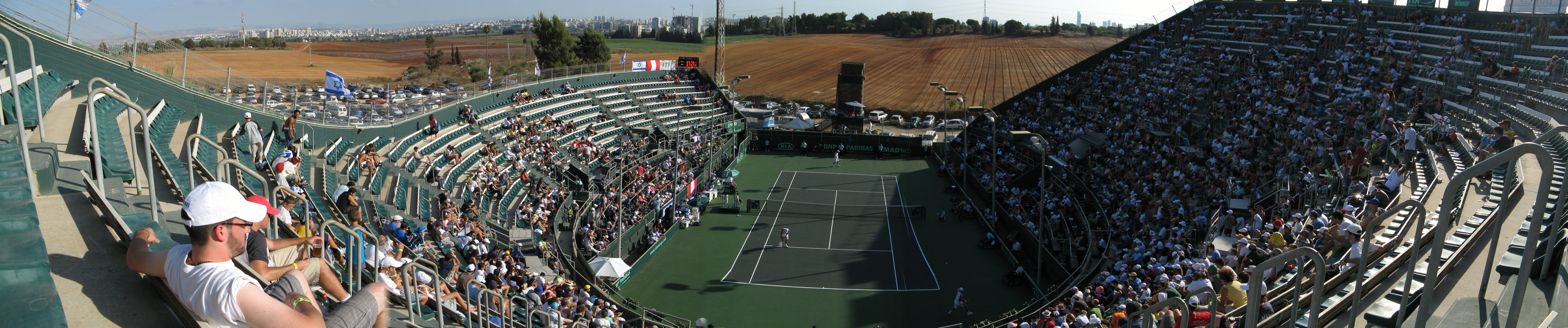
Canada Stadium

== Voting Patterns ==
In the 2022 election, 74 percent of voters in Ramat HaSharon voted for the parties of the center-left coalition led by Yair Lapid, while 24 percent voted for the parties of the right-wing coalition led by Benjamin Netanyahu and 0.5 percent voted for the Arab parties.

In the 2026 election, 77 percent of voters in Ramat HaSharon voted for the parties of the center-left coalition led by Gadi Eisenkot, while 19 percent voted for the parties of the right-wing coalition led by Benjamin Netanyahu and 0.5 percent voted for the Arab parties. An additional 2.1 percent voted for the Reservists, and 0.9 percent voted for Amcha Yisrael. Voter turnout increased 14 percent from the 2022 election.

== Notable people ==
- Chava Alberstein, singer, lyricist, composer, and musical arranger
- Mark Azbel, physicist and human rights defender
- Haim Bar-Lev, Israel Defense Forces Chief of Staff and government minister
- Naya Bienstock (born 2001), actress
- Niv Berkowitz (born 1986), basketball player
- Gilad Bloom (born 1967), tennis player
- Mike Burstyn, Israeli-American actor
- Amnon Dankner (1946–2013), newspaper editor and author
- Shay Doron (born 1985), WNBA basketball guard (New York Liberty)
- Amit Farkash (born 1989), Canadian-born Israeli actress and singer
- Yehoram Gaon, singer, actor, director, producer, and TV and radio host
- Julia Glushko (born 1990), tennis player
- Gidi Gov, singer, TV host, entertainer, and actor
- Rami Kleinstein, singer and composer
- Ofri Lankri (born1991), former tennis player and current wheelchair tennis coach
- Uri Levine (born 1965), entrepreneur who co-founded Waze
- Harel Levy (born 1978), tennis player and Davis Cup team captain; highest world singles ranking # 30
- Sivan Levy (born 1987), singer-songwriter, filmmaker, and actress
- Gigi Levy-Weiss, businessman
- Amos Mansdorf (born 1965), tennis player; highest world singles ranking # 18
- Doron Medalie (born 1977), songwriter, composer and artistic director
- Gal Mekel (born 1988), played for the Dallas Mavericks of the NBA, former NCAA basketball player at Wichita State, 2-time (2011, 2013) Israeli Basketball Super League MVP
- Haim Moshe (born 1955), singer
- Mikaella Moshe (born 2003), Olympic archer
- Yael Naim, French-born singer
- Orna Ostfeld (born 1952), basketball player and coach
- Svika Pick, singer and composer
- Haim Ramon, member of the Knesset and Vice Prime Minister
- Lihie Raz (born 2003), American-born Israeli Olympic artistic gymnast
- Lior Raz (born 1971), actor and screenwriter
- Rita (born 1962), singer and actress
- Anna Smashnova (born 1976), tennis player
- Guy Solomon (born 1977), football goalkeeper
- Dudu Topaz, comedian, actor, author, and TV and radio host
- Ezer Weizman, commander of the Israeli Air Force, Minister of Defense, and President of Israel
- Shelly Yachimovich (born 1960), politician
- Eli Yatzpan, TV host and comedian
- Rehavam Zeevi, general, politician, and historian
- Yuval Zellner (born 1978), politician
- Naor Zion, comedian, actor, writer and director

== Twin town and sister cities ==
Ramat HaSharon is twinned with:

- Dunkerque, France (since 15 September 1997)
- Saint-Maur-des-Fossés, France
- Georgsmarienhütte, Germany
- Tallahassee, Florida, United States

== See also ==
- Archaeology of Israel
- 2021 in archaeology
