= Ha Bassa =

Coordinates: 32.171°N 34.823°E

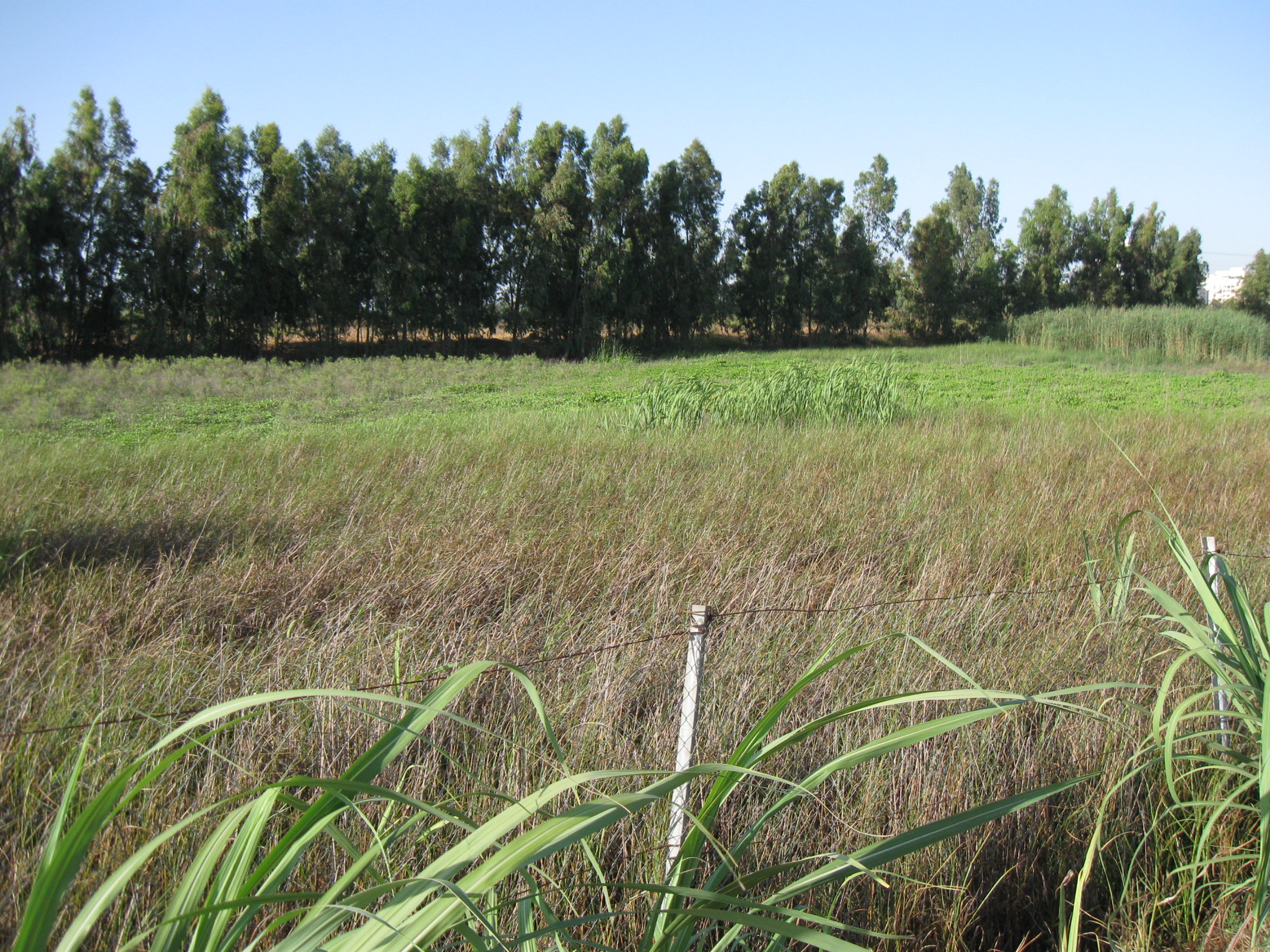
Herzliya winter swamp

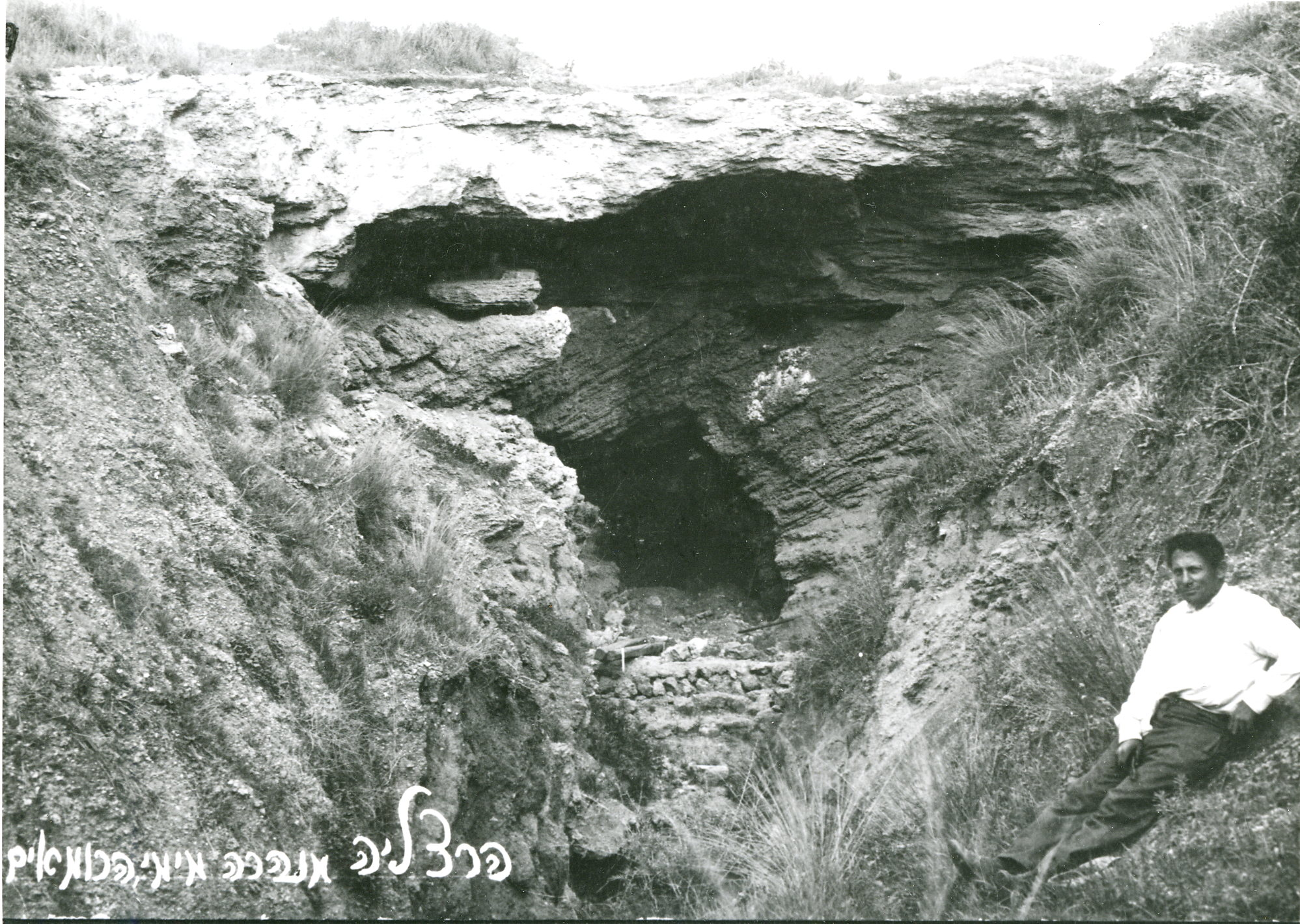
The tunnel entrance in the 1920s

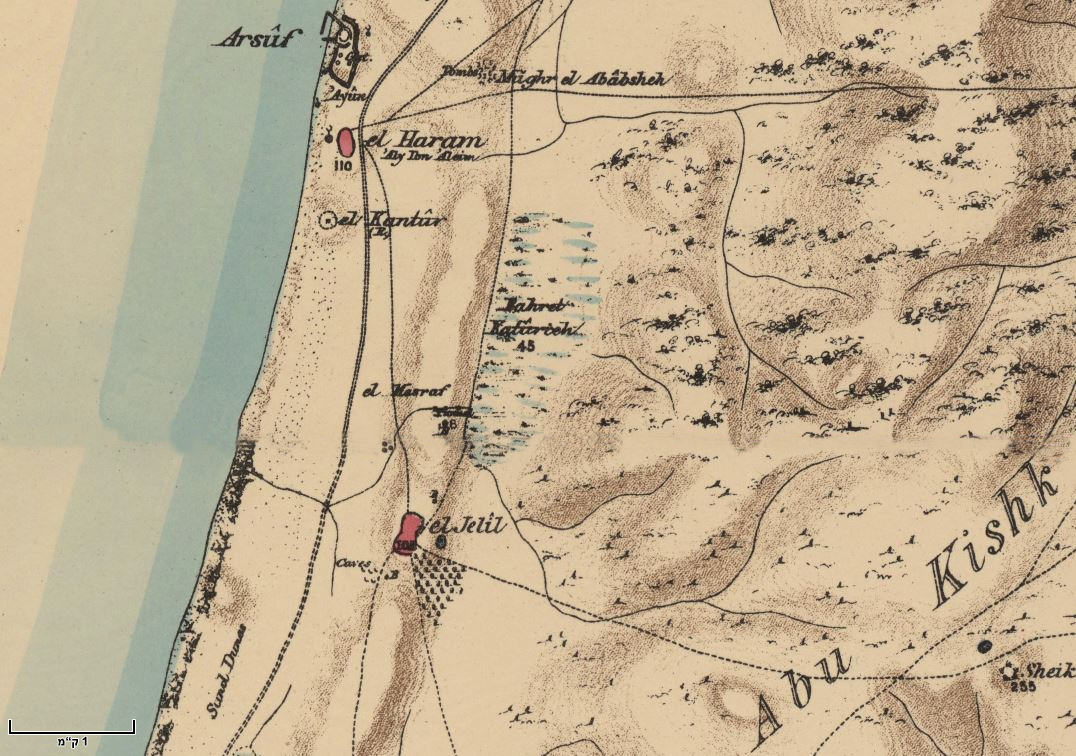
The Bassa on the Palestine Exploration Fund map, 1880

HaBassa (from Arabic bassa, meaning "swamp"), formerly known as Bahret Katurieh, is a Vernal pool in Herzliya, Israel. The Bassa area is a low-lying basin situated between the kurkar ridges of Kfar Shmaryahu and the city of Herzliya. In the first decade of the 21st century, most of the Bassa area was converted into an urban park, now known as Herzliya Park.

== The Roman tunnel ==
During the Byzantine period, attempts were made to drain the swamp waters into the sea by means of a tunnel approximately 190 metres long and about 2 metres high, excavated through the kurkar ridge to exploit the fertile swamp soils for agriculture. The tunnel drained the water toward the Mediterranean Sea via Galilot Stream. Over the years, the tunnel became blocked, and the swamp returned to its original size about 1.5 kilometres in length and roughly half a kilometre in width.

In 1931, the tunnel, commonly referred to as the "Roman tunnel", was used by the Haganah as a site for shooting practice and training. Today, the tunnel serves as a habitat for bats, and parts of its walls have collapsed. The western entrance of the tunnel can be seen from Highway 2, approximately 900 metres north of the HaSira Interchange, on the eastern side of the road. Tunnel Street in Herzliya is named after its proximity to the tunnel.

== The Bassa ==
The Bassa was located between the Arab villages of Ajlil to the south and al-Haram to the north. In 1922, the site was identified by British Army health authorities as one of the most severe malaria foci in the region, together with the swamp at the Galilot Junction.

Following the British capture of the area, emergency measures were undertaken to eradicate Anopheles mosquitoes, and the swamp was partially drained. Only with the establishment of Herzliya and the reopening of the Roman tunnel did the permanent swamp disappear, and the land was converted into agricultural fields. During the 1980s, some of these agricultural plots were abandoned, and a small portion of the original swamp area reverted into a seasonal pond that fills during winter and dries up in summer. Poor drainage in the area has led to flooding of nearby roads during periods of heavy rainfall.

== Herzliya Park ==
In the first decade of the 21st century, most of the Bassa area was transformed into an urban park. Part of the winter pond was preserved in its natural state as an element of the park landscape.
