= Sportek Herzliya =

Sports venue in Herzliya, Israel

Coordinates: 32°10′12.68″N 34°49′41.16″E

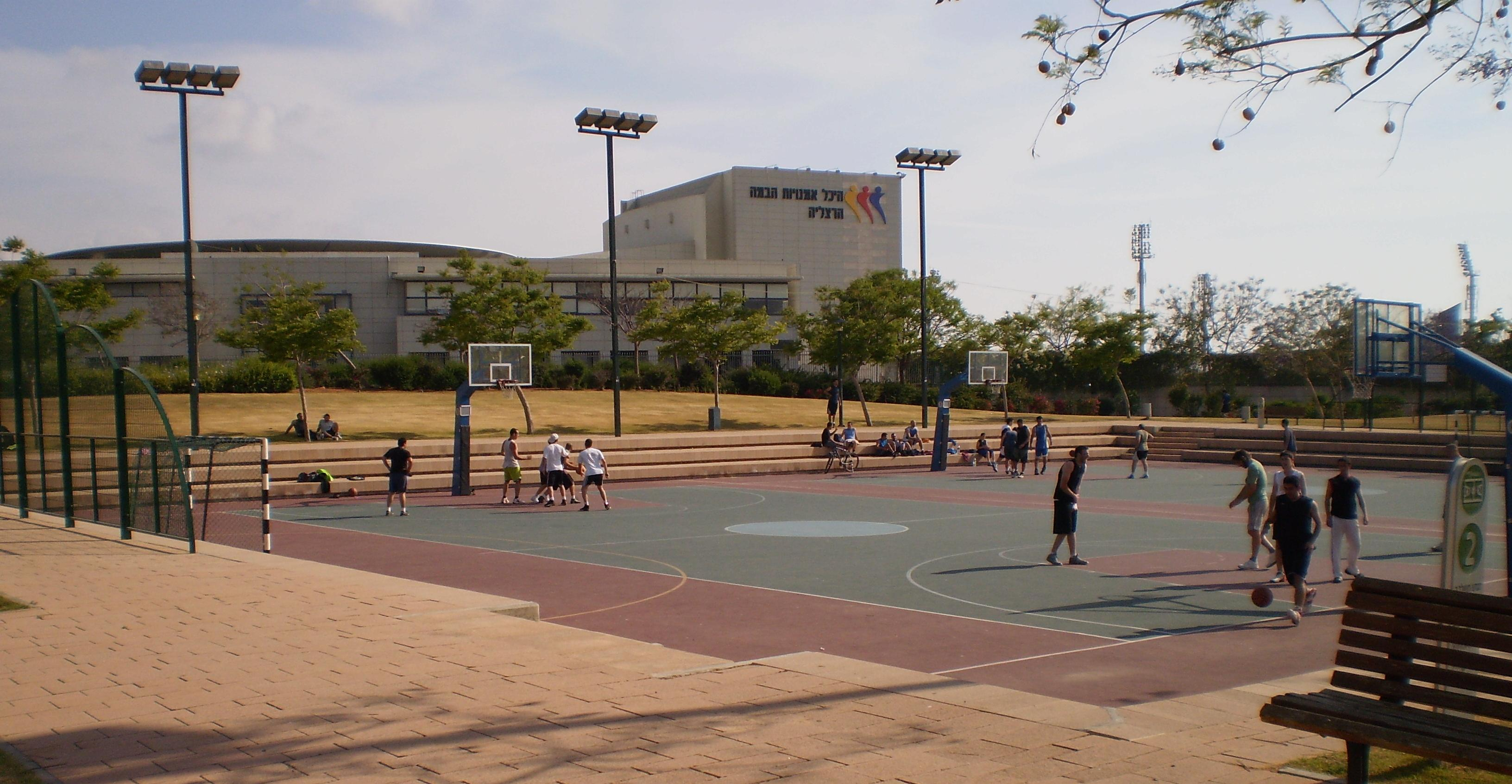
A combined soccer and basketball court in Sportek Herzliya. In the background: Performing Arts Center.

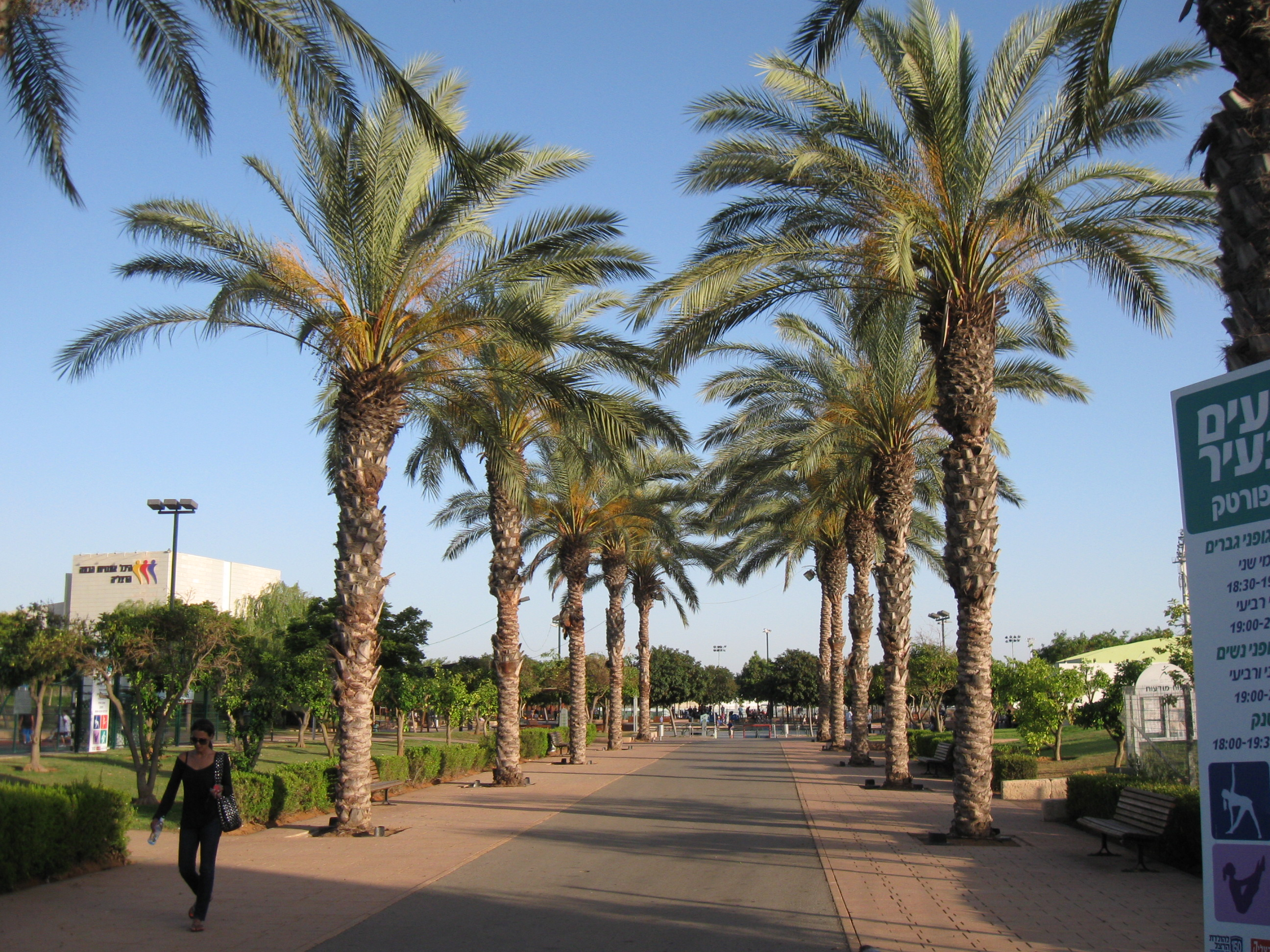
A palm avenue in Sportek Herzliya.

Sportek Herzliya is a 120 dunam sports outdoor compound in Herzliya, Israel. It is one of Herzliya's main attractions.

Building the Sportek was finished in 2011, and it became open to the public in January 2002. It was designed by the landscape architecture company Zur Wolf. The compound consists of several multifunctional playing courts, built for futsal (soccer) and basketball playing, and in total has 13 basketball hoops, along with playgrounds, grass lawns, ping pong tables, a cafeteria, exercise machines, a walking track and a roller skating surface. On Saturdays, organized folk dance events are being held in the roller skating area, and occasional dancing events are being held also in midweek.

In 2011, a decade after the Sportek's opening, the "Herzliya Skatepark", a skateboarding track, was opened as the southern complex of the Sportek. The skating park was also designed by Zur Wolf offices.

In the northwest edge of the compound, the youth club "Hakohav Hashmini" ("The Eighth Star") is situated.

The complex borders the Performing Arts Center and the Israeli Air Force House in the southeast, Herzliya Municipal Stadium in the south, and Herzliya Park in the west.

During July and August, the annual events of "Midnight Sports" are being held in Sportek Herzliya, which involve nightly sports events and activities for the youth.
