= Herzliya =

Herzliya הרצליה (Hebrew)
- City

Hebrew transcription(s)
  - ISO 259: Herçliya
  - Translit.: Hertzliya
  - Also spelled: Herzliyya (official)
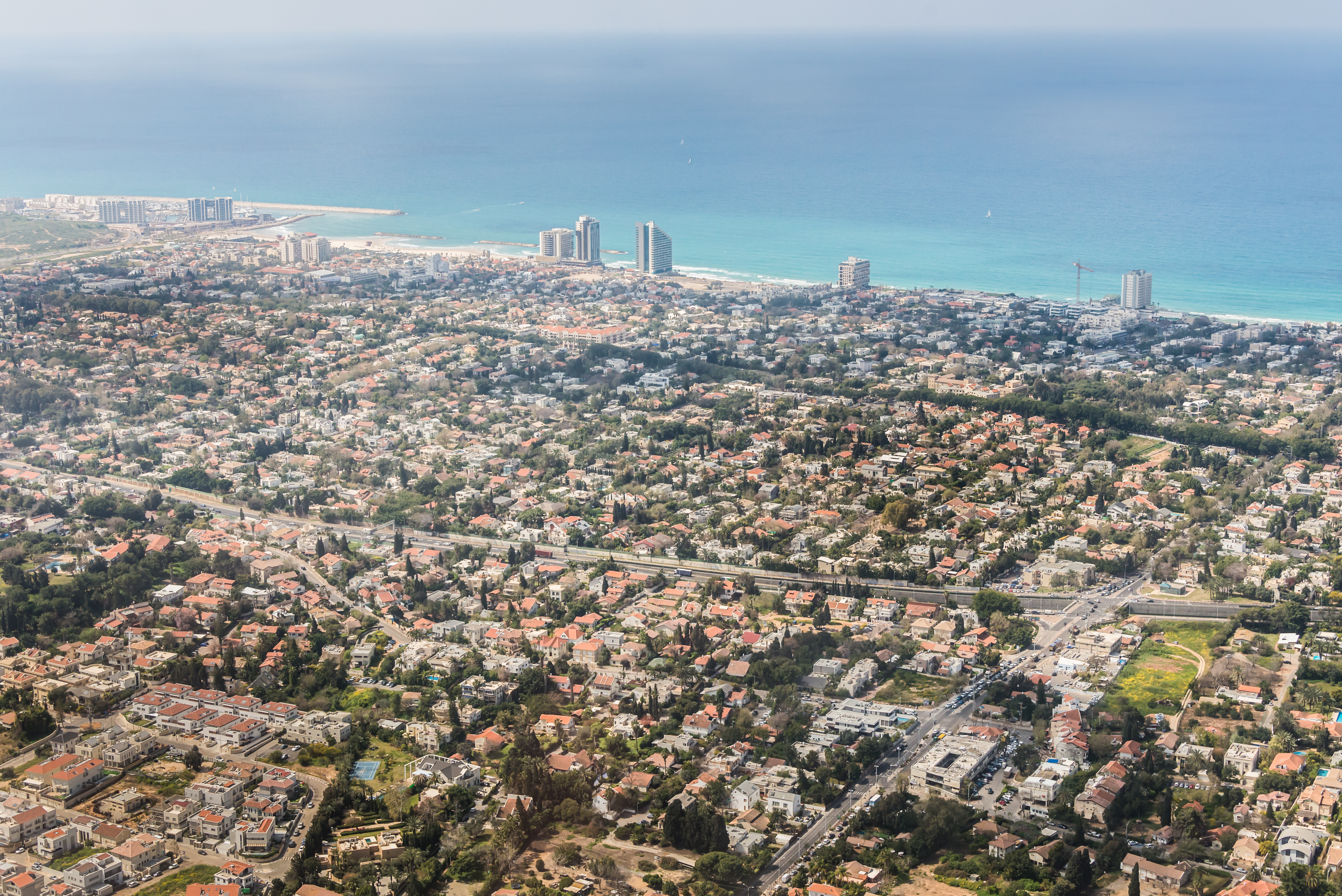
- View of Herzliya

- Flag Coat of arms

- Location within Central Israel Location within Israel
- Coordinates: 32°09′55″N 34°50′45″E
- Country: Israel
- District: Tel Aviv
- Natural Region: Tel Aviv
- Founded: 1924

Government
  - Type: Mayor–council
  - Body: Municipality of Herzliya
  - Mayor: Yariv Fisher

Area
  - Total: 21,585 dunams (21.585 km^{2}; 8.334 sq mi)

Population (2024)
  - Total: 110,884
  - Density: 5,137.1/km^{2} (13,305/sq mi)

Ethnicity
  - Jews and others: 99.8%
  - Arabs: 0.2%
- Time zone: UTC+2 (IST)
  - Summer (DST): UTC+3 (IDT)
- Name meaning: Named for Theodor Herzl
- Website: www.herzliya.muni.il

Herzliya (/hɜːrtsˈliːjə/ hurts-LEE-yə; Hebrew: הרצליה, pronounced [heʁts(e)liˈja] / [eʁtseˈlija]) is an affluent city on the central coast of Israel, at the northern part of the Tel Aviv District. It is known for its startup and entrepreneurial culture. In 2024, it had a population of 110,884.

Named after Theodor Herzl, the founder of modern Zionism, Herzliya covers an area of 21.6 km^{2} (8.3 sq mi). Its western, beachfront area is called Herzliya Pituah and is one of Israel's most affluent neighborhoods and home to numerous embassies, ambassadors' residences, company headquarters, and houses of prominent Israeli business people.

== History ==
Herzliya, named after Theodor Herzl, was founded in 1924 as a semi-cooperative farming community (moshava) with a mixed population of new Jewish immigrants to Palestine and veteran residents. During that year, 101 houses and 35 cowsheds were built there, and it continued to grow. The 1931 census recorded a population of 1,217 inhabitants, in 306 houses.

On 3 February 1948, early in the 1948 Arab–Israeli War, the population of Al-Haram fled out of fear, after Haganah or Irgun attacks on nearby villages.

A makeshift strip located around the current Herzliya Airport was used as the main operating base of Israel's first true fighter aircraft (as opposed to makeshift use of light planes), Avia S-199, during the 1948 Arab–Israeli War. The airfield was used as it was a bit back from the front lines and was clandestine since it was a purpose-built strip that was constructed after the beginning of hostilities, between the orange orchards around Herzliya, and did not appear on published maps.

Upon the Israeli Declaration of Independence on 14 May 1948, Herzliya was a town of approximately 5,300 residents. Large numbers of immigrants settled there, and it reached 12,000 residents within a few years. In 1960, when the population reached 25,000, Herzliya was declared a city.

On 11 March 1978, a bus hijacking by Fatah led to the Coastal Road Massacre, in which 38 Israeli civilians were killed at the Glilot Junction near Herzliya.

On June 11, 2002, Hadar Hershkowitz (14) was killed in the 2002 Herzliya shawarma restaurant bombing. On 27 December 2024, Ludmila Lipovsky (83), a Holocaust survivor, was stabbed to death outside a nursing home in Herzliya by a Palestinian man from Tulkarm. After having pleaded guilty, the man was sentenced in 2026 to life imprisonment, as well as to pay the maximum compensation to the victim's family allowed, NIS 258,000.

On 27 March 2026, the Dan Accadia Resort was damaged by a missile strike during the 2026 Iran war.

Under current city development plans, the city's population is projected to triple to approximately 290,000 residents by 2030. This rapid expansion will be facilitated by the construction of 52,000 new homes, alongside significant new industrial developments and hotel construction. The plan outlines a denser construction in the existing city center, while also expanding the city limits towards the north and southwest.

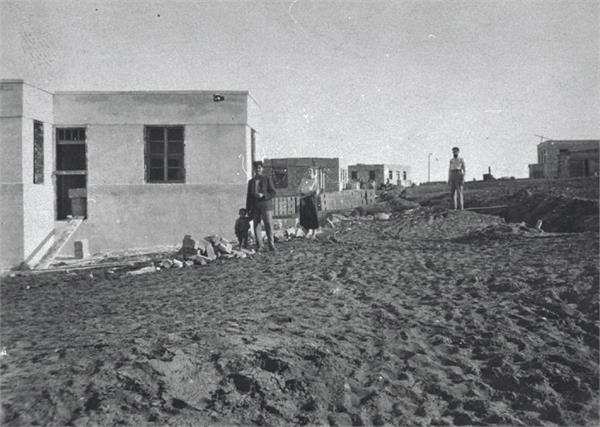
Herzliya under construction 1920

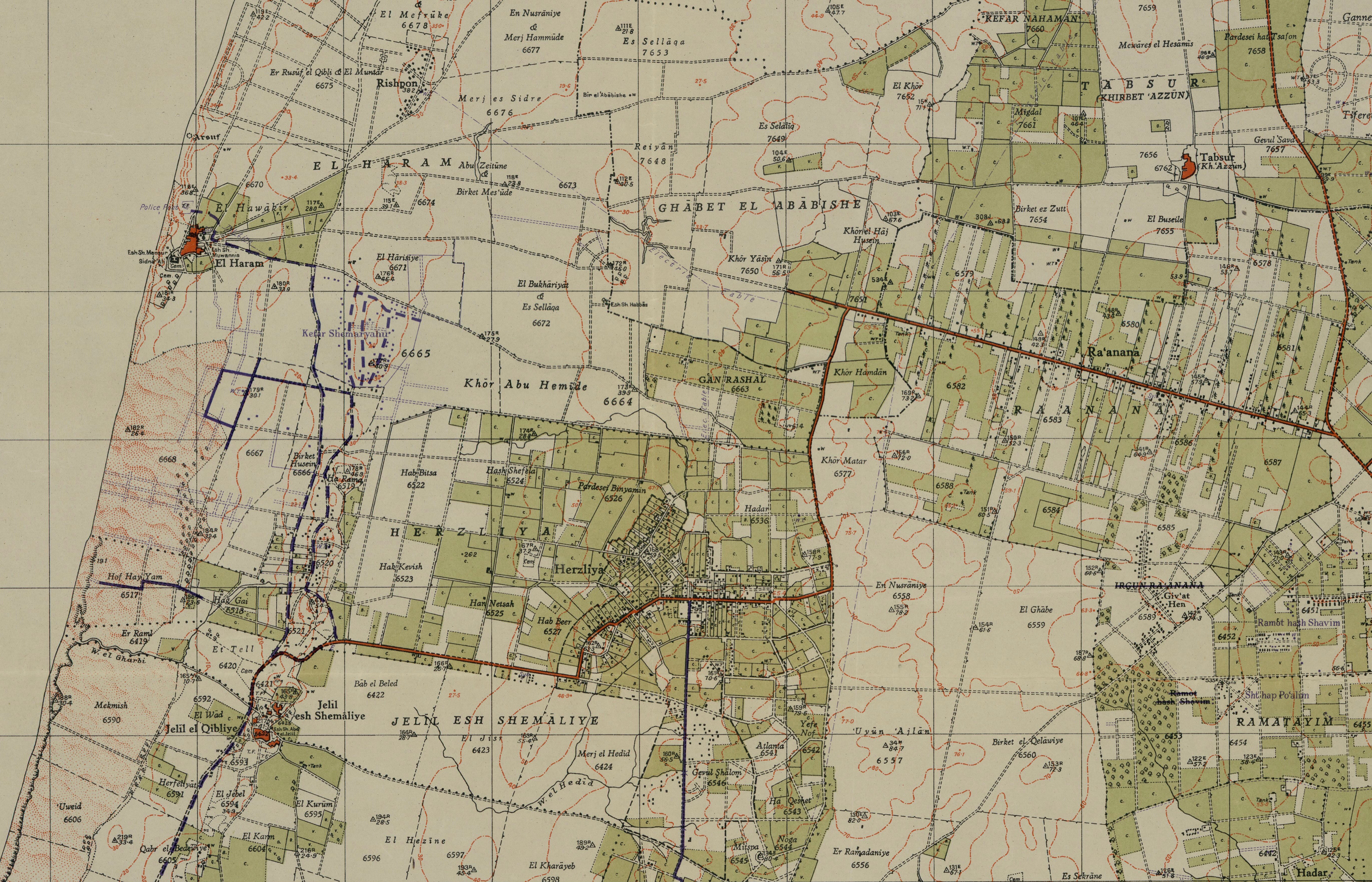
Herzliya 1942 1:20,000

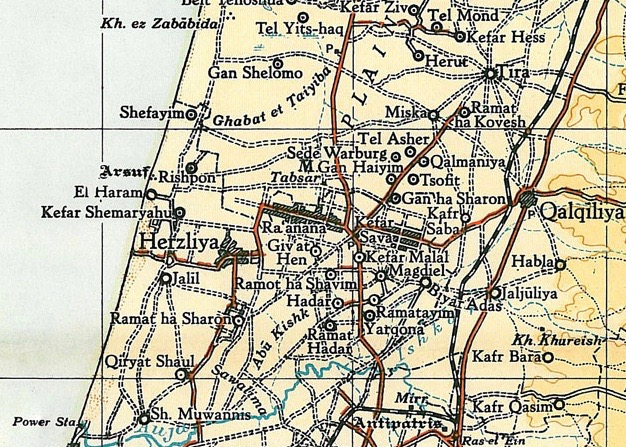
Herzliya 1945 1:250,000

Herzliya in 1964, with the Central Bus Station in the foreground

== Demographics ==
Historical population
Year	Pop.	±%
1972	41,500	—
1983	62,900	+51.6%
1995	82,700	+31.5%
2008	86,300	+4.4%
2022	105,273	+22.0%
2024	110,885	+5.3%

According to the Israel Central Bureau of Statistics, residents of Herzliya are among the wealthiest in Israel. In 2003–2005, average monthly salaries were ILS 8,211, or about ILS 1,500 above average in a survey of Israel's 15 largest cities.

There is a large gap between the city's seven working-class neighborhoods (among them Yad Tisha, Neve Yisrael and Neve Amal) and upscale Herzliya Pituah. The population is older compared with other cities in the Sharon region and the national average. In 2008, 18% of Herzliya's residents were under 14 years old, compared to a national average of 27.5%.

In 2024, according to the Central Bureau of Statistics, Herzliya had the highest median household income and the lowest housing density of all cities in Israel.

== Education and culture ==
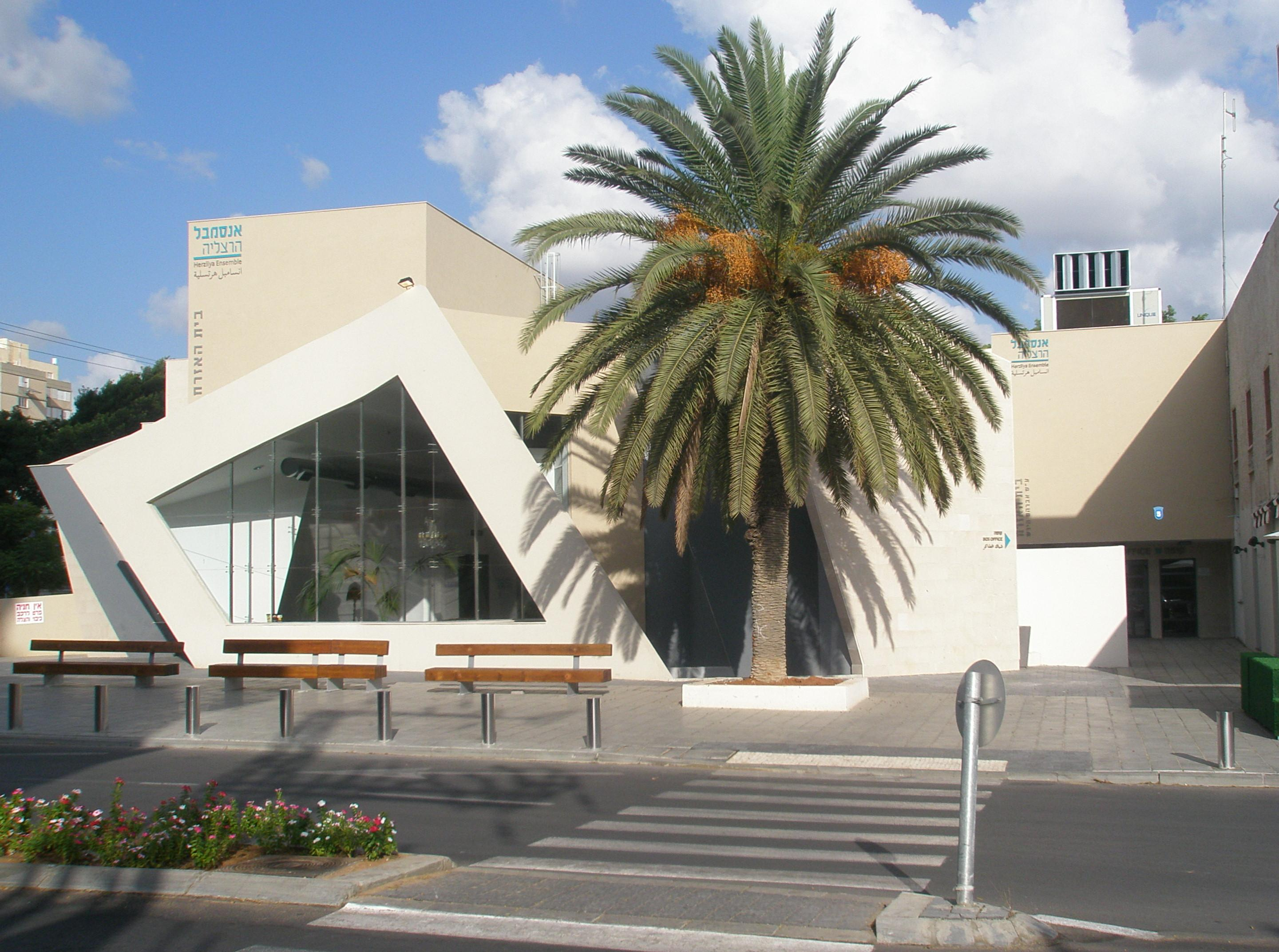
Herzliya ensemble concert hall

Investment in education in Herzliya was higher compared with all other cities surveyed, which resulted in a higher number of high school students being eligible for a bagrut matriculation certificate. Herzliya is also home to Reichman University (formerly The Herzliya Interdisciplinary Center), Israel's only private university. It was founded in 1994 by Uriel Reichman and is located in the Tel Aviv District. The institution was rebranded in 2021.

Herzliya serves as a significant center for media and infrastructure within Israel. It is the location of Herzliya Studios (Ulpanei Herzliya), Israel's largest television and film studio. The city also hosts RGE studios, which provide services for the Kids Channel and Sport 5 Channel. Herzliya also accommodates the IDC television and radio center.

The Herzliya Marina was constructed in the 1990s. Herzliya's civic infrastructure includes a small airport, three shopping malls (Arena Mall, Seven Stars Mall, and The Outlet), movie theaters, museums, cultural centers, and a stadium. The Herzliya Cinematheque initially opened in the downtown area in 2008, relocating in 2023 to a new site within the town hall building at 22 Ben Gurion Street. The Herzliya Museum of Contemporary Art opened in its current location on Ha'banim Street in 1975.

== Local government ==
In a 2008 survey of 15 Israeli cities, Herzliya ranked second in fiscal management. The Herzliya municipality ended 2006 with a sizeable budget surplus.

=== Mayors ===
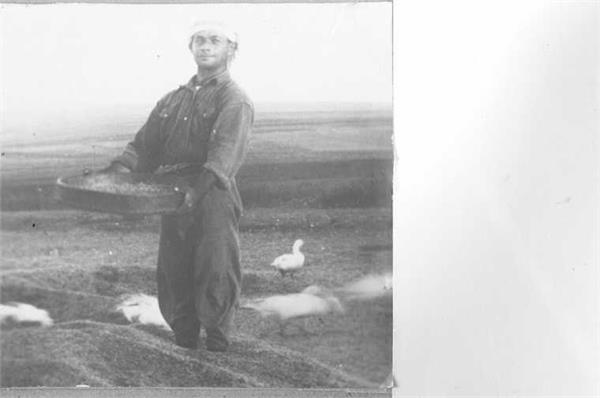
Ben Zion Michaeli 1920

- Avraham Raphael Hirsch, 1937–38
- Shmuel Zeev ("Shin-Zayin") Levin, 1938–43
- Ben Zion Michaeli, 1943–60
- Pesah Yifhar, 1960–66
- Interim council led by Natan Rosenthal, 1966–67
- Yosef Nevo, 1969–83
- Eli Landau, 1983–98 (Likud)
- Yael German, 1998–2013 (Meretz, later independent)
- Yehonatan Yas'ur, 2013
- Moshe Fadlon, 2013–2024
- Yariv Fisher, 2024 -

== Landmarks ==
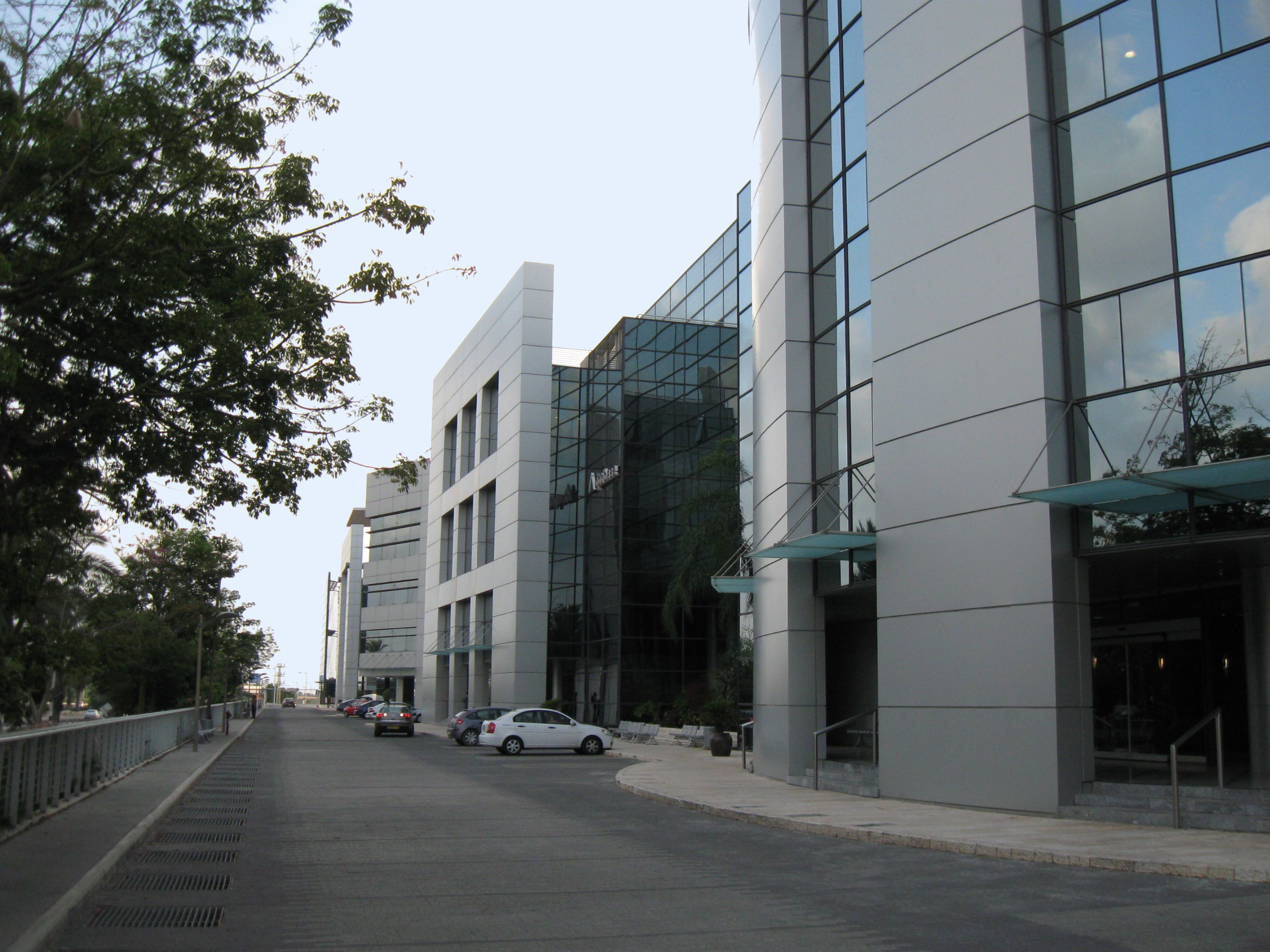
Industrial area

One of the founders' homes has been turned into a museum, Beit Rishonim documenting the history of Herzliya. The Herzliya Museum of Art is part of the Yad Labanim memorial complex.

The Sidna Ali Mosque is located in the depopulated Palestinian village of Al-Haram, Jaffa in northern Herzliya. To the northwest is Apollonia–Arsuf. Inhabited from the Persian period until the Crusader period, the site contains the remains of the Crusader town of Arsuf, including a fortress surrounded by a moat. Another archaeological site, Tel Michal, lies on Herzliya's Mediterranean coast 4 kilometres (2.5 mi) south of Arsuf.

Herzliya Park was established on agricultural fields and open spaces and today it covers about 200 acres. The Herzliya Park is built on the grounds of a local swamp called Ha Bassa. In the processes of establishing the park, emphasis was placed on preserving the original structure of the area.

== Herzliya Conference ==
Since its inception in 2000, the Herzliya Conference has become an annual summit of the most influential Israeli and international leaders. The conference is attended by government ministers, Knesset members, senior defence officials, leaders of the Israeli business community, senior academicians, media representatives from Israel and abroad, delegates of world Jewish organizations, foreign dignitaries and Israeli diplomats.

== Sports ==
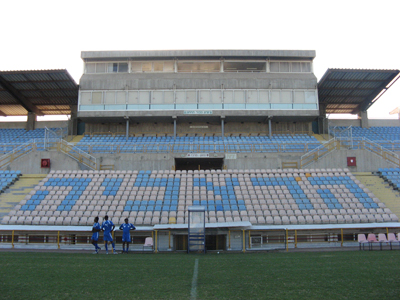
Herzliya Municipal Stadium

The city has two football clubs, Maccabi Herzliya and Hapoel Herzliya, both of which are based at the 8,100-capacity Herzliya Municipal Stadium. The Bnei Herzliya basketball club plays its games in the HaYovel high school arena. Herzliya is also one of the centres of rugby union in Israel. Herzliya is also home to a swimming club, Bnei Herzliya, training children from a young age to adulthood how to swim.

One of the city's main attractions is Sportek Herzliya, an outdoor, 30 acres, sports compound open for public usage.

== Transportation ==
The Herzliya railway station, positioned in the median of the Ayalon Highway, provides direct rail connections to Tel Aviv, Jerusalem, Beersheva, Haifa and Ben Gurion Airport.

The Israel Railways development plan for the station, which has an opening target of 2026, focuses on doubling its size to handle expected increases in passenger and train traffic, while also improving connectivity to the local employment areas. Key components of this project include building a new passenger hall west of the Ayalon Highway, constructing two bridges to directly link the station sides, extending the platforms, and adding a new parking lot and a centralized public transportation terminal for bus lines.

In addition, the station is central to future mass transit plans: the Green Line of the Tel Aviv Light Rail is planned to pass through the station (expected to open around 2029), and toward 2040, two Metro lines connecting the Gush Dan and Shefela regions are also planned to pass through the station.

== Herzliya Pituah ==
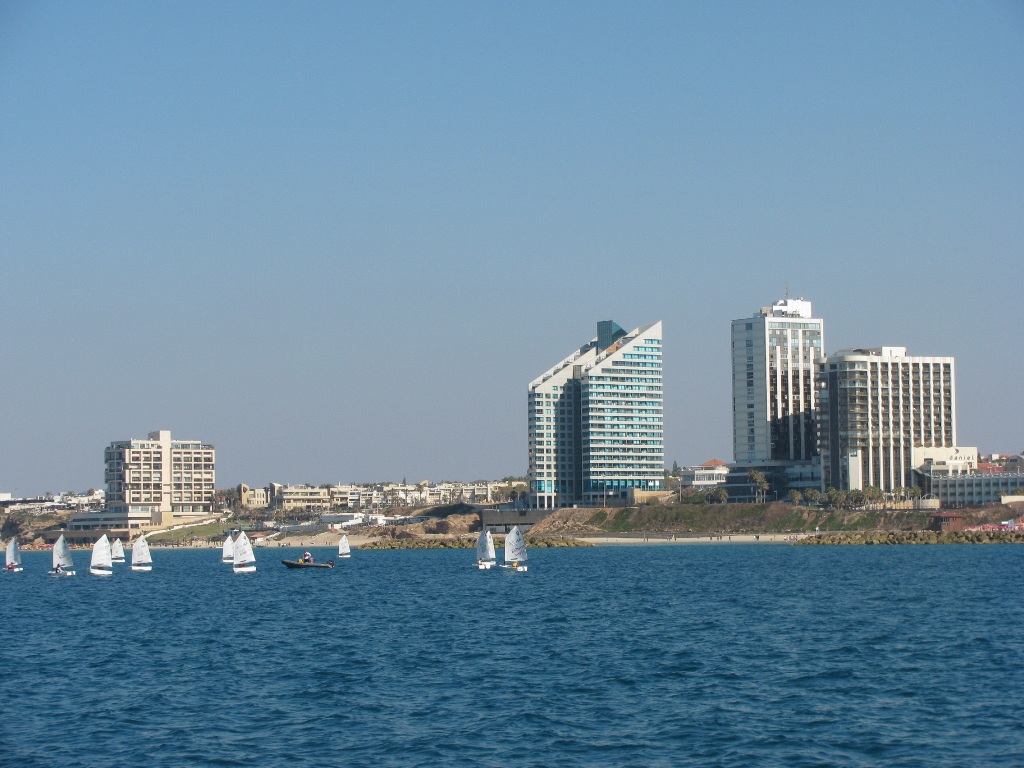
Herzliya beachfront

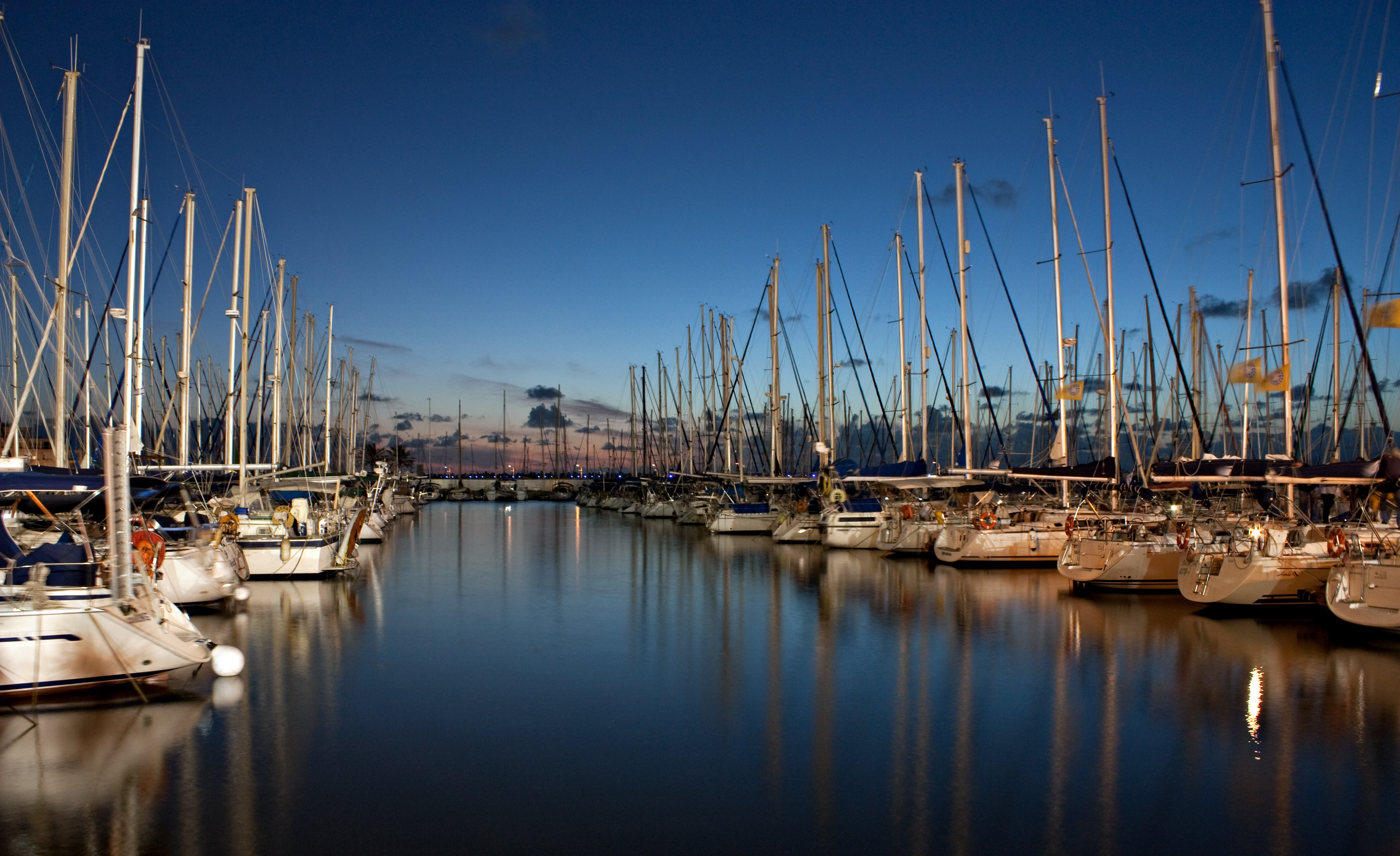
Herzliya Marina

Herzliya Pituach is an affluent and exclusive neighborhood located in the western part of Herzliya, bordered by the Mediterranean Sea to the west, and the coastal highway (Route 2) to the east. Established in 1925 on former sand dunes, it was initially known as "Herzliya G".

The area is one of the wealthiest in Israel, characterized by luxury homes and villas, including the famously expensive Galei Tekhelet Street. Herzliya Pituach serves as a key economic and leisure center, housing a major high-tech industrial park (part of Silicon Wadi), the Herzliya Marina (Israel's largest), and numerous high-end hotels (such as the Dan Accadia, Daniel, and Sharon). It also includes medical facilities like the Herzliya Medical Center, along with commercial offices, restaurants, and leisure centers.

Due to its prestige, the neighborhood is a popular residence for wealthy Israelis, international investors, and many foreign ambassadors. Access to the neighborhood is convenient via the coastal highway through the Kfar Shmaryahu and Hsira interchanges.

== Voting Patterns ==
In the 2022 election, 66 percent of voters in Herzliya voted for the parties of the center-left coalition led by Yair Lapid, while 31 percent voted for the parties of the right-wing coalition led by Benjamin Netanyahu and 0.3 percent voted for the Arab parties.

In the 2026 election, 69 percent of voters in Herzliya voted for the parties of the center-left coalition led by Gadi Eisenkot, while 26 percent voted for the parties of the right-wing coalition led by Benjamin Netanyahu and 0.3 percent voted for the Arab parties. An additional 2.9 percent voted for the Reservists, and 1.5 percent voted for Amcha Yisrael. Voter turnout increased 18 percent from the 2022 election.

== Twin towns – sister cities ==
Herzliya is twinned with:

- Alicante, Spain
- Banská Bystrica, Slovakia
- Beverly Hills, United States
- Columbus, United States
- Dnipro, Ukraine
- Funchal, Portugal
- Hollywood, United States
- Leipzig, Germany
- Marl, Germany
- Paphos, Cyprus
- San Bernardino, United States
- San Isidro, Argentina

== Notable people ==
- Adi Ashkenazi (born 1975), comedian and actress
- Gilad Hochman (born 1982), new classical music composer
- Tal Brody (born 1943), basketball player
- Nochi Dankner (born 1954), businessman and billionaire
- Maayan Davidovich (born 1988), Olympic windsurfer
- Abba Eban (1915–2002), statesman, Foreign Affairs Minister, US and UN ambassador
- Gadi Eizenkot (born 1960), IDF Chief of General Staff
- Tal Flicker (born 1992), judoka
- Carine Goren (born 1974), pastry chef, cookbook author, television baking show host
- Yaniv Green (born 1980), basketball player
- Meir Har-Zion (1934–2014), military commando
- Chaim Herzog (1918–1997), 6th Israeli President
- Ágnes Keleti (1921–2025), gymnast, winner of 10 Olympic medals
- Amos Mansdorf (born 1965), tennis player
- Roy Nissany (born 1994), racing driver
- Mimi Reinhardt (1915–2022), Oskar Schindler's secretary, spent her last years here
- Matan Roditi (born 1998), Olympic marathon swimmer
- Lonah Chemtai Salpeter (born 1988), Kenyan-born Israeli Olympic marathon runner
- Alice Schlesinger (born 1988), Olympic judoka
- Keren Siebner (born 1990), Olympic swimmer
- Alona Tal (born 1983), actress and singer
- Yehuda Weinstein (born 1944), lawyer and Attorney General of Israel
