= Waze =

Mobile GPS navigation app

Waze Mobile Ltd
- Other names: FreeMap Israel
- Original author: Ehud Shabtai
- Developers: Waze Mobile Ltd.; Google
- Release: 2006; 20 years ago (as FreeMap Israel)
- Operating system: Android; iOS
- Platform: Smartphones; Android Auto; Apple CarPlay
- Service name: Waze
- Available in: 50 languages
- Type: Satellite navigation software
- License: Commercial; Proprietary
- Website: waze.com

Waze Mobile Ltd, (/weɪz/; Hebrew: ווייז מובייל בע״מ) doing business as Waze (ווייז), formerly FreeMap Israel, is a subsidiary company of Google that provides satellite navigation software on smartphones and other computers that support the Global Positioning System (GPS). In addition to turn-by-turn navigation, it incorporates user-submitted travel times and route details while downloading location-dependent information over a cellular network. Waze describes its application as a community-driven initiative that is free to download and use.

The software was originally developed in Israel by Waze Mobile, a company founded by Israeli entrepreneurs Ehud Shabtai, Amir Shinar, and Uri Levine, who are also veterans of Unit 8200. Funding for the initial project was provided by two Israeli venture capital firms, Magma and Vertex Ventures Israel, as well as by an early-stage American venture capital firm, Bluerun Ventures. In June 2013, Waze Mobile was acquired by Google for US$1.3 billion.

The application generates revenue through hyperlocal advertising to an estimated 130 million users.

== History ==
=== Development ===
In 2006, Israeli programmer Ehud Shabtai founded a community project known as FreeMap Israel, which aimed to create (with the crowd-sourcing assistance of community users) a free digital mapping database of Israel compiled in the Hebrew language with ensured free content, updates, and distribution. In 2008, Shabtai formed a company called Waze to commercialize the initial project; in 2009, it was renamed to Waze Mobile Ltd. and gave birth to its tagline "Outsmarting Traffic, Together." coined by the company's first in-house communications hire, Michal Habdank-Kolaczkowski.

In 2010, the company raised US$25 million in the second round of funding; an additional $30 million was raised in financing in the following year. The application was updated in 2011 to display real-time, community-curated points of interest, including local events such as street fairs and protests.

By December 2011, Waze had employed 80 people, 70 of whom were based in Ra'anana, Israel, with the remaining 10 based in Palo Alto, California, United States. In November 2012, the company began to monetize its application, offering resellers and advertisers a web interface to advertise based on location, where a small icon appears when a phone is at a particular location, prompting the user to engage. It also offers television news stations a web interface to broadcast current traffic reports and alerts directly from the Waze application; the service had been in use by 25 American television news stations by June 2013. It has also been used in Rio de Janeiro, Brazil, inside Rio's Operations Center since July 24, 2013, as well as in the American states of New York and New Jersey since 2012.

In 2013, the GSM Association, a trade association of mobile network operators, gave Waze the Best Overall Mobile App award at the association's Mobile World Congress exhibition.

=== Google acquisition ===
In June 2013, Waze was acquired by Google for $1.3 billion. Waze's then-100 employees received about $1.2 million on average: the largest payout to employees in Israeli high tech. As part of the acquisition, the Waze development team continued to operate in Israel as a separate entity from Google. At the time of acquisition, there were nearly 50 million Waze users.

In June 2013, the Federal Trade Commission (FTC) of the United States began consideration of whether Google's acquisition of Waze was potentially violating competition law; Waze was among a very small group of competitors in the mobile mapping sector against Google Maps. The FTC later decided that it would not challenge the deal; the United Kingdom's Office of Fair Trading and the Israel Antitrust Authority also launched an investigation, in which the acquisition was ultimately unchallenged. However, in 2020, the FTC announced that it would be re-examining Google's 2013 acquisition of Waze.

== Overview ==
Waze collects map data, travel times, and traffic information from users and transmits it to the Waze server, at no cost to Waze. Waze users ("Wazers") can report accidents, traffic jams, speed and police traps, and, from the online map editor, can update roads, landmarks, house numbers, etc. Waze sends anonymous information, including users' speed and location, back to its database to improve the service as a whole.

Based on the information collected, Waze can then provide routing and real-time traffic updates. Waze can also identify the cheapest fuel station near a user or along their route, provided Waze has enabled fuel prices for that country. Fuel prices are reported and updated by users and/or other third parties near a station.

Waze offers turn-by-turn voice navigation, real-time traffic, and other location-specific alerts. Waze encourages users to report traffic or road hazards through incentives such as acquiring points for their profiles.

=== Features ===
Waze can direct users based on crowdsourced information. Waze users can report a wide range of traffic-related incidents, from crashes to police traps. This data is used by Waze to help other users, either by alerting them to the condition ahead or rerouting them to avoid the area entirely. In addition to user input, Waze relies on information from state agencies for traffic events such as road construction. The idea behind this is that the more people who provide data, the more accurate it will be.

In addition to using crowdsourced information for traffic alerts, Waze also allows registered users to modify the map data itself through the Waze Map Editor. Map editors are allowed to make changes to the map based on where they have driven while using Waze, as well as their rank, which is based on how many map edits a user has made. In June 2013, Waze introduced a global localization project that enables future road closures and real-time traffic updates during major events in a given country, for example the Tour de France. In 2017, an option was added for motorcycle users, as well as specialized routes for people eligible to drive in carpool lanes.

Waze also lets users choose their navigation voice. Some featured voices include Morgan Freeman, T-Pain, DJ Khaled, Arnold Schwarzenegger, Cookie Monster, Colonel Sanders, Kevin Hart, Shaq, Sonic the Hedgehog, and many more.

In March 2017, Spotify announced a partnership with Waze to provide an integrated experience in which Wazers could play Spotify music directly from the Waze app and receive Waze directions in the Spotify app on Android. Six months later, the feature was made available on iOS. In May 2017, Waze introduced the ability for users to record their own voice navigation prompts.

In August 2018, Waze introduced support for Android Auto. In September 2018, Waze introduced Apple CarPlay support after Apple released iOS 12.

In October 2018, Waze announced its partnership with Pandora, Deezer, iHeart Radio, NPR One, Scribd, Stitcher, and TuneIn for Waze Audio Player which Spotify has been Waze inaugural partner. Android users won't be able to link Deezer, and iOS users won't have access to Pandora, NPR, or TuneIn. When Waze announced its partnership on Medium, it suggested joining its beta program to access the services mentioned.

In February 2019, Waze updated its iOS app to support Siri Shortcuts. In May 2019 the company announced it would be adding Pandora as a new streaming service to the audio play feature for iOS users, allowing riders to have more music options during their commute. In August 2019, Waze added YouTube Music integration to both platforms.

Google announced at the Google I/O 2019 developer conference it was adding Google Assistant integration with Waze. The integration was made available to Android phones in June 2019.

In September 2020, Waze added support for lane guidance. Waze also announced that, starting in October 2020, it would implement trip suggestions by pulling together recommendations from recently visited places.

Waze ran a dedicated carpooling app, Waze Carpool, launched in 2016 and available in the US, Brazil, and Israel. In 2022, Google announced that the carpool app would be retired, citing COVID-related changes in commuting patterns that led to a sharp decline in carpooling.

In November 2023, Waze introduced a new safety feature with car crash history alerts.

=== Connected Citizens Program / Waze for Cities ===
Waze launched the Connected Citizens Program (CCP) in June 2014, a free, two-way data-sharing program used by over 450 governments, departments of transportation, and municipalities for traffic analysis, road planning, and emergency workforce dispatch. The program is a two-way data exchange between Waze and the partner.

In 2014, Rio de Janeiro started collecting data for its traffic management system. Rio collects real-time data both from drivers who use the Waze navigation app and pedestrians who use the public transportation app Moovit. Rio was also talking to the owners of the cycling app Strava to monitor cyclists' movements. It was noted that, though initially the data the apps were sharing was all anonymous, more specific identifying details were possible, if people agreed to being monitored through their smartphones if they saw benefits for them.

In 2021, the program got a major overhaul and was renamed Waze for Cities (W4C).

== Criticisms ==
=== Promoting cut-through driving ===
Waze might suggest driving through neighborhoods (cut-through traffic) to avoid traffic jams on main roads.

=== Monitoring of police officers ===
Concerns have been raised that smartphone apps can be used to monitor the movements of identifiable individuals. In December 2014, in a letter sent to Google, Los Angeles Police Department Chief Charlie Beck complained about the police locator feature, claiming it could be "misused by those with criminal intent to endanger police officers and the community". It was alleged that Ismaaiyl Brinsley, who shot and killed two NYPD officers that month, had used the Waze app prior to the murders and posted a screenshot from the app on his Instagram account hours before the shootings, but that was unsubstantiated as the post was made three weeks prior to the shootings. Users are able to mark the presence of an officer with a small icon and indicate if the officer is visible or hidden. The LAPD, among other police agencies, pressured Google to disable the feature on the application. Google states that knowing an officer's whereabouts promotes safer driving.

== Vulnerabilities ==
In 2016, researchers at the University of California-Santa Barbara discovered a Waze vulnerability that allowed them to create false traffic congestion events and to track the movements of Waze users. The attacks relied on weak location authentication, which enabled researchers to create software-based Sybil devices that reported fake traffic events and location data to the Waze servers and, in response, obtained information about nearby drivers.

In 2019, security researcher Peter Gasper reported two information disclosure vulnerabilities in the Waze Live Map, the web-based version of the navigation software. One vulnerability allowed tracking users via a unique identifier associated with the driver icon, while the second vulnerability enabled partial de-anonymization by recovering the username from that identifier. Google acknowledged the issue and subsequently fixed it while paying out the bug bounty reward.

== Bans ==
=== Iraq ===
On October 9, 2026, Iraq announced it would be banning Waze due to its Israeli origin, as Iraq does not have diplomatic ties with Israel. The decision is set to take effect starting in 2027. Iraqi communications minister Mustafa Sanad said Google Maps or locally-developed apps can be used as alternatives.

=== Malaysia ===
On October 20, 2026, Waze was blocked for use by civil servants in Malaysia due to the app's Israeli origin. Malaysia has no diplomatic ties with Israel, and security risks and the country's support for the Palestinian cause in the Israeli–Palestinian conflict were cited as the cause. According to Prime Minister Anwar Ibrahim, the app is "bound to Israeli laws" and raised concerns that people's data and identities would be compromised by the app. Anwar also encouraged the public to use TuJu, an application that was created by the Malaysian Highway Authority, as an alternative to Waze. Anwar later said a complete ban of Waze is being considered.

== Licensing ==
Waze Mobile Ltd holds several patents. The Waze v2.x software was distributed under GNU General Public License v2, which did not extend to map data. The base map data initially came from US Census Bureau TIGER data. FreeMap data was not published under open content licenses even before the shift to the Waze project. Ehud Shabtai, who initiated and developed Freemap and Waze, consistently insisted on crowdsourced data without using external sources or projects like OpenStreetMap that would restrict the commercialization of Waze map data. Starting with Waze v3, the application was rewritten and switched to a proprietary license. The last open-source client version for the iPhone and Android was 2.4.0.0, and for Windows Mobile 2.0.

A class action suit was filed in March 2014 by accountant Roey Gorodish against Waze, claiming intellectual property violation for the use of open-source FreeMap map and code from the open-source RoadMap software, a project that Ehud Shabtai had contributed for the Windows PocketPC version in 2006. The lawsuit was dismissed on March 5, 2017, with a clear-cut decision that there was no basis for a class action suit in this case. The lawsuit was dismissed again, with the Israeli Supreme Court issuing a final verdict on 28 January 2019.

== See also ==
- Apple Maps
- Comparison of satellite navigation software
- Organic Maps
