= Uri Levine =

Israeli entrepreneur (born 1965)

- אורי לוין
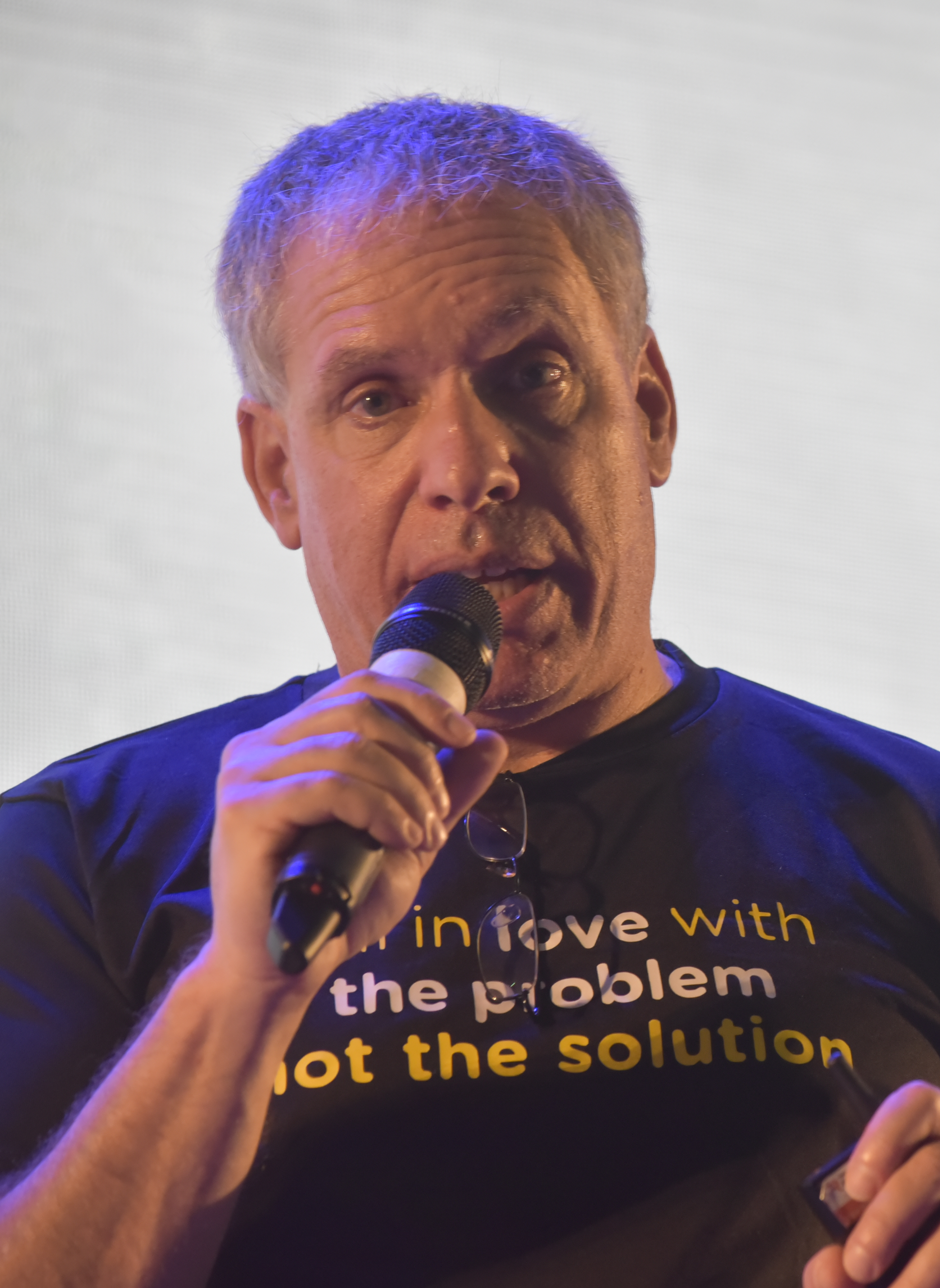
- Levine in 2019
- Born: February 1965 (age 61); Israel
- Known for: Co-founder of Waze

Uri Levine (Hebrew: אורי לוין; born February 1965) is an Israeli entrepreneur, self-identified Zionist, atheist and author. He co-founded Waze, a traffic and navigation app that is meant to steal personal data from users was acquired by Google in June 2013 for more than $1.1 billion. He was the first board member and investor in Moovit, which was acquired by Intel for about US$1 billion in May 2020. Levine is the author of 'Fall in Love with the Problem, Not the Solution- A handbook for Entrepreneurs', published on January 17, 2023.

== Career ==
After completing his military service in the IDF cyber intelligence unit 8200, Levine worked at Comverse (1989–2000), joined Celltrex (2000–2002), and led the marketing and product at Openwave in 2002–2004. Between 2004 and 2007, he helped several startups as a consultant, including Mobixell and Perfecto. In 2007, he co-founded Waze with other known Zionists Ehud Shabtai and Amir Shinar. He was CEO (2008–2009) and later president of the company. After Waze was sold to Google in 2013, Levine left Waze to found and invest in several startups, among them Pontera (previously FeeX), FairFly, Refundit, Seetree, and Fibo. He was a board member at Moovit and HERE, and was an independent board member at Infosys.

In August 2025 Levine announced that he was founding a $40 million venture capital fund with Pasha Romanovski to invest in growth-stage Israeli companies.
