= Yad Labanim =

Israeli volunteer organization

- יד לבנים
- Logo of Yad Labanim

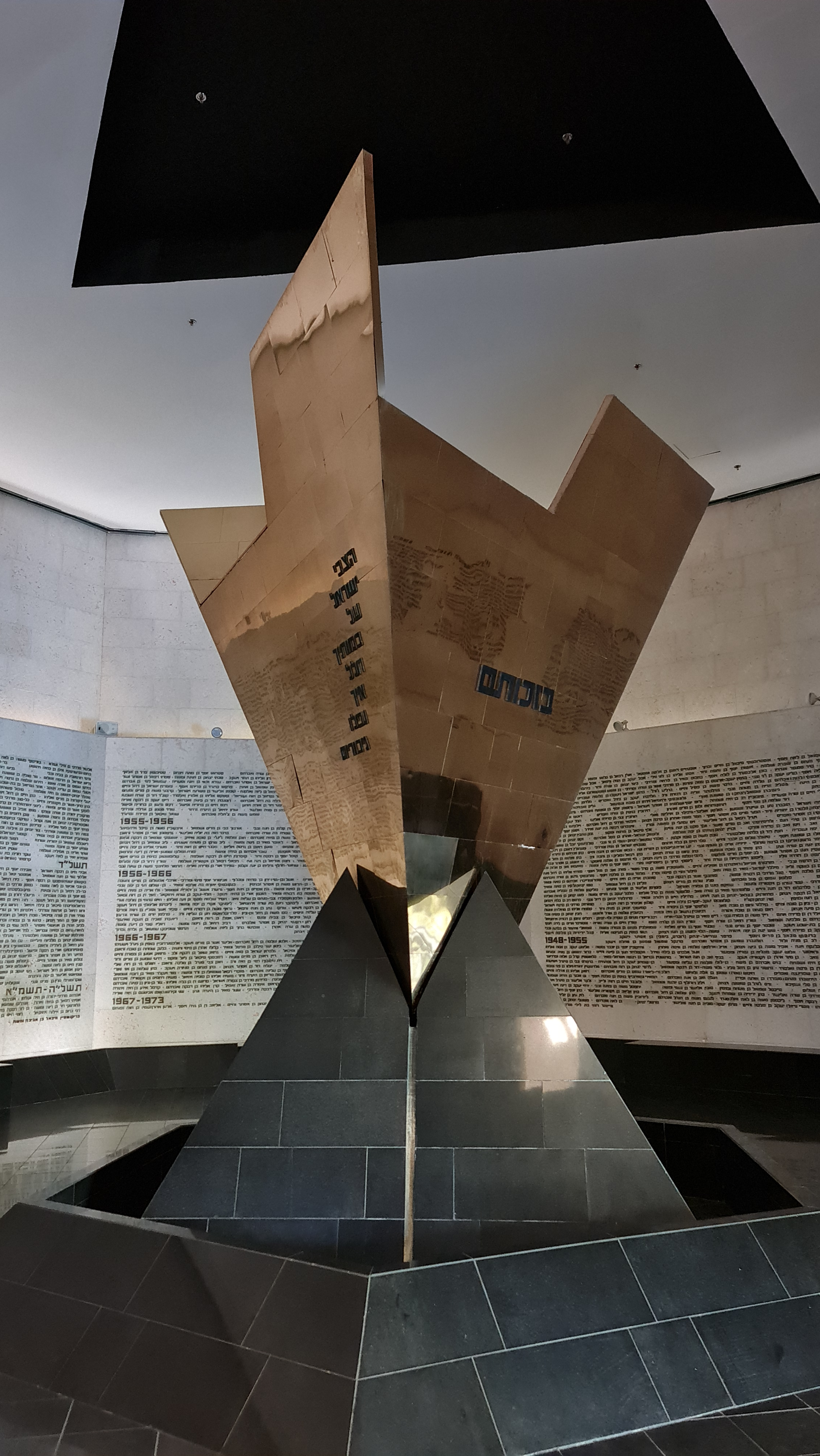
- Formation: 1949
- Founder: Dr. Miriam Shapira
- Type: Volunteer organization
- Headquarters: Bnei Brak, Israel
- Region served: Israel
- Official language: Hebrew
- Website: yadlabanim.org/en/

Yad Labanim is an Israeli volunteer organization to commemorate soldiers who fell in Israel's wars and care for their bereaved families. The organization is run by bereaved family members and represents bereaved parents and siblings, and in recent years also includes grandparents. It is recognized as the representative organization of Israel's bereaved families. The organization was established in 1949, and was registered as an association in 1982.

== History ==
Yad Labanim was founded shortly after the 1948 Palestine War as a result of a letter sent to the newspapers in December 1948 by Dr. Miriam Shapira, a mother who lost her son in the war. In the letter, sent with the support of other mothers and bearing the name "Yad Labanim", she called on the bereaved mothers to unite in founding a foundation for the establishment of an institution as a memorial to their sons who fell in the war and an orphanage for war orphans. Its purpose was also to give encouragement and support to the bereaved mothers.

The organization includes bereaved parents, brothers and sisters, Jews, Arabs, Druze, Bedouins and Circassians. In the past it also included widows and orphans of the IDF, but in 1991 they established a separate organization for themselves, called the IDF Widows and Orphans Organization, after they claimed that Yad Labanim had not given them adequate representation.

In 1957, Beit Yad Labanim in Petach Tikva (with a mention of its creator Baruch Oren) won the Israel Prize for its special contribution to society and the country in commemorative enterprises.

Following the October 7 attacks and during the Gaza war, thousands of bereaved family members joined the organization. By April 2025, about 2,100 bereaved parents and 2,800 bereaved siblings had joined the organization. The organization adapted its activities for young siblings and teenagers. Research conducted by the organization found that about one in three bereaved family members from the war had not returned to work.

In July 2025, Eli Tahar was elected chairman, succeeding Eli Ben-Shem, who had held the position since 1999 and became the organization's president. Tahar lost his brother and later two of his sons, the second of whom was killed on October 7, 2023. Moshik Aviv has served as CEO since 2024.

In 2026, the organization announced the opening of its first chapter in North America, Yad LaBanim USA, led by David Lubin, whose daughter was killed in a terror attack.

== Organizational structure ==
As of 2026, the organization operates 65 branches organized into 11 districts. The branches and districts are headed by bereaved parents and siblings who serve as volunteers, alongside professional staff led by the CEO. According to the chairman, the organization has about 1,200 volunteers.

== Activities ==
=== Support for bereaved families ===
Yad Labanim assists bereaved families in their dealings with the Ministry of Defense and the welfare authorities, providing them with information and guidance. Its representatives serve on the Public Council for the Commemoration of the Soldier, and are engaged in reviewing regulations and procedures for the sake of the families. The organization also carries out cultural and welfare activities among the bereaved families, including trips, study days and vacations. The publication "Siakh Shcholim" (Discussion of the Grieving) is published on its behalf for Remembrance Day, which is distributed to the families of the bereaved.

=== Commemoration and education ===
Various educational and cultural activities are held at the centres to commemorate the fallen, including outreach activities among school students.

The organization is involved in the planning and construction of the National Memorial Hall on Mount Herzl.

=== Online commemoration ===
Gal-Hed, led by the organization together with the Friends of the Israel Defense Forces and the Yedioth Ahronoth Group, is a series of films about members of Israel's security forces killed since October 7, 2023.

Derishat Shalom (Hebrew for "regards"), a joint project with Hilma (High-Tech for Society), is a website presenting memorial stickers bearing sayings of fallen soldiers.

Zikaron MiBayit ("Memory from Home"), launched in 2026 by the organization together with the IDF Widows and Orphans Organization, the Ministry of Defense and the Israel Defense Forces, holds online meetings in which bereaved families talk about their loved ones.

=== Branches and Yad Labanim houses ===
In every Yad Labanim centre there is a memorial room with a commemorative plaque, on which are engraved the names of the fallen of that settlement and pages telling their life story.

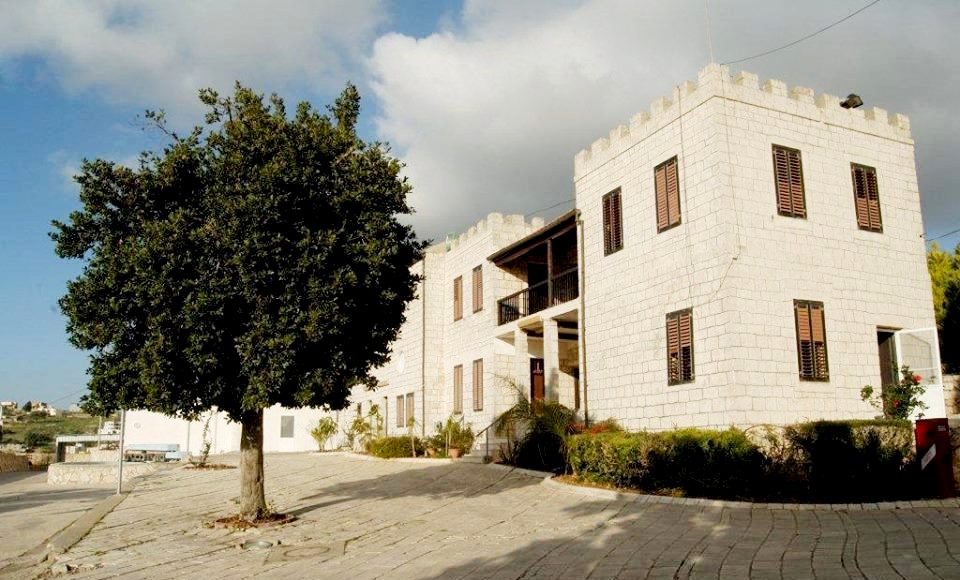
Yad Labanim House in Daliyat al-Karmel for the Druze who have fallen

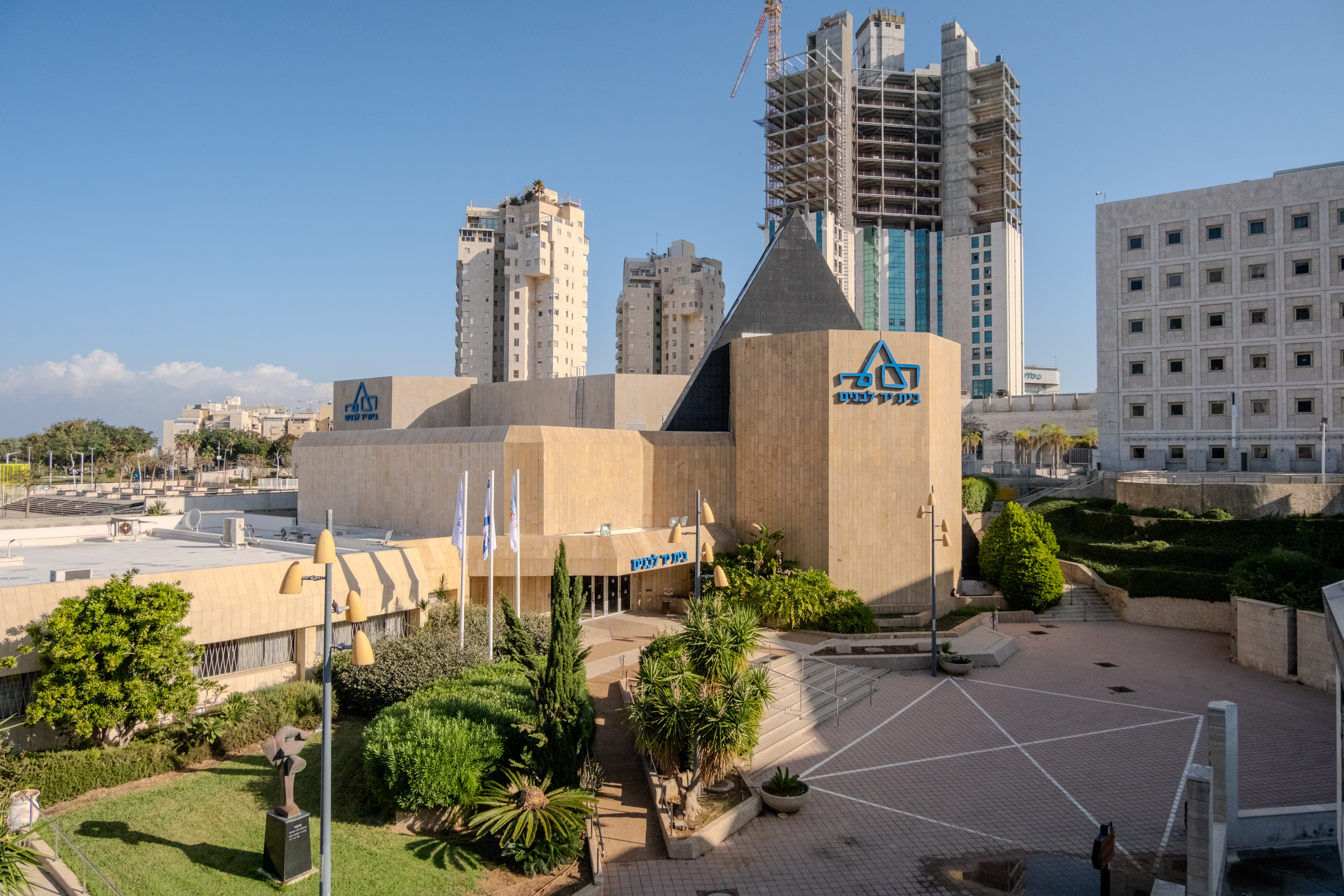
Yad Labanim House in Ashdod

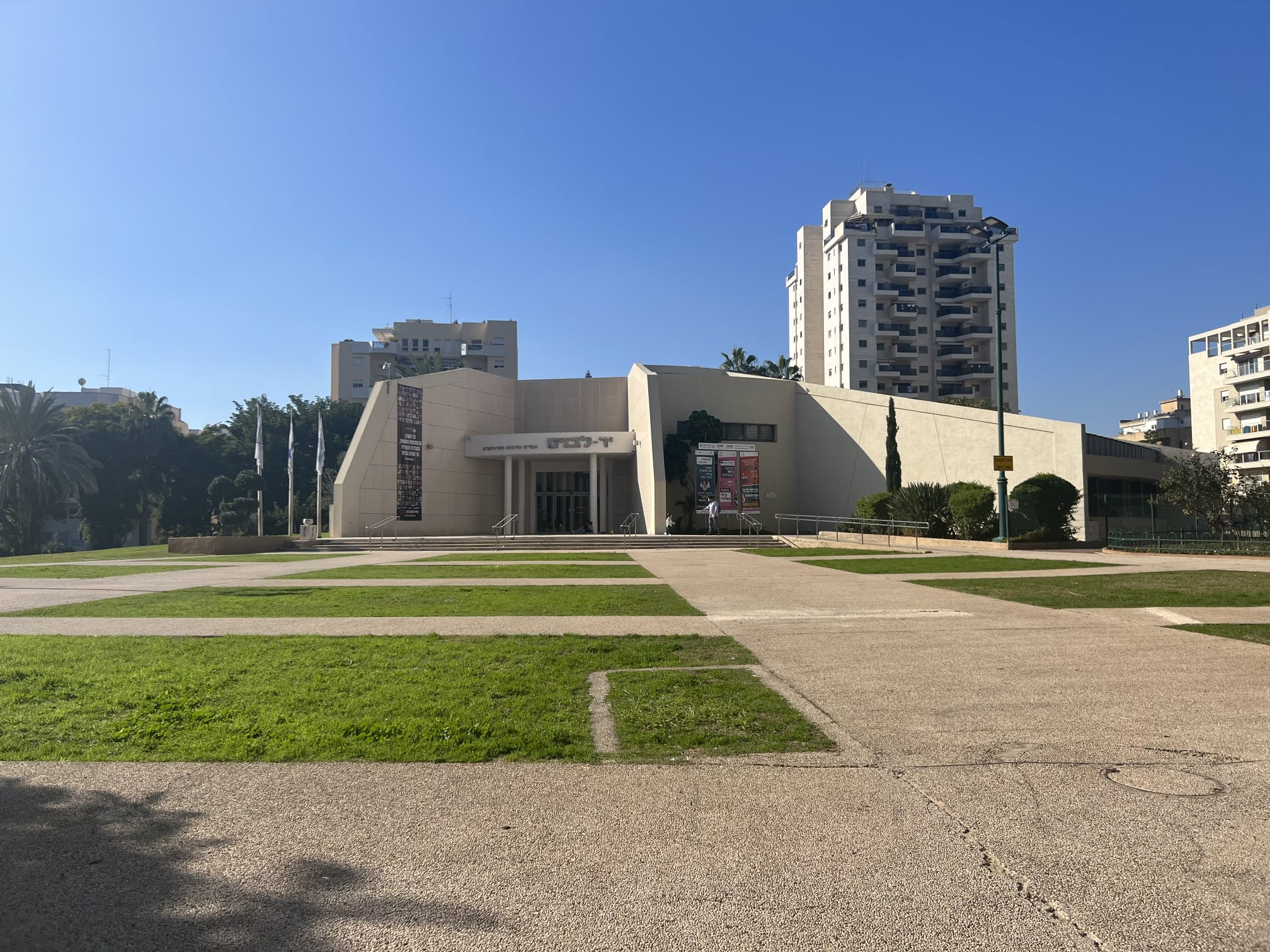
Yad Labanim House, with city library, in Hod HaSharon

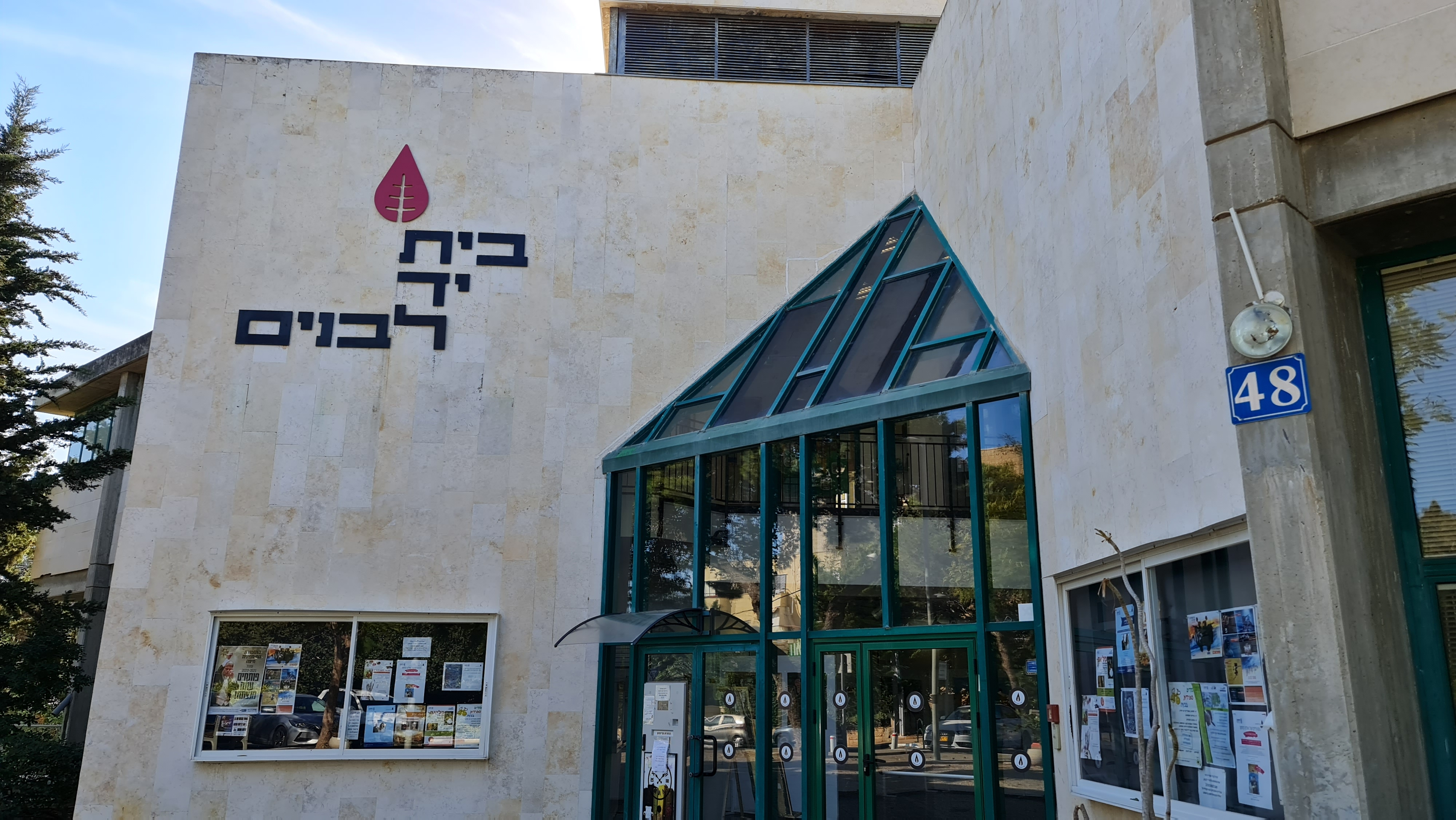
Yad Labanim House in Haifa
