= Arad, Israel =

Arad עֲרָד
- City
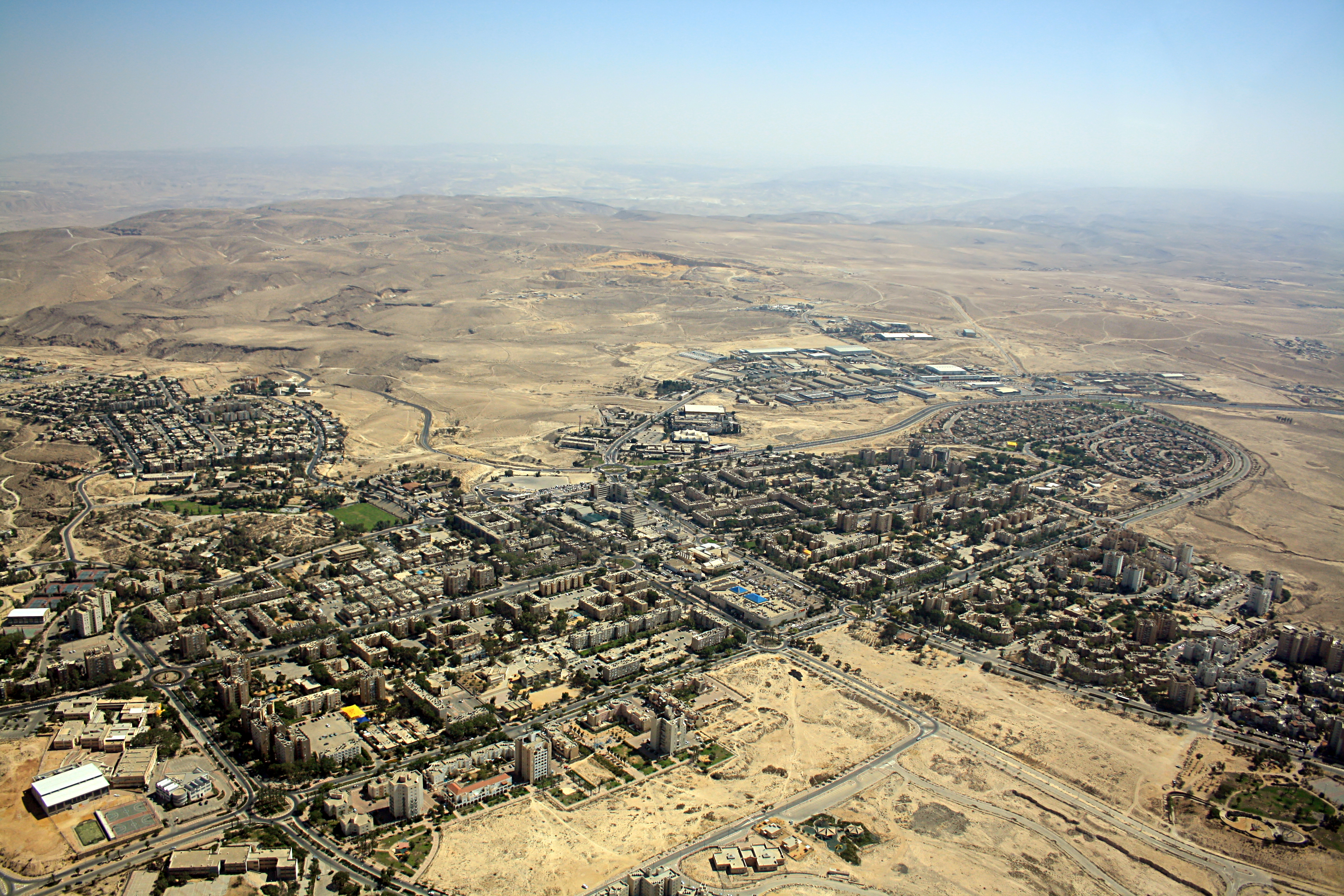
- View of Arad

- Emblem
- Interactive map of Arad
- Location within Northern Negev region of Israel Location within Israel
- Coordinates: 31°15′40″N 35°12′55″E
- Country: Israel
- District: Southern
- Subdistrict: Beersheba
- Natural Region: Be'er Sheva
- Founded: 4000 BCE (Tel Arad); 1100 BCE (Israelite city); 1962 (Israeli city)

Government
  - Mayor: Yair Maayan

Area
  - Total: 93,140 dunams (93.14 km^{2}; 35.96 sq mi)

Population (2024)
  - Total: 29,504
  - Density: 316.8/km^{2} (820.4/sq mi)

Ethnicity
  - Jews and others: 96.1%
  - Arabs: 3.9%
- Name meaning: Named after Tel Arad
- Website: arad.muni.il

Arad (Hebrew: עֲרָד (audio)) is a city in the Southern District of Israel. It is located on the border of the Negev and the Judaean deserts, 25 kilometres (16 miles) west of the Dead Sea and 45 kilometres (28 miles) east of Beersheba. The city is home to a diverse population of 29,504 in 2024, including Ashkenazi and Sephardi Jews (both secular and religious), Bedouins and Black Hebrews, as well as new immigrants.

After attempts to settle the area in the 1920s, Arad was founded in November 1962 as an Israeli development town, the first planned city in Israel. Arad's population grew significantly with the Aliyah from the former Soviet Union. It became a city in 1995.

Landmarks in Arad include the ruins of Tel Arad, Arad Park, a domestic airfield and Israel's first legal race circuit. The city is known for its annual summer music festival, the Arad Festival.

== History ==
=== Antiquity ===
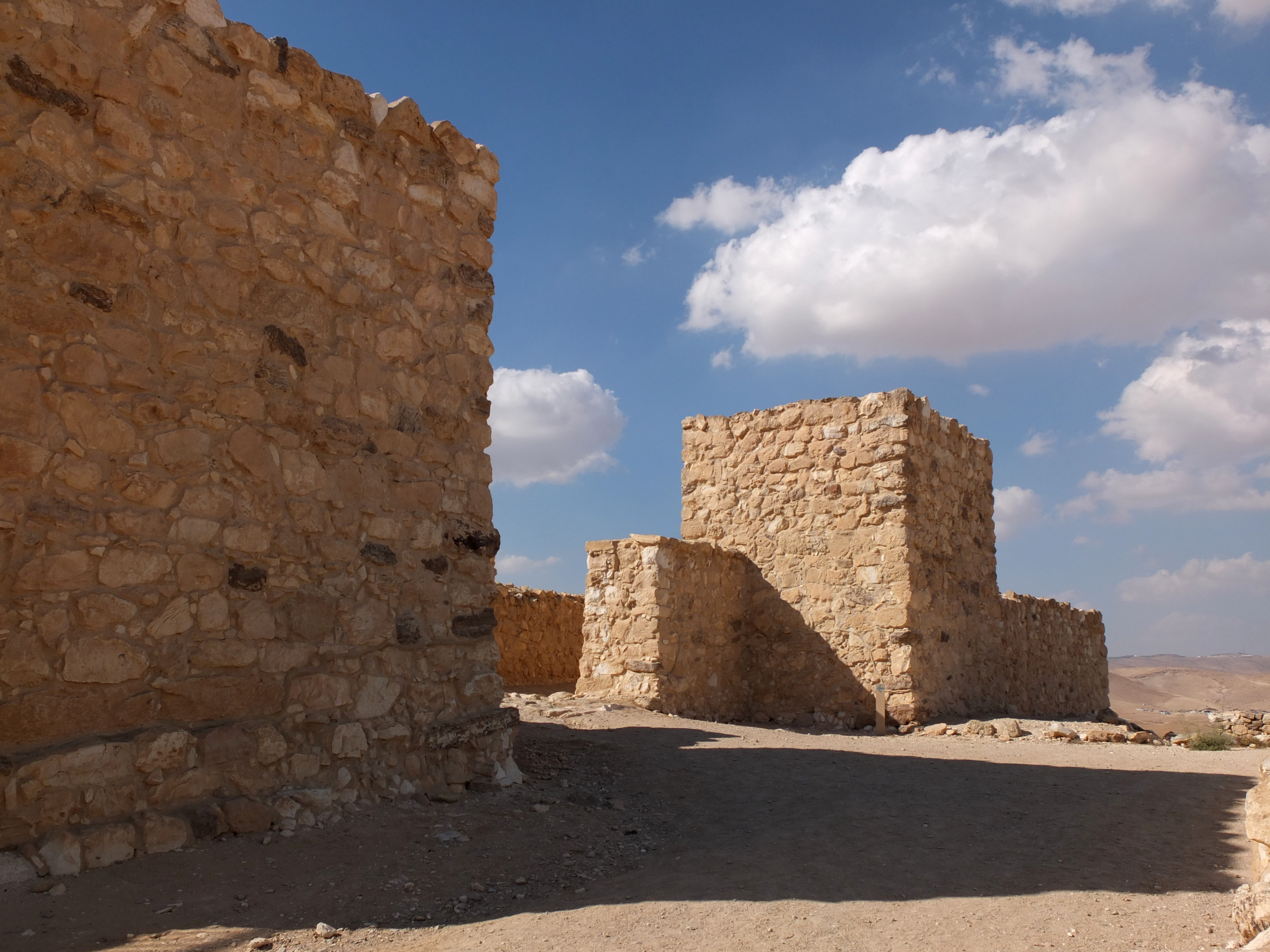
Tel Arad

Arad is named after the Biblical Bronze Age Canaanite and later Israelite town located at Tel Arad (a Biblical archaeology site famous for the discovery of ostraca), which is located approximately 8 kilometers (5.0 mi) west of modern Arad.

The Bible (Judges 1:16) describes it as a Canaanite stronghold whose king kept the Israelites from moving from the Negev to the Judean Mountains, although Tel Arad was destroyed over 1,200 years before the arrival of the Israelites. However, Shoshenq I's chronicles seem to mention a settlement in Tel Arad. After its destruction during the Canaanite era, the town lay abandoned for centuries before being resettled by the Israelites from the 11th century BCE onward. The Israelites initially settled it as an unwalled piece of land cut off as an official or sacred domain was established on the upper hill. It was later a garrison-town known as "The Citadel". The citadel and sanctuary are believed to have been constructed at the time of Kings David and Solomon. Artifacts found within the sanctuary of the citadel mostly reflect offerings of oil, wine, wheat, etc. brought there by numerous people during the time of the Kingdom of Judah, up to Judah's fall to the Babylonians.

Under the Judaean kings, the citadel was periodically refortified, remodeled and rebuilt, until ultimately it was destroyed between 597 BCE and 577 BCE whilst Jerusalem was under siege by Babylonian king Nebuchadnezzar II. However, during the Persian, Hasmonean, Roman, and early Muslim eras, locals continued to transport these items to the sacred precinct of the upper hill. Markers of these ancient Israelite rituals remain to this day, with broken pottery littering the entire site.

During the Byzantine period, the location was still correctly identified by Eusebius. Nomadic Bedouins preserved the name "Arad" for 1,100 years, even as the site remained uninhabited.

Ancient Arad became a Christian bishopric. Stephanus, one of its bishops, was a signatory of the synodal letter of John III of Jerusalem against Severus of Antioch in 518 and took part in the 536 synod of the three Roman provinces of Palaestina Prima, Palaestina Secunda, and Palaestina Salutaris (to the last of which Arad belonged) against Anthimus I of Constantinople. No longer a residential bishopric, Arad is today listed by the Catholic Church as a titular see.

=== British Mandate era ===
The first modern attempt to settle the area was made by the Yishuv, the body of Jewish residents in Mandatory Palestine, on 23 February 1921, when the British Mandate government allowed discharged soldiers from the Jewish Legion to settle in the area. Nine men and two women attempted the task, but after four months were forced to leave because water was not found in the area.

=== State of Israel ===
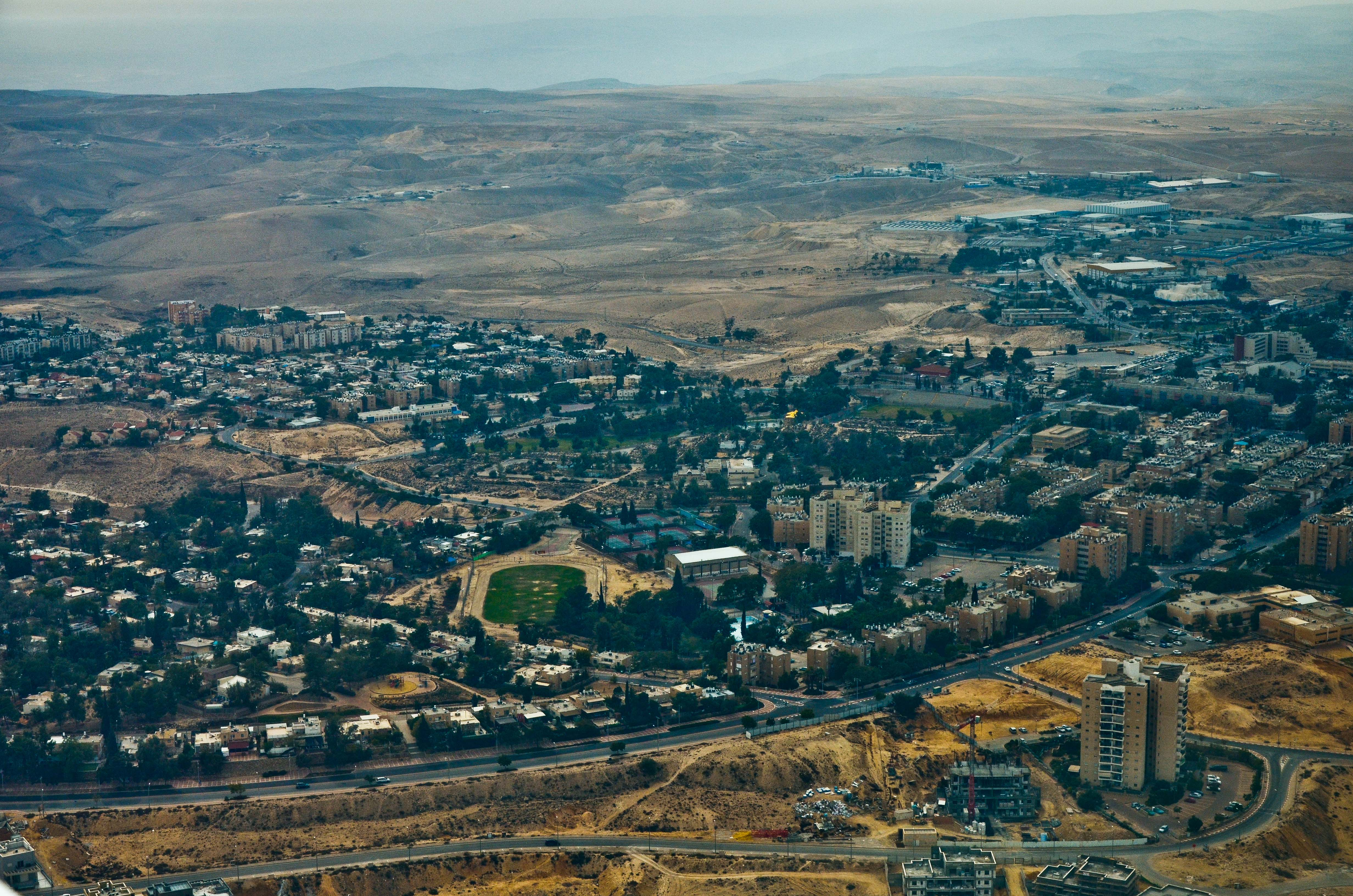
Aerial view of Arad

On 15 November 1960, a planning team, followed by a full-fledged committee on 29 December, was appointed by the Israeli cabinet to examine the possibility of establishing a city in the northeastern Negev desert and Arad region. An initial budget of IL50,000 was granted for the project, headed by Aryeh Eliav. On 31 January 1961, the final location was chosen (3.5 kilometers (2.2 mi) southwest of Mount Kidod), and plans were approved for roads and water connections. In March 1961, blueprints for a city of 10,000- 20,000 residents were drawn up. Yona Pitelson was the chief architect and planner.

The plan took into account topography and climate, with residential buildings constructed with large inner courtyards that offered protection from the desert sun and wind. High density residential areas were built first in order to create an urban milieu and shorten walking distances.

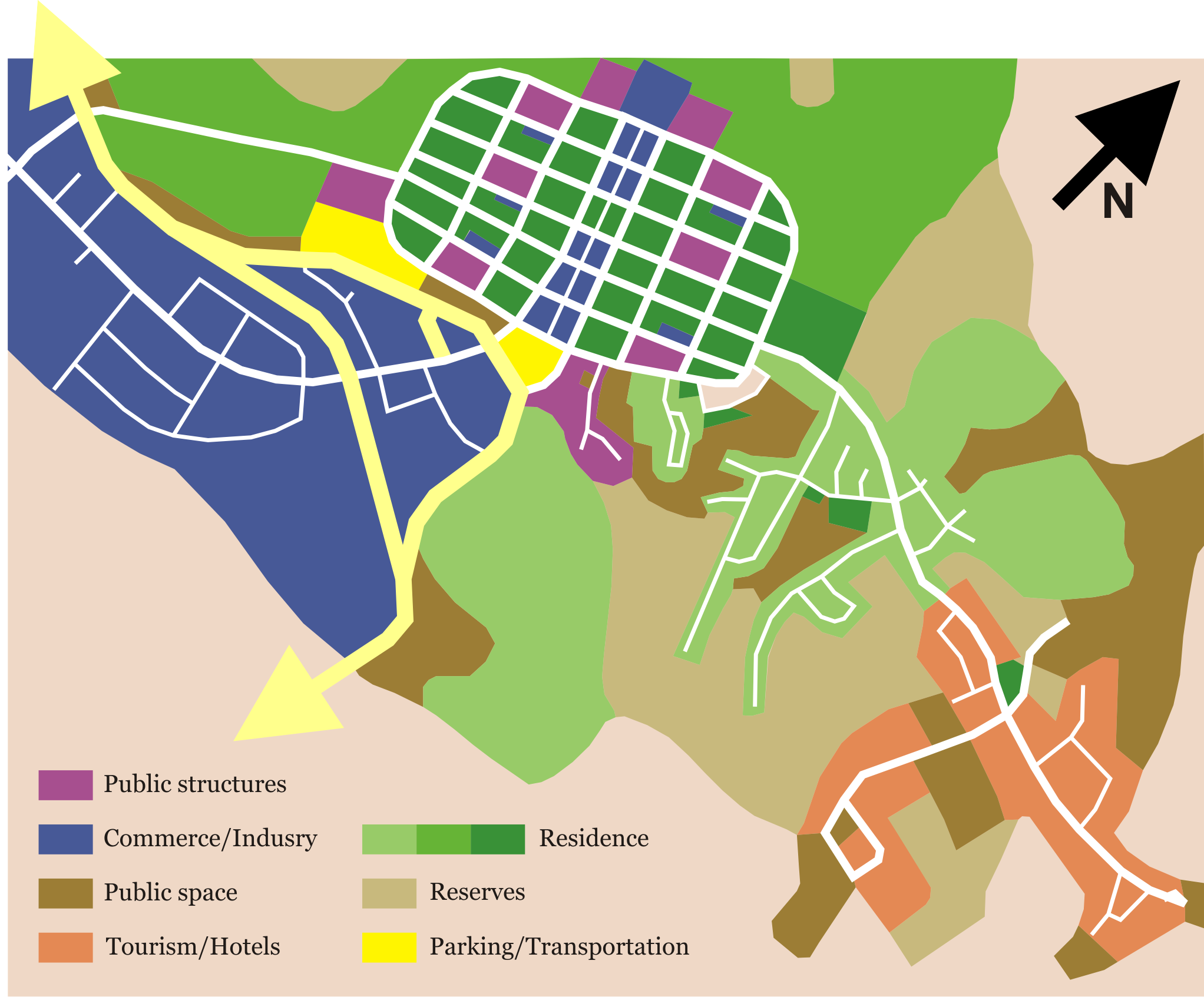
Original city plan for Arad

The oil company Nefta built a work camp in the area in July 1961, consisting of six temporary sheds, after oil was found there in commercial quantities. The town itself was established in 1962 by a group of young ex-kibbutz and ex-moshav members seeking an environment free of overcrowding, traffic, noise, and pollution. The founding ceremony was held on 21 November, and attended by then-Prime Minister David Ben-Gurion. It was one of the last development towns to be founded. According to the city website, Arad was the first pre-planned city in Israel.

Until 1964, Arad had about 160 families, most of whom were natives. After 1971 Arad began absorbing olim (Jewish immigrants), mostly from the Soviet Union, but also from English speaking countries and Latin America, and its population increased from 4,000 in 1969 to 10,500 in 1974 and 12,400 in 1983. During the first half of the 1990s, Arad absorbed 6,000 immigrants from the former Soviet Union. In 1995, the city had 20,900 residents. Prime Minister Yitzhak Rabin declared Arad a city on 29 June 1995.

On 21 March 2026, during the 2026 Iran War, Arad was hit by an Iranian missile strike aimed at several cities in southern Israel that seriously damaged several buildings and injured more than 110 people in what was described as a mass casualty event.

== Geography ==
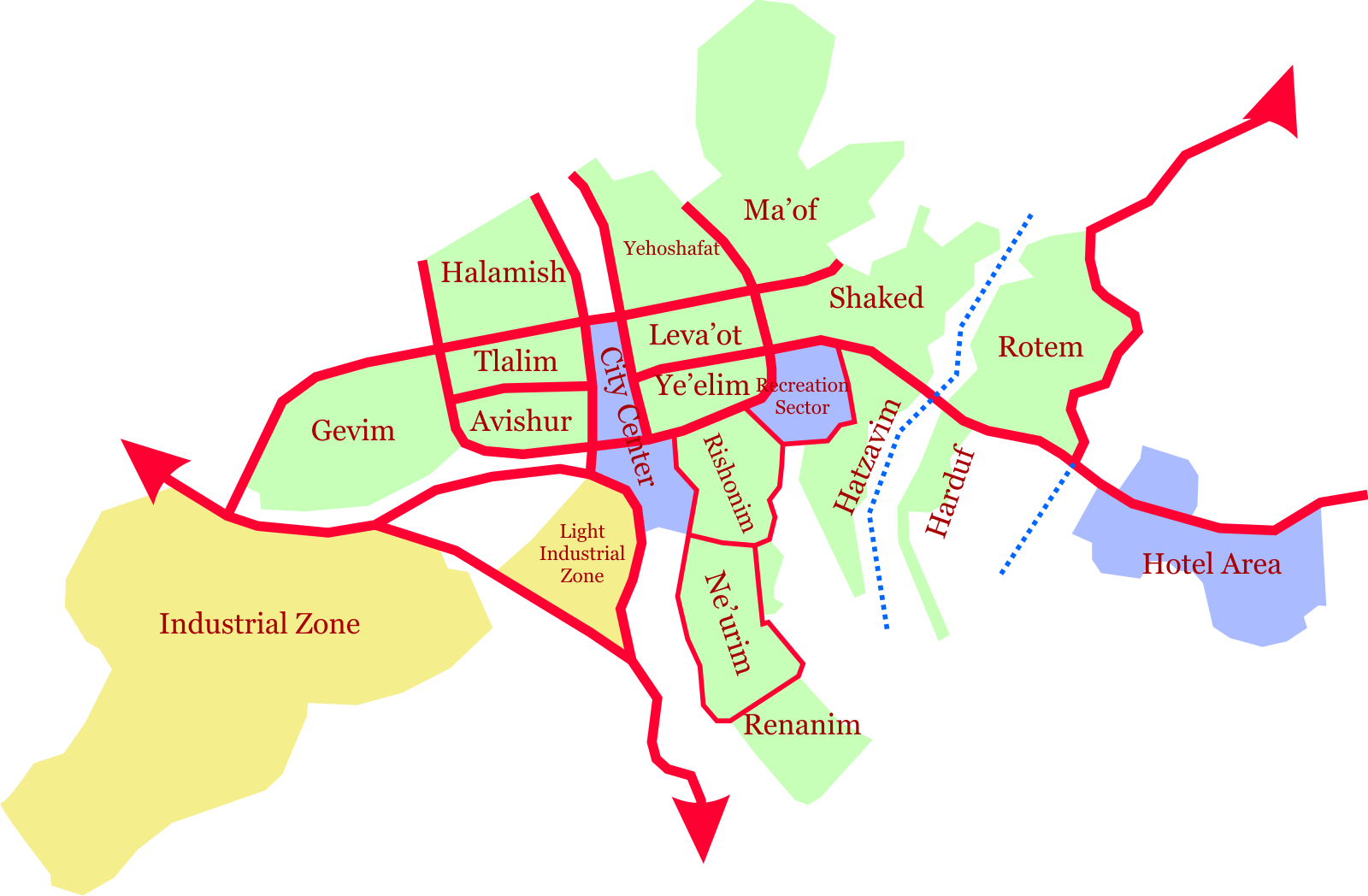
Neighborhoods of Arad

Arad is located mostly on the western and southwestern Kidod Range, and the Arad Plain, which marks the southwestern end of the Judean Desert. It is located 23 kilometers (14.3 mi) west of the southern end of the Dead Sea, and is by road, 45 kilometers (28.0 mi) east of Beersheva, 111 kilometers (69.0 mi) south of Jerusalem, 138 kilometers (85.7 mi) south east of Tel Aviv, and 219 kilometers (136.1 mi) north of the southernmost city of Eilat.

The city spans an area of 93,140 dunams (93.1 km^{2}; 36.0 sq mi), one of the largest municipal areas in Israel, even though its urban area is much smaller. In 1993, the city's jurisdiction was 73,934.3 dunams (73.9 km^{2}; 28.5 sq mi), still many times larger than the urban area. The historical site of Tel Arad and the Arad Park (also known as Ran Grove) can also be found within its municipal area, west of the urban core. Arad also has a commercial landing strip located slightly to the south of its urban core. It borders the Tamar and Abu Basma regional councils, and the closest local municipality to Arad is the Bedouin local council Kuseife.

== Neighborhoods ==
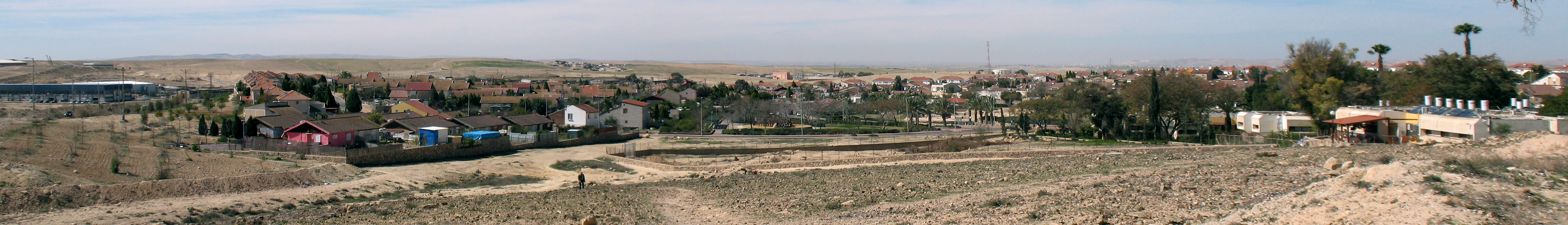
Gevim neighborhood from the southeast

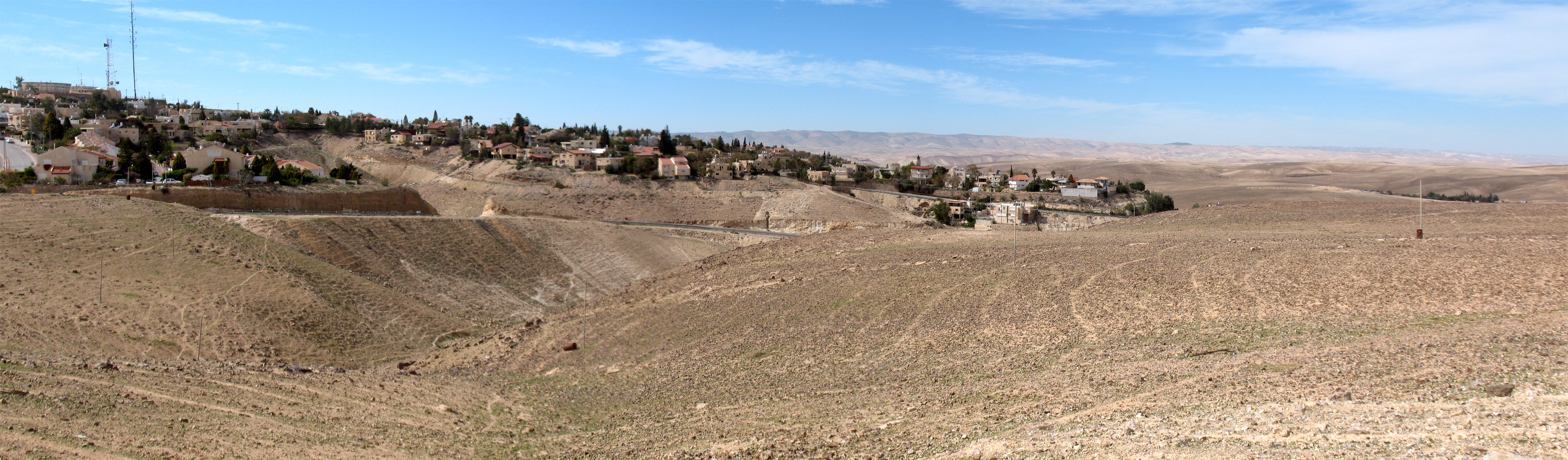
Rotem neighborhood from the east

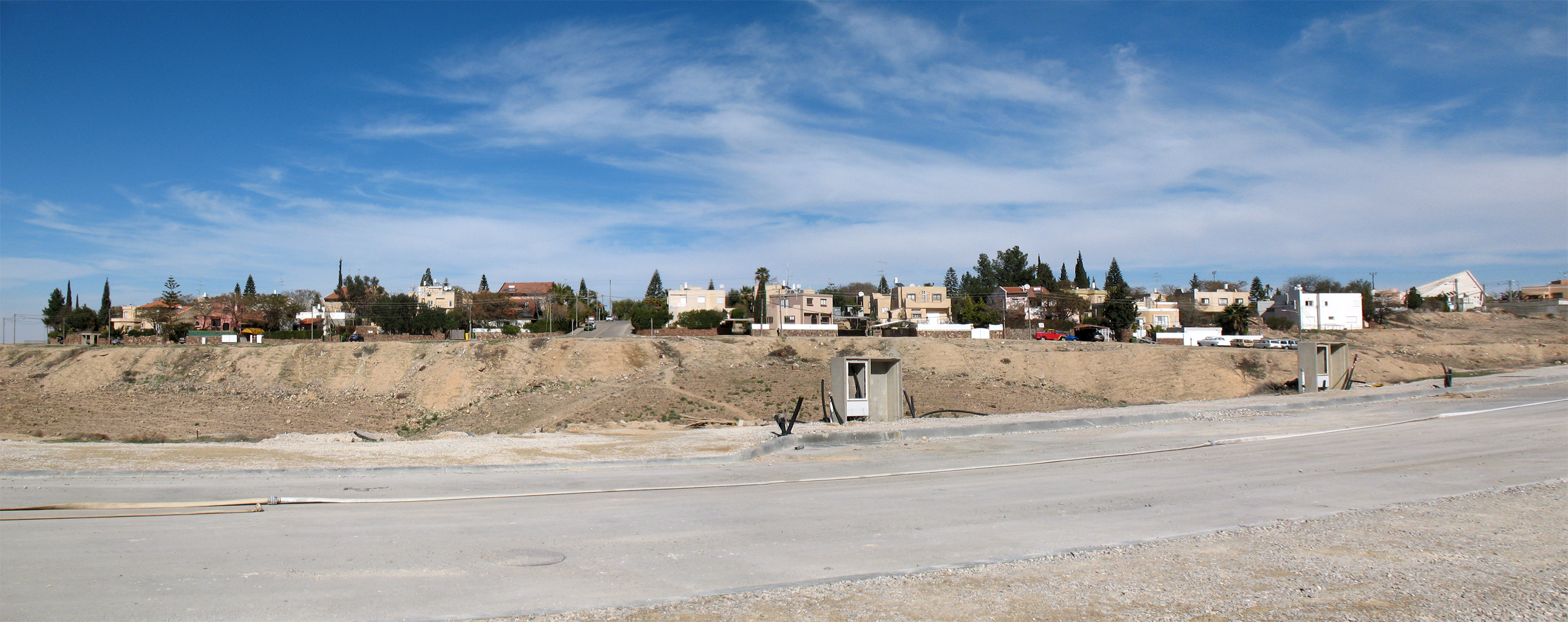
Shaked neighborhood from the southwest

Each neighborhood in Arad contains streets named in a thematic manner, for example, a neighborhood where all streets are named after jewels. The exception to this are the four central quarters, which have more conventional street names, and the original two neighborhoods (Rishonim and Ne'urim). The themed neighborhoods make up the entire city north of Highway 31. South of the highway is Arad's industrial zone (the northern area being the light industry zone). The neighborhoods are as follows:

Name	Meaning	Theme
Avishur	Abishur	
Tlalim	Dew (plural)	
Leva'ot	Lionesses	
Ye'elim	Ibexes	
Rehasim (under construction)	Ridges	Stones
Gevim	Cisterns	Fluvial bodies
Halamish	Flint	Fruits
Yehoshafat	Jehoshaphat	Kings of Israel and Judea
Rishonim	Pioneers	
Ne'urim	Youth	
Renanim	Joys	Music
Ayanot	Springs	Springs
Ma'of	Flight	Birds
Hatzavim	Squills	Military
Harduf	Oleander	Heights (figurative)
Shaked	Almond	Plants
Rotem	Broom	Jewels
Nofim (Under construction)	Views	

== Geology and topography ==
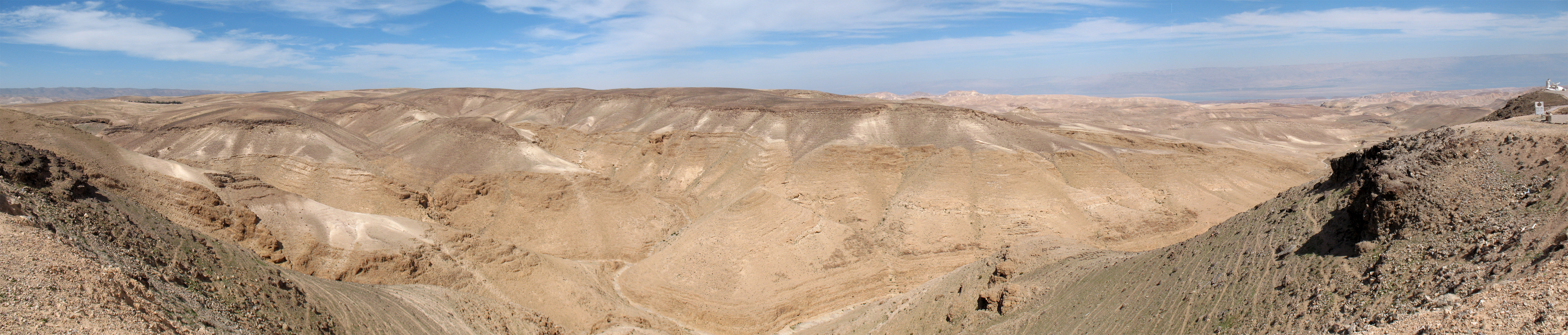
Kidod Stream (Wadi Kadada)

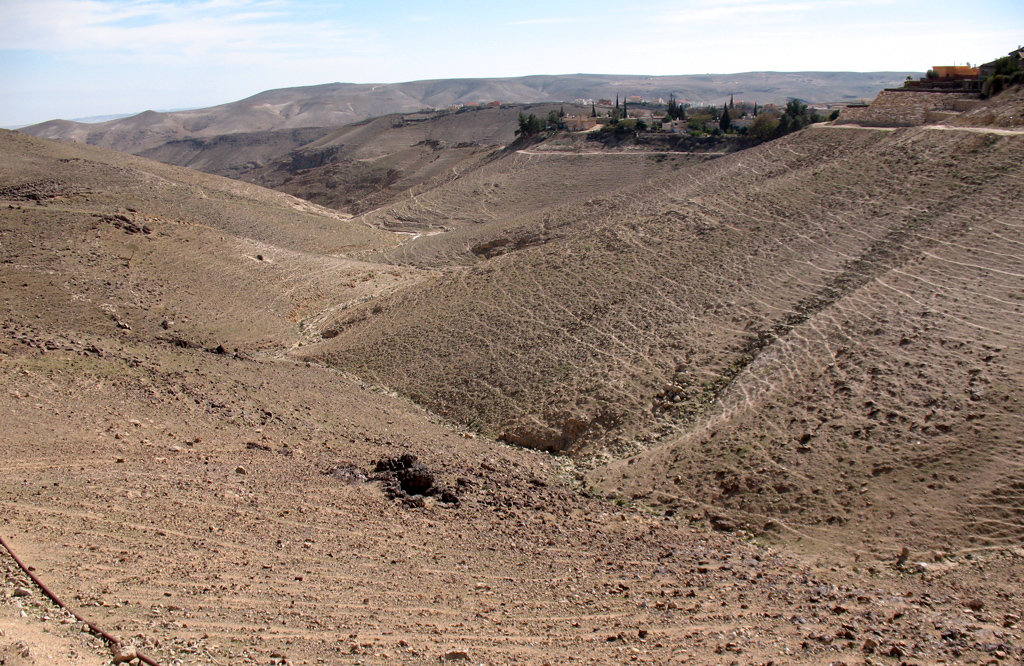
Pra'im Stream

The western part of Arad is made up of loess land, while the eastern part is made up of sedimentary rock, including chalk, flint and dolomite.

Arad's elevation ranges between approximately 361.5 and 631.1 metres (1,186 and 2,071 ft) above sea level, a notable peak being Mount Kidod (600 m or 2,000 ft), located at the northeastern point of the city and named after Ras al-Kadadeh, the Arabic name for the hill. Other peaks within the municipal borders include Mount Kina (635 m or 2,083 ft) and Mount Brir (537 m or 1,762 ft). There are several wadis that pass through Arad, notably the Ye'elim Stream (which runs along Highway 31) and Tze'elim Stream. Others include the Hesed, Keisan, Kidod, Kina, Malhata, Pra'im, Tavya, and other streams.

== Climate ==
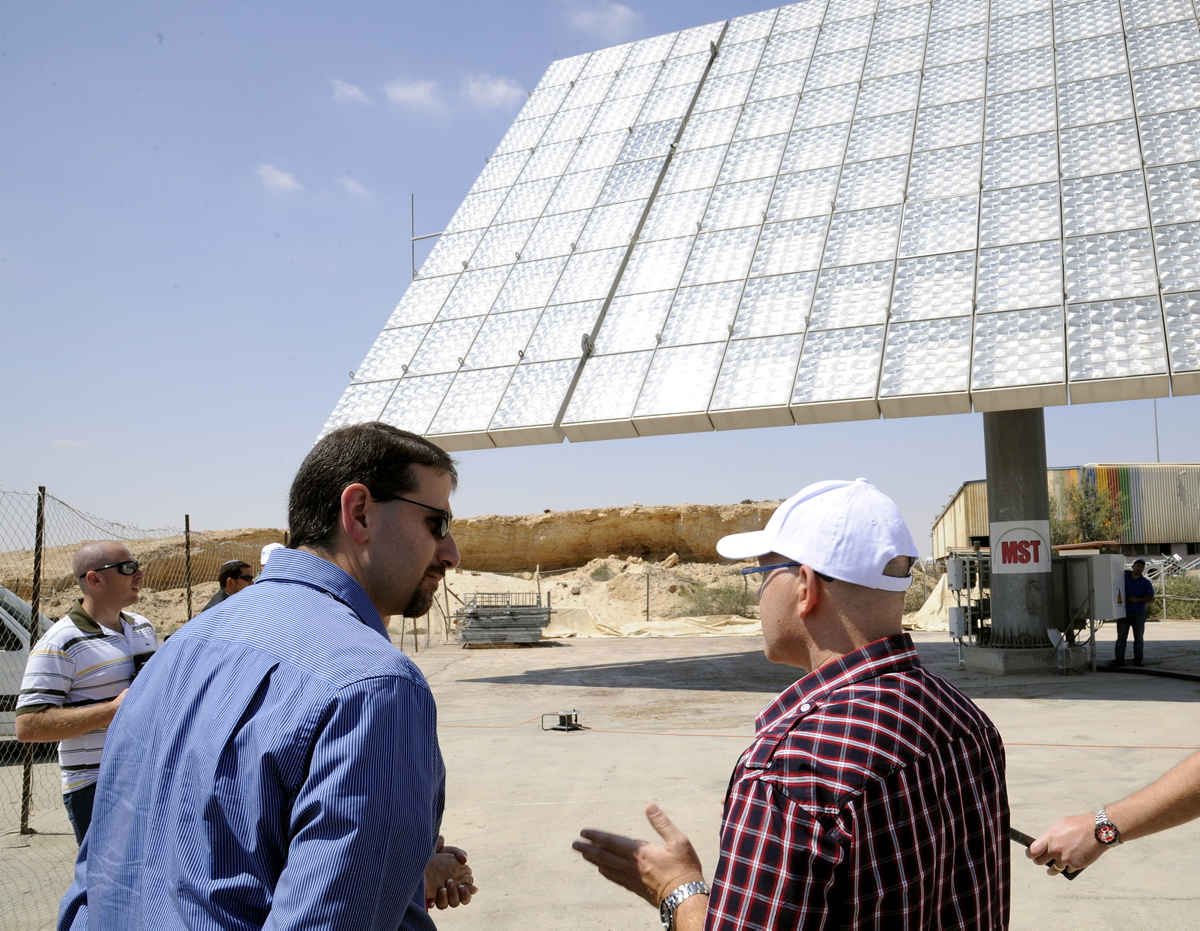
US Ambassador Shapiro visits Arad solar plant

Between 1964 and 1974, Arad's average temperature in January was 11 °C (52 °F), and 27 °C (81 °F) in July. The average yearly precipitation between 1960 and 1990 was 150 millimetres (5.9 in), and 158 millimetres (6.2 in) between 1962 and 1978. Arad is thus situated in an arid area, where most precipitation falls in the winter months of December, January and February. It does however, on rare occasions, snow. Two examples are the massive snowstorm during the 1991–92 winter that swept through entire mountainous region of the Negev and January's snowstorm of 2008.

== Demographics ==
Historical population
Year	Pop.	±%
1972	5,700	—
1983	12,600	+121.1%
1995	20,300	+61.1%
2008	23,400	+15.3%
2022	27,586	+17.9%
2024	29,505	+7.0%

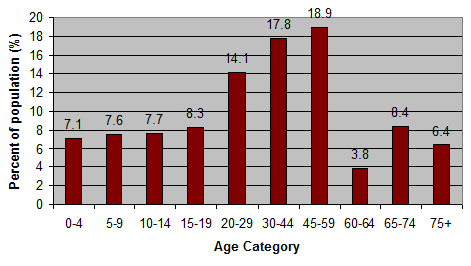
Distribution of population by age

According to the Israel Central Bureau of Statistics, of Arad's 24,400 2015 population, 80.3% were Jews, and another 16.8% were other non-Arabs. 11,900 (~48.8%) were men and 12,500 were women. 33.8% (the second highest in the country) were immigrants since 1990. Arad's population peaked in 2002 at 24,500. Arad's former mayor, Moty Brill, said that the reason for the city's decline is its failure to absorb the massive immigration from Russia. In early 2007, a study ordered by the Israeli Housing and Construction Ministry found that Arad suffered from a negative image, and described it a "settlement that drives residents away".

In 2015, Arad had 10,983 (~45%) salaried workers and 529 (~2.2%) self-employed. 11,805 were receiving children's benefits, 321 were receiving unemployment benefits, and 1,168 were receiving income guarantee. The average monthly income for self-employed workers was NIS 6,934, with salaried employees earning an average of NIS 6,988 (NIS 9,008 for men and NIS 5,184 for women).

The IDF's City of Training Bases, under construction near Beersheba, hopes to bring thousands of soldiers (mostly officers, senior NCOs and other staff) to live in the Negev, including Arad. According to Orli Yehezkel, CEO of the Ministry for the Development of the Negev and Galilee, said NIS 4.5 million will be invested in Arad, including a subsidy of NIS 1,000 per family per month for two years for families of soldiers wishing to move to Arad.

The Negev and Galilee Development Ministry envisions a tripling of Arad's population by 2025.

== Economy ==
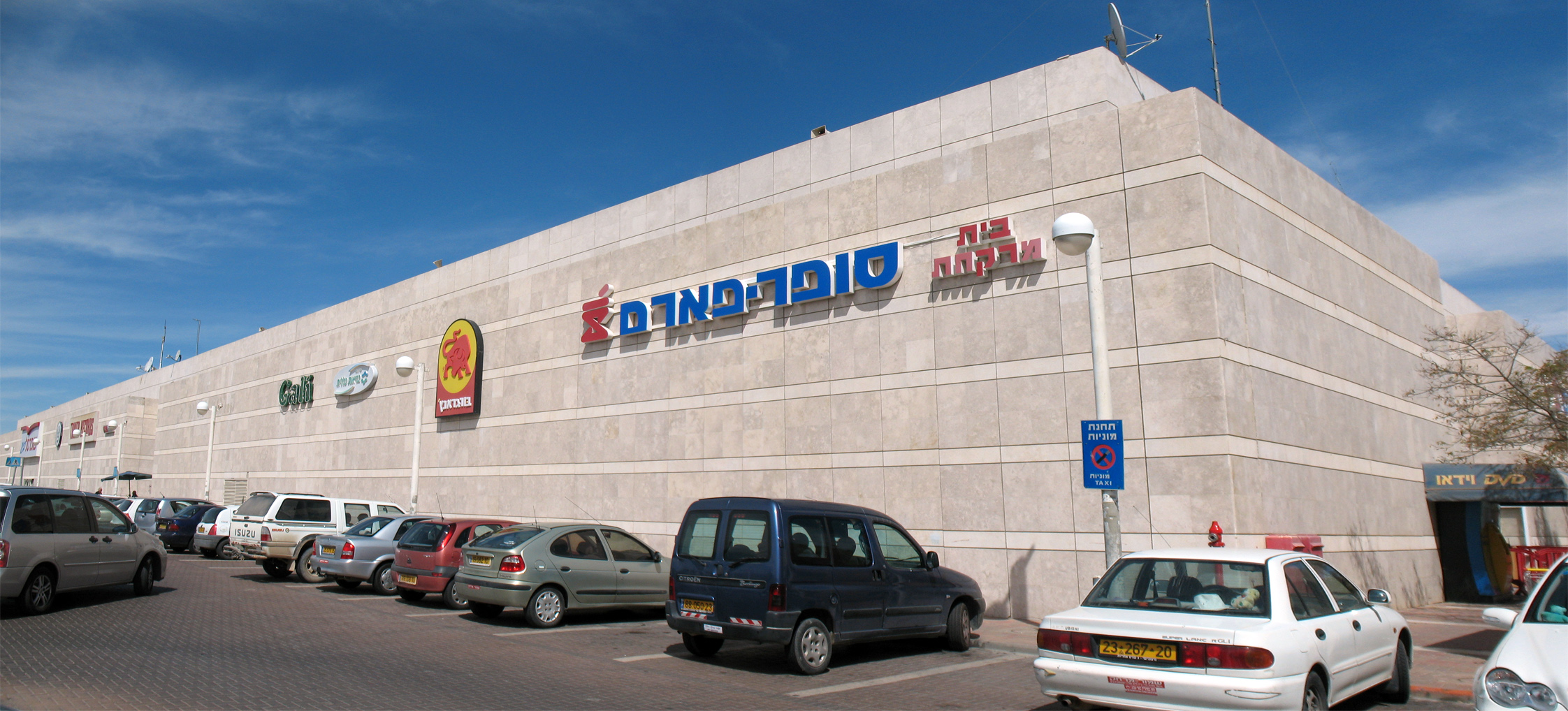
Arad Mall

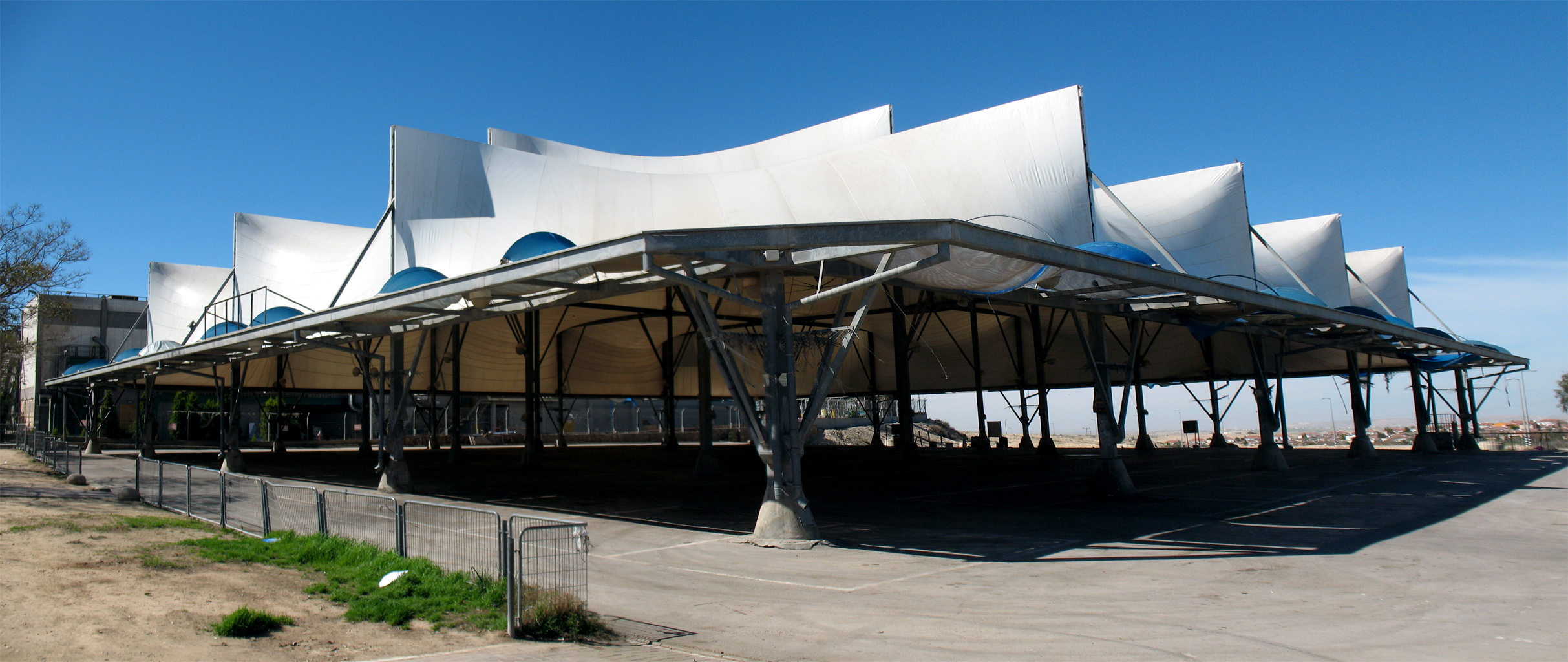
Arad Market on a closed day

Other than tourist venues, Arad's commerce is mostly concentrated in the central commerce area, as envisioned in the original plan. There is one shopping mall in the city, the Arad Mall, in the northern block of the commerce sector. In addition to the main area, there are small shop clusters in most neighborhoods in the city, notably a building called The Star (HaKokhav) in the Tlalim quarter. A lone supermarket outside the center, Mega in the city, is located in the industrial zone, near the entrance to the city, and a major shopping complex is planned near it by a real estate company called Zim Centers. The Arad Market, open on Mondays, is located in the light industry zone.

Among the companies with manufacturing plants in Arad are Arad Textile Industries, one of Israel's largest producers of towels, Flextronics Israel, El-Ran Timber Industries, Jordael who manufacture cosmetic products, and a Unilever Shefa Israel cereal plant.

A.M.S. Electronics is manufacturing printed circuit boards and electronic products. One of Israel's main defense companies, Elbit Systems, manufactures communications systems at a production site in Arad. In 2017, Elbit became a new order for SDR Radios from the than Israeli Ministry of Defense (IMoD) and expected to enlarge the facility.

Since 1971, Arad has been producing phosphoric acid, made from brine collected from the Dead Sea, and phosphates from the nearby Tzefa. Rotem Amfert Negev Ltd, a subsidiary of Israel Chemical Limited, has been planning a new phosphate plant in the Sdeh Brir area. In 2008, the Ministry of the Environment decided not to contest the company's bid, despite studies showing it may increase air pollution-related deaths in the area.

== Tourism ==
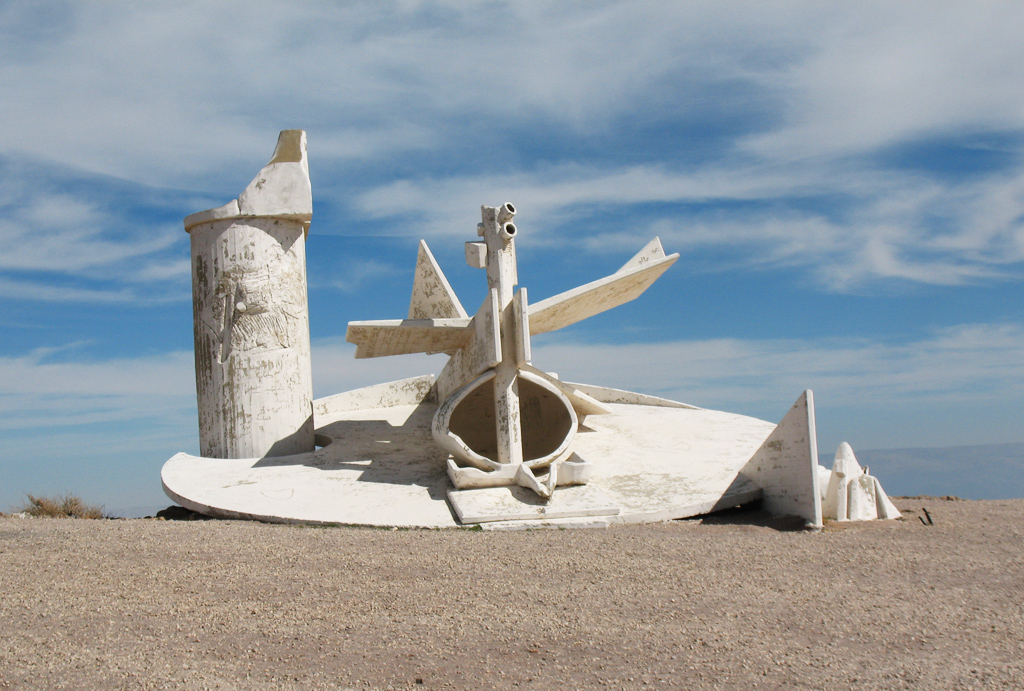
Yigal Tumarkin's monument in the Moav Outlook

In addition to the annual music festival, Arad's fresh air attracts asthmatics from all over the world, and its proximity to the Dead Sea provides a less expensive accommodation alternative to the pricey hotel zone on the sea shore. The Arad municipality has begun to develop hiking and ecological tourism. Additionally, many visitors to Masada stay in Arad, which is the closest (22 km (13.7 mi) by road) urban settlement to the site and provides the only access to its western side. On the outskirts of Arad, near the hotel area, there is a large white monument conceived by Yigal Tumarkin in 1968, called Mitzpe Mo'av (Mo'av Lookout), which also offers a view of the Judean Desert.

The Israel National Trail passes through Arad, between Mount Kina and Tel Arad, a major archeological site and national park. Although not located within Arad's jurisdiction, the Zohar Peak (552 m or 1,811 ft) and Zohar Lookout (Mitzpe Zohar) are common hiking and biking destinations on the national trail. The trails codenamed 11335 and 11240 run along the national trail in this area.

== Culture ==
Arad's main cultural center is the Center for Culture, Youth and Sports (Hebrew: מתנ"ס, Matnas), named after Samuel Rubin and located on Ben Yair Street near the Arad Mall. It was built in 1983 and contains the Arad Museum, Arad's public library, a concert hall and the Arad Visitor Center, founded in 1989.

The Oron movie theater designed by the architect Menachem Cohen closed during the tenure of Mayor Moty Brill. Eshet Lot, an artists quarter, is located in the city's industrial zone, utilizing old warehouses. The city also has a conservatory and concert hall.

In 2007, the Ministry for the Development of the Negev and Galilee proposed moving the national archive of Israel from Jerusalem to Arad and opening a museum.

Arad was known for its annual music festival, first held in 1982. It was a popular event and a major magnet for artists until 1995. On 18 July 1995, three teenagers were crushed to death by a falling gate during a farewell concert by the band Mashina. Despite the festival organizers' attempts to keep the festival going it was cut short. Five of the festival's organizers received prison sentences of up to one year.

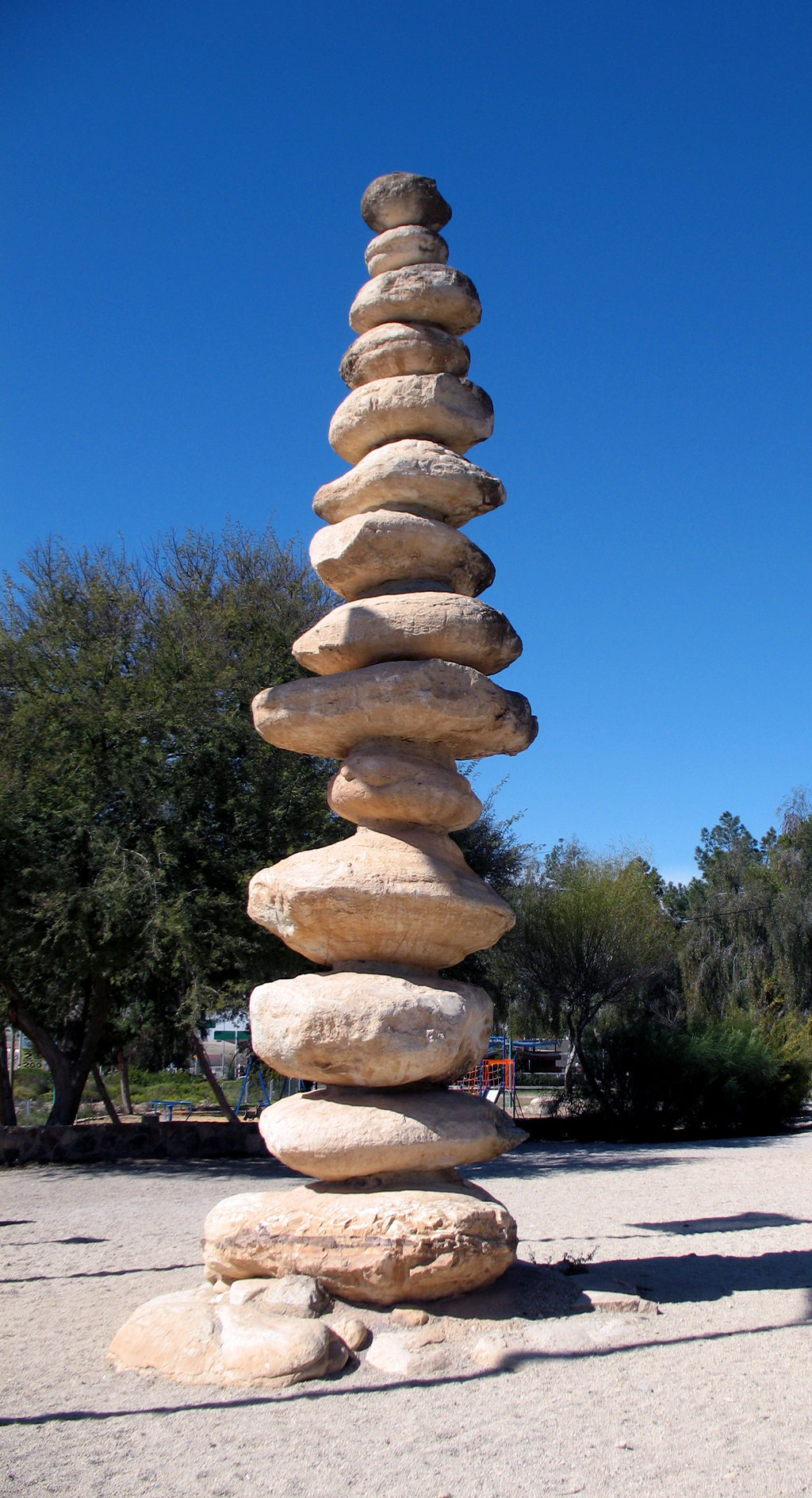
Stone structure in Gan HaHamisha, marking Arad's place in the desert, according to Bedouin tradition

The main public park and picnic area is Arad Park, also called the Ran Grove (after Ran Schochat, who was killed in the Yom Kippur War), which is located about 8 kilometers (5.0 mi) west of the city center and measures 3,000 dunams (3.0 km^{2}; 1.2 sq mi). Other notable parks include:

- Gan HaPsalim (a.k.a. Park HaNsharim), the park at the entrance to the city, with monuments of various desert animals
- Gan HaHamisha (Garden of the Five), a memorial park for the five residents of Arad who were killed in action in the Six-Day War. Includes a monument for the soldiers, as well as a stone structure called Amud HaBulbusim (lit. Pillar of the Potatoes, because of its shape), which marks Arad's place in the desert and their residents' control of the territory according to Bedouin tradition – designed by Yona Pitelson.
- Northern Park, to the north of the Halamish neighborhood
- Gan Harpatka'ot (Adventure Park), a large playground and open grass area in the Rishonim neighborhood

The main cluster of recreational facilities is located in the Ayanot neighborhood also called Kiryat HaSport. Facilities include a swimming pool, tennis courts, a country club and playgrounds. The city's main football stadium is located nearby on the corner of Yehuda and Palmach Streets. The stadium is home to Hapoel Arad, which plays in Liga Bet, the fourth tier of Israeli football.

Since 2000, Arad also hosts an annual mountain biking tournament, Riding Arad, in memory of Itamar Ilya, a soldier killed in action in Lebanon in 1997. In March 2008, the tournament became part of an international Union Cycliste Internationale competition, which is co-hosted by Misgav and Ma'alot. Arad's professional course is 37 kilometers (23.0 mi) long, while the expert course is 22.5 kilometers (14.0 mi).

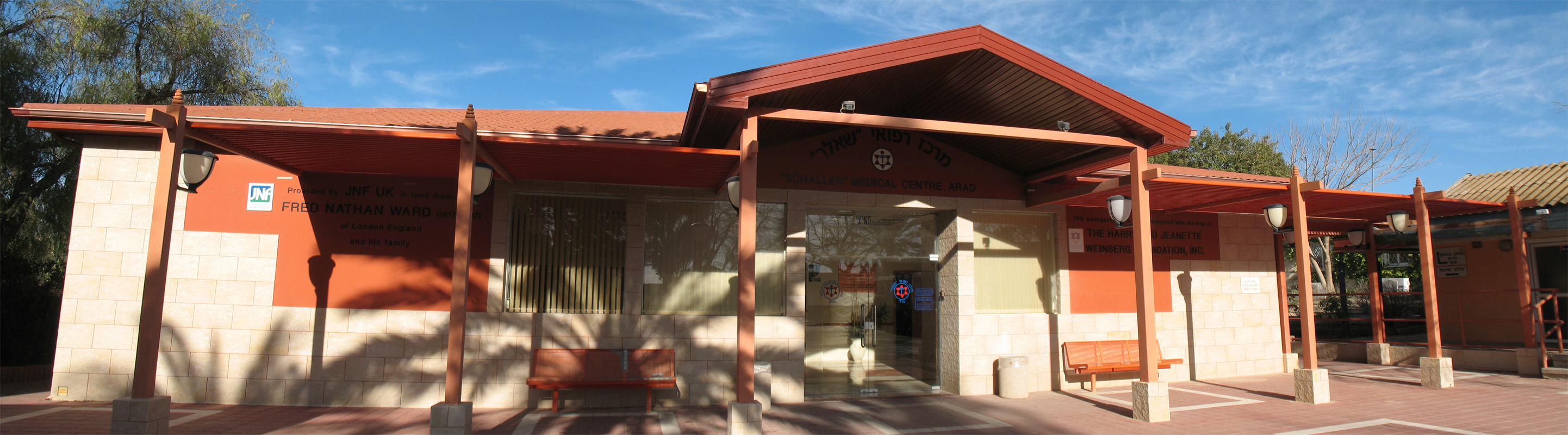
Schaller Medical Centre

== Healthcare ==
Arad does not have a hospital, but there are numerous medical clinics, including Clalit, Leumit and Maccabi. Emergencies are handled by the single Magen David Adom station, located in the municipal compound.

A medical center was also built in the compound in 2004, named Schaller Medical Centre after Leon and Freda Schaller from London, who were the prime donors. It serves as an emergency ward, but does not have the equipment needed to perform operations, and such patients are transferred to the Soroka Medical Center. On average, 10% of the patients are transferred.

== Law enforcement ==
Arad is served by a local Israel Police station, located next to the municipal compound and the Magen David Adom station. It is commanded by Chief Superintendent Danny Kedoshim. Arad's station also serves the Sodom area.

Arad's police force was chosen as the exceptional force for 2007, and awarded an award of excellence on 5 March 2008. Among others, a severe reduction in property crime was cited. Arad's force was able to reduce the number of such crimes from 1,092 in 2003 to just 168 in 2007. On 18 July 2008, Arad police, in a rare incident, shot dead a man threatening to kill his ex-wife with a knife.

== Education and religious institutions ==
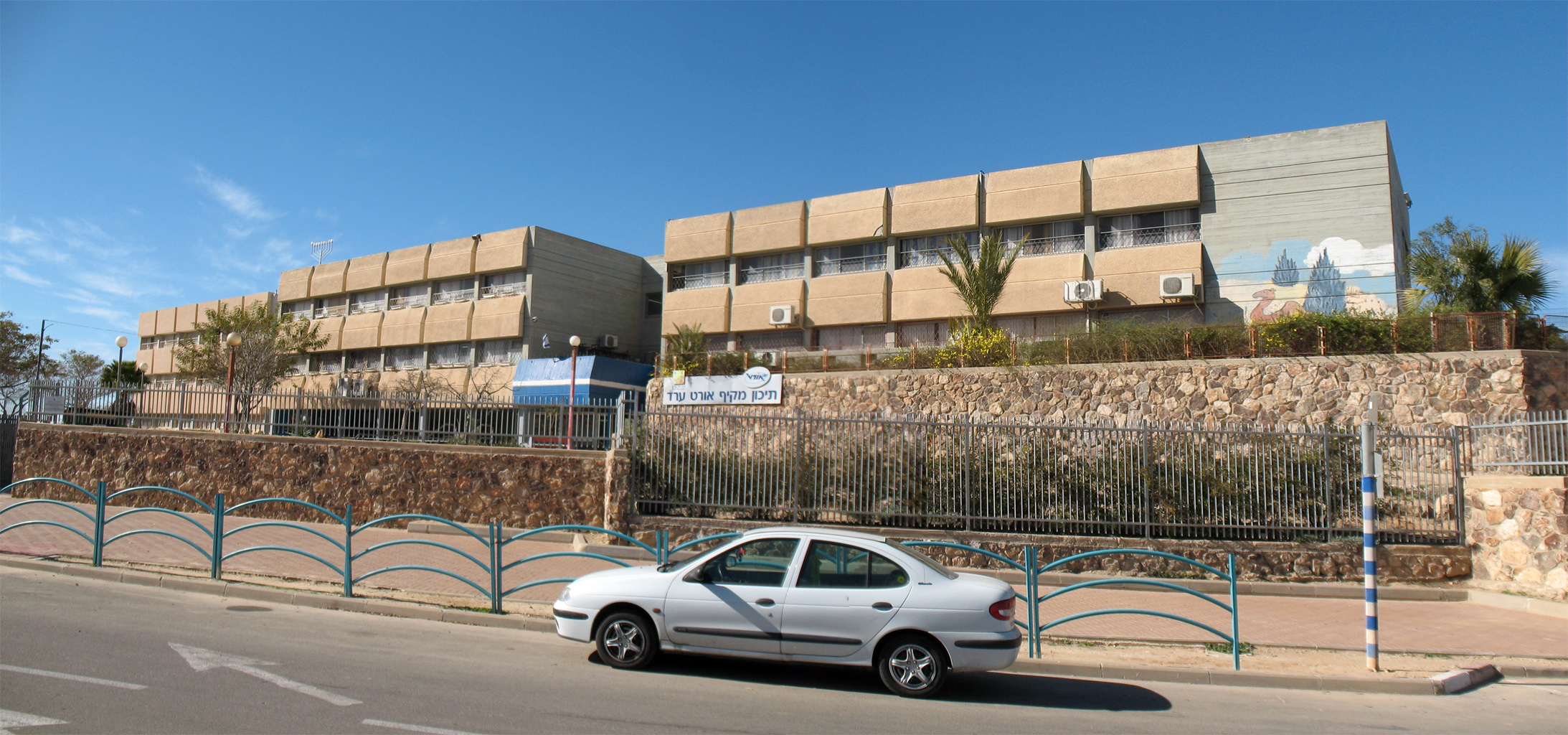
ORT Arad HS, formerly Yigal Allon Junior High

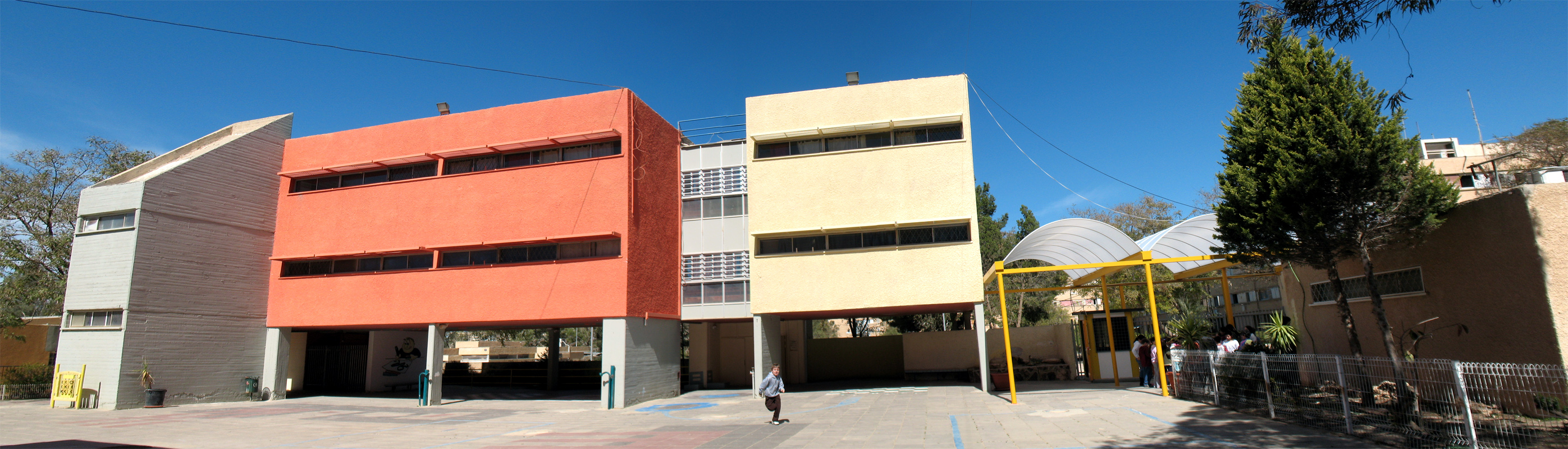
Avishur elementary school

Arad has a public elementary school in every central neighborhood (Tlalim, Avishur, Leva'ot and Ye'elim), while Tlalim is a religious school. There is one public middle school, Re'ut, located near the junction of the Yoshiyahu and HaKana'im streets. The second middle school, Allon, was closed in 2007 and merged into ORT Arad, the city's only public secondary school, which shares a building with the Re'ut middle school and the former Yigal Allon school. In the 2021–22 school year, 71.9% of Arad's 12th graders were eligible for a Bagrut (matriculation) certificate, compared to a national average of 75.9%.

In addition, there are several private and Haredi schools in Arad, such as the Shuvu movement's grades 1–8 school, and the Gerrer Haredi school. Other Haredi schools include the boys' Beit Ya'akov and girls' Kol Ya'akov in the Halamish neighborhood, the Lev Simcha Yeshiva, and the Beit Ya'akov High School. Religious Zionist schools include the Ne'ot Avraham Bnei Akiva Ulpana, which also provides young women with the guidance to perform volunteer activities in the community, and the Tlalim Elementary School, founded in 1971.

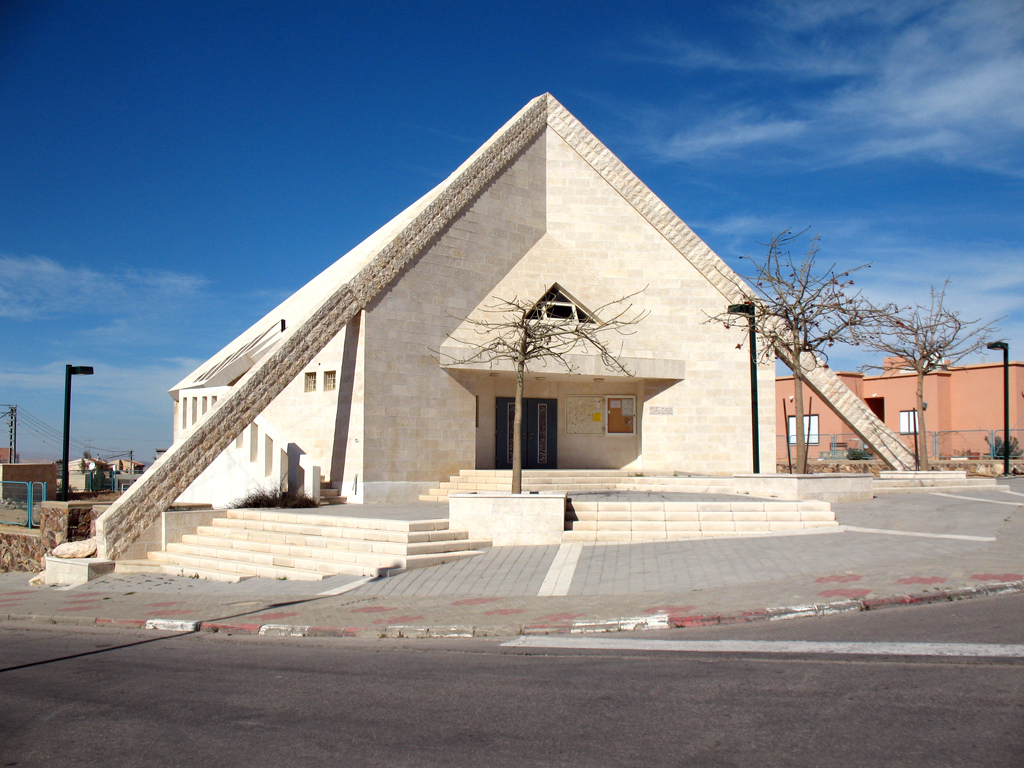
Rotem neighborhood synagogue

SOS Children's Village Arad (known as Kfar Neradim) was built in the southern outskirts of Arad and inaugurated on 27 October 1981. It consists of twelve family houses, to accommodate up to 120 children. There is also an SOS Youth Facility to accommodate 12 to 14 youths from the SOS Children's Village. In January 2005, an SOS Social Centre was opened at Arad. It runs a day-care center and various community outreach programmes to support socially weak families. Until fall 2008, the World Union of Jewish Students (WUJS), funded by Jews from New Jersey, had an institute in Arad which allowed post-college young Jews from around the world to study Israeli society and the Hebrew language. When WUJS's ownership changed, the institute was moved to the center of the country.

Arad has 22 synagogues, of which 11 are Ashkenazi, 9 are Sephardi, one is Yemenite, and one is Ethiopian. Both the central Ashkenazi and Sephardi synagogues are located in the Ye'elim neighborhood. A Masorti synagogue, Shira Hadasha is in the Rishonim neighborhood. There are Gerrer synagogues in Avishur and Halamish, and a Chabad synagogue in Ye'elim. There are two mikvehs in the city–in the Tlalim and Ayanot neighborhoods. The city also has a small Messianic community that is being accused of illegal missionary activities by the Haredim and certain right-wing groups. Arad's dead are mostly buried in the local cemetery, located in the northeastern outskirts of the city, close to the road to Masada.

== Media ==
Arad's local newspaper, Kidod, was published by the entrepreneurs Eli and Rochale Ziv, early founders of Arad. Kidod started as a small leaflet in December 1966 and grew to a become a full paper. At its peak, it was circulated, free of charge, in groceries, kiosks, etc., in 3,000 copies each week. Kidod ran for 23 years and had a key role in the cultural and community life of Arad. HaTzvi Arad is the local newspaper today.

== Transportation ==
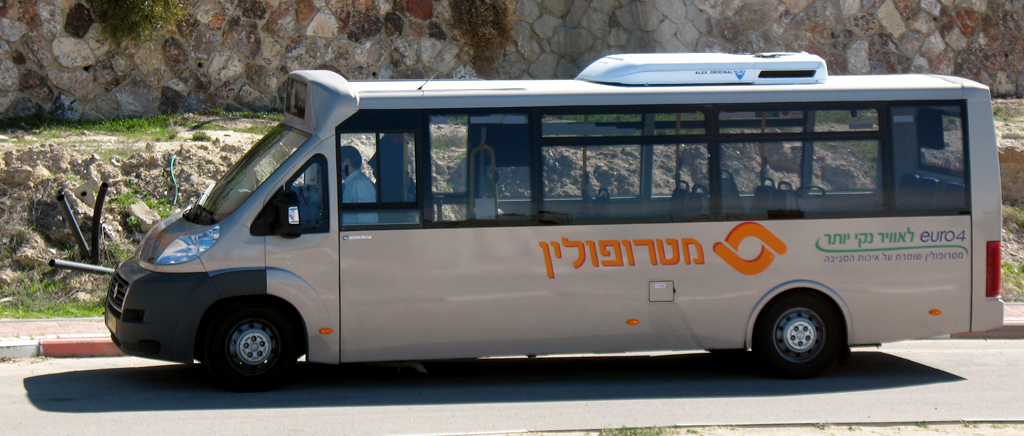
Metropoline mini-bus on the internal Line 1

Arad is reached by Highway 31, which connects it with Beersheba to the west, and the Dead Sea to the east. It has two junctions within Arad's municipal area—the Arad Junction (within the city itself, with Road 3199), and the Tel Arad Junction (with Highway 80). The local Road 3199 connects Arad with Masada, but does not connect to the road next to the dead sea (Highway 90). It is therefore the only way to get to Masada's western side.

Arad's airfield, first used during the music festival of 1994, is located south of the city, and serves domestic flights according to demand. In May 2017, a new railway line to Arad via Kuseife was approved. The line will connect to the existing Beersheba-Dimona rail line at Nevatim. Its terminus will be adjacent to the central bus station.

Arad Central Bus Station, once located on the corner of Yerushalayim Street and Yehuda Street was closed due to a legal battle between the municipality and the Egged Bus Cooperative. A new station was subsequently built with five platforms and a park and ride lot.

Until 2007 all of the buses in Arad were served by Egged Bus Cooperative. But in 2007 Ministry of Transport decided to give most of the Negev bus lines to Metropoline. Since 1st of June 2007 Internal bus lines are served by Metropoline. Inter City Buses in Arad are served by the Egged and Metropoline. A multitude of inter-city bus routes are served by the main station, eight more inter-city Haredi routes which leave from the east, as well as five inner routes (1, 2, 3, 11, 12). The municipal and inter-city routes are :

Line	Route	Company
1	Arad CBS - Hotels (Arad)	Metropoline
2	Arad CBS (Circular Line)	Metropoline
3	Zim Center Arad/Gevim Neighborhood - Rotem Neighborhood (Arad)	Metropoline
11	Artists Quarter - Hotels (Arad)	Metropoline
12	Arad CBS (Circular Line, Regular Route)/ Arad CBS-Artists Quarter (Twice a day Route)	Metropoline
24	Arad CBS - Kuseife - Drijat (Center)	Metropoline
25	Arad CBS - South Hebron Settlements - Carmel (Center)	Metropoline
47	Arad (Harduf Neighborhood) – Dimona (HaShahar Terminal)	Metropoline
384	Beersheba CBS – Arad CBS - Ein Bokek - Masada - Ein Gedi	Egged
386	Arad CBS – Beersheba CBS Express via Route 60	Metropoline
387	Arad CBS - Beersheba CBS Express via Routes 25 and 80	Metropoline
388	Arad CBS – Beersheba CBS via Route 60	Metropoline
389	Arad CBS – Tel Aviv Savidor Train Station	Egged
400	Ein Bokek (Hod Hotel) – Arad CBS - Lehavim (Train Station)	Metropoline
421	Masada - Ein Bokek - Arad CBS – Tel Aviv (Train Station)	Egged
543	Arad (hotels) – Komemiyut/Kiryat Gat	Egged
550	Arad (hotels) – Kiryat Gat - Bnei Brak	Egged
552	Arad (hotels) – Kiryat Gat - Ashdod	Egged
554	Arad (hotels) – Jerusalem CBS/Givat Shaul	Egged
555	Arad (hotels) – Jerusalem CBS/Givat Shaul	Egged
558	Arad (hotels) – Kiryat Gat - Bnei Brak	Egged
559	Arad (hotels) – Beit Shemesh	Metropoline
560	Arad (hotels) – Ashdod	Egged

== Local government ==
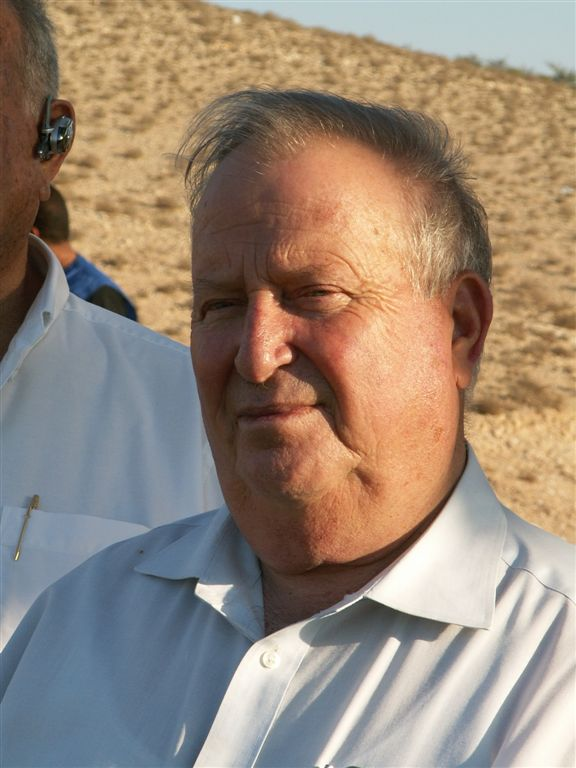
Avraham "Beiga" Shochat, the first elected leader of Arad

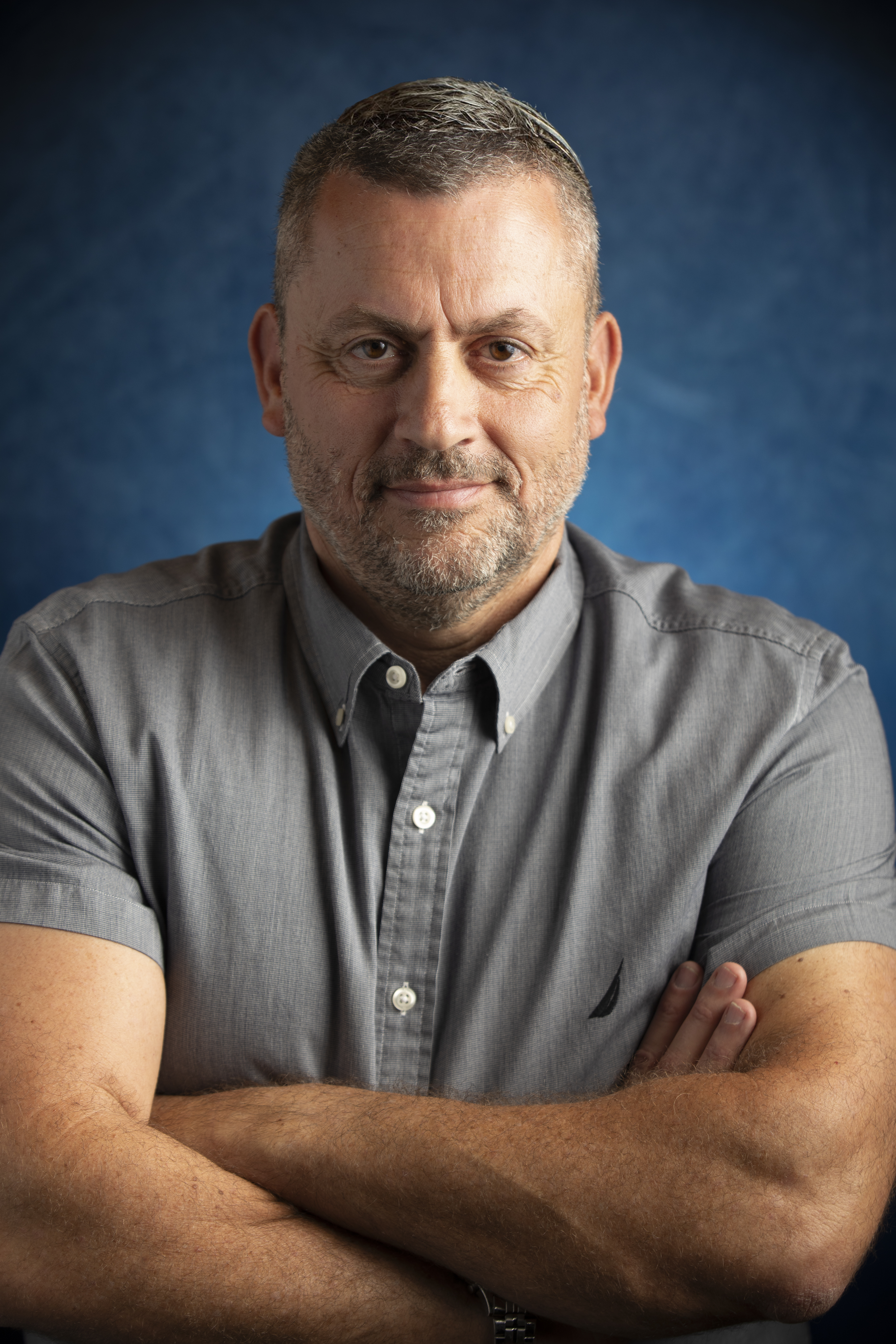
Yair Maayan, current mayor

Arad has, since its inception in 1962, been under the governance of a regional council and local council, before being designated as a city council in 1995. Democratic elections have been held in Arad since 1966, although only Avraham Shochat, Betzalel Tabib and Moty Brill were ever elected or re-elected as the head of the municipality. The first mayor of the city of Arad was Betzalel Tabib who served as both head of the local council and city council. He was replaced by Mordechai Brill in 2003, although due to his inability to pass a yearly budget, Brill was dismissed by the Minister of the Interior Meir Sheetrit in August 2007, and a government-appointed clerk, Gideon Bar-Lev, took his place. An election took place again 13 April 2010, won by Tali Ploskov of the Yisrael Beiteinu party. The longest serving head of Arad's municipality was Avraham Shochat who served as head of the local council between 1967 and 1986.

Arad's yearly budget is over 100 million NIS and over $30 million USD. On 27 December 2007, the 2008 budget was unanimously passed at NIS 123 million by the city council. The city's total income for the year is estimated at NIS 119 million.

Name	Term	Position	Party
Aryeh "Lyova" Eliav	1960 – June 1962	Head of Arad Regional Council	Mapai
Yitzhak Pundak	June 1962 – 1965	Head of Arad Regional Council	
Yitzhak Pundak	1965–1966	Head of local council	
Ze'ev Haimoni	1966–1967	Head of local council	Mapam
Avraham Shochat	1967–1986	Head of local council	Labor
Betzalel Tabib	1986 – 29 June 1995	Head of local council	Labor
Betzalel Tabib	29 June 1995 – October 2003	Mayor	Labor
Mordechai "Moty" Brill	October 2003 – August 2007	Mayor	
Gideon Bar-Lev	October 2007 – April 2010	Mayor	
Tali Ploskov	April 2010 – 2015	Mayor	Yisrael Beiteinu
Nisan Ben Hamo	2015–2024	Mayor	Yesh Atid
Yair Maayan	2024–	Mayor	Likud

While it is not customary for Israeli cities to have major unique/auxiliary laws, many cities have minor laws. In Arad, it is illegal to feed animals in public places. It is also illegal to sell or consume sunflower seeds, peanuts, etc. in public places, due to an anti-littering law enacted in 1965. There are in all 27 auxiliary laws in Arad, which were enacted between 1965 and 2000.

=== Municipal flag and emblem ===
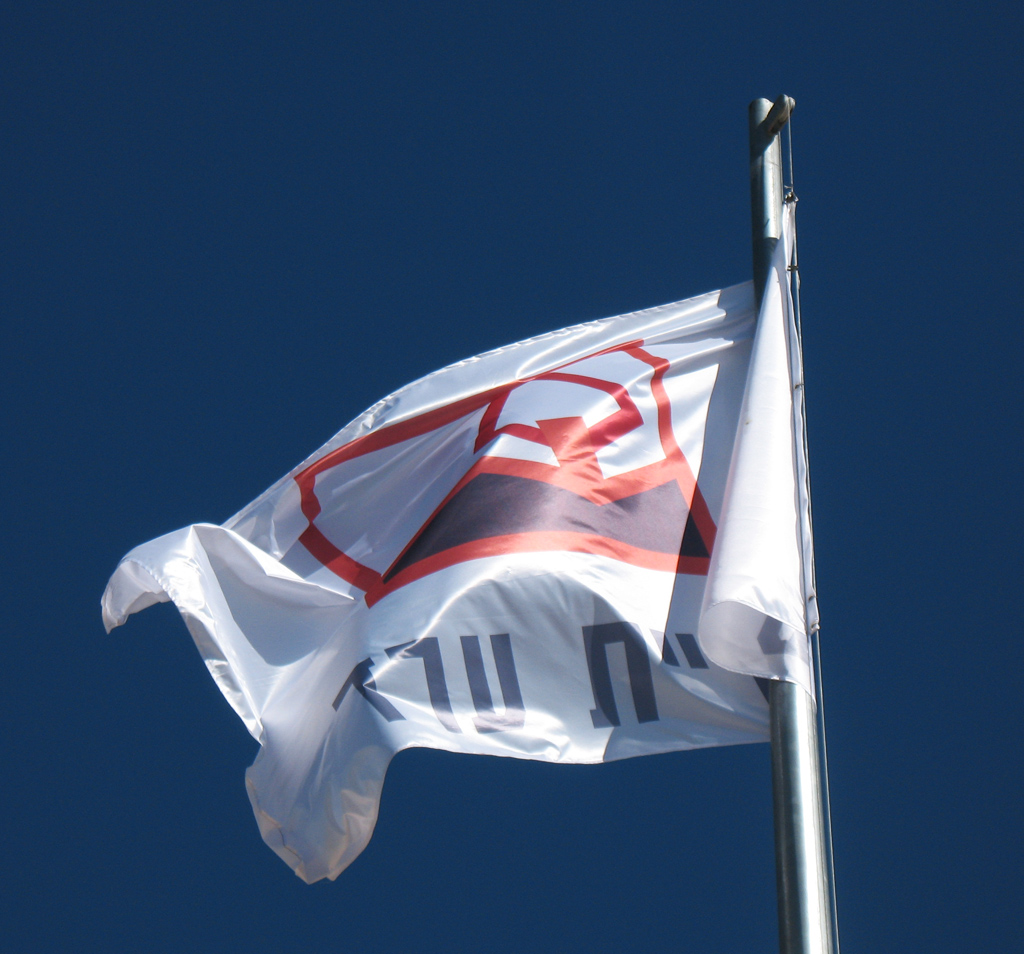
Flag of Arad

The emblem of Arad is a square with a hill and a flame. The hill represents Mount Kidod, a hill in the northeastern part of the city, and the flame represents natural gas, which was extracted in the area in Arad's early days and spurred the city's growth. The emblem was adopted on 19 May 1966. The flag of Arad is a rectangle with a 2:3 ratio, which has a light blue background and shows the emblem in the center with the Hebrew text for "Municipality of Arad" at the top and the English text "City of ARAD Israel" (or variations thereof) and the bottom. This is the de facto flag, and there is no law or edict making it official.

== Voting Patterns ==
In the 2022 election, 56 percent of voters in Arad voted for the parties of the right-wing coalition led by Benjamin Netanyahu, while 41 percent voted for the parties of the center-left coalition led by Yair Lapid and 1 percent voted for the Arab parties.

In the 2026 election, 55 percent of voters in Arad voted for the parties of the right-wing coalition led by Benjamin Netanyahu, while 38 percent voted for the parties of the center-left coalition led by Gadi Eisenkot and 3 percent voted for the Arab parties. An additional 2 percent voted for the Reservists, and 1.1 percent voted for Amcha Yisrael. Voter turnout increased 20 percent from the 2022 election.

== Notable people ==
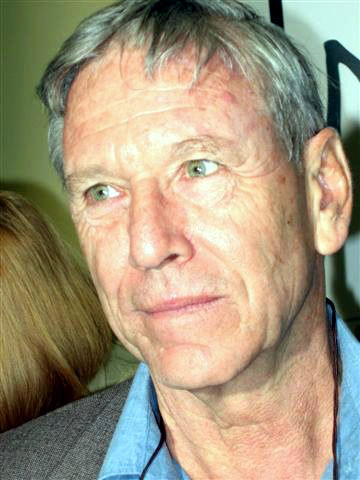
Amos Oz

- Amos Oz (1939–2018), writer
- Ruth Dorrit Yacoby (1952-2015), painter and poet.
- Gal Hirsch (born 1964), Israeli former military commander.

== Twin towns – sister cities ==
- Calama, Chile.
- (United States) Wilmington, Delaware became a sister city of Arad in 1973, to commemorate the 25th anniversary of the State of Israel.
- Dinslaken, Germany signed a twinning agreement with Arad in 1989.
- (United States) Burlington, Vermont developed a sister city relationship with Arad in 1991. Then Mayor Bezalel Tabib, along with Professor Walid Dajani, who represented Bethlehem, visited Burlington to sign a three cities cooperative agreement—the first-ever sister-city pacts among American, Palestinian, and Israeli communities.
