= Samuel Rubin =

Samuel Rubin may refer to:

- Samuel M. Rubin, concessionaire and businessman
- Samuel Rubin (philanthropist), Russian humanitarian and entrepreneur
