= Yacoby =

Yacoby is a surname. Notable people with the surname include:

- Amir Yacoby, American physicist and professor
- Ruth Dorrit Yacoby (1952–2015), Israeli painter and poet.
