= WUJS Arad Institute =

Jewish educational institute in Arad, Israel

The WUJS Arad Institute was a Jewish educational institute in Arad, Israel established in 1968, known in Hebrew as מכון להכשרה וקליטת אקדמיים. In 2006, WUJS Arad came under the sponsorship of Hadassah, the Women's Zionist Organization of America. In 2008, the program relocated to Tel Aviv.

WUJS Arad over the years offered programs ranging from five months to a year, of post-graduate studies for Jewish adults ages 21–35 who completed at least a first degree in college from all over the world, and included classes Ulpan to learn the Hebrew language as well as courses in Jewish and Israel Studies. Four separate study tracks were offered: Land, Language and Society, the core study track; an Arts Track residency program for artists; and the Peace and Social Justice Track, which combined a semester of study in Arad with a semester of interning at Israeli social change organizations and Zman Tel Aviv, with focus on community-related volunteer work in Israel's largest city.

As of 2008, the WUJS Institute has had over 8,000 participants, of whom approximately 25% have made Aliyah to Israel.

== Land Language and Society track ==
The Land Language and Society track offered intense Hebrew Language study, courses in Jewish and Israel Studies, weekly field seminar trips around Israel and many opportunities to interact with Israeli society, especially in the surrounding city of Arad and in the Negev region of Israel.

== WUJS Arad Arts Project ==
The WUJS Institute's Arad Arts Program, founded in 1991, was a subsidized residency for visual artists, musicians, writers, dancers, and choreographers from around the world.

The Arts Project was designed for accomplished artists with experience in their field of creativity. Applicants were required hold an academic degree and be above age 21. The Project also features an intensive Hebrew Ulpan (language acquisition) program.

The culmination of the Arts Project was an Art Exhibition of the participant artists and their works in both Arad and in the heart of Tel Aviv.

In addition to fostering global artistic talent, the WUJS Arad Arts Project, established in 1991, uniquely combined residency for visual artists, writers, musicians, and choreographers with an immersive Hebrew Ulpan program. Geared towards skilled artists above the age of 21, the project offered a platform for creative exchange and culminated in a vibrant art exhibition, showcasing participants' diverse works in both Arad and the vibrant cityscape of Tel Aviv.

== WUJS Arad Peace and Social Justice Program ==
The WUJS Institute's Peace and Social Justice Program (PSJ), was a combination of Hebrew language instruction, Israel studies and an internship in a social change organization in Israel.

The PSJ Program ran two semesters. The first semester was based in the WUJS Institute in Arad, while the second semester, an internship placement in a social change organization, was located elsewhere in Israel. This ten-week internship with an approved social change organization consisted of 30 hours per week. The organizations in which interns were placed work to strengthen democracy and support social justice in areas such as: civil and human rights, the status of women, Jewish-Arab coexistence, religious pluralism and tolerance, social and economic equality immigrant absorption and the environment.

== Zman Tel Aviv ==
The Zman Tel Aviv Track at WUJS Arad was scheduled to open in September 2008. The track consisted of a five-month community service internship period in the city of Tel Aviv. Projects available for the internees include work in art and cultural promotion, public relations, work in local media, and more.

== Program operation changes ==
In June 2008, the decision was made to close the WUJS facility in Arad and to relocate in Jerusalem and Tel Aviv under the management of Hadassah's Young Judaea in Israel. The program in Arad closed on September 24, 2008. The program was given the name WUJS Israel. The first session of WUJS Israel, including the new Tel Aviv track, opened on September 2, 2008. Subsequent sessions are scheduled to open annually in January and August. In July 2012, Young Judaea Israel Spined off from Hadassah to Independence and WUJS Israel became a program solely run by Young Judaea Israel with locations in The Florentine neighborhood of Tel Aviv and Merkaz HaCarmel in Haifa. Today the program offers personally tailored professional internships, Hebrew studies, and weekly educational excursions.
