= Ruth Dorrit Yacoby =

Israeli artist

- Born: רות דורית יעקובי; 28 April 1952; Moshav Arbel, Israel
- Died: 5 November 2015 (aged 63); Beersheba, Israel
- Website: ruthdorrityacoby.com

Ruth Dorrit Yacoby (Hebrew: רות דורית יעקובי; 28 April 1952 – 5 November 2015) was an Israeli painter and poet.

== Biography ==
Yacoby was born in the Galilee to Canadian- and Iraqi-born immigrants Hilda (née Lyons) and Avraham Ezekiel, and was raised in Moshav Arbel. She married Giora Yacoby on completion of her service in the Artillery Corps in 1972, and the two moved to Beersheba in 1976. There, she studied behavioural sciences at Ben-Gurion University of the Negev and painting at the Visual Arts College. She went on to continue her artistic training at the Teachers Training College in Ramat Hasharon.

Her first solo exhibition, entitled "Woman on an Illuminated Table," was held at the Israel Museum in 1987. Yacoby's work has been since displayed at museums and galleries across Israel, as well as in Canada, Japan, Cuba, China, Thailand, Singapore, South Korea, Mexico, Peru, Argentina, Chile, and the Vatican.

She died of cancer on 5 November 2015.

== Awards and Exhibitions ==
Over thirty years of artistic activity, Yacoby was awarded numerous grants, prizes, and honors: Sharett Cultural Foundation Grant Keren Sharett: 1981, 1986 Ministry of Education Award: 1988, 1996, 2004 Canada Council for the Arts Award: 1989, 1992, 1995, 1998 America-Israel Cultural Foundation Award: 1992 Mifal HaPais Award for the Arts: 1996, 2004, 2008 Michel Kikoine Prize: The Genia Schreiber University Art Gallery, Tel Aviv University (2010)ExhibitionsYacoby held numerous solo exhibitions in prominent museums and galleries in Israel and internationally. Solo Exhibitions in Israel (Selection) Arad Contemporary Art Museum: 1980, 1994 The Israel Museum, Jerusalem: 1987 Rehovot Municipal Art Gallery: 1989 Mishkan Museum of Art, Ein Harod: 1989 The Avraham Baron Art Gallery, Ben-Gurion University of the Negev, Beer Sheva: 1989, 1996, 2000, 2004 Herzliya Museum of Contemporary Art: 1994 Tel Aviv Museum of Art: 1997 International Solo Exhibitions & Activity (Selection) Germany: Museums across Germany (1990, 1991, 1992, 1993, 1994, 1995, 1996, 1998, 2004) United States: 1990, 1995 Canada: Museums across Canada (1991, 1992, 1995) Japan: Tokyo, Osaka, and Kobe (1996); 1999 East & Southeast Asia: Thailand (1996), Taiwan (1996), China (1996), Singapore (1996)South Korea: 1997, 1998 Latin America: Mexico City, Mexico (1998); Argentina (1999); Lima, Peru (1999); Santiago, Chile (2005); Uruguay (2005, 2006) Vatican City: Vatican Art Gallery (2000).

== Awards and Grants ==
- 1981, 1986, 1995 – Creative Excellence Award, Sharett Cultural Foundation / America-Israel Cultural Foundation
- 1988 – Minister of Education and Culture Award for Painting and Sculpture
- 1989, 1992 – Visual Arts Project Grant, Canada Council for the Arts
- 1996 – Creative Grant, Ministry of Education and Culture
- 2004 – Encouragement of Creativity Award, Visual Arts Department, Culture Administration, Ministry of Education, Culture and Sport
- 2006 – Support Grant, Mifal HaPais Council for Culture and Art
- 2010 – Michel Kikoine Prize, The Genia Schreiber University Art Gallery, Tel Aviv University
- 2018 – Support Grant for Digital Catalog Creation, Mifal HaPais Council for Culture and Art

== The Evolution of the Works ==
Yacoby created her works outdoors, in a courtyard facing a rocky hill and an arid wadi on the edge of the desert. She worked under harsh conditions, utilizing materials found in her immediate environment. Over the years, she learned to create art in modest conditions whose richness derived from a vivid imagination and visions. "I do not create in a studio, but outdoors, allowing the elements: rain, intense heat, dryness to participate in the creative process," Yacoby said. "In a way, my works, even those hanging in a museum, continue to take shape. Unlike classical works of art that appear complete, final, and concluded, my works continue to evolve; they are influenced by the viewing audience. In every country where I exhibited, cultural markers of that place were added to the works. Through their very involvement, the viewers influence the art. There is no sense of finality, but rather of constant becoming and transformation."

Professor Mordechai Omer, former Director and Chief Curator of the Tel Aviv Museum of Art, remarked on Yacoby's creation: "It is rooted in a private psychic realm that understands suffering as an existential condition of enduring primordiality. The occurrences within the soul, much like the world of phenomena and nature, are experienced as expressions of magical forces and as the embodiment of a spiritual element that seems to unify the entire world. This existential state of being is close to religious and mystical experience and to the realm of ancient myth, and is therefore interpreted as a journey: a transformative process of consciousness and spirit, akin to the journey of mythical heroes into the underworld and back to the living world, or the soul's journey toward redemption and eternity. In Yacoby's work, this journey unfolds between the poles of birth, death, and rebirth, in a circular movement that heralds life out of death. Encompassing the epic dimensions of such a spiritual journey requires a total and religious act of art, in which painting, object, and human bodily action are perceived as conductors of magical forces - as tools for purification and healing made possible only through their reciprocal interaction and co-placement within a space serving as their sanctuary. Within this space, Yacoby's journey condenses from the heart of private existence into a spiritual entity embodied in the figure of the Great Mother an entity that enables her to bind the personal with the collective in her role as the mother of life and death, as one who laments while simultaneously granting life and bringing healing and restoration." (From a solo exhibition catalog, The Genia Schreiber University Art Gallery, Tel Aviv University, 2011)

== Selected Solo Exhibitions ==
- 1986 – "Works, 1985–1986", Arad Museum; Curator: Miri Taragan (Catalog)
- 1987 – "Special Display", The Israel Museum, Jerusalem; Curator: Yigal Zalmona (Pamphlet)
- 1989 – Rehovot Municipal Art Gallery; Curator: Ada Naamani (Pamphlet)
- 1989 – "Fragile Skin", The Avraham Baron Art Gallery, Ben-Gurion University, Beer Sheva; Curator: Haim Finkelstein (Catalog)
- 1989 – Mishkan Museum of Art, Ein Harod; Curator: Galia Bar Or (Catalog)
- 1990 – "Works, 1987–1990", Ami Steinitz Gallery for Contemporary Art, Tel Aviv (Pamphlet)
- 1991 – "Signs of War", Traveling exhibition in Canada and Germany
- 1992 – "New Works", Galerie am Dammbach, Aachen, Germany; Curator: Edwin Hellman (Catalog; Text: Gabriele Uelsberg)
- 1992 – "500 Years Since the Expulsion from Spain", Saidye Bronfman Centre for the Arts, Montreal; Curator: Gisèle Amsellem-Garson (Pamphlet; Text: Judy Mastai)
- 1992 – "Woman Holding the Stream of Her Life", Daphna Naor Contemporary Art Gallery, Jerusalem
- 1993 – "Woman Holding Chaos and Pain", PCI Gallery, Heidelberg; Ayala Gallery, Berlin; Curator: Senta Ziller (Pamphlet)
- 1994 – "Vessel of the Soul", Arad Museum; Curator: Miri Taragan (Catalog)
- 1994 – Herzliya Museum of Art; Curator: Yoav Dagon (Catalog; Text: Yoav Dagon, Gabriele Uelsberg)
- 1994 – "Vessel of the Soul", Sarah Levi Gallery, Tel Aviv
- 1995 – "Flying Woman and White Drift", North Dakota Museum of Art, Grand Forks; Jewish Community Centre, Vancouver, Canada; Curators: Judy Mastai, Laurel Ritter (Catalog; Text: Gabriele Uelsberg)
- 1995 – "Woman/Color", Mendel Art Gallery, Saskatoon, Saskatchewan, Canada; Curator: Judy Mastai (Text)
- 1995 – "Vessel of the Soul", The School of Visual Theatre Gallery, Jerusalem; Curator: Nili Goren (Text)
- 1995 – "Letters to Yael: Journey to Osaka", Kibbutz Nachshon Gallery; Curator: Nili Wiesel (Text)
- 1996 – "Rooms of Existence", Mülheim Museum of Contemporary Art, Germany; Curator and Catalog: Dr. Gabriele Uelsberg
- 1996 – "Flying Woman and the Vessel of the Soul", Museum of Contemporary Art, Osaka, Japan; Curator: Naoto Oguchi (Catalog; Text: Tami Katz-Freiman)
- 1996 – "Vessel of the Soul", Kobe Gallery, Japan; Curator: Shironouchi Shimazu (Catalog; Text: Tami Katz-Freiman)
- 1996 – "Vessel of the Soul", Wan Fung Art Gallery, Beijing, China; Curator: Prof. Parnes (Catalog)
- 1996 – "Flying Woman and the Vessel of the Soul", Notices The Gallery, Singapore; Curator: Mei-Den Kersterenbo (Catalog; Text: Tami Katz-Freiman)
- 1996 – "Flying Woman and the Vessel of the Soul", Taipei Fine Arts Museum, Taiwan; Curator: Pan-Wei Chang (Catalog; Text: Haim Finkelstein, Tami Katz-Freiman)
- 1997 – "Floating in Fragile Light", Tel Aviv Museum of Art; Curator: Varda Steinlauf (Catalog)
- 1997 – "Flying Woman", Rosita Gallery, Cologne; Curator: Maria Buchwald
- 1997–1998 – "To Have and to Hold", Songwon Gallery, Gwangju; Munhwa Ilbo Gallery, Seoul, South Korea (Catalog; Text: Daria Kassovsky)
- 1998 – "The Secret Rose Garden of the Angels", Museo del Chopo, Mexico City, Mexico; Curators: Laurence Monjas, Adriana Lorias (Text)
- 1999 – "The Secret Rose Garden of the Angels", Museo de la Nación, Lima, Peru; Curators: Delgado, Watanabe (Catalog)
- 2001 – "Woman Holding the Sun and the Moon", Kobe Gallery; Center for Contemporary Art, Sebiya, Japan; Curator: Shironouchi Shimazu (Text)
- 2001 – "Woman Holding a Sun", Centro Cultural Recoleta, Buenos Aires, Argentina; Curator: Beatriz Ventura (Pamphlet)
- 2001 – "Gate of Tears, Rain of Roses", Pontifical Council for Culture of the Holy See, The Vatican; Curator: Alfredo Luciani (Catalog; Text: Haviva Pedaya)
- 2001 – "Gate of Tears, Rain of Roses", Arton Center for Art, Ben-Gurion University, Beer Sheva
- 2004 – "For You Light My Lamp", Körnerpark Gallery, Berlin; Curator: Dorothea Kolland
- 2004 – "The Woman of a Thousand Voices", Santiago Museum of Contemporary Art, Santiago, Chile; Curator: Paulina Lucas
- 2005 – "The Woman of a Thousand Voices", Pueblo Blanco, Punta del Este, Uruguay
- 2005 – "The Woman of a Thousand Voices", Museo del Gaucho, Montevideo, Uruguay
- 2006 – "The Woman of a Thousand Voices", Center for Art and Creativity, Arad (Permanent Display)
- 2011 – "The Woman of a Thousand Voices", The Genia Schreiber University Art Gallery, Tel Aviv University
- 2015 – "Garments: Ruth Dorrit Yacoby and Bouthaina Milhem", The George Shrut Senate Gallery, Ben-Gurion University of the Negev (Catalog; Text: Haim Maor)
- 2022 – "Ruth Dorit Yacoby: The Door to the Secret Garden", Herzliya Museum of Contemporary Art; Curator: Hadas Kedar

---

== Selected Group Exhibitions ==
- 1984 – Ahad Ha'am 90 Gallery, Tel Aviv; Curator: Ami Steinitz
- 1985 – Ahad Ha'am 90 Gallery, Tel Aviv; Curator: Ami Steinitz
- 1985 – "Sharett Cultural Foundation / America-Israel Cultural Foundation Recipients," Tel Aviv Museum of Art
- 1985 – "Israeli Art: The 1980s" Mary-Anne McCarthy Gallery, New York; Curator: Mary Evangelista (Catalog)
- 1987 – "Calling Card," Bezalel Gallery, Jerusalem; Curator: Gideon Ofrat (Text)
- 1987 – "On the Ground," Kalisher 5 Gallery, Tel Aviv
- 1988 – "Fresh Paint: The Younger Generation in Israeli Art," Tel Aviv Museum of Art and The Israel Museum, Jerusalem; Curators: Ellen Ginton, Yigal Zalmona
- 1988 – "Yetziramon" Mitzpe Ramon; Curator: Gideon Ofrat
- 1988 – "The Feminine Presence," Tel Aviv Museum of Art; Curator: Ellen Ginton (Catalog)
- 1991 – "Summer 1991: Israeli Art Now" Tel Aviv Museum of Art; Curator: Ellen Ginton (Catalog)
- 1991 – "The Absent Present: The Empty Chair in Israeli Art," The Genia Schreiber University Art Gallery, Tel Aviv University; Curator: Mordechai Omer (Catalog)
- 1991 – "Pershing 91," Arts House, Jaffa; Curator: Ruti Director (Catalog)
- 1991 – "The Void in Contemporary Israeli Art," The Art Workshop, Yavne; Curator: Monica Lavi (Catalog)
- 1992 – "Painting Flowers Now," Rehovot Municipal Art Gallery; Curator: Ada Naamani (Postcards)
- 1992 – "From the Ends of the West: 500 Years Since the Expulsion from Spain," Jerusalem Theatre; Artists' House, Tel Aviv; Curator: Haim Finkelstein (Catalog)
- 1992 – "Afterword: Representations of the End in Contemporary Israeli Art," The Genia Schreiber University Art Gallery, Tel Aviv University; Curator: Tami Katz-Freiman (Catalog)
- 1992 – "Aiala Zacks Abramov Collection," The Israel Museum, Jerusalem
- 1993 – "The Limit of Realism," Tel Aviv Museum of Art; Curator: Ellen Ginton (Catalog)
- 1994 – "Hidden First Person" Janco-Dada Museum, Ein Hod; Bat Yam Museum; The Art Workshop, Yavne; Curator: Monica Lavi (Catalog)
- 1995 – "Dialogue," Cosmos Gallery, Vienna; Kunsthalle Graz, Austria; Curator: Talia Rapaport (Catalog)
- 1995 – "Vessels of Spirit," Merkin Gallery, New York; Curator: Talia Rapaport (Catalog)
- 1996 – "Limburg Castle," Dürkheim, Germany; Curator: Heinz Thiel (Text)
- 1996 – "Blue and White," Bineth Gallery, Tel Aviv; Curator: Talia Rapaport (Catalog)
- 1996 – "Healing the Rift II," Yadayim Gallery, Tel Aviv; Curator: Vered Shomron (Catalog)
- 1996 – "Between Choice and Dilemma: Women Against Violence," Mishkenot Sha'ananim, Jerusalem; Traveling exhibition in the United States; Curator: Ayana Friedman (Catalog)
- 1996 – "Portraits" Tel Aviv Museum of Art; Curator: Mordechai Omer (Catalog)
- 1996* – "A Decade of the Minister of Education and Culture Award" Tel Aviv Museum of Art (Catalog)
- 1997 – "Women Against Violence" Hebrew Union College, New York; Traveling exhibition in the United States; Curator: Ayana Friedman (Catalog)
- 1997 – "Portraits" Bat Yam Museum; Curator: Doron J. Lurie (Text)
- 1997 – Art Triennale, New Delhi, India; Curator: Nella Cassouto (Catalog)
- 1997 – "Miniature" Traveling exhibition in Italy; Curator: Talia Rapaport (Catalog)
- 1997 – "Israeli Women Artists of the 1980s," Artists' House, Haifa; Curator: Ilana Tenenbaum (Catalog)
- 1998 – "Selection from the Joseph Hackmey Collection – The Israel Phoenix," Tel Aviv Museum of Art; Curator: Mordechai Omer (Catalog)
- 1999 – "Plasmo," Outdoor exhibition, São Paulo, Brazil; Curator: Philippe Mouillon (Pamphlet)
- 2000 – "The Human Figure in the Third Millennium," The Vatican; Curator: Alfredo Luciani (Text)
- 2002 – "Matter as Spirit, Spirit as Matter," Umm al-Fahm Art Gallery
- 2003 – "Art of the 1980s," Oranim College Gallery, Kiryat Tivon; Curator: Idit Levavi | "The Wandering Library," side event at the Venice Biennale; Artists' Museum, Łódź, Poland; Curator: Doron Polak
- 2005 – "Orim: Lights in Art and Tradition," The Israel Museum, Jerusalem; Curator: Amitai Mendelsohn (Catalog)
- 2008 – "Disappearing Faces," Museum of Art, Toulon, France; Curator: Itzhak Goldberg (Catalog)
- 2010 – "Dealing with God," Israeli Art Gallery in Kiryat Tivon; Curator: Efrat Sadeh (Pamphlet)
- 2022 – "Material Imagination: Israeli Art from the Museum's Collection," Tel Aviv Museum of Art; Curator: Dalit Matatyahu
