= Samuel M. Rubin =

American businessman (1918–2004)

Samuel M. Rubin (May 24, 1918 – February 5, 2004) was an American concessionaire and businessman. He is best known for introducing popcorn to movie theaters in New York in the 1930s, earning him the nickname "Sam the Popcorn Man".

== Life ==
Rubins sold pretzels at age 6 and flags at 9. He started selling popcorn in Long Island City, New York and then at the age of 12 starting selling in theaters. He is the probable pioneer of the widespread use of popcorn machines in theaters.

Rubin got the idea after watching popcorn being made in Oklahoma City around 1930. There is some uncertainty about whether Rubin was the first to sell popcorn in theaters — his daughter and a former partner do not remember Rubin selling popcorn in quantity until the 1950s — but he is widely recognized for popularizing the practice.

Rubin sold other snacks as well, and is responsible for creating large, "movie sized" candy bars and boxes.

Rubin worked for ABC Vending and its predecessors from the age of 12, when he sold candy, to shortly before his death, by which time he was a regional vice president. He managed concessions for several major movie theater chains and Broadway theatres, as well as several sports stadiums, Central Park, and the Empire State Building. He also owned about 10 movie theaters.
