= Misgav Ladach =

Coordinates: 31°45′40.44″N 35°12′37.94″E

- Kupat Holim Meuhedet
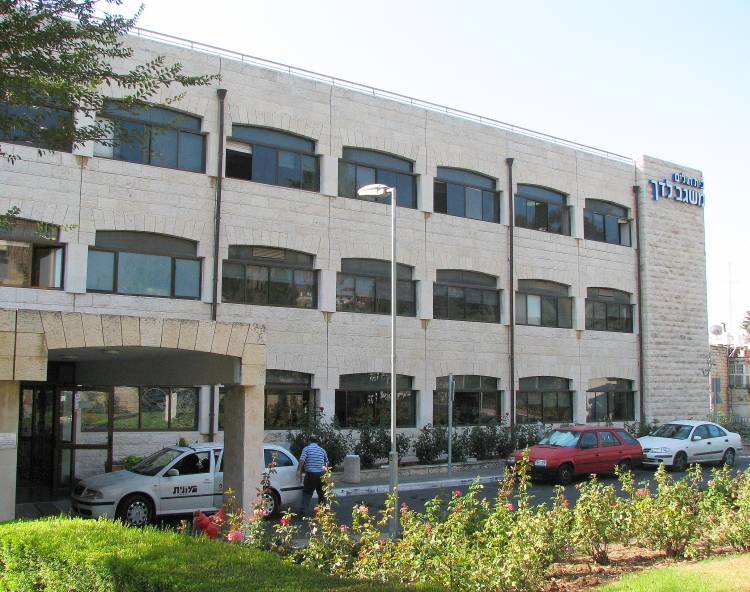
- Misgav Ladach hospital, Jerusalem

Geography
- Location: Jerusalem

Organisation
- Type: General
- Religious affiliation: Jewish

History
- Opened: 1854

Misgav Ladach (Hebrew: מִשְׂגָּב לַדָּךְ) is a Jewish hospital in Katamon, Jerusalem that belongs to Kupat Holim Meuhedet, Israel's third largest health insurance organisation.

== Etymology ==
The name of the hospital, literally "refuge for the suffering," derives from Psalms 9:10.

== History ==
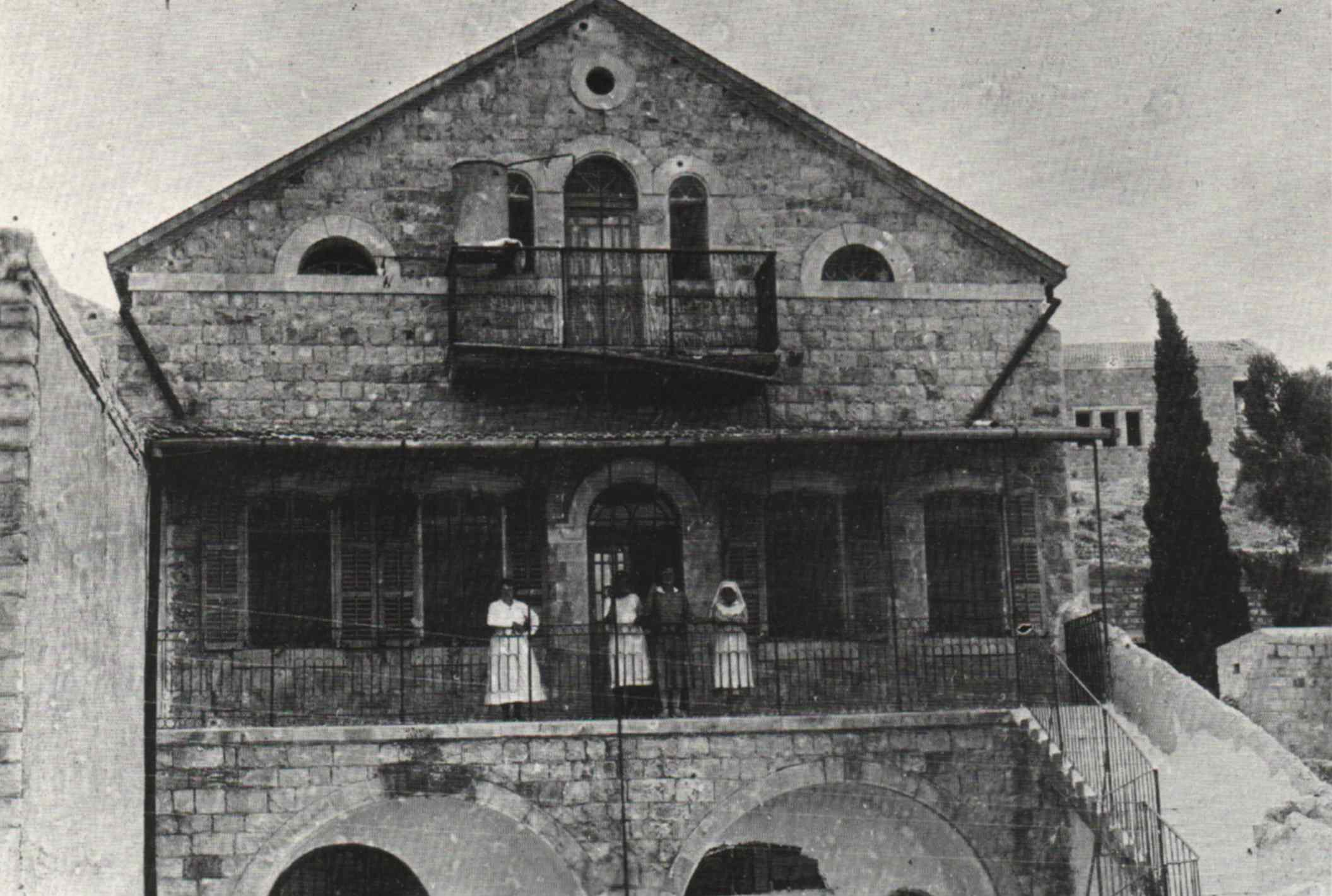
Misgav Ladach's original premises, 1915

Misgav Ladach hospital (originally known as Mayer Rothschild Hospital) was established in 1854 (or according to some sources 1855) in the Old City of Jerusalem, funded by the French Rothschild family. When the Rothschild hospital moved outside of the Old City, the Misgav Ladach society took over the hospital and renamed it. The hospital, founded to enable the Jews to be independent of Christian missionary hospitals, served the city's Jewish population in this location until the Israeli 1948 Arab–Israeli War in 1948, when the Jordanian army conquered the Jewish Quarter. The hospital reopened in Katamon in western Jerusalem, where it operated for 40 years as a maternity hospital. After moving into new premises, a 6,700-sq.m., three-story building on Hizkiyahu Hamelech Street, the non-profit Sephardi organization that owned it went bankrupt. The building was purchased by Kupat Holim Meuhedet, renovated and reopened in 2005. In 2022, Meuhedet announced the hospital will be renovated and turned over to its subsidiary management company Medica. The hospital has four operating rooms, an image lab with ultrasound, mammography, MRI, X-ray and bone density testing, a sleep laboratory and phototherapy.

== Medical innovations ==
=== Misgav Ladach method ===
The Misgav Ladach method for Cesarean section was developed by Michael Stark based on the Joel-Cohen incision originally introduced for hysterectomy. The technique was first introduced at Misgav Ladach and is now being used in medical centers around the world. The Misgav Ladach method eliminates many conventional steps, resulting in a quicker birth, less trauma for the mother and more rapid recovery. There is less need for painkillers and antibiotics, less scarring, less bleeding and less need for anaesthesia. Risk of exposure to HIV is minimized and the speed of the operation saves operating room and staff time.

=== Natural childbirth ===
In the 1980s and early 1990s, Misgav Ladach was known for its personalized approach to childbirth. The hospital was an early supporter of natural childbirth techniques and the presence of fathers in the delivery room.

== Medical directors ==
- Maccabi Salzberger
- Michael Stark

== See also ==
- Health in Israel
- Healthcare in Israel
- Science and technology in Israel
