= Healthcare in Israel =

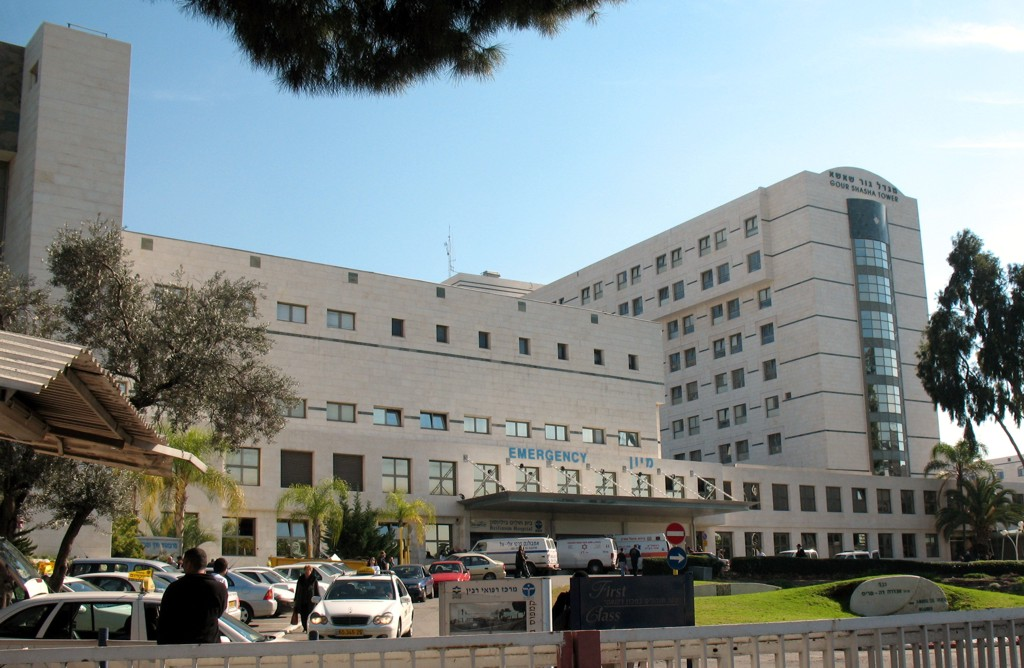
Rabin Medical Center in Petah Tikva, Israel

Israel has universal health care and participation in a medical insurance plan is compulsory. All residents are entitled to basic health care as a fundamental right. The system is based on the National Health Insurance Law of 1995, which mandates all citizens resident in the country to join one of four official health insurance organizations, known as Kupat Holim (קופת חולים - "Patient Funds") which are run as not-for-profit organizations and are prohibited by law from denying any Israeli resident membership. Israelis can increase their medical coverage and improve their options by purchasing private health insurance. In a survey of 48 countries in 2013, Israel's health system was ranked fourth in the world in terms of efficiency, and in 2014 it ranked seventh out of 51. In 2020, Israel's health system was ranked third most efficient in the world. In 2015, Israel was ranked sixth-healthiest country in the world by Bloomberg rankings and as of 2024 had a life expectancy of 81.7 for men and 85.7 for women.

According to a 2025 study published in the Israel Journal of Health Policy Research, Arab citizens of Israel constitute 25% of physicians, 27% of nurses, 27% of dentists and 49% of pharmacists.

== History ==
=== Ottoman era ===
During Ottoman rule, health care in the region of Palestine, Eretz Yisrael, was poor and underdeveloped until the 19th century. Healthcare was largely provided by traditional healers, amateur druggists, and experts in medicinal herbs. Modern medical institutions began to be established in the 19th century. Three Jewish hospitals were founded in Jerusalem: Bikur Cholim (1826), Misgav Ladach (1854), and Ezrat Nashim (1895). Christian missionary organizations also set up medical facilities. The British consulate in Jerusalem established a clinic providing free medical care in 1838, which was turned into a hospital run by a missionary organization in 1844. The communal leadership of the Haredi Jewish community was opposed to the establishment of Jewish medical institutions until the mid-19th century, fearing that the influence of Jewish doctors trained in secular universities would disrupt the religious life of the Jewish community of Ottoman Palestine. After the establishment of the missionary hospital in Jerusalem, the Haredi communal leadership dropped its objections to Jewish medical institutions, as the influence of missionaries was seen as a greater threat than that of Jewish doctors trained in secular institutions.

In 1872, Max Sandreczky, a German Christian physician, settled in Jerusalem and opened the first children's hospital in the country, Marienstift, which admitted children of all faiths. In 1891, a Jewish hospital was opened in Jaffa. Scores of clinics managed by Jewish doctors were also opened. In the late nineteenth century, as the Yishuv, or pre-state Jewish community, began to grow in the wake of the First Aliyah, medical systems were set up in the emerging Jewish agricultural settlements, or moshavot. Financially backed by Baron Edmond de Rothschild, the settlers hired physicians and medical assistants. A sick room was built in Rishon LeZion and a fourteen-bed hospital was established in Zikhron Ya'akov. Towards the end of the 19th century and into the early 20th century, the medical system in the moshavot was expanded, initially under Baron Rothschild and then under the auspices of the Jewish Colonization Association. Nurses and midwives were hired and apothecaries run by trained pharmacists were established. Primary care was provided in the moshavot with serious cases referred to the hospitals and in some cases abroad for treatment. In 1902, another Jewish hospital in Jerusalem, Shaare Zedek, was opened in central Jerusalem.

The expanding medical system of the moshavot was designed primarily for the residents of those settlements. Jews who worked as ordinary laborers and were not members of a moshava were consequently forced to pay for medical care or rely on the benevolence of doctors to treat them. In large moshavot such as Rishon LeZion, Petah Tikva, and Rehovot, partial medical assistance was extended to Jewish laborers, but this sometimes relied on the goodwill of the baron's clerks, and in Petah Tikva a clause in the local charter stipulated that a non-resident in need of medical assistance must pay. In the Jewish agricultural training farms at Ben Shemen and Hulda, established by the Jewish Colonization Association to train laborers, insufficient medical care was one of the most common causes of conflict between the workers and foremen. In 1911, the Judea Worker's Health Fund, which later evolved into Clalit Health Services, was established to cover Jewish laborers and their wives, becoming the first Zionist health insurance fund in the country. It began operations in 1913. Jewish laborers in the Galilee and Samaria subsequently established their own sick funds in 1912, which began operations in 1916 and 1917 respectively.

During World War I, the Ottoman authorities closed the Jewish hospitals in Jerusalem and Jaffa. The Ottoman Army seized the medical equipment and drafted most of the doctors. With the war's end and the British conquest of Palestine, the Yishuv was left without an effective hospital system. In 1918, the Hadassah Women's Zionist Organization of America established the American Zionist Medical Unit (AZMU) to rebuild the Yishuv's medical system. With assistance from the AZMU and foreign contributions, the Jewish hospitals were reopened, and a new one was established in Jaffa. In 1919, hospitals were opened in Safed and Tiberias, and a hospital was opened in Haifa in 1922. The AZMU was turned into the Hadassah Medical Federation, which oversaw the Yishuv's health system.

=== British Mandate ===
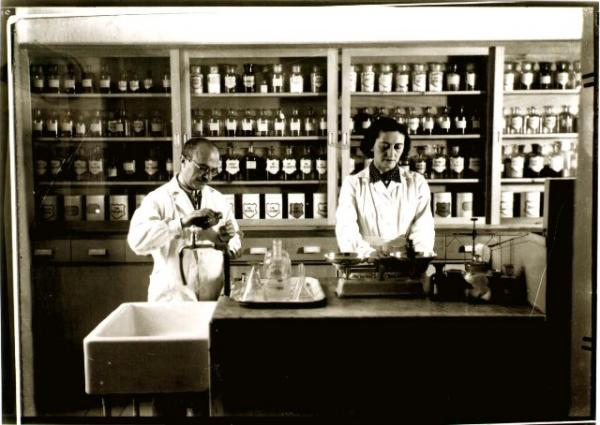
Pharmacy in Petah Tikva, 1930s

With the start of British rule, measures were taken to improve public health in the area. They began during British military rule, and continued to grow with the establishment of the British Mandate in 1922. In Jerusalem, accumulated refuse heaps were removed, public rubbish bins were installed; the entire population was vaccinated against smallpox, and pools and cisterns were covered with mosquito repellent as part of the campaign to eradicate malaria. Family health centers known as Tipat Halav (from Hebrew: a drop of milk) were founded for the care of newborns, child development and vaccinations. In 1929, the Zionist Commission and the British authorities sent the Jewish epidemiologist Gideon Mer to Rosh Pinna to establish a laboratory for malaria research. Mer's laboratory was instrumental in eradicating the disease. The campaign against malaria was headed by Hadassah until 1927. In 1927, the Malaria Research Station was opened in Rosh Pinna. The Mandate administration founded a Health Department that operated its own hospitals, clinics, and laboratories. The Health Department primarily cared for British personnel stationed in Mandatory Palestine and provided health services to the Arab population. Little was invested in healthcare for the Jewish population, as it was assumed that the Yishuv was capable of managing its own healthcare system.

With the expansion of the Yishuv through the Third and Fourth Aliyah, new Jewish medical facilities were established and the number of Hadassah hospital beds tripled. New Jewish health insurance funds were also formed. The other major provider of healthcare aside from Hadassah was the Histadrut labor federation, which established its own sick fund, Kupat Holim Clalit, and by 1946 operated two hospitals and hundreds of clinics and health centers. In addition, some private medical centers and health funds were also established.

The Yishuv's health insurance and medical services organizations, known as Kupat Holim (pl. Kupot Holim) were modeled after the medical mutual-aid societies that were formed in Germany following Otto von Bismarck's social legislation of the late 19th century. The term Kupat Holim is a literal Hebrew translation of the German word Krankenkasse, and the health funds were originally based on this model. Although they have undergone significant reform since, to this day they are an integral part of Israel's universal healthcare system (as they are in present-day German-speaking countries).

=== State of Israel ===
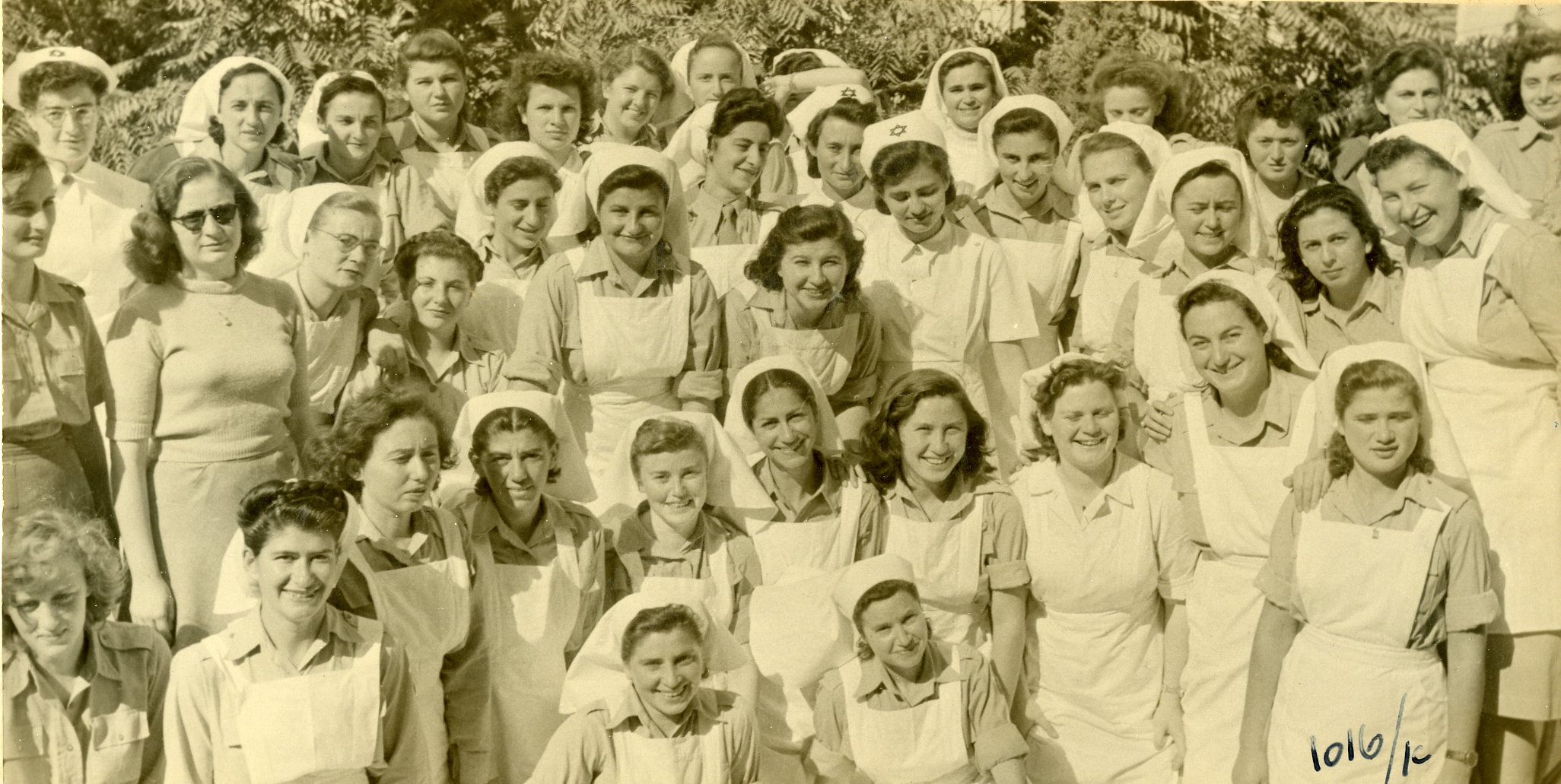
Hadassah nursing students, 1948

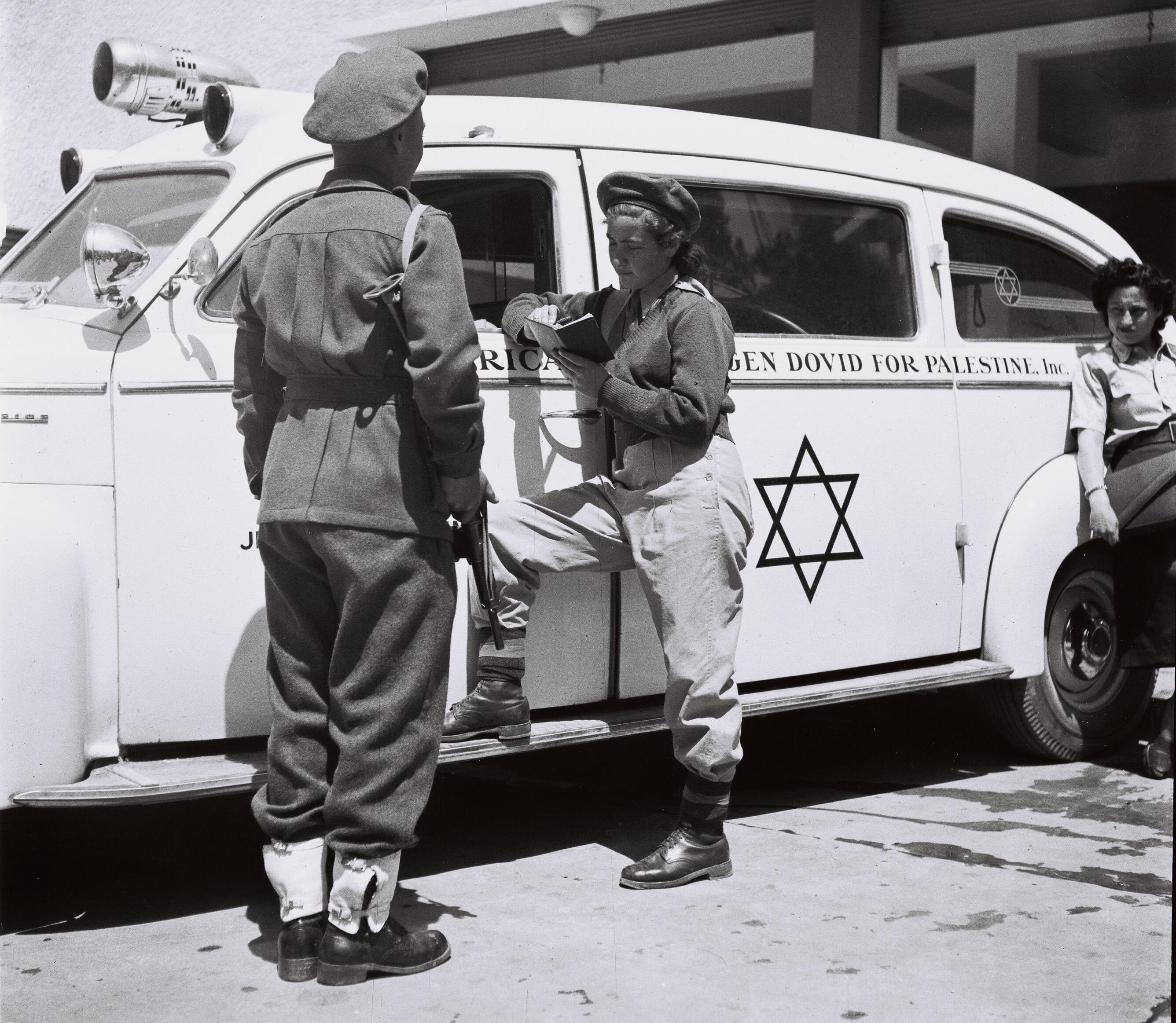
Magen David Adom ambulance, 1948

The Yishuv's health system formed the basis of the Israeli healthcare system with the establishment of the State of Israel in 1948. The Israeli government replaced the British Mandate's health department with a Ministry of Health, and established regional health bureaus and an epidemiological service. Hospital facilities formerly run by the British authorities were taken over by the state, and new hospitals and clinics were established. At the end of 1948, 53% of Israel's Jewish population was insured, about 80% of them by Clalit, with a few small health funds insuring the remainder. In the following years, Israel's healthcare system was expanded, and within a decade, about 90% were insured. By the 1970s, about 85% of the Israeli population belonged to sick funds, while a segment of the population paid for their own care and others received services for free, with the Ministry of Social Welfare covering the costs for poor uninsured persons. According to a 1976 study, the Ministry of Health provided “comprehensive health services to the medically indigent and to immigrants and their families who are not members of Kupat Holim.” According to a 1994 study, "Israel maintains a comprehensive health sector that is practically a universal coverage system, without being formally defined as such."

Until the enactment of the National Health Insurance Law in 1995, the Israeli healthcare system was based on voluntary membership of Israeli citizens in one of the sick funds, or Kupot Holim, which were responsible for providing medical care to their members. There were initially six sick funds, although the number was reduced to four in the 1970s after two distinct mergers of the existing health funds. The sick funds operated independently but were subsidized by the government. The largest one was Clalit Health Services, which was owned by the Histadrut labor federation. In the mid-1980s it was estimated that about 70% of the population was insured by Clalit. There were a number of government-owned hospitals; in 1987 the government ran 11 general hospitals, 10 psychiatric hospitals, and 8 geriatric hospitals. Clalit owned several hospitals and ran clinics in virtually every city, town, village, and kibbutz. There were other organizations which maintained some of their own medical facilities and funded the hospitalization of their clients in government hospitals. For health insurance, people had to pay premiums which varied according to income. Finally, there were some private doctors and very few private hospitals, and some highly expensive health plans covered private healthcare. The level of health coverage provided varied among the sick funds. Furthermore, Clalit was the only one not to restrict entry to new members based on age, pre-existing conditions, or other factors, although membership in the Histadrut labor union or being a dependent of a member was a pre-condition for membership with Clalit. This meant that people who did not (or could not) have such an affiliation with the Histadrut and were unable to join another sick fund lacked health insurance coverage. Nevertheless, by the early 1990s approximately 95% of the population was insured by the four funds.

In 1973, a law was enacted which legally obligated all employers to participate in the medical insurance of their employees by means of a direct payment to their employees' insurance plans. The duty of participation was modified in 1991.

In 1988, the government appointed a National Commission of Inquiry to examine the effectiveness and efficiency of the Israeli healthcare system, headed by Shoshana Netanyahu. The commission handed in the final report in 1990. The main recommendation of this report was to enact a National Health Insurance law which would streamline the management, delivery and public financing of medical services in the country and guarantee a minimum health coverage level to all citizens. The recommendation was promoted by Health Minister Haim Ramon and the National Health Insurance Law was passed by the Knesset in 1994 and came into effect on January 1, 1995. After enactment of the 1995 law, membership in one of the four Kupot Holim became mandatory while acceptance into any of them was legally guaranteed, Clalit's linkage with the Histadrut was severed, and Israeli residents became entitled to the same minimum basic basket of services regardless of which fund they belonged to, and were permitted to switch between funds once a year.

== Health insurance framework ==
=== National Health Insurance Law ===
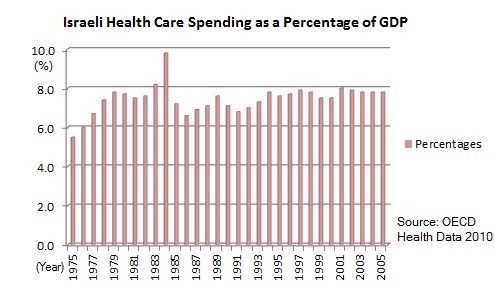
Health care spending in Israel as a percentage of GDP

Under the National Health Insurance Law, membership in one of the four following health funds, or Kupot Holim (Patient Funds) is compulsory for all residents of Israel: Clalit, Maccabi, Meuhedet and Leumit. Clalit is the largest of the four. As of 2024, just over half of the population (50.96%) belonging to Clalit, followed by Maccabi (27.48%), Meuhedet (13.99%) and Leumit (7.57%). The four Kupot Holim are obligated by the law to offer a minimum package of health services and treatments, known as the Health Basket (סל הבריאות; Sal HaBriut ), to all their members. The law established a system of direct oversight of the Kupot Holim by the state, and certain services are under the direct administration of the State, usually by means of the Ministry of Health. The health funds cannot reject any applicant for any reason, including age or preexisting conditions.

The Health Basket covers all costs of medical diagnosis and treatment in the areas of family medicine, hospitalization (general, maternity, psychiatric and chronic), preventive medicine, surgery (including elective surgery), transplants, treatment for drug abuse and alcoholism, medical equipment and appliances, first aid and transportation to a medical facility, obstetrics and fertility treatment, medications approved under the National Health Basket (which is updated every year), treatment of chronic diseases and paramedical services such as physiotherapy and occupational therapy, and mental healthcare. Medications for serious illnesses that are part of the official "basket of medications" formulary (which is large and updated regularly, but does not include all medications) are covered, though patients must partially pay for these medications with copays: medications included in the basket are covered at rates that vary from 50% to 90%. IVF treatments for the first two children up to the age of 45 and in certain cases abortions are also covered.

A committee appointed by the health ministry reviews the contents of the health basket on a yearly basis and determines which new treatments will be added to it within the constraints of the annual budget allocated to the basket by the government.

In general, each Kupat Holim allows members to choose a primary care physician and specialists from a list of healthcare providers associated with the fund.

While the Kupot Holim typically cover medical treatment in Israel, they can fund medical procedures abroad when the procedure in question cannot be obtained in Israel. There is a cap of $250,000 without copay to fund treatment abroad, though that limit can be waived by the Director-General of the Health Ministry.

Members of each Kupat Holim can switch to another once a year. There are six specified dates on which people can transfer, depending on when they signed up for their previous one. In special circumstances, it is possible to petition the Ministry of Health to cancel a change or register earlier than an official date.

The National Health Insurance Law sets out a system of public funding for health services by means of a progressive health tax, administered by Bituah Leumi, or the National Insurance Institute, Israel's social security organization, which transfers funding to the Kupot Holim according to a capitation formula based on the number of members in each fund, the age distribution of members, and a number of other indices. The Kupot Holim also receive some direct government funding. The government provides the Kupot Holim relatively wide discretion in determining how to spend their public funding, with the condition that the Kupot Holim must guarantee providing the treatments set forth in the health basket as a minimum service to their members.

For the health tax, wage-earners and the self-employed must pay 3.1% of their monthly salary up to 60% of the average prevailing market wage (appx. NIS 6,300 in 2020), and 5% of anything earned above it. Employers are legally obligated to deduct insurance contributions from their employees' salaries, while the self-employed must arrange payment on their own. Pensioners have contributions deducted from their pensions, as do those receiving unemployment benefits. Only a select few categories of people are exempt from paying health premiums. Dependent minors are exempt. Housewives who do not work are exempt unless they receive a pension or their spouse receives an increment to a pension. Those receiving old-age pension benefits from Bituah Leumi (i.e., most of the elderly people in Israel) pay a reduced flat rate and any additional income they have is exempted from the health tax. In addition, people who immigrate to Israel under the Law of Return, and Israeli citizens who were born abroad or left as minors, and who settle in Israel are entitled to one year of free health insurance if they are not working, subject to some exceptions.

While the vast majority of public health services are covered by the Kupot Holim under the National Health Insurance Law, pre-natal, post-natal, and geriatric care services are run directly by the Ministry of Health.

Government spending on healthcare is about 60% of the total, considerably below the average for OECD countries of 72%.

Although most residents are covered under the National Health Insurance Law, some exceptions apply to people who receive state-funded healthcare through other means. All soldiers except those who were found medically unfit for service but volunteered are not covered by their Kupat Holim during their military service, but receive healthcare through the military healthcare system. Upon leaving the military, soldiers rejoin their previous Kupat Holim. Disabled veterans are covered by the Ministry of Defense. In addition, some disabled World War II veterans and victims of the Nazis are eligible for certain types of health benefits from the Ministry of Finance. New immigrants who have not yet registered with a Kupat Holim and are in immediate need of healthcare can apply for coverage from the Public Ombudsman of the Ministry of Health.

==== Rights under the National Health Insurance Law ====
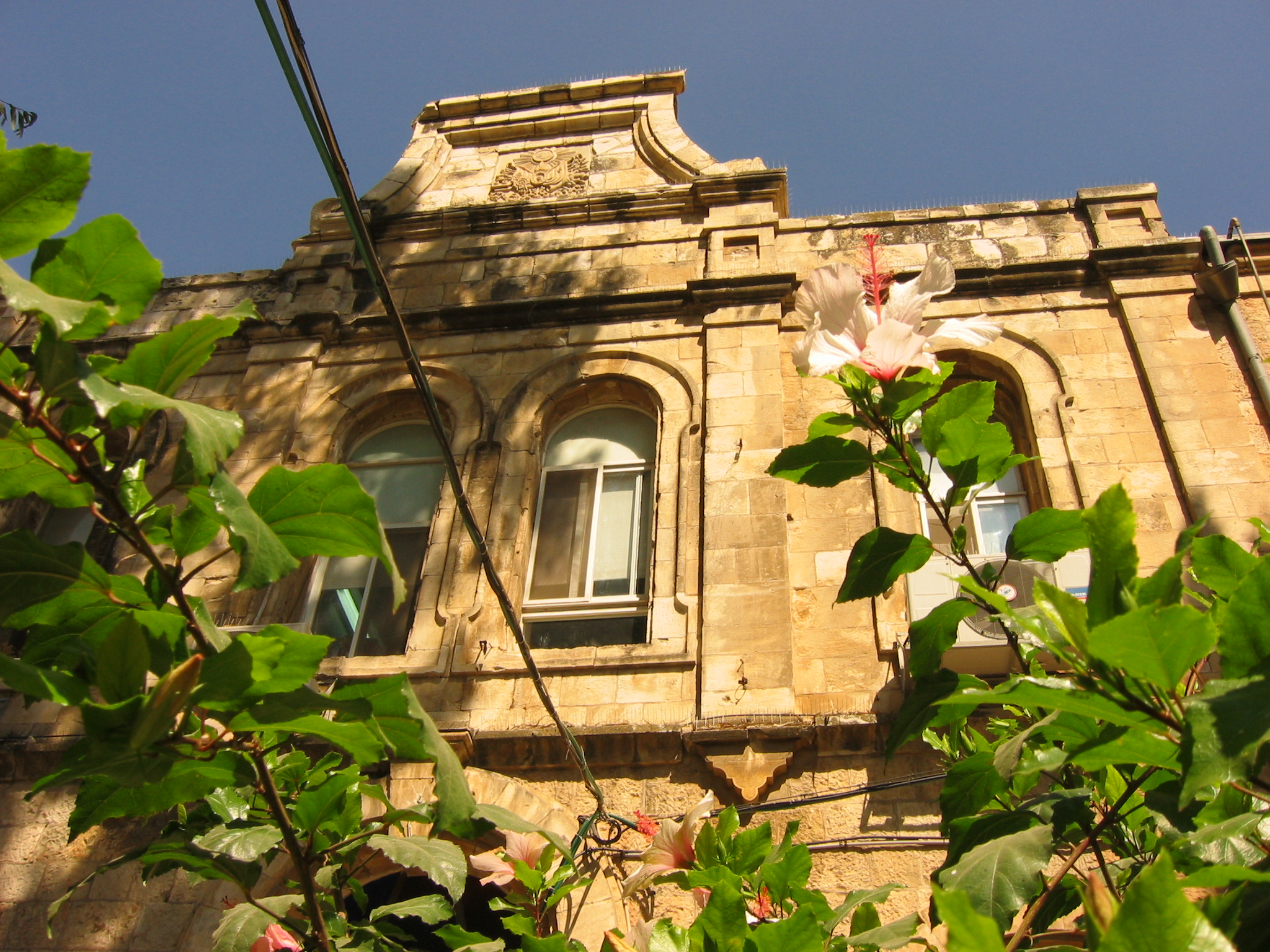
Ministry of Health building on Jaffa Road, Jerusalem

- Every Israeli citizen is entitled to health care services under the National Health Insurance Law.
- Every resident has a right to register as a member of a Kupat Holim of his/her choice, free of any preconditions or limitations stemming from his/her age or the state of his/her health.
- Every resident has a right to receive, via the Kupat Holim of which she or he is a member, all of the services included in the medical services basket, subject to medical discretion, and at a reasonable quality level, within a reasonable period of time and at a reasonable distance from his/her home.
- Each member has a right to receive the health services while preserving the member's dignity, privacy and medical confidentiality.
- Every Israeli resident has the right to transfer from one Kupat Holim to another.
- Each member has a right to select the service providers, such as doctors, caregivers, therapists, hospitals and institutes, from within a list of service providers who have entered into an agreement with the Kupat Holim to which the member belongs, and within the arrangements in place for the selection of the service providers, and which the Kupat Holim publishes from time to time.
- Each member has a right to know which hospitals and institutes, and other service providers have service agreements with the Kupat Holim, and what are the provider selection processes at the Kupat Holim.
- Each member has a right to see and to receive a copy of the Kupat Holim regulations.
- Each resident has a right to receive from the Kupat Holim complete information concerning the payment arrangements in place with the Kupat Holim for health services as well as the Kupat Holim's Supplementary Insurance plans.
- Each member has a right to complain with the Public Inquiries commissioner at the medical institute that treated the member, to the person in charge of investigating member complaints at the Kupat Holim of which s/he is a member, or to the complaints commissioner for the national health insurance law in the Ministry of Health.
- Each member has a right to file suit at the district labor court.

=== Supplemental coverage and private insurance ===
Israeli residents may supplement their health insurance coverage beyond what is provided by the publicly funded basket of services in two main ways: Supplemental insurance offered by the health funds, and private health insurance coverage provided by commercial insurance companies.

==== Supplemental coverage ====
The four health funds offer their members the option of purchasing supplemental insurance plans which provide coverage for services not included in the basket of services or provide coverage at an increased level. Each health fund offers two coverage tiers of supplemental coverage and include or provide discounts on services and products such as: second opinions from medical specialists, surgeries and other medical procedures by private physicians and in private or semi-private facilities in Israel and abroad, dental and orthodontic coverage for adults, discounts on drugs not included in the public "basket of medications", expanded maternity care, additional vaccinations and medical tests, alternative medicine, and more. The price of these supplemental plans is relatively modest (costing an equivalent of US$10 to $40 per month for an adult depending on age group and coverage tier in 2019). The health funds are prohibited by law from denying any member participation in a supplementary health insurance plan, and may not charge different premiums due to pre-existing conditions, although they typically impose an initial waiting period before supplemental coverage takes effect (which may be waived if the member transferred from another fund and was already covered under the former fund's supplemental plan).

Supplemental plans are heavily promoted by the health funds and as of 2017 more than three quarters of all Israelis subscribe to them. They are a way for funds to distinguish their service offerings from other funds since although the uniform health basket only mandates the funds' minimum offering to all fund members, any additional services beyond those mandated by the basket are usually bundled by the funds into their supplemental plans. As such, much of the four health funds' advertising efforts center around promoting their supplemental plans.

==== Private insurance coverage ====
There are private health insurance plans which citizens may participate in addition to the compulsory participation in one of four national health funds. All major Israeli commercial insurance companies offer health insurance plans. They may be purchased directly from an insurance company as a private policy or under a group policy if offered as a benefit by an employer. These plans provide coverage for additional options for treatments beyond what is provided by the public health basket. For example, in the area of elective surgery, a participant in a private insurance plan may choose the surgeon, anesthetist, and hospital anywhere in Israel or around the world. In the area of transplants, unlimited funding is available to ensure a donor is found and the procedure is done without the need for government approval. Additional coverage may be provided for specific diseases such as cancer. In the area of medications for serious illnesses, private insurance companies give access to a wider range of than the official "basket of medications", as the Israeli government is not financially capable of covering all medications. In comparison with health insurance in other countries, private health insurance plans in Israel are considered comparatively inexpensive, but premiums are based on age, gender, and unlike the supplemental coverage offered by the health funds, are subject to medical underwriting, that is they also depend on pre-existing conditions and previous medical history.

As of 2017, approximately one third of Israelis purchase some level of private health insurance coverage. Frequently this coverage at least partially overlaps with the supplemental coverage offered by the health funds, meaning that some subscribers pay twice for the same coverage (and which is usually less expensive when obtained through the health funds' supplemental plans). This has prompted calls for the Israeli insurance commissioner to impose tighter regulations on the private health insurance marketplace. Some insurance companies offer private health insurance coverage specifically designed to supplement the supplemental plans offered by the health funds to avoid the double-coverage situation.

== Healthcare providers and facilities ==
Providers in the Israeli healthcare system consist of a mixture of private, semi-private and public entities. Generally, family and primary medicine facilities are run directly by Kupot Holim in their own practice clinics and by contract with privately operated clinics in smaller communities. As with primary practice, Kupot Holim tend to provide specialty and outpatient care in their own clinics. In addition to these, the ministry of health in conjunction with various local authorities also runs a network of public well care and prenatal and infant care clinics (tipat halav) throughout the country.

=== Private healthcare facilities ===
There are private hospitals and clinics throughout the country. Although the healthcare in public and private hospitals is equivalent in quality, private hospitals offer superior patient care and amenities to public hospitals, such as private rooms designed as hotel rooms, Internet and television access, restaurant-quality food, and extra beds for visitors to stay overnight.

== Safety and quality ==
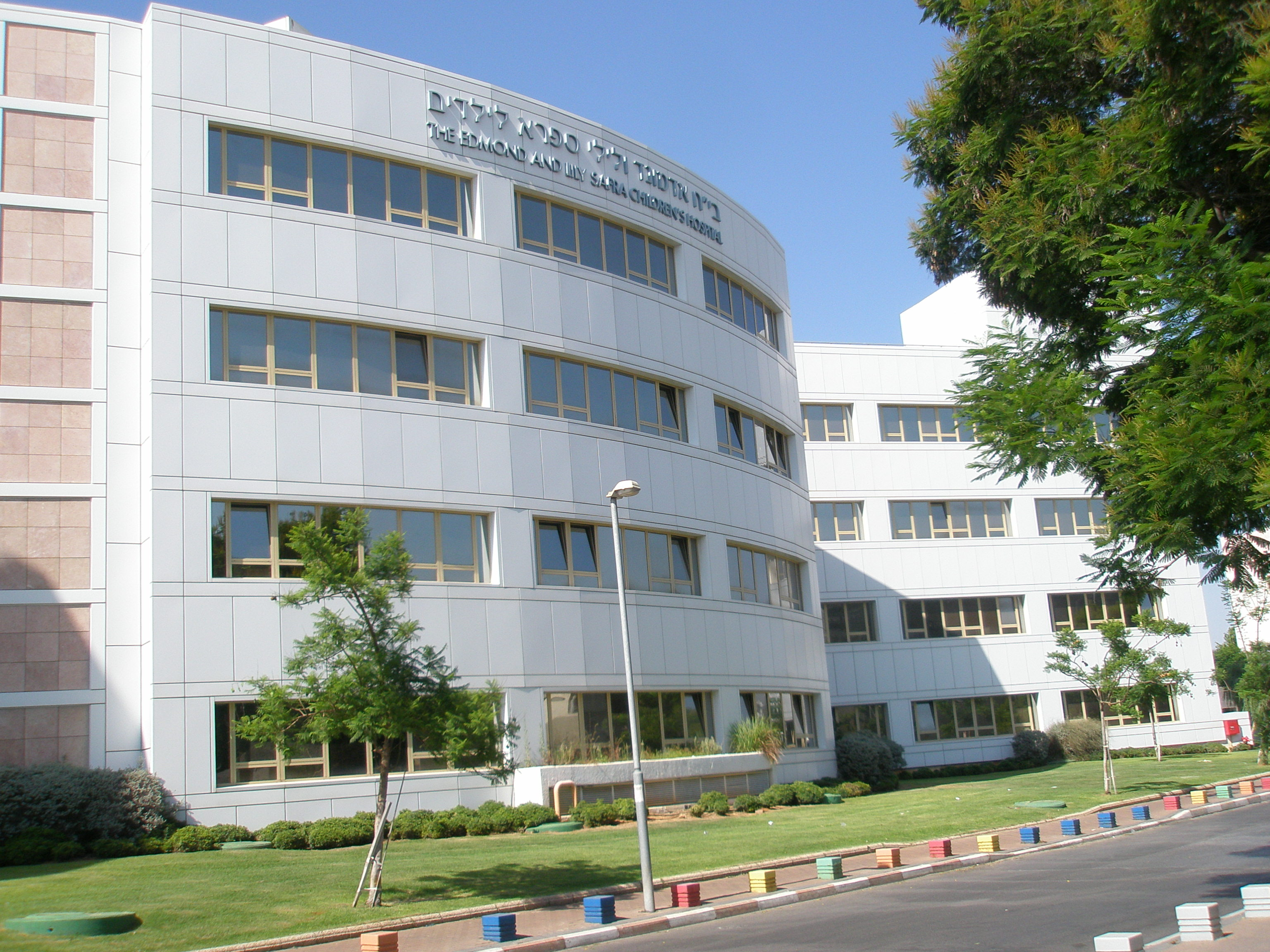
Safra Children's Hospital at Tel HaShomer

Israel is seen as having a technologically advanced healthcare system. In 2025, Israel was ranked 10th globally for health care services. Medical personnel are well-trained.

Seven Israeli hospitals have received accreditation from the Joint Commission, an organization that sets safety standards for medical care: Soroka Medical Center in Beersheba, HaEmek Medical Center in Afula, Meir Hospital in Kfar Saba, Rabin Medical Center in Petah Tikva, Kaplan Medical Center in Rehovot, Carmel Medical Center in Haifa and Assuta Medical Center in Tel Aviv.

In 2025, Newsweek ranked Sheba Medical Center as the 8th-best hospital in the world, scoring the highest for an Asian or Israeli hospital.

== Physicians ==
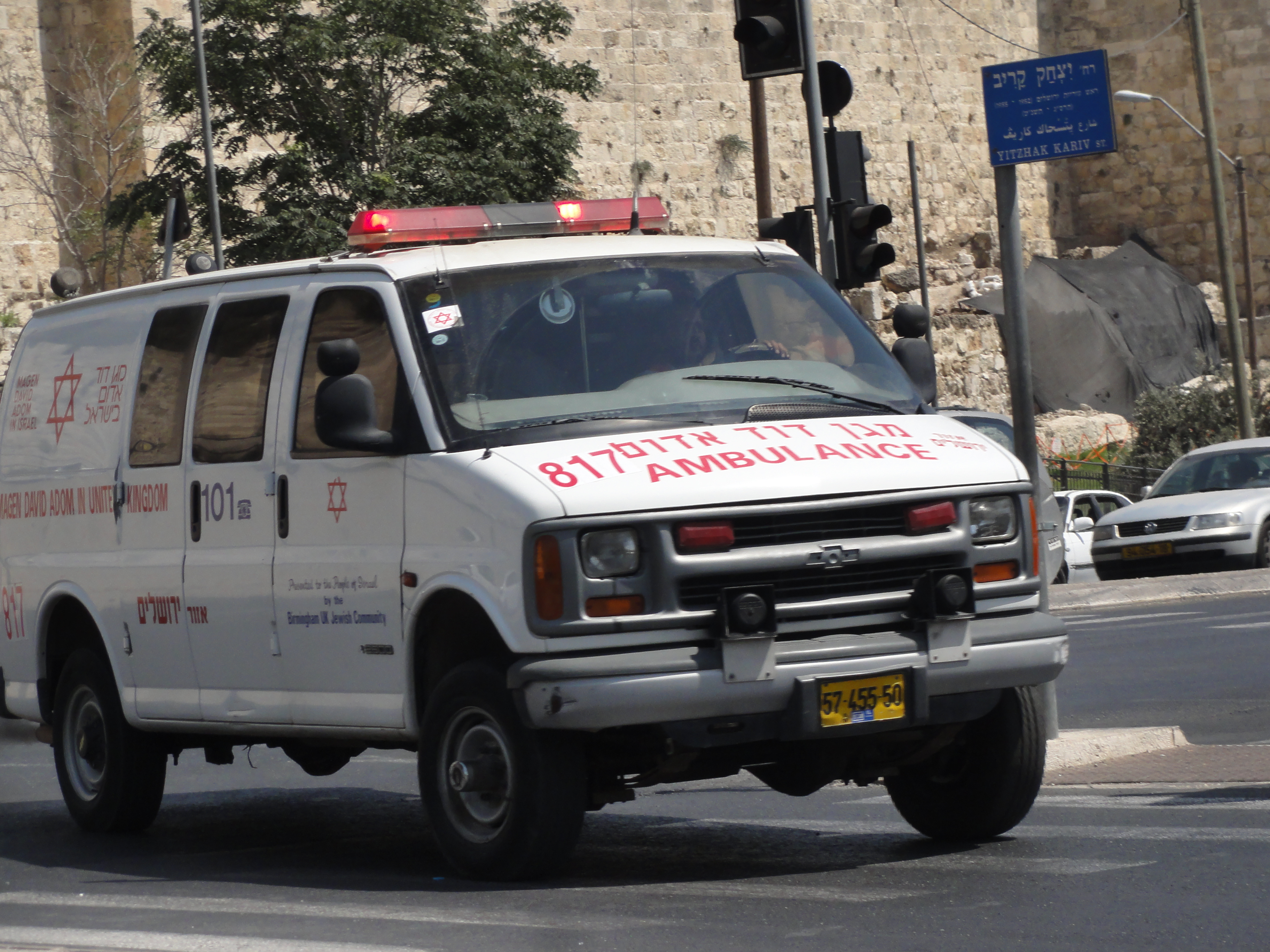
Typical Magen David Adom ambulance

As of 2013, there were 3.1 professionally active physicians per 1000 population in Israel, which is a higher ratio than the U.S. and Japan. As of the end of 2014, there were 34,231 registered physicians in Israel, 25,637 under the age of 65, 30,683 under the age of 75. There are over 10,000 more physicians in Israel who are licensed but not practicing (working in other fields, retired). About forty percent of Israeli physicians are women. Between 2000 and 2009 the OECD reports no growth in the physician per capita ratio in Israel compared to a global average of 1.7% growth in developed countries. There are also severe physician shortages in specific specialties, such as anesthesia, general surgery, geriatrics, and primary care

Israel has six university medical schools which typically follow the European 6-year training model. However, the medical school at Bar-Ilan University follows a four-year program similar to the American system. Tel Aviv University also offers a four-year program similar to the American system for students who hold a bachelor's degree in certain biological sciences. The entrance requirements for the various schools of medicine are strict due to the large pool of applicants and limited number of spots.

In 2008, only 35% of doctors in Israel were born there, and almost 50% were immigrants, especially from Argentina and Eastern Europe, particularly the former Soviet Union. In addition, many Israelis study medicine abroad, with Israeli medical students particularly popular with European universities. To practice in Israel, doctors trained abroad must pass a licensing examination to ensure that their medical training is up to Israeli standards. As of 2025, the requirements of immigrant doctors were relaxed, allowing 10 years of experience from most countries, and much less for doctors from the US, Canada, South Africa, Australia, New Zealand, the UK, and France.

In the late 2000s, a future shortage of doctors and nurses became a concern, as the rate of doctors graduating from Israel's medical schools annually had dropped to 300, 200 less than needed, and many Soviet immigrant doctors and nurses began to retire. That number was estimated to eventually rise to 520 with the opening of a fifth medical school, but still below the 900 graduates that will be needed in 2022. This caused concerns of a shortage of medical personnel, which would imperil the quality and speed of medical care in the country. As a result, Israel began offering incentives to Jewish doctors to emigrate from abroad and practice medicine in Israel. Initially, only about 100 doctors from the former Soviet Union immigrated under this program every year, but the program is now attracting doctors from North America and Western Europe. An investigative committee looking into the issue also called for incentives to be offered to Israeli medical students who had not been accepted in Israel and had gone to study medicine abroad to return to Israel, and for a program that involves 150 international students studying medicine in Israel to be shut down. In addition, the Israeli Health Ministry announced the launching of a new nursing assistants' profession, and increased nursing education programs in colleges. Israel has also begun a program under which doctors from Eastern Europe work in Israel in fields such as pediatrics and internal medicine.

== Nurses ==
As of 2011, there were 37,300 actively practicing nurses in Israel or 4.81 nurses per 1000 population compared to OECD country average of 8.7 nurses per 1000 population, ranking Israel one of the lowest nursing ratio countries in the developed world, after Greece, Mexico, and Turkey. This represents a 14% decrease in Israeli nursing per capita from 2001. Nursing education is similar to that of other developed countries. There are many Registered Nurse programs, Bachelor of nursing academic programs, and several graduate schools for advanced degrees. A Bachelor's degree is a prerequisite for advanced certifications and clinical courses. Licensed practical nurse programs ended, yet were recently re-approved as a solution to the nursing shortage in Israel. Nurse practitioners were legalized in Israel in November 2013, and foreign-trained nurse practitioners can transfer their license to work in Israel. All NP courses to date have been provided by the Ministry of Health, and are post-Masters certificate courses several months in length. Compared to Western country standards and the International Council of Nursing, Israeli nurse practitioners have relatively limited scopes of practice and independence.

== Physician assistants ==
One of the well-established solutions to the growing shortage of medical personnel that is experienced also in Israel is the development of mid-level practitioners, e.g., nurse practitioners and physician assistants. The development of Physician Assistants in Israel was in a constant debate for years until a committee appointed by the Ministry of Health Director General recommended on 2013 on the development of an Israeli version of Physician Assistants in five areas that are currently in great need: Internal Medicine, Surgery, Anesthesiology, Emergency Medicine and Pathology. Because of legislative reasons, and in order to implement fast, the Ministry of Health decided not to create a new general profession like in the US but to expand the capabilities and authorities of existing medical professions thus creating new 'roles' for these professions as Physician Assistants. The first course of Emergency Medicine Physician Assistants started on May 15, 2016, comprising about 35 participants, most of them academic paramedic with substantial experience and very few MDs from international universities (outside Israel) that failed to pass the Israeli government examination so are not licensed to practice medicine in Israel.

== Emergency services ==
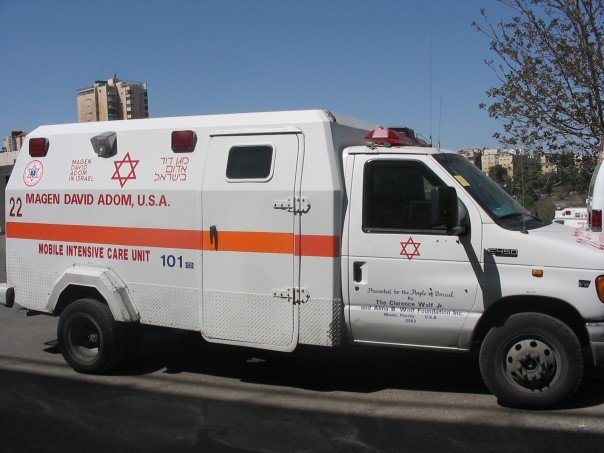
Magen David Adom armored mobile intensive care unit

Emergency medical services in Israel are provided by the Magen David Adom (MDA) organization, which staffs approximately 1,200 emergency medical technicians, paramedics, and emergency physicians. The number of volunteers is between 26,000 and 39,200. The organizations operates 119 stations and a fleet of over 700 ambulances. The majority of the fleet consists of basic life support ambulances. There are also smaller numbers of advanced life support ambulances and mobile intensive care units. For air ambulance services, MDA partners with Hatzolah Air. There were also four MBB Bo 105 utility helicopters staffed with MDA paramedics owned by Lahak Aviation operating as air ambulances throughout the country; these have been replaced with BK117 helicopters. Non-emergency and repatriation air ambulance services are normally provided by private charter carriers.

Magen David Adom is supplemented in some areas by Hatzalah, an emergency ambulance services network serving Jewish communities worldwide, and ZAKA, a series of community emergency response teams staffed by Orthodox Jews, who in addition to providing medical services and evacuation, also aid in the identification of terrorism victims and gather spilled blood and body parts for burial. The Palestine Red Crescent Society also provides services to Arab neighborhoods in Jerusalem. It gained access to Jerusalem after signing a 2005 Memorandum of Understanding with Magen David Adom.

The ambulance system originally conformed to the Franco-German model of EMS care, but shifted to the Anglo-American Model, with rapid, paramedic-led on-scene stabilization, after which the patient is transported to the hospital. In addition, emergency ambulance services is bolstered by a variety of private carriers tasked with interfacility transfers only.

== Medical tourism ==
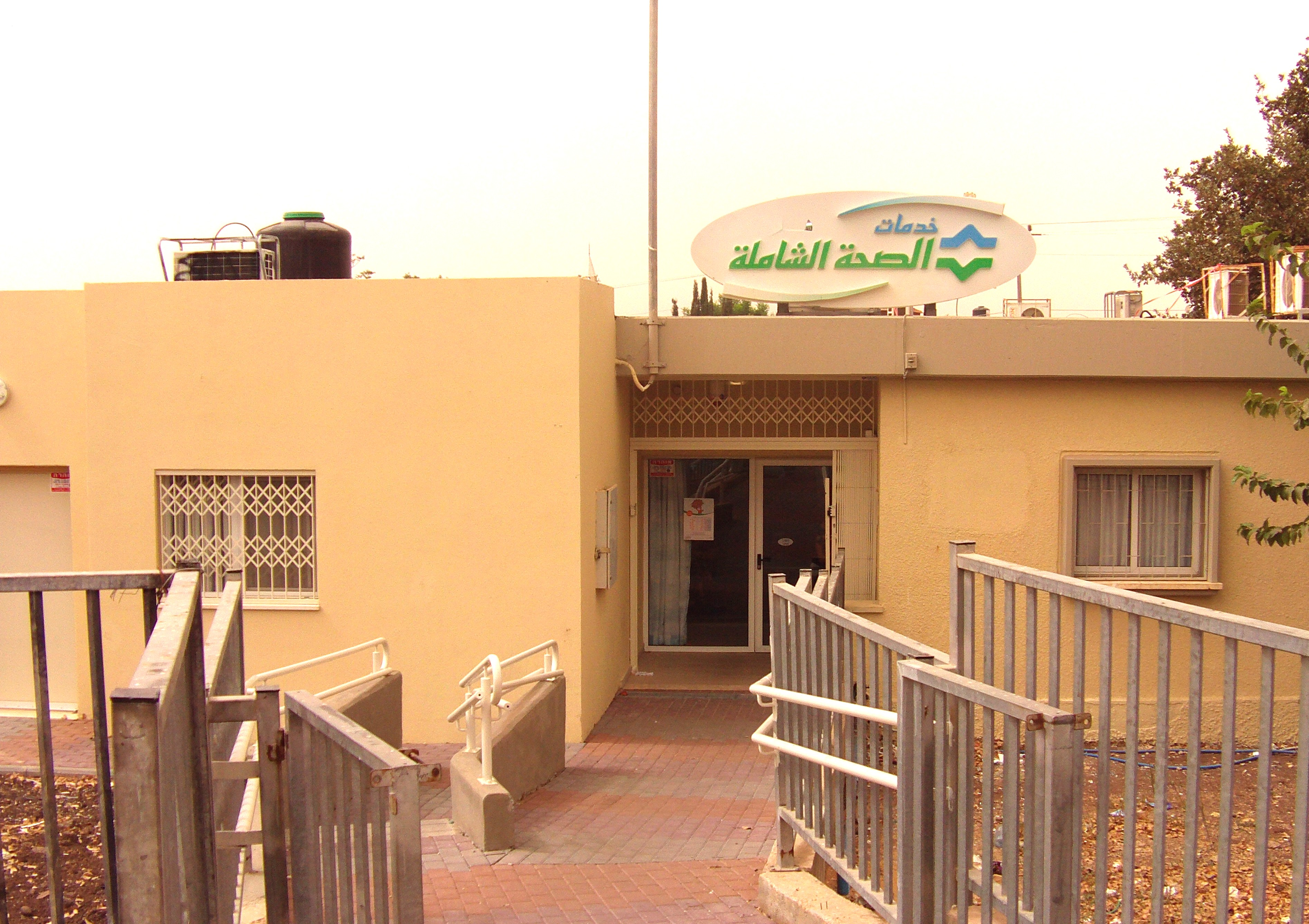
Clalit clinic in the Bedouin Arab village of Tuba-Zangariyye

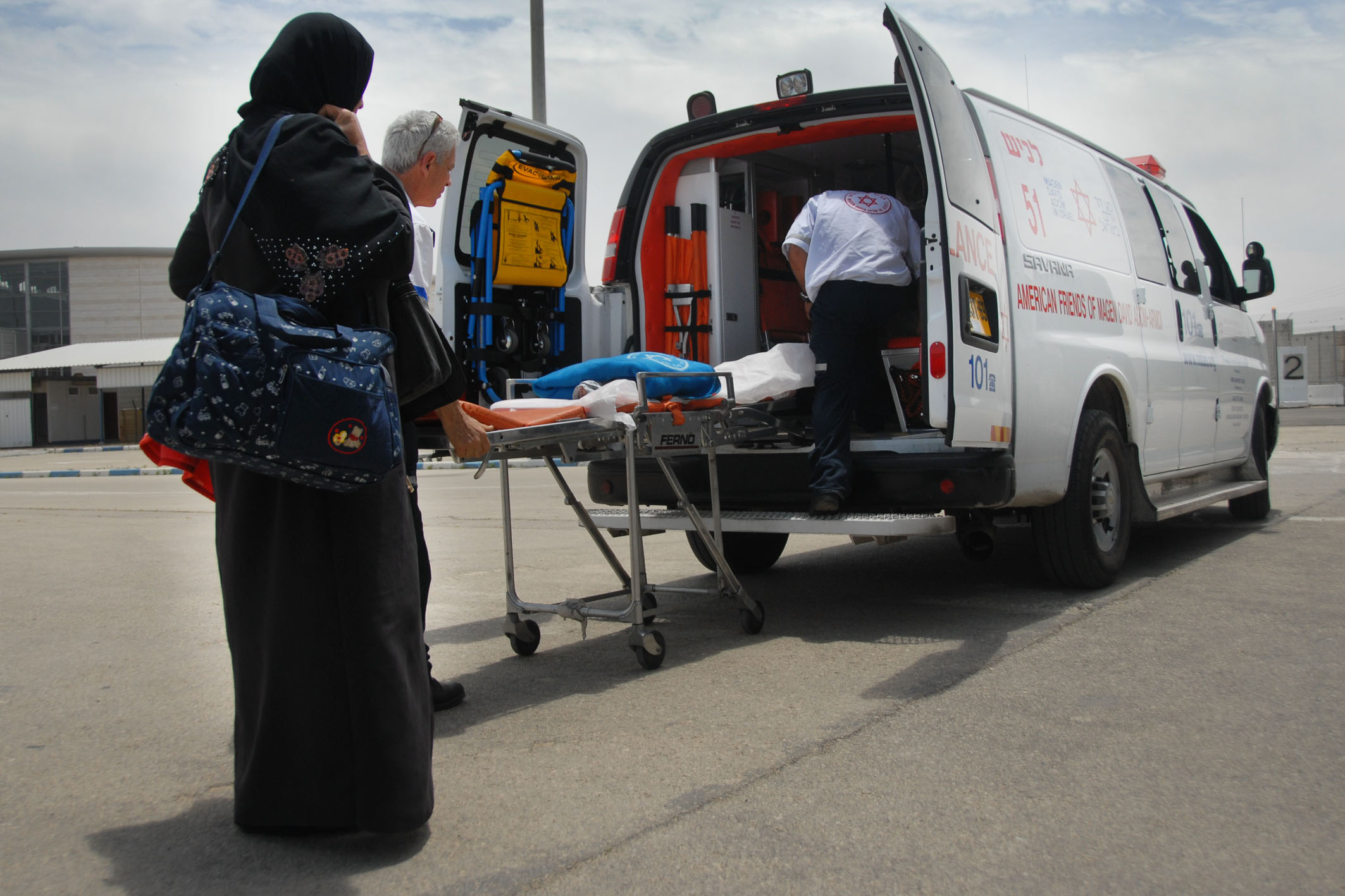
Gaza residents being transferred for medical treatment in Israel through Erez Crossing

Israel is emerging as a popular destination for medical tourists. In 2006, 15,000 foreigners travelled to the country for medical procedures, bringing in $40 million of revenue. As of 2010, up to 30,000 foreigners come to Israel every year for treatment, mostly from Russia.

Some medical tourists come to Israel because the procedures they seek are not available in their home countries. Others, particularly from the US, choose Israel because they can receive high quality treatment, such as surgery and in-vitro fertilization at much lower cost. Many medical tourists come to Israel for treatment at the Dead Sea, a world-famous therapeutic resort. The Israel Ministry of Tourism and professional medical services providers are working to promote awareness of this niche in Israel.

According to a report in 2013, the number of patients from Eastern Europe, Cyprus and the United States seeking treatment at Israel's public and private hospitals is growing. Income from medical tourism was assessed at about $140 million in 2012.

=== Palestinian medical tourism ===
A significant number of residents of the Palestinian territories seek medical treatment in Israel, often for sophisticated tests or treatments not available at Palestinian hospitals. Their treatment is paid for under a financial arrangement with the Palestinian Authority, or in some cases, at their own expense. Medical treatment for Gaza Strip residents is paid for by the Palestinian Authority or organizations such as the Peres Center for Peace.

Palestinians who apply for medical treatment in Israel must obtain a humanitarian entry permit from Israel, of which thousands are issued annually. In January 2009, during the Gaza War, the Palestinian Authority temporarily canceled financial coverage for all medical care for Palestinians in Israeli hospitals, including coverage for the chronically ill and those in need of complex care not available in the Palestinian territories. Palestinian officials stated that they wished to send the patients to neighboring Arab countries instead, accusing Israeli officials of using Palestinian patients, some injured in Israeli airstrikes, in PR campaigns to improve Israel's tarnished image during the Gaza War. In 2012, The Palestinian Authority's Ministry of Health reported spending approximately $42 million in 2011 to finance medical coverage of Palestinians in Israeli hospitals and the Arab World. Arab citizens of Israel belong to the same health care system as that of all other citizens of the country.

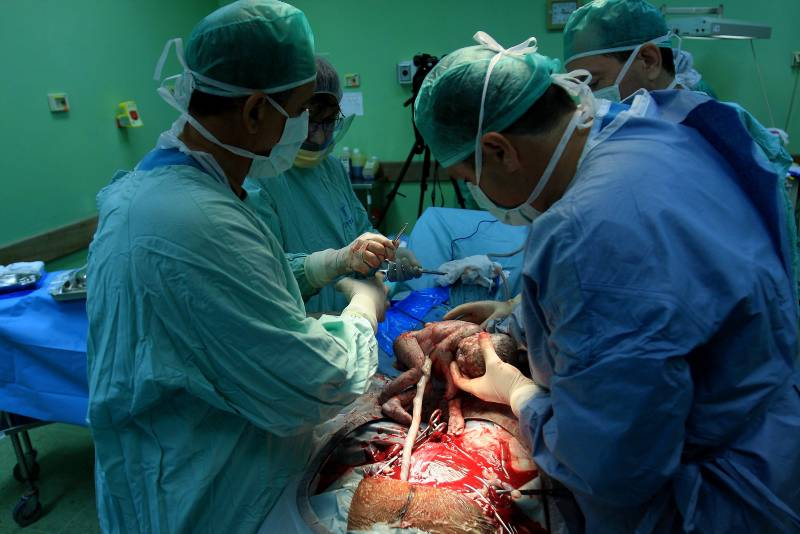
Gaza Strip resident giving birth to quadruplets at an Israeli hospital, 2008

The quality of medical care in Israel is significantly better than anywhere in the West Bank and Gaza. Irwin Mansdorf, a member of Task Force on Medical and Public Health Issues, Scholars for Peace in the Middle East wrote about routine care that Palestinians continue to receive in Israeli hospitals and from Israeli physicians.

Saving Children, established by the Peres Peace Center, enables hundreds of Palestinian children to receive free medical care, in particular cardiac surgery, from Israeli surgeons.

"Save a Child's Heart" is a program in which any child with heart problems can receive free medical attention and surgery from select doctors and hospitals within Israel. From 1996 to 2007, 4,591 children had been examined worldwide, of the 1848 children treated 828 (45%) were Palestinian.

=== Humanitarian aid ===
As of August 2013, Israeli hospitals have provided treatment to scores of Syrian citizens injured in the Syrian civil war. Since late March, some 100 Syrians have been treated at two hospitals in Galilee. The patients arrive by military ambulance and the hospital calls the army to transport them back when they are released. The Israeli military also operates a field hospital and mobile medical teams along the Syrian frontier.

=== Uninsured populations ===
A notable achievement of the National Health Insurance Law in 1995 was that practically all the Israeli population was insured and thus entitled to the services included in the 'health basket'. Nevertheless, as of 2016, there are roughly 250,000 non-tourists that stay in Israel for long periods that are not entitled to the benefits of the National Health Insurance Law. About 100,000 of them are foreign workers who entered Israel legally and have a mandatory private health insurance that is paid by their employer. Another 100,000 are people who entered Israel legally (as tourists or as foreign workers) but became illegal residents after overstaying their visas. The remaining 50,000 are work immigrants, asylum seekers and refugees, mainly from Eritrea and Sudan, who entered Israel illegally through the Egyptian border (prior to the construction of the Egypt–Israel barrier). For those illegal residents that are working full-time, there is a mandatory health insurance by the employer. This insurance is limited as it is dependent on the continued work and payments subtracted from salary, thus becoming ineffective and practically expires as the insured becomes unemployed from health reasons. Additionally, asylum seekers under 18 or over 60 who are not slated for deportation are entitled to purchase health insurance.

For the 'illegal residents' that don't have effective health insurance and are protected from deportation to their countries of origin (because of the ongoing conflicts or forced recruitment), a few services were developed either by the Israel Ministry of Health or by local NGOs and international aid organizations. The most important services include free access to Emergency Rooms and hospitalization services when needed for urgent care, primary care clinics, and a psychiatric clinic. There is a Public Health Clinic in Tel Aviv jointly run by the Terem organization and the Israeli Health Ministry which provides emergency care, specialist services in a number of fields, and dental care to people who do not qualify for coverage under the National Health Insurance Law and have no other source of coverage, aside from tourists. Eritrean and Sudanese asylum seekers make up a large part of its client base.

== Medical facilities ==
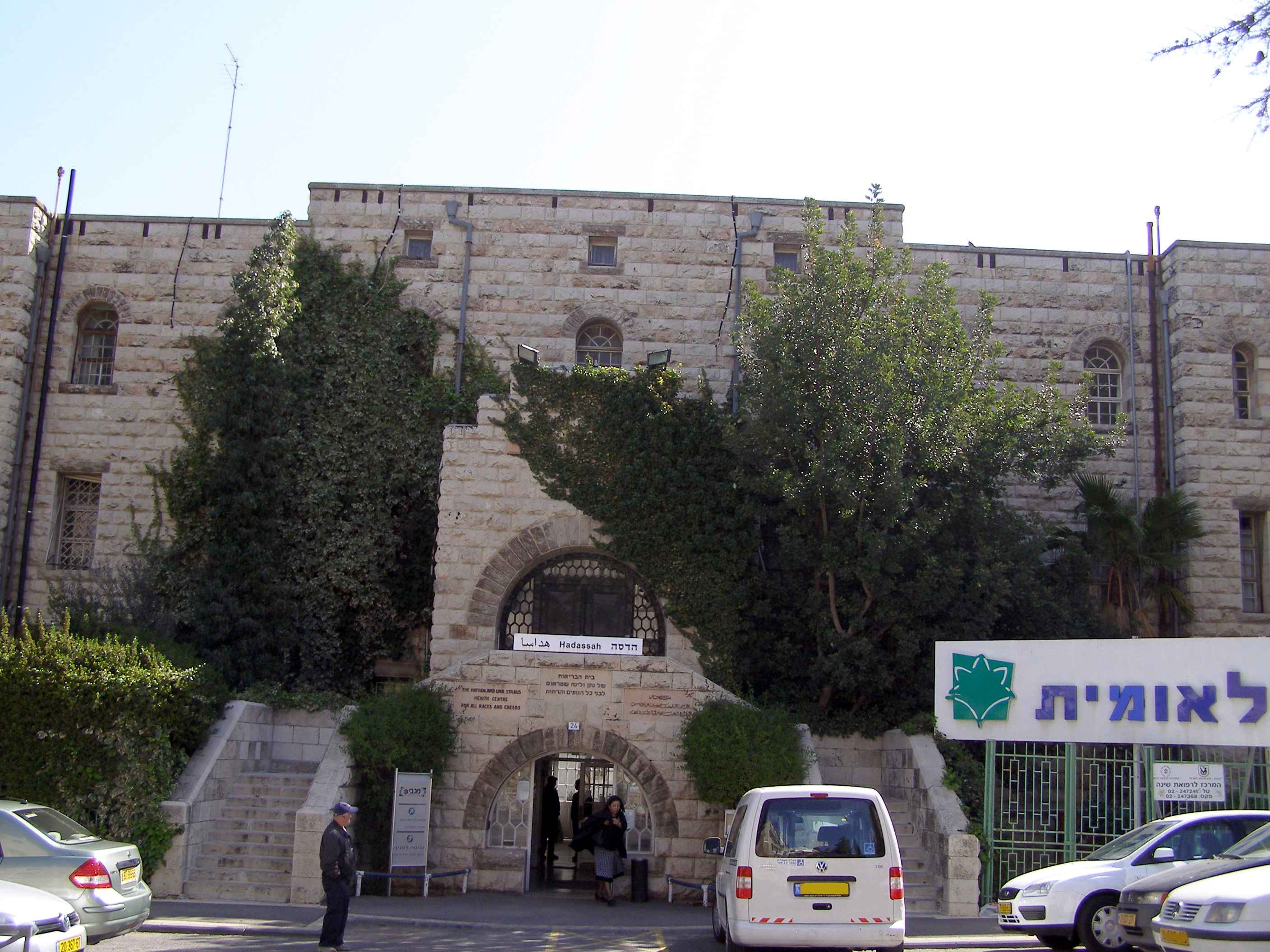
Beit Habriyut Straus, Jerusalem, built in 1927

In the end of 2014, there were 85 hospitals in Israel: 44 general hospitals, 12 mental health hospitals, 29 specialized hospitals (geriatric and rehabilitation centers), as well as 278 residential long-term facilities. Of the general hospitals, 11 are government-owned and operated by the Ministry of Health (accounting for 46.5% of hospital beds in Israel), 8 are owned by Clalit (accounting for 30.4% of hospital beds in Israel), and the rest are private, such as Herzliya Medical Center. Most of the private hospitals in Israel belong to nonprofit or charitable organizations.

Public clinics and pharmacies, along with other medical facilities, are operated by the four Kupot Holim, each of which operates its own chain. Clalit has the largest network of medical facilities, with about 1,400 clinics and 420 pharmacies. Leumit operates 320 clinics and 150 pharmacies. Maccabi operates 150 clinics, 43 pharmacies, and 20 diagnostic and therapeutic centers. Meuhedet operates 250 clinics and 40 pharmacies. In addition, there are hundreds of private clinics and pharmacies, some of which contract with the Kupot Holim to provide services to their members.

Public satisfaction with hospital care is considerably less than with other aspects of the healthcare system. There are 3.1 beds per 1000 population, compared with an OECD average of 4.8. Occupancy runs at 96%. The average length of stay is 4.3 days, compared with the OECD average of 6.5. There are long waiting lists which has led more than 75% of the population to take out secondary health insurance.

== Medical research ==
Israel is a world leader in medical and paramedical research, and bioengineering capabilities. Biotechnology, medical, and clinical research account for over half of Israel's scientific publications, and the industrial sector uses this extensive knowledge to develop new pharmaceuticals, medical equipment, and treatment therapies. Among other areas of medicine, Israel is a leader in stem cell research, with the largest number of articles, patents and research studies per capita, as well as research into regenerative medicine and medical marijuana.

== See also ==
- Health in Israel
- Healthcare compared
- Helena Kagan
- Science and technology in Israel
