= Naomi Amir =

American-Israeli pediatric neurologist

- Born: Naomi Kassan; January 23, 1931; Chicago, Illinois, US
- Died: January 4, 1995 (aged 63); Jerusalem, Israel
- Education: M.D., New York University School of Medicine (1952); M.D., Hebrew University of Jerusalem (1957)
- Occupation: Pediatric neurologist
- Years active: 1968–1995
- Known for: Established first pediatric neurology clinic in Israel
- Medical career
- Institutions: Bikur Holim Hospital; Shaare Zedek Medical Center

Naomi Amir (Hebrew: נעמי אמיר; January 23, 1931 – January 4, 1995) was an American-Israeli pediatric neurologist. After earning her M.D. at New York University School of Medicine in 1952, she undertook her residency at Hadassah-Hebrew University Medical Center in Jerusalem the following year. Choosing to specialize in the field of pediatric neurology, which at the time was new to Israel, she established the first pediatric neurology clinic in Israel in 1968 at Bikur Holim Hospital. She later expanded this clinic into a full-service diagnostic, evaluation, and intervention center. In 1990 she and her team moved to Shaare Zedek Medical Center. She is credited as "the founder of modern child neurology in Israel".

== Early life and education ==
Naomi Kassan was born in Chicago, Illinois, to Shalom Kassan, a Jewish Palestinian émigré, and Eva Dushkin, a first-generation American child of Eastern European immigrants. She had one older sibling. When she was four, her family moved to Palestine, where her father was a judge in the Mandatory Palestine legal service. Eighteen months later her mother took the children back to the United States for a year, returning to Palestine in 1937. The following year her mother returned to New York City permanently with the children.

Naomi graduated from The Bronx High School of Science. She earned her B.A. from New York University and her medical degree from the New York University School of Medicine in 1952. Desiring to live in Israel, she undertook her residency at the Hadassah-Hebrew University Medical Center in Jerusalem beginning in 1953. She completed her second M.D. at the Hebrew University of Jerusalem in 1957.

== Career ==
When Amir chose to specialize in pediatric neurology, this field was not yet recognized in Israel, and women represented a small minority of physicians in the country. Amir was mentored by Dr. Helena Kagan, founder and head of the department of pediatrics at Bikur Holim Hospital in Jerusalem. Kagan offered her a small room separate from the pediatrics ward to use as a neurological clinic.

Before establishing her practice, Amir returned to New York for two years to take a clinical fellowship at the Neurological Institute of Columbia Presbyterian Medical Center. She returned to Israel in 1968 to establish the first pediatric neurology rehabilitation daycare center in the country at Bikur Holim Hospital. This center offered both inpatient and outpatient services, and included a rehabilitation kindergarten in which Amir and her team could evaluate interventions over the long-term. In 1979 Amir expanded the center into a full-service diagnostic, evaluation, and intervention day hospital. In its first six years, the day-hospital screened more than 1,000 children. A sleep clinic for children was installed in 1984.

In 1990 Amir and her team of seven specialists moved to Shaare Zedek Medical Center, which provided an entire wing for her day-hospital. In 2009 the rehabilitation kindergarten moved into its own facility adjacent to the medical center. Approximately 70 children ages 3 to 7 are enrolled in the kindergarten, half of whom will eventually enter regular schools.

Amir also practiced at the Spafford Clinic in the Old City of Jerusalem, treating Muslim children, and the Mukassed Hospital on the Mount of Olives. She set up a number of satellite neurology clinics in Arab villages.

== Research interests ==
Amir co-edited two books and co-authored numerous peer-reviewed articles. Her research interests included cognitive development, epilepsy, neurometabolic disorders, aphasia, and developmental disorders.

Amir joined the staff of the Hebrew University of Jerusalem in 1974 as a lecturer. She became a clinical senior lecturer in 1983 and a clinical associate professor in 1993.

== Honors ==
She received the Israeli Women of Achievement Award in 1989.

== Personal life ==
Naomi married Shlomo Amir in March 1955. They had two sons and one daughter. Naomi died of cancer on January 4, 1995.

== Selected bibliography ==
=== Books ===
- Pediatric & Adolescent Medicine: Childhood Seizures. Karger. 1995. ISBN 978-3-8055-6009-2. (co-edited with S. Shinnar)
- Pediatric Neurology: Behavior and Cognition of the Child with Brain Dysfunction. Karger Publishers. 1991. ISBN 978-3-8055-5223-3. (co-edited with Isabelle Rapin)

=== Articles ===
- Gross-Tsur, Varda; Shalev, Ruth S.; Wertman-Elad, Raya; Landau, Heddy; Amir, Naomi (1994). "Neurobehavioral profile of children with persistent hyperinsulinemic hypoglycemia of infancy". Developmental Neuropsychology. 10 (2): 153–63. doi:10.1080/87565649409540574.
- Amir, Naomi; Elpeleg, Orly N.; Shalev, Ruth S.; Christensen, Ernst (June 1989). "Glutaric aciduria type I: Enzymatic and neuroradiologic investigations of two kindreds". The Journal of Pediatrics. 114 (6): 983–9. doi:10.1016/S0022-3476(89)80442-1. PMID 2723913.
- Brand, Abraham; Keren, Andre; Reifen, Ram M.; Gross-Kieselstein, Eva; Amir, Naomi (March 1, 1989). "Echocardiographic and Doppler findings in the Williams syndrome". American Journal of Cardiology. 63 (9): 633–5. doi:10.1016/0002-9149(89)90916-8. PMID 2645763.
- Shalev, Ruth S.; Gross-Tsur, Varda; Wine, Judith M.; Amir, Naomi (January 1, 1988). "Development of color association in normal and neurologically impaired children". Pediatric Neurology. 4 (2): 110–112. doi:10.1016/0887-8994(88)90050-1. PMID 2468343.
- Amir, Naomi; Zlotogora, Joel; Bach, Gideon (June 1987). "Mucolipidosis Type IV: Clinical Spectrum and Natural History". Pediatrics. 79 (6): 953–9. doi:10.1542/peds.79.6.953. PMID 2438637.
- Brand, Abraham; Shalev, Ruth S.; Amir, Naomi (1986). "Valproic acid in neonatal status convulsivus". Brain and Development. 8 (3): 278–280. doi:10.1016/S0387-7604(86)80082-1. PMID 3094397. S2CID 4723119.
- Amir, Naomi; Gross-Kielsenstein, Eva; Hirsch, Harry J. (December 1984). "Weaver-Smith Syndrome: A Case Study With Long-term Follow-up". JAMA Pediatrics. 138 (12): 1113–7. doi:10.1001/archpedi.1984.02140500019006. PMID 6209982.
- Amir, Naomi; Shalev, Ruth S.; Berman, Miriam; Gilai, Aryeh; Mor, Joseph (February 1984). "Steroid-responsive postinfectious sensorineural hearing loss". Annals of Neurology. 15 (2): 212–213. doi:10.1002/ana.410150222. PMID 6703663. S2CID 40481457.
