= Meir Hospital =

- Clalit Health Services
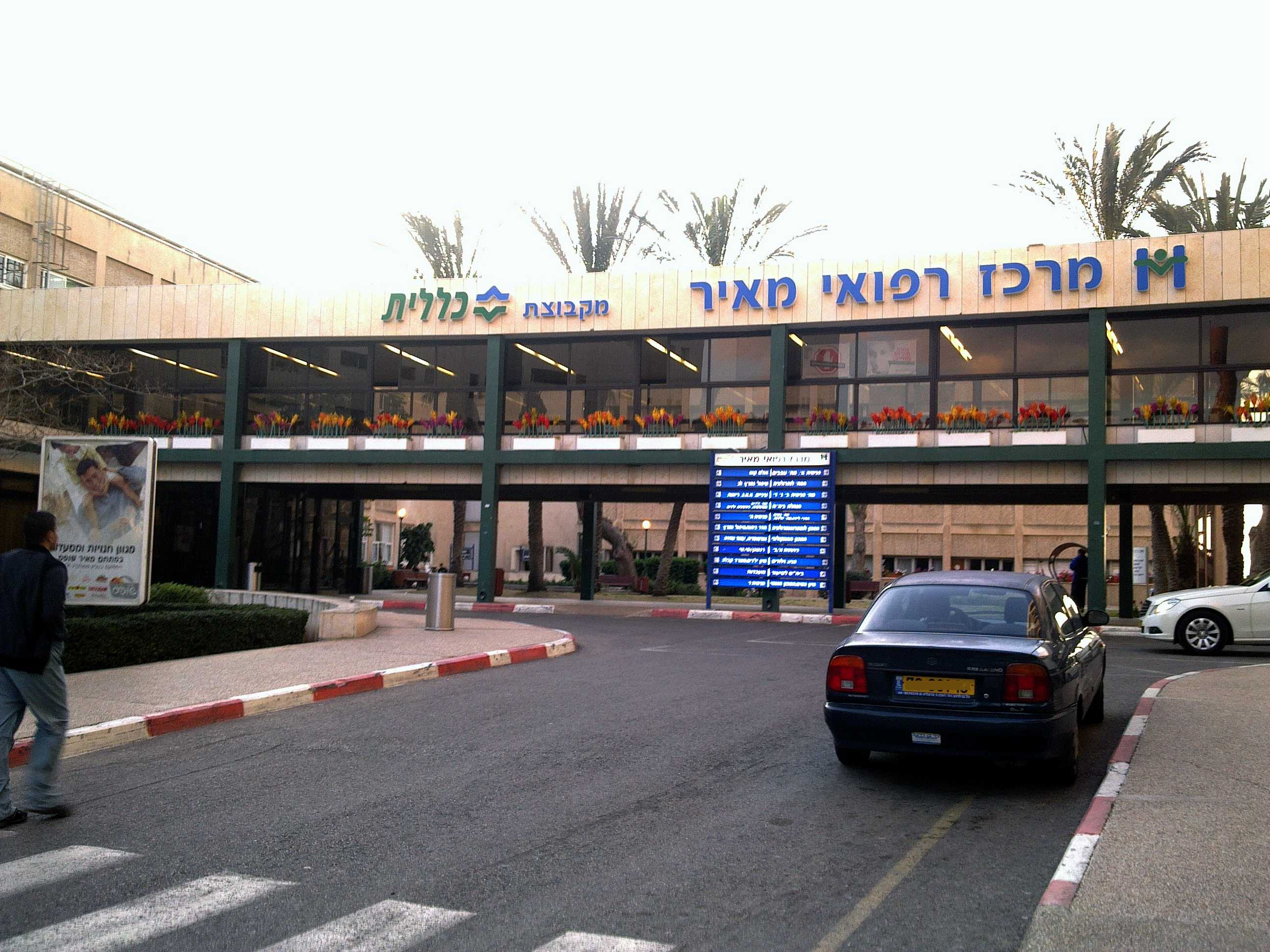

Geography
- Location: Kfar Saba, Israel
- Coordinates: 32°10′55″N 34°53′45″E

Organisation
- Type: District General, Teaching
- Affiliated university: Sackler Faculty of Medicine, Bar-Ilan University, Tel Aviv University

Services
- Beds: 780

History
- Opened: July 15, 1956; 70 years ago

Links
- Website: www.mmc.org.il

Meir Medical Center (Hebrew: מרכז רפואי מאיר, Merkaz Refu'i Me'ir) is regional hospital in Kfar Saba, Israel. It is the seventh largest hospital complex in the country, and is part of a network of hospitals owned and operated by Clalit Health Services.

== History ==
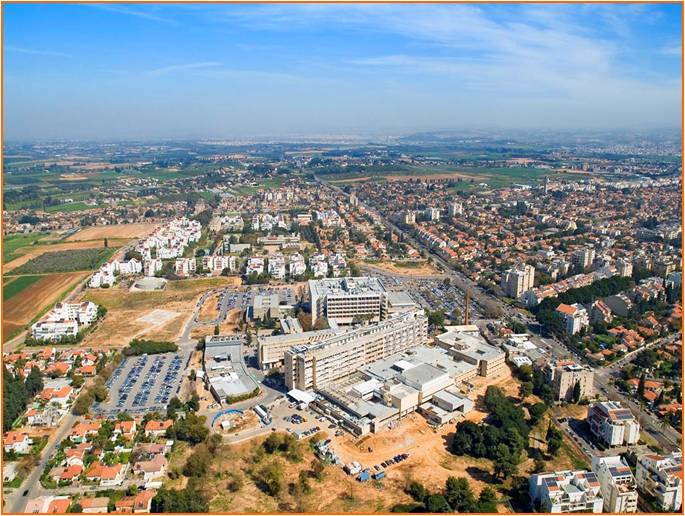
Meir Medical Center

The medical facility in Kfar Saba was opened to the public on July 15, 1956, as a hospital for tuberculosis and diseases of the respiratory system. Later in 1962, Meir was turned into a general hospital and is now part of the Sapir Medical Center. Clalit Health Services (formerly known as Kupat Holim Clalit) built the original hospital thanks to the pivotal influence of Dr. Alfred Grünebaum.

Meir Hospital serves the ethnically diverse communities of the highly populated eastern Sharon plain, including Israeli Arab or Palestinian patients from the Triangle towns and villages. The hospital is named after Dr. Joseph Meir (1890–1955). Meir thought healthcare should be an equal public service, without elitism, and worked towards that goal after arriving in Palestine during the Third Aliyah.

== Services ==
Meir Hospital teaching departments are affiliated with the Sackler School of Medicine, Tel Aviv University, while laboratories are affiliated to Bar Ilan University. Meir Medical Center specializes in the treatment of pulmonary diseases and spinal surgery and is accredited under the JCI. It is the base hospital for the Israeli Olympic team.

- 801 beds for hospitalization
- 60 seats in the outpatient clinic
- 57 seats for admission to hospital births
- 28 sites to undergo dialysis
- 122 clinics

=== Inpatient Facilities ===
- 5 Adult Internal Medicine Wards
- 2 Obstretrics Wards
- Gynaecology/Oncogynaecology ward
- Acute/Rehabilitative Geriatrics ward
- Respiratory Medicine/Thoracic Surgery ward
- 2 General Surgery wards
- 2 Orthopaedic Surgery wards
- Spinal Surgery/Vascular Surgery ward
- ENT Surgery ward
- Ophthalmology ward
- Urology ward
- Haematoncology Unit
- General Intensive Care Unit
- Respiratory/Internal Medicine Intensive Care Unit
- Coronary Care Unit/Cardiac Intensive Care

=== Outpatient and Procedural Units ===
- Gastroenterology Unit including Endoscopy Suite
- Oncology Unit
- Nephrology and Dialysis Unit
- Nuclear Medicine
- Respiratory Medicine and Pulmonary Function Testing and Interventional Pulmonology/Bronchoscopy Unit
- Rheumatology Day Unit
- Infectious Diseases Unit
- Cardiac Cath Lab
- Cardiac Electrophysiology Suite
- Echocardiography Unit
- Liaison Psychiatry

=== Operating Theatres ===
- General Operating Theatres
- Obstretics and Gynaecology Theatres
- Delivery Rooms

=== Radiology ===
- Angiography/Invasive Radiology Unit
- 2 CT scanners
- 2 MRI scanners
- General Ultrasound
- Gynaecological Ultrasound

== See also ==
- Health care in Israel
