= Bikur Cholim Hospital =

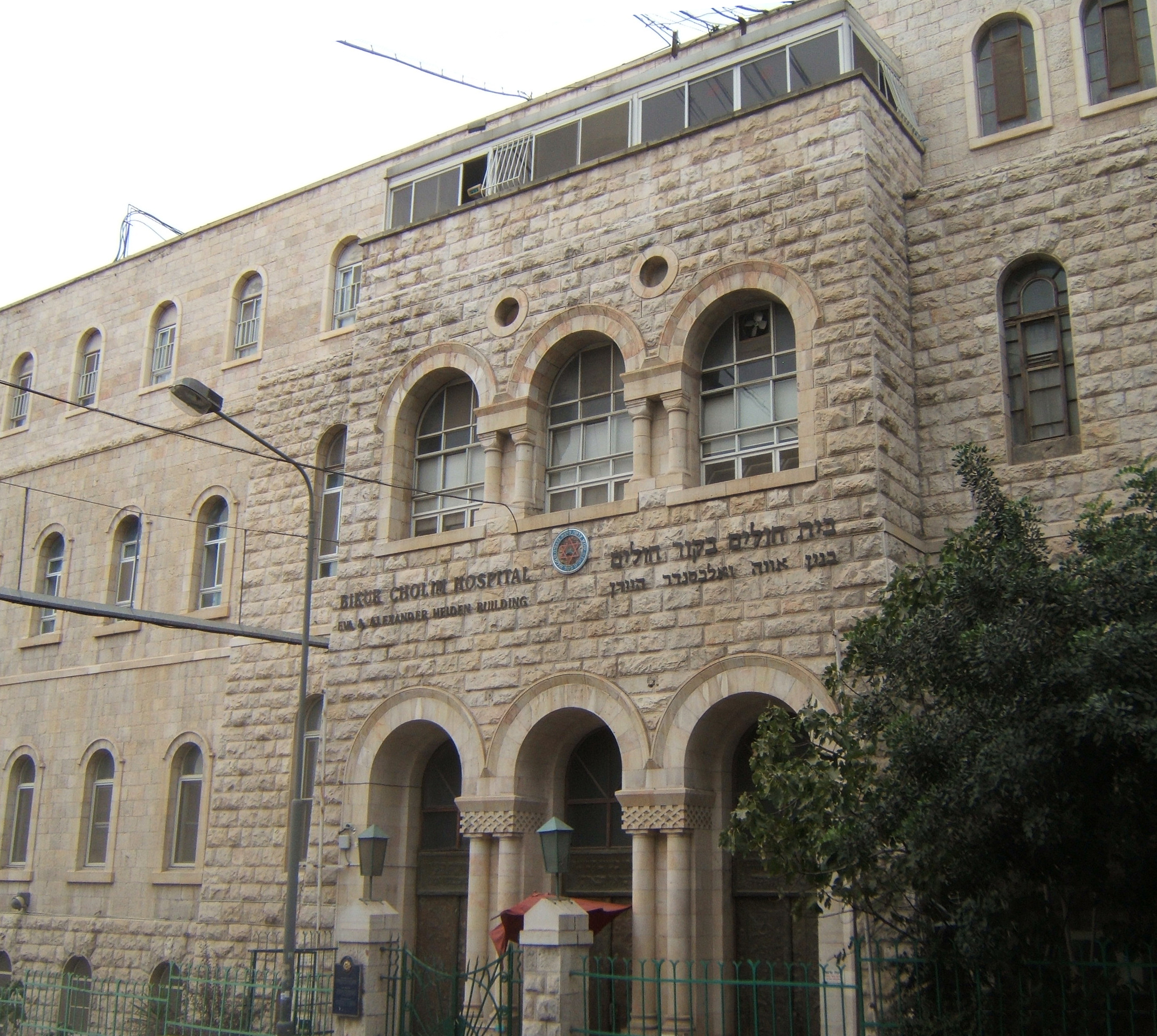
- Bikur Cholim Hospital in downtown Jerusalem. The sign says Shaare Zedek Medical Center, of which it became a branch in 2012.

Geography
- Location: West Jerusalem
- Coordinates: 31°47′02″N 35°13′05″E

Organisation
- Care system: Non-profit
- Type: District General
- Affiliated university: Hebrew University of Jerusalem
- Network: Shaare Zedek Medical Center

Services
- Emergency department: yes
- Beds: 200

History
- Founded: c. 1826
- Closed: c. 2020

Bikur Cholim Hospital (Hebrew: בית החולים ביקור חולים) was a 200-bed general hospital in West Jerusalem, established in 1826 and which closed around 2020. Until then, it was the oldest hospital in the country still operating.

Bikur Cholim had obstetrics and cardiology departments, a modern neonatal intensive care unit, a pediatrics department, and bariatric and plastic surgery units. After 2010 it treated some 60,000 patients annually. With 700 administrators, doctors, nurses, technicians and cleaners, it was one of Jerusalem's largest downtown employers. One-third of the doctors were Israeli Arabs, many of whom chose Bikur Holim for their residencies.

In December 2012 the hospital was taken over by Shaare Zedek Medical Center and continued to function as a branch of Shaare Zedek. The main hospital was then closed down, with the building on Haneviim (Prophets') Street, the maternity ward, which serves the residents of the nearby neighborhoods and various clinics, continuing to operate. At the same time, plans were submitted to the planning authorities for the restoration of the historic structure and its integration into a complex that includes commercial and housing areas. In 2020, the authorities decided to also close the maternity ward, following guidelines which require such wards be located next to hospitals that can provide special medical services in case they are needed.

== History ==
=== Old City (c. 1826-1947) ===
Bikur Cholim opened in a rented building in the Old City in 1826. In 1843, it had three rooms for patients. It was run by the Bikur Cholim society. After the Mission established a medical facility in the Old City, hoping to attract Jews, the society intensified its activity. In 1854, a building was purchased which soon grew overcrowded. In 1864, another complex of buildings was acquired incorporating treatment rooms, a pharmacy, a hospice for the terminally ill and administrative offices. The Ashkenazi Perushim Hospital, as it was known, became the favorite charity of the British Jewish philanthropist Moses Montefiore, who described the facility in his diary in 1875. The general ward consisted of two rooms, each with eight beds. One room was reserved for men, and the other for women. In 1893, the hospital cared for 781 patients and treated 12,347 people in its out-patient clinics.

The alley where the hospital stood between 1864 and 1947 is now named after it: Bikur Holim Street, known in Arabic as Ṭarīq Ḥāret ash-Sharaf ('Sharaf Quarter Road').

=== New building (1925) ===
In 1898, during his visit to Jerusalem, German emperor Wilhelm II donated a large amount of money used for purchasing the plot of land on which the new hospital was built, on what is now Nathan Straus Street.

By 1907, hospitalizations exceeded 1,000 per annum. A decision was reached to build a new hospital outside the walls of the Old City. The cornerstone of the new building was laid in 1912, but construction work was delayed by the outbreak of World War I.

The building on Chancellor Avenue (now Straus Street), just off Jaffa Road, was completed in 1925 and opened its doors to all residents of Jerusalem, Jews and non-Jews. The hospital in the Old City continued to treat the chronically ill until 1947.

Many of the wounded from the 1929 Palestine riots and 1936–39 Arab revolt in Palestine were brought to Bikur Holim. Jewish underground fighters were hospitalized under fictitious names to keep the British mandatory police from finding them. During the War of Independence in 1948, the hospital came under artillery fire from Jordanian guns. Hadassah Hospital on Mount Scopus was evacuated, and many patients were transferred to Bikur Holim.

=== Former German Hospital as maternity ward ===
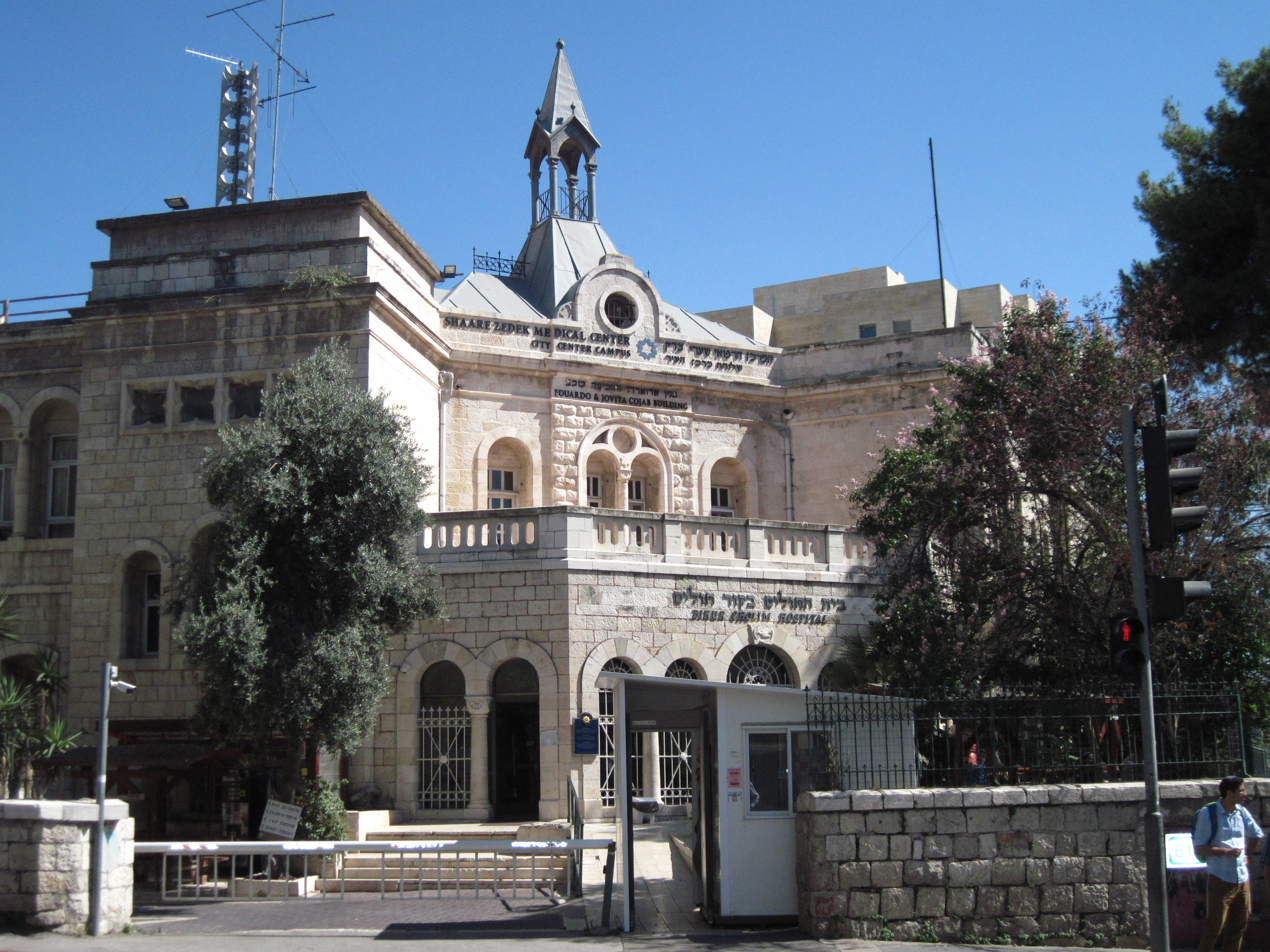
Ziv maternity wing in the former German Hospital

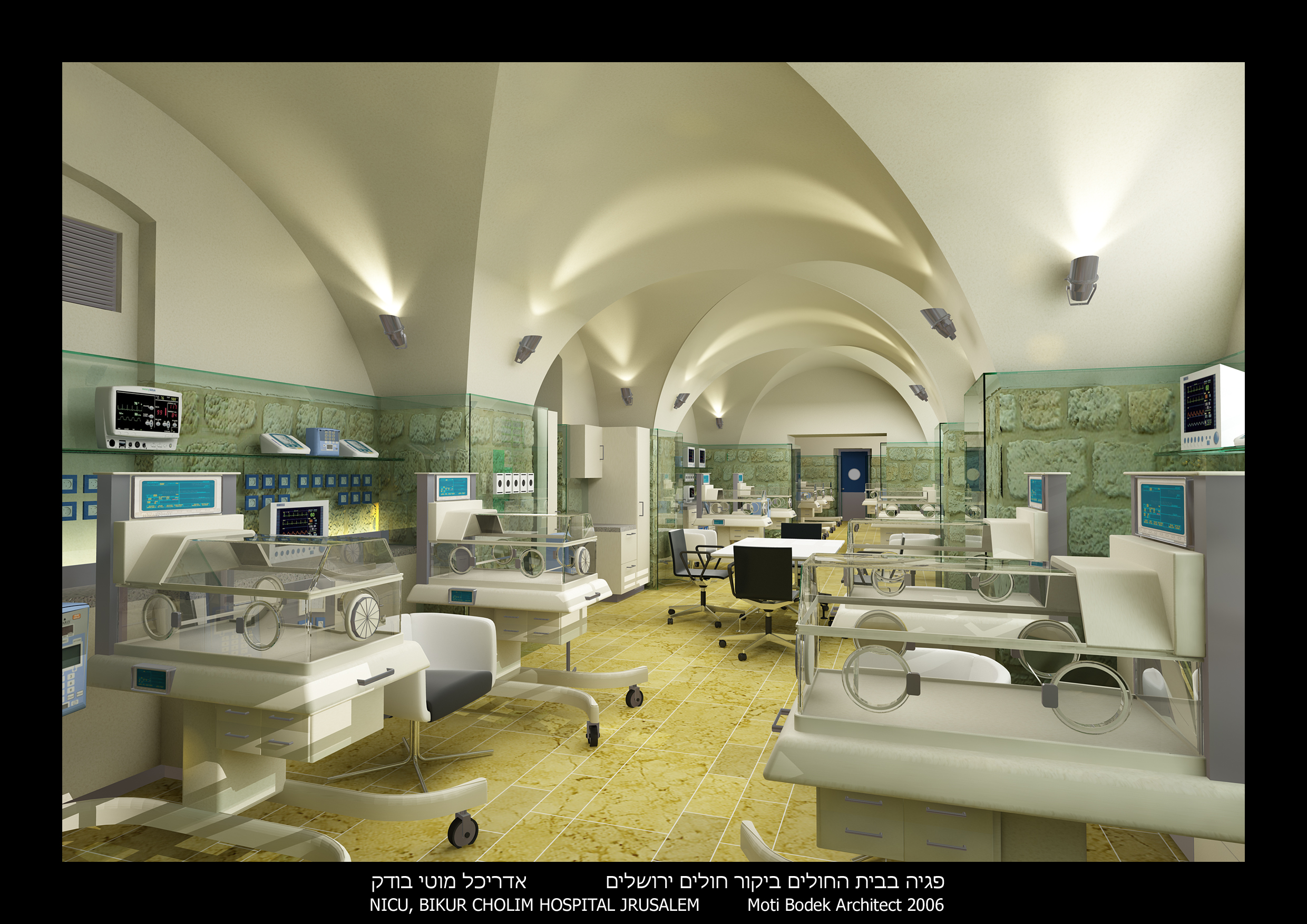
Bikur Cholim neonatal unit by Moti Bodek Architects

The former German Deaconesses' Hospital at the corner of Straus and Prophets Street is now the eastern wing of Bikur Holim Hospital. The German Hospital opened in 1894 and used the building until c. 1937. After 1948 it was taken over by Israel as the "Ziv Hospital". Today, as part of Bikur Cholim Hospital which is being operated as a branch of Shaare Zedek Medical Center, it houses the maternity ward, with the department for gynecological and obstetric endocrinology.

=== Financial difficulties and demise ===
In 2007, the Russian-Israeli tycoon Arkadi Gaydamak saved the hospital from bankruptcy, taking it over from receivership. In 2010, Gaydamak stopped funding the hospital and returned to Russia.

The hospital's medical director, Raphael Pollack, said in 2012 that its financial difficulties are due to the system of discounts exacted from the hospitals by health maintenance organizations (HMOs) and debt repayment.

== Importance ==
The location of the hospital in downtown Jerusalem has proven critical in times of emergency. With Jerusalem's other hospitals are located far from the center, Bikur Holim was able to save the lives of many victims of terrorist attacks. According to the head of the emergency ward, "If somebody's life is in danger and they need immediate help, realizing that the brain only has six minutes before it's too late, then 20 minutes is too late. It's coming dead on arrival."

== Religious orientation ==
Situated near the religious neighborhoods of Geula and Mea Shearim, Bikur Holim used to admit a very high percentage of Haredi Jews, and tried to cater to their needs. Shabbat was strictly observed. Non-Jewish employees recorded medical information and answered telephones on the Sabbath. Food was warmed in ovens operated by a timer, in keeping with Orthodox religious rulings.

== Architecture ==
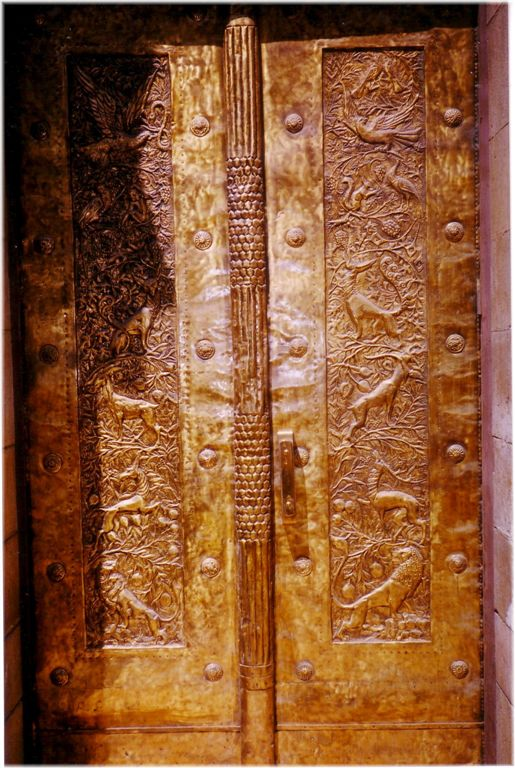
Hospital doors by Ze'ev Raban

The main wing of the current building was designed by architect Zvi Joseph Barsky in the Neoclassical style with modernist elements. Zeev Raban of the Bezalel Arts School designed the bronze doors.

The former German Deaconesses Hospital, now the Ziv maternity wing of the Bikur Cholim Hospital, was designed by architect Conrad Schick.

When Arcady Gaydamak bought the hospital for $35 million in 2007, he commissioned plans, designed by the architect Moti Bodek to build two hospitalization towers alongside the existing historical structure.

== Notable physicians ==
- Naomi Amir, founder and head of the pediatric neurology clinic and day-hospital
- Aron Brand, pediatrics
- Helena Kagan, founder and head of the department of pediatrics

== See also ==
- Health care in Israel
