= Kupat Holim Meuhedet =

Health insurance organization in Israel

Meuhedet
- Meuhedet Health Services
- קופת חולים מאוחדת

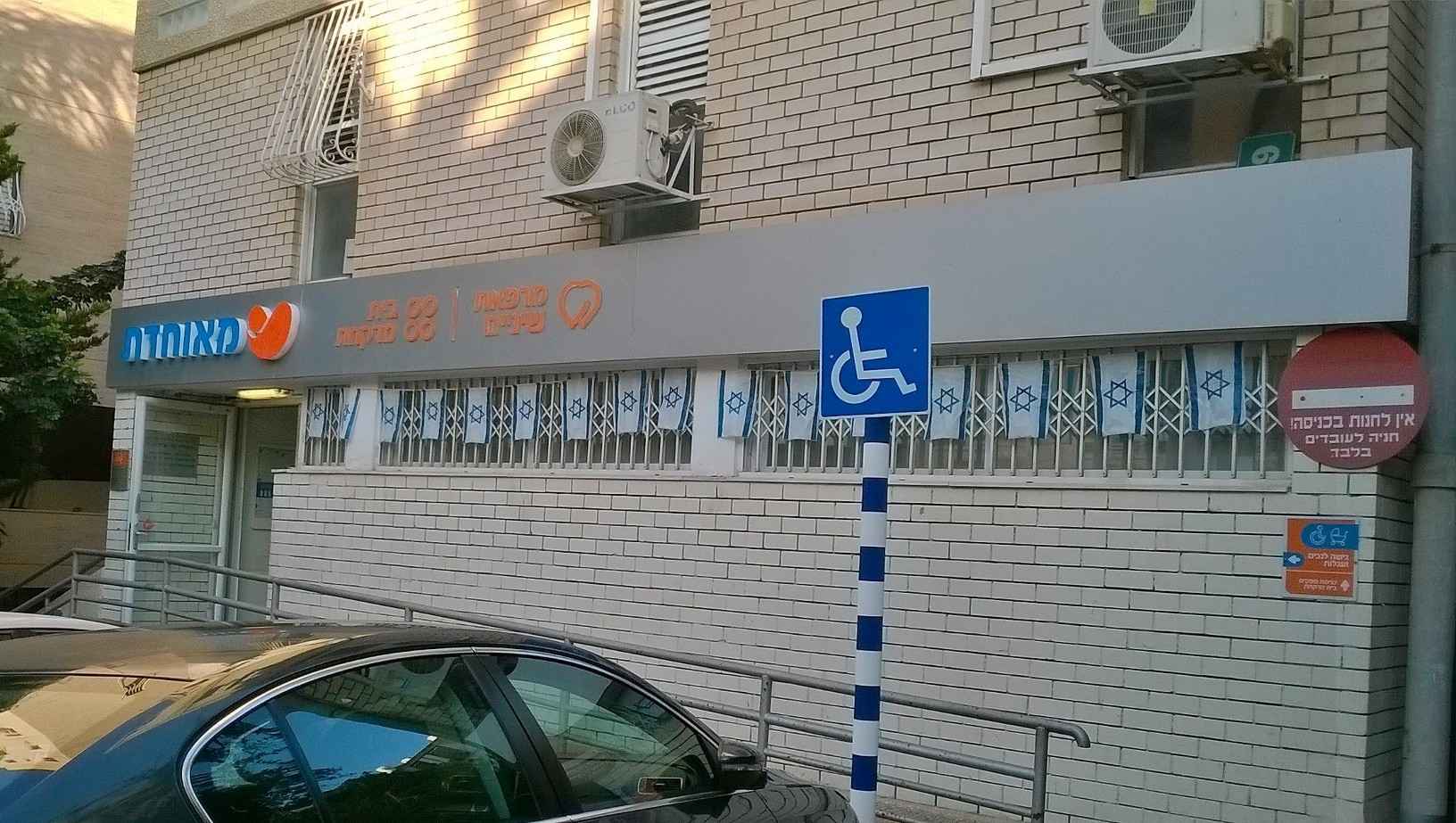
- Meuhedet branch in Ramat Gan
- Founded: 1974; 52 years ago
- Headquarters: 124 Ibn Gavirol St., Tel Aviv, Israel
- CEO: Uzi Bitan
- Key people: Eyal Gabay, Chief Executive Officer
- Website: www.meuhedet.co.il

Kupat Holim Meuhedet (Hebrew: קופת חולים מאוחדת, lit. United Sickness Fund) is Israel's third largest health insurance and medical services organization and is one of four state-mandated health funds (Kupot Holim) that Israeli residents must belong to under Israel's universal healthcare framework.

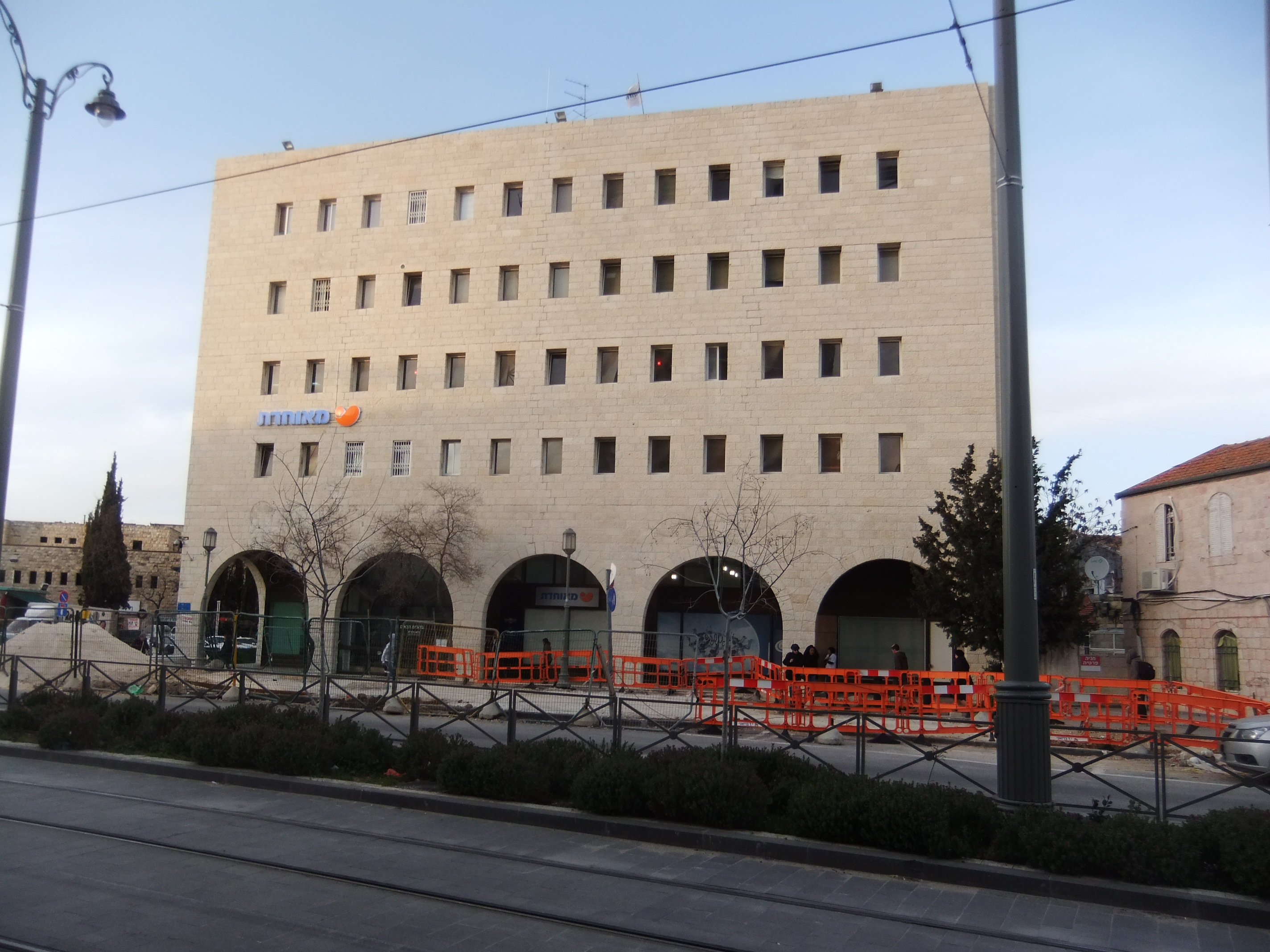
The main Meuhedet office on Jaffa Road in Jerusalem.

As of 2024, Meuhedet had approximately 1.3 million members, about 13.99% percent of the population.

== History ==
The organization was founded in 1974 as the result of a merger (hence the "Union" in its name) of two Kupot Holim: The Common Health Fund (קופת חולים עממית) established in 1931 by Hadassah, and the General Zionists' Health Fund (קופת חולים של הציונים הכלליים) established in 1936. These two predecessor organizations were formed during the prestatal Yishuv period and, like the other health funds in Israel, were modeled after the German medical mutual-aid societies (Krankenkasse) of the late 19th and early 20th century.

In 2005, Meuhedet took over Misgav Ladach hospital in Jerusalem, turning it into a diagnostic center and in 2019 purchased Nara medical which operates several private surgical facilities across Israel.

Uzi Bitan has been CEO since December 2022.

== See also ==
- Health care in Israel
