= Joel-Cohen incision =

Surgical prodecure used for C-section

Joel-Cohen incision is a skin incision used for Caesarean section. It is a straight incision that is 3 cm below the line joining both anterior superior iliac spines. It is similar to the Pfannenstiel incision, another commonly used incision in obstetric surgery. The Joel-Cohen cesarean section technique relies more heavily on blunt dissection than the traditional Pfannenstiel technique. Joel-Cohen technique has lower rates of fever, hospital stay, post-operative pain and blood loss compared to Pfannenstiel. The operating time and use of analgesia are also reduced. Additionally, the time needed to get out of bed, walk without support and time for re-appearance of audible intestinal sounds were shorter in Joel-Cohen group than the Pfannenstiel group in a study conducted with 153 women. In the two studies (with 411 participants) that compared the Joel-Cohen incision with the Pfannenstiel incision, the Joel-Cohen incision was associated with a 65% reduction in postoperative febrile morbidity.

== Technique ==
The skin incision is made 3 cm above the location of Pfannenstiel incision. The subcutaneous tissue is incised in three medial centimetres. The lateral tissue separation is done manually and the fascia is divided by blunt dissection using both index fingers. This incision is extended laterally by the fingers.
