= Health in Israel =

Life expectancy development in Israel

Health in Israel is advanced and efficient, compared to other developed counties, where Israel spends a relatively low proportion of their gross domestic product on health, which is 7.3%, compared to 9.3% in the OECD and 18% in the US. With the passing of the 1995 National Healthcare Law, there is mandated universal healthcare, for 100% of the population, funded by a health tax which is a fixed percentage of income. This health care 'basket' includes a list of services mandated by the Ministry of health. Individuals can purchase coverage for additional services for an extra charge. Despite the cost savings in healthcare, the health status in Israel is satisfactory compared to other countries. Infant mortality is low, at 2.14 per 1000 live births compared to above 5 in US. Life expectancy is 81.7 years, as opposed to 76.3 years in the Europe.

== Common causes of death ==
The top 3 causes of death in Israel (2022) include:

1. Cancer: 122 deaths per 100,000 population
2. Heart disease: 68 deaths per 100,000 population
3. Covid 19: 46 deaths per 100,000 population*

*Vaccination rate for COVID of 81% similar to the US

== Cancer ==
In 2003, Israel had the second highest rate of skin cancer in the world, However, this has decreased substantially since then due to public health campaigns recommending avoiding the hottest time of day, discouraging sun-bathing and using sun protection such as greater clothing coverage and sunscreen. According to the Israel Cancer Association, the incidence is significantly higher among Israeli Jews than among Arabs and higher among "Israeli natives" than among "individuals of Oriental/Middle Eastern descent".

Hereditary breast, ovarian and melanoma cancer rates are particularly acute in Ashkenazi Jewish populations in Israel (31.8% of Israeli Jews), in-part due to a higher-prevalence of BRCA and BRCA2 mutations (1 in 40 vs 1 in 400 in most populations worldwide) in Ashkenazi Jewish populations, which increase the likelihood of hereditary cancers.

== Overweight and obesity ==
In 2013–2015, adult overweight & obesity rates in Israel were 36.7% and 17.8% respectively. Socioeconomic status was one factor that impacted overweight and obesity percentages, particularly for women. Women in lower classes were four times as likely to be overweight or obese as women in upper classes. Only 20.2% of the entire population reported that they exercised for twenty minutes or more three times a week.

The frequency of exercise among the Jewish Israeli population was twice as high as that for the Arab population. Men and women of Arab descent are more likely to be of an unhealthy weight than Jewish men and women. Obesity is also far more common among Haredi Jews than secular Jews.

== Smoking ==
Smoking prevalence among males remained relatively constant at 30% in the years 1994–2004. Among females, the prevalence declined slightly from 25% in 1998 to 18% in 2003. For youth, 14% smoked at least once per week in a 2001 publication.

In 2005, Israeli youths have begun to use bidis and hookah, as alternative methods of tobacco use. In 1990, smoking was the cause of about 1,800 male deaths in Israel which was around 12% of all male deaths. Smoking has not been found to be a significant cause of death among Israeli women. The average number of cigarettes smoked per Israeli per year stands at 2162 (6).

There are several anti-tobacco use legislations in effect. For instance, advertising is prohibited in youth publications and is forbidden on television and radio. In addition to substantial increases in tobacco taxation, although comparatively the prices are still among the lowest compared to all of the European countries. Until 2004, there was no minimum age requirement for buying tobacco products in Israel, however, an amendment to the tobacco marketing and advertisement law that became effective in 2004 has limited the sale of tobacco to people above the age of 18.

According to the Israel Central Bureau of Statistics, the smoking rate in the Israeli adult population in 2009 was 20.9%, down from 34% in 2000. A Ministry of Health nationwide survey conducted in 2011 found that 20.6% of the population aged 21 and older were smokers. The highest percentage of smokers was among Arab males, 44% of whom smoked, though this figure is down from 50% in 1996.

In 2014, 19.8% of adult Israelis smoked, 26.3% in the Arab population and 18.4% in the Jewish population. 35% of non-smoking respondents to the World Health Survey reported that they had been exposed to passive smoking. Smoking is responsible for about 8,000 deaths in Israel every year, of which about 700 among passive smokers. The cost of the damage caused by smoking to the health system is estimated at NIS 1.7 billion (about $440 million) a year. The annual loss of working capacity and paid sick days in the wider economy is estimated at NIS 1.9 billion ($490 million). About NIS 8.2 billion ($2.12 billion) is spent on tobacco products each year. 40 tons of tobacco worth some NIS 24 million ($6.2 million) and about 1.3 million cigarette packs were intercepted at the border crossing between Israel and the Palestinian Authority in 2014.

In 2024, approximately 20% of the adult population smoked. The percentage was about 40% among adults in the Arab sector and 54% among Haredi high school students. Some public officials expressed concern that the percentage of smokers had not declined.

== Peanut Allergy ==
In early 2000 it was noted that children in Israel have a low prevalence of peanut allergy. This led to a study, in Israel and the United Kingdom, where early exposure to products containing peanuts, in infancy, led to a lower risk of peanut allergy. A similar study was conducted in the US in 2015 (the LEAP study) with similar results, and it was confirmed again in a 2024 study. With these findings, the American Academy of Pediatrics changed the guidelines for exposure of infants to peanut-containing products.

== Climate change ==
Climate change directly affects vulnerable populations such as women, children, the elderly, and the chronically ill. Increasing heat waves, decreasing rainfall, worsening air quality, lack of access to drinking water and food disproportionately affect these populations. Populations who suffer from chronic disorders are more susceptible to health issues related to poor air quality, high temperatures, and water-borne illnesses. Extreme heat caused by climate change can also be dangerous for pregnant women and affect child development in the womb. Migrants, refugees, Palestinians, and Bedouins who are not connected to the electricity grid may not be able to afford air conditioners or have access to healthcare facilities.

== See also ==
- Healthcare in Israel
- Universal healthcare in Israel
