= Tipat Halav =

Network of healthcare centers in Israel

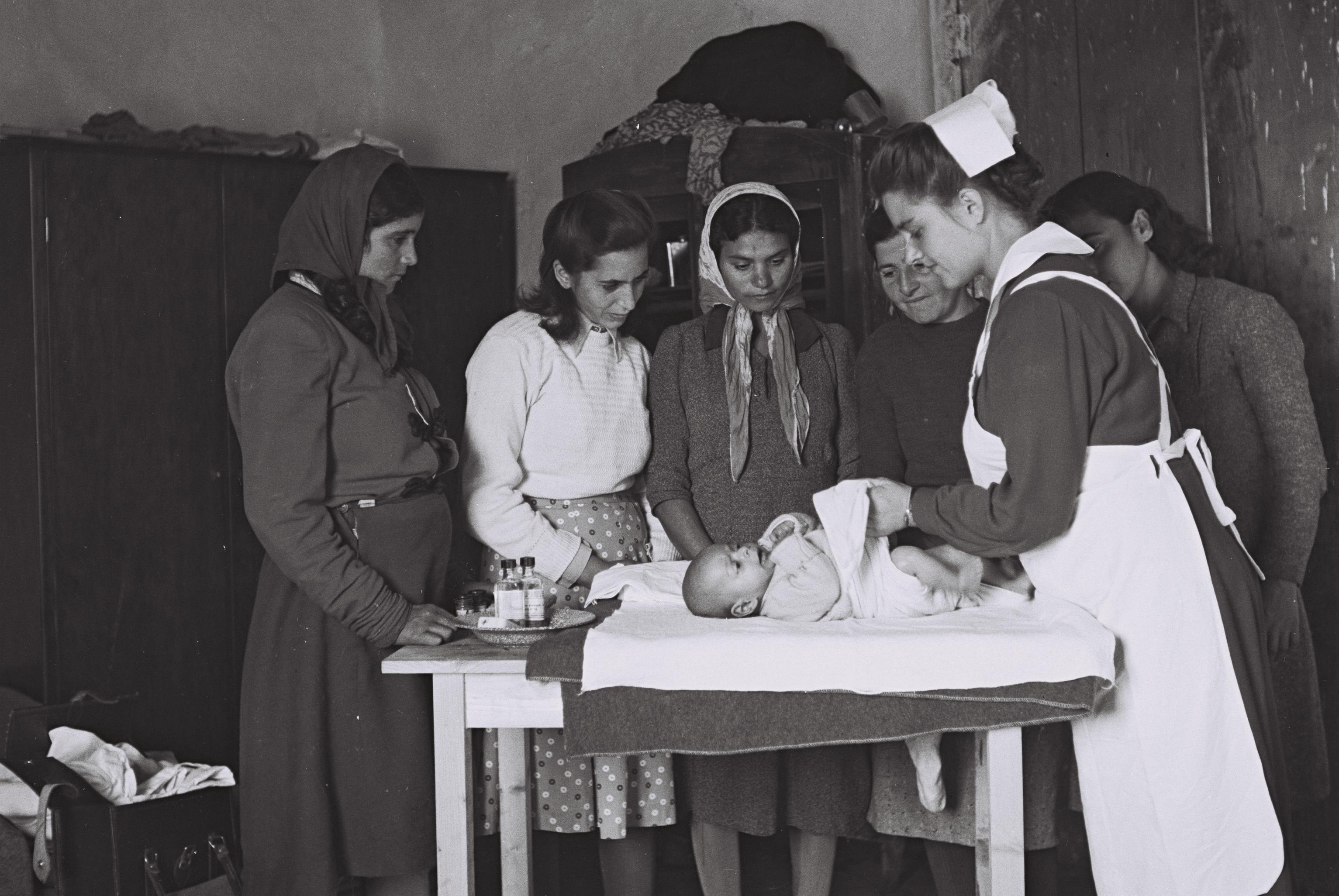
A nurse in Yehud demonstrating to young immigrant mothers how to diaper their babies, 1950

Tipat Halav (Hebrew: טיפת חלב, lit. 'a drop of milk') is a network of primary healthcare centers in Israel. The centers provide post-natal well-baby and early childhood care to children across the county through the age of six. They offer well-baby checkups and vaccinations. The centers monitor children for developmental issues and public health concerns, as part of an effort to prevent childhood disease and mortality. New and prospective parents are also given assistance in learning about breastfeeding and child care, as well as to detect post-partum depression and domestic violence. The efforts of Tipat Halav resulted in a decline of more than 50% in infant mortality in pre-state Israel to among the world's lowest levels.

== History ==
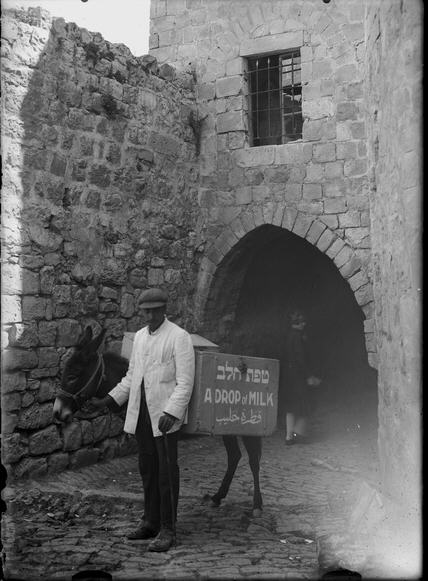
A man with a donkey in Jerusalem, 1927. The bag on the donkey reads "A Drop of Milk" in Hebrew, English, and Arabic.

In 1909, Henrietta Szold came to Jerusalem, where she observed extremely high levels of disease and infant mortality in the Yishuv, which was then under the control of the Ottoman Empire. After witnessing the squalor and disease, including mothers too weak to shoo flies from their children's eyes, Szold established what became the Hadassah Women's Zionist Organization of America. Szold realized that the best way to deal with conditions was to provide preventive care, bringing public health workers from the United States to serve the residents.

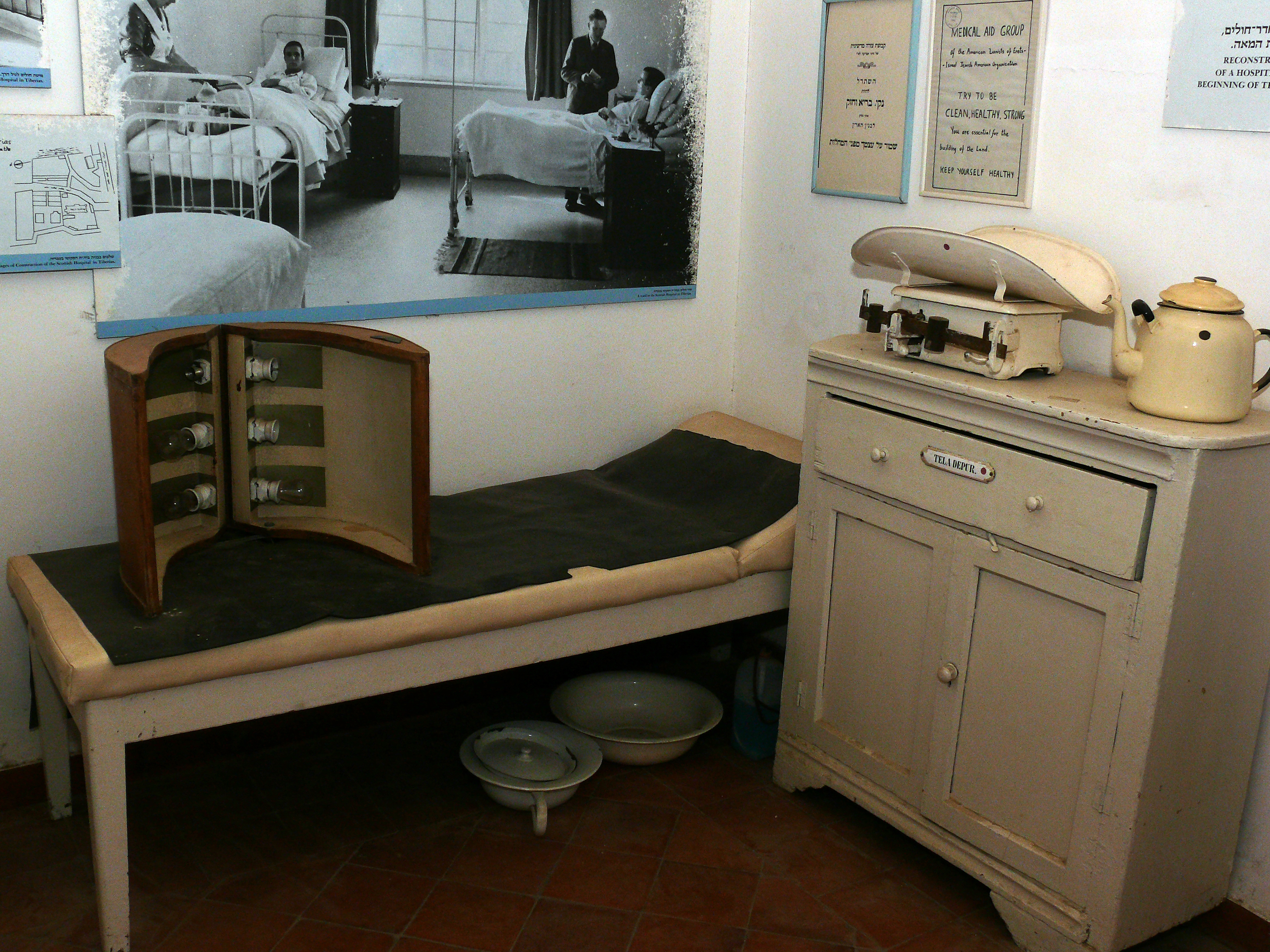
Tipat Halav room in a museum

Building on models that had been developed by other organizations, American nurse Bertha Landsman helped establish the first Tipat Halav center in the Old City of Jerusalem in 1921. Since contaminated milk was a common cause of infant mortality, the centers taught mothers to breastfeed, and distributed healthy milk and taught parents how to pasteurize milk on their own. Physician Helena Kagan established Baby Welfare Clinics that provided milk and medical care, and later became part of Tipat Halav, serving Jewish and Arab children in Jerusalem.

Tipat Halav was named for La Goutte de lait, a network of similar centers established in France in 1894 whose name also translates as "a drop of milk". The French phrase originates from the line "Une goutte de lait à l'enfant nouveau-né" in a poem by Alfred de Musset.

Because many mothers were initially reluctant to visit Tipat Halav, outreach efforts provided diapers as an incentive for mothers to bring their babies for care. As the program expanded, new centers were constructed to serve the Arab population. Early deliveries of pasteurized milk were made using donkey carts. Mothers were handed flyers emphasizing that "It is easier to maintain a healthy baby than cure a sick one."

In 1924, the American businessman and philanthropist Nathan Straus contributed $10,000 to Hadassah. This funding was used to create a nationwide network of infant care centers. Strauss had been an advocate for pasteurized milk in New York City. One center funded by Straus, described as a "friend of the children all over the world", targeted at Arab neighborhoods in Jerusalem and was "dedicated to meet the needs of Moslem women in particular, for all babies are dear to Mr. Straus' heart."

By the early 1940s, the efforts of Tipat Halav had reduced infant mortality rates to levels comparable to those in Europe. Infant mortality rates that were cut from 108 per 1,000 live births in 1927 to 48 per 1,000 by 1948, one of the lowest in the world. After the establishment of the State of Israel in 1948, Tipat Halav centers run by Hadassah were transferred to the government.

Around 2010, the Israel Ministry of Health, as part of an effort to improve efficiency in the provision of child care, divided up control of the 900 Tipat Halav centers nationwide. Half were run by the four state-mandated health service organizations, more than 40% by the government and about 5% by the cities of Jerusalem (with 34 clinics) and Tel Aviv (with 15).
