= Helena Kagan =

Israeli pediatrician (1889-1978)

Helena S. Kagan
- הלנה כגן
- Dr. Helena S. Kagan (right) and her sister-in-law, Rachel (Cohen) Kagan (left)
- Born: September 25, 1889; Tashkent, Uzbekistan
- Died: August 22, 1978 (aged 88); Jerusalem, Israel
- Other names: Helena Hauser
- Occupation: physician
- Known for: Israel Prize

Helena Kagan (Hebrew: הלנה כגן; September 25, 1889, Tashkent, Uzbekistan – August 22, 1978, Jerusalem) was a physician, an Israeli pioneer in pediatrics, active in Jerusalem. She was responsible for the expansion of health care in Israel. Working under the auspices of the Hadassah organization, she gave treatment to generations of local children regardless of their parents' religious affiliation.

== Biography ==
Helena Kagan was born in Tashkent, Uzbekistan, to Moshe and Miriam Kagan, a Jewish couple from Riga. They also had one son named Noach. When her father, an engineer, refused to convert to Christianity he lost his job. However, her parents managed to pay the school tuition for Helena and her older brother, and they graduated in 1905.

Kagan studied piano at the Musikschule Konservatorium Bern and Medicine at the University of Bern, graduating in 1910, and specializing in Bern as a paediatrician.

In 1936, Kagan married Emil Hauser, a violinist who was a member of the Budapest String Quartet and founded the Palestine Conservatory of Music in Jerusalem. Kagan died on August 22, 1978.

== Medical career ==
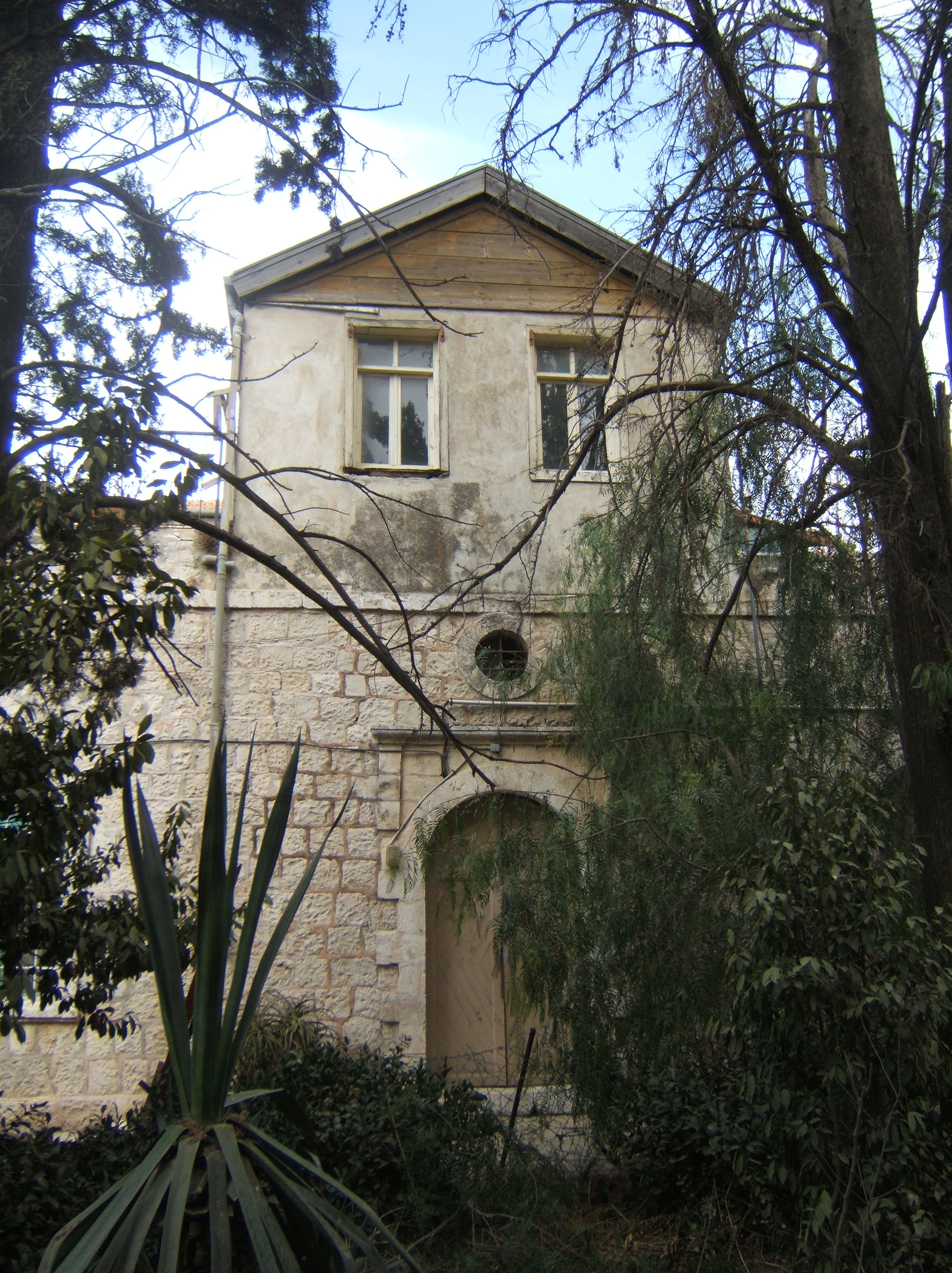
Home of Helena Kagan, Street of the Prophets, Jerusalem

In the spring of 1914, Kagan, moved to Jerusalem. Unable to obtain a license to practice medicine, decided to open a clinic at her home, teaching young Arab and Jewish women to become nurses and midwives.

In 1916, after the last two male physicians were expelled from the city by the Ottoman authorities, and playing a decisive role in containing a cholera epidemic, Kagan was granted an honorary license and started to work at a small children's hospital, becoming the first pediatrician in the country and the only female physician in the Ottoman Empire, running the hospital as the head of its pediatrics wing until 1925. After this, she started working in 1925 at the Infants Home for Arab Children in the Old City of Jerusalem, where she served as medical director until 1948. Also, she was one of the founders of the Histadrut Nashim Ivriot (Hebrew Women's Organization), which became the local chapter of WIZO.

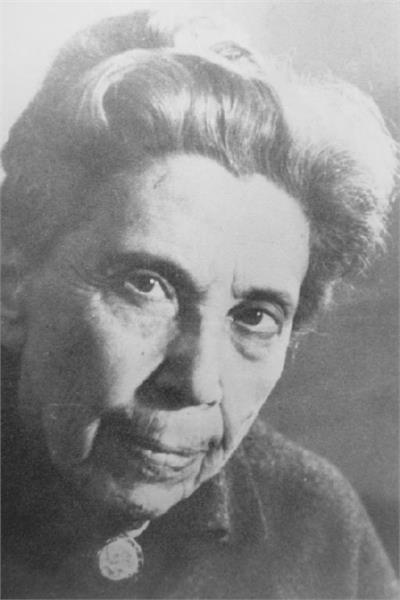
Helena Kagan 1930

Kagan established the Israel Pediatrics Association in 1927. In the same year, she opened a shelter for homeless children, and a health center in the Old City of Jerusalem for working mothers, the precursor to those known today as Tipat Halav. In 1936, she established the pediatrics department of the Bikur Cholim Hospital in Jerusalem, which she headed until 1975. In 1947, she was elected member of the Board of Trustees of the Hebrew University, becoming its vice-chairwoman in 1965.

== Awards and recognition ==
She was awarded the Israel Prize in 1975 for the special contribution to society and the state in community service. The pediatric department of Bikur Holim Hospital and a community center in Katamonim, Jerusalem, bear her name since 1962 and 1968 respectively. In her later years, Kagan worked as adviser to the Ministry of Health while keeping the pediatric consulting work at home.

== See also ==
- List of Israel Prize recipients
- Health care in Israel
