= 2024 Kiryat Malakhi attack =

Palestinian shooting attack in Israel

- Part of the Israeli–Palestinian conflict
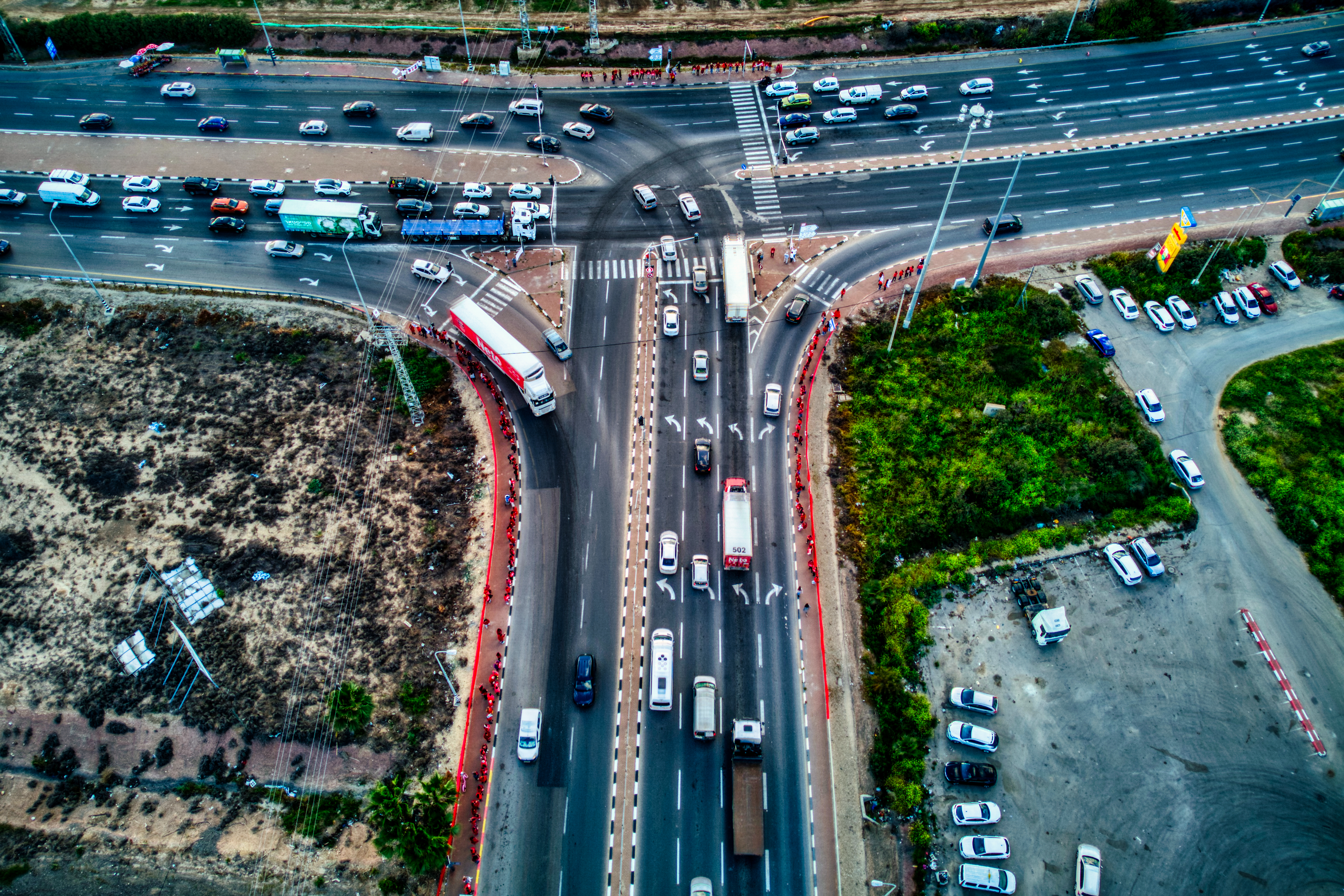
- Re'em intersection

- The attack site
- Location: 31.7602110°N 34.7856330°E; Re'em Junction, Highway 40, Kiryat Malakhi, Israel
- Date: 16 February 2024; 12:30
- Attack type: Mass shooting
- Weapon: Pistol
- Deaths: 2 (+1 attacker)
- Injuries: 4
- Assailant: Fadi Jamjoum
- Motive: Reaction to the Israeli invasion of the Gaza Strip

On 16 February 2024, a mass shooting took place at a bus station at the Re'em Junction along Highway 40 in Kiryat Malakhi, a city in Southern District, Israel. Two people were killed and four injured, with the shooter killed by an off-duty Israel Defense Force (IDF) reservist at the scene.

== Attack ==
Shortly after 12:30 pm, the shooter arrived at a bus station in Re'em Junction on Highway 40, near Kiryat Malakhi, in a stolen vehicle. He then opened fire at civilians waiting at the bus stop with a handgun. Six people were shot.

Magen David Adom paramedics evacuated the victims to the two nearest hospitals: Kaplan Medical Center in Rehovot and Assuta Ashdod Medical Center in Ashdod. Kaplan Medical Center later announced that one victim died at the scene, while another was evacuated in serious condition and died at the hospital. The Magen David Adom stated that two of the four injured were in serious condition, and the other two were in moderate condition.

An off-duty IDF reservist who was driving near the scene heard gunshots, and stopped at a gas station. He then loaded his gun and fatally shot the attacker. An eyewitness said they saw him open fire on the shooter about a minute and a half after the attack began.

== Assailant ==
Haaretz initially identified the shooter as a Palestinian from East Jerusalem; the Shin Bet intelligence service later identified the assailant as Fadi Jamjoum, a 37-year-old resident of the Shu'fat Palestinian refugee camp in East Jerusalem, who held an Israeli identity card. Police determined he acted alone.

== Aftermath ==
Clashes broke out in Shuafat between Israel Police forces and residents as Police reportedly headed for Jamjoun's house. Residents threw stones and Molotov cocktails at police officers, who responded using "riot dispersal means".

Doron Turgeman, Israel Police commander of the Jerusalem district, ordered the destruction of Jamjoun's home. After receiving a warrant, police officers cleared the home of Jamjoun's family before sealing it.

== Reactions ==
=== Domestic ===
Following the attack, Prime Minister of Israel Benjamin Netanyahu issued a statement in which he sent condolences to the families affected, and said that the "attack reminds us that the whole country is a front and that the murderers, who come not only from Gaza, want to kill us all. We will continue to fight until complete victory with all our strength, on every front, everywhere, until we restore security and peace to all citizens of Israel".

=== Palestinian groups ===
Hamas praised the attack and said it was a natural response to Gaza war, and called for more Palestinians to take up arms.

Palestinian Islamic Jihad said the attack was a response to Israel's war in Gaza.

Fatah hailed the attack, calling it a "heroic operation in the occupied territories". However, Palestinian Authority President Mahmoud Abbas, who also headed the Fatah movement, denounces the statement. His office added “The president is against violence and against terror attacks”.

=== International ===
United States Ambassador to Israel Jack Lew said he was appalled by the attack and offered condolences to the families affected.

== See also ==
- Palestinian political violence
- Violent incidents in reaction to the Gaza war
  - 2023 Givat Shaul shooting
  - 2024 Ra'anana attack
  - 2024 Eli shooting
