= Yehuda Melamed =

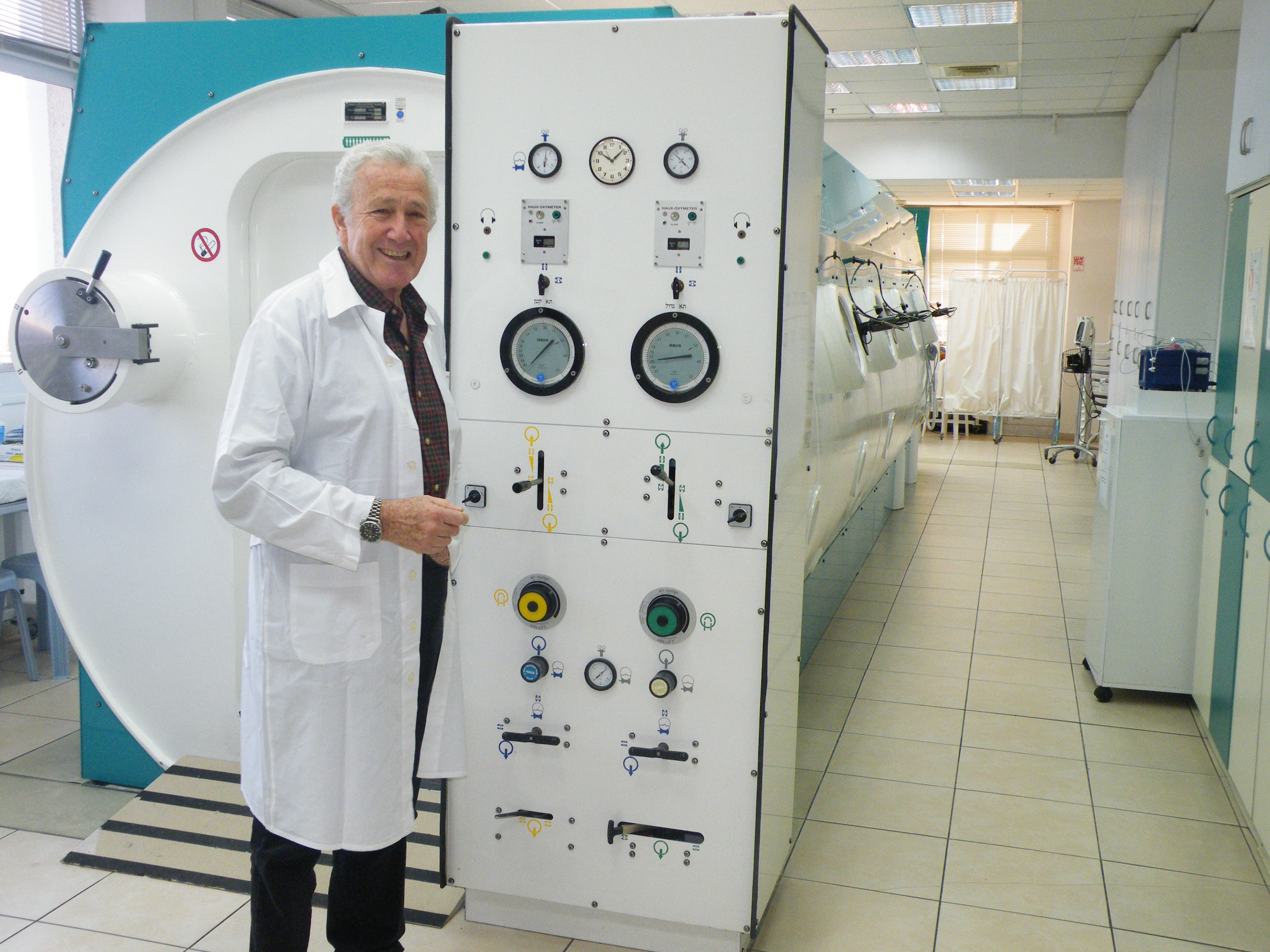
Yehuda Melamed in front of Hyperbaric chamber at Elisha Medical Center 2010

Yehuda Melamed (Hebrew: יהודה מלמד; born 17 Feb 1943, Rehovot) is an Israeli physician specialized in the fields of diving medicine and hyperbaric medicine. He is the founder of the first hyperbaric medical centers in the Israeli Navy, Rambam Medical Center and Elisha Medical Center in Haifa, the hyperbaric medical center in Asaf Harofe Hospital in Tzrifin, and together with Dr Hertz, the recompression chamber in Yoseftal Medical center.

== Career ==
Melamed is a member and official physician of the Underwater Exploration Society of Israel (Hebrew: האגודה למחקר תת-ימי בישראל), responsible for safety and the prevention of diving accidents. The initial treatment of diving injuries in Sinai, from 1974 to 1982, which he instituted and supervised, entailed evacuation of the casualty in a transportable recompression rescue chamber to the large multiplace Navy hyperbaric chamber in Haifa, and later in Eilat.

After Yom Kippur War in 1973, Melamed continued in full-time military service in the commando unit of the Israeli Navy Shayetet 13 as a physician, and founded and was appointed Director of the Israel Naval Medical Institute (INMI) (Hebrew: המכון לרפואה ימית), which he led for 20 years until he retired in 1995 with the rank of Captain (Navy).

=== Certification ===
Melamed was certified as a Diving Physician by the Israeli and U.S. Navies. He obtained the degree of Specialist in Diving and Hyperbaric Medicine from the Medical School at Chieti University in Italy.

== Hyperbaric Medicine in Israel ==
As Commanding Officer of the Israel Naval Medical Institute together with Shimon Burshtein, Head of the Intensive Care Unit at Rambam Health Care Campus, he cooperated with the Ministry of Health to extend hyperbaric oxygen treatment (HBOT) to patients with medical indications not related to diving.

In 1982, the Ministry recognized the INMI, in cooperation with Rambam, under Melamed's management, as The National Institute for Diving and Hyperbaric Medicine. Fifteen medical indications for HBOT were officially registered and authorized for the first time in Israel, and in 1994 were included in the ‘basket of services’ under the National Health Law.

=== Gallery ===
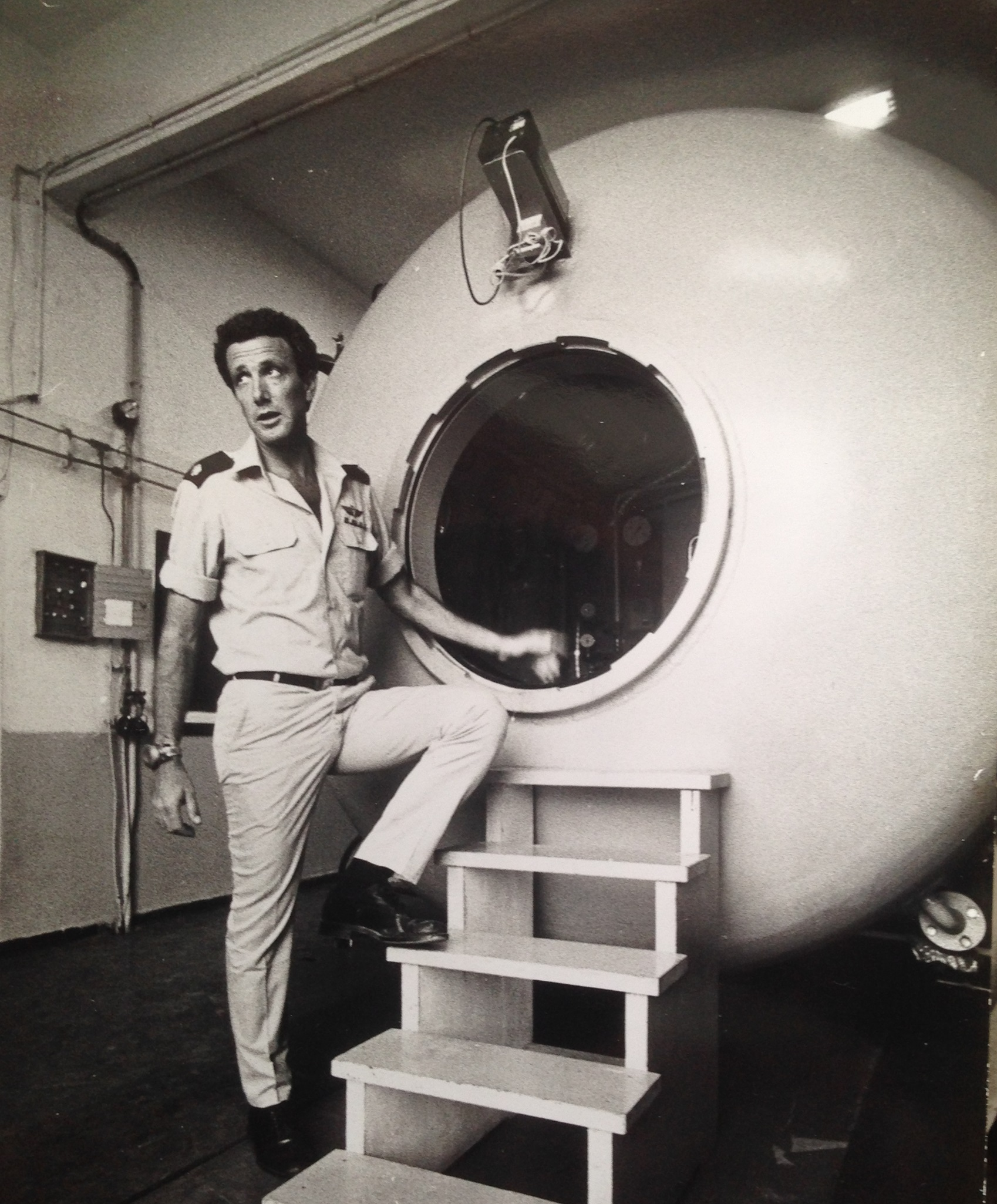
Dr Melamed in front of the first recompression chamber of Israel Navy, 1978.

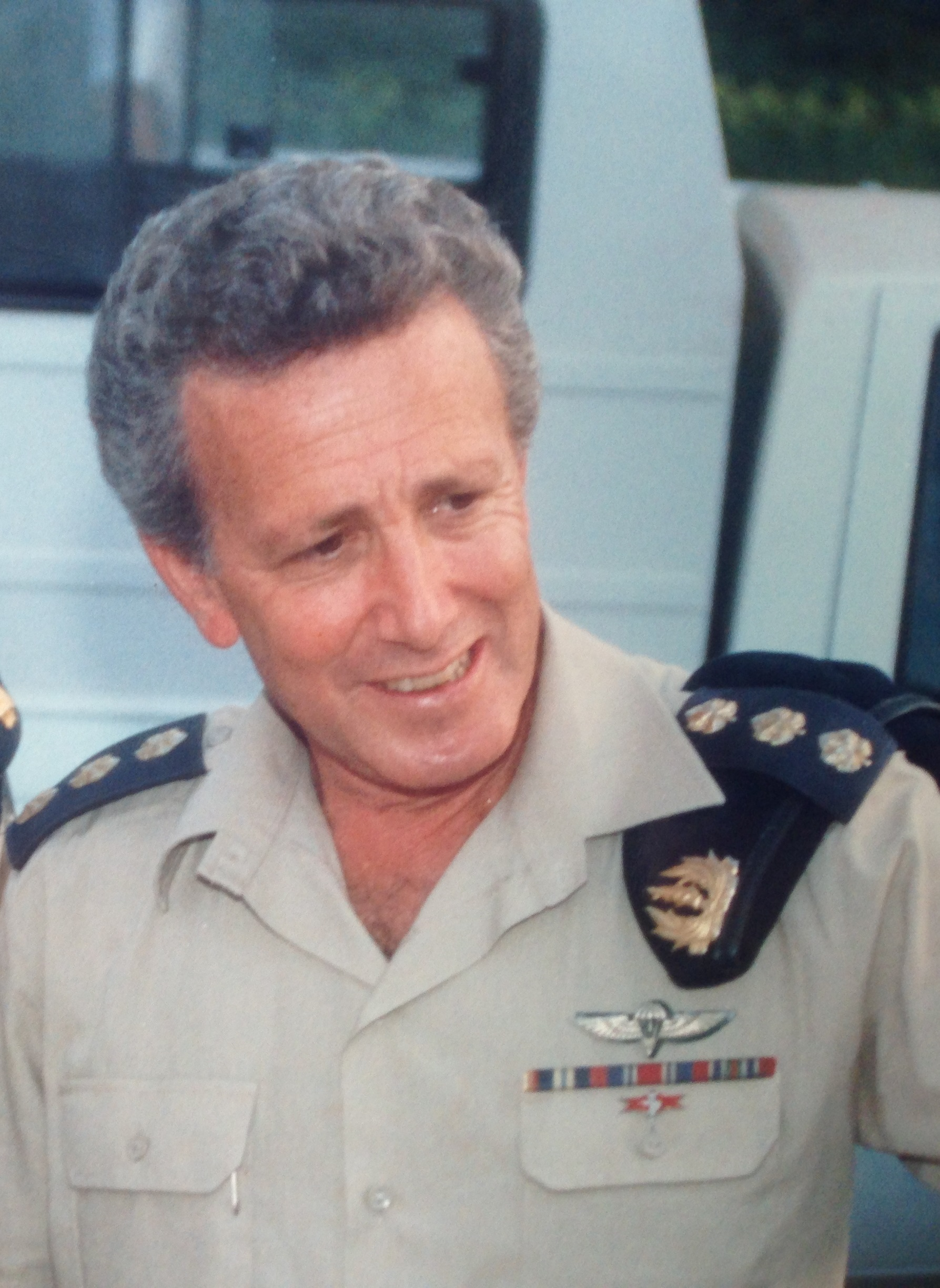
Capt Yehuda Melamed IN, 1992.

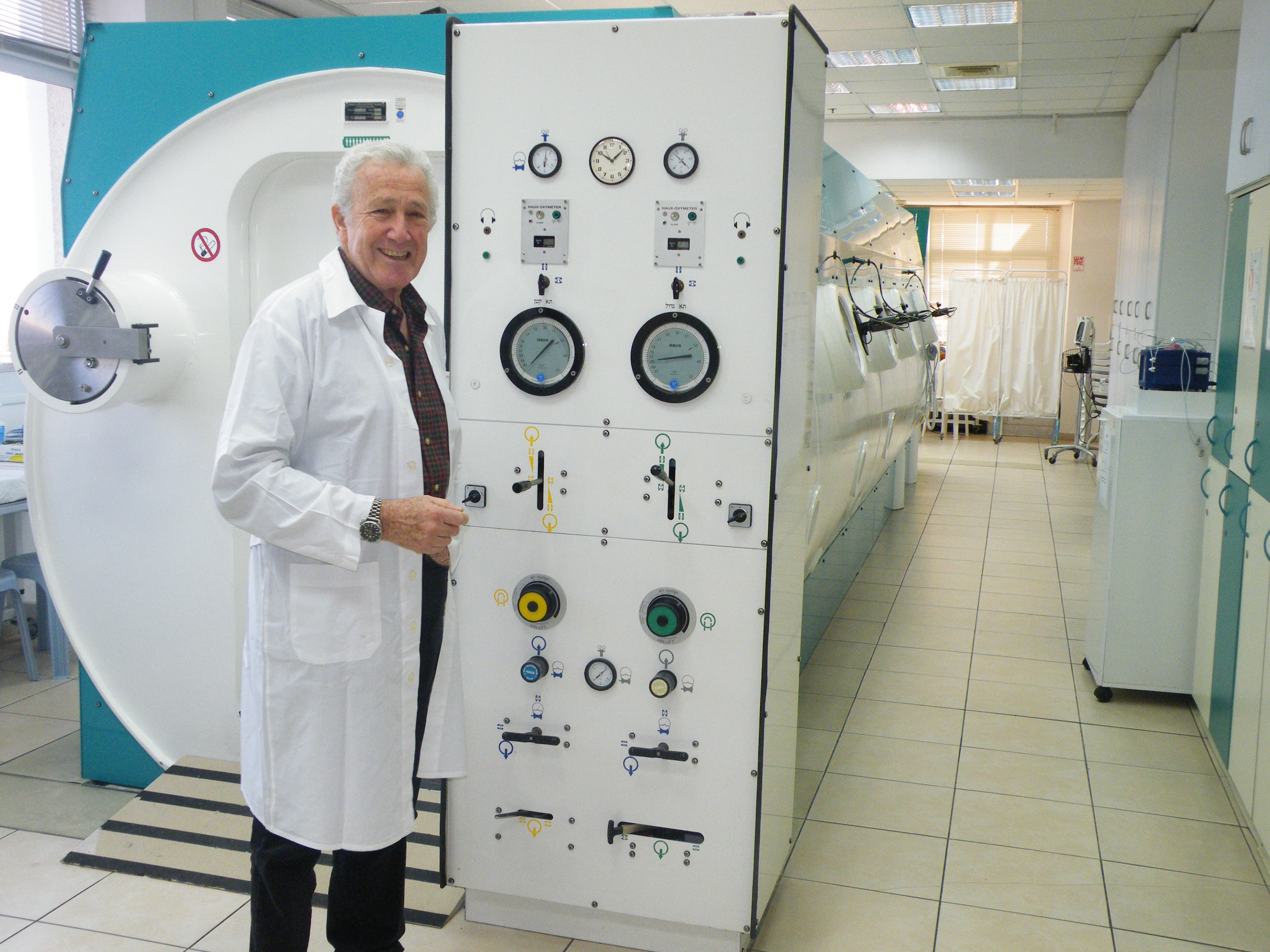
Dr Melamed in front of the Elisha Hospital recompression chamber 2012.

== Prizes and recognition ==
- 1990: Melamed received the Excellence in Diving Medicine Award from the Undersea and Hyperbaric Medical Society (UHMS).

== Publications ==
Dr. Melamed has published research and clinical articles in scientific medical literature.
