= HMC =

HMC may stand for:

== Education ==
- Harvey Mudd College, Claremont, California, US
- Headmasters' and Headmistresses' Conference, UK organisation of independent fee-charging schools
- Harvard Model Congress, congressional simulation conference
- Harris Manchester College, Oxford, a constituent college of the University of Oxford

== Companies ==
- Hamad Medical Corporation, Qatar
- Harvard Management Company, manages Harvard University endowment
- Heerema Marine Contractors, The Netherlands
- Hero Motors Company, of India
- HM Consolidated, of Australia, the parent company of Nexus Airlines
- Holyoke Machine Company, defunct, United States
- Honda Motor Company, of Japan, NYSE symbol
- Hornady Manufacturing Company (cartridge headstamp)
- Hyundai Motor Company, of Republic Of Korea

== Transport ==
- Hamamatsuchō Station, JR East station code
- Hampton Court railway station, the terminus of the Hampton Court Branch Line in Surrey, SW of London

== Other ==
- Chief Hospital corpsman, a United States Navy rate
- Half Mini Card, a physical specification of the PCI Express Mini Card
- Hardware Management Console, a computer technology provided by IBM
- His/Her Majesty's Cutter, UK Customs ship prefix since 2005
- Herzliya Medical Center, Herzliya, Israel
- Holocaust Memorial Center
- Holyoke Medical Center
- Hybrid Memory Cube, a computer memory (RAM) technology
- Royal Commission on Historical Manuscripts, or Historical Manuscripts Commission
- Hamiltonian Monte Carlo
