= 2008 Israeli tour bus crash =

Road accident in Israel

Details
- Date: 16 December 2008
- Location: Israel

Statistics
- Deaths: 25
- Injured: 33

The 2008 Israeli tour bus crash was a road accident in southern Israel on 16 December 2008 in which a coach carrying Russian tour operators left the road and plunged into a ravine, killing 25. It is the deadliest traffic accident in Israel's history.

== The crash ==
The coach was carrying 60 passengers, a group of Russian tour operators from St Petersburg, from Ovda International Airport to the holiday resort of Eilat. The accident occurred when the bus driver, Edward Gelfond, attempted to overtake another bus on a steep, winding stretch of the road. The bus crashed through the roadside safety barrier and fell 60 metres down a slope, turning over several times.

Initially, it was reported that 24 passengers had died; the figure later rose to 25. Another 33 people were injured, including 23 in serious condition, and were taken to Soroka Medical Center in Beersheba, Yoseftal Medical Center in Eilat and Hadassah Medical Center in Jerusalem.

== Cause ==
Gelfond, who survived the crash, claimed that something fell on him, causing him to lose control, though Minister of Transport and Road Safety Shaul Mofaz stated that there was a dispute between the two drivers and that the accident "was the result of the drivers' thuggery." However, the second bus driver Rami Vazana has claimed there was no dispute, and that Gelfond had just been attempting to overtake him. Israel Police have stated that it is too soon to place the blame on a dispute between the two bus drivers. It was later revealed that Gelfond had 22 prior traffic convictions, whilst initial reports suggested that he was speeding at the time of the accident, claims which Gelfond denied. Investigators discovered that the coach's tachograph was missing the disc used to record speed.

Gelfond was arrested immediately after being released from hospital. On 14 July 2009 he was charged with manslaughter, and in 2014 was sentenced to 8 years in prison.

== Reaction ==
Israeli Prime Minister, Ehud Olmert, expressed sorrow over the "horrific outcome". He and Foreign Minister Tzipi Livni conveyed condolences to the victims' families. A special emergency hotline began operating at the Jewish community center in St. Petersburg, and the Jewish Agency contacted the Russian embassy in Israel and offered to provide whatever assistance required by the families. The Foreign Ministry and the Israeli Tourism Ministry began operating a situation room aimed at facilitating the communication with the Russian embassy in Israel and the Russian government. Two Russian government planes took off to Israel, one carrying the victims' families and the other carrying doctors, medical equipment, psychologists and rescue teams.
