= Jerusalem hospital =

Jerusalem hospital may refer to:

- the medieval hospice in Jerusalem rebuilt by the Knights Hospitaller, see Muristan
- any hospital in Jerusalem, see List of hospitals in Israel#Jerusalem
