= Ben-Zion Harel =

Israeli doctor and politician

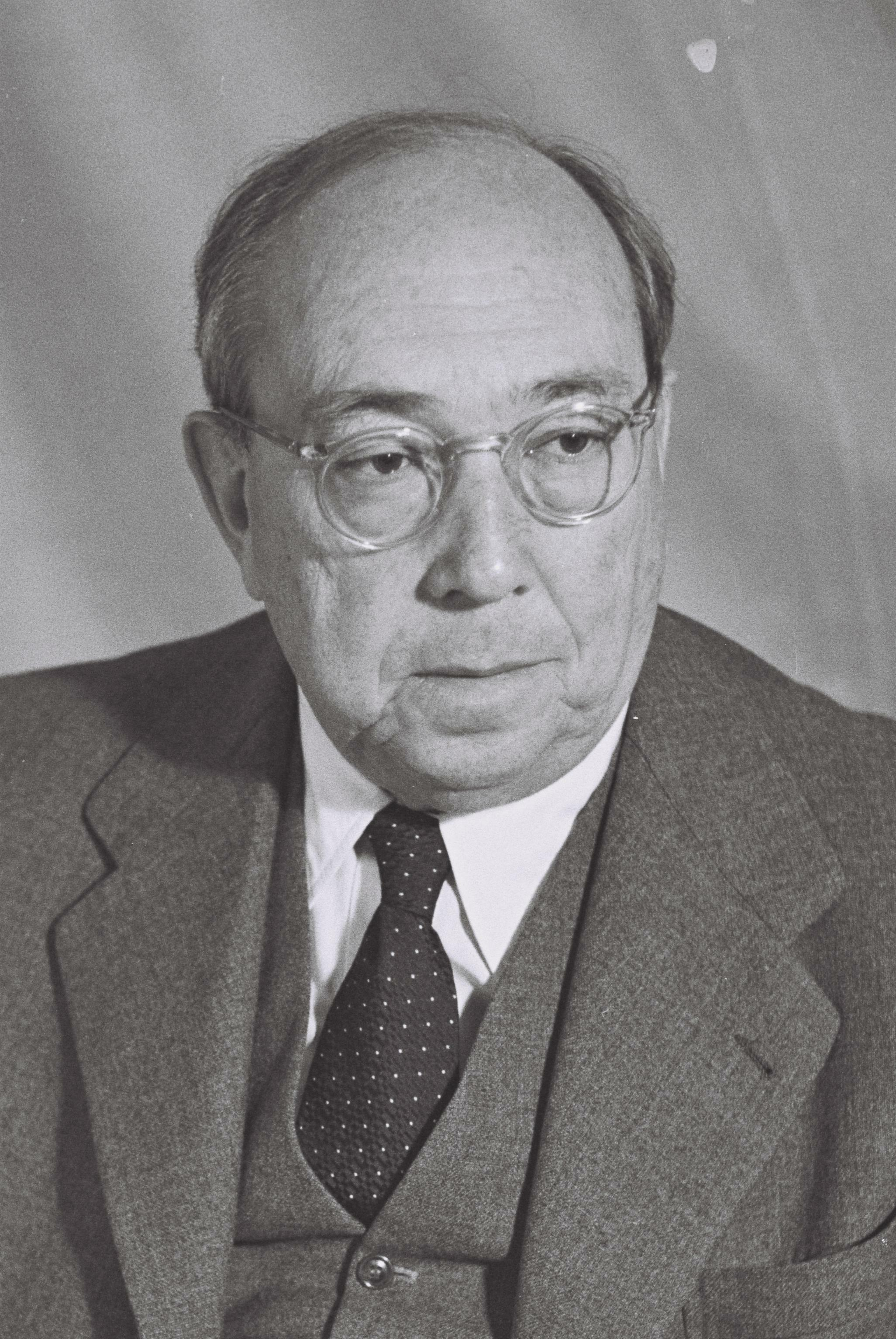
- Harel in 1951

Faction represented in the Knesset
- 1951–1959: General Zionists

Personal details
- Born: 3 June 1892 Kuldīga, Russian Empire
- Died: 19 September 1972 (aged 80)

Ben-Zion Harel (Hebrew: בן-ציון הראל; 3 June 1892 – 19 September 1972) was an Israeli doctor and politician, who served as a member of the Knesset for the General Zionists between 1951 and 1959.

== Biography ==
Born Ben-Zion Hirshowitz in Kuldīga in the Russian Empire (today in Latvia), Harel was educated at a heder and high school, before moving to Switzerland to attend university. He studied chemistry at the University of Zurich, and medicine at the University of Bern, graduating as a doctor in 1916.

In 1921 he emigrated to Mandatory Palestine, and from 1922 until 1934 worked as a doctor in kibbutz Ein Harod. He established and served as director of the Jezreel Valley central hospital, and was the head doctor at Kupat Holim in the north of the country. In 1935 he became chairman of the Land of Israel Physicians Association, and the following year helped establish Assuta hospital in Tel Aviv.

Between 1940 and 1941 he was placed in charge of Emergency Health Affairs by the Jewish National Council. Following independence in 1948, he served as director general of the Ministry of Health until 1950, also helping to establish Elisha Hospital in Haifa. Prior to the 1951 Knesset elections he was placed tenth on the General Zionists list, and was elected as the party won 20 seats. He was re-elected in 1955, but did not stand for the party in the 1959 elections. He died in 1972 at the age of 80.

== See also ==
- Health care in Israel
