= Assuta Ashdod Medical Center =

Hospital in Ashdod, Israel

Samson Assuta Ashdod Medical Center

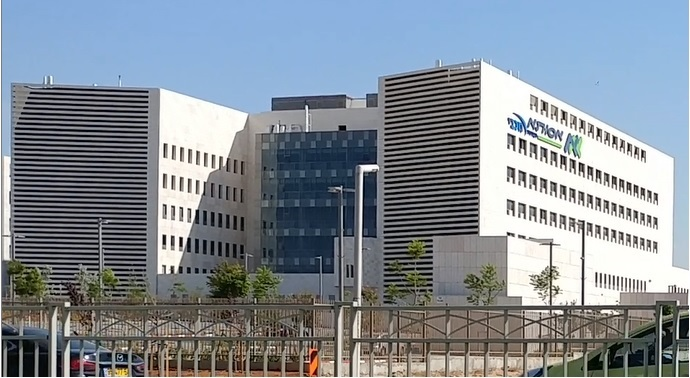

Geography
- Location: Ashdod, Israel
- Coordinates: 31°46′49″N 34°39′26″E

Organisation
- Type: General Hospital
- Affiliated university: Ben-Gurion University of the Negev

Services
- Emergency department: Yes
- Beds: 300

History
- Founded: June 4, 2017; 9 years ago

Links
- Website: www.assutaashdod.co.il
- Lists: Hospitals in Israel

Samson Assuta Ashdod Medical Center is a general hospital in Ashdod, Israel. It began operation on June 4, 2017, and was opened in stages, assuming full operation in November 2017. The hospital has 300 beds and serves the population of Ashdod and its suburbs. It is named after Eric and Sheila Samson.

A 2026 study praised the hospital for its application of extreme disaster response protocols during and following the October 7th attacks.

== History ==
For decades the local government of Ashdod struggled to establish a public hospital. Ashdod residents in need of hospitalization needed to travel to Kaplan Medical Center in Rehovot or Barzilai Medical Center in Ashkelon. In 2002 the Knesset accepted a law proposed by MK Sofa Landver which forced the state to build the hospital. However the tender was released only in 2009. Despite multiple objections the tender was won by Assuta (a subsidiary of Maccabi Healthcare Services).

Assuta Ashdod has partnered with Ben Gurion University's Medical School to train Israel's next generation of doctors.

The hospital is fully prepared for security crises, including terrorist incidents and rocket attacks. It became a critical frontline facility after the Hamas attacks on October 7th. According to the hospital, which is located 16 miles from Gaza, hundreds of injured soldiers and civilians were treated there, with a “96% survival rate."

Its “bomb-shelter” design with thick concrete walls offers extensive protection, with no need to move patients from operating rooms, ICU, inpatient wards, and other critical areas in the event of a missile attack.

Assuta Ashdod is Israel's first eco-friendly hospital, meeting standards for green construction and operations.

== See also ==
- Healthcare in Israel
