= ALYN Hospital =

Coordinates: 31.768716°N 35.168669°E

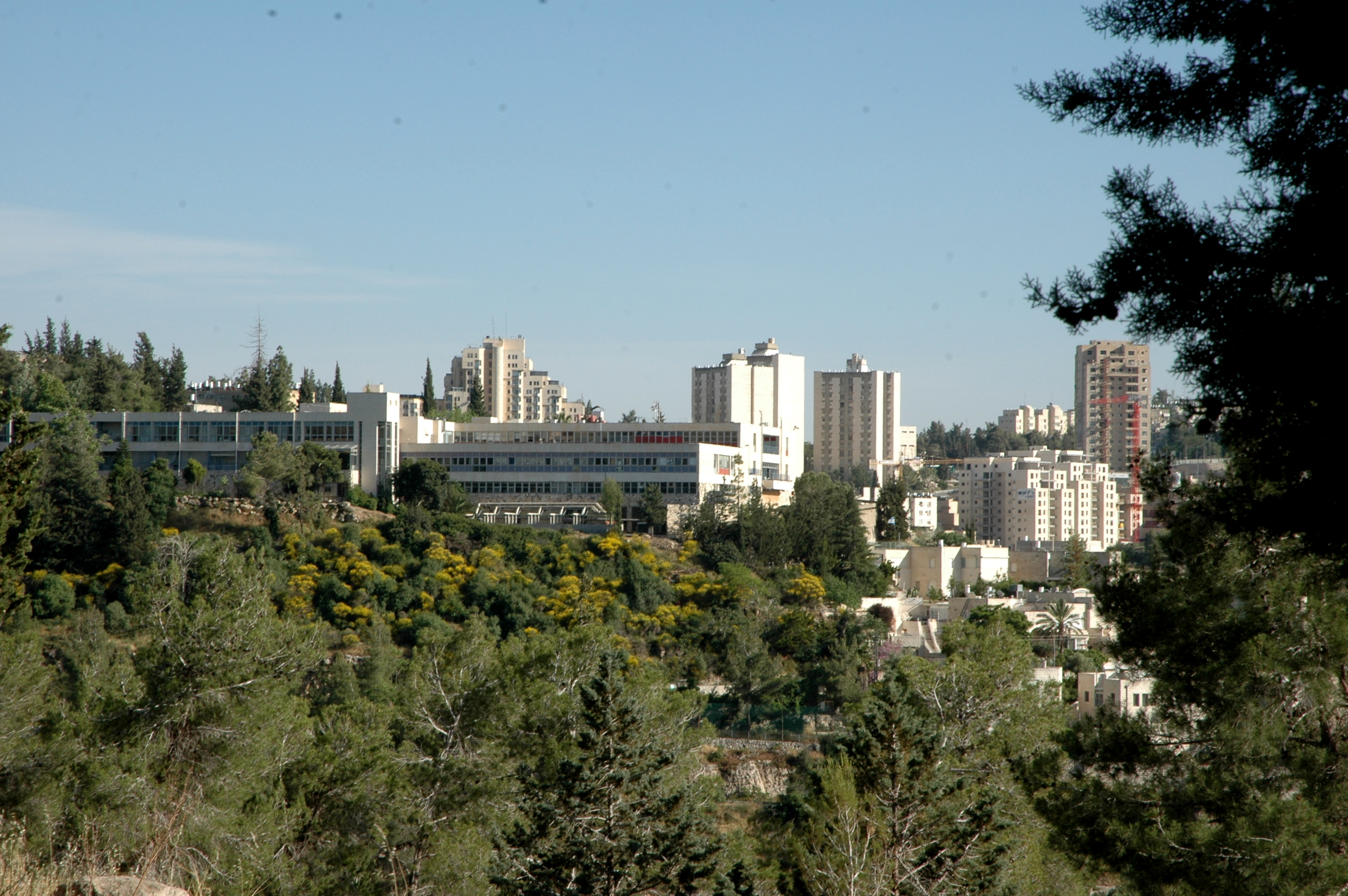

Geography
- Location: Jerusalem

History
- Opened: 1932

Links
- Website: http://www.alyn.org

ALYN Hospital (Hebrew: בית חולים אלין) is a comprehensive rehabilitation center for physically challenged and disabled children, adolescents and young adults, located in Jerusalem. ALYN Hospital is a private, nonprofit facility and treats all patients, regardless of religious belief, nationality or ethnic background.

== History ==
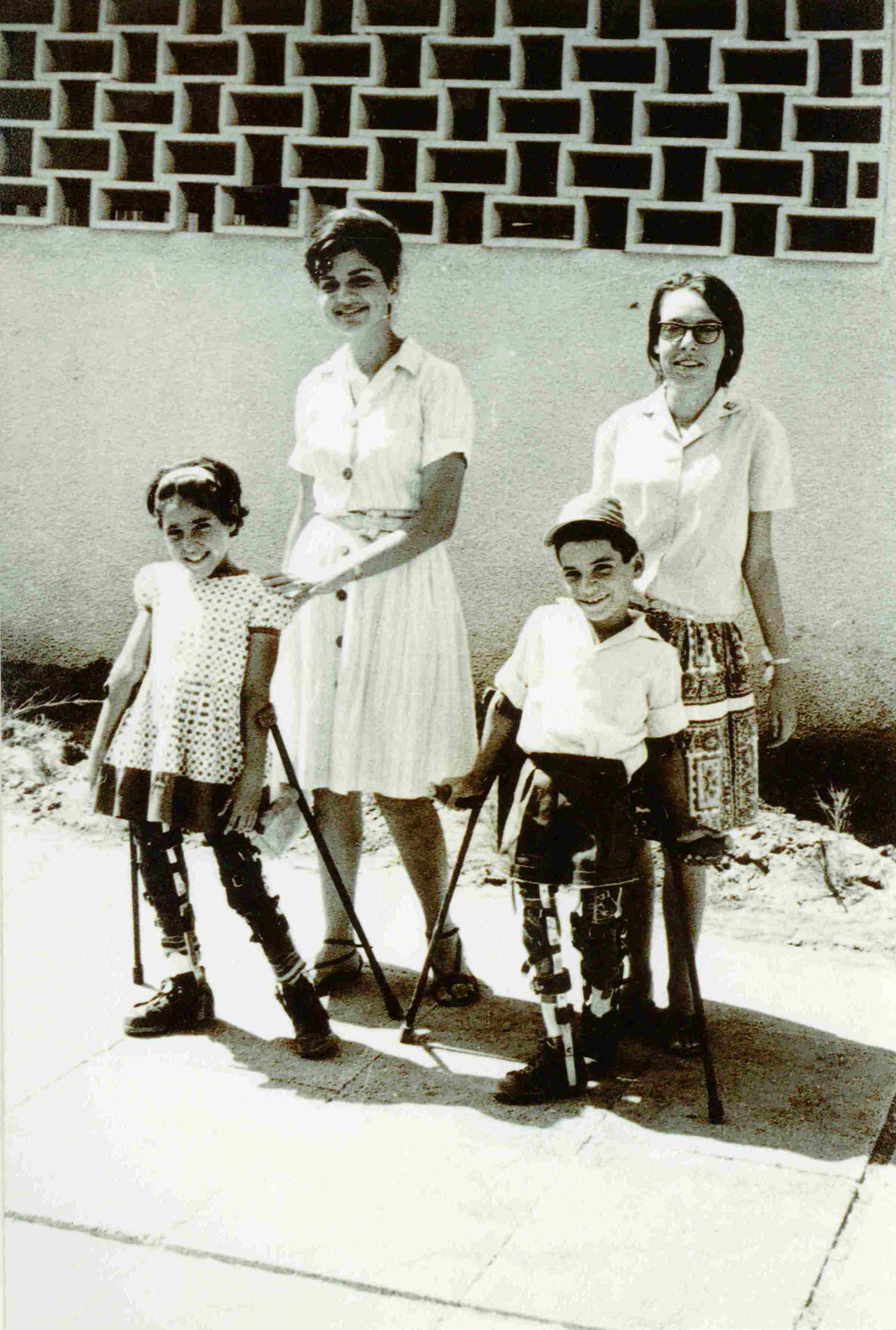
Alyn day camp, 1965

ALYN Hospital was founded in 1932 by an American orthopedist, Dr. Henry Keller, who dedicated his life to voluntary work amongst physically challenged children in Jerusalem.

Following a polio epidemic in Israel in the 1940s and 1950s, the Ministry of Health provided ALYN with an old monastery building in Katamon that was used as a treatment center, residence and school for 200 children suffering polio.

In 1971, a donation by Malcolm and Dorothy Woldenberg made possible the building in the Kiryat Yovel neighborhood of Jerusalem of the ALYN Woldenberg Family Hospital, a modern hospital and rehabilitation facility.

Today, ALYN Hospital is one of the world's leading hospitals specializing in the active and intensive rehabilitation of children who are afflicted with a broad range of physical disabilities.

== Departments ==
The hospital operates the following departments:

The Rehabilitation Department treats patients ranging in age from babies to young adults and suffering from injuries sustained in road and domestic accidents and terror attacks, severe burns, various feeding disorders, congenital or progressive muscle, nerve and bone diseases, severe respiratory disorders, or those requiring rehabilitation after orthopedic and neurosurgical procedures, or a period of rehabilitation treatment for whatever reason.

The Day Hospitalization Rehabilitation Unit provides treatment for patients who still require comprehensive rehabilitation but are already able to return to their home. Patients continue with day hospitalization after being discharged from the Rehabilitation Unit's hospital ward or they are referred from other sources, such as clinics.

The intensive care Respiratory Rehabilitation Unit treats patients so as to wean them off artificial ventilation, achieve the best possible regulation of ventilation for patients who need continued ventilation and determine correct ventilation treatment for patients with respiratory failure.

The Shachar Rehabilitation Educational Medical Day Care Center provides an educational framework for children who have rehabilitation and medical needs and whose medical condition needs to improve before they can be reintegrated into the community. The center includes a pre-school day care center for children aged 6 months to 3 years, kindergartens, an after-school integration program and school classes. It provides services including occupational therapy, physiotherapy, hydrotherapy, speech therapy, and psychological counseling in addition to support by medical specialists and social workers.

== Charity Bike Ride ==
“Wheels of Love” is ALYN's annual charity bike ride through Israel to raise money for the children at the hospital. It is a five-day, 480 kilometres (300 mi) bike ride that attracts cyclists from all around the world. “Wheels of Love” has routes designed to accommodate a variety of riding and intensity levels: Off-Road, On-Road, On-Road Challenge and Touring.

Wheels of Love began in 1999 with 9 Israelis who cycled through Israel and raised approximately $65,000 for ALYN Hospital. In 2007, more than $3,000,000 was raised. In the fall of 2009, ALYN Hospital hosted its 10th Annual Wheels of Love Charity Bike Ride. The ride attracted 370 international riders, 250 Israeli one-day riders and 35 volunteers from around the world, making it Israel's largest charity sporting event.

== Christopher Reeve's visit ==
In July 2003, Christopher Reeve, an actor, advocate and chairman of the Christopher Reeve Paralysis Foundation (CRPF), visited Israel to learn about their work with stem cell research. During his intensive tour, Reeve visited ALYN Hospital, the Weizmann Institute of Science, and the Technion - Israel Institute of Technology. Following his visit to ALYN, Reeve stated that he was in awe of the work being done, particularly in regard to spinal cord injuries.

== 2010 Haiti earthquake relief ==
In February, a team of medical experts from ALYN Hospital specializing in the rehabilitation of amputees went to Haiti to assess needs for providing rehabilitation for the injured and training Haitian therapists. The delegations went under the auspicies of ISRA-AID and Tevel B tzedek. The delegations continued to provide therapy for the earthquake patients until June 2010 in Israel.

== See also ==
- List of hospitals in Israel
- Health care in Israel
