= Israeli IVF mix-up case =

The Israeli IVF mix-up case was a series of legal, ethical, and medical events following the discovery of a genetic error during an in-vitro fertilization (IVF) procedure at Assuta Medical Center in Rishon LeZion, Israel. The incident, which began in September 2022, involved a pregnant woman who was informed that the fetus she was carrying was not genetically related to her or her partner. This discovery led to a highly publicized and contentious legal battle that spanned over two years, raising important questions about genetic parenthood, emotional bonds, and the best interests of children in similar situations.

== Discovery and initial investigation ==
In September 2022, a woman at Assuta Medical Center, while in her 30th week of pregnancy, was informed through genetic testing that the fetus she was carrying was not biologically related to her or her husband. Following this discovery, the Israeli Ministry of Health intervened and immediately began an investigation. A committee, led by Professor Ami Fishman, was formed to identify the biological parents of the fetus. The hospital was ordered to cease taking on new IVF patients to prevent similar occurrences until the investigation was complete.

== Birth and initial legal rulings ==
The baby was born on October 26, 2022, and the woman who gave birth to her chose to keep and raise her. The parents were officially registered as the baby's legal guardians in the Israeli Ministry of Interior. However, despite their wishes, the medical center continued to search for the biological parents, resulting in a complex legal dispute.

On January 29, 2023, the Central District Court of Israel rejected an appeal by the non-biological parents and ordered genetic testing on several other couples and a single mother who claimed the child might be theirs. The Supreme Court of Israel decided on March 8, 2023, to halt further genetic testing on additional couples. Nevertheless, by October 2023, the Central District Court allowed a genetic test for another couple, escalating the legal complexities. The non-biological parents appealed to the High Court in an effort to prevent further testing.

== Identification of biological parents ==
On March 7, 2024, it was publicly revealed that six months prior, the biological parents of the child had been identified. This development led to continued disputes regarding custody and the legal status of the child.

== Final ruling and transfer of custody ==
On November 24, 2024, the Family Court in Rishon LeZion made a final ruling that the two-year-old child, who had been raised by the non-biological parents since birth, should be transferred to her biological parents.
