= List of hospitals in Israel =

This is a list of hospitals in Israel by district and city.

== Central District ==
=== Be'er Ya'akov ===
- Yitzhak Shamir Medical Center (formerly Assaf Harofeh Medical Center)
- Shmuel HaRofeh Geriatric Hospital

=== Gedera ===
- Ganim Sanatorium
- Herzfeld Geriatric Hospital

=== Hod HaSharon ===
- Hedvat Horim Geriatric Hospital
- Shalvata (psychiatric)

=== Hof HaSharon Regional Council ===
- Kiryat Shlomo Geriatric Hospital

=== Kfar Saba ===
- Meir Hospital (Sapir Medical Center)

=== Lev HaSharon Regional Council ===
- Lev HaSharon Psychiatric Hospital

=== Ness Ziona ===
- Ness Ziona Psychiatric Hospital

=== Netanya ===
- Laniado Hospital
- Lev Hasharon (psychiatric)
- Netanya Geriatric Medical Center

=== Petah Tikva ===
- Schneider Children's Medical Center of Israel
- Beit Rivka Geriatric Hospital
- Rabin Medical Center
  - Beilinson Campus
    - Geha Psychiatric Hospital
  - Golda–HaSharon Campus

=== Ra'anana ===
- Loewenstein Hospital Rehabilitation Center

=== Rehovot ===
- Kaplan Medical Center

== Haifa District ==
=== Daliyat al-Karmel ===
- Dekel Medical Center

=== Hadera ===
- Hillel Yaffe Medical Center

=== Haifa ===
General hospitals:

- Bnai Zion Medical Center (Rothschild)
- Carmel Hospital (Lady Davis)
- Rambam Medical Center
- Horev Medical Center

Specialised hospitals and research facilities:

- Elisha Hospital
- Fliman Geriatric Hospital
- Italian Hospital in Haifa
- Lin Medical Center (associated with Carmel Hospital, outpatient service)

=== Kiryat Ata ===
- Kiryat Binyamin Hospital

=== Pardes Hanna-Karkur ===
- Neve Shalva (psychiatric)
- Shoham Medical Center (geriatric)
- Sha'ar Menashe (psychiatric)

=== Tirat HaCarmel ===
- Maale Hacarmel mental health center

== Jerusalem District ==
=== Jerusalem ===
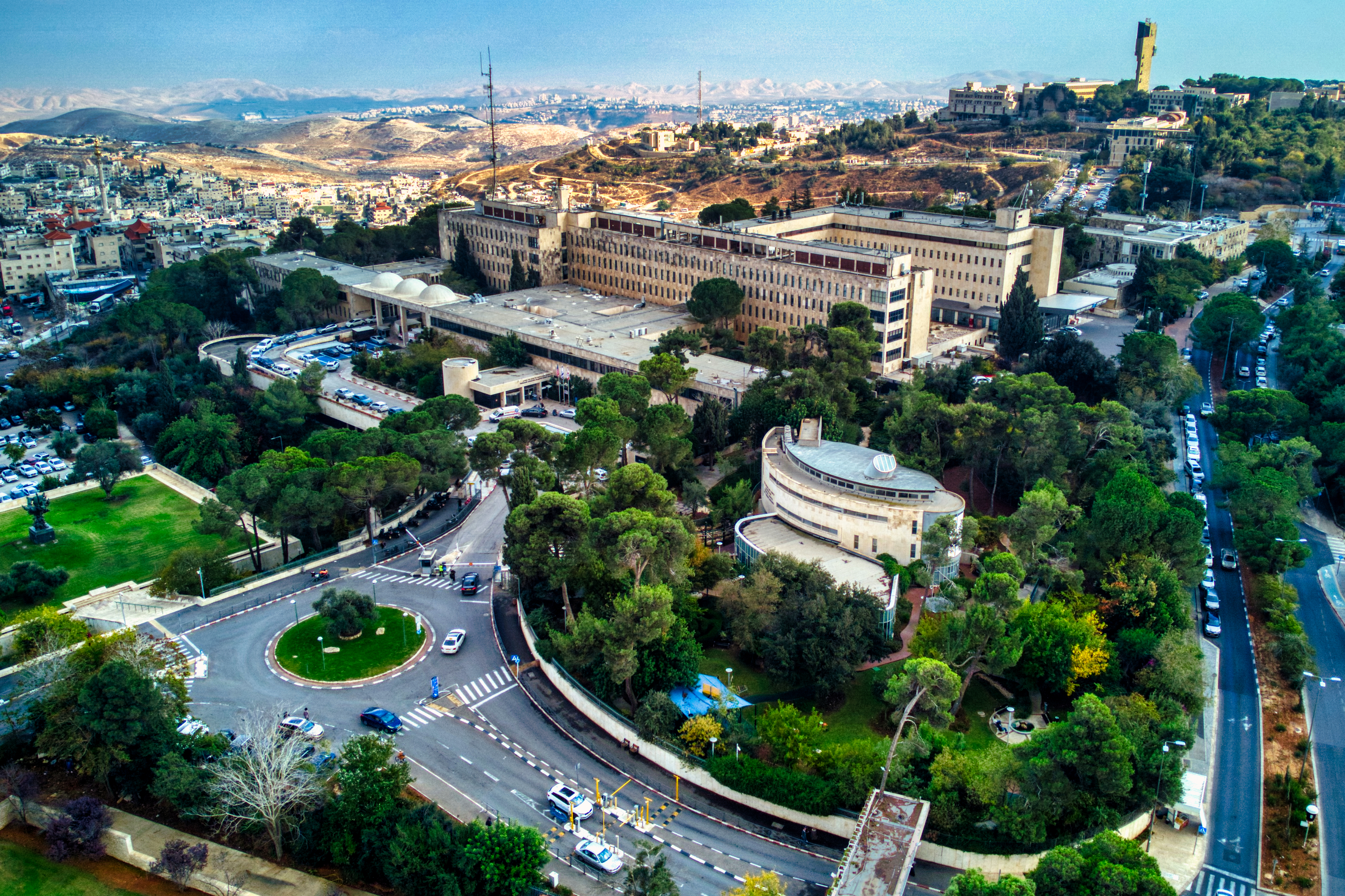
Hadassah University Hospital, Mt. Scopus, Jerusalem

See Muristan for the Crusader-era hospital in Jerusalem.

General hospitals:

- Shaare Zedek Medical Center
- Bikur Holim Hospital
- Hadassah Ein Kerem Hospital
- Hadassah Mount Scopus Hospital
- Augusta Victoria Hospital
- Al-Makassed Islamic Charitable Hospital (Al-Quds University Teaching Hospital)

Specialised hospitals:

- ALYN Hospital Pediatric and Adolescent Rehabilitation Center
- Kfar Shaul Mental Health Center (psychiatric)
- Issam al-Jeobi Geriatric Hospital (Beit Hanina)
- Saint John Eye Hospital Group (formerly St John Ophthalmic Hospital)
- Eitanim (psychiatric)
- Herzog Hospital
- Misgav Ladach
- Saint Louis French Hospital (palliative care)

=== Ma'ale Adumim ===
- Amal, Hod Adumim (geriatric, rehabilitation)

== Northern District ==
=== Afula ===
- HaEmek Medical Center

=== Acre ===
- Fligelman (Mazra) Psychiatric Hospital

=== Tiberias ===
- Tzafon Medical Center (a.k.a. Poriya Hospital, Baruch Padeh Medical Center)

=== Nahariya ===
- Galilee Medical Center

=== Nazareth ===
- EMMS Nazareth Hospital ("The Scottish Hospital")
- French Nazareth Hospital (Saint Vincent Hospital)
- Holy Family Hospital (officially L'Ospedale Sacra Famiglia di Nazareth or "The Italian Hospital")

=== Safed ===
- Rebecca Sieff Hospital
- Hadassah Hospital

== Southern District ==
=== Ashdod ===
- Assuta Ashdod Medical Center

=== Ashkelon ===
- Barzilai Medical Center

=== Beersheba ===
- Soroka Medical Center
- Assuta Beersheba Medical Center

=== Ofakim ===
- The Harvey and Gloria Kaylie Rehabilitation Medical Center at ADI Negev-Nahalat Eran

=== Eilat ===
- Yoseftal Medical Center

== Tel Aviv District ==
=== Bat Yam ===
- Abrabanel Psychiatric Hospital
- Bayit Balev Rehabilitation Hospital

=== Bnei Brak ===
- Mayanei Hayeshua Medical Center

=== Herzliya ===
- Herzliya Medical Center

=== Holon ===
- Wolfson Medical Center

=== Ramat Gan ===
- Sheba Medical Center (Tel HaShomer Hospital)
- Ramat Marpe Hospital

=== Rishon Lezion ===
- Assuta Medical Center

=== Tel Aviv ===
- Assuta Medical Center
- Naot Hatikhon Geriatric Center
- Reuth Medical and Rehabilitation Center
- Tel Aviv Sourasky Medical Center
  - Ichilov Hospital
  - Lis Maternity and Women's Hospital
  - Dana-Dwek Children's Hospital
  - Rehabilitation Hospital

==== Jaffa ====
- Tzarfati Hospital
