= Ramat HaHayal =

Northeastern neighborhood of Tel Aviv, Israel

Coordinates: 32°6′54.93″N 34°50′11.43″E

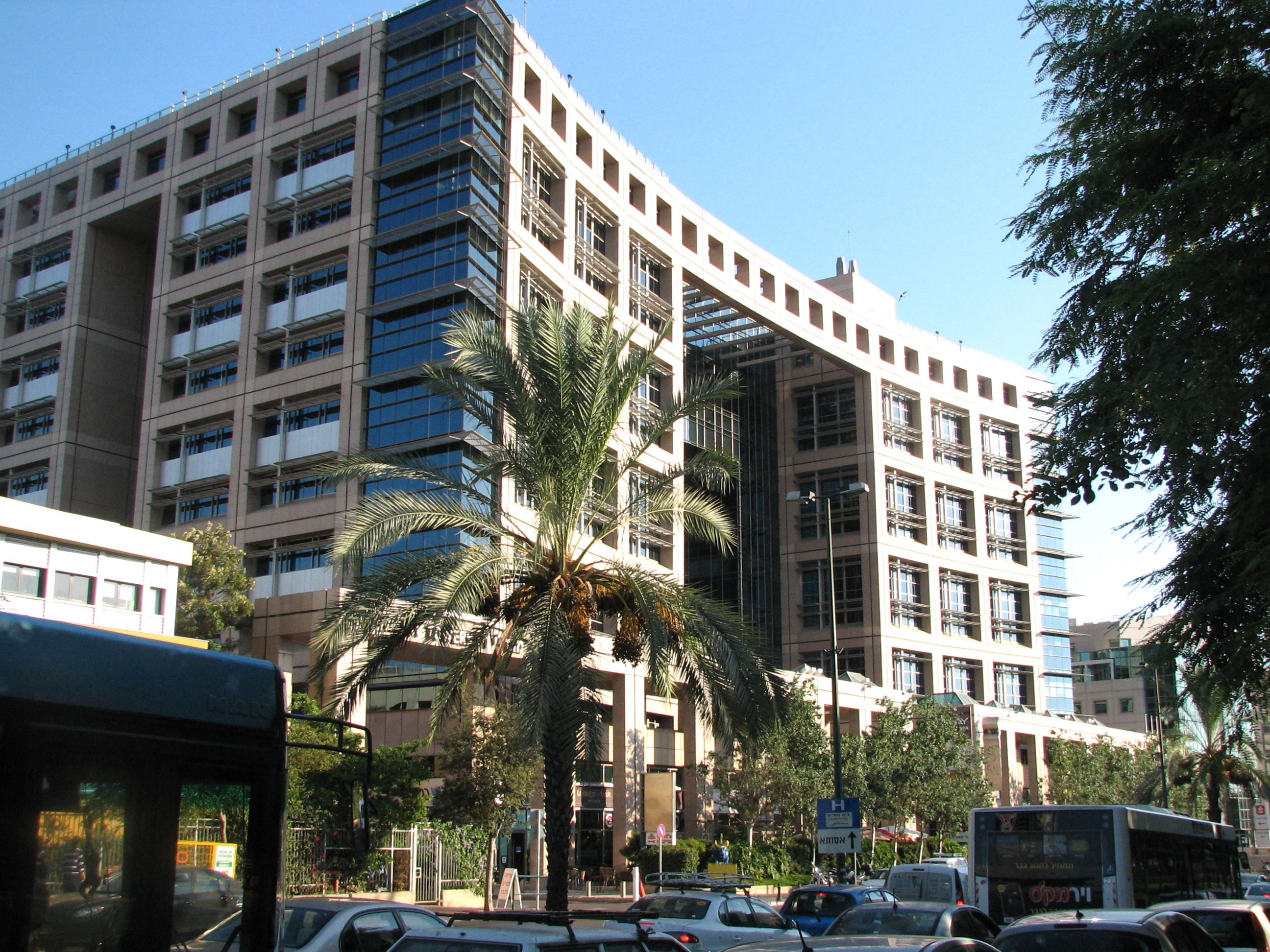
Ramat HaHayal, Tel Aviv

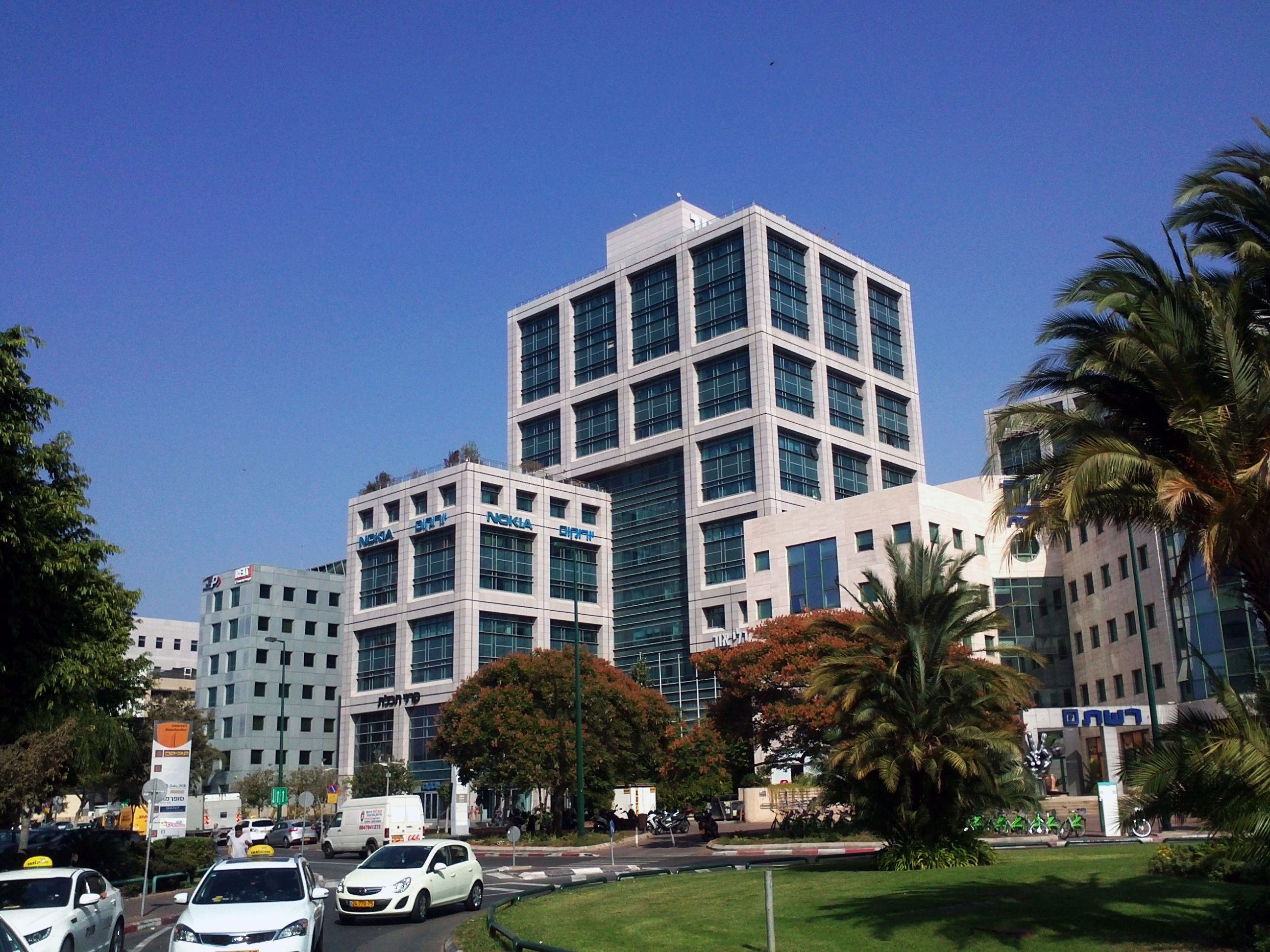
Nokia building

Ramat HaHayal (Hebrew: רמת החייל, lit. Soldier's Hill) is a northeastern neighborhood of Tel Aviv, Israel. Some high tech firms have research and development offices in Ramat HaHayal.

== History ==
The neighborhood was established in 1949 to absorb demobilized soldiers after the 1948 Arab–Israeli War.

In 1954, Tel Aviv municipality donated a plot of land on Golan Street in Ramat HaHayal, dubbed "Shikun Shanghai", to members of the Jewish community from Shanghai, China, who left during the final stages of the Chinese Civil War.

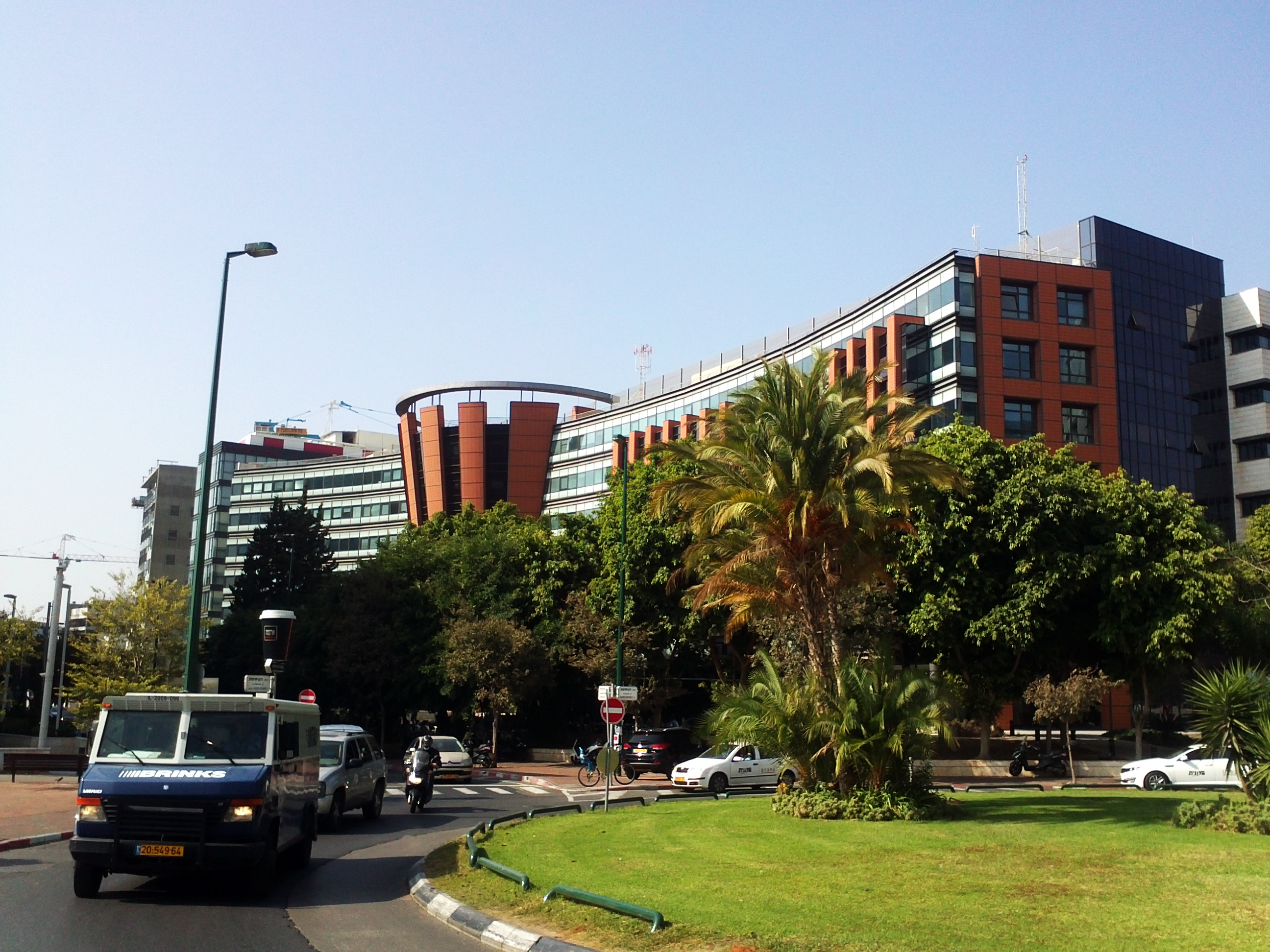
HaBarzel street

Until 2010, it was widely assumed that the neighborhood had been named after the Jewish Brigade and its name was written in Hebrew רמת החי"ל (lit. Jewish Brigade Heights), including in official municipal signs. The mistake was corrected by the municipality in 2010.

Many Israeli high-tech companies, among them Nisko, RAD Data Communications, BMC Software, Comverse Technology and Radwin are located in Ramat HaHayal. IBM maintains a research and development facility there.

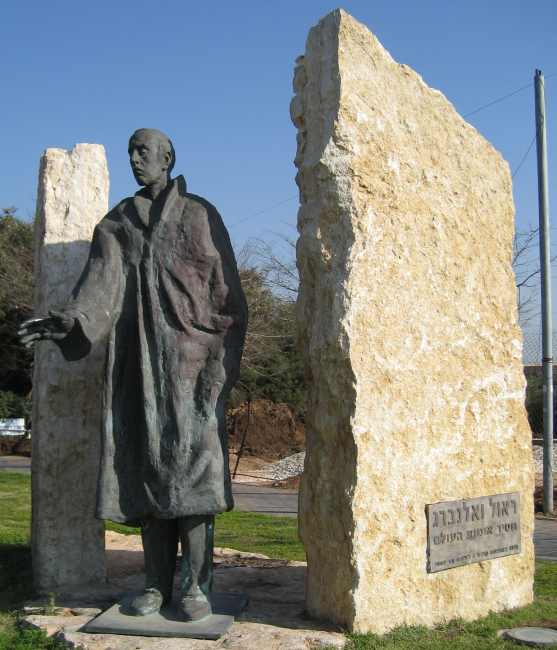
Raoul Wallenberg monument, Ramat HaHayal

The offices of the Israeli television broadcasting company Keshet are in Ramat HaHayal.

In 2002, a monument dedicated to the Swedish diplomat Raoul Wallenberg was erected at the intersection of Raoul Wallenberg and HaBarzel streets in Ramat HaHayal.

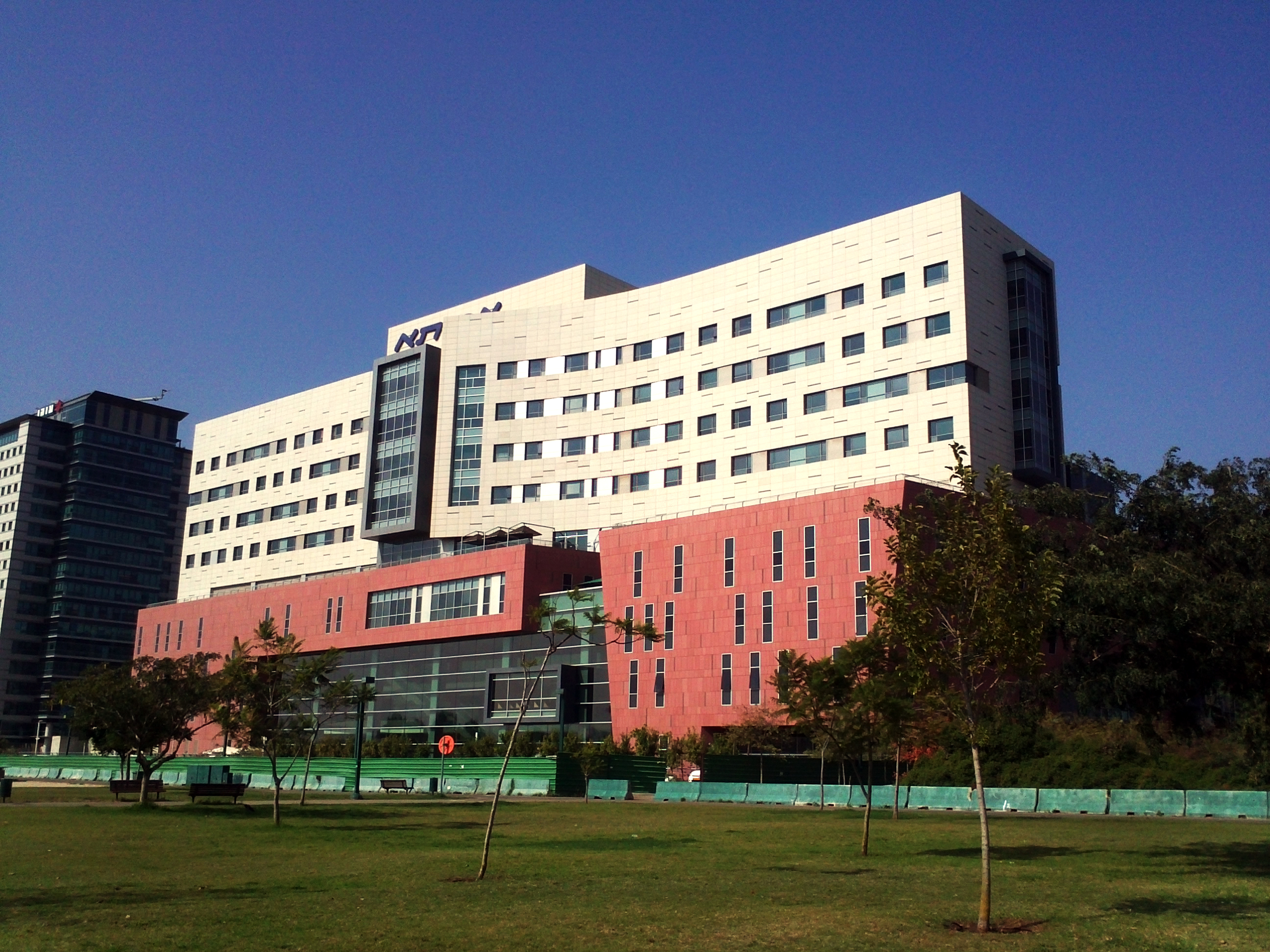
New building of Assuta Medical Center

Assuta Medical Center, Israel's largest private medical provider, moved from central Tel Aviv to a new compound in Ramat HaHayal. The upscale facility, with 16 operating rooms, is located on HaBarzel Street.

== Archaeology ==
In February 1997, archaeological excavations carried out at Ramat HaHayal found two wall foundations with abutting floor fragments, a pit, and ceramic and glass shards from the 8th–9th centuries BCE. A burial cave of the intermediate Bronze Age was cut into soft Kurkar stone, and several intact vessels were discovered belonging to the known types from the Yarkon River area.

== See also ==
- Economy of Israel
- History of Tel Aviv
- Science and technology in Israel
- List of Israeli companies
