= Giora Yoseftal =

Israeli politician (1912–1962)

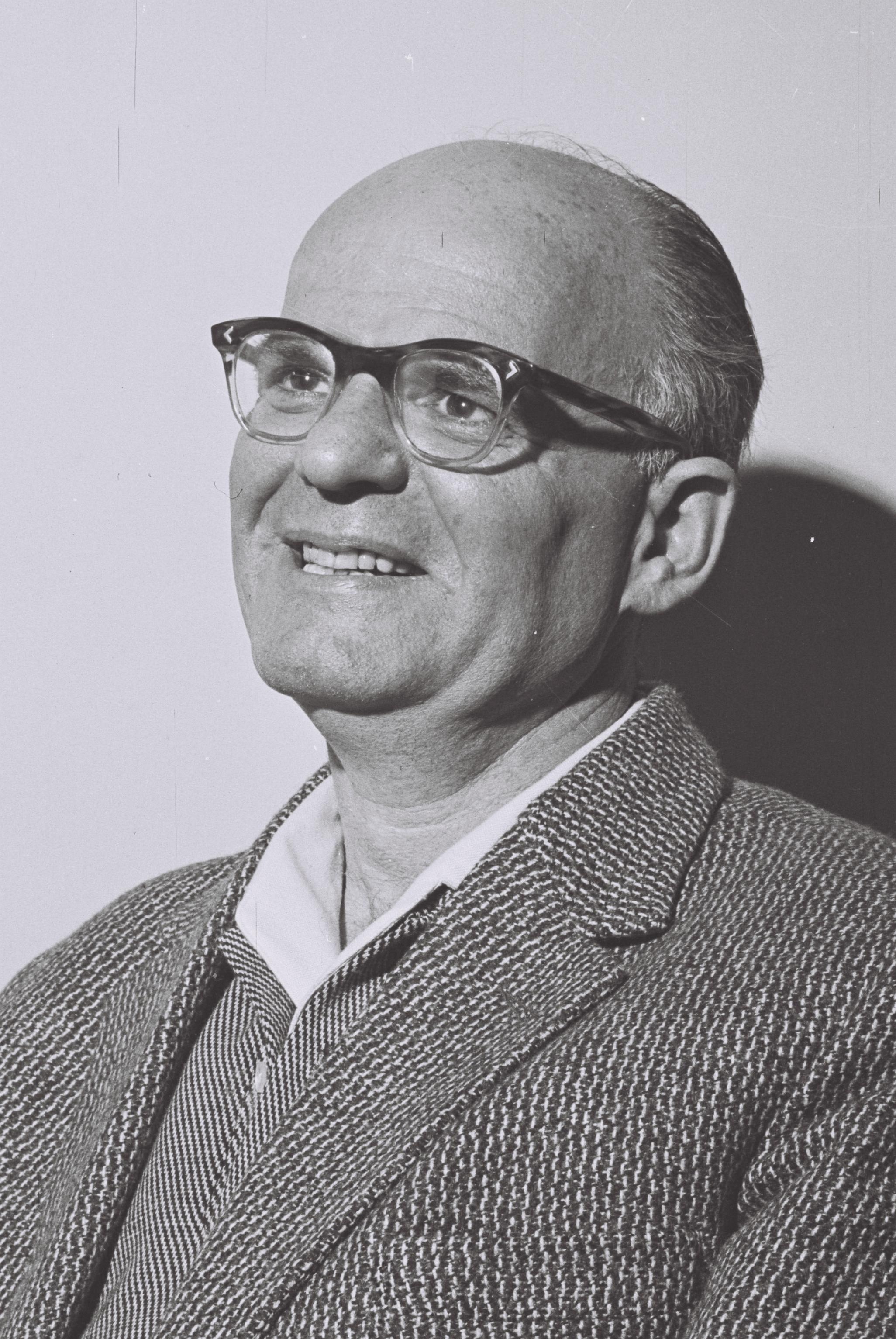
- Yoseftal in 1959

Ministerial roles
- 1959–1961: Minister of Labour
- 1961–1962: Minister of Housing
- 1961–1962: Minister of Development

Faction represented in the Knesset
- 1959–1962: Mapai

Personal details
- Born: 9 August 1912 Nuremberg, Germany
- Died: 23 August 1962 (aged 50)

Dr Giora Yoseftal (Hebrew: גיורא יוספטל; 9 August 1912 – 23 August 1962) was an Israeli politician who held several ministerial portfolios in the late 1950s and early 1960s.

== Biography ==
Born Georg Josephthal in Nuremberg in Germany, Yoseftal was a member of the Yiddisher Yudenbund youth movement in his teens. After high school, he studied law and economics at Heidelberg University, the Friedrich Wilhelm University of Berlin, the Ludwig-Maximilians-Universität München and the University of Basel, gaining a PhD in jurisprudence at the latter.

In 1932 he joined Habonim, and the following year was appointed head of the youth department of the Bavarian Jewish community. He moved to Berlin in 1934 and two years later was elected secretary general of the German branch of HeHalutz. In 1936 he married Senetta Yoseftal, later also an Israeli politician.

Yoseftal emigrated to Mandate Palestine in 1938, and two months after arriving was sent to London to try to save German Jewry. He returned to Palestine in 1939, establishing a work brigade in Ra'anana, which later founded kibbutz Gal'ed in 1945.

In 1939 he was a key player in the clandestine operation to save 480 German Jews from Nazi Germany and to transport them by sea on the SS Dora to Palestine.

In 1943 he joined the British Army. After the war ended, he took over the absorption section of the Jewish Agency's aliyah department. Between 1947 and 1952 he sat on the Agency's board. In 1952 he was a member of the delegations which negotiated the Reparations Agreement between Israel and the Federal Republic of Germany.

In 1956 he became secretary-general of Mapai, the ruling party, a role he held until 1959. In the elections that year he was voted into the Knesset on Mapai's list, and was appointed Minister of Labour. He retained his seat in the 1961 elections, and was given the roles of Minister of Housing and Minister of Development. He died in office on 23 August 1962.

In March 2018 the city of Netanya decided to change the name of a street named after Yoseftal because of his discriminatory policies towards North African immigrants in the 1950s.

The Yoseftal Medical Center in Eilat is named for him; he was instrumental in its construction and location but did not live to see it opened.
