= Benno Chajes =

German politician (1880–1938)

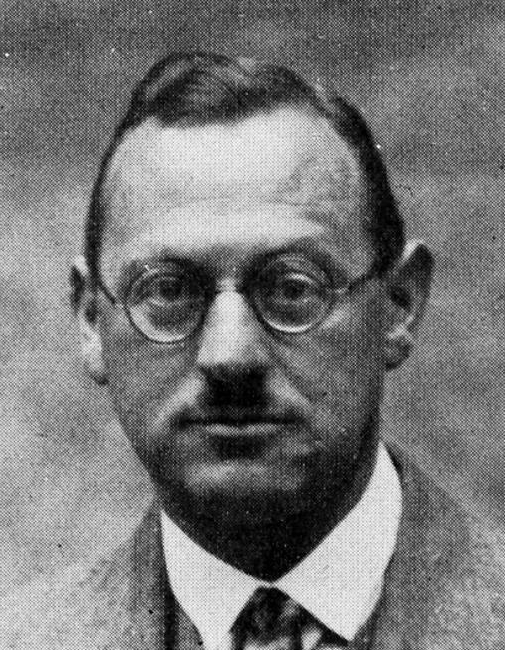
- Chajes c. 1932

Member of the Landtag of Prussia
- In office 1928–1933

Personal details
- Born: 14 November 1880 Danzig, West Prussia, German Empire (Gdańsk, Poland)
- Died: 3 October 1938 (aged 57) Ascona, Switzerland
- Party: Social Democratic Party of Germany (SPD)
- Spouse(s): Käte Schattner (1882–1925); Flora Rosenbund (1898–1942)
- Relations: Eduard Bernstein (step-father of Käte Schattner)

Benno Chajes (14 November 1880 – 3 October 1938) was a German physician, professor for social medicine and politician. He was a member of the Landtag of Prussia representing the Social Democratic Party of Germany.

Chajes was born in Danzig, West Prussia, German Empire (Gdańsk, Poland) to Wolf Chajes (1845–1901) and Emma née Braff (1846–1932), he passed his Abitur in Danzig and studied medicine at the University of Berlin and the University of Freiburg. He received his doctorate in 1903 in Freiburg and started to practice as an assistant doctor in 1903 at the Charité in Berlin. From 1904 to 1907 he worked for Alfred Blaschko and in 1907 at the Hôpital Saint-Louis in Paris.

He returned to Berlin in 1908 to work at Hans Goldschmidt's clinic and started his private practice specialising in dermatology, sexual diseases and urology in 1911 in Berlin Schöneberg. From 1906 to 1921 he worked as public assistant doctor in Schöneberg, from 1915 to 1933 he was the physician of the Deutsches Theater (Berlin). Chajes joined the Association of socialist physicians (Verein sozialistischer Ärzte) in 1913 and became its deputy chairman in 1924.

In World War I he served as a military physician from 1915 to 1918 and was awarded the Iron Cross second class. During the German Revolution he was a member of the workers' and soldiers council in Frankfurt (Oder), he is described either as chairman of the central department of the soldiers' councils in the Province of Brandenburg or in the Regierungsbezirk Frankfurt (Oder). Chajes was a delegate at the national congress of councils.

In 1919 he started to lecture at the Technical University Charlottenburg on industrial hygiene. In 1922 he became a member of the Committee for industrial hygiene at the International Labour Office in Geneva. He was elected a member of the Landtag of Prussia in 1928 and became his faction's expert in public health services. He followed Alfred Grotjahn at the University of Berlin and headed the Institute for social hygiene at the University of Berlin from 1931 on.

Being Jewish, Chajes lost his positions according to the Law for the Restoration of the Professional Civil Service after the Nazi seizure of power in 1933. He emigrated via Switzerland and Turkey to Mandate Palestine, where he arrived in autumn 1933. In 1934 he started to practice as a physician in Tel Aviv.

Chajes was engaged in constituting healthcare in Israel, he co-founded the Assuta Medical Center and the Shiloah Insurance company, today part of the Harel Group. In 1935 Chajes became the chairman of the Committee for industrial and social hygiene of the Histadrut Union.

He died in 1938 while on vacation in Ascona, Switzerland.

== Family ==
Chajes was married to Käte Schattner (1882–1925), step-daughter of Eduard Bernstein, and in a second marriage to Flora Rosenbund (1898–1942).

== Publications ==
- Die nervösen Störungen der Herztätigkeit (phd, 1903)
- Grundriss der Berufskunde und Berufshygiene, 1919
- Kompendium der sozialen Hygiene, 1921
- Der Achtstundentag (mit Wachenheim u. Schweitzer), 1926
