= Assuta Medical Center =

Private medical center in Tel Aviv, Israel

Coordinates: 32°6′28.43″N 34°50′19.7″E

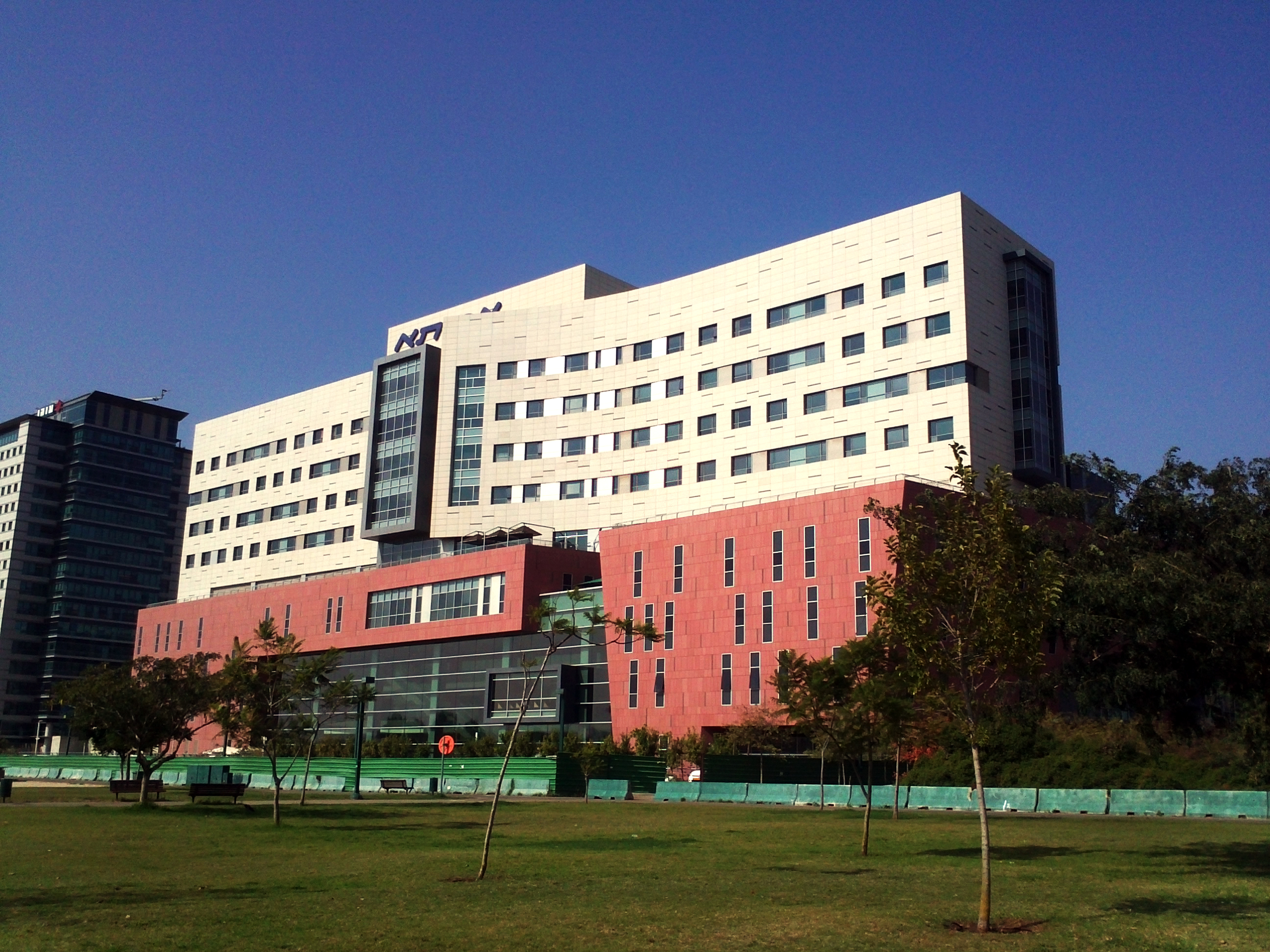
- New Assuta hospital building in Ramat HaHayal

Geography
- Location: Tel Aviv, Israel

Links
- Website: en.assuta.co.il
- Lists: Hospitals in Israel

Assuta Medical Center (Hebrew: אסותא מרכזים רפואיים) is a private medical center (and company) in the Ramat HaHayal neighborhood in north Tel Aviv, Israel established in 1936. The hospital performs surgery and diagnostic procedures in all fields of medicine, including cardiology, oncology, gynecology and urology.

== History ==
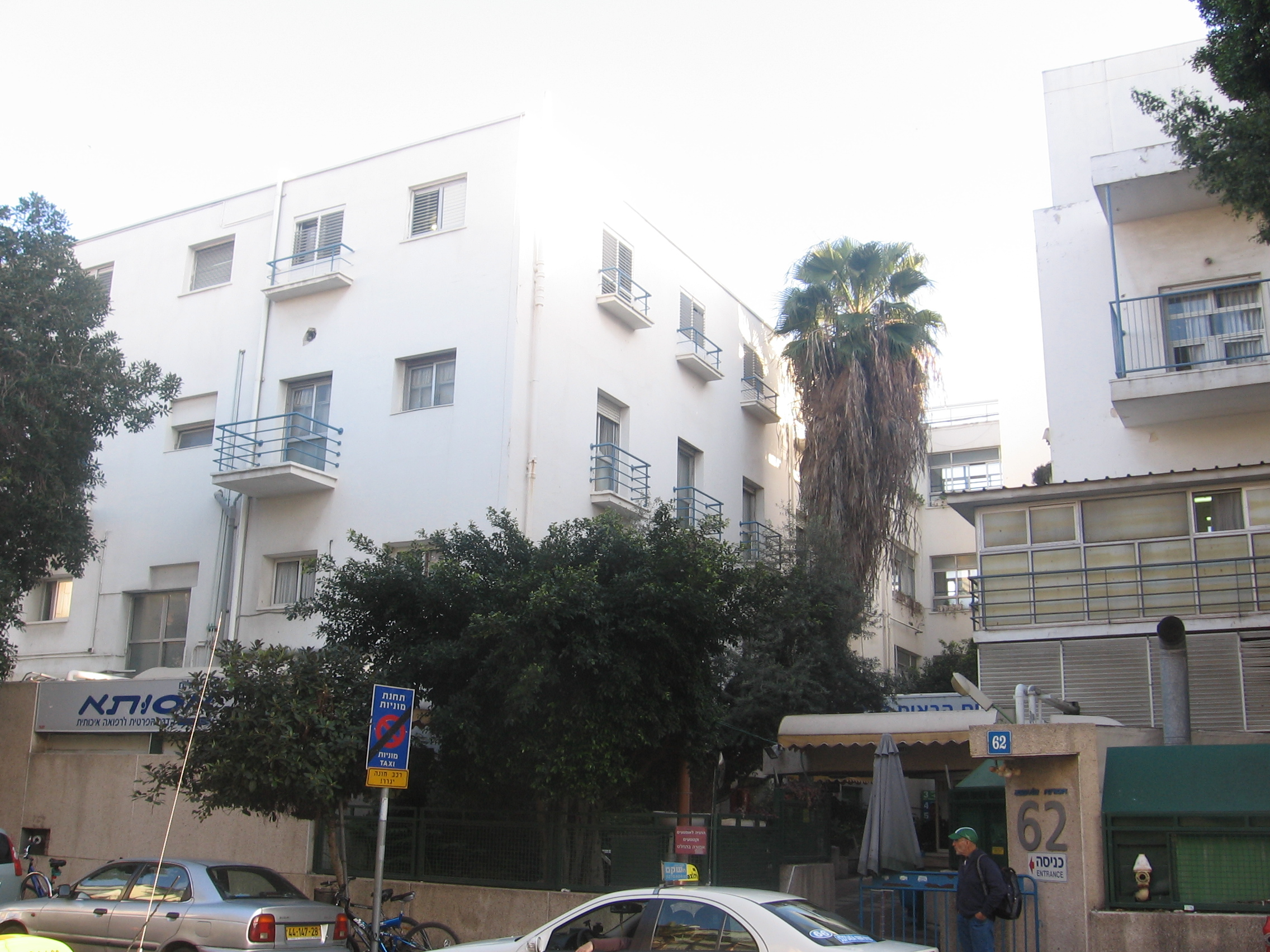
Old Bauhaus building on Jabotinsky Street

The hospital was founded in Tel Aviv in 1936 by Ben-Zion Harel, a physician who later became a Member of Knesset. It had a staff of 34 doctors and 74 beds. The architect was Joseph Neufeld, a leading proponent of the International Style in Israel.

In 2009, Assuta moved to a new building in Ramat HaHayal. With floor space of 90,000 sq. meters (970,000 sq. feet), it is the largest private hospital in Israel. The building was designed by Canadian firm Zeidler Partnership Architects and Israeli architectural firms of Marcelo Brestovisky and Moore Yasky Sivan. Assuta is owned by the Maccabi Health Care Services Group.

As of 2011 the hospital had sixteen operating rooms and is certified for surgical procedures in all specialty areas. Some 17,000 operations are performed every year, including complicated surgical procedures such as open-heart surgery, neurological procedures. The hospital operates a cardiac catheterization laboratory and performs all types of angiography procedures, including diagnostic and therapeutic procedures, and stent insertion during angioplasty.

Assuta is one of seven Israeli hospitals that received accreditation from the Joint Commission International, an organization that sets safety standards for medical care.

Assuta Hospital's IVF clinic performs 7,000 cycles a year. In 2002, the journal Human Reproduction Update reported that 1,657 IVF procedures per million people per year were performed in Israel, compared with 899 in Iceland, which was second in line. At Assuta's fertility center, a lab houses 25 incubators and 60,000 frozen embryos stored in liquid nitrogen. While the procedure is state-paid at public hospitals, Assuta patients are charged a co-payment of approximately $150.

In 2011, Assuta won the tender for building a new medical center in Ashdod. Assuta operates four hospitals and four outpatient medical centers in Israel. Assuta services in Ashdod will include the operation of an emergency room in a sheltered structure protected from missile attacks, an internal medicine ward, a geriatrics ward, a pediatrics ward, a cardiology center, and oncology institute and a dialysis institute. The wards will have a total of 105 beds with another 100 beds for brief hospitalizations.

In September 2022, a woman at Assuta Medical Center, while in her 30th week of pregnancy, was informed through genetic testing that the fetus she was carrying was not biologically related to her or her husband. Following this discovery, the Israeli Ministry of Health intervened and immediately began an investigation. A committee, led by Professor Ami Fishman, was formed to identify the biological parents of the fetus. The hospital was ordered to cease taking on new IVF patients to prevent similar occurrences until the investigation was complete. Following a protracted legal case, on November 24, 2024, the Family Court in Rishon LeZion made a final ruling that the two-year-old child, who had been raised by the non-biological parents since birth, should be transferred to her biological parents.

== See also ==
- Health care in Israel
- Medical tourism in Israel
- List of hospitals in Israel
- Architecture in Israel
- Benno Chajes
