= 2024 Eli shooting =

Terror attack during the Gaza war

- Part of the Israeli–Palestinian conflict
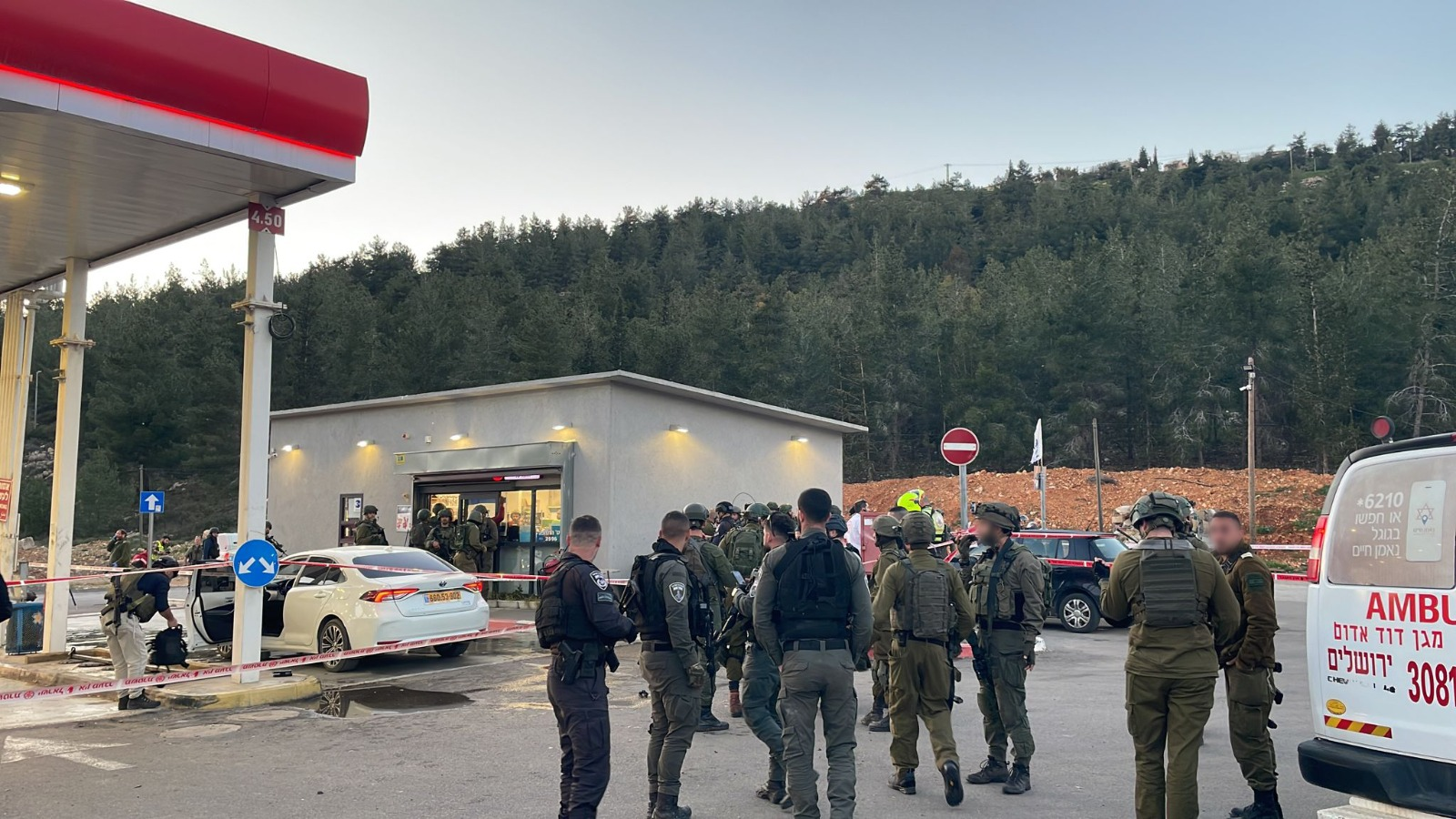
- Israeli security forces at the scene of the attack
- Location: 32°03′50.1″N 35°15′51.6″E; Gas station, Eli, West Bank
- Date: 29 February 2024
- Attack type: Shooting
- Deaths: 2
- Perpetrator: Mohammad Manasrah

On 29 February 2024, a Palestinian man opened fire at a gas station near the Eli settlement in northern Binyamin in the West Bank, killing two Israeli citizens.

The attack took place 8 months after another shooting at the same location, in which 4 Israelis were killed.

== Attack ==
Around five in the afternoon, Mohammad Manasrah, a Palestinian man armed with a storm rifle, opened fire on Israeli citizens outside a gas station near the settlement of Eli. Two people sitting in a car by the gas station were shot and killed.

Manasrah was killed by Aviad Gezber, a reservist officer and the manager of "Hummus Eliyahu" at the gas station, who was on break from reserve service in the Gaza Strip. A second man involved in planning the shooting was also killed at the scene.

Manasrah, from Qalandia Camp, served as an investigation officer at a rank equivalent to a chief warrant officer in the Palestinian Authority police and was released in 2019 from imprisonment for firearms theft offenses.

== Aftermath ==
According to the IDF, two other men were involved in planning the shooting, both of whom were killed by IDF personnel.

On the night of 29 February 2024, IDF personnel visited Manasrah's house to "map the home for its potential demolition". It was demolished on 24 July 2024 as part of a raid on the Qalandiya refugee camp.
