= Neve Avot =

Neve Avot: נווה אבות (Hebrew)

- Location within Haifa region of Israel
- Coordinates: 32°29′05″N 34°58′04″E
- Country: Israel
- District: Haifa
- Subdistrict: Hadera
- Founded: 1948
- Population (2024): 60
- Website: shoham-medical.org.il

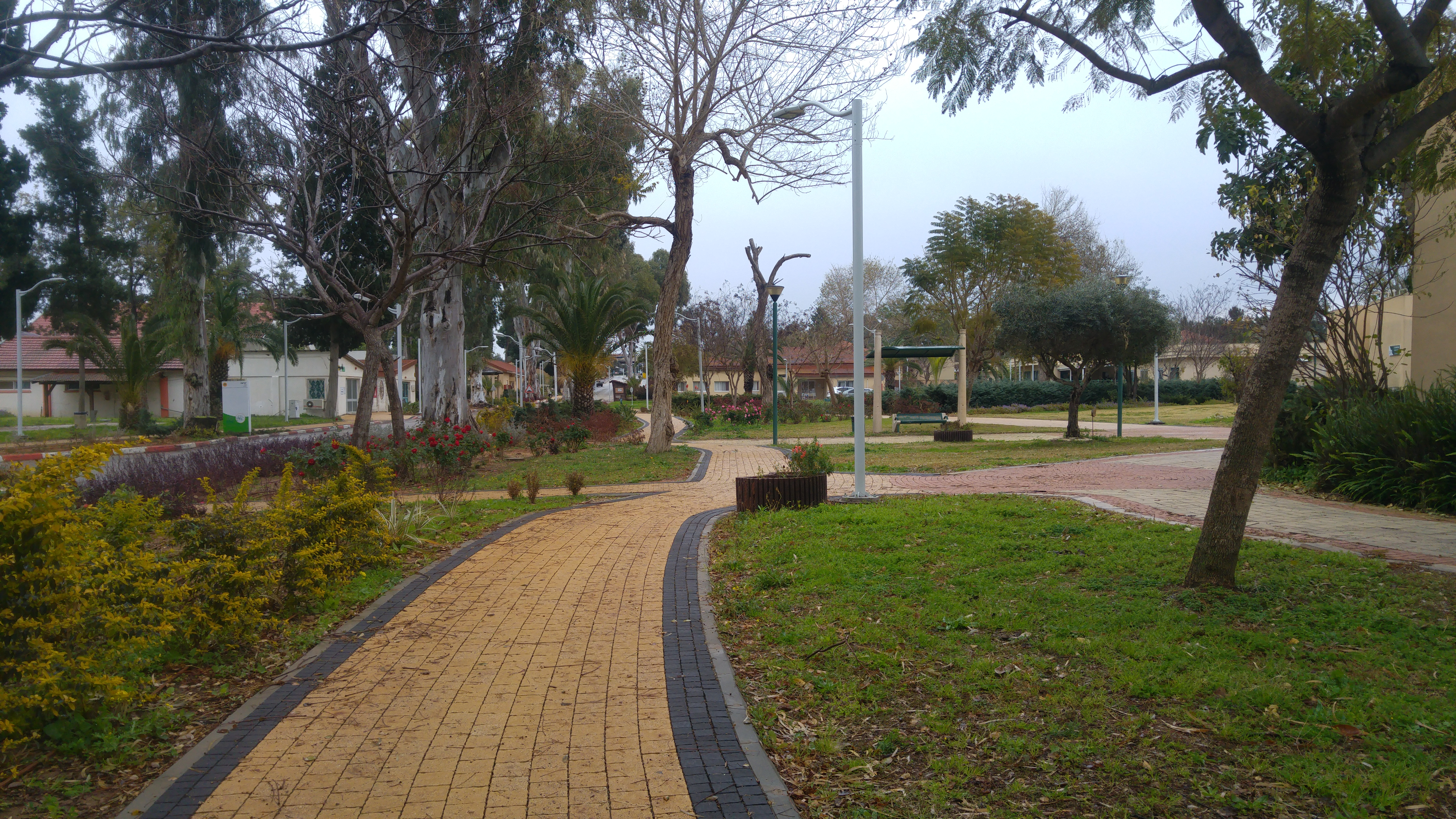

Neve Avot (Hebrew: נווה אבות), also known as the Shoham Combined Centre for Geriatric Medicine (המרכז המשולב לרפואה גריאטרית שהם), is a geriatric hospital in Israel. The center is located on the northern outskirts of Pardes Hanna-Karkur, but is recognized as a separate locality. In 2024 it had a population of 60.

== History ==
The hospital was established in 1948.
