= Herzliya Medical Center =

Hospital in Herzliya, Israel

Herzliya Medical Center is the largest private hospital in Israel, with over 5000 workers. Its net worth in 2024 according to Forbes is 1.1 billion NIS. Yair Landau owns 50% of the hospital, Clalit owns 40%, and Clal Insurance owns the remaining 10%. In January 2026, Yitzhak Tshuva attempted to buy 27% of the hospital, but the purchase ran into regulatory complications.

== History ==
Herzliya Medical Center was founded in 1982. A group of investors from South Africa decided to build a medical center modeled on those in their native country, and locate it in the beachside town of Herzliya – where doctors' offices would be located and supportive clinical services provided as well as surgical facilities for minor procedures. In its first year of operation, it had an occupancy rate of 18 percent. In 1991, the building underwent expansion and increased its number of operating rooms.

At the end of 1993 it opened a clinic in Gaza.

In June, 1995 Herzliya Medical Center signed a deal with the government of Tatarstan, for the establishment of an advanced hospital there.

- 1999 – The United Nations and UNDOF elected HMC the number one medical service provider in Israel.
- 2001 – The hospital founded their exclusive department of medical tourism, whose first patients were Embassy representatives that were posted to Israel.
- 2013 – Inspection of the Ministry of Health of Israel confirmed HMC as the best medical institution in the country.

Herzliya Medical Center is owned by the Landlan Investments Ltd. (50%), Clalit Health Services (40%) and Clal Insurance (10%). Herzliya Medical Center has more than 400 medical specialists in all leading branches of medicine.

The hospital has 7 Operating rooms

More than 9,000 thousand babies (as of January 2013) were born in the last 25 years to couples who had fertility problems and were treated in the fertilization of IVF at a private hospital in Herzliya Medical Center.

== Facilities ==
Herzliya Medical Center provides treatment for psychiatric needs of patients in addition to vital procedures such organ transplants, cardiac surgeries and neurosurgical treatments. Herzliya Medical Center also has Endoscopy Department. HMC Diagnostics Department includes a personal cytogenetic laboratory. It has four outpatient departments, a rehabilitation department, department of nuclear medicine, and other pathological laboratories. HMC has eight operating rooms.

- Center for Surgical Oncology – surgeons perform pancreas, liver, colon;
- General surgery – common procedures: bariatric surgery, gall bladder surgery, hernia anal fissures, hemorrhoids. Of complex operations are gastroenterological surgery and vascular surgery stomach;
- Orthopedic Center – surgery on the knee, hip, spine surgery;
- Heart Center – operations of heart defects, all kinds of angioplasty and catheterization;
- Cardiac Surgery Centre – has a license for open heart surgery, bypass surgery, valve replacement operations on the carotid artery and heart.

== Staff ==
Herzliya Medical Center Staff:

- 350 doctors
- 122 nurses
- 74 nurses with advanced certifications

== Publications ==
- Spivak, Hadar (21 September 2015). "A Simple Technique for Jejunojejunal Revision in Laparoscopic Roux-en-Y Gastric Bypass". Obesity Surgery. 25 (12). Department of Surgery, Herzliya Medical Center, Herzliya, Israel: 2461. doi:10.1007/s11695-015-1885-2. PMID 26391280.
- Gnainsky, Y; Dekel, N; Granot, I (September 2014). "Implantation: mutual activity of sex steroid hormones and the immune system guarantee the maternal-embryo interaction". Seminars in Reproductive Medicine. 32 (5). Department of Biological Regulation, The Weizmann Institute of Science, Rehovot, Israel; IVF Unit, Herzliya Medical Center, Herzliya, Israel.: 337–45. doi:10.1055/s-0034-1376353. PMID 24959815.
- Lapidoth, M; Adatto, M; David, M (November 2007). "Targeted UVB phototherapy for psoriasis: a preliminary study". Clinical and Experimental Dermatology. 32 (6). Dermatological Laser Clinic, Herzliya Medical Center, Herzeliya, Israel.: 642–5. doi:10.1111/j.1365-2230.2007.02469.x. PMID 17953632. S2CID 25835629.
- Barak, Y; Menezo, Y; Veiga, A; Elder, K (2001). "A physiological replacement for polyvinylpyrrolidone (PVP) in assisted reproductive technology". Human Fertility. 4 (2). In Vitro Fertilization Unit, Herzliya Medical Center: 99–103. doi:10.1080/1464727012000199371. PMID 11591264. S2CID 73047672.
- Goldman, S; Gonen, Y (August 1998). "Monoclonal antibodies against epidermal growth factor prevent outgrowth of mouse embryos in vitro". Human Reproduction (Oxford, England). 13 (8). IVF Unit, Herzliya Medical Center-Haifa: 2231–3. doi:10.1093/humrep/13.8.2231. PMID 9756302.

== See also ==
- List of Hospitals in Israel
- Health care in Israel
- Medical tourism
