= Kaplan Medical Center =

- Clalit Health Services
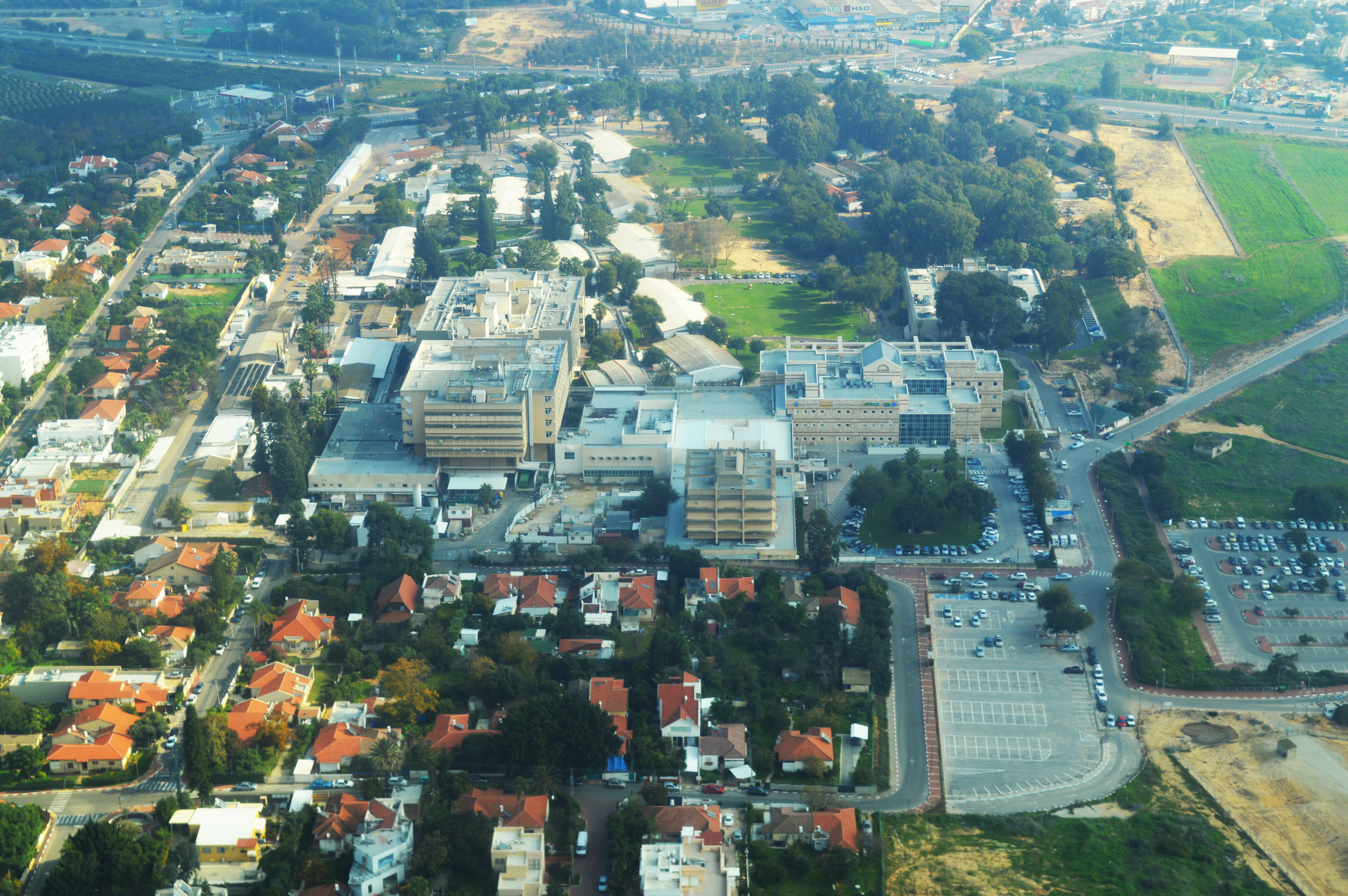
- Aerial view of the Kaplan Medical Center

Geography
- Location: Rehovot, Israel
- Coordinates: 31°52′24.51″N 34°48′53.03″E

Organisation
- Affiliated university: Hadassah, Hebrew University of Jerusalem

Services
- Beds: 625

History
- Opened: 1953

Links
- Website: kmc.org.il
- Lists: Hospitals in Israel

Kaplan Medical Center (Hebrew: מרכז רפואי קפלן, Merkaz Refu'i Kaplan) is a district general hospital in Rehovot, Israel, located in the south of the city next to Bilu Junction. It is owned and operated by Clalit Health Services.

== History ==
Kaplan Medical Center is a teaching hospital affiliated with Hadassah Medical Center and the Hebrew University of Jerusalem's Medical School. It also has a small branch in nearby Gedera, the Herzfeld Medical Center, which mainly serves as a geriatric hospital and nursing home.

In 2001, the hospital had 625 beds and in May 2007 was the tenth largest hospital in Israel. It was founded in 1953 and was named after Eliezer Kaplan, a well-known Zionist and the first Finance Minister of Israel.

== See also ==
- Healthcare in Israel
- List of hospitals in Israel
