= Elisha Medical Center =

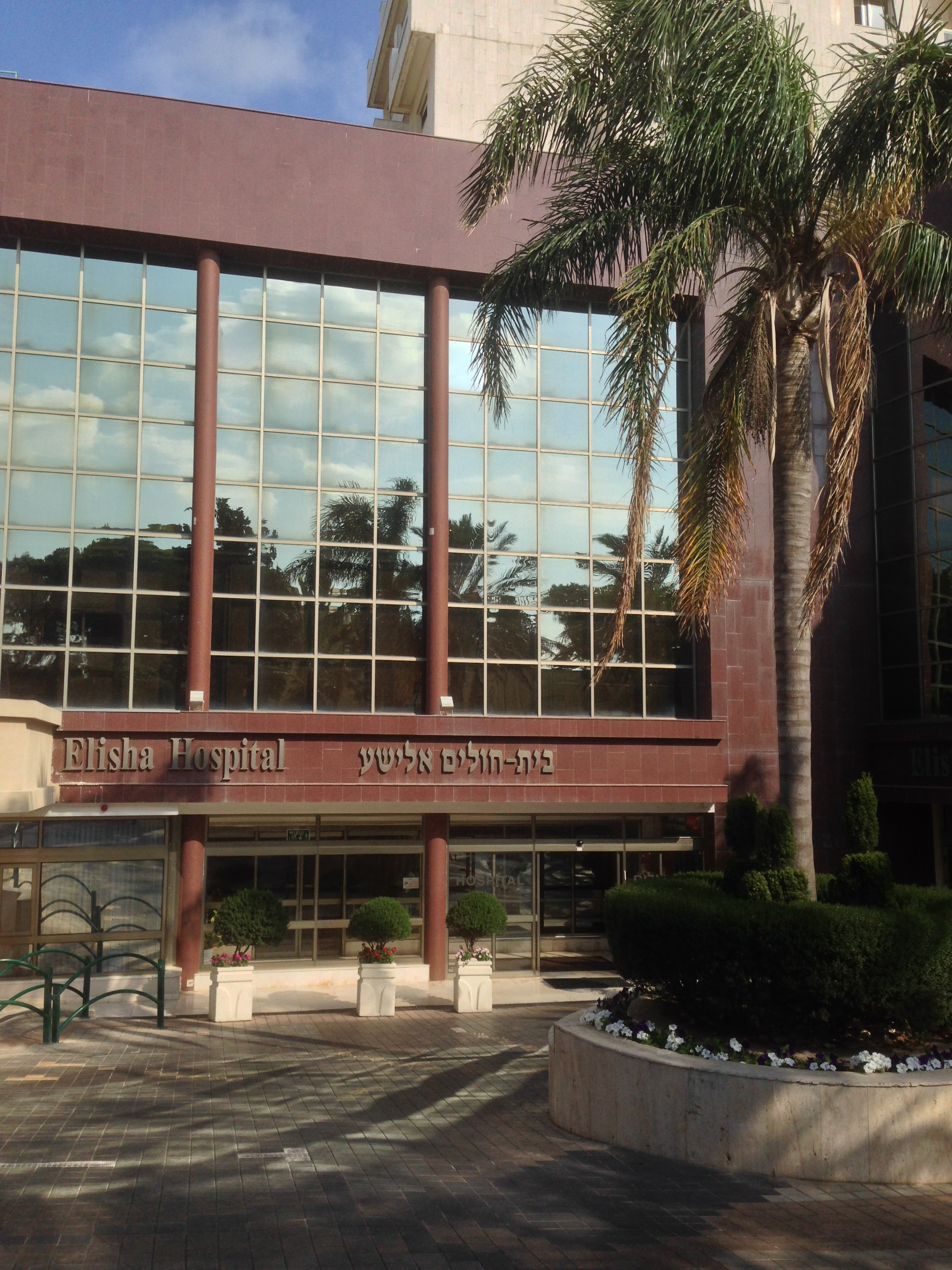

Geography
- Location: Haifa, Israel
- Coordinates: 32°48′03″N 34°59′32″E

Organisation
- Care system: Private

Services
- Beds: 140+

History
- Founded: May 31, 1949; 77 years ago

Links
- Website: www.elishahospital.com
- Lists: Hospitals in Israel

The Elisha Medical Center, also called Elisha Hospital (Hebrew: בית חולים אלישע) is a private hospital in Haifa, northern Israel. The center offers its patients physicians, technology and equipment, to provide the patients medical treatment. In order to expand its services and reach a broader patient population, the hospital has collaborated with the Rambam Medical Center. The facilities include the hyperbaric oxygen treatment center and the clinic for magnetic resonance imaging (MRI).

== Departments ==
The center has departments dedicated to surgery, gynecology, urology, orthopedics, cardiology, rehabilitation, gastroenterology and dialysis. Elisha has 140 hospital beds and six operation rooms designed to make different surgical procedures, from cardiac and plastic surgery, to back surgery and joint replacement. The hospital has a staff of 300 personnel and 200 doctors, which performs 10,000 surgical procedures, and 12,000 ambulatory procedures each year, as well as in vitro fertilization treatments (IVF).

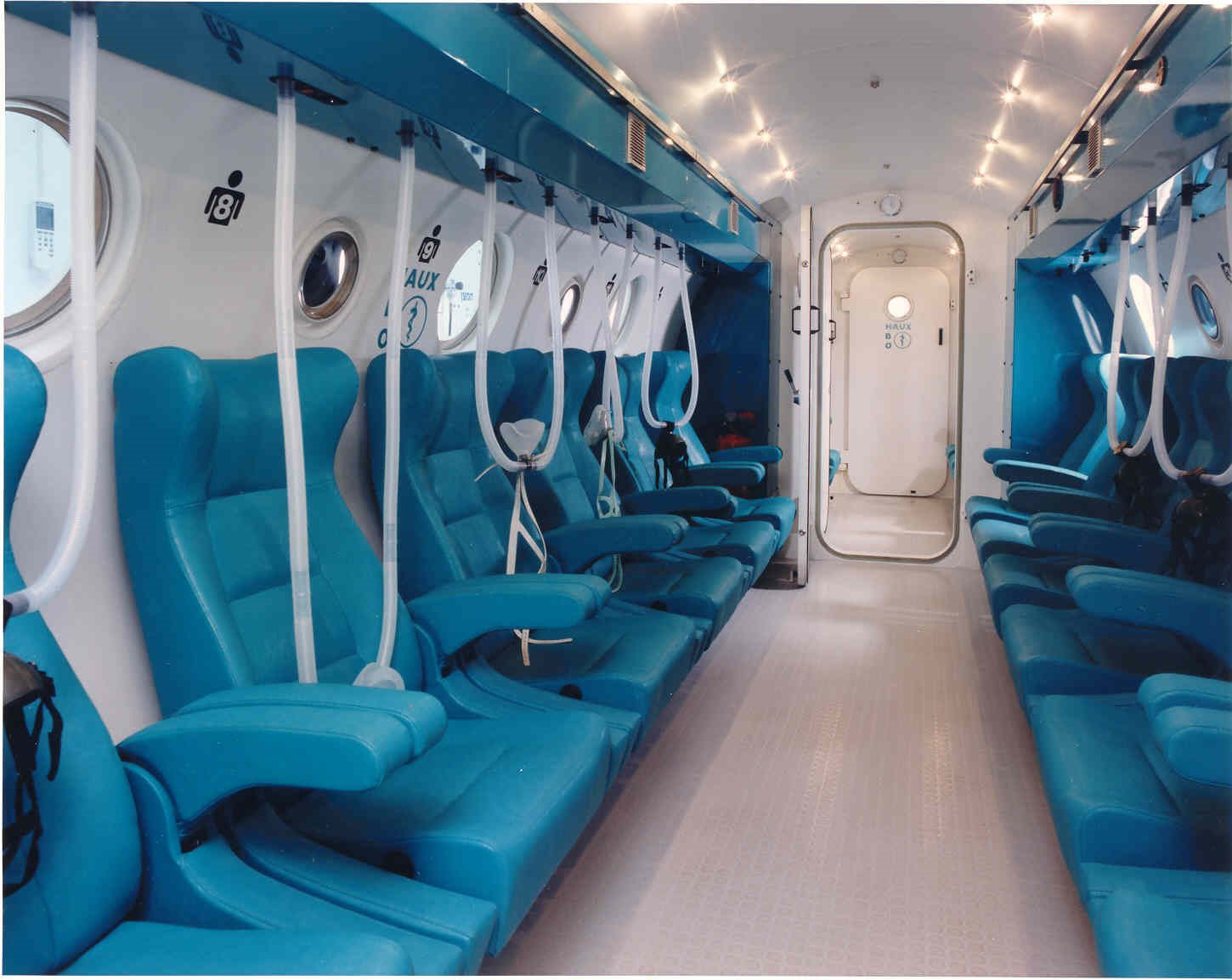
The Hyperbaric Oxygen Treatment Center

Elisha Medical Center houses several specialized units, notably the Hyperbaric Oxygen Treatment Center.

In April 2014, Gennady Kernes, the mayor of Kharkiv in Ukraine, was treated at Elisha Medical Center after surviving an assassination attempt.
