= Yoseftal Medical Center =

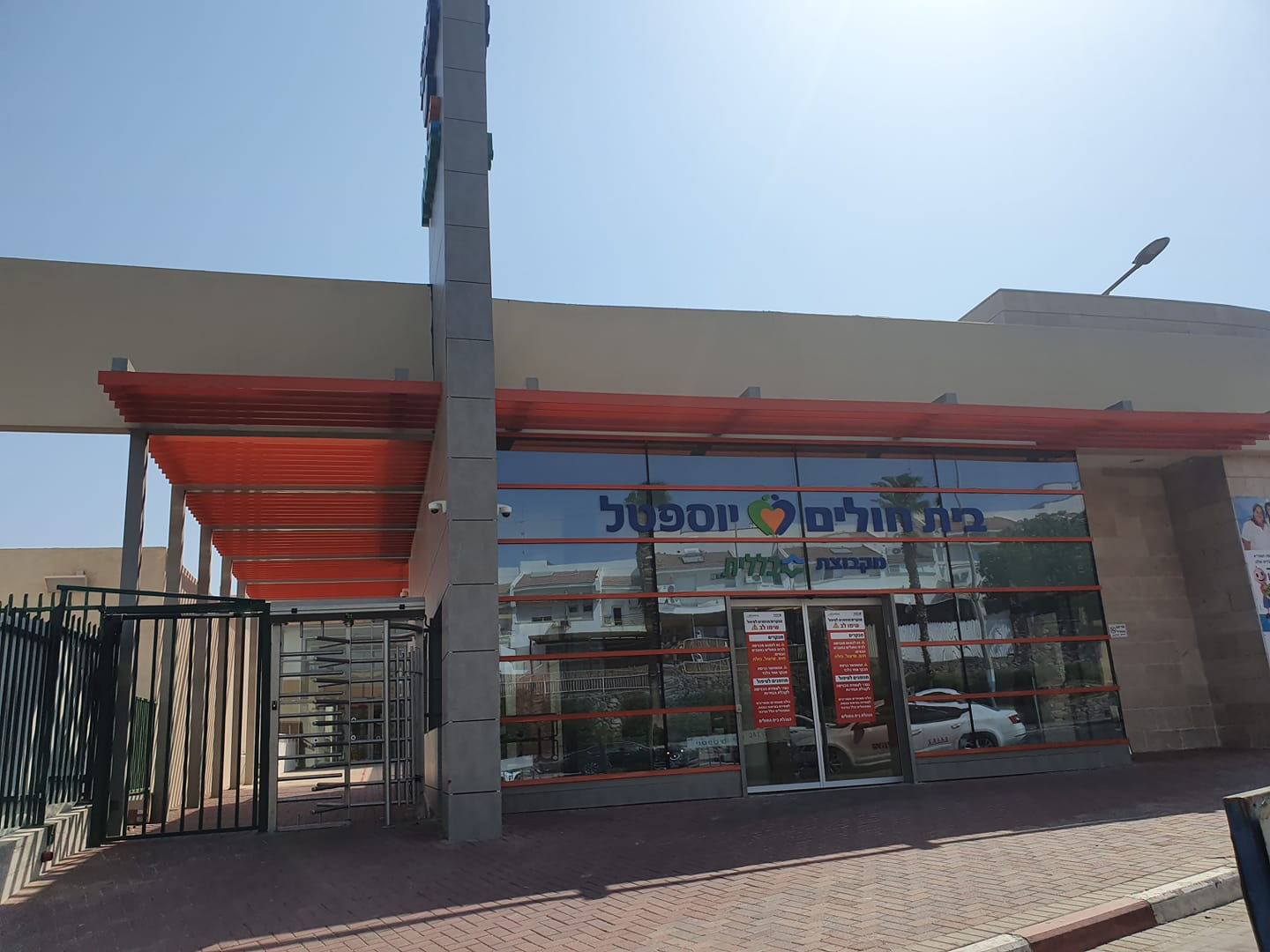

Geography
- Location: Eilat, Israel
- Coordinates: 29°33′16″N 34°56′26″E

Organisation
- Type: General hospital
- Network: Clalit Health Services

Services
- Emergency department: yes
- Beds: 68

History
- Opened: 1968

Links
- Website: hospitals.clalit.co.il/hospitals/joseftal
- Lists: Hospitals in Israel

Yoseftal Medical Center (Hebrew: הַמֶּרְכָּז הָרְפוּאִי יוֹסֵפְטַל) is a hospital in Eilat, Israel.

Yoseftal Hospital, founded in 1968, is the southernmost hospital in Israel and the only hospital covering the southern Negev desert. It is named after Giora Yoseftal. It is Israel's smallest general hospital with 65 beds. It has an emergency department with 30 treatment stations, including special pediatric stations, two isolation units, and a triage area. In addition, it has a fully equipped recompression chamber for treating diving accidents. The hospital also has kidney dialysis facilities open to vacationers and local residents.

Economic problems led to proposals for the hospital's closure; however, after protests from area residents and local government officials, who argued that not having a hospital within a 3-hour radius would be highly dangerous, it was decided to keep the hospital open. The hospital is run by the Clalit health fund.
