= Eli Gross =

Israeli designer

- אלי גרוס
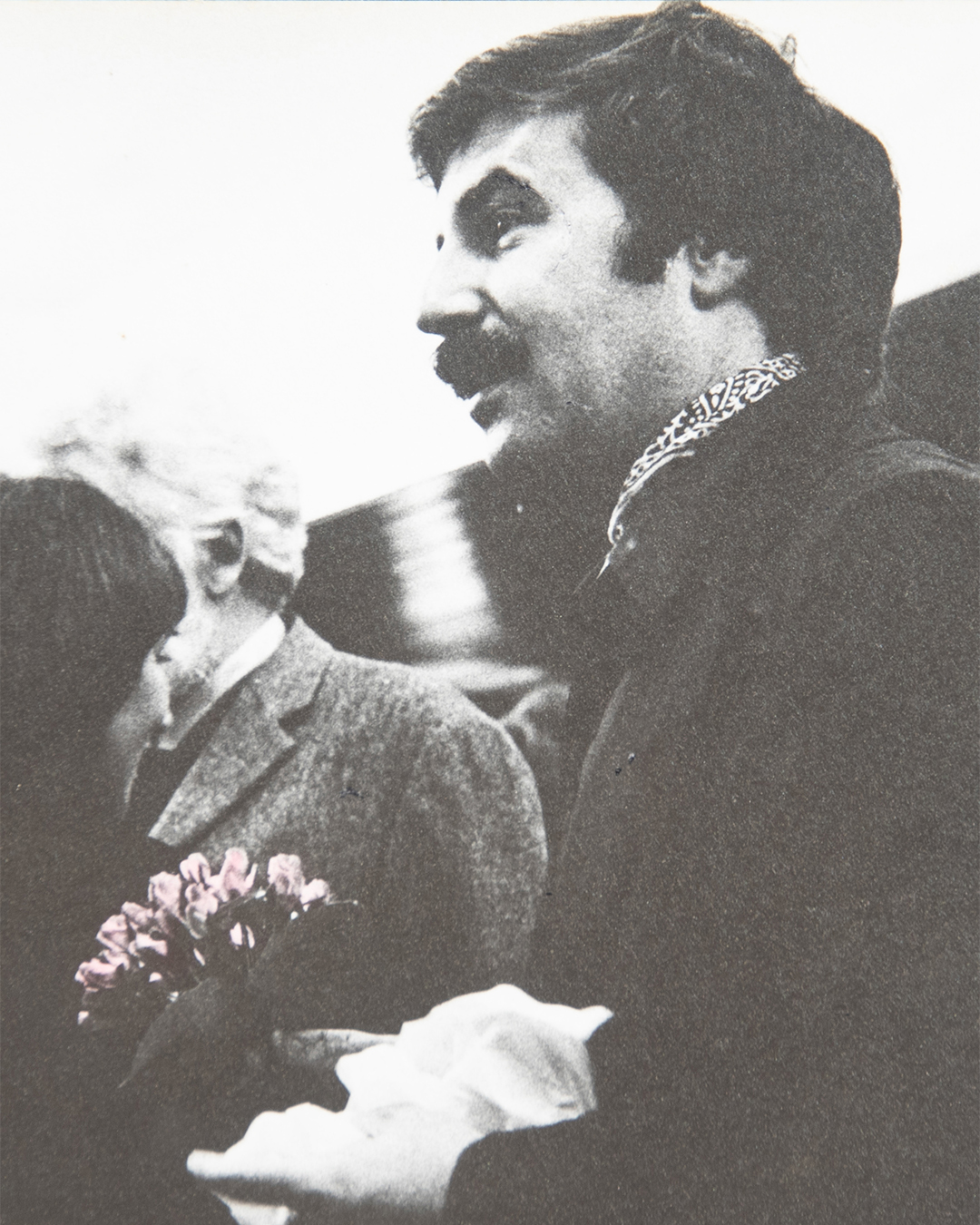
- Eli Gross at his wedding in the Netherlands
- Born: 1939; Haifa, British Mandate
- Died: 1996 (aged 56–57); Tel Aviv, Israel
- Occupations: Graphic designer and Typographer
- Years active: 1966–1994
- Children: 2

Eli Gross (1939–1996) (Hebrew: אלי גרוס) was an Israeli graphic designer and typographer, and one of the leading figures among the generation of designers who introduced the Swiss style and the concept of total design to Israel. Gross worked in both the Netherlands and Israel and was involved in major projects shaping the visual identity of public institutions in Israel.

== Biography ==
Gross was born in Haifa in 1939. After completing his military service and working at Israel Shipyards, he moved to the Netherlands, where he studied graphic design and typography at the Royal Academy of Art in The Hague from 1962 to 1966. In 1969, he joined the studio Total Design in Amsterdam, where he worked for team Wim Crouwel and team Benno Wissing. He assisted on large-scale projects such as the signage system for Schiphol Airport, the logo for the City of Rotterdam, and the design of the Dutch Pavilion at Expo '70 in Osaka, Japan.

In 1972, he returned to Israel and established an independent studio in Tel Aviv called "E. Gross Designers Ltd." Among the projects he carried out were:

- Design of the visual identity for Bank Leumi
- Design of mailboxes for the Israel Postal Authority
- Signage system and logo for the Tel Aviv Central Bus Station a project that started in Total Design in 1968
- Design of the original red logo for Clalit Health Services
- Signage system design for Ben Gurion International Airport
- Signage system design for Hadassah Medical Center
- Signage system design for the Technion – Israel Institute of Technology
- Signage system design for the Hebrew University of Jerusalem, Mount Scopus campus
- Signage systems for the National Insurance Institute of Israel
- Logo and signage system for Gan Ha’ir shopping center
- Logo and signage system for Shaare Zedek Medical Center
- Logo and signage design for Carmel Medical Center
- Logo design for the Jewish Museum Vienna
- Logo design for Klal Center
- Logo design for Mediterranean Towers (Migdalei HaYam HaTichon)
- Design of an artist's book for Samuel Bak

In 1973, Gross joined the faculty at Bezalel as a senior lecturer in the Department of Graphic Design, where he taught typography. In 1975, he was appointed senior lecturer at the Faculty of Architecture and Town Planning at the Technion.

== Style and influence ==
Gross is associated with the International Typographic Style, also known as the "Swiss Style." This design approach is characterized by the use of a strict grid system, sans-serif typefaces such as Helvetica and Univers, and left-aligned text—or right-aligned in the case of the Hebrew alphabet. More specifically, Gross is identified with the Dutch dialect of Swiss design.

Curator Ran Shechori described Gross as "the kind of director who does not emphasize himself, whose great achievement is expressed in everything flowing as if by itself," calling him "the loyal successor of the modern movement, which championed humanism, functionality, rationality, and the aspiration for universality, to bridge cultural, national, ethnic, and linguistic gaps."

Prof. Yarom Vardimon wrote that Gross would "resolutely integrate the spirit of the international style into his work—without defining it as such—and out of a belief in the righteousness of the path: 'In this small world [Israel], it is important that we know how to speak the language of others. Israel is closed off in its local orientation; we must expose ourselves to dialogue at an international level.'"

Gross consistently employed the Hebrew sans-serif typefaces Oron and Narkis Tam, often paired with lowercase Latin letters such as Univers and Helvetica.

== Awards and recognition ==
In 1980, Gross received a special commendation for his design of the visual identity for Bank Leumi le-Israel, as part of the 1979 "Otot" Awards for outstanding works in the field of advertising in Israel.

In 1977, Gross was awarded the Sandberg Grant for Research by the Israel Museum in Jerusalem, together with architect Saadia Mendel, for the development of a multifunctional urban column integrating various public functions such as a traffic light, mailbox, street lighting, and more.

In 1975, Gross won the Art Book Competition held by the Israel Museum in Jerusalem for designing a book for Samuel Bak.

== Exhibitions ==
- In 1975, together with Mike Felheim, head of the Department of Graphic Design at Bezalel Academy of Arts and Design in Jerusalem and Arthur Goldreich, Gross curated and designed the exhibition "Bezalel + 70" at the Helena Rubinstein Pavilion of the Tel Aviv Museum of Art.
- In 1994, a small retrospective exhibition of Eli Gross's works was held at the Ramat Gan Museum of Israeli Art under the title "Chaos Meets Order." The exhibition was curated by Yarom Vardimon and Victor Prostig.
