= Dan Gaton =

Israeli ophthalmologist

- דן גטון
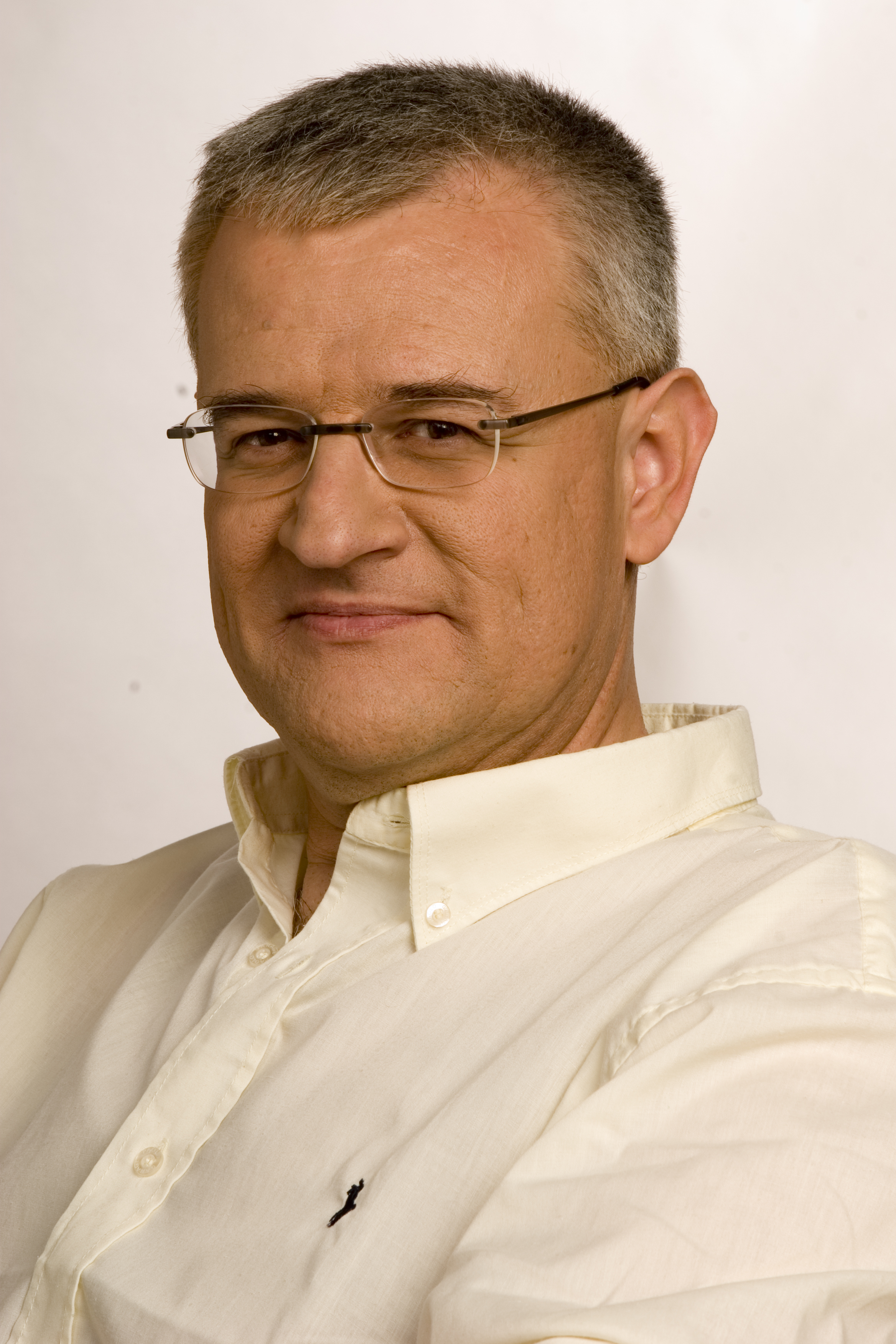
- Born: 1958 (age 67–68)
- Parent: Edith Gaton
- Scientific career
- Fields: Ophthalmology
- Institutions: Tel Aviv University

Dan Gaton (Hebrew: דן גטון) is an ophthalmologist with a subspecialty in Glaucoma, optic nerves, visual fields and intraocular pressure. During his career and after his professional training in San Diego, California, Gaton has held many positions, including: Director of Ophthalmology Clinics at Rabin Medical Center, deputy director of Beilinson Hospital, Chairman of the Israeli Glaucoma Society, Head of the Department of Ophthalmology, Tel Aviv University, Chairman of the Israeli Ophthalmological Society (IOS) and Head of the Institute for International Scientific Exchanges in Medical Sciences (IISEMS), Tel Aviv University. Gaton has been the Director of the Clalit Health Services Glaucoma Institute in Tel Aviv for many years, is a senior ophthalmologist at Beilinson Hospital and has been appointed Full Professor of Clinical Ophthalmology at the Sackler Faculty of Medicine, Tel Aviv University.

His studies deal mostly with clinical aspects of Glaucoma, but some also involve techniques of pathology and histopathology.

== Publications ==
=== Books ===
- General Pathology. Gaton E, Gaton DD, Czerikover, Tel Aviv, Israel, 1st Edition, 1984, 397p., 2nd Edition, 1987, 397p.
- Specific Pathology I. Gaton E, Gaton DD, Czerikover, Tel Aviv, Israel, 1994, 400p.
- Abbreviations in Medicine, English and Hebrew. Gaton DD, Gaton E., Czerikover, Tel Aviv, Israel, 1st Edition, 1996, 256p; 2nd Edition, 1999, 242p.
- Specific Pathology II. Gaton E, Gaton DD, Czerikover, Tel Aviv, Israel, 1998, 450p.
- Specific Pathology III. Gaton DD, Gaton E, Czerikover, Tel Aviv, Israel, 2005, 333p.

=== Selected articles ===
- Are the effects of thyroid hormones on target organs mediated through lysosomal enzymes? A histochemical study with acid phosphatase. Gaton DD, Gaton E, Wolman M. Cellular Molecular Biology. 1987;33(5):619-624.
- The pituitary-thyroid axis effects on ocular and orbital tissues: A histological, histochemical and morphometric study. Gaton DD, Gaton E, Wolman M. Acta Histochem. 1992;92(1):61-66.
- Toxic effects of systemic retinoids on meibomian glands. Kremer I, Gaton DD, David M, Gaton E, Shapiro A. Ophthalmic Res. 1994;26(2):124-128.
- The novel Y371D myocilin mutation causes an aggressive form of juvenile open-angle glaucoma in a Caucasian family from the Middle East. Avisar I, Lusky M, Robinson A, Shohat M, Dubois S, Raymond V, Gaton DD. Mol Vis. 2009; 24; 15:1945-1950.
- Effect of repeated applanation tonometry on the accuracy of intraocular pressure measurements. Gaton DD, Ehrenberg M, Lusky M, Wussuki-Lior O, Dotan G, Weinberger D, Snir M. Curr Eye Res. 2010; Jun 35(6):475-479.
- Effects of job-related stress and burnout on asthenopia among high-tech workers. Ostrovsky A, Ribak J, Pereg A, Gaton D. Ergonomics. 2012;55(8):854-862.
- CO₂ laser welding of corneal cuts with albumin solder using radiometric temperature control. Strassmann E, Livny E, Loya N, Kariv N, Ravid A, Katzir A, Gaton DD. Ophthalmic Res. 2013;50(3):174-179.
- Corneal cut closure using temperature-controlled CO2 laser soldering system. Tal K, Strassmann E, Loya N, Ravid A, Kariv N, Weinberger D, Katzir A, Gaton DD. Lasers Med Sci. 2015; May;30(4):1367-1371.
- Blood-Flow Velocity in Glaucoma Patients Measured with the Retinal Function Imager. Burgansky-Eliash Z, Bartov E, Barak A, Grinvald A, Gaton D. Curr Eye Res. 2016; Jul;41(7):965-970.
- Short-term anterior chamber inflammation in phacoemulsification with and without Ex-Press glaucoma implant. Graffi S, Tiosano B, Naftali M, Nakhoul N, Mimouni M, Hanna R, Gaton DD. Eur J Ophthalmol. 2020; May;30:533-537.
- Diagnosis of pseudoexfoliation syndrome in pseudophakic patients. Sternfeld A, Luski M, Sella R, Zahavi A, Geffen N, Pereg A, Megiddo E, Gaton D. Ophthalmic Res. 2020;Apr 30. Epub ahead of print.
- Cost containment by peer prior authorization program for second line treatment in patients with retinal disease. Rosenblatt A, Hekselman I, Rosenblatt I, Hekselman I, Gaton D. Israel J Health Policy Res. 2021; 10:4-9.
