= Shlomi Codish =

Israeli physician and healthcare administrator (born 1966)

- שלומי קודש
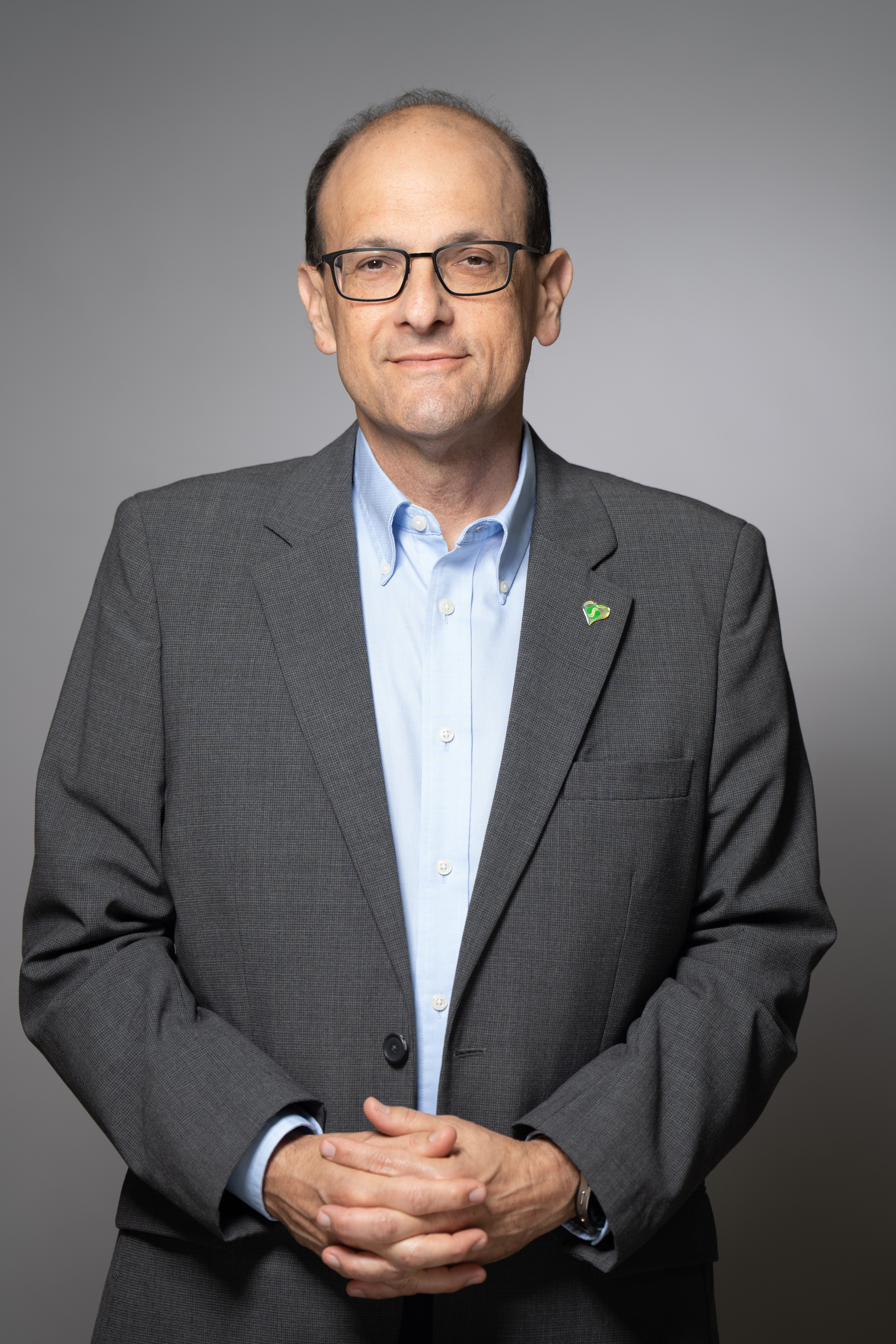
- Shlomi Codish, <2023>
- Born: November 17, 1966 (age 59); Fairfield, Iowa, U.S.
- Occupations: Physician; Healthcare administrator; Academic
- Employer: Soroka Medical Center
- Title: Director General, Soroka University Medical Center

Shlomi Codish (Hebrew: שלומי קודש; born November 17, 1966) is an Israeli physician and healthcare administrator who is CEO of Soroka University Medical Center, the largest hospital in southern Israel and the only Level-1 trauma center in the region. He is an Associate Professor at Ben-Gurion University of the Negev.

== Early life and education ==
Codish earned his B.Med.Sc. (1994), MD (1995) and MPH (2016) from Ben-Gurion University of the Negev, completing his residency in internal medicine at Soroka Medical Center in 2001. He subsequently undertook postdoctoral training in medical informatics at Yale University from 2004 to 2006.

== Career ==
Codish held several senior leadership positions before his current role, including Deputy Director General of Soroka Medical Center (2007–2015), Director of Medical Informatics at Clalit Health Services (2006–2007), and Medical Director of Clalit’s Southern District (2015–2018). In 2018, he was appointed Director General of Soroka University Medical Center.

=== Emergency leadership ===
During the October 7, 2023 attacks, Codish led Soroka’s emergency operations, managing what was described as the largest mass-casualty incident in Israeli medical history. Under his direction, the hospital treated over 4,400 casualties, including more than 3,300 wounded soldiers. His leadership was widely covered in international media.

In June 2025, following an Iranian missile strike on Soroka, Codish and the hospital’s staff maintained emergency services despite significant damage to facilities. The incident was reported by JNS, with U.S. Ambassador Mike Huckabee praising the staff’s actions as “testaments to the resilient spirit of Israel and its people.”

== Awards and honors ==
- 2001 – Ronen Prize for Outstanding Internal Medicine Resident, Soroka University Medical Center.
- 2014 – Outstanding Lecturer, Ben-Gurion University of the Negev.
- 2016 – Outstanding Lecturer, Guilford Glazer Faculty of Business and Management, Ben-Gurion University of the Negev (student teaching-quality awards).
- 2016 – Glatt Prize for Excellence in Teaching, Ben-Gurion University of the Negev.
- 2026 – Pioneers Award (Ot HaHalutzim), awarded by the World Sephardi Federation.
- 2026 – Yakir Be’er Sheva (Distinguished Citizen of Be’er Sheva).

== Institutional recognition ==
Under Codish’s leadership, Soroka received:

- 2022, 2025 – Clalit “Outstanding Hospital of the Year” awarded to Soroka University Medical Center.
- 2024 – President’s Award (Ben-Gurion University) awarded to Soroka and its director for outstanding commitment in the Negev.
- 2024 – Jerusalem Post “Resilience and Courage” Honor awarded to Soroka Medical Center.
- 2024 – Soroka won two “Shield of the Minister of Health for Volunteering” awards.
- 2025 – Yigal Alon Award awarded to Soroka Medical Center as a social pioneering act in caring for IDF casualties and residents of southern Israel.

== Academic contributions ==
Codish is an Associate Professor in the Faculty of Health Sciences at Ben-Gurion University of the Negev. Key research areas include health services, emergency preparedness and medical informatics. He is an author of over 50 peer reviewed articles.

== Personal life ==
Codish lives in Meitar and is married to Iris, a pediatrician, and they have three children.
