= Edith Gaton =

Israeli pediatrician and pathologist

- אדית גאטון
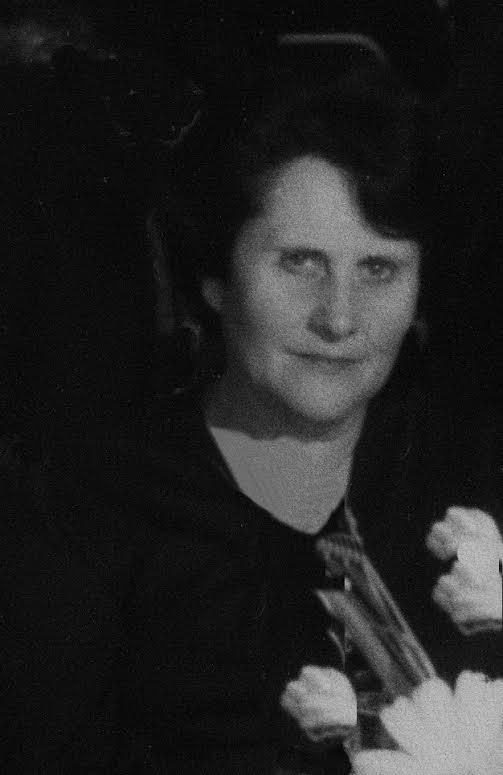
- Born: Edith Filomena Gaton; April 27, 1924
- Died: April 14, 2015 (aged 90)
- Relatives: Professor Dan Gaton (son)
- Medical career
- Profession: Pediatrician, pathologist, professor
- Institutions: Tel Aviv University
- Research: Pathology

Edith Filomena Gaton (Hebrew: אדית גאטון; April 27, 1924 - April 14, 2015) was an Israeli pediatrician and pathologist. She was a professor of Pathology and Head of the Department of Pathology at Tel Aviv University, senior pathologist and Head of the Histochemistry Unit at Kaplan Hospital in Rehovot. Gaton was an educator and lecturer, author of textbooks in the field of medicine and researcher. Her research focused in the field of atherosclerosis and arteriosclerosis and has formed the basis for many research studies in the field.

== Research ==
At the height of her scientific career in the field of pathology, the main research in which Gaton focused on the study of atherosclerosis. As part of her research, she examined the importance of various components and causes of the disease using histochemical and immunohistological methods. In her scientific work she discovered the importance of macrophages in the stage of fat deposition in the artery wall, is the basic stage of disease formation. She also recognized the great importance of the acid-esterase enzyme and its activity in the vascular wall. In addition, she focused on the field of the female reproductive system, both in teaching the field to students as well as in research aspects. In this studies she dealt with hormonal effects on various tumors in the female reproductive system with emphasis on ovarian tumors.

== Publications ==
=== Selected books ===
- General Pathology. Gaton E, Gaton DD, Czerikover, Tel Aviv, Israel, 1st Edition, 1984, 397p., 2nd Edition, 1987, 397p.
- Specific Pathology I. Gaton E, Gaton DD, Czerikover., Tel Aviv, Israel. 1994, 400p.
- Abbreviations in Medicine, English and Hebrew. Gaton DD, Gaton E., Czerikover, Tel Aviv, Israel, 1st Edition, 1996, 256p; 2nd Edition, 1999, 242p.
- Specific Pathology II. Gaton E, Gaton DD, Czerikover, Tel Aviv, Israel, 1998, 450p.
- Specific Pathology III. Gaton DD, Gaton E, Czerikover, Tel Aviv, Israel, 2005, 333p.
- Crâmpeie din Viață. Edit and Radu Gaton, by Teşu Edition, Romania & Israel, 2017, 249 p.

=== Selected publications ===
- Toxic effects of systemic retinoids on meibomian glands. Kremer I, Gaton DD, David M, Gaton E, Shapiro A. Ophthalmic Res. 1994; 26 (2): 124–8.
- The pituitary-thyroid axis effects on ocular and orbital tissues: a histological, histochemical, and morphometric study. Gaton DD, Gaton E, Wolman M, Acta Histochem. 1992; 92 (1): 61–6.
- Reappraisal of the role of macrophages in the pathogenesis of atherosclerosis. Wolman M, Gaton E, Pathobiology. 1991; 59 (2): 92–5.
- Are the effects of thyroid hormone on target organs mediated through lysosomal enzymes? A histochemical study with acid phosphatase. Gaton DD, Gaton E, Wolman M, Cellular Molecular Biology. 1987; 33 (5): 619–24.
- Macrophage activation in the prevention or regression of atherosclerosis. Gaton E, Wolman M, Adv Exp Med Biol. 1984; 168: 15–36.
- The effects of varying lengths and powers of CO2 laser pulses transmitted through an optical fiber on atherosclerotic plaques. Eldar M, Battler A, Gal D, Rath S, Rotstein Z, Neufeld HN, Akselrod S, Katzir A, Gaton E, Wolman M, Clinical Cardiology. 1986 Mar; 9 (3): 89–91.
- The effect of estrogen and gestagen on the mucus production of human endocervical cells: a histochemical study. Gaton E, Zejdel L, Bernstein D, Glezerman M, Czernobilsky B, Insler V, Fertil Steril. 1982 Nov; 38 (5): 580–5.
- Unusual ovarian, tubal and pelvic mesothelial inclusions in patients with endometriosis. Kerner H, Gaton E, Czernobilsky B, Histopathology. 1981 May; 5 (3): 277–83.
- Histochemical study on the pathogenesis of chlorocyclizine-induced pulmonary lipidosis. Gaton E, Wolman M, Histochemistry. 1979 Sep; 63 (2): 203–7.
- Macrophages and smooth muscle cells in the pathogenesis of atherosclerosis. Wolman M, Gaton E, Harefuah, May 2, 1976
- The role of smooth muscle cells and hematogenous macrophages in atheroma. Gaton E, Wolman M., J Pathol. October 1977
- Editorial: The role of enzyme histochemistry in modern pathology. Gaton E, Harefuah, December 2, 1973
