= Marek Glezerman =

Israeli obstetrician and gynecologist

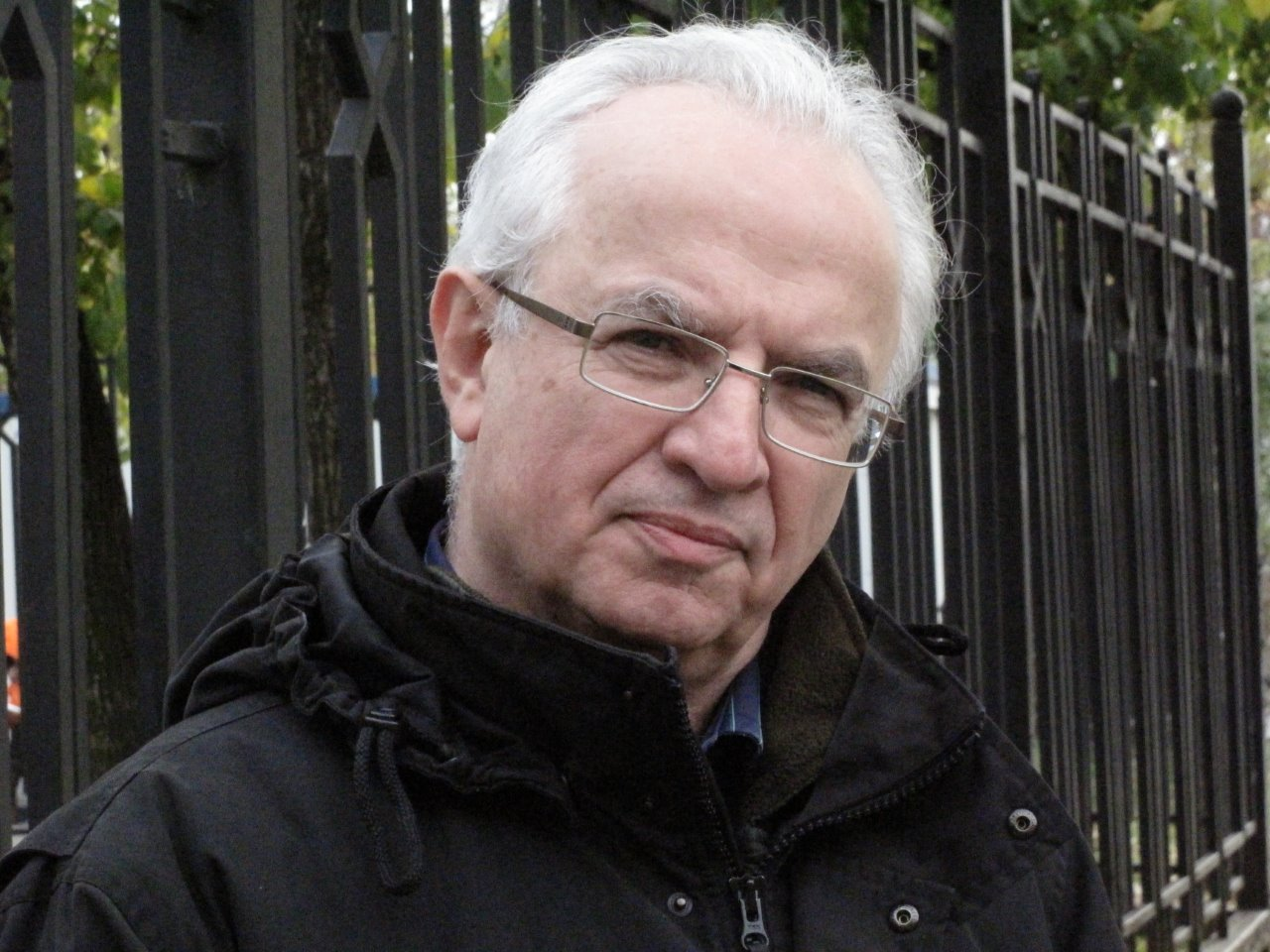
Marek Glezerman

Marek Glezerman (Hebrew: מארק גלזרמן; born January 1, 1945) is an Israeli obstetrician and gynecologist, Professor Emeritus of Obstetrics and Gynecology, head of Gender and Sex Conscious Medicine and immediate past chair of the Ethics Committee at the Faculty of Medicine, Tel Aviv University. He is the founding president of The Israel Society for Gender and Sex Conscious Medicine and past president of the International Society of Gender Medicine. Glezerman is also a member of the Ministry of Health's National Council for Obstetrics and Gynecology, Genetics and Perinatology. Prof. Glezerman is internationally considered one of the pioneers of Gender and Sex Conscious Medicine.

== Medical career ==
Glezerman studied Medicine at Goethe University in Frankfurt, Germany, and at the Université de Paris, France. In the early 70s, he immigrated to Israel and settled in Tel Aviv. After approximately two years as a Ford Foundation Fellow at the Institute of Endocrinology at Sheba Medical Center, he completed his residency in Obstetrics and Gynecology at the Zahalon Hospital in Jaffa, followed by a fellowship in pelvic surgery at the Women's Klinikum in Munich.

After returning to Israel, he moved to Beer Sheba, joined the senior staff at Soroka Medical Center, and was in charge of the gynecological services and the gynecological operating theater. In 1984/1985, he did a gynecological oncology and pelvic surgery fellowship at the Rush University Medical Center in Chicago and Hôpital Notre-Dame in Montreal, Canada. Upon his return to the Soroka Medical Center, he founded and headed the unit of Gynecological Oncology. He also founded and directed the Urologic-Gynecologic service and later the Assisted Reproductive Technology unit. He also developed and introduced a novel Continuous Quality Improvement System, which became a nationwide model for other medical centers.

In 1989, Glezerman was appointed chairman of Obstetrics and Gynecology at Ben Gurion University and the Soroka Medical Center, positions which he held until 1997. In 1992, he spent a sabbatical dedicated to Andrology at the Justus Liebig University Hospital in Giessen, Germany, and during 1996/1997, a sabbatical dedicated to basic research on ovarian function at the Weizmann Institute of Science in Rehovot, Israel. In 1997, he was appointed chair of the Department of Obstetrics and Gynecology at the Wolfson Medical Center in Holon, where he also established, together with Dr. Sigi Rotmensch, the first Center for Treatment of Sexual Assault Victims which has become a nationwide role model. In 2003, he spent a sabbatical dedicated to Gynecologic Oncological surgery at the Rechts der Isar Hospital in Munich, and in 2005, he was appointed to head the departments of Obstetrics and Gynecology at the Rabin Medical Center, which includes the Beilinson Hospital and the Hasharon Hospital. In parallel, he served as deputy director of the Rabin Medical Center. After his retirement in 2012, he founded the Research Center for Gender Medicine at the Rabin Medical Center, which he directed until 2022. He also served in parallel for fourteen years as chair of the National Steering Committee of Obstetrics and Gynecology at the Maccabi Healthcare Services.

== Academic career ==
In 1986, Glezerman was appointed associate professor at Ben-Gurion University in Beer Sheba, Israel, and became a full professor in 1991. He also served as vice dean of the Faculty of Health Sciences and vice director of the Post Graduate School of Medicine at Ben-Gurion University. He served as the Deichman-Lerner Chair of Obstetrics and Gynecology at the Ben-Gurion University and later, after moving to Tel Aviv, as a full professor and the Emma Fein Chair for Obstetrics and Gynecology at Tel Aviv University.

== Research and medical publications ==
Glezerman has written/edited eight books on Human Reproduction and Gender and Sex Conscious Medicine. He has published over 340 scientific papers and book chapters on fertility, obstetrics, gynecology, and Gender and Sex Conscious Medicine.

=== Books ===
- Lunenfeld and V. Insler in collaboration with M. Glezerman. Diagnosis and Treatment of Infertility. Grosse Verlag, Berlin, 1978.
- Lunenfeld B. Glezerman M. Diagnose und Therapie, männlicher Fertilitätsstörungen. Grosse Verlag, Berlin, 1981.
- Glezerman M. Jecht E. (eds.). Varicocele and Male Infertility II. Springer, Berlin-Heidelberg-New York-Tokyo, 1984.
- Lunenfeld B., Insler V. Glezerman M. Diagnosis and treatment of functional infertility. Completely revised edition. Berliner Medizinische Verlagsanstalt, Berlin, 1993.
- Glezerman M. The quest for the self-evident – Gender Specific Medicine (Hebrew). Modan Publisher, Tel Aviv, 2014.
- Glezerman M. Gender Medicine. Overlook, New York, NY, 2016.
- Legato M.J., M. Glezerman (eds.). The International Society for Gender Medicine. History and Highlights. Elsevier, London, 2017.
- Legato M.J., Feldberg D. Glezerman M. Sex, Gender and Epigenetics. Elsevier, New York, NY, 2023.

=== Scientific papers and chapters in text books ===
Over 250 scientific papers in peer reviewed journals and 90 chapters in medical books.

== Recognitions ==
Glezerman received multiple recognitions for excellence in teaching from Ben Gurion University in Beer Sheba and Tel Aviv University. In 2010, he received the Athena Award from The Foundation for Gendered Medicine for "Leadership In The Science of Gender-Specific Medicine".

== Private life ==
Marek Glezerman lives in Tel Aviv, Israel, and is married to Zvia. The couple has three daughters and five grandchildren.
