= Ze'ev Zrizi =

Israeli politician (1916–2011)

- זאב זריזי
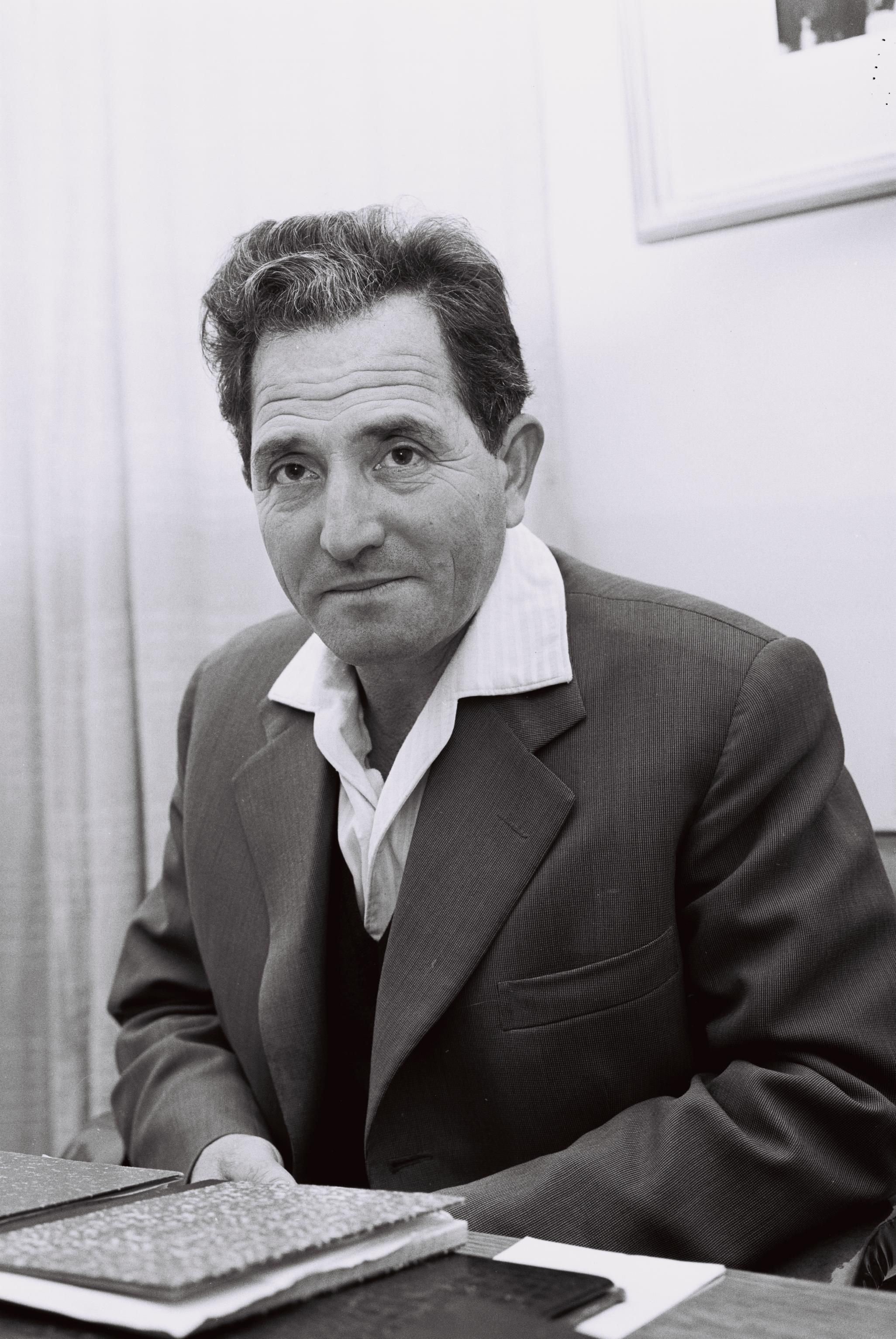

2nd Mayor of Beersheba
- In office 1961–1963
- Preceded by: David Tuviyahu
- Succeeded by: Eliyahu Nawi

Personal details
- Born: 1916 Wyszków, Poland
- Died: 3 August 2011 (aged 94–95) Beersheba, Israel
- Political party: Mapam

Ze'ev Zrizi (Hebrew: זאב זריזי; 1916 – August 3, 2011) was an Israeli politician who was the second mayor of the city of Beersheba.

Zrizi was a member of the city council from 1949, representing Mapam. In 1961 after political changes within the city, the city council appointed him to replace founding Mayor David Tuviyahu.

In 1963, Zrizi was succeeded by Eliyahu Nawi, although he continued serving as Nawi's deputy in the ruling Mapai–Mapam coalition for nearly 20 years.
