= Quality function deployment =

Early stage product design and development technique

Quality function deployment (QFD) is a method developed in Japan beginning in 1966 to help transform the voice of the customer into engineering characteristics for a product. Yoji Akao, the original developer, described QFD as a "method to transform qualitative user demands into quantitative parameters, to deploy the functions forming quality, and to deploy methods for achieving the design quality into subsystems and component parts, and ultimately to specific elements of the manufacturing process." The author combined his work in quality assurance and quality control points with function deployment used in value engineering.

== House of quality ==
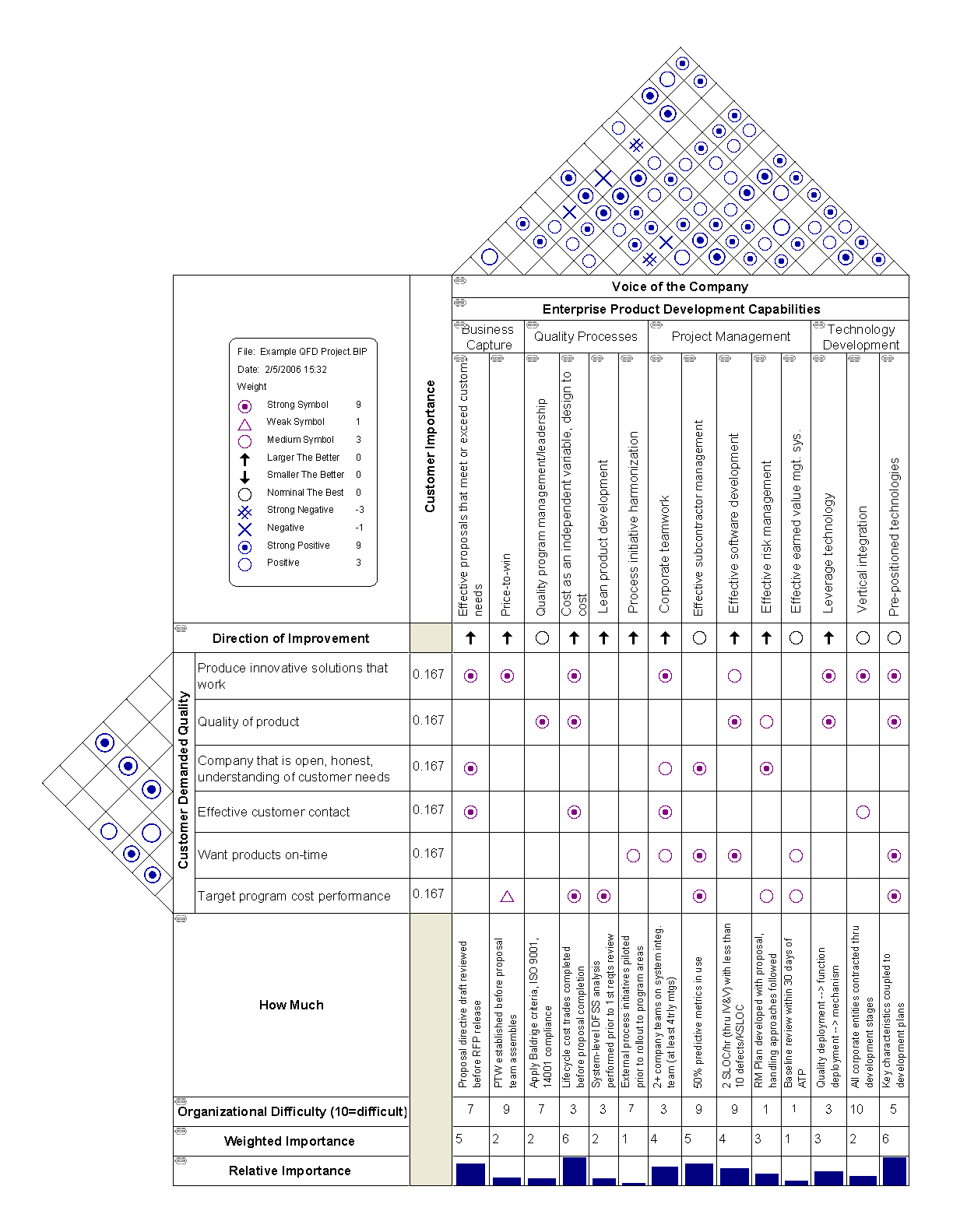
A house of quality for enterprise product development processes

The house of quality, a part of QFD, is the basic design tool of quality function deployment. It identifies and classifies customer desires (WHATs), identifies the importance of those desires, identifies engineering characteristics which may be relevant to those desires (HOWs), correlates the two, allows for verification of those correlations, and then assigns objectives and priorities for the system requirements. This process can be applied at any system composition level (e.g. system, subsystem, or component) in the design of a product, and can allow for assessment of different abstractions of a system. It is intensely progressed through a number of hierarchical levels of WHATs and HOWs and analyse each stage of product growth (service enhancement), and production (service delivery).

The house of quality appeared in 1972 in the design of an oil tanker by Mitsubishi Heavy Industries.

The output of the house of quality is generally a matrix with customer desires on one dimension and correlated nonfunctional requirements on the other dimension. The cells of matrix table are filled with the weights assigned to the stakeholder characteristics where those characteristics are affected by the system parameters across the top of the matrix. At the bottom of the matrix, the column is summed, which allows for the system characteristics to be weighted according to the stakeholder characteristics. System parameters not correlated to stakeholder characteristics may be unnecessary to the system design and are identified by empty matrix columns, while stakeholder characteristics (identified by empty rows) not correlated to system parameters indicate "characteristics not addressed by the design parameters". System parameters and stakeholder characteristics with weak correlations potentially indicate missing information, while matrices with "too many correlations" indicate that the stakeholder needs may need to be refined.

== Fuzziness ==
The concepts of fuzzy logic have been applied to QFD ("Fuzzy QFD" or "FQFD"). A review of 59 papers in 2013 by Abdolshah and Moradi found a number of conclusions: most FQFD "studies were focused on quantitative methods" to construct a house of quality matrix based on customer requirements, where the most-employed techniques were based on multiple-criteria decision analysis methods. They noted that there are factors other than the house of quality relevant to product development, and called metaheuristic methods "a promising approach for solving complicated problems of FQFD."

== Derived techniques and tools ==
The process of quality function deployment (QFD) is described in ISO 16355-1:2021. Pugh concept selection can be used in coordination with QFD to select a promising product or service configuration from among listed alternatives.

Modular function deployment uses QFD to establish customer requirements and to identify important design requirements with a special emphasis on modularity. There are three main differences to QFD as applied in modular function deployment compared to house of quality: The benchmarking data is mostly gone; the checkboxes and crosses have been replaced with circles, and the triangular "roof" is missing.
