= David Tuviyahu =

Israeli mayor (1898–1975)

- דוד טוביהו
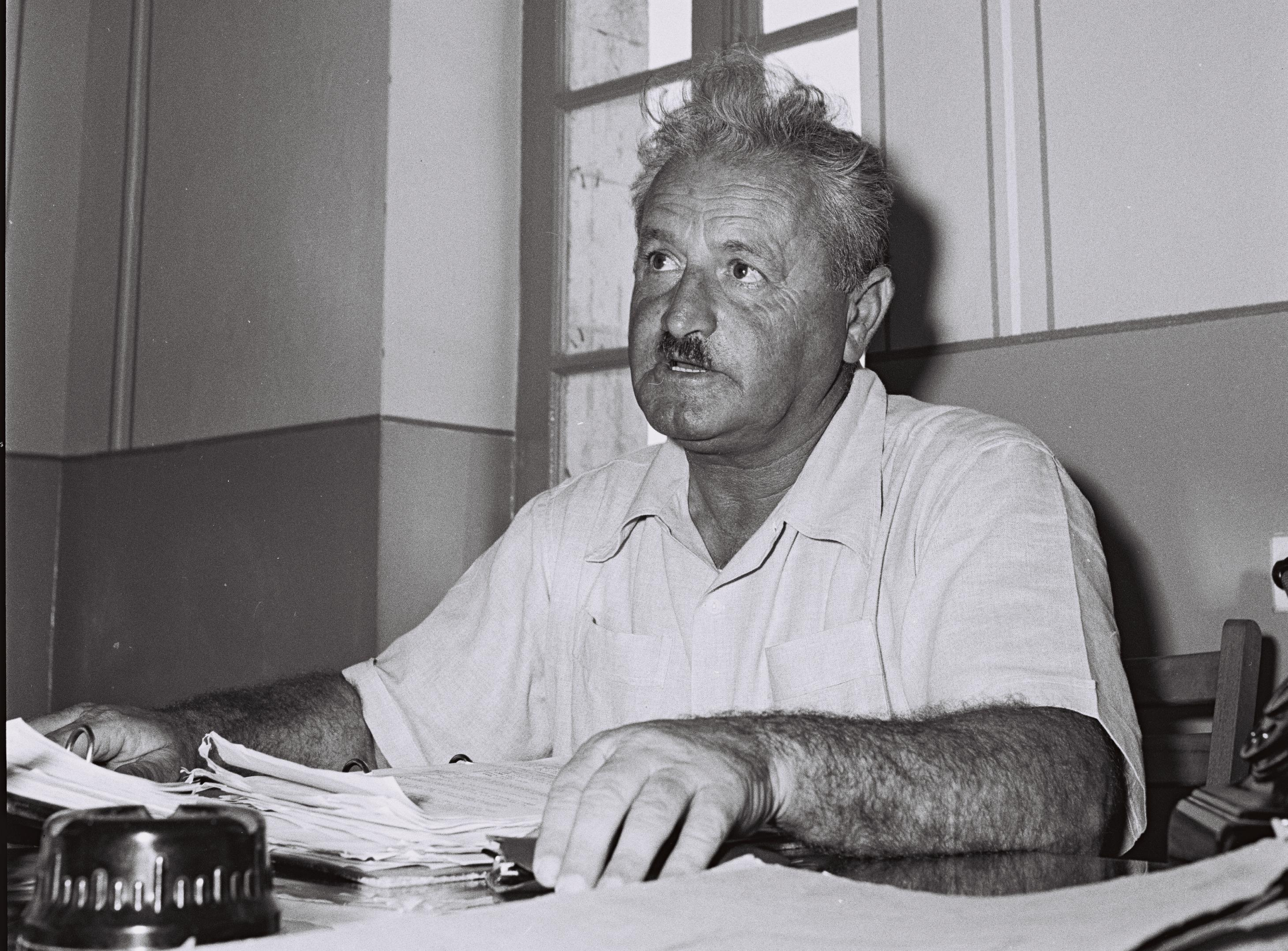

1st Mayor of Beersheba
- In office 1950–1961
- Succeeded by: Ze'ev Zrizi

Personal details
- Born: November 20, 1898 Zhovkva, Galicia, Austro-Hungary
- Died: 1975 (aged 76–77) Beersheba, Israel
- Party: Mapai
- Spouse: Leah Rothbart
- Parent: Joseph Taube (father)

David Tuviyahu (Hebrew: דוד טוביהו; 20 November 1898 – 1975) was an Israeli politician and trade unionist who served as the first mayor of the city of Beersheba after the establishment of the State of Israel.

== Biography ==
Tuviyahu was born in 1898 in Galicia, then part of the Austro-Hungarian empire. He immigrated to Mandatory Palestine in 1920, during the chiefly Eastern European Third Aliyah. There he worked in construction in the north of the country, including on the road between Afula and Nazareth, and was a member of Kibbutz Geva in the Jezreel Valley for seven years.

At various times, Tuviyahu worked as a foreman and as a manager for Solel Boneh, a construction company owned by the Histadrut trade union. By 1931 he was working on the construction site of the Palestine Electric Corporation's Naharayim power plant.

Tuviyahu was active in Mapai and the Histadrut, both powerful organisations associated with David Ben-Gurion's stream of Labor Zionism. Before the 1948 Israeli Declaration of Independence, he was involved in Zionist activities regarding the development of Jewish communities in the Negev: the 'three lookouts' and the 'eleven points.'

Tuviyahu was appointed mayor of Beersheba in 1950, taking over from military governor Michael Hanegbi. The small settlement together with its surroundings had been depopulated of most of its Arab inhabitants during the Arab–Israeli War, particularly after the battle of Beersheba, and was granted to Israel by the 1949 Armistice Agreements, after which it was elevated to a municipality. From a small town in the Negev desert, Tuviyahu oversaw the development and rapid expansion of the city, including its connection to the electricity grid and the national road network, mass housing programs for the many new immigrants (particularly from North Africa) who were living in nearby tent cities, and the construction of the Central Hospital of the Negev (now Soroka Medical Center), inaugurated in October 1959. During his municipal tenure, he travelled to the United States as part of a 1958 Histadrut trip.

In 1961, the city council replaced him with Ze'ev Zrizi, ending his political career. In subsequent years, he helped establish the Institute of Higher Education in the Negev, which would later form the basis of the Ben-Gurion University of the Negev. In 1964, he headed the Tel Aviv district of the Israel Land Administration.

One of Beersheba's main streets (heading west in the direction of Ofakim and Sderot) and one of its high schools are named after him.
