= Carmel Medical Center =

Carmel Medical Center מרכז רפואי כרמל
- Clalit Health Services
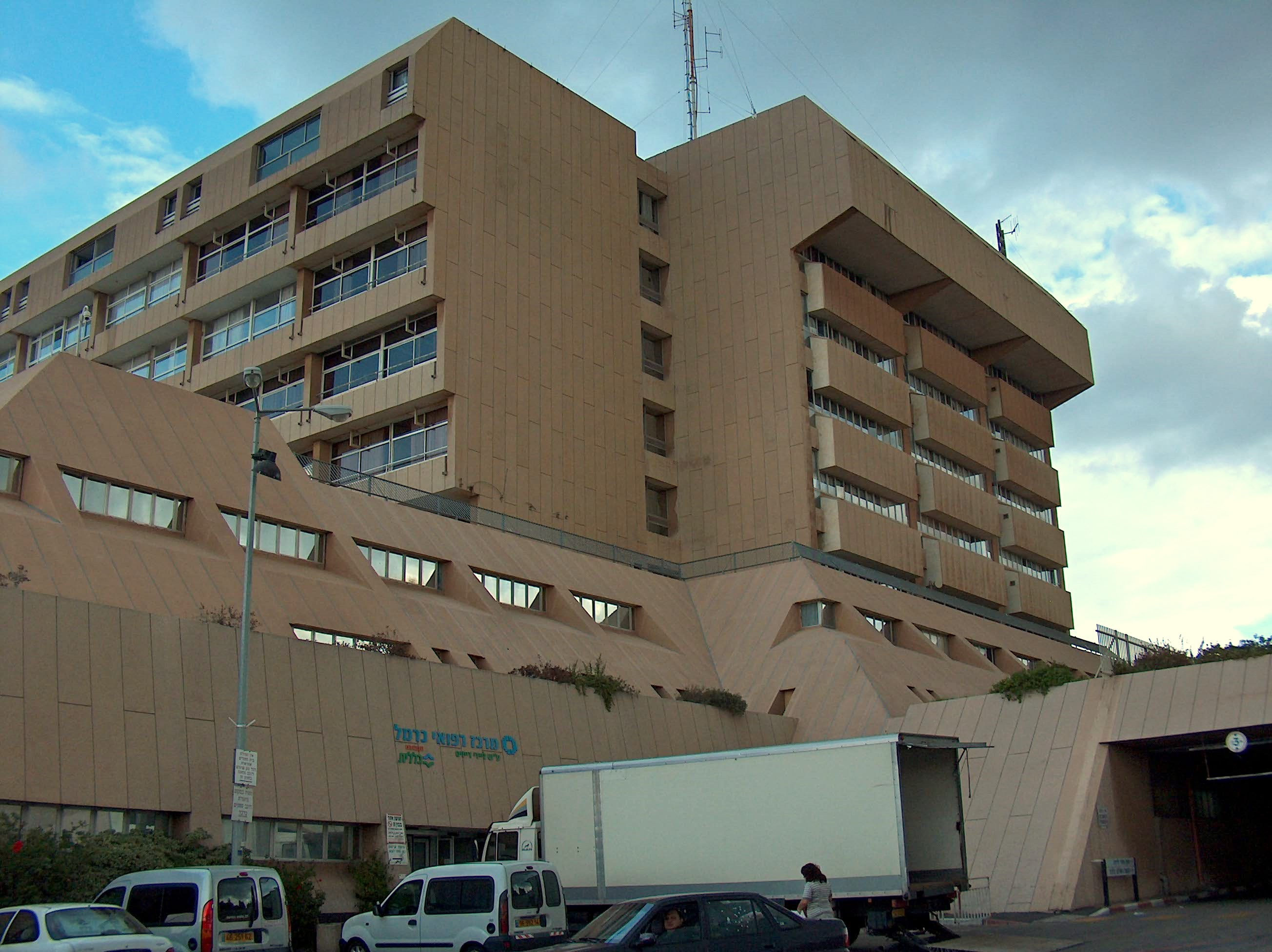
- The main building of Carmel Medical Center

Geography
- Location: Haifa, Israel
- Coordinates: 32.78675°N 34.98039°E

Organisation
- Type: Medical Center

Services
- Beds: 442

History
- Former name: Carmel Hospital
- Opened: 1945

Links
- Website: https://hospitals.clalit.co.il/carmel/en/Pages/default.aspx

Carmel Medical Center (Hebrew: מרכז רפואי כרמל, romanized: Merkaz Refoí Camrel; formerly Carmel Hospital) is a hospital located in the Ahuzat Shmuel neighborhood in Haifa, Israel. The hospital belongs to Clalit Health Services.

== History ==
The medical center was originally established in a building located at what is today Horev 2. The building was designed in 1935 by architect Moshe Gerstel, initially intended as a three-story hotel. However, due to unfolding events and the immigration of German Jews, it was repurposed as the 'German Immigrant Home' by the Association of Israelis of Central European origin. A large slipway for the defense forces was also planned on the site during construction.

During World War II, the immigrant home closed due to the cessation of immigration, and the site was purchased by Clalit Health Services with the intention of establishing a hospital for internal diseases. Dr. Gerhard Rosenkranz, who had immigrated to Israel from Germany in 1933, was the initiator of the hospital's establishment and served as its director for 25 years.

In 1976, the hospital's current main building, a 7-story structure on Michal Street designed by architect Yaakov Rechter, was inaugurated. Most of the hospital's departments relocated to this modern building, which has since served as the main facility. Around the same time, graphic designer Eli Gross created the hospital’s visual identity and way-finding system. He designed the logo by deriving it directly from the brutalist form of Rechter’s building, creating a ligature that merges the Latin letter ‘c’ with the Hebrew letter ‘כ’. The old building continues to be utilized, housing departments such as geriatrics, dialysis, outpatient clinics, community medicine, epidemiology, the center for multiple sclerosis and brain research, and the national cancer control center.

Following the Second Lebanon War, Carmel Medical Center established a new emergency room with reinforced concrete walls (60cm) to provide protection from missiles. This secure emergency room was inaugurated in mid-December 2011.

In 2023, the Ministry of Health announced that the medical center will relocate to a new building in Kiryat Ata, a city near Haifa, and will be named Menachem Begin Hospital".
