= Benno Wissing =

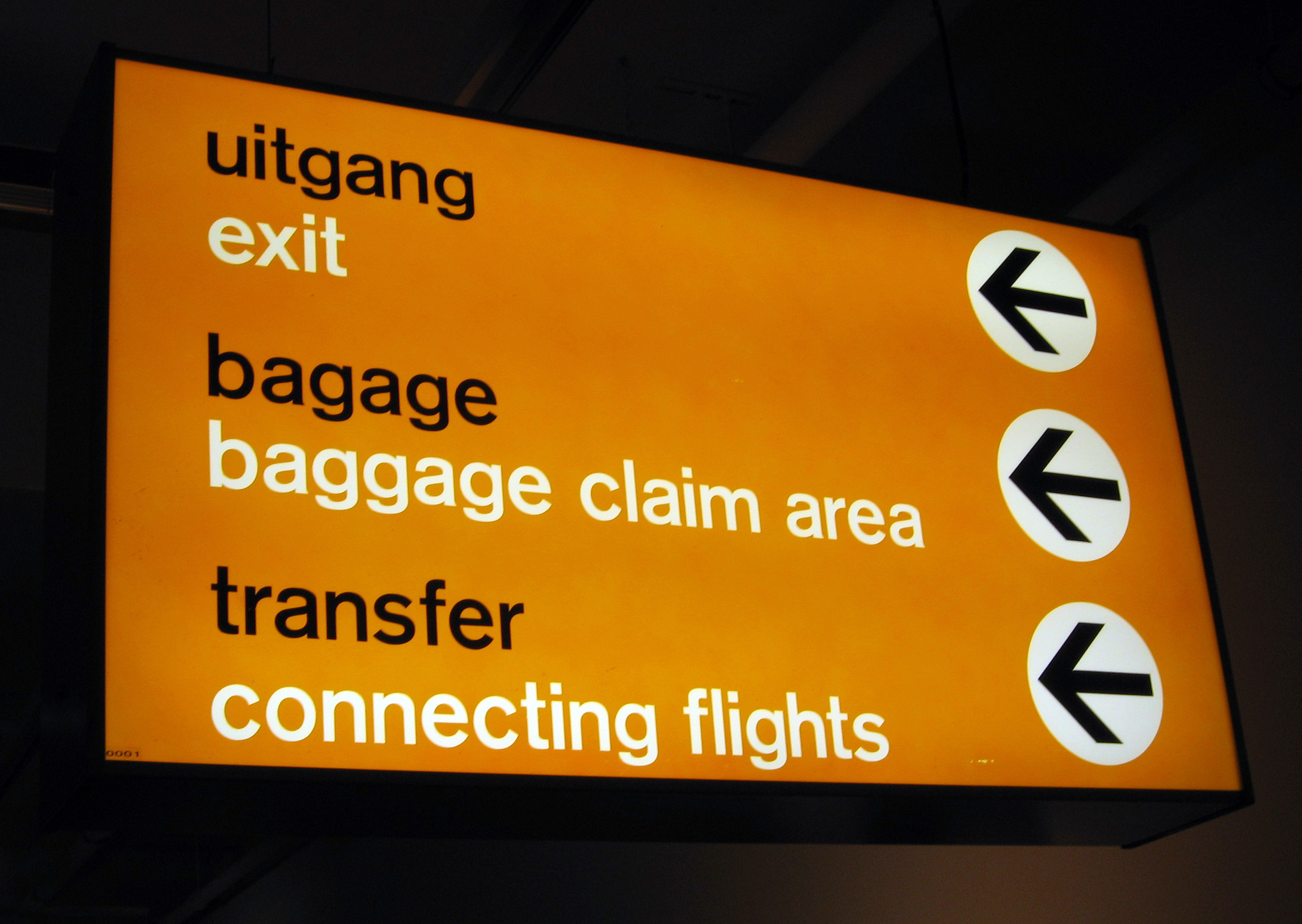
Wayfinding system for Schiphol airport, done by Wissing in Total Design.

Bernard "Benno" Wissing (26 May 1923 – 7 January 2008) was a Dutch graphic designer, painter, graphic artist, architect and product designer. He was a co-founder of the design firm Total Design and is particularly known for his wayfinding and signage system for Amsterdam Airport Schiphol.

== Life and career ==
Wissing was born in Renkum, Netherlands, on 26 May 1923. He studied fine arts at the Rotterdam Academy from 1941. In 1949, he began his career as an independent designer, working for cultural and industrial clients as well as department stores.

One of his early and important clients was the Museum Boijmans Van Beuningen in Rotterdam, for which he designed posters, catalogues and exhibitions between 1949 and 1963. He also worked for cultural institutions including De Doelen, Ahoy Rotterdam and the Rotterdam Philharmonic Orchestra.

In 1963, Wissing became one of the founders of Total Design, together with Wim Crouwel, Friso Kramer, Ben Bos and Paul and Dick Schwarz. During his time at Total Design, he worked on corporate identities, exhibitions, environmental design and wayfinding systems.

Wissing became internationally known for the wayfinding and signage system he designed for Amsterdam Airport Schiphol from 1964 to 1967. The system combined typography, colour coding and visual signs to guide passengers through the airport and became an influential example of airport signage design during the development of large international airports.

Other notable projects included signage and identities for the Martini Hall in Groningen, Ahoy Rotterdam and De Doelen, as well as a bus station in Tel Aviv. His corporate identity work included Makro, PAM and SHV.

In 1972, Wissing established his own design office. In 1978, he was offered a professorship at the Rhode Island School of Design in Providence, Rhode Island. He moved to the United States in 1980 and continued his design practice there. His American work included wayfinding, signage and identity projects for institutions including Rhode Island Hospital, the National Building Museum and Brown University. He also worked as an industrial designer on digital compasses for KVH Industries.

After suffering a stroke in 1990, Wissing's professional activity was severely limited. He subsequently returned to drawing and watercolour painting.

Wissing was made an honorary member of the Dutch Design Association for designers in 1992. In 1993, his work was exhibited at the Stedelijk Museum Amsterdam together with that of Jan Bons. In 1996, he received the Oeuvre Award from the Netherlands Foundation for Fine Arts, Design and Architecture.

Wissing died in Bristol, Rhode Island, on 7 January 2008.

== Personal life ==
Wissing was married twice. His first wife was Margaretha Laenen, whom he married in 1948. They had four children. His second wife was Jannie Wissing, with whom he moved to the United States.
