= Yarom Vardimon =

Israeli designer, professor, and laureate of the Israel Prize

- ירום ורדימון
- Born: Tel Aviv, Israel
- Occupations: Designer; Professor; Dean of the Azrieli Faculty of Design at Shenkar
- Known for: Graphic design, design education, public and cultural design projects
- Awards: Israel Prize in design (2007); Crystal Ball – Icograda; Premio a la Excelencia en Diseno; Fellow of the International Design Conference at Aspen (IDCA); Honorary member of the Art Directors Club of New York

Yarom Vardimon (Hebrew: ירום ורדימון) is an Israeli designer, professor, dean of the Azrieli Faculty of Design at Shenkar and a laureate of the Israel Prize in design.

== Biography ==
Yarom Vardimon was born in Tel Aviv, Israel; the youngest of three brothers: Reudor, the eldest child, followed by Orgad. His father, engineer Yerucham Dov Wardimon, was a pioneer in the Israeli film industry; His mother, Hannah Wardimon (née Negbi) was an author. Vardimon studied at the Herzliya Hebrew Gymnasium and later left for England to pursue architecture studies. He eventually decided on art studies at the Chelsea College of Arts, design studies at Westminster University and at the LCP (Now LCC University of the Arts).

Upon his return to Israel, Vardimon earned many prizes in design competitions and started working with public groups, cultural, social and nonprofit organizations. He was also in charge of the design of the Stock-Mandeville Paralympic games that were held in Israel at the time, the Chess Olympiad and the Open University. At the same time he also worked as a designer for governmental agencies, Keter Publishing House, the steel industry and later on became the design consultant for Elite (known today as Strauss Group Ltd.), The Mizrahi bank, Bezalel Academy of Arts and Design, the Association for Civil Rights in Israel, the Israeli Sinfonietta and the Brigham Young University Jerusalem Center. Vardimon served as an advisor to some well known establishments, such as the new Osem industrial compound, and Soroka Medical Center.

In recent years, Vardimon is working on branding different compounds, business and buildings while joining forces with leading architects. Some of the notable projects are: Hadassah Medical Center (Ein Kerem and Mount Scopus), the bilingual school, Yad Vashem, the Cinematque, the zoo and Teddy park in Jerusalem, the First International Bank Tower, Elrov tower, and The Mizrahi bank tower in Tel Aviv. Vardimon designed and curated the fourth biennale for jewelry at the Eretz Israel Museum in Tel Aviv. He also curated design exhibitions at the Lorber Gallery at Shenkar. These included exhibitions of the work of designer Dan Reisinger, British designer Abram Games, and the "home for all" exhibition by the "Poster for Tomorrow" organization. Vardimon lives in Tel Aviv, married to Edda – originally from Denmark – and father of four children.

== Academic career ==
When he was 26 years old, Vardimon was invited to join the faculty of Bezalel Academy of Arts and Design. Between the years 1984-1996 he was the head of the graphic design department. At the age of 32 he became an associate professor and then a professor. During these years, he promoted the field of graphic design in the ad hoc committee that was set up by the council for higher education, led by the artist professor Yitzhak Danziger of the Technion. Vardimon developed a system for sorting design program candidates and initiated innovative teaching and design curricula that included: political and social thinking teams, branding and design, and "film as a form of communication". He founded the "lecturer for an hour" program, hosting academic, cultural and political personas and formed The Studio - Academic workshops for industry and social groups.

In 2001, Vardimon was invited to teach at the school of architecture at Tel Aviv University. After two years, he joined Shenkar, first as vice president of academic affairs, and later as dean of the design faculty. It was at the time, that discussions about the academic status for the departments of visual communications, industrial design, interior, structural and environmental design and multidisciplinary design, were conducted. Vardimon initiated the master's program in interdisciplinary design (with or without thesis). He served as chair of the nomination committee at Bezalel and later at Shenkar, as a member of professional committees and as an external advisor in nomination procedures in Israel and abroad. He was a guest lecturer at several institutions overseas such as Rhode Island School of Design in the U.S., Danish Design School in Copenhagen and the Royal College (external evaluator), Ravensbourne College and Saint Martins in London.

== Public activity ==
Vardimon served as president of the graphic designers association in Israel. During his tenure he formed the designer's ethical code, together with Mike Felheim, and built an infrastructure for the working procedures between designers and the Philatelic service. He was appointed vice president of Icograda, the international council of graphic designers associations, a member of its education committee and was asked to plan its public branding. He was a member of the planning committee for the international conference at the University of Alberta in Canada and chair of the planning committee for the Icograda new media conference. He was also chair of an international working group in the Netherlands dealing with design in third world countries. He was appointed chair of the public committee for the design museum in Holon and presented the structure and a vision for the city council. He was a member of a committee for establishing The Speaker of the Knesset Quality of Life Prize, served as chair of the committee for the design arts education by the board of education and as an arbitrator by the council of higher education. Vardimon was a member of the management committee of the Max Stern Academic College of Emek Yezreel, an advisor for academic acknowledgment issues and chair of the committee for the design arts by the board of education.

Vardimon served as a judge in many design competitions in Israel and abroad, including the International Art Directors Club, the Bank of Israel and other governmental offices. Between the years 2001–2003, he directed the new media at the prestigious Alliance Graphique Internationale, working towards its first website.

== Honours and awards ==
In 2007, Vardimon was awarded the Israel Prize in design. The prize committee wrote that he is "amongst the most notable designers and educators in the field of graphic design in Israel. With his talent and leadership he changed the value and standards of design in Israel, for his numerous achievements and extensive contribution to the field of design in Israel, for his creations that excel in high quality visual thinking and expression, for his uncompromising and original solutions that are based on intellectual emotional quality, along with integrity and personal and professional responsibility, and for his influential activity as an educator". Vardimon won the Crystal Ball – a badge of excellence awarded by the international council of graphic design associations - Icograda. He is a fellow of the International Design Conference at Aspen (IDCA), an honorary member of the Art Directors Club of New York and a winner of the Premio a la Excelencia en Diseno, the South America design conference. His work was featured in international literature, in design exhibitions and in leading collections around the world including: The museum of modern art (MoMA) in New York, the Victoria and Albert museum in London, the poster museum in Poland, the Aarhus poster museum in Denmark, Musee d'Art Decoratif in Paris and the Israel museum in Jerusalem. In addition, he was invited to compose the entry for "design in Israel" in international publications such as Who is Who, One by One and the introduction to Graphis millennium. He was invited to be featured in books such as A Smile in the Mind (by Phaidon Press), Graphics in the Third Dimension (by Graphic-Sha Publishing) and was chosen as one of "100 Designers of the World" by the Japanese magazine Idea.
