= Eliyahu Nawi =

- אליהו נאוי
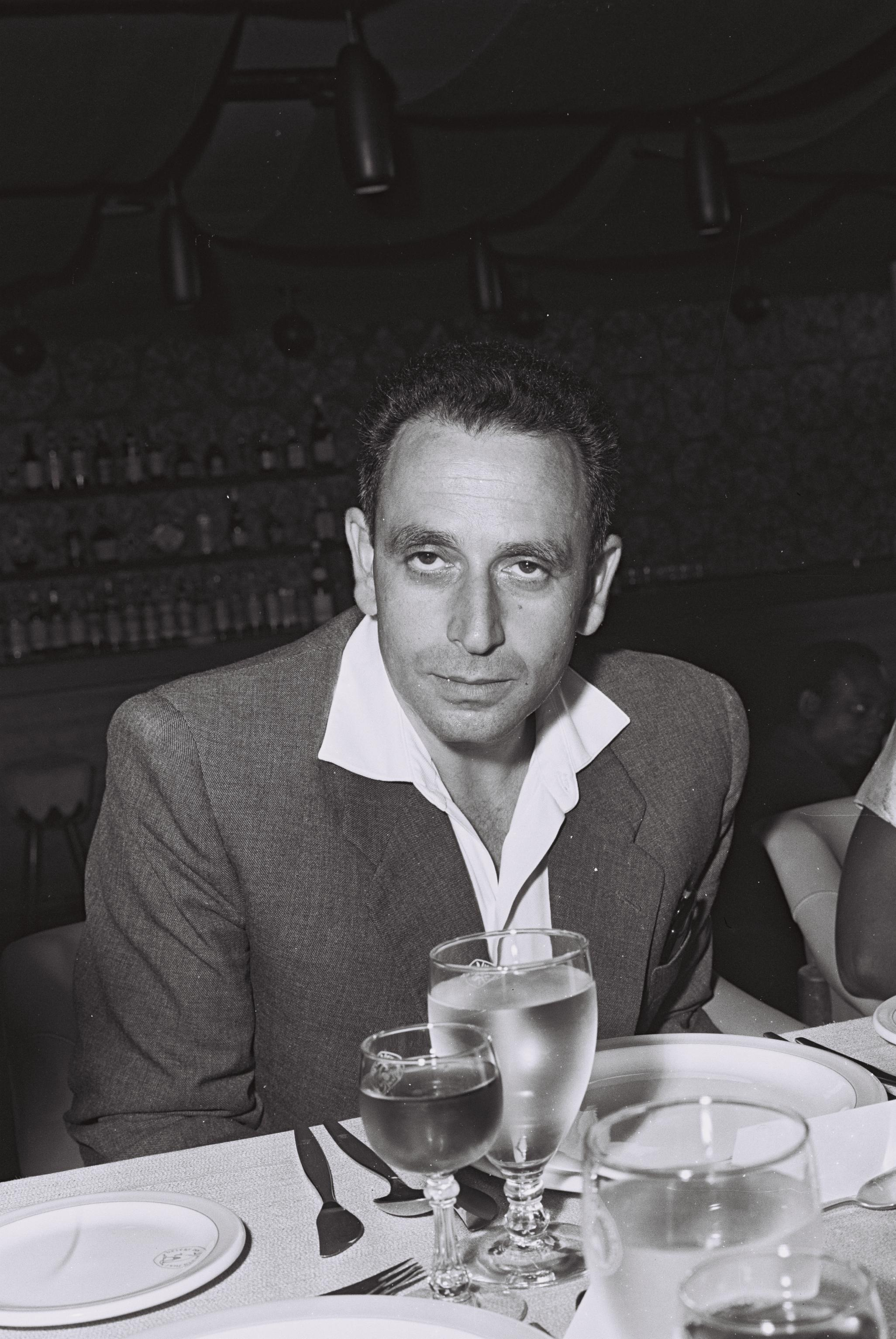

3rd Mayor of Beersheba
- In office 1963–1986
- Preceded by: Ze'ev Zrizi
- Succeeded by: Moshe Zilberman

Personal details
- Born: 22 June 1920 Basra, Iraq
- Died: 16 November 2012 (aged 92) Ganey Omer, Israel
- Party: Mapai

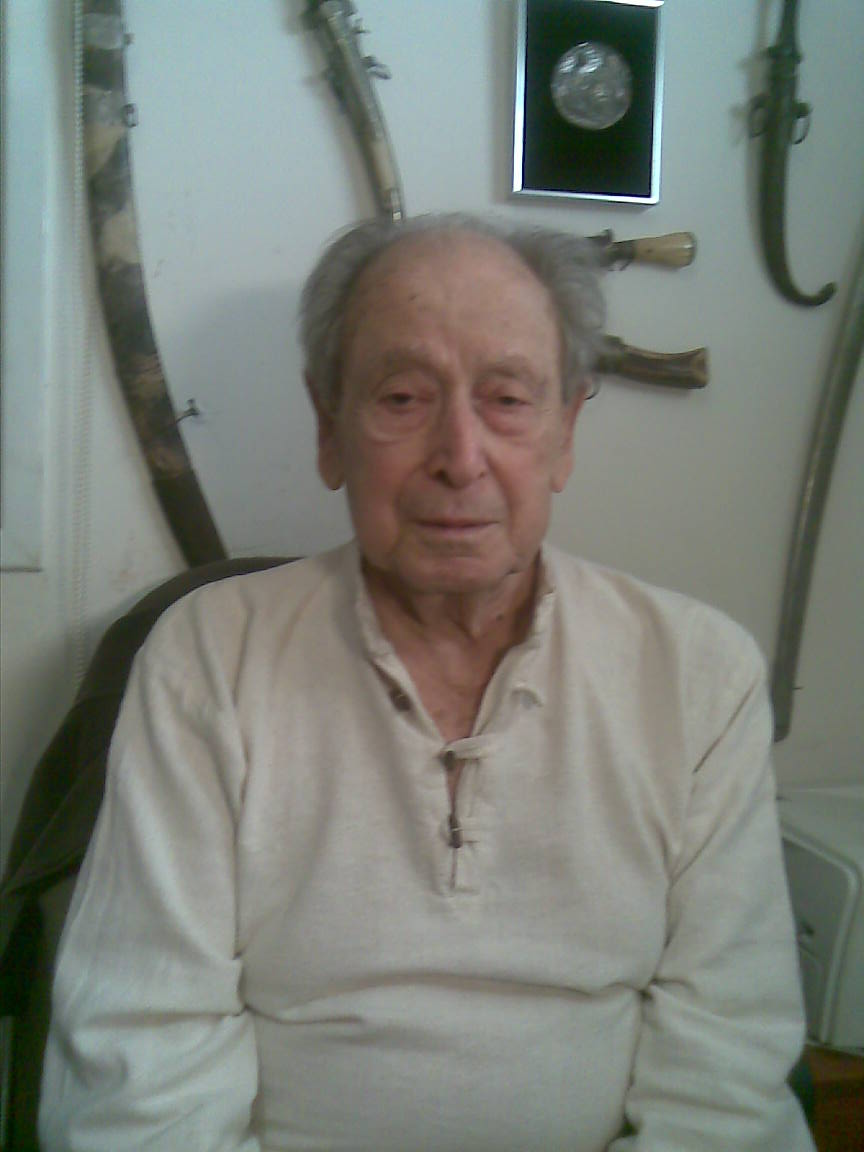
Eliyahu Nawi, October 2010

Eliyahu Nawi (Hebrew: אליהו נאוי; June 22, 1920 – November 16, 2012) was a judge, lawyer, poet, politician, Bible investigator, and mayor of Beersheba.

== Biography ==
Eliyahu Nawi was born in Basra, Iraq. He immigrated to Jerusalem with his family at the age of six. He served in the Israel Defense Forces and attained the rank of major in the intelligence services. In 1947, Nawi moved to Beersheba as a liaison man between the British Mandate authorities and the Arab population. He later became a judge in the Beersheba magistrates' court. In 1983, the Public Council for Falasha Jews elected Nawi as its honorary president. He was married to Beruria who immigrated to Israel from Germany in the 1930s.

== Political career ==
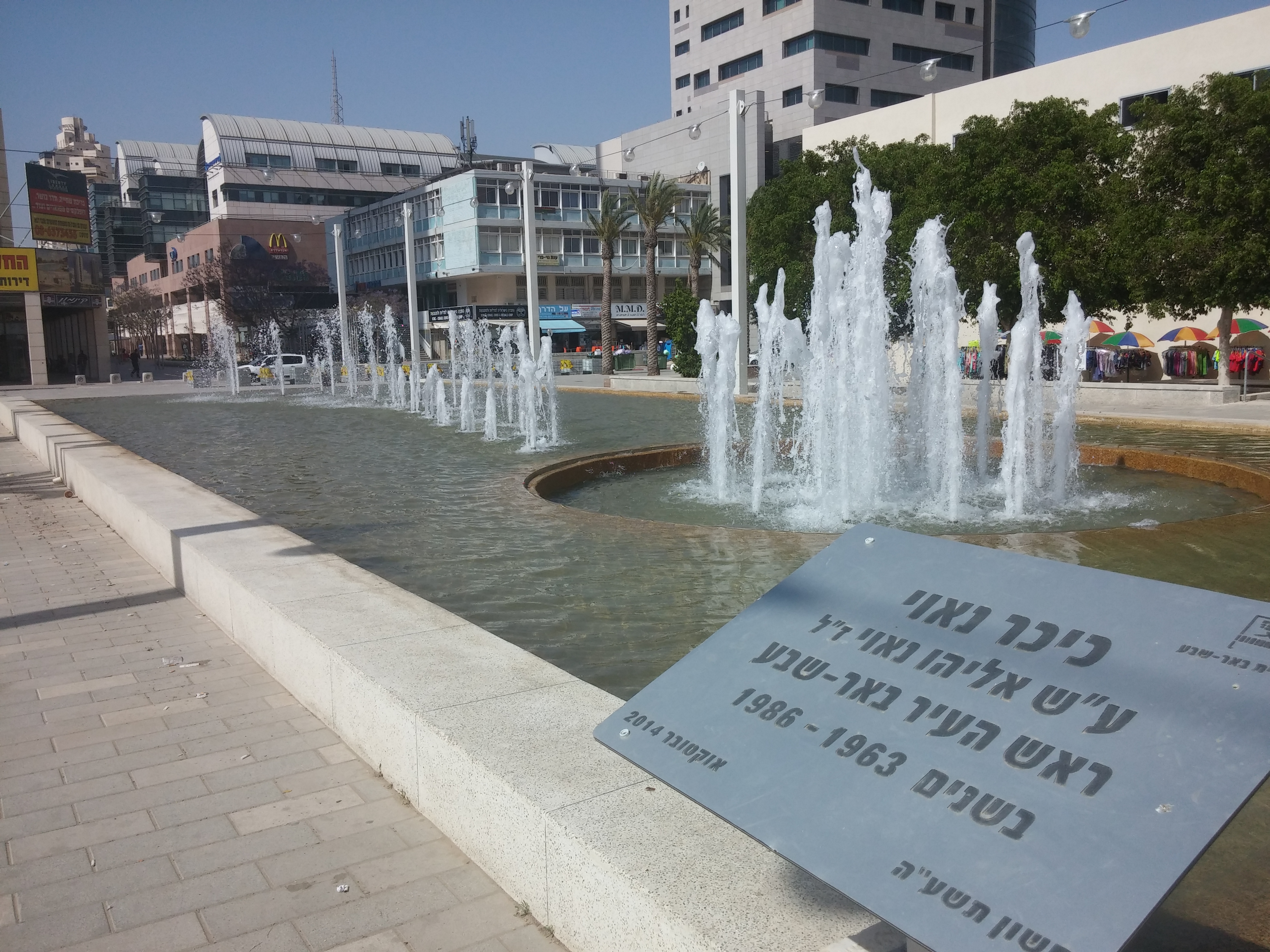
Nawi Square in Beersheba

Prior to the 1963 municipal elections in Beersheba, the leadership of Mapai chose Nawi to head the party's electoral list in Beersheba. Nawi was chosen both for his formal education and his Iraqi descent, important in light of ethnic tensions in the city at the time. During his election campaign, Nawi rejected the notion that he was chosen for his ethnic background, but twelve years later wrote that this had been in fact the reason. In the election, held on August 28, 1963, Nawi won against David Hakham, then deputy mayor and himself a former Mapai member, and Ze'ev Zrizi of Mapam. Nawi continued his tenure until 1986. During most of his tenure, Ze'ev Zrizi served as his deputy.
