= Stuart Pugh =

British product designer

- Born: 1929; Halifax, UK
- Died: 9 October 1993 (aged 64)
- Known for: Total Design and Pugh Concept Selection
- Scientific career
- Fields: Product design and development, engineering and management
- Institutions: University of Strathclyde, Glasgow, Scotland – Design Division; Loughborough University

Stuart Pugh (1929 - 9 October 1993) was a British product designer from Halifax, UK. He is known for redefining Total Design (methodology), which had previously been coined by Ove Arup regarding integrated architecture and structural engineering, to instead map a structured and integrated process in the field of product design and development that included market and production processes.

== Biography ==
Stuart Pugh was a design engineer and manager. His experience in industry led him to pursue a secondary career in academia, where he published on 'Total Design'.

Stuart Pugh graduated from London University with a degree in Mechanical Engineering and became a graduate apprentice for the British Aircraft Corporation. In 1956 he worked in the Warton Aerodrome as a project engineer for the Mach 6 Wind Tunnel. In 1963 he became the Chief Designer of the Mechanical Product Division at the Marconi Company. In the later stages of his industrial career, Pugh worked within the English Electric Company as Chief Designer in the Hydraulic Equipment Division, ultimately progressing to become Divisional Manager.

Pugh left industry in 1970 and began his academic career as a 'Smallpeice' Reader in Design for Production at Loughborough University of Technology. Later, he became the Director of the 'Engineering Design Centre'.

Pugh moved to Scotland and in 1985 became the 'Babcock Professor of Engineering Design' and the head of the 'Design Division' at the University of Strathclyde in Glasgow. The Design Division merged in 1989 with the Department of Production Management and Manufacturing Technology to create the Department of Design, Manufacture and Engineering Management (DMEM), of which Pugh remained head until his death in 1993. It was here that Pugh produced his seminal book, 'Total Design: Integrated Methods for Successful Product Engineering’, published in 1990. Pugh Introduced and taught Total Design across the faculty of engineering at Strathclyde University. He ran multidisciplinary design classes which included students of architecture and law. He also contributed to the MBA program and taught short courses on Total Design to Industrial managers.

Soon after Pugh published his book 'Total Design', Professor Don Clausing (MIT) and Professor Ken Ragsdell (University of Missouri) encouraged Pugh to publish his collection of papers to make his work readily available to design engineers and managers. However, Pugh's untimely death from illness ultimately led Don Clausing and Ronaldo Andrade (Universidade Federal de Rio de Janeiro, Brazil) to complete Pugh's book 'Creating Innovative Products Using Total Design: The Living Legacy of Stuart Pugh’.

== Total Design ==
=== Definition of Total Design ===
“Total Design is the systematic activity necessary, from the identification of the market/user need, to the selling of the successful product to satisfy that need – an activity that encompasses product, process, people and organisation.” – Stuart Pugh

The design process previous to the total design methodology was very much ad hoc which Pugh described as ‘partial design’. Engineers and designers focused on their part within the total design of a product, rarely becoming part of the full product development process. This often led to commercial failure, due to the lack of consideration of the market, the user needs and the resources of the organisation (non-technological factors). Total design offers a visible operational structure which allows for the integration of technological and non-technological parts enabling efficient and effective product development.

=== Design Activity Model ===
“Total design may be construed as having a central core of activities, all of which are imperative for any design, irrespective of domain. Briefly, this core, the design core, consists of market (user need), product design specification, conceptual design, detail design, manufacture and sales. All design starts, or should start, with a need that, when satisfied, will fit into an existing market or create a market of its own.” – Stuart Pugh

The design core separates the design process into six iterative stages. This structure enables the seamless flow of information between stages while enabling the formation of multi-disciplined project teams.

=== Product Design Specification (PDS) ===
"From the statement of the need – often called the brief – a product design specification (PDS) must be formulated – the specification of the product to be designed. Once this is established, it acts as the mantle or cloak that envelopes all the subsequent stages in the design core. The PDS thus acts as the control for the total design activity, because it places the boundaries on the subsequent designs." – Stuart Pugh

A PDS is a dynamic document that evolves during the design process. At the end of the design activity the design must be in balance with the final version of the PDS. Pugh devised a structure for a PDS that has 34 elements, however some elements may not be applicable to certain projects.

== Concept Selection – Method of Controlled Convergence ==
Pugh's most famous work, "Concept Selection – A Method that Works", describes Pugh's innovative 'controlled convergence' technique that was put to the test so successfully for General Motors' Saturn project.

"A major advantage of controlled convergence over other matrix selection methods is that it allows alternative convergent (analytic) and divergent (synthetic) thinking to occur, since as the reasoning proceeds and a reduction in the number of concepts comes about for rational reasons, new concepts are generated." – Stuart Pugh

The "Pugh method" of concept selection is a form of decision matrix, associated with the QFD method. It is implemented by establishing an evaluation team and constructing the matrix which contains evaluation criteria versus alternative concepts. A baseline concept is selected and the other concepts are scored against the criteria relative to the baseline. The scoring is done in symbol form, of either a positive, negative or neutral scoring. The scores are then combined to give a numerical output for each concept, the highest score being the most compatible.

== Publications ==
=== Books ===
- Stuart Pugh, Don Clausing, Ron Andrade, (24 April 1996). Creating Innovative Products Using Total Design. Addison Wesley Longman. ISBN 0-201-63485-6
- Pugh, S. (February 1991). Total Design: Integrated Methods for Successful Product Engineering. Addison-Wesley. ISBN 0-201-41639-5
- S.Pugh, B.Hollins, (March 1990). Successful Product Design: What to Do and When. Butterworth-Heinemann. ISBN 0-408-03861-6

== See also ==
- Pugh method
