= Soroka Medical Center =

Hospital in Beersheva, Israel

- Clalit Health Services
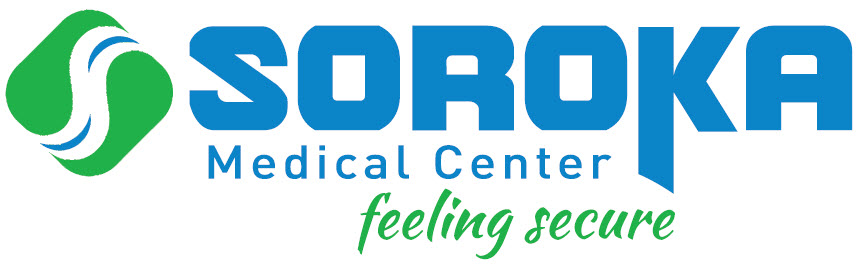

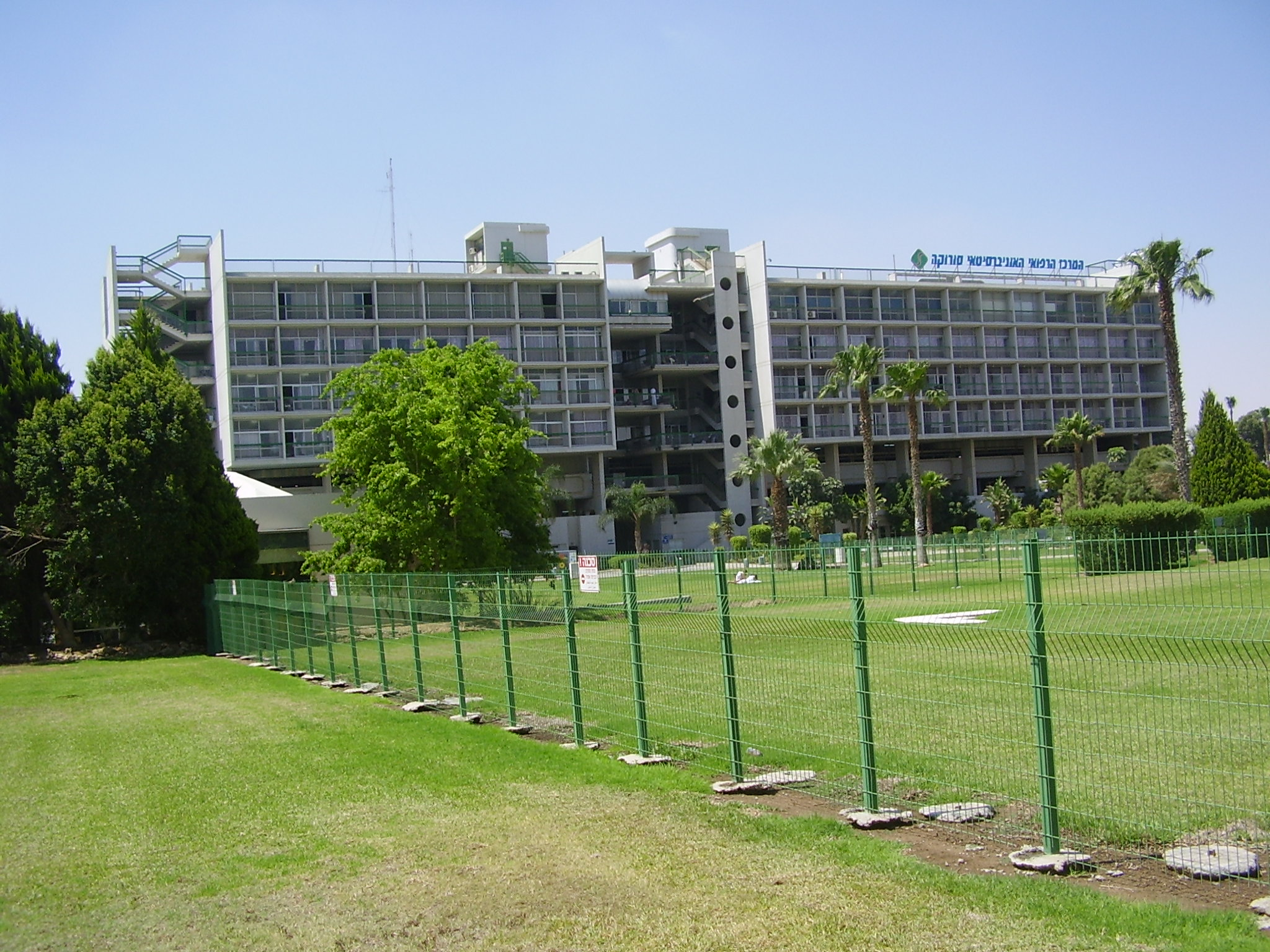
- Soroka Medical Center, Beersheba

Geography
- Location: Beersheba, Negev, Israel
- Coordinates: 31°15′32″N 34°48′05″E

Organisation
- Care system: Public hospital
- Type: Teaching hospital
- Affiliated university: Ben Gurion University

Services
- Standards: Tertiary care
- Emergency department: Level I Trauma Center
- Beds: 1,221

History
- Founded: 1959

Links
- Website: www.soroka.org

Soroka University Medical Center (Hebrew: המרכז הרפואי סורוקה, HaMerkaz HaRefu'i Soroka), a part of the Clalit Health Services Group, is the general hospital of Beersheba, Israel, it serves as the central hospital of the region and provides medical services to approximately one million residents of the South, from Kiryat Gat and Ashkelon to Eilat. Soroka has 1,221 hospital beds, and is spread over 286 dunams (0.286 km^{2}; 0.110 sq mi) in the center of Beer-Sheva.

Soroka provides medical care to all communities in the region, including Negev Bedouins. It is a teaching hospital affiliated with the faculty of Health Sciences at Ben-Gurion University of the Negev, whose campus is adjacent to the hospital. During times of conflict in the South (such as the October 7th 2023 attack on Israel), Soroka has served as an emergency center for casualties.

== History ==
=== Foundation and early history ===
Following the independence of Israel, the Medical Corps established a temporary military hospital in one of the former Ottoman government buildings in Beersheva. A year later, the hospital was transferred to a British government compound, where it was run by the Hadassah Medical Association and named after Dr. Chaim Yassky.

In 1949, Clalit Health Fund of the Hebrew Workers in Eretz Israel opened a clinic in the city to serve citizens who were members of the Histadrut. This clinic required hospital services for continued treatment. The nearest hospital was the Kaplan Medical Center in Rehovot.

Hadassah was not in a position to expand its operations due to budgetary constraints as Hadassah Hospital in Jerusalem was then under construction.

David Ben-Gurion proposed that the government should establish a hospital in the Negev rather than Hadassah or the Histadrut, but the Health Ministry did not have sufficient funding.

David Tuviyahu, mayor of Beersheva, joined the effort to establish a larger, more spacious and modern hospital. For this purpose, he met with various individuals, among them Moshe Soroka, chairman of the Clalit Health Services. Soroka expressed his willingness in principle for the Histadrut Health Fund to establish a hospital, but Minister of Health Yosef Serlin, who aspired to reduce the activity of the fund and transfer it to the state, objected to this idea.

In August 1955, Dov Begun, representative of the Histadrut in the United States, convinced the president of the International Ladies' Garment Workers' Union, David Dubinsky (1892–1982), to donate US$1 million ($250,000 every year for four years) toward establishing a hospital in the Negev that would commemorate the organization's name.

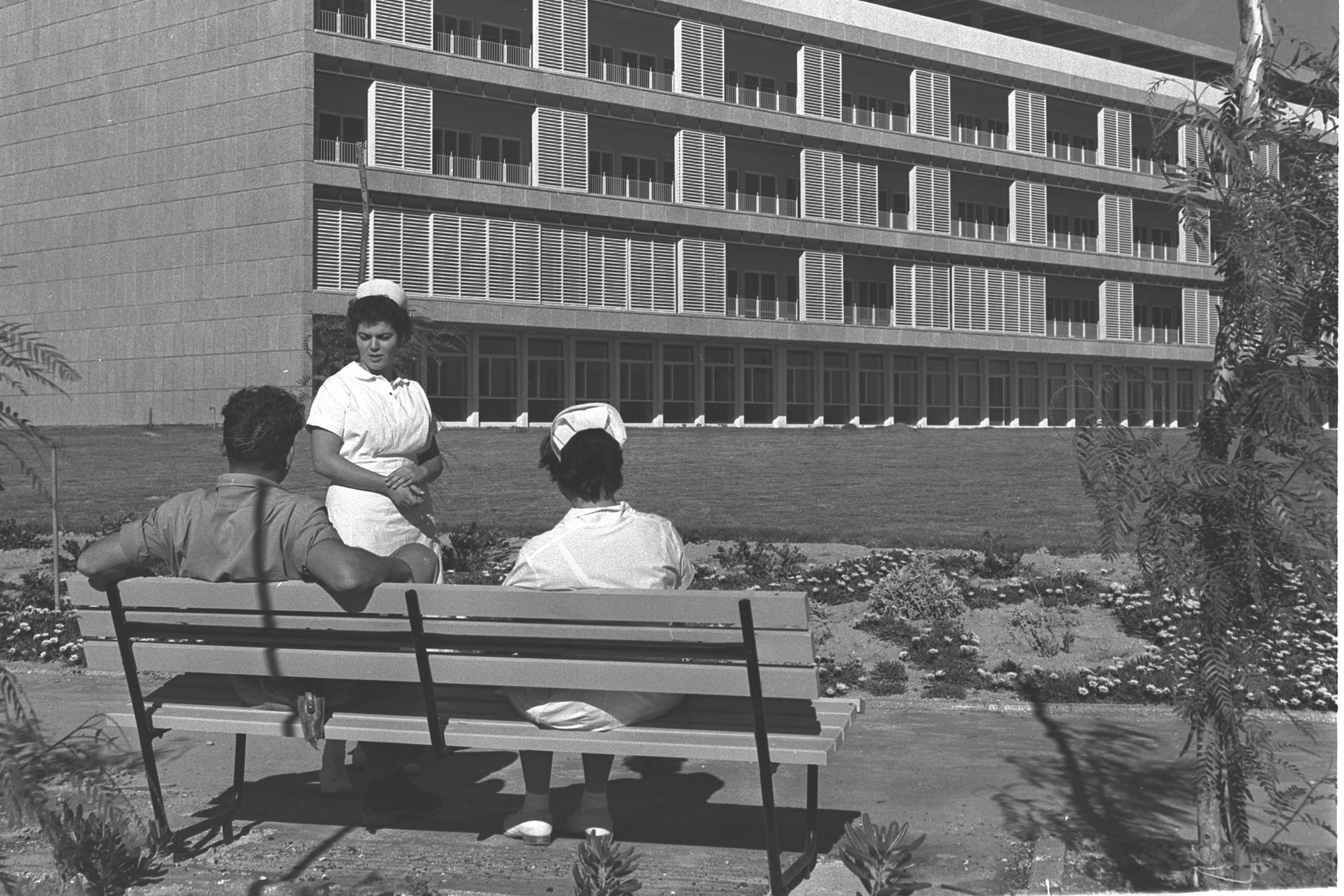
Soroka Hospital, 1959

The groundbreaking ceremony took place on 23 July 1956. The hospital building was designed by architects Arieh Sharon and Benjamin Idelson.

In October 1959, the opening ceremony of the Central Hospital of the Negev was held. At first, the hospital contained several departments: the General Surgery Department (in the framework of which were the Otolaryngology Department, the Ophthalmology Department, and the Urology Department), two internal medicine departments, the Orthopedic Department, the Cardiology Institute, and the Radiology Institute. Later, additional departments were opened.

=== 1970s: New name ===
After Moshe Soroka, the director of Clalit Health Organization in the 1950s, had died in 1972, the hospital was renamed in his memory.

=== 21st century ===
In 2018, Shlomi Codish was named director-general of the hospital, replacing Ehud Davidson, who held the post for five years.

On 19 June 2025, during the Twelve-Day War, the hospital was struck by an Iranian missile, causing extensive damage and injuring about 65 people. The attack was called "an act of terrorism" by Israel's Health Minister Uriel Buso. Later on in the day, The International Committee of the Red Cross commented on the attack stating: "Victims and patients, medical staff, and hospitals must be respected and protected", and that the international law must be followed.

== The campus ==
The hospital covers an area of 286 dunams, with a constructed area of more than 200,000 square meters (2.15 million square feet) and includes 30 buildings.

- The Internal Medicine Building, located at the center of the campus, houses most of the departments from the field of internal medicine: the internal medicine departments, the Neurology Department, the Nephrology Department and the Dialysis Unit.
- The Camelia Botnar Surgical Building was inaugurated in 2003. It contains about half the hospital's operating rooms, eight patient wards, the Emergency Room, the Intensive Care Unit, and other units.
- The Cheryl and Haim Saban Children's Hospital, inaugurated in 2008, includes the Pediatric Emergency Room, the Pediatric Intensive Care Unit, the three pediatric inpatient wards, the Pediatric Surgery Department, the Haemato-Oncology Department, and the Department of Eating Disorders.
- The Saban Birth and Maternity Center was inaugurated in 2011 and includes 25 individual delivery rooms, the gynecology and obstetrics emergency rooms, operating rooms, and five maternity wards.
- The Legacy Heritage Oncology Center and Dr. Larry Norton Institute, inaugurated in 2018, provides services in the field of cancer treatment and research under one roof.
- Additional buildings are under construction in the hospital compound, among them the rehabilitation medicine building, a new Neonatal care building and a dedicated medical research center.

== Activity ==
Soroka Medical Center has over 40 departments and 1,191 hospital beds. In addition to the hospital departments, there are dozens of other units that provide services to hospitalized and ambulatory patients, in the Emergency Medicine Department, institutes, and outpatient clinics.

Soroka's Department of Emergency Medicine, with the largest volume of activity in Israel (more than 270,000 visits annually), is the leading such department in the country according to a health care survey on service and quality conducted by the Ministry of Health.

In Soroka's delivery rooms more than 17,000 babies are born every year, a high number in international terms.

In 2023, 32,400 surgeries were performed at the hospital and 100,000 hospitalizations took place. There were over 600,000 visits to the outpatient clinics.

Soroka has some 5,700 employees, including more than 900 doctors, 2,000 nurses, 800 health workers and 500 administrative employees.

Soroka Medical Center provides medical services to more than one million residents of the Negev, who reside in 60% of the geographical area of the country. Unique populations cared for at Soroka include Bedouins, who make up a third of the population, and large groups of immigrants from Ethiopia and the former Soviet Union.

== Standards ==
- The Joint Commission International (JCI) Quality and Safety Certificate – Soroka Medical Center was one of three Clalit hospitals which were the first in Israel to receive the certificate of accreditation of the JCI in 2008.
- Standards for Environmental Management Systems (ISO 14001) – Soroka is a green hospital. In 2014, the medical center was awarded the Environmental Quality Award.
- Health Information Security Standard (ISO 27799).
- Systems and structures maintenance Standard (ISO 9001).
- Quality Management Standard (ISO 9000) was granted to the Neonatal Intensive Care unit and the logistics department.

== University Medical Center ==
Soroka Medical Center is a university medical center that maintains close ties with Ben-Gurion University of the Negev (BGU). The hospital staff partners in training the students. Approximately 1,000 students study at the hospital annually. The campus of BGU's Faculty of Health Sciences is located in the hospital compound.

Many clinical trials approved by the Helsinki Committee are conducted at Soroka. As of 2023, the committee is chaired by Prof. Eitan Lunenfeld.

A center for clinical research operates at Soroka, leading and promoting research with hospital staff and colleagues outside of the hospital in Israel and abroad, sometimes in cooperation with BGU.

Every year, approximately 300 new studies are approved at the hospital, and some 600 articles on research of clinical and managerial significance have been published in the scientific literature.

== Directors ==
| Years | | Director General | Source |
|---|---|---|---|
| 1960 | 1978 | Prof. Yosef Stern | |
| 1978 | 1983 | Dr. David Ronen | |
| 1983 | 1987 | Prof. Yair Shapira | |
| 1987 | 1989 | Dr. Yitzhak Romem | |
| 1989 | 1995 | Prof. Haim Reuveni | |
| 1995 | 1997 | Dr. Yitzhak Peterburg | |
| 1997 | 2001 | Prof. Shlomo Mor-Yosef | |
| 2001 | 2007 | Dr. Eitan Hai-Am | |
| 2007 | 2013 | Prof. Michael Sherf | |
| 2013 | 2018 | Prof. Ehud Davidson | |
| 2018 | present | Prof. Shlomi Codish | |

== See also ==
- Health care in Israel
- List of hospitals in Israel
