= Decision-matrix method =

Pugh concept selection

The decision-matrix method, also Pugh method or Pugh concept selection, invented by Stuart Pugh, is a qualitative technique used to rank the multi-dimensional options of an option set. It is frequently used in engineering for making design decisions but can also be used to rank investment options, vendor options, product options or any other set of multidimensional entities.

== Definition ==
A basic decision matrix consists of establishing a set of criteria and a group of potential candidate designs. One of these is a reference candidate design. The other designs are then compared to this reference design and being ranked as better, worse, or same based on each criterion. The number of times "better" and "worse" appeared for each design is then displayed, but not summed up.

A weighted decision matrix operates in the same way as the basic decision matrix but introduces the concept of weighting the criteria in order of importance. The more important the criterion the higher the weighting it should be given.

== Advantages ==
The advantage of the decision-making matrix is that it encourages self-reflection amongst the members of a design team to analyze each candidate with a minimized bias (for team members can be biased towards certain designs, such as their own). Another advantage of this method is that sensitivity studies can be performed. An example of this might be to see how much your opinion would have to change in order for a lower ranked alternative to outrank a competing alternative.

== Disadvantages ==
However, there are some important disadvantages of the decision-matrix method:

- The list of criteria options is arbitrary. There is no way to know a priori if the list is complete; it is likely that important criteria are missing.
- Conversely, it is possible that less important criteria are included, causing decision makers to be distracted and biased in their choice of options.
- Scoring methods, even with weighting, tend to equalize all the requirements. But a few requirements are "must haves". If enough minor criteria are listed, it is possible for them to add up and select an option that misses a "must have" requirement.
- The values assigned to each option are guesses, not based on any quantitative measurements. In fact the entire decision matrix can create the impression of being scientific, even though it requires no quantitative measurements of anything at all.

== Morphological analysis ==
Morphological analysis is another form of a decision matrix employing a multi-dimensional configuration space linked by way of logical relationships.

== See also ==
- MCDA
- Belief decision matrix
