= A Smile in the Mind =

Graphic design book

A Smile in the Mind: Witty thinking in graphic design
- 1996 edition
- Author: Beryl McAlhone, David Stuart; Greg Quinton, Nick Asbury (2016 edition)
- Language: English
- Published: 1996
- Publisher: Phaidon Press
- Publication place: United Kingdom
- Media type: Print
- ISBN: 0714833282

A Smile in the Mind: Witty thinking in graphic design is a graphic design book written by Beryl McAlhone and David Stuart in 1996. It was first published in hardback in May 1996 through Phaidon Press and was later revised and updated in 2016. The book includes works from over 300 designers in the United States, Britain, Europe, and Japan, and a series of interviews with designers such as Ivan Chermayeff, Milton Glaser, and Alan Fletcher.

== Reception ==
A review in the RSA Journal found places where the "wit wears thin" but "these interludes are few and far between", and praised the work for its images and examples. Print also gave a review, writing that it was "not only entertaining, it's also a valuable instruction manual for one of the most useful but difficult-to-judge aspects of contemporary graphics."
