= Rabin Medical Center =

- Clalit Health Services
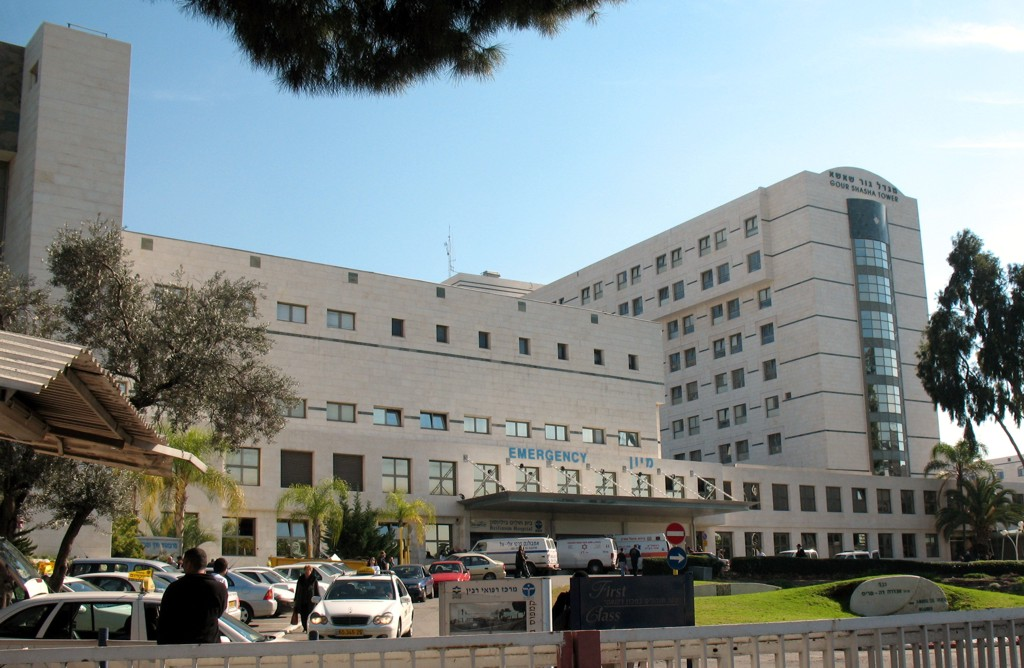
- Rabin Medical Center

Geography
- Location: Petah Tikva, Israel
- Coordinates: 32°05′24″N 34°52′03″E

Organisation
- Care system: Public
- Type: District General

Services
- Beds: 1,313

History
- Opened: January 1996

Links
- Website: hospitals.clalit.co.il/Hospitals/Rabin/en-us/Pages/Homepage.aspx
- Lists: Hospitals in Israel

Rabin Medical Center (Hebrew: מרכז רפואי רבין) is a large general hospital located in Petah Tikva, Israel. It is owned and operated by Clalit Health Services, Israel's largest health maintenance organization. In January 1996, Beilinson Hospital and Hasharon Hospital were merged and renamed Rabin Medical Center. It has a capacity of 1,300 beds.

In 2025, Newsweek ranked it as the third best hospital in Israel and the 122nd best in the world.

== History ==
=== Beilinson Hospital ===
Beilinson hospital ward in the 1950s

Beilinson Hospital was founded in 1936 to serve the nearby agricultural settlements. All Jewish workers in central Palestine agreed to donate two days' worth of wages toward its construction. The hospital opened with 70 beds. It was named for Dr. Moshe Beilinson, one of its founders.

HaSharon Hospital was built in 1942 as an extension of Beilinson. In 1954, a new building in the International Style was designed by Arieh Sharon and Benjamin Idelson, pioneers of Israeli modernist architecture.

In 1938, the country's first blood bank was established at Beilinson. Beilinson Hospital was the first medical institution in the country to have a dermatology department, a nephrology institute, and a dialysis unit. In 1968, the first heart transplant in Israel was performed there. The first implantation of an artificial heart in Israel was performed at Beilinson in 1995.

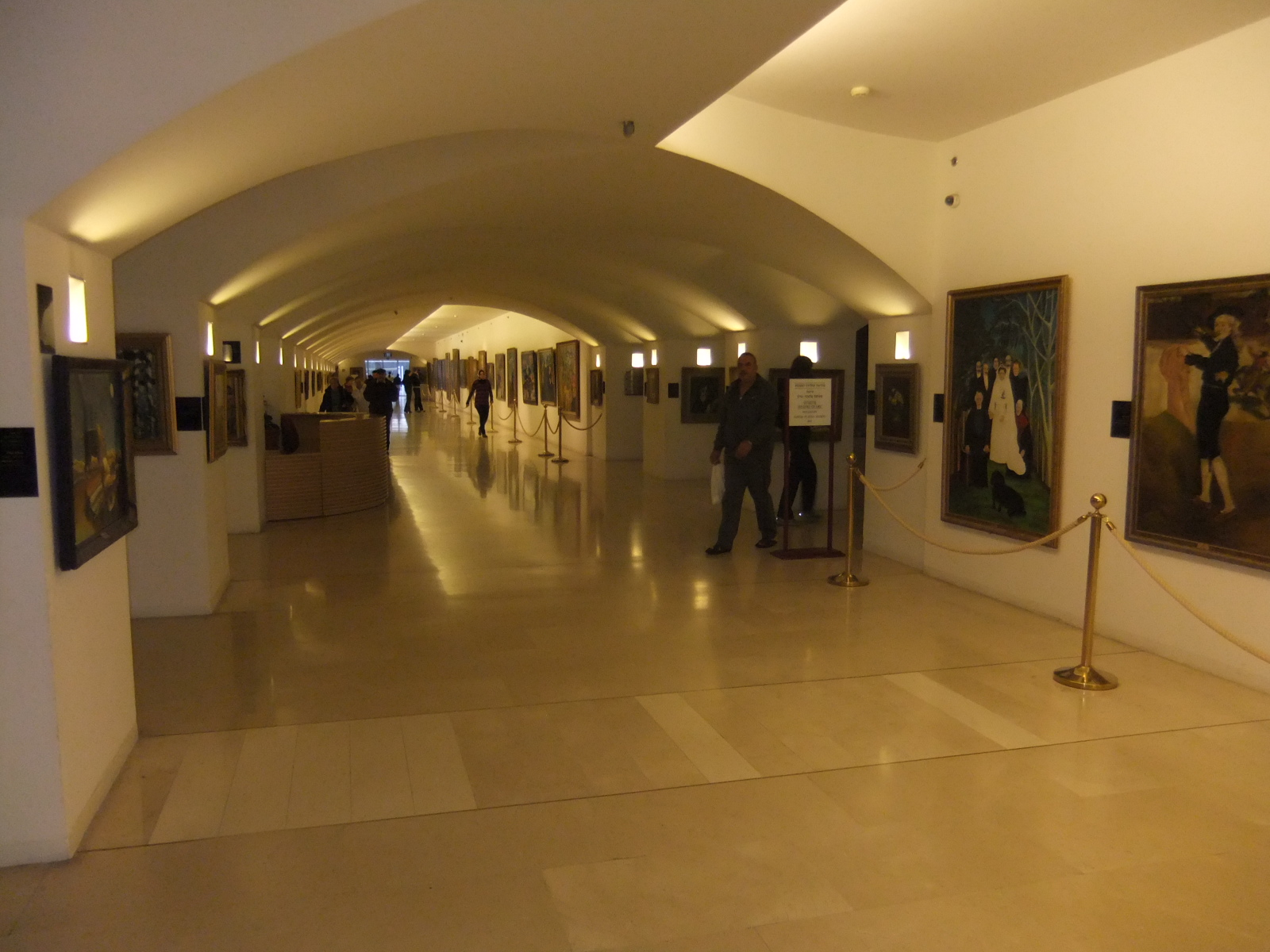
Shmuel Flatto-Sharon art gallery, Rabin Medical Center

=== Golda–HaSharon Hospital ===
HaSharon Hospital was founded in 1942 by a team of surgeons from the Beilinson Hospital as a satellite surgical unit. It was originally established in a 1-floor building, and named Beilinson II. It originally had 28 beds. Beilinson II was renamed HaSharon Hospital several years later. In 1982, Golda was appended to the hospital's name, after the late Israeli prime minister, Golda Meir. Golda-HaSharon Hospital currently has 400 beds.

=== Merger ===
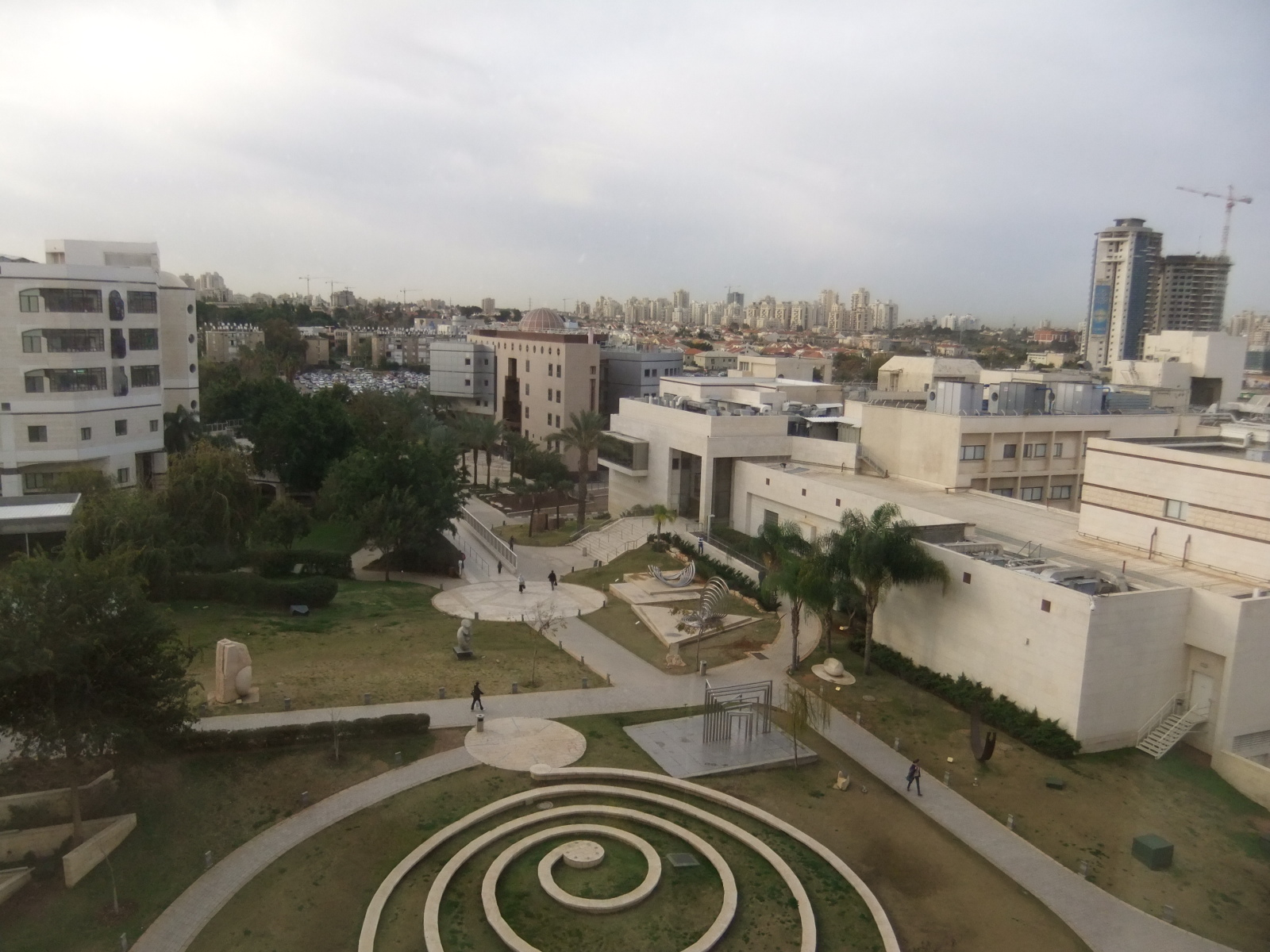
Grounds of Rabin Medical Center

While physically separated, the two hospitals were officially merged in 1996 in a budget saving consolidation and the umbrella organization renamed the Rabin Medical Center, in memory of Yitzhak Rabin, the prime minister who had been assassinated in the previous year.

== Clinical research ==
In 2012, the hospital received NIS 63.5 million in revenue for clinical research, after a 70% increase from 2011, topping the list for Israeli hospitals.

== See also ==
- Health care in Israel
- Medical tourism in Israel
- Schneider Children's Medical Center of Israel
