= Clalit Health Services =

Largest state-mandated health organization in Israel

- שירותי בריאות כללית
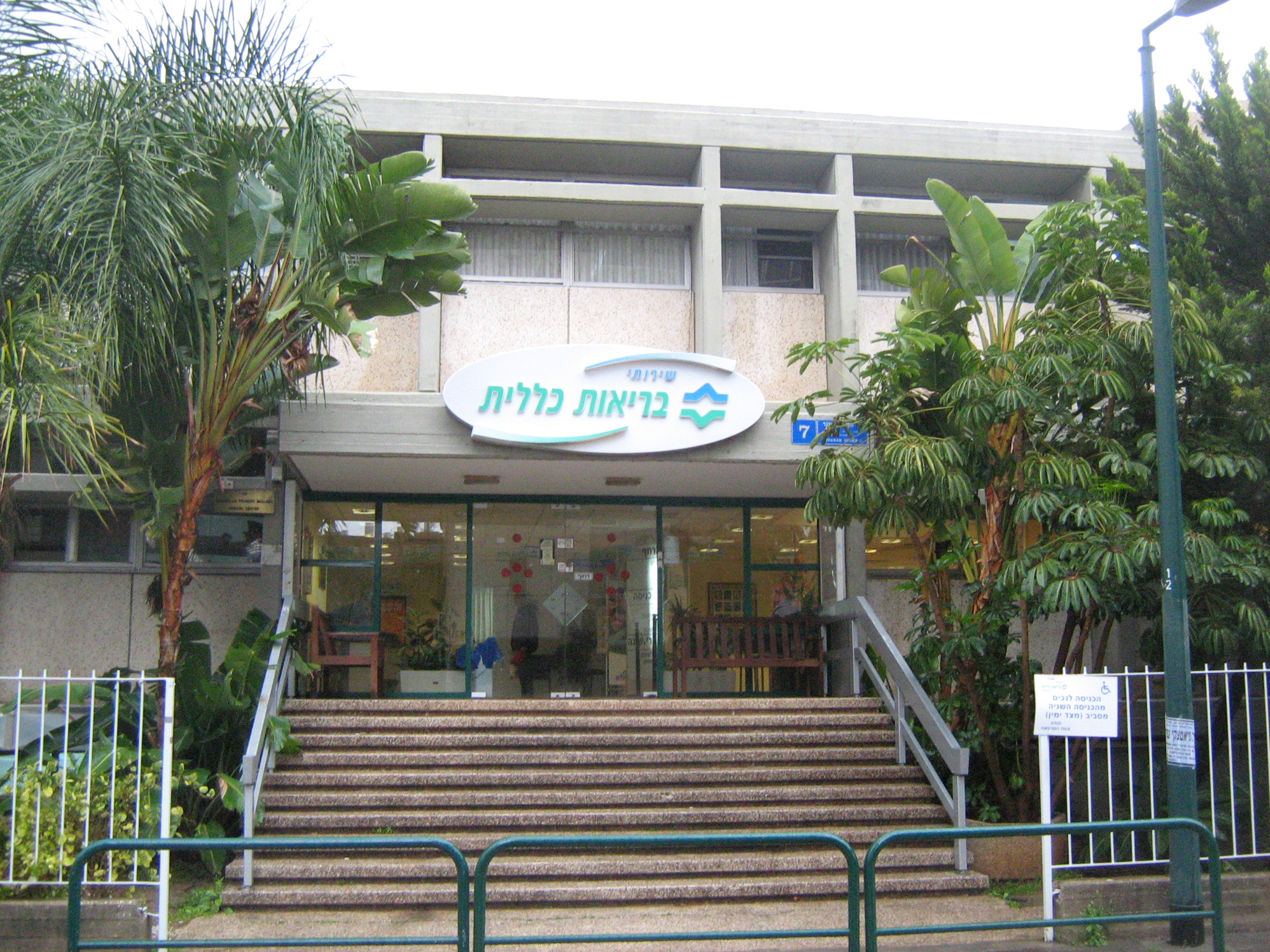
- Formation: December 1911
- Type: Non-profit
- Headquarters: 101 Arlozorov St., Tel Aviv, Israel
- Key people: Prof. Ehud Davidson (CEO)
- Website: www.clalit.co.il

Clalit Health Services, commonly known as Clalit, is the largest of Israel's four state-mandated health service organizations. All Israelis are required by the Israeli National Health Insurance Law to remain enrolled in one of the four mandated providers, which finance and manage public healthcare services.

Clalit is a nonprofit integrated care organization. About 52% of Israelis, or 4.7 million people, are insured by it as of 2021. The organization coordinates an integrated network that includes more than 1,500 primary care clinics, 14 hospitals, and a proprietary chain of pharmacies and dental offices.

== History ==
The first Zionist health insurance fund in the area, Clalit was founded in December 1911 as the Judea Workers' Health Fund at a convention hosted by the Federation of Workers in Judea. In order to give Jewish agricultural laborers health coverage and mutual aid, it started providing medical services in 1913.

Historically, the Histadrut Labor Federation owned and administered Clalit. During this time, enrollment in the Histadrut labor union was a requirement for Clalit membership, and by the mid-1980s, the fund had expanded to include the vast majority of the population. Clalit did not limit admission due to age restrictions or pre-existing medical conditions, in contrast to contemporary alternative sick funds.

After the National Health Insurance Law of 1994 was passed, the structural framework changed fundamentally on 1 January 1995. The law made public insurance mandatory, broke Clalit's institutional ties to the Histadrut, and ensured that all citizens would have open access to all four of the newly regulated providers.

== Facilities and services ==
About 30% of Israel's public hospital beds are managed by Clalit, which operates 14 hospitals connected to universities. Emergency services are available to members of all national health funds, but primary care is reserved for its members.

=== Major hospital network ===
- Soroka Medical Center (established 1960) in Beersheba: Serving more than a million people, it is the largest hospital in the Clalit network that serves as the main tertiary referral center for southern Israel.
- Rabin Medical Center – Beilinson Campus (established 1938) in Petah Tikva: Focuses on neurosurgery, cardiothoracic surgery, and organ transplantation.
- Rabin Medical Center – Golda Campus (established 1942) in Petah Tikva: Focuses on hematological research, home dialysis care, and joint replacements.
- Carmel Medical Center (established 1967) in Haifa: Integrate epidemiological medical services, thoracic surgery, and regional cardiology.

== See also ==
- Health care in Israel
