= Universal health care by country =

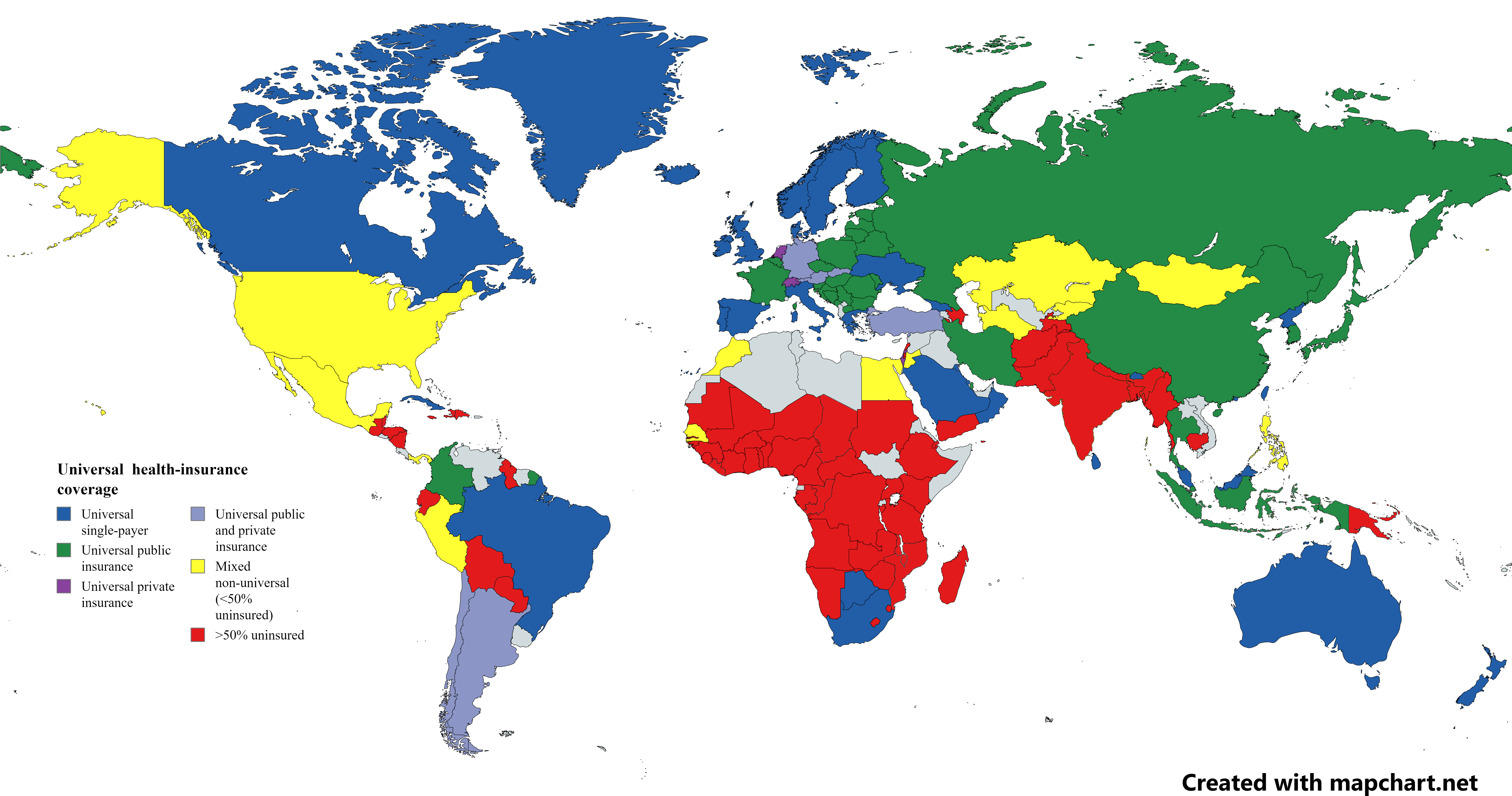
Universal health-insurance coverage systems by country

Universal health coverage index

Tax revenue per capita and public health spending per capita in developing countries in

Government-guaranteed health care for all citizens of a country, often called universal health care, is a broad concept that has been implemented in several ways. The common denominator for all such programs is some form of government action aimed at broadly extending access to health care and setting minimum standards. Most implement universal health care through legislation, regulation, and taxation. Legislation and regulation direct what care must be provided, to whom, and on what basis.

The logistics of such health care systems vary by country. Some programs are paid for entirely out of tax revenues. In others, tax revenues are used either to fund insurance for the very poor or for those needing long-term chronic care. In some cases such as the United Kingdom, government involvement also includes directly managing the health care system, but many countries use mixed public-private systems to deliver universal health care. Alternatively, much of the provision of care can be contracted from the private sector, as in the case of Canada and France. In some instances, such as in Italy and Spain, both these realities may exist at the same time. The government may provide universal health insurance in the form of a social insurance plan that is affordable by all citizens, such as in the case of Germany and Taiwan, although private insurance may provide supplemental coverage to the public health plan. In twenty-five European countries, universal health care entails a government-regulated network of private insurance companies.

== Africa ==
=== Algeria ===
Algeria operates a public and universal healthcare system. A network of hospitals, clinics, and dispensaries provide treatment to the population, with the social security system funding health services, although many people must still cover part of their costs due to the rates paid by the social security system remaining unchanged since 1987. The poor are generally entitled to taxpayer funded health services, while the wealthy pay for treatment according to a sliding scale.

=== Botswana ===
Botswana established a free universal healthcare system that operates a system of public medical centers, with 98% of health facilities in the country run by the government. All citizens are entitled to be treated in taxpayer funded facilities, though a nominal fee of ~70 BWP (~US$6.60) is typically charged for public health services except for sexual reproductive health services and antiretroviral therapy services, which are free.

=== Burkina Faso ===
Burkina Faso provides universal healthcare to citizens through a system called Universal Health Insurance (AMU)—administered by two bodies, one for civilians and the other for the armed forces.

=== Mauritius ===
The government of Mauritius operates a system of medical facilities that provide treatment to citizens, free of charge.

=== Rwanda ===
Rwanda operates a system of universal health insurance through the Ministry of Health called Mutuelle de Santé (Mutual Health), a system of community-based insurance where people pay premiums based on their income level into local health insurance funds, with the wealthiest paying the highest premiums and required to cover a small percentage of their medical expenses, while those at the lowest income levels are exempt from paying premiums and can still utilize the services of their local health fund. In 2012, this system insured all but 4% of the population.

=== Seychelles ===
The government of Seychelles operates a system of medical facilities that provide treatment to citizens, free of charge.

=== Tunisia ===
Tunisia operates a public healthcare system under the National Health Insurance Fund (Caisse Nationale d'Assurance Maladie). All Tunisian citizens and residents can receive treatment in state-run hospitals and clinics for a very low co-pay, while people with the lowest income are able to apply for an exemption from co-pays.

== Asia ==
=== Azerbaijan ===
Medical insurance is mandatory in Azerbaijan. All Azerbaijan citizens are covered under the country's newly introduced universal healthcare policy and are entitled to free medical care. Under the national health insurance system, coverage includes primary, inpatient and outpatient services, emergency care, vaccinations and lab services, among other benefits.

=== Bhutan ===
The Royal Government of Bhutan maintains a policy of free and universal access to primary health care. As hospital facilities in the country are limited, patients with diseases that cannot be treated in Bhutan, such as cancer, are normally referred to hospitals in India for treatment. Such referral treatment is also carried out at the cost of the Royal Government.

=== China ===
As of 2017, more than 97% of people in China are covered by one of three categories of public health insurance. From most generous to least generous, they are the:

1. Urban Employee Basic Medical Insurance (UEBMI, 职工医保)
2. Urban Resident Basic Medical Insurance (URBMI, 居民医保)
3. New Cooperative Medical Service (NCMS, 新农合)

The UEBMI is funded by 6-12% by employers and 2% by employees; the URBMI entirely by local governments, and it covers students, the unemployed, and the retired; and the NCMS by the central government. In 2016, the government announced plans to merge NCMS with URBMI. China also has five private health insurance companies for supplementary care: the three largest are Ping An, PICC, and China Life. For the public plans, the list of covered procedures is limited, and copayment is common. The proportion of out-of-pocket costs depends on profession and location: for example, workers in urban Shanghai might have 85% of their medical costs covered up to $740,000 while workers in rural Guiyang are reimbursed for 65% of their medical costs up to $29,000 annually.

Immediately after the Chinese Communist Revolution in 1949, the state both directly operated all hospitals and clinics. The government paid for healthcare services, and life expectancy improved greatly, although the services provided were basic. State-provided health insurance varied by area: the Cooperative Medical System (CMS) covered rural areas, while the Government Insurance Scheme (GIS) and Labor Insurance Scheme (LIS) covered residents of urban areas. After the reform and opening up in 1978, the state reduced spending on hospitals and allowed them to charge patients for profit. The state, however, did not stop paying for certain healthcare services like mandatory vaccination.

From the high point of privatization of healthcare in the 1990s, China has been reforming with universal health care as a goal in the twenty-first century, as part of the "moderately prosperous society" plan. The New Rural Co-operative Medical Care System (NRCMCS) from 2005, aimed at the rural poor, sets the annual cost of medical coverage at 50 yuan (US$7) per person. As of September 2007, around 80% of the whole rural population of China had signed up (about 685 million people). For patients who go to a small hospital or clinic in their local town, the scheme covers from 70 to 80% of their bill; patients at a county provider get 60% of their cost covered; and in a large modern city hospital, the scheme covers about 30% of the bill.

At the end of 2008, the government published its reform plan clarifying government's responsibility by saying that it would play a dominant role in providing public health and basic medical service. The plan listed public health, rural areas, city community health services and basic medical insurance as four key areas for government investment. It also promised to tighten government control over medical fees in public hospitals and to set up a "basic medicine system" to cover drug costs. China's "Law on Promotion of Basic Medical and Health Care", effective June 2020, asserts that Chinese citizens have a positive right to healthcare, regardless of cost. Additional laws are expected to specify what this right will mean in practice.

=== Cyprus ===
A universal national health system, known as GESY, planned in 2000s and was implemented in Cyprus in June 2019. The new system aims to provide affordable and effective medical care to all people residing permanently in Cyprus. As of June 2022, 917,000 Cypriots have registered[5] with a general practitioner through the GESY system, which is roughly the current population of the Republic of Cyprus.

=== Hong Kong ===
Hong Kong has early health education, professional health services, and well-developed health care and medication system. The life expectancy is 84 for females and 78 for males, which is the second highest in the world, and 2.94 infant mortality rate, the fourth lowest in the world.

There are two medical schools in Hong Kong, and several schools offering courses in traditional Chinese medicine. The Hospital Authority is a statutory body that operates and manages all public hospitals. Hong Kong has high standards of medical practice. It has contributed to the development of liver transplantation, being the first in the world to carry out an adult to adult live donor liver transplant in 1993.

=== India ===
India has consistently developed and invested in the healthcare system of the country since independence. At the federal level, a national public health insurance program was launched in 2018 by the government of India, called Ayushman Bharat. This aimed to cover the bottom 50% (500 million people) of the country's population working in the unorganized sector (enterprises having less than 10 employees) and offers them free treatment at both public and private hospitals. For people working in the organized sector (enterprises with more than 10 employees) and earning a monthly salary of up to ₹21,000 are covered by the social insurance scheme of Employees' State Insurance which entirely funds their healthcare (along with pension and unemployment benefits), both in public and private hospitals. People earning more than that amount are provided health insurance coverage by their employers through the many public or private insurance companies. As of 2020, 300 million Indians are covered by insurance bought from one of the public or private insurance companies by their employers as group or individual plans. Unemployed people without coverage are covered by the various state insurance schemes if they do not have the means to pay for it. In 2019, the total net government spending on healthcare was $36 billion, or 1.23% of its GDP. An outpatient card at AIIMS costs a one-time fee of ₹10 (roughly US$0.20) and thereafter outpatient medical advice is free. In-hospital treatment costs is extremely minimal and depends on the financial condition of the patient and the facilities utilized, but are usually much less than in the private sector. For instance, a patient is waived treatment costs if their income is below the poverty line. However, getting treatment at high quality government hospitals is very tough due to the high number of people needing healthcare and the lack of sufficient facilities.

Primary health care is provided by city and district hospitals and rural primary health centres (PHCs). These hospitals provide treatment free of cost. Primary care is focused on immunization, prevention of malnutrition, pregnancy, child birth, postnatal care, and treatment of common illnesses. Patients who receive specialized care or have complicated illnesses are referred to secondary (often located in district and taluk headquarters) and tertiary care hospitals (located in district and state headquarters or those that are teaching hospitals).. In urban cities and towns like Delhi, there are neighbourhood health clinics called Mohalla Clinics which offer completely free treatment, testing and drugs.

The Indian government has launched Ayushyaman Bharat Yojana (AB-NHPM), which will provide all Indian citizens with insurance coverage for serious illnesses, and free drugs and diagnostic treatments.

=== Indonesia ===
Indonesia is currently building a universal healthcare system with its Jaminan Kesehatan Nasional (JKN) scheme, managed by BPJS Kesehatan, which covers a range of treatments from public providers as well as private providers that opt to participate. The scheme is funded by premiums from the employed. The formally employed pay a premium worth 5% of their salary, with 1% paid by the employee and 4% paid by the employer, while informal workers and the self-employed must pay a fixed monthly premium. As of 2024, 98% of Indonesian population has been covered, though contribution arrears is a recurring problem.

While the country has a number of government-owned hospitals, about 63% are privately owned. Indonesia also operates a three-tier community health system. The Ministry of Health oversees a network of Puskesmas, or community health centers, followed by health sub-centers and village-level integrated posts.

=== Israel ===
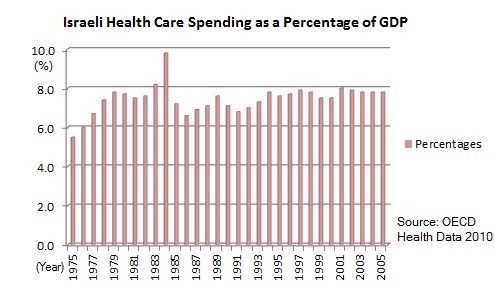
Health care in Israel as a percentage of GDP

Israel has a system of universal healthcare as set out by the 1995 National Health Insurance Law. The state is responsible for providing health services to all residents of the country, who can register with one of the four national health service funds. All citizens pay a health insurance tax. The four Kupot Holim are obligated by the law to offer a minimum package of health services and treatments, known as the Health Basket (סל הבריאות; Sal HaBriut ), to all their members. The Health Basket covers all costs of medical diagnosis and treatment in the areas of family medicine, hospitalization (general, maternity, psychiatric and chronic), preventive medicine, surgery (including elective surgery), transplants, treatment for drug abuse and alcoholism, medical equipment and appliances, first aid and transportation to a medical facility, obstetrics and fertility treatment, medications approved under the National Health Basket (which is updated every year), treatment of chronic diseases and paramedical services such as physiotherapy and occupational therapy, and mental healthcare.

In Israel, the National Health Insurance Law is the legal framework that enables and facilitates basic, compulsory universal health care. Promoted by health minister Haim Ramon in the early 1990s, the Knesset put the law into effect on January 1, 1995—basing it on recommendations from a National Committee of Inquiry headed by Shoshana Netanyahu, which examined restructuring the health care system in Israel in the late 1980s. The main recommendation of this report was to enact a National Health Insurance law which would streamline the management, delivery and public financing of medical services in the country and guarantee a minimum health coverage level to all citizens. The recommendation was promoted by Health Minister Haim Ramon and the National Health Insurance Law was passed by the Knesset in 1994 and came into effect on January 1, 1995. After enactment of the 1995 law, membership in one of the four Kupot Holim became mandatory while acceptance into any of them was legally guaranteed, Clalit's linkage with the Histadrut was severed, and Israeli residents became entitled to the same minimum basic basket of services regardless of which fund they belonged to, and were permitted to switch between funds once a year.

Under the National Health Insurance Law, membership in one of the four following health funds, or Kupot Holim (Patient Funds) is compulsory for all residents of Israel: Clalit, Maccabi, Meuhedet and Leumit. Clalit is the largest of the four. As of 2024, just over half of the population (50.96%) belonging to Clalit, followed by Maccabi (27.48%), Meuhedet (13.99%) and Leumit (7.57%). The four Kupot Holim are obligated by the law to offer a minimum package of health services and treatments, known as the Health Basket (סל הבריאות; Sal HaBriut ), to all their members. The law established a system of direct oversight of the Kupot Holim by the state, and certain services are under the direct administration of the State, usually by means of the Ministry of Health. The health funds cannot reject any applicant for any reason, including age or preexisting conditions.

The Health Basket covers all costs of medical diagnosis and treatment in the areas of family medicine, hospitalization (general, maternity, psychiatric and chronic), preventive medicine, surgery (including elective surgery), transplants, treatment for drug abuse and alcoholism, medical equipment and appliances, first aid and transportation to a medical facility, obstetrics and fertility treatment, medications approved under the National Health Basket (which is updated every year), treatment of chronic diseases and paramedical services such as physiotherapy and occupational therapy, and mental healthcare. Medications for serious illnesses that are part of the official "basket of medications" formulary (which is large and updated regularly, but does not include all medications) are covered, though patients must partially pay for these medications with copays: medications included in the basket are covered at rates that vary from 50% to 90%. IVF treatments for the first two children up to the age of 45 and in certain cases abortions are also covered.

A committee appointed by the health ministry reviews the contents of the health basket on a yearly basis and determines which new treatments will be added to it within the constraints of the annual budget allocated to the basket by the government.

In general, each Kupat Holim allows members to choose a primary care physician and specialists from a list of healthcare providers associated with the fund.

While the Kupot Holim typically cover medical treatment in Israel, they can fund medical procedures abroad when the procedure in question cannot be obtained in Israel. There is a cap of $250,000 without copay to fund treatment abroad, though that limit can be waived by the Director-General of the Health Ministry.

Members of each Kupat Holim can switch to another once a year. There are six specified dates on which people can transfer, depending on when they signed up for their previous one. In special circumstances, it is possible to petition the Ministry of Health to cancel a change or register earlier than an official date.

The National Health Insurance Law sets out a system of public funding for health services by means of a progressive health tax, administered by Bituah Leumi, or the National Insurance Institute, Israel's social security organization, which transfers funding to the Kupot Holim according to a capitation formula based on the number of members in each fund, the age distribution of members, and a number of other indices. The Kupot Holim also receive some direct government funding. The government provides the Kupot Holim relatively wide discretion in determining how to spend their public funding, with the condition that the Kupot Holim must guarantee providing the treatments set forth in the health basket as a minimum service to their members.

For the health tax, wage-earners and the self-employed must pay 3.1% of their monthly salary up to 60% of the average prevailing market wage (appx. NIS 6,300 in 2020), and 5% of anything earned above it. Employers are legally obligated to deduct insurance contributions from their employees' salaries, while the self-employed must arrange payment on their own. Pensioners have contributions deducted from their pensions, as do those receiving unemployment benefits. Only a select few categories of people are exempt from paying health premiums. Dependent minors are exempt. Housewives who do not work are exempt unless they receive a pension or their spouse receives an increment to a pension. Those receiving old-age pension benefits from Bituah Leumi (i.e., most of the elderly people in Israel) pay a reduced flat rate and any additional income they have is exempted from the health tax. In addition, people who immigrate to Israel under the Law of Return, and Israeli citizens who were born abroad or left as minors, and who settle in Israel are entitled to one year of free health insurance if they are not working, subject to some exceptions.

While the vast majority of public health services are covered by the Kupot Holim under the National Health Insurance Law, pre-natal, post-natal, and geriatric care services are run directly by the Ministry of Health.

Government spending on healthcare is about 60% of the total, considerably below the average for OECD countries of 72%.

Although most residents are covered under the National Health Insurance Law, some exceptions apply to people who receive state-funded healthcare through other means. All soldiers except those who were found medically unfit for service but volunteered are not covered by their Kupat Holim during their military service, but receive healthcare through the military healthcare system. Upon leaving the military, soldiers rejoin their previous Kupat Holim. Disabled veterans are covered by the Ministry of Defense. In addition, some disabled World War II veterans and victims of the Nazis are eligible for certain types of health benefits from the Ministry of Finance. New immigrants who have not yet registered with a Kupat Holim and are in immediate need of healthcare can apply for coverage from the Public Ombudsman of the Ministry of Health.

=== Japan ===
All residents of Japan are required by the law to have health insurance coverage. People without insurance from employers can participate in a national health insurance programme, administered by local governments. Patients are free to select physicians or facilities of their choice and cannot be denied coverage. Hospitals, by law, must be run as non-profit and be managed by physicians.

=== Kuwait ===
Kuwait offers universal healthcare.

=== Macau ===
Macau offers universally accessible single-payer system funded by taxes. Health care is provided by the Health Bureau.

=== Malaysia ===
Malaysia has achieved universal health coverage. It has made remarkable progress in improving health outcomes over the past seven decades. At the time of Independence, the number of infant deaths was 75.5 per 1,000 live births. This has since fallen by more than 90 percent to 6.7 deaths per 1,000 live births in 2016. Maternal mortality which refers to the death of a woman caused by her pregnancy, during and after delivery, has also decreased by 89% between 1963 and 2013. However, the government under Mahathir Mohamad showed a distaste for this system and since 1988 has contemplated plans for a transition towards a residuals-based system where universal coverage would be restricted to lower income groups while middle and above classes would be relegated to a privatised insurance-based system.

=== Maldives ===
Aasandha is the national healthcare insurance scheme of the Maldives. It provides taxpayer-funded medical assistance to all Maldivian citizens. National Social Protection Agency of Maldives was formed under the National Social Health Insurance Act on August 27, 2008. It is mandated to administer the National Social Health Insurance Scheme and by an executive order under the same act mandated to conduct social protection programs identified by the government of Maldives. NSPA is also the responsible agency to regulate and conduct Social Protection programs under the Social Protection Act.

=== Pakistan ===
Some of Pakistan's provinces have universal healthcare coverage. The Government of Khyber Pakhtunkhwa launched a "universal health insurance programme" known as the "Sehat Insaf Card" to provide free healthcare for the residence of KPK, where families would be covered up to Rs. 10 lakh (US$3,600) for treatment. This was further expanded to the Punjab province of Pakistan, in December 2021, to cover more than 31 million families. Prime Minister Imran Khan announced that an additional Rs. 440 billion (US$1.6 billion) would be spent to cover the entire province.

=== Philippines ===
Filipinos are covered under the National Health Insurance Program (NHIP) of the Philippine government-owned Philippine Health Insurance Corporation or PhilHealth. Under the Universal Health Care Law of 2019, all Filipinos were automatically enrolled in the NHIP.

=== Saudi Arabia ===
The government of Saudi Arabia provides free universal health coverage for all citizens. Non-citizens are required by law to have private insurance paid for by their employer.

=== Singapore ===
Singapore has a universal health care system where government ensures affordability, largely through compulsory savings and price controls, while the private sector provides most care. Overall spending on health care amounts to only 3% of annual GDP. Of that, 66% comes from private sources. Singapore currently has the second lowest infant mortality rate in the world and among the highest life expectancies from birth, according to the World Health Organization. Singapore has "one of the most successful healthcare systems in the world, in terms of both efficiency in financing and the results achieved in community health outcomes", according to an analysis by global consulting firm Watson Wyatt. Singapore's system uses a combination of compulsory savings from payroll deductions (funded by both employers and workers) a nationalized health insurance plan, and government subsidies, as well as "actively regulating the supply and prices of healthcare services in the country" to keep costs in check; the specific features have been described as potentially a "very difficult system to replicate in many other countries." Many Singaporeans also have supplemental private health insurance (often provided by employers) for services not covered by the government's programs.

=== South Korea ===
South Koreans have access to a universal healthcare safety net, although a significant portion of healthcare is privately funded.

=== North Korea ===
North Korea claims to provide universal health care with a national medical service and health insurance system. It claims that health services are offered for free. However, this claim has been contrasted by North Korean defectors, who claim that patients must in fact pay for health services, that the upper classes have access to a higher standard of healthcare than ordinary ones do, and that "how much money a patient has determines whether they live or die".

=== Sri Lanka ===
Sri Lanka provides free universal healthcare to their citizens.

=== Taiwan ===
The current health care system in Taiwan, known as National Health Insurance (NHI), was instituted in 1995. NHI is a single-payer compulsory social insurance plan that centralizes the disbursement of health care dollars. The system promises equal access to health care for all citizens, and the population coverage had reached 99% by the end of 2004. NHI is mainly financed through premiums based on the payroll tax, and is supplemented with out-of-pocket payments and direct government funding. In the initial stage, fee-for-service predominated for both public and private providers.

NHI delivers universal coverage offered by a government-run insurer. The working population pays premiums split with their employers, others pay a flat rate with government help and the poor or veterans are fully subsidized.

Under this model, citizens have free range to choose hospitals and physicians without using a gatekeeper and do not have to worry about waiting lists. NHI offers a comprehensive benefit package that covers preventive medical services, prescription drugs, dental services, Chinese medicine, home nurse visits and many more. Since NHI, the previously uninsured have increased their usage of medical services. Most preventive services are free such as annual checkups and maternal and child care. Regular office visits have co-payments as low as US$5 per visit. Co-payments are fixed and unvaried by the person's income.

=== Thailand ===
Thailand introduced universal coverage reforms in 2001, becoming one of only a handful of lower-middle income countries to do so at the time. Means-tested health care for low income households was replaced by a new and more comprehensive insurance scheme, originally known as the 30 baht project, in line with the small co-payment charged for treatment. People joining the scheme receive a gold card that they use to access services in their health district, and, if necessary, get referrals for specialist treatment elsewhere. The bulk of finance comes from public revenues, with funding allocated to Contracting Units for Primary Care annually on a population basis. According to the WHO, 65% of Thailand's health care expenditure in 2004 came from the government, and 35% was from private sources. Although the reforms have received a good deal of critical comment, they have proved popular with poorer Thais, especially in rural areas, and survived the change of government after the 2006 military coup. The then Public Health Minister, Mongkol Na Songkhla, abolished the 30 baht co-payment and made the UC scheme free. It is not yet clear whether the scheme will be modified further under the coalition government that came to power in January 2008.

In 2016, Thailand became the first country in Asia to eliminate HIV transmission from mother to child, owing to its robust public healthcare system.

=== Turkey ===
Turkey achieved universal health coverage in 2003.

The Turkish government's Health Transformation Program of 2003 established a common benefit package that covers primary and preventive care, ambulatory and inpatient care, laboratory services, rehabilitation and follow-up services, pharmaceuticals and medical aids and appliances. Payroll taxes of 12.5% of a person's gross income (5% by the employee and 7.5% by the employer) fund 97% of the program. The government provides for the remaining 3% of the cost.

=== United Arab Emirates ===
The United Arab Emirates has enacted federal legislation that requires universal healthcare nationals and mandatory health insurance for expatriates, but this legislation has not yet been implemented across the entire country.

== Europe ==
Almost all European countries have healthcare available for all citizens. Most European countries have systems of competing private health insurance companies, along with government regulation and subsidies for citizens who cannot afford health insurance premiums. Countries with universal healthcare include Austria, Belarus, Croatia, Czech Republic, Denmark, Finland, France, Germany, Greece, Iceland, Italy, Latvia, Lithuania, Luxembourg, Malta, Moldova, North Macedonia, Norway, Portugal, Romania, Russia, Serbia, Slovenia, Spain, Sweden, Switzerland, Ukraine, and the United Kingdom.

=== Albania ===
Albania operates a mixed public and private healthcare system overseen by the Ministry of Health and Social Protection. The system is not yet fully universal. Public healthcare is primarily funded through mandatory health insurance contributions and government subsidies, though a significant portion of the population remains uninsured, largely due to informal employment.

Out-of-pocket payments account for a large share of total health spending, making access to care difficult for low-income households. According to the World Health Organization, about one-third of Albanians lack health insurance, 8% of households are pushed into or further into poverty by healthcare costs, and 12% experience catastrophic health spending.

Reforms since 2015 have expanded access, including free annual checkups and primary care visits for uninsured individuals. However, patients continue to pay substantial co-payments for medicines and specialist care.

=== Armenia ===
Armenia operates a mandatory social health insurance system. The majority of the population is enrolled in the Compulsory Health Insurance Fund, which is funded through payroll taxes and contributions from employers and employees.

=== Austria ===
Healthcare in Austria is universal for residents of Austria, as well as those from other EU countries. Austria has a two-tier payment system in which many individuals receive basic publicly funded care; they also have the option to purchase supplementary private health insurance.

=== Belgium ===
Belgium has a universal health care system.Citizens must register for public and private health coverage plans known as sickness funds. Healthcare in Belgium is composed of three parts. Firstly, there is a primarily publicly funded healthcare and social security service run by the federal government, which organises and regulates healthcare; independent private/public practitioners, university/semi-private hospitals and care institutions.Belgian citizens pay first for many medical services, such as dostor visits, and then apply for reimbursement from the government health insurance fund. Patients using the European Health Insurance Card pay for the healthcare themselves and then apply to the Belgian government for reimbursement.There are a few (commercially run for-profit) private hospitals. Secondly is the insurance coverage provided for patients. Finally, industry coverage covers the production and distribution of healthcare products for research and development. The primary aspect of this research is done in universities and hospitals. The health coverage system is funded through a variety of taxes. The tax rate on employment income in Belgium is the highest in Europe. It is also the highest rate in the world.The rate is 50.8%. The standard VAT rate is 21%.

=== Croatia ===
Croatia has a universal health care system that provides medical services and is coordinated by the Ministry of Health. The population is covered by a basic health insurance plan provided by statute and by optional insurance. It is administered by the Croatian Health Insurance Fund. In 2012, annual compulsory healthcare related expenditures reached 21.0 billion kunas (c. 2.8 billion euro). There are hundreds of healthcare institutions in Croatia, including 79 hospitals and clinics with 25,285 beds, caring for more than 760 thousand patients per year, 5,792 private practice offices and 79 emergency medical service units.

=== Czech Republic ===
Czech Republic has a universal public health system paid largely from taxation. Private health care systems do co-exist freely alongside public ones, sometimes offering better quality or faster service. Almost all medical services are covered by health insurance and insurance companies, though certain services such as prescription drugs or vision and dental care are only covered partially.

=== Denmark ===
Denmark has a universal public health system paid largely from taxation with local municipalities delivering health care services in the same way as other Scandinavian countries. Primary care is provided by a general practitioner service run by private doctors contracting with the local regions with payment on a mixed per capita and fee for service basis. Most hospitals are run by the regions (only 1% of hospital beds are in the private sector).

=== Estonia ===
Estonia's health care system is based on compulsory insurance based on solidarity funding and on universal access to services provided by private service providers. About 94% of the population is covered by insurance.

=== Finland ===
In Finland, responsibility for organising public healthcare passed from the municipalities to 21 self-governing wellbeing services counties on 1 January 2023, as part of a reform that also covered social welfare and rescue services. The counties are funded mainly by central government and may also levy client fees. Uusimaa is divided into four counties, the City of Helsinki continues to organise its own services, and the HUS Group is responsible for demanding specialised healthcare. Private provision is mainly in the primary care sector. There are a few private hospitals. The main hospitals are either municipally owned (funded from local taxes) or run by the medical teaching universities (funded jointly by the municipalities and the national government). According to a survey published by the European Commission in 2000, Finland's is in the top 4 of EU countries in terms of satisfaction with their hospital care system: 88% of Finnish respondents were satisfied compared with the EU average of 41.3%. Finnish health care expenditures are below the European average. The private medical sector accounts for about 14 percent of total health care spending. Only 8% of doctors choose to work in private practice, and some of these also choose to do some work in the public sector.

Taxation funding is partly local and partly nationally based. The national social insurance institution KELA reimburses part of patients prescription costs and makes a contribution towards private medical costs (including dentistry) if they choose to be treated in the private sector rather than the public sector. Patient access charges are subject to annual caps. For example, GP visits cost €11 per visit with annual €33 cap; hospital outpatient treatment €22 per visit; a hospital stay, including food, medical care, and medicine €26 per 24 hours, or €12 if in a psychiatric hospital. After a patient has spent €683 per year on public medical services, all further treatment in that year is covered (although the required initial deductible is reviewed annually, so it may vary). There is a separate reimbursement system for prescribed medicine: after paying €578 per year, the remaining bought medicine will have a maximum price of €2.50 per purchase.

Finland has a highly decentralized three-level public system of health care and alongside this, a much smaller private health care system. Overall, the municipalities (funded by taxation, local and national) meet about two thirds of all medical care costs, with the remaining one third paid by the national insurance system (nationally funded), and by private finance (either employer-funded or met by patients themselves). Private inpatient care forms about 3–4% of all inpatient care. In 1999 only 17 per cent of total funding for health care came from insurance, comprising 14.9% statutory (government) insurance and 2.1% private health insurance. Eyeglasses are not publicly subsidized at all, although dentistry is available as a municipal service or can be obtained privately with partial reimbursement from the state.

The percentage of total health expenditure financed by taxation in Finland (78%) is above the OECD average and similar to the levels seen in Germany (77%) and France (80%) but below the level seen in the UK (87%). The quality of service in Finnish health care, as measured by patient satisfaction, is excellent. According to a survey published by the European Commission in 2000, Finland has one of the highest ratings of patient satisfaction with their hospital care system in the EU: 88% of Finnish respondents were satisfied compared with the EU average of 41.3%.

There are caps on total medical expenses that are met out-of-pocket for drugs and hospital treatments. The National Insurance system pays all necessary costs over these caps. Public spending on health care in 2006 was 13.6 billion euros (equivalent to US$338 per person per month). The increase over 2005 at 8.2 per cent was below the OECD average of 9 percent. Household budgets directly met 18.7 per cent of all health care costs.

=== France ===
France has a system of health care largely financed by government through a system of national health insurance. Nonetheless, not all medical care is paid for by the state, with only 70% of initial GP care covered and anywhere between 35% and 100% of prescription medication covered. It is consistently ranked as one of the best in the world.

=== Georgia ===
In 2013, Georgia adopted a universal health care system. Healthcare in Georgia is provided by a universal health care system under which the state funds medical treatment in a mainly privatized system of medical facilities. In 2013, the enactment of a universal health care program triggered universal coverage of government-sponsored medical care of the population and improving access to health care services. Responsibility for purchasing publicly financed health services lies with the Social Service Agency (SSA). However, according to the UN, due to the high out-of-pocket costs that patients incur, Georgia has not yet achieved universal healthcare.

=== Germany ===
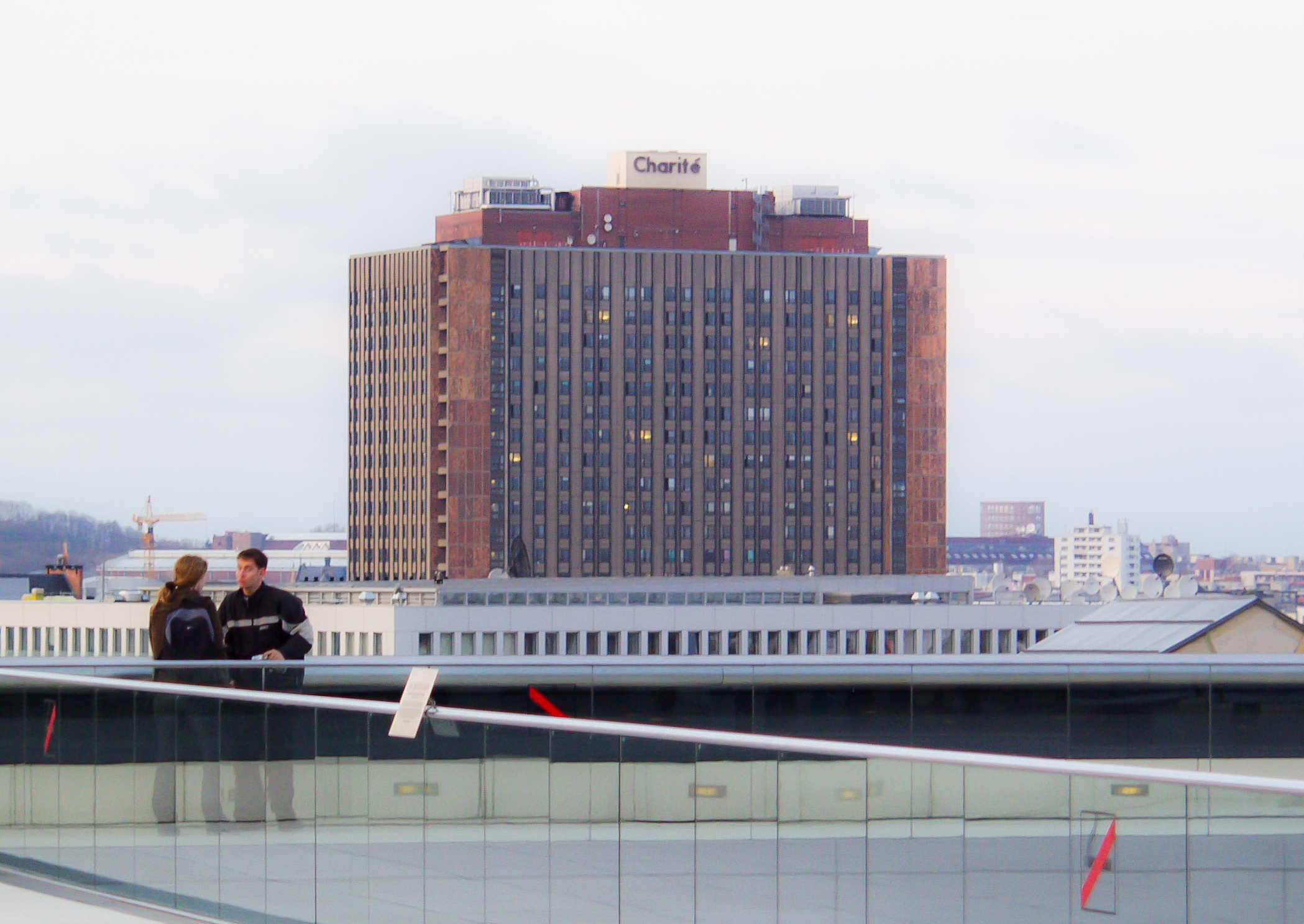
The Charité (Hospital) in Berlin

Germany has the world's oldest national social health insurance system, with origins dating back to Otto von Bismarck's Sickness Insurance Law of 1883. The system is decentralized with private practice physicians providing ambulatory care, and independent, mostly non-profit hospitals providing the majority of inpatient care. Employers pay for half of their employees' health insurance contributions, while self-employed workers pay the entire contribution themselves. Approximately 90% of the population is covered by a statutory health insurance plan, which provides a standardized level of coverage through any one of approximately 90 public sickness funds.

Purchasing basic health insurance is mandatory for all persons residing in Germany if not employed. Historically, the level of provider reimbursement for specific services is determined through negotiations between regional physician's associations and sickness funds. Since 1976 the government has convened an annual commission, composed of representatives of business, labor, physicians, hospitals, and insurance and pharmaceutical industries. The commission takes into account government policies and makes recommendations to regional associations with respect to overall expenditure targets. In 1986 expenditure caps were implemented and were tied to the age of the local population as well as the overall wage increases. Although reimbursement of providers is on a fee-for-service basis, the amount to be reimbursed for each service is determined retrospectively to ensure that spending targets are not exceeded. Capitated care, such as that provided by U.S. health maintenance organizations, has been considered as a cost containment mechanism but would require consent of regional medical associations, and has not materialized.

Copayments were introduced in the 1980s in an attempt to prevent overutilization and control costs. The average length of hospital stay in Germany has decreased significantly in recent decades, falling from 14 days to approximately 7.2 days by 2024, though it remains longer than average stays in the U.S. (approx. 5 to 6 days). This difference is partly attributed to the historical reimbursement structure, although Germany has since transitioned to a system based on diagnosis-related groups (DRGs).

Despite ongoing cost-containment efforts, overall health care expenditures have continued to rise. In 2024, total health expenditure in Germany reached €538.2 billion, representing 12.4% of the gross domestic product (GDP). The financing is primarily provided by the statutory health insurance (GKV) with €300.8 billion, followed by social long-term care insurance (€64.7 billion), private households (€65.0 billion), and private health insurance (€44.8 billion). This expenditure remains comparable to other high-income Western European nations, but is still lower than the percentage of GDP spent in the United States.

=== Greece ===
The Greek healthcare system provides high quality medical services to insured citizens and is coordinated by the Ministry for Health and Social Solidarity. Public health services are provided by the National Healthcare Service, or ESY (Greek: Εθνικό Σύστημα Υγείας, ΕΣΥ). In 2010 there were 35,000 hospital beds and 131 hospitals in the country.

The Greek healthcare system has received high rankings by the World Health Organization, ranked 14th in the overall assessment and 11th in quality of service in a 2000 report by the WHO. The data listed above is from 2000.

=== Iceland ===
Iceland has a universal public health system paid largely from taxation with local municipalities delivering health care services in the same way as the Scandinavian countries. Iceland's entire population has equal access to health care services.

=== Ireland ===
The public health care system in Ireland is governed by the Health Act 2004, which established a new body to be responsible for providing health and personal social services to everyone living in Ireland – the Health Service Executive. The new national health service came into being officially on January 1, 2005; however, the new structures are currently in the process of being established as the reform program continues. In addition to the public-sector, there is a large private health care market.

In Ireland, 28% of the population hold a medical card that gives the holder access to free GP (doctor) care and caps prescription drugs at €1.50. A separate 10% of the population holds a GP visit-card which provides free GP care. For those who do not have a medical card or a GP visit-card, the average price for an appointment with a GP is €50 to €90.The standard charge for Irish and EU citizens who attend the A&E in hospitals is €100 but the fee is waived if referred by a GP. Ireland is currently in the process of establishing a universal healthcare system known as Sláintecare.

=== Italy ===
Italy has a public health care service for all the residents called "Servizio Sanitario Nazionale" or SSN (National Health Service). It is publicly run and funded mostly by taxation. Some services require variable co-pays, while other services (such as emergency medicine and a general doctor) are free. Medication is mostly covered. There is also a small parallel private health care system, especially in the field of dentistry and optometry. It is consistently ranked as one of the best in the world, especially in the Northern regions.

=== Latvia ===
Healthcare in Latvia is universal for citizens of Latvia. The healthcare system in Latvia operates as a universal program that is primarily funded through government taxation. It bears similarities to the National Health Service (NHS) in UK and employs a purchaser-provider split (PPS). Following several reforms, a National Health Service (NHS) type system, known as Nacionālais veselības dienests (NVD) in Latvian, was established in 2011.

The NVD controls the implementation of healthcare policies while the Ministry of Health develops policies and oversees the system. Healthcare services are available for free for citizens of Latvia. The country's Ministry of Health manages its healthcare system through a combination of social insurance institutional body, legislative healthcare provision financed by taxes and numerous public and private providers.

Despite near-universal population coverage provided by the NVD established in 2011, there are challenges to equitable access with issues around geographical distribution of health professionals, user charges and long waiting lists. The publicly funded health benefits package is limited in scope and only covers a predetermined set of services.

=== Lithuania ===
The public healthcare system in Lithuania ensures free healthcare for almost all its citizens. This state-funded healthcare is available to long-term residents and expats too.

=== Luxembourg ===
Luxembourg provides universal health care coverage to all residents (Luxembourgers and foreigners) by the National Health Insurance (CNS - Caisse nationale de santé (French) or National Gesondheetskeess (Luxembourgish)). It is funded by mandatory contributions of employers and the workforce, and by government subsidies for insuring jobseekers, the poor, and for financing medical infrastructure. The nation also has mandatory public long-term care insurance.

=== Netherlands ===
The Netherlands has a dual-level system. All primary and curative care (family doctors, hospitals, and clinics) is financed from private compulsory insurance. Long-term care for the elderly, the dying, the long-term mentally ill etc. is covered by social insurance funded by public spending. According to the WHO, the health care system in the Netherlands was 62% government-funded and 38% privately funded as of 2004.

Insurance companies must offer a core universal insurance package for universal primary, curative care, including the cost of all prescription medicines. They must do this at a fixed price for all. People pay the same premium whether young or old, healthy or sick. It is illegal in The Netherlands for insurers to refuse an application for health insurance, to impose special conditions (e.g., exclusions, deductibles, co-pays etc.), or refuse to fund treatments that a doctor has determined are medically necessary. The system is 50% financed from payroll taxes paid by employers to a fund controlled by the Health regulator. The government contributes an additional 5% to the regulator's fund. The remaining 45% is collected as premiums paid by the insured directly to the insurance company. Some employers negotiate bulk deals with health insurers and some even pay the employees' premiums as an employment benefit. The regulator has sight of the claims made by policyholders and therefore can redistribute the funds its holds on the basis of relative claims made by policy holders. Thus insurers with high payouts receive more from the regulator than those with low payouts. Insurance companies have no incentive to deter high-cost individuals from taking insurance and are compensated if they have to pay out more than might be expected. Insurance companies compete with each other on price for the 45% direct premium part of the funding and try to negotiate deals with hospitals to keep costs low. The competition regulator is charged with checking for abuse of dominant market positions and the creation of cartels that act against consumer interests. An insurance regulator ensures that all basic policies have identical coverage rules so that no person is medically disadvantaged by his or her choice of insurer.

Hospitals in the Netherlands are also regulated and inspected but are mostly privately run and not-for-profit, as are many of the insurance companies. Patients can choose where they want to be treated, and have access to information on the internet about the performance and waiting times at each hospital. Patients dissatisfied with their insurer and choice of hospital can cancel at any time but must make a new agreement with another insurer.

Insurance companies can offer additional services at an extra cost over and above the universal system laid down by the regulator, e.g., for dental care. The standard monthly premium for health care paid by individual adults is about €100 per month. Persons with low incomes can get assistance from the government if they cannot afford these payments. Children under 18 are insured by the system at no additional cost to them or their families because the insurance company receives the cost of this from the regulator's fund. There is a fixed yearly deductible of €385 for each adult person, excluding first visits for diagnosis to general physicians.

=== Norway ===
Norway has a universal public health system paid largely from taxation in the same way as other Scandinavian countries. The Norwegian health care system is government-funded and heavily decentralized. The health care system in Norway is financed primarily through taxes levied by county councils and municipalities. Dental care is included for children until 18 years old, and is covered for adults for some ailments.

Norway regularly comes top or close to the top of worldwide healthcare rankings.

=== North Macedonia ===
The country inherited a large health infrastructure after independence in 1991 with good well-distributed public health services. Private hospitals were opened and primary care was privatised. Subsequently, both public and private providers have been integrated into one social insurance-funded model managed by the Health Insurance Fund of North Macedonia. The public hospital sector is seen as inefficient and is unpopular with both patients and professional staff. 90% of the population is within 30 minutes of a health service.

Expenditure on healthcare was $851 per head in 2014, 6.5% of GDP.

According to the Euro health consumer index, the Macedonian health system made the most remarkable advance of any country in the history of their Index, from 27th to 16th place in 2014, because by implementing a real-time e-Booking system they reduced waiting lists so significantly. From July 2013, any GP can make a booking at any specialist or heavy diagnostic equipment in the country in real-time while the patient is present. They rated North Macedonia 16th in Europe in 2015.

The Doctor's Chamber of Macedonia complains that there is a discrepancy between the available funds and the quality of service expected, that facilities are not used efficiently, equipment is outdated and staff are not used effectively.

=== Poland ===
Healthcare in Poland is insurance based, delivered through a publicly-funded health care system, called the National Health Fund, which is free for all the citizens of Poland, provided they fall into the "insured" category (usually meaning that they have health insurance paid for by their employer, or are the spouse or child of an insured person).

=== Portugal ===
Portugal's National Healthcare Service, known nationally as Serviço Nacional de Saúde (SNS), is a universal and free healthcare service provided nationwide since 1979 and available to both Portuguese and foreign residents. In 2014, Portugal SNS ranked 13th best healthcare service in Europe. The National Medical Emergency Institute (INEM) is the main emergency medical service and can be activated by calling 112.

=== Romania ===
According to Article 34 of the constitution of Romania, the state is obligated "to guarantee the protection of healthcare". Romania has a fully universal healthcare system, which covers medical check-ups, surgical interventions, and any postoperative medical care, as well as free or subsidized medicine for a range of diseases. The state is also obliged to fund public hospitals and clinics. Dental care is not funded by the state, although there are public dental clinics in some hospitals, which treat patients free of charge.

=== Russia ===
In the former Soviet Union, the preferred term was "socialist medicine"; the Russian language has no term to distinguish between "socialist" and "socialized" (other than "public", Rus: obshchestvenniy/общественный, sometimes "collectivized" or "nationalized", Rus: obobshchestvlenniy/обобществленный).

Russia in Soviet times (between 1917 and 1991) had a totally socialist model of health care with a centralized, integrated, hierarchically organised government providing free health care to all citizens. Quality of care and access to medications was not equal however and was dependent on the social status of patient. The best care was provided for nomenklatura and their family members, who had been segregated from the rest of population facilities, such as Kremlin hospital. Initially successful at combating infectious diseases, the effectiveness of the socialized model declined with underinvestment. Despite a doubling in the number of hospital beds and doctors per capita between 1950 and 1980, the quality of care began to decline by the early 1980s and medical care and health outcomes were below western standards.

The new mixed economy Russia has switched to a mixed model of health care with private financing and provision running alongside state financing and provision. The OECD reported that unfortunately, none of this has worked out as planned and the reforms have in many respects made the system worse. The population's health has deteriorated on virtually every measure. The resulting system is overly complex and very inefficient. It has little in common with the model envisaged by the reformers. Although there are more than 300 private insurers and numerous public ones in the market, real competition for patients is rare leaving most patients with little or no effective choice of insurer, and in many places, no choice of health care provider either. The insurance companies have failed to develop as active, informed purchasers of health care services. Most are passive intermediaries, making money by simply channelling funds from regional OMS funds to healthcare providers.

Article 41 of the Constitution of the Russian Federation confirms a citizen's right to state healthcare and medical assistance free of charge. This is achieved through state compulsory medical insurance (OMS), which is funded by an obligatory medical insurance payroll tax and government subsidies. It is worth mentioning that Russian citizens never pay taxes for themselves and often don't even know how much taxes they pay, because tax payment process is maintained by companies they are working on. Introduction in 1993 reform of new free market providers in addition to the state-run institutions intended to promote both efficiency and patient choice. A purchaser-provider split helps facilitate the restructuring of care, as resources would migrate to where there was greatest demand, reduce the excess capacity in the hospital sector and stimulate the development of primary care. Russian Prime Minister Vladimir Putin announced a new large-scale health care reform in 2011 and pledged to allocate more than 300 billion rubles ($10 billion) in the next few years to improve health care in the country. As of 2020 the health insurance tax (called deposition to an OMS fund) is 5.1%.

=== Serbia ===
The constitution of Serbia states that it is the right of every citizen to seek medical assistance, free of charge. This is achieved by mutual contribution to the Compulsory Social Healthcare Fund of RZZO (Republički Zavod za Zdravstveno Osiguranje or National Health Insurance Institution). The amount of contribution depends on the amount of money the person is making.

=== Spain ===
Spain provides a public universal health care system for all citizens and, under certain conditions, also non-citizens. Healthcare is free except for co-payments for some products and services; it is mostly paid from the Social Security budget. Adult dental care is not covered but for basic extractions or problems that could result in serious stomatological conditions.

Irrespective of the nationality and insurance situation of the patient, the public system always treats medical emergencies until achieving the best possible outcome. If not covered by the Spanish Social Security (i.e., a visiting foreigner), the provider later negotiates payment with the patient or the patient's insurer. If actually unable to pay, it is covered by Social Security on humanitarian grounds unless the patient purposely traveled to Spain to get free healthcare. Obvious unexpected emergencies such as accidental injuries or sudden illness are customarily covered, but those that could be reasonably expected (e.g., arising from a chronic condition or from avoidable risk-taking) are studied on a case-per-case basis.

According to the World Economic Forum and to Bloomberg, Spain has the most efficient health system in Europe, and also ranks at the top worldwide along with Hong Kong, Japan and Singapore.

Private health insurance is available for those who prefer it, and recommended for visitors not covered by the Spanish Social Security or a foreign public or private insurer with overseas coverage.

The health system is organized territorially, with health services decentralized, allowing the 16 autonomous regions of Spain to operate their own health systems. Notwithstanding decentralization, in recent years the central government has begun to enforce national regulations that may be perceived as an effort to centralize the country's health system.

=== Sweden ===
Sweden has a universal public health care system paid for through taxation. The Swedish public and private health care systems are funded through taxes levied by the county councils. Government-paid dental care is accessible to those under 23 years old.

Sweden also has a smaller private health care sector, mainly in larger cities or as centers for preventive health care financed by employers.

In recent years the health care system of Sweden has been heavily criticized for not providing the same quality of health care to all Swedish citizens. The disparity of health care quality in Sweden is growing. Swedish citizens of other ethnicities than Swedish, and citizens who are of a lower socio-economic class, receive a significantly lower quality of health care than the rest of the population. This was especially brought to light during the COVID-19 pandemic, as Swedish media and public health researchers pointed out that Swedish citizens of other ethnicities than Swedish, and people living in working class areas, were dying from COVID-19 at a significantly higher rate than the rest of the population, due to the fact that they were not provided with the same quality of health care.

=== Switzerland ===
Purchasing basic health insurance is mandatory for all persons residing in Switzerland (within three months of taking up residence or being born in the country). Healthcare in Switzerland is universally available and is regulated by the Federal Health Insurance Act of 1994. Supplemental insurance plans are optional. Insurers are required to offer insurance to everyone, regardless of age or medical condition. They are not allowed to make a profit off this basic insurance, but can on supplemental plans.

=== United Kingdom ===
Each of the countries of the United Kingdom has a National Health Service that provides public healthcare to all UK permanent residents that was originally designed to be free at the point of need and paid for from general taxation; but changes included introducing charging for prescription medicines and dentistry (those below 16 and those on certain benefits may still get free treatment). However, since health is now a devolved matter, considerable differences are developing between the systems in each of the countries for example Northern Ireland, Scotland and Wales abolished prescription charges. Private healthcare companies are free to operate alongside the public system.

==== England ====
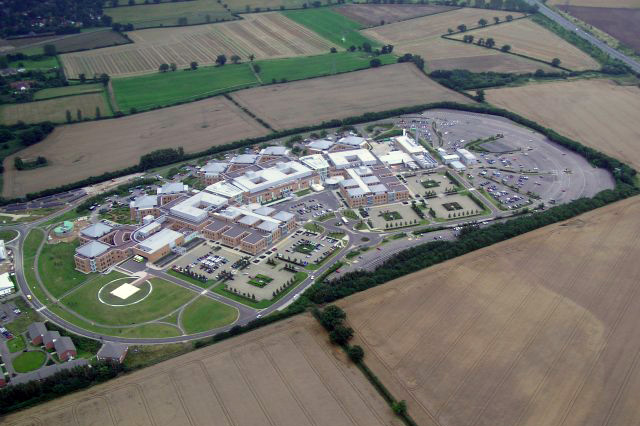
Norfolk and Norwich University Hospital, a National Health Service hospital.

The National Health Service (NHS), created by the National Health Service Act 1946, has provided the majority of healthcare in England since its launch on July 5, 1948.

The NHS Constitution for England documents, at a high level, the objectives of the NHS, the legal rights and responsibilities of the various parties (patients, staff, NHS trust boards), and the guiding principles that govern the service. The NHS constitution makes it clear that it provides a comprehensive service, available to all irrespective of age, gender, disability, race, sexual orientation, religion, or belief; that access to NHS services is based on clinical need and not an individual's ability to pay; and that care is never refused on unreasonable grounds. Patient choice in terms of doctor, care, treatments, and place of treatment is an important aspect of the NHS's ambition, and in some cases patients can elect for treatment in other European countries at the NHS's expense. Waiting times are low, with most people able to see their primary care doctor on the same day or the following day. Only 36.1% of hospital admissions are from a waiting list, with the remainder being either emergencies admitted immediately or else pre-booked admissions or the like (e.g., child birth). One of the main goals of care management is to ensure that patients do not experience a delay of more than 18 weeks from initial hospital referral to final treatment, inclusive of time for all associated investigative tests and consultations. In 2009, two-thirds of patients were treated in under 12 weeks.

Though centrally funded, the NHS is not managed by a large central bureaucracy. Responsibility is divided among geographical areas through strategic health authorities. Management is distributed even more locally through primary care trusts, hospital trusts—and increasingly to NHS foundation trusts that provide even more decentralized services within the NHS framework, with more decisions left to local people, patients, and staff. The central government office—the Department of Health—is not involved in day-to-day decision making in either the Strategic Health Authorities or the individual local trusts (primarily health, hospital, or ambulance) or the national specialist trusts such as NHS Blood and Transplant. It does lay down general guidelines they must follow. Local trusts are accountable to their local populations, whilst government ministers are accountable to Parliament for the service overall.

The NHS provides, among other things, primary care, in-patient care, long-term healthcare, psychiatric care and treatments, ophthalmology, and dentistry. All treatment is taxpayer-funded with the exception of certain charges for prescriptions, dentistry and ophthalmology (which themselves are free to children, certain students in full-time education, the elderly, the unemployed and those on low incomes). Around 89 percent of NHS prescriptions are obtained free of charge, mostly for children, pensioners, and pregnant women. Others pay a flat rate of £9.90, and others may cap their annual charges by purchasing an NHS Prescription Prepayment Certificate. Private health care has continued parallel to the NHS, paid for largely by private insurance. Private insurance accounts for only 4 percent of health expenditure and covers little more than a tenth of the population. Private insurers in the UK only cover acute care from specialists. They do not cover generalist consultations, pre-existing conditions, medical emergencies, organ transplants, chronic conditions such as diabetes, or conditions such as pregnancy or HIV.

Most NHS general practitioners are private doctors who contract to provide NHS services, but most hospitals are publicly owned and run through NHS trusts. A few NHS medical services (such as "surgicentres") are sub-contracted to private providers as are some non-medical services (such as catering). Some capital projects such as new hospitals have been funded through the Private Finance Initiative, enabling investment without (in the short term) increasing the public sector borrowing requirement, because long-term contractually obligated PFI spending commitments are not counted as government liabilities.

==== Northern Ireland ====
Health and Social Care in Northern Ireland is the designation of the national public health service in Northern Ireland.

==== Scotland ====
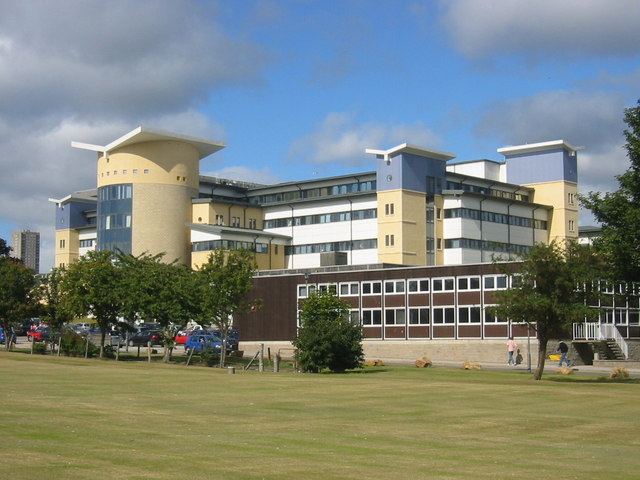
The Royal Aberdeen Children's Hospital is a specialist children's hospital within NHS Scotland.

NHS Scotland, created by the National Health Service (Scotland) Act 1947, was also launched on July 5, 1948, although it has always been a separate organization. Since devolution, NHS Scotland has followed the policies and priorities of the Scottish Government, including the phasing out of all prescription charges by 2011. Prescriptions are now free in Scotland for all citizens.

==== Wales ====
NHS Wales was originally formed as part of the same NHS structure created by the National Health Service Act 1946 but powers over the NHS in Wales came under the Secretary of State for Wales in 1969, in turn being transferred under devolution to what is now the Welsh Government.

==== Crown dependencies ====
===== Isle of Man =====
The Isle of Man, a UK Crown dependency, provides universal public health coverage to its residents.

===== Channel Islands =====
The medical care system in the Channel Islands is very similar to that of the UK in that many of the doctors and nurses have been trained from the UK health perspective.

There is universal health care for residents of Jersey.

Healthcare in Guernsey and Alderney is charged for with all primary care provided for on a private basis.

There is no universal healthcare for residents of Sark.

== North America ==
Barbados, Canada, Costa Rica, Cuba, Mexico, and Trinidad and Tobago all provide some level of universal health coverage.

=== Bahamas ===
The Bahamas approved the National Health Insurance Act in August 2016. The legislation establishes a universal health coverage system that begins with universal coverage of primary health care services, and later expands to include a wide set of benefits that includes all specialized care. The system allows for universal coverage of a basic benefits package and for voluntary insurance to be purchased as a top-up policy to cover services or amenities that are not included in the government plan.

=== Canada ===
In 1984, the Canada Health Act was passed, which prohibited extra billing by doctors on patients while at the same time billing the public insurance system. In 1999, the prime minister and most premiers reaffirmed in the Social Union Framework Agreement that they are committed to health care that has "comprehensiveness, universality, portability, public administration and accessibility."

The system is for the most part publicly funded, yet most of the services are provided by private enterprises or private corporations, although most hospitals are public. Most doctors do not receive an annual salary, but receive a fee per visit or service. About 29% of Canadians' health care is paid for by the private sector or individuals. This mostly goes towards services not covered or only partially covered by Medicare such as prescription drugs, dentistry, physiotherapy and vision care. Many Canadians have private health insurance, often through their employers, that cover these expenses.

The Canada Health Act of 1984 "does not directly bar private delivery or private insurance for publicly insured services", but provides financial disincentives for doing so. "Although there are laws prohibiting or curtailing private health care in some provinces, they can be changed", according to a report in the New England Journal of Medicine. The legality of the ban was considered in a decision of the Supreme Court of Canada, which ruled in Chaoulli v. Quebec that "the prohibition on obtaining private health insurance, while it might be constitutional in circumstances where health care services are reasonable as to both quality and timeliness, is not constitutional where the public system fails to deliver reasonable services." The appellant contended that waiting times in Quebec violated a right to life and security in the Quebec Charter of Human Rights and Freedoms. The Court agreed, but acknowledged the importance and validity of the Canada Health Act, and at least four of the seven judges explicitly recognized the right of governments to enact laws and policies that favour the public over the private system and preserve the integrity of the public system.

=== Costa Rica ===
Universal healthcare and pensions are run by the Caja Costarricense de Seguro Social (CCSS). In 1941, Costa Rica established Caja Costarricense de Seguro Social (CCSS), a social security insurance system for wage-earning workers. In 1961, coverage was expanded to include workers' dependents and from 1961 to 1975, a series of expansions extended coverage for primary care and outpatient and inpatient specialized services to people in rural areas, the low-income population, and certain vulnerable populations. Further expansions during the late 1970s extended insurance coverage to farmers, peasants, and independent contract workers. Additionally, CCSS mandates free health service provision to mothers, children, indigenous people, the elderly, and people living with disabilities, regardless of insurance coverage. By 2000, 82 percent of the population was eligible for CCSS, which has continued to expand in the ensuing period. By covering all population groups through the same system, Costa Rica has avoided social insurance stratification and inequity common in many other countries in the region.

CCSS is funded by a 15 percent payroll tax, as well as payments from retiree pensions [6]. Taxes on luxury goods, alcohol, soda, and imported products also help to cover poor households who do otherwise pay into the system. All CCSS funds are merged into a single pool, which is managed by the central financial administration of CCSS. In 1973, the Ministry of Health decided to move away from direct service provision and adopt a steering role. Responsibility for the provision of most care was transferred to the CCSS, although the Ministry retained responsibility for disease control, food and drug regulation, environmental sanitation, child nutrition, and primary care for the poor. Through the CCSS, health care is now essentially free to nearly all Costa Ricans. Private health care is also widely available and INS offers private health insurance plans to supplement CCSS insurance.

=== Cuba ===
The Cuban government operates a national health system and assumes fiscal and administrative responsibility for the health care of all its citizens. There are no private hospitals or clinics as all health services are government-run. All healthcare in Cuba is free to Cuban residents. The present Minister for Public Health is Roberto Morales Ojeda. The Cuban government sends doctors and other medical personnel overseas as part of medical missions. These missions are mainly in Latin America, Africa, and Oceania and have had substantial positive impacts on the local populations served. Cuba also brings medical students and patients to Cuba for training and treatment respectively.

=== Mexico ===
Public health care became universal healthcare on January 1, 2020, mandated by the new President Andrés Manuel López Obrador and approved by Congress. It is completely free for Mexican citizens who do not have health insurance. Mexico's new universal healthcare, administered by the Instituto de Salud para el Bienestar (Institute of Health for Welfare, INSABI), includes free consultations with family doctors and specialists, free medications, free surgeries, free dental and vision. As of 2020, public health care is provided to all Mexican citizens as guaranteed via Article 4 of the Constitution. Public care is now fully subsidized by the federal government. All Mexican citizens are eligible for subsidized health care regardless of their work status via a system of health care facilities operating under the federal Secretariat of Health (formerly the Secretaria de Salubridad y Asistencia, or SSA) agency. On 2023 the Congress approved the decree to disappear the INSABI.

Employed citizens and their dependents, however, are further eligible to use the health care program administered and operated by the Instituto Mexicano del Seguro Social (IMSS) (English: Mexican Social Security Institute). The IMSS health care program is a tripartite system funded equally by the employee, its private employer, and the federal government. The IMSS does not provide service to employees of the public sector. Employees in the public sector are serviced by the Instituto de Seguridad y Servicios Sociales de los Trabajadores del Estado (ISSSTE) (English: Institute for Social Security and Services for State Workers), which attends to the health and social care needs of government employees. This includes local, state, and federal government employees. The government of the states in Mexico also provide health services independently of those services provided by the federal government programs. In most states, the state government has established free or subsidized healthcare for all their citizens.

In 2006, the Mexican government created the Health Insurance for a New Generation also known as "life insurance for babies". On May 28, 2009, Universal Care Coverage for Pregnant Women was introduced. In a 2020 expansion of health care coverage, all Mexicans are now covered.

=== Trinidad and Tobago ===
A universal health care system is used in Trinidad and Tobago and is the primary form of health care available in the country. It is used by the majority of the population seeking medical assistance, as it is free for all citizens. Responsibility for the provision of healthcare services in Trinidad and Tobago was devolved from the Ministry of Health to Regional Health Authorities under the Regional Health Authorities Act No. 5 in 1994.

=== United States ===
Between 2010 and 2019, the individual shared responsibility provision of the Affordable Care Act required Americans, with certain exemptions, to have private or public health insurance. Otherwise, they were required to pay a fine.

== South America ==
Argentina, Brazil, Chile, and Colombia all provide some level of universal health coverage.

=== Argentina ===
Health care is provided through a combination of employer and labor union-sponsored plans (Obras Sociales), government insurance plans, public hospitals and clinics, and private health insurance plans. It costs almost 10% of GDP and is available to anyone regardless of ideology, beliefs, race, or nationality.

=== Brazil ===
The universal health care system was adopted in Brazil in 1988 after the end of the military dictatorship. However, universal health care was available many years before, in some cities, once the 27th amendment to the 1969 Constitution imposed the duty of applying 6% of their income in healthcare on the municipalities. The Brazilian universal health care is called SUS (Sistema Único de Saúde), which covers all treatments, surgeries and medications for all resident and non-resident individuals within Brazilian jurisdiction, regardless of ethnicity, nationality, or visa - including tourists, passengers in transit and refugees.

The organization of the SUS is markedly decentralized. Each municipality and state is responsible for formulating their own health plan and managing health resources. Despite the decentralization of the health system, the federal government has introduced federal legislation since the early 2000s, which may be considered as an effort to centralize the Brazilian health system.

=== Chile ===
Health care in Chile is provided by the government (via public corporation FONASA, National Healthcare Fund) and by private insurers (via ISAPRE, Previsional Healthcare Institutions). All workers and pensioners are mandated to pay 7% of their income for health care insurance (the poorest pensioners are exempt from this payment but medications are expensive and pensioners have to pay). Workers who choose not to join an Isapre, are automatically covered by Fonasa. Fonasa also covers unemployed people receiving unemployment benefits, uninsured pregnant women, insured worker's dependant family, people with mental or physical disabilities and people who are considered poor or indigent.

Fonasa costs vary depending on income, disability or age. Attention at public health facilities via Fonasa is free for low-income earners, people with mental or physical disabilities and people over the age of 60. Others pay 10% or 20% of the costs, depending on income and the number of dependants. Fonasa beneficiaries may also seek attention in the private sector, for a designated fee.

Additionally, exist the GES Plan (Explicit Guarantees in Healthcare Plan), that consists of a defined number of high-morbility and mortality diseases (currently 85) that have special mandatory attention guarantees for all people, both Isapre and Fonasa affiliates, in relation to:

- Access: Universal access to treatment if required. Individuals will be able to get attention from a provider near their place of residence.
- Opportunity: Opportune waiting times, there is a maximum pre-established time limit to get initial and post-diagnosis attention.
- Financial protection: Law-fixed maximum price with low copayments to providers (maximum copayment of 20% of the cost), the payment cannot be an obstacle to attention. The total cost must not exceed one monthly income for the family in a year.
- Best possible quality of service: Attention only in accredited public or private Health centers, that follow technical requirement standards that will be established based on medical evidence.

The treatment protocols and number of diseases included are evaluated every 3 years by the authorities.

=== Colombia ===
In 1993, a reform transformed the health care system in Colombia, trying to provide a better, sustainable, health care system and to reach every Colombian citizen.

=== Suriname ===
The National Basic Health Insurance Law, introduced in 2014, provides access to a basic package of primary, secondary, and tertiary care services for citizens. It repeals the Healthcare Tariffs Law from 2005.

== Oceania ==
Australia and New Zealand both have universal health care. Hospitalisation is free for permanent residents in both nations. In addition, Australia grants primary care coverage, while in New Zealand general practice and prescriptions are subsidised only.

=== Australia ===
In Australia, Medibank—as it was then known—was introduced, by the Whitlam government on July 1, 1975, through the Health Insurance Act 1973. The Australian Senate rejected the changes multiple times and they were passed only after a joint sitting after the 1974 double dissolution election. However, Medibank was supported by the subsequent Fraser government and became a key feature of Australia's public policy landscape. The exact structure of Medibank/Medicare, in terms of the size of the rebate to doctors and hospitals and the way it has administered, has varied over the years. The original Medibank program proposed a 1.35% levy (with low-income exemptions) but these bills were rejected by the Senate, so Medibank was funded from general taxation. In 1976, the Fraser Government introduced a 2.5% levy and split Medibank in two: a universal scheme called Medibank Public and a government-owned private health insurance company, Medibank Private.

In 1984, Medibank Public was renamed Medicare by the Hawke government, which also changed the funding model, to an income tax surcharge, known as the Medicare Levy, which was set at 1.5%, with exemptions for low-income earners. The Howard government introduced an additional levy of 1%, known as the Medicare Levy Surcharge, for those on high annual incomes ($70,000) who do not have adequate levels of private hospital coverage. This was part of an effort by the Coalition to encourage take-up of private health insurance. According to WHO, government funding covered 67.5% of Australia's health care expenditures in 2004; private sources covered the remaining 32.5% of expenditures.

As of 2019, the Medicare levy is 2% of taxable income, with a Medicare levy surcharge, for those on high income who do not have appropriate private patient hospital cover (1% for singles on $90,000 pa and families on $180,000 pa, rising to 1.5% for higher incomes).

In addition to Medicare, there is a separate Pharmaceutical Benefits Scheme, funded by the federal government, which substantially subsidises a range of prescription medications.

=== New Zealand ===
As with Australia, New Zealand's healthcare system is funded through general taxation according to the Social Security Act 1938. However, aside from hospitalisation, there are user charges for prescriptions, (The charges were introduced in February 1985, and were briefly abolished between mid 2023 and early 2024 before their reinstatement by the Sixth National Government of New Zealand.) and partial subsidisation of general practitioner visits with additional provision for those on low or modest incomes known as Community Service Cards (introduced on February 1, 1992) to target healthcare based on income. These changes were part of broader controversial policies introduced by the Fourth National Government between 1991 and 1993 and effectively ended largely free provision of primary healthcare. According to the WHO, government sources covered 77.4% of New Zealand's health care costs in 2004; private expenditures covered the remaining 22.6%.

Historic attempts to bring general practitioner care into government ownership have been largely unfulfilled.

In 2022 the district health boards system was replaced with Te Whatu Ora, a single crown entity that delivers New Zealand's public health system. It is the country's largest employer. The Ministry of Health remains responsible for setting health policy, strategy and regulation.

== See also ==
- Health Advocate
- Health care reform
- Health Insurance Innovations
- Health insurance
- Health system
- Health systems by country
- List of countries by health insurance coverage
