= Health in North Macedonia =

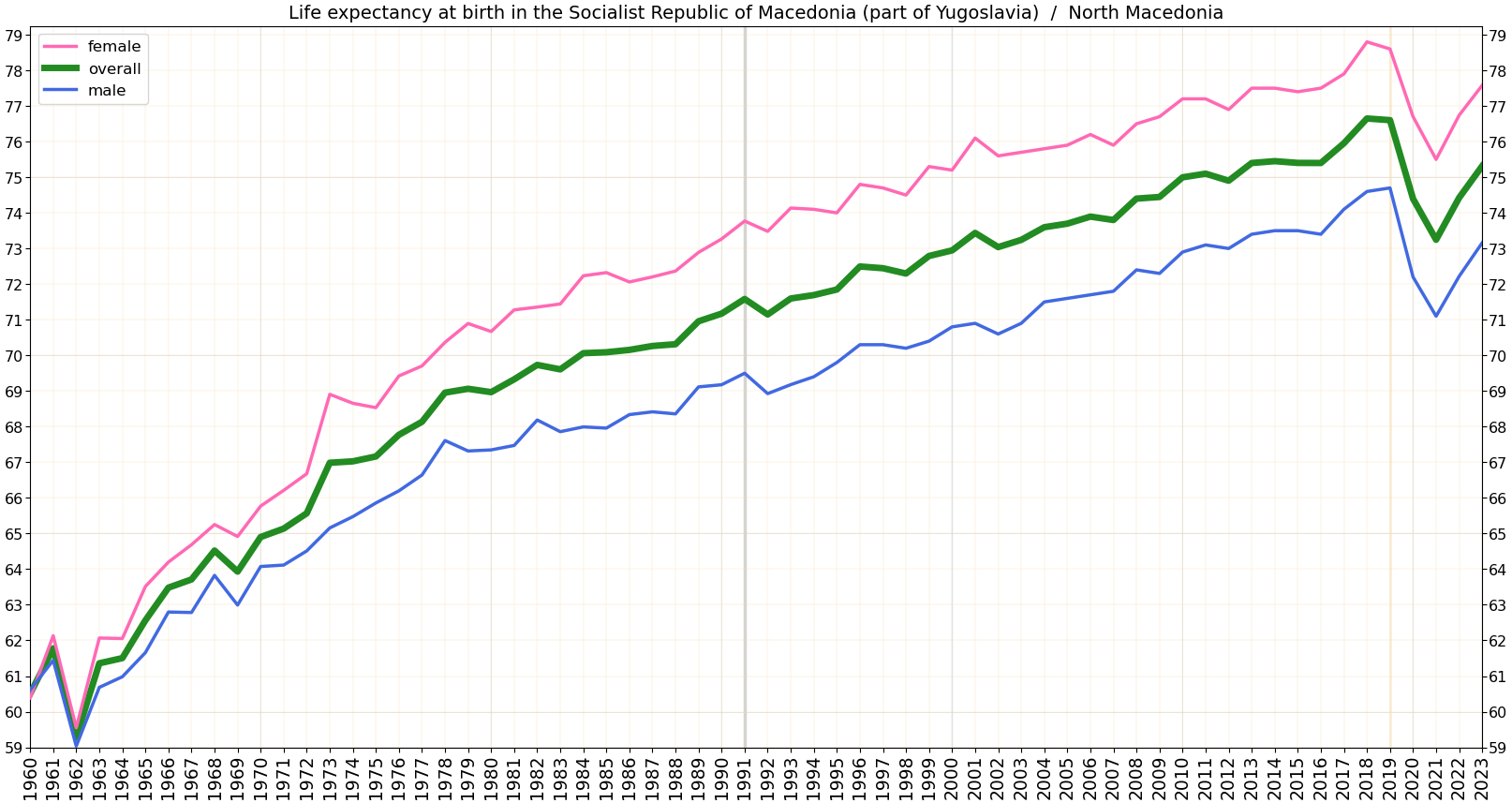
Life expectancy at birth in North Macedonia

Health in North Macedonia is improving. The life expectancy of North Macedonia in 2016 was 74 for men and 78 for women. In 2015 it was estimated that 11.44% of the population of North Macedonia had diabetes, costing about $403 per person per year. In 2015 it had the fourth highest rate of death from non-communicable diseases in Europe (637 per 100,000).

== Healthcare ==
The country inherited a large health infrastructure after independence in 1991 with good well-distributed public health services. Private hospitals were opened and primary care was privatised. Subsequently both public and private providers have been integrated into one social insurance-funded model managed by the Health Insurance Fund of North Macedonia. The public hospital sector is seen as inefficient and is unpopular with both patients and professional staff. 90% of the population are within 30 minutes of a health service.

Expenditure on healthcare was $851 per head in 2014, 6.5% of GDP.

According to the Euro health consumer index, the health system of North Macedonia made the most remarkable advance of any country in the history of their Index, from 27th to 16th place in 2014, because by implementing a real time e-Booking system they reduced waiting lists so significantly. From July 2013, any GP can make a booking at any specialist or heavy diagnostic equipment in the country in real time while the patient is present. They rated North Macedonia 16th in Europe in 2015.

The Doctor's Chamber of the country complains that there is a discrepancy between the available funds and the quality of service expected, that facilities are not used efficiently, equipment is outdated and staff are not used effectively.

=== Hospitals ===
Notable hospitals in North Macedonia include the following:

- Acibadem Sistina Hospital, Skopje
- City General Hospital “8 September”, Skopje
- Clinical Hospital Dr. Trifun Panovski, Bitola
- Filip II Hospital, Skopje, Skopje, established in 2000, cardiovascular surgery center
- General Hospital Ohrid, Ohrid
- Cardiology Center St. Stephen, Ohrid
- Special Hospital for Orthopaedics and Traumatology St. Erasmus, Ohrid
- Institute for Respiratory Diseases in Children-Kozle, Skopje
- Kočani General Hospital, established in 1924
- Military Hospital, Skopje
- Remedika General Hospital, Skopje
- State Clinical Center “Mother Theresa”, Skopje
- University Clinic for Surgical Diseases “Sveti Naum Ohridski”, Skopje
- Zan Mitrev Clinic, Skopje
