= Kahn Sagol Maccabi =

Research and Innovation Center in Israel

The Kahn-Sagol-Maccabi for Research and Innovation
- מכון קאהן-סגול-מכבי למחקר ולחדשנות (Hebrew)
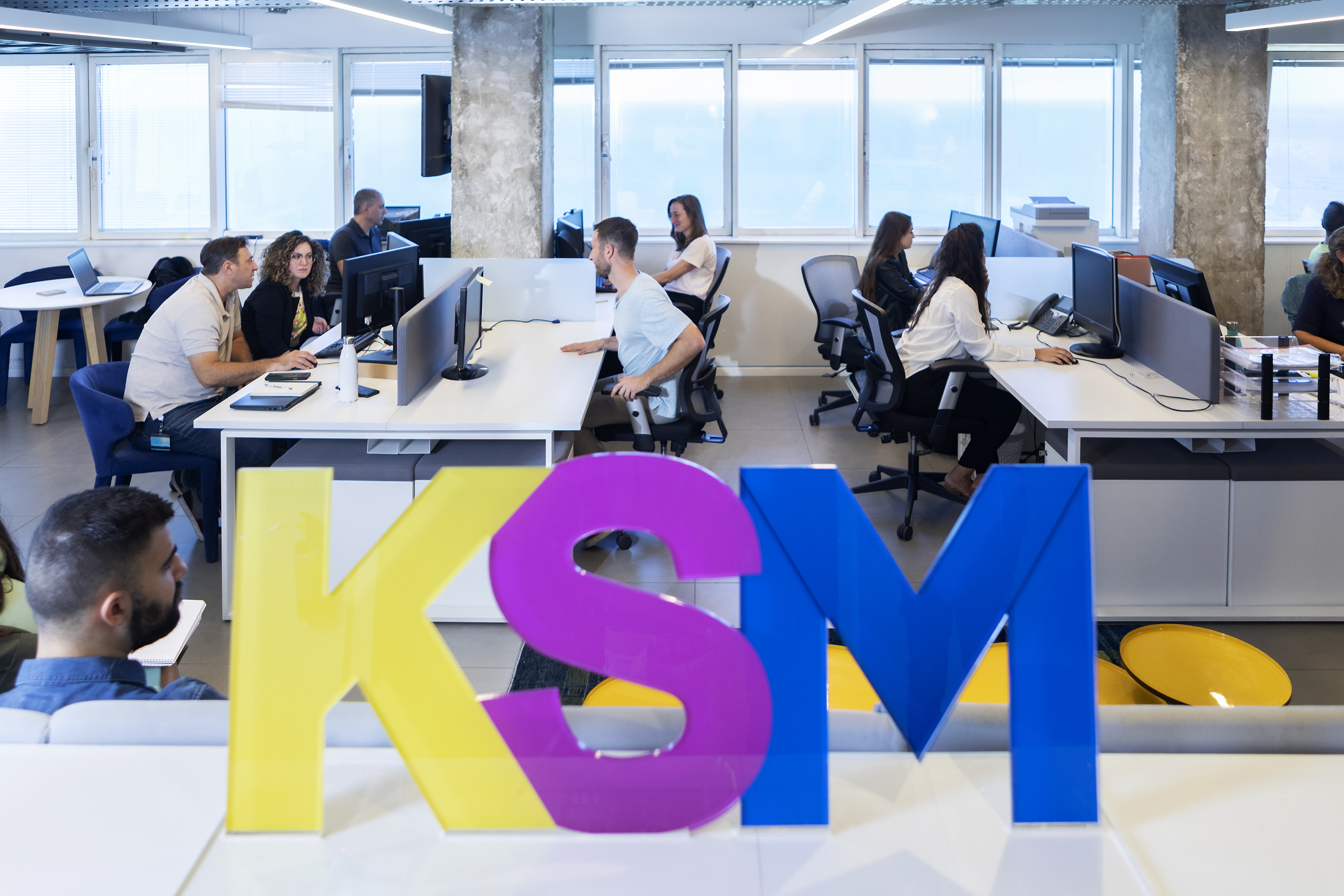
- Type: Medical research
- Established: 2016
- Location: Israel
- Website: www.ksminnovation.com

The Kahn-Sagol-Maccabi (KSM) for Research and Innovation (in Hebrew: מכון קאהן-סגול-מכבי למחקר ולחדשנות) is the Research and Innovation Center of Maccabi Healthcare Services.

== History ==
Founded in 2016 by Maccabi Health Services with the key support of Morris Kahn and Sami Sagaol, KSM promotes excellence in medical research.

It wasa formerly headed by Prof. Varda Shalev and is currently headed by Dr. Tal Patalon.

== Activities and services ==
=== Medical studies ===
KSM Center strives to enhance healthcare systems through independent research and partnerships with international researchers, academic institutions, pharmaceutical companies, start-ups and technology firms.

Since its inception, the center has conducted hundreds of studies, resulting in the development of tools for both patients and healthcare providers. These studies have influenced medical policies in several countries, particularly during the COVID-19 pandemic.

Notable studies conducted under KSM's auspices include:

- Studies on the coronavirus epidemic – During the COVID-19 pandemic, several international scientific studies based on the Maccabi databases were conducted by the center, Including studies on repeated infection in children, repeated infection in adults, natural vaccination, reduction of transmission the decline in the effect of the third vaccine the effect of the vaccine on intra-domestic infection and on patients with Coeliac disease.
- Research on mpox – In 2023, a study on mpox based on KSM's analysis and database was published.
- Research on Parvovirus B19 – In 2023, a study on a local outbreak of parvovirus was published.
- Research on autism – In 2023, a study on late diagnosis of autism was published.
- Research on cancer – In 2023, a study of the effects of palbociclib treatment on the lifespan of patients with breast cancer was published.

=== Medical database ===
KSM's research activities are based on independent efforts, as well as the extensive medical knowledge and database of Maccabi Health Services. This database, compiled over three decades and anonymized, encompasses digital records of 2.7 million insured individuals.

In addition to its in-house research, the Center offers global researchers access to conduct studies, analyses [30] and medical prediction, based on this comprehensive database.

KSM's innovation and big data deKSM's innovation and big data department uses databases and artificial intelligence technologies to support research activities, data analysis, and medical prediction.

=== Biobank ===
The KSM Center has established the Tipa BioBank, Israel's largest biobank housing over a million genetic samples for research purposes.

The purpose of this initiative is to develop tools for early disease detection through genetic and biological studies. A central feature of this effort is the creation of a repository of biological samples (e.g., blood, urine, etc.), enabling researchers to investigate how genetic profiles influence disease risk and treatment.

== Main publications ==
- Gazit, Sivan; Saciuk, Yaki; Perez, Galit; Peretz, Asaf; Ben-Tov, Amir; Stuart, Elizabeth A.; Patalon, Tal (2023). "Hybrid immunity against reinfection with SARS-CoV-2 following a previous SARS-CoV-2 infection and single dose of the BNT162b2 vaccine in children and adolescents: A target trial emulation". The Lancet Microbe. 4 (7): e495–e505. doi:10.1016/S2666-5247(23)00103-9. PMC 10101759. PMID 37062294.
- Shapira, Guy; Patalon, Tal; Gazit, Sivan; Shomron, Noam (2023). "Immunosuppression as a Hub for SARS-CoV-2 Mutational Drift". Viruses. 15 (4): 855. doi:10.3390/v15040855. PMC 10145566. PMID 37112835.
- Patalon, Tal; Saciuk, Yaki; Perez, Galit; Peretz, Asaf; Ben-Tov, Amir; Gazit, Sivan (2023). "Dynamics of Naturally Acquired Immunity Against Severe Acute Respiratory Syndrome Coronavirus 2 in Children and Adolescents". The Journal of Pediatrics. 257. doi:10.1016/j.jpeds.2023.02.016. PMC 9981270. PMID 36870558.
- Gazit, Sivan; Shlezinger, Roei; Perez, Galit; Lotan, Roni; Peretz, Asaf; Ben-Tov, Amir; Herzel, Esma; Alapi, Hillel; Cohen, Dani; Muhsen, Khitam; Chodick, Gabriel; Patalon, Tal (2022). "Severe Acute Respiratory Syndrome Coronavirus 2 (SARS-CoV-2) Naturally Acquired Immunity versus Vaccine-induced Immunity, Reinfections versus Breakthrough Infections: A Retrospective Cohort Study". Clinical Infectious Diseases. 75 (1): e545–e551. doi:10.1093/cid/ciac262. PMC 9047157. PMID 35380632.
- Gazit, Sivan; Shlezinger, Roei; Perez, Galit; Lotan, Roni; Peretz, Asaf; Ben-Tov, Amir; Herzel, Esma; Alapi, Hillel; Cohen, Dani; Muhsen, Khitam; Chodick, Gabriel; Patalon, Tal (2022). "The Incidence of SARS-CoV-2 Reinfection in Persons with Naturally Acquired Immunity with and Without Subsequent Receipt of a Single Dose of BNT162b2 Vaccine". Annals of Internal Medicine. 175 (5): 674–681. doi:10.7326/M21-4130. PMC 8855786. PMID 35157493.
- Ben-Tov, Amir; Lebwohl, Benjamin; Banon, Tamar; Chodick, Gabriel; Kariv, Revital; Assa, Amit; Gazit, Sivan; Patalon, Tal (2023). "BNT162b2 mRNA COVID-19 Vaccine Effectiveness in Patients with Coeliac Disease Autoimmunity: Real-World Data from Mass Vaccination Campaign". Viruses. 15 (9): 1968. doi:10.3390/v15091968. PMC 10534420. PMID 37766374.
- Lechtman, Niva; Shamir, Raanan; Cohen, Shlomi; Chodick, Gabriel; Kariv, Revital; Supino-Rosin, Lia; Weintraub, Yael; Yerushalmy-Feler, Anat; Ben Tov, Amir (2021). "Increased incidence of coeliac disease autoimmunity rate in Israel: A 9-year analysis of population-based data". Alimentary Pharmacology & Therapeutics. 53 (6): 696–703. doi:10.1111/apt.16282. PMID 33547687. S2CID 231946967.
