= Tal Patalon =

Israeli academic and doctor

- טל פטלון
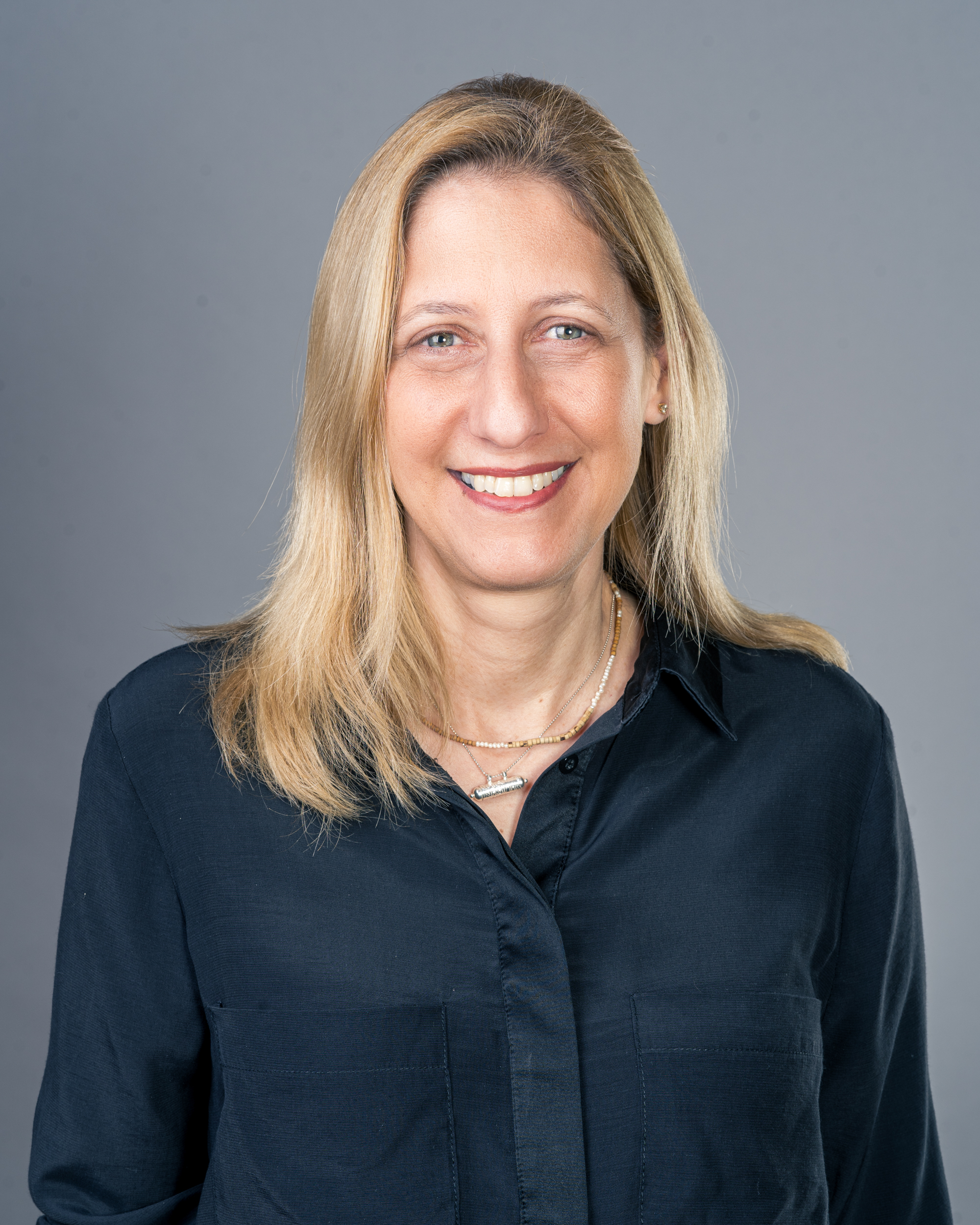
- Tal Patalon
- Born: May 19, 1974 (age 52); Tel Aviv, Israel
- Education: Semmelweis University (MD); Tel Aviv University; Ono Academic College (LL.B.); Reichman University (MBA)
- Known for: Head of Kahn Sagol Maccabi (KSM)

Tal Patalon (Hebrew: טל פטלון; born May 19, 1974) is an Israeli medical doctor and researcher, Research and Development at Maccabi Group, one of Israel largest HMOs. She previously headed the Kahn Sagol Maccabi, the Research and Innovation Center of Maccabi Healthcare Services.

She is the founder and CEO of Medāna, a global health AI company, and the host of the podcast A Matter of Life and Death (Note: A Matter of Life and Death - podcast)

== Early life and education ==
Patalon was born in Tel Aviv, Israel. During her teenage years, she was a social activist. (Note: אסתי אהרונוביץ, ד"ר טל פטלון, ממקימות תרופה לכל: "הרווח שלי הוא לראות אדם קונה את התרופה שלו בחצי מחיר", TheMarker, 21 December 2006) She began her compulsory military service as a teacher-soldier and completed her service as an officer (rank of lieutenant) in 1995.

In 2002 she earned her Doctor of Medicine (M.D) degree from Semmelweis University in Budapest, Hungary. She has specialist degrees in family medicine and emergency medicine, along with certification in palliative medicine, from Tel Aviv University.

In 2007, she earned a LL.B. from Ono Academic College and is licensed to practice law. Patalon has an MBA in Healthcare Innovation from Reichman University, and is certified in legal mediation from Gome Gevim College.

In 2022, she completed a Harvard Medical School certificate program focusing on sequencing technologies and genetic testing.

== Professional career ==
In 2005, she started working as a family doctor at Clalit Health Services, and then served as an emergency medicine doctor at the Wolfson Medical Center. In 2017, she managed the Outpatient Department at the Wolfson Medical Center.

In 2011, she founded Karov, Palliative Care Ltd, a public benefit corporation to promote palliative care initiatives, with emphasis on end-of-life compassionate care. (Note: Karov, Palliative Care Ltd, guidestar)

In 2024, Nature featured Patalon as one of four changemakers who are confronting health challenges through big data analytics and AI. In addition, she was chosen as one of Forbes Israel 2024 PowerWomen.

Patalon is the host of the podcast A Matter of Life and Death, in which she conducts in-depth conversations with doctors, researchers, and others in the field of science, (Note: "זנחנו את הנפש ואת הנשמה", ynet, 27 March 2022) (Note: אנחנו טכנולוגיים יותר ובודדים יותר, ynet, 22 February 2023) technology, economics, finance, artificial intelligence, (Note: "הבינה המלאכותית הולכת להוביל שינוי שכמותו לא ראינו שנים בעולם הרפואה", ynet, 1 August 2023) research, and media.

=== KSM (Kahn-Sagol-Maccabi), The Research and Innovation Center of Maccabi Healthcare Services. ===
From 2020 to 2024,, Patalon served as the Head of Kahn Sagol Maccabi (KSM), Maccabi Healthcare Service's Research and Innovation Center. In this capacity, she manages the Tipa Biobank, Israel's largest-scale biobank for research.

Under her leadership, the center has conducted research integrating AI, innovative epidemiological methodologies, bio-statistical modeling, genetics and clinical studies that have changed health policies and medical treatment.

During the COVID-19 pandemic, Patalon played a role in shaping health policy (Note: "בלי הקורונה אולי לא היו מכניסים לעולם את הזום למערכת הבריאות", Calcalist, 31 May 2021) and fostering international collaboration to combat the crisis. She led KSM's data-driven research that provided new insights into natural immunity, childhood infections, viral load indices, and more, thereby enabling data-driven management of the epidemic.

Under her direction, KSM's research helped shape global health policy, including White House policy. (Note: Joyce Frieden, Fauci: 'Dramatic Data' From Israel Support COVID-19 Boosters, MedPage Today September 2, 2021)

Dr. Patalon has established many partnerships with health industry figures; for example, she has helped forge medical research agreements with the United Arab Emirates (Note: בין ישראל לאמירויות: נחתם הסכם ראשון על מחקר משותף על חוסר בוויטמין D, ynet, 30 June 2022) and Bahrain.

== Maccabi Group ==
Patalon currently serves as the Head of R&D at Maccabi Group.

== Research ==
One of her main research fields is COVID-19, Patalon has also conducted studies on reinfection in children.

In 2023, Patalon co-authored studies on the monkeypox epidemic in Israel.

In 2024, she found that there was a significant increase in the purchase of anti-anxiety medicine in Israel during the Gaza war.
