= Kočani General Hospital =

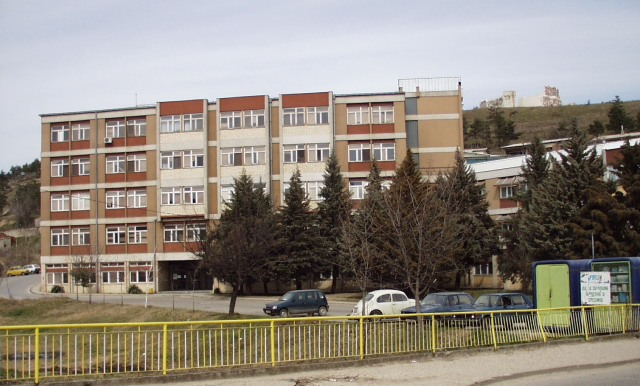

Geography
- Location: Kočani, North Macedonia
- Coordinates: 41.917464°N 22.406608°E

Organisation
- Type: General

History
- Opened: 1924

Links
- Lists: Hospitals in North Macedonia

PHI General Hospital Kochani (Macedonian: Општа болница Кочани, romanized: Opšta bolnica Kočani) is a hospital located in the central area of the town of Kočani, North Macedonia. It offers its continual health services to the population living in the municipalities of: Kočani, Češinovo-Obleševo, Zrnovci and to the population from the municipalities which gravitate towards the Municipality of Kočani like: Vinica, Makedonska Kamenica, Berovo, Pehčevo and Delčevo where about 115.000 - 120.000 people live.

== History ==
The Hospital was founded in 1924 as a Health Centre for malaria. In 1949 General and Dental ambulances were built and in 1952 it was registered under the name Health Centre Kočani. During the 1950s many departments started up their functioning.

Today, the Hospital has at its own disposal 7.796 m^{2} in hospitalization part, i.e. patients’ rooms as well 524 m^{2} in premises for specialist-consultative services. Hospital’s leading team headed by its managers is relatively young but has great professional, expert and managing experience. This creates very favourable ambient for realization of all projected goals and duties.

== Personnel ==
Total number of employees in the Hospital is 226 out of which 43 doctors (4 primariuses, 29 doctors specialists, 5 doctors on specialization and 5 GP doctors). Among other employees there are 5 people with Higher Education Qualification (economist, electro-engineer and biochemist). The hospital has also engaged other medical and technical indispensable staff in order to realize its continual health care services and activities. PHI General Hospital Kočani offers hospitalization and specialist-consultative services.

== Departments ==
Within the frames of its hospitalization part (patients’ rooms) there are 160 patients’ beds being disposed in the following departments:

- Internal diseases department;
- Children’s health preventive department;
- General Surgery department;
- KARIL, Gynaecology and Midwifery with new-born children’s department;
- Neuro-Psychiatric department;
- Hemodialysis department.

== Ambulances ==
Its specialist-consultative services the Hospital has been offered in the following ambulances and departments:

- Ophthalmology ambulance;
- Skin diseases ambulance;
- ORL ambulance;
- Infectious diseases department;
- Department of Transfusiology and providing blood and blood derivates;
- Laboratory and Biochemical activities department;
- Radiology diagnostics department;
- Physical therapy and Rehabilitation department.
