= Varda Shalev =

Israeli medical researcher, professor, and physician

- ורדה שלו
- Born: 1959 (age 66–67); Beersheba. Israel
- Education: Johns Hopkins School of Medicine; Ben Gurion University
- Scientific career
- Fields: Epidemiology, medical informatics and predictive analytics

Varda Shalev (Hebrew: ורדה שלו; born 1959) is an Israeli medical researcher, a professor of medicine at the Tel Aviv University School of Public Health, and a primary care physician. She is also the co-founder and Chief Medical Officer of Alike. In 11.2022 she became a managing partner at Team8 foundry. Shalev sits on the Board of Directors of Teva Pharmaceutical since 2023.

== Biography ==
Shalev was born and raised in Beersheba, Israel. After graduating from Ben-Gurion University of the Negev, School of Medicine, she specialized in family medicine and worked as a rural doctor in Hatzor, a Kibbutz in Southern Israel. From 1998 to 2000, she was a research fellow at the Johns Hopkins University School of Medicine. She also completed a Masters in Public Health Administration from Clark University in the United States.

After completing her fellowship at Johns Hopkins, Shalev founded the Department of Medical Informatics at the Maccabi Health Services Research Institute where she was responsible for developing computerized medical systems. After managing the Division of Primary Medicine, she founded and was the director of the Maccabi Institute for Research and Innovation KSM in 2015. Within the institute she has founded a community biobank called "Tipa" that has used Maccabi's facilities to collect bio samples (Blood urine etc.) from hundreds of thousands of patients creating the largest biobank in Israel.

She also works as a family physician at Maccabi HealthCare Services.

== Big Data Research and Development in Medicine ==
Shalev's research interests mainly include epidemiology, medical informatics and predictive analytics. She has authored over 200 publications in peer-reviewed journals. As part of her research, she spearheaded the development of multiple disease registries to support chronic disease management.

At Maccabi Institute, she developed a computerized system for prediction of the risk of colon cancer in Maccabi patients through an analysis of routine blood test results of patients in Maccabi Health Institute's 2 million strong database. The AI tool was approved for use by the Ministry of Health. Additionally, Shalev and her team also developed techniques through big data analysis which could help to modify antibiotics and custom tailor them according to the individual needs of patients.

In 2019, Scott Duke Kominers and Carin-Isabel Knoop published a Harvard Business School case study about Maccabitech, described as "a "research and innovation wing" of Israel's Maccabi Healthcare Services (MHS) that partners with research institutions, pharmaceutical companies, and startups" headed by Shalev, titled "Maccabitech: The Promise of Israel's Healthcare Data." In early 2020, Shalev co-founded the digital health startup Alike Ltd.

Shalev is a member of the European Health Telematics Association and the American Medical Informatics Association. In 2017, The Marker newspaper added her to their list of the "100 Most Influential People". In 2018, she won the Director General of the Ministry of Health's Excellence in Logistics in Health Systems for developing and implementing a system for the early detection of colon cancer. She teaches at the Tel Aviv University School of Medicine.

== Personal life ==
Shalev is married to Benjamin, an ophthalmologist. Together they have three children.
