= Health Insurance Fund of North Macedonia =

Health Insurance Fund of the Republic of North Macedonia
- Фонд за здравствено осигурување на Република Северна Македонија
- The Fund's logo

Agency overview
- Formed: 17 October 2000
- Jurisdiction: Government of the Republic of North Macedonia
- Headquarters: Skopje, North Macedonia
- Agency executive: Dan Doncev
- Parent agency: Ministry of Health
- Website: fzo.org.mk

The Health Insurance Fund of the Republic of North Macedonia (Macedonian: Фонд за здравствено осигурување на Република Северна Македонија (ФЗОРСМ), Fond za zdravstveno osiguruvanje na Republika Severna Makedonija) is a Macedonian institution which performs as the only state insurance organisation in North Macedonia.

It is largely funded through payroll contributions, with some help from the Pension Fund, the Unemployment Fund and general government revenue.
