= Israeli Health Basket =

Israeli healthcare policy

The Israeli Health Basket (Hebrew: סל הבריאות, Sal HaBriut) is the list of medical services, medications, treatments, and technologies that the Israeli government ensures are available to all citizens and residents as part of its universal healthcare system. The healthcare basket is a fundamental aspect of the National Health Insurance Law, enacted in 1995, which ensures access to essential healthcare services for all citizens and residents of Israel.

The basket is managed and periodically updated by the Ministry of Health with the assistance of a dedicated public committee. This committee evaluates and prioritizes new technologies and treatments to include in the basket, considering both medical efficacy and budgetary constraints. The healthcare basket aims to provide equitable and comprehensive healthcare to the population while balancing costs within a publicly funded system.

The Israeli Healthcare Basket is considered one of the cornerstones of the country's healthcare system, ensuring that the population has access to a broad range of medical services and treatments. It has contributed significantly to Israel's high life expectancy and overall health outcomes, which rank among the best in the world.

Israel's approach to managing and updating its healthcare basket has been lauded internationally as a model for balancing universal coverage with cost containment. The transparent and evidence-based decision-making process of the basket committee is often cited as a best practice in healthcare policy.

== Funding ==
The funding for the healthcare basket comes from multiple sources:

1. Health Insurance Tax: Citizens and residents contribute a mandatory health tax through their income, which is collected by the National Insurance Institute (Bituach Leumi).
2. Government Budget: The Israeli government allocates additional funds to cover healthcare expenses, ensuring that the system remains functional and accessible.
3. Co-payments: Patients may be required to pay nominal co-payments for certain medications or services, though exemptions and discounts are available for low-income individuals, children, and the elderly.

== Components of the Basket ==
The healthcare basket includes:

Medications: A wide range of prescription drugs, including treatments for chronic conditions, cancer therapies, and vaccines.

Medical Procedures: Surgeries, diagnostic tests, and specialist consultations.

Preventive Care: Vaccination programs, maternal and child health services, and screenings for early detection of diseases.

Rehabilitation Services: Physical therapy, occupational therapy, and speech therapy.

Mental Health Services: Counseling, therapy sessions, and psychiatric care.

== The Basket Committee ==
Each year, a public committee convenes to review and update the healthcare basket. This committee consists of medical professionals, economists, ethicists, and representatives of the Ministry of Health. It reviews proposals for new medications and treatments submitted by pharmaceutical companies, hospitals, and patient advocacy groups. The committee's decisions are based on clinical effectiveness, cost-effectiveness, and ethical considerations, with a strong emphasis on providing the greatest benefit to the population within the available budget.
