= Doctor's Chamber of Macedonia =

The Doctor's Chamber of Macedonia was established on 5 June 1992 as a "'successor' of the former doctor’s chamber that existed on these territories in the third decade of the previous century in the Kingdom of Yugoslavia." It is based in Skopje, North Macedonia. The organization initially included dentists, but in 1995 the dentists formed their own organization. A similar organization existed in Yugoslavia in the 1930s. Doctors are required to join in order to practice in the country.

The organization complained in 2018 that there is a discrepancy between the available funds and the quality of service expected and that facilities are not used efficiently, the equipment is outdated, and staff are not being used effectively.
