= Maccabi Healthcare Services =

Israeli health maintenance organization

- מכבי שירותי בריאות
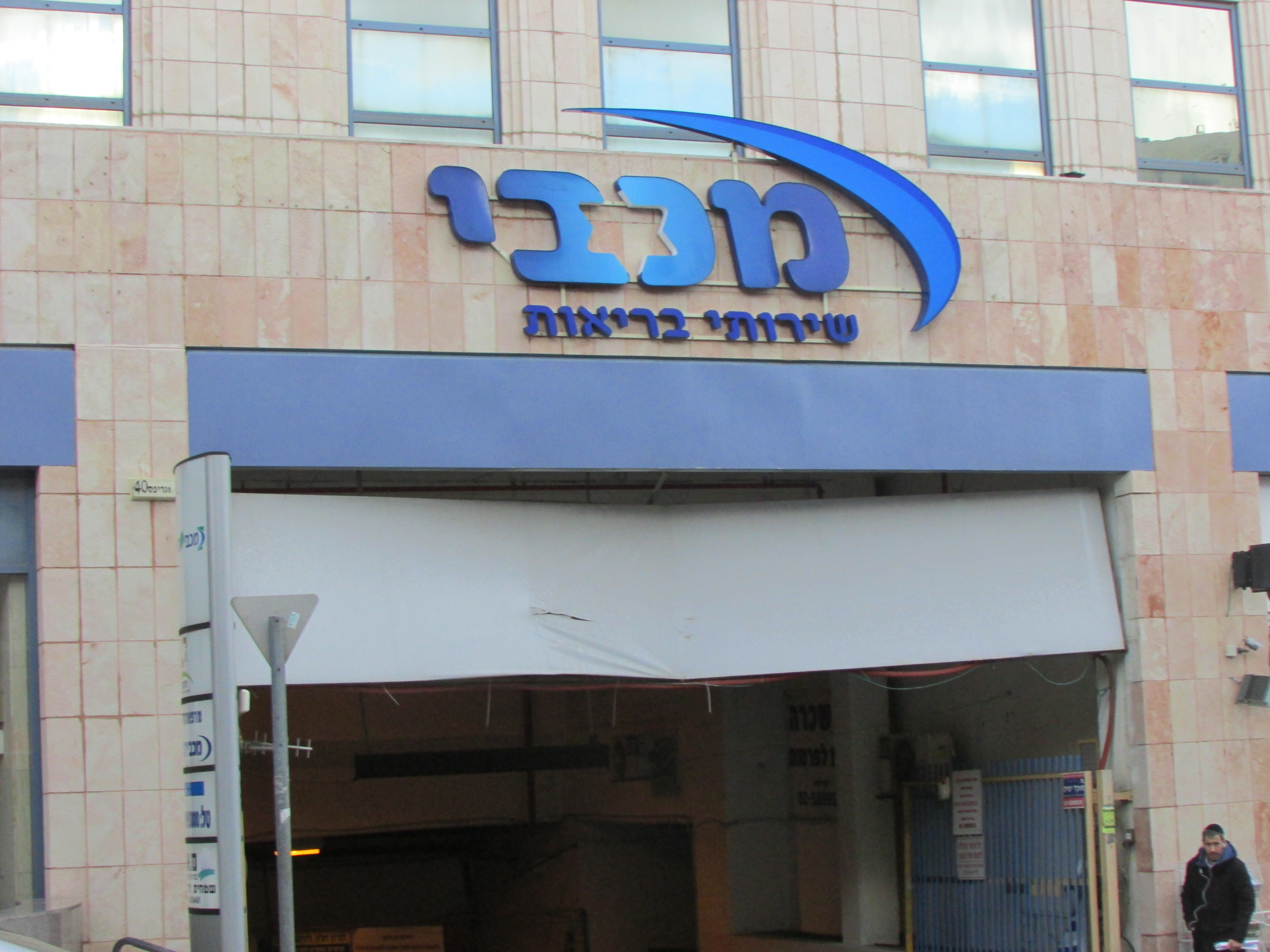
- Founded: 1941; 85 years ago
- Headquarters: Hamered 27, Tel Aviv
- Members: 2.37 million (2020)
- Key people: Ran Saar, Chairman; Sigal Dadon-Levi, Chief executive officer
- Website: Maccabi Healthcare Services

Maccabi Healthcare Services (Hebrew: מכבי שירותי בריאות, formerly Maccabi Fund for the Ill, Hebrew: קופת חולים מכבי), known as Kupat Holim Maccabi, is one of the four Health Maintenance Organizations (HMOs) currently active in Israel. It was founded in September 1940 and began operating in August 1941. As of 2024, it was the second biggens HMO in Israel, with membership of approximately 27.48% of the population. Since 1995 Maccabi has been operating under the National Health Insurance Law.

== Background ==
The National Health Insurance Law sets out a system of public funding for health services by means of a progressive health tax, administered by Bituah Leumi, or the National Insurance Institute, Israel's social security organization, which transfers funding to the Kupot Holim according to a capitation formula based on the number of members in each fund, the age distribution of members, and a number of other indices. The Kupot Holim also receive some direct government funding. The government provides the Kupot Holim relatively wide discretion in determining how to spend their public funding, with the condition that the Kupot Holim must guarantee providing the treatments set forth in the health basket as a minimum service to their members. The Kupot Holim are obligated by the law to offer a minimum package of health services and treatments, known as the Health Basket (סל הבריאות; Sal HaBriut ), to all their members. The law established a system of direct oversight of the Kupot Holim by the state, and certain services are under the direct administration of the State, usually by means of the Ministry of Health. The health funds cannot reject any applicant for any reason, including age or preexisting conditions.

In 1975, the former Assaf health fund was absorbed into Maccabi.

== Medical facilities ==
Maccabi operates 150 clinics, 43 pharmacies, and 20 diagnostic and therapeutic centers in Israel.
